= History of the Pittsburgh Steelers =

Sports team history

Logo of the Steelers, originated from the U.S. Steel "Steelmark" logo

The Pittsburgh Steelers are an American football franchise representing Pittsburgh. They are the seventh-oldest club in the National Football League (NFL), which they joined in 1933. The only surviving NFL teams with a longer history are the Chicago Bears, Arizona Cardinals (then the Chicago Cardinals), Detroit Lions (then the Portsmouth Spartans), Green Bay Packers, New York Giants, and Washington Commanders (then the Boston Redskins). The Philadelphia Eagles joined the league concurrently with the Steelers in 1933.

The team was founded by Arthur J. "Art" Rooney. The Rooney family has held a controlling interest in the club for almost its entire history. Since its founding the team has captured six league championships and competed in more than a thousand games. In 2008 the Steelers became the first NFL team to capture six Super Bowl titles. Currently the club is fourth in total NFL Championships behind the Packers (13), Bears (9), and Giants (8). Eighteen Steelers players, coaches or administrators have been enshrined in the Pro Football Hall of Fame.

== Precursors ==
Art Rooney, founder of the Steelers

Art Rooney, who was born and raised in the Pittsburgh area, was an exceptional all-around athlete. Rooney was recruited to play football for Notre Dame, baseball for the Boston Red Sox; and invited to join the 1920 Olympic boxing team. His love of sports would lead to his becoming an organizer and promoter. This included the Hope-Harvey Football Club, a semi-professional American football team which he founded as a teenager. "In a way, I guess that was the start of the Steelers. It grew from that", Rooney said.

The name "Hope-Harvey" was derived from the Hope Fire House, located in the heart of the Pittsburgh's North Side, which served as the team's locker room, and Dr. Harvey, a local physician, who was a sponsor and unofficial team doctor. The Hope-Harvey Majestics competed against other semi-pro or "sandlot" teams; a collection would be raised from the fans in attendance which would be split amongst the players. In addition to being the team's manager and coach, Art Rooney at times played quarterback for the team, which also included his younger brothers, Dan and Jim. Behind the Rooney boys, these teams met a fair amount of success, including at least two Western Pennsylvania Senior Independent Football Conference titles in the early 1930s.

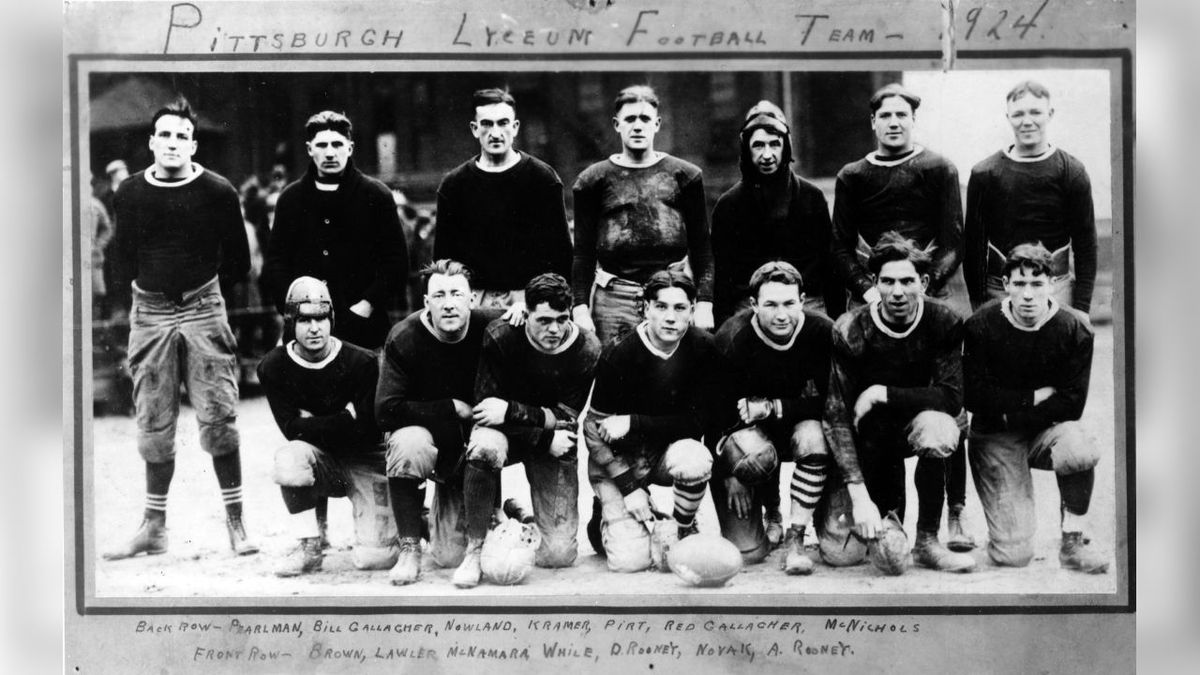
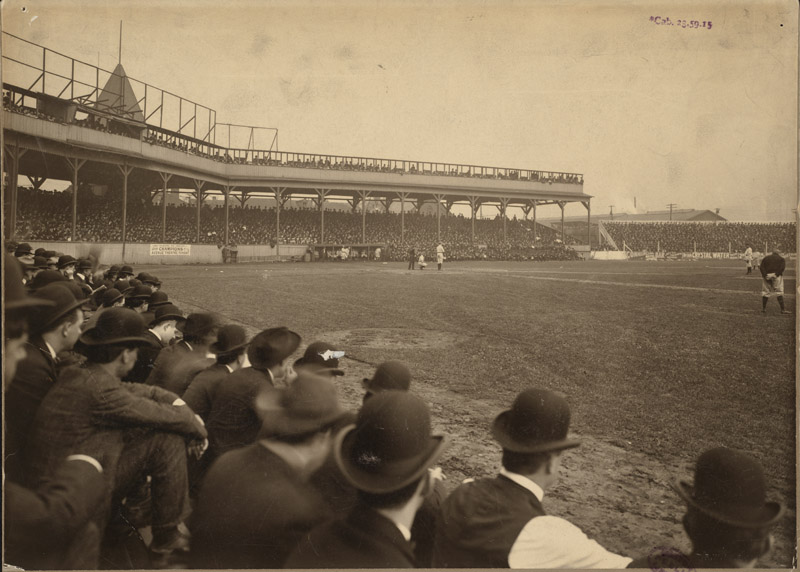
J.P. Rooneys football team played their games at Old Exposition Park

The Hope-Harvey club, which would later come to be known as "Majestic Radio" (when they gained a sponsor) and later the "James P. Rooneys" (to promote the state legislative campaign of the team's quarterback, and Art Rooney's brother, Jimmy Rooney), played most of their home games at Exposition Park in Pittsburgh. These Steeler precursors were composed primarily of players from the local colleges: Pitt, Duquesne and Carnegie Tech, all of which were major college programs of the day.

Although football was popular in Pittsburgh at the time, the city had no fully professional teams due to Pennsylvania's puritanical blue laws, which prohibited athletic competition on Sundays because it was the Sabbath. The teams of the National Football League, which was founded in 1920, played primarily on Sunday to avoid conflicts with college football games which were played on Saturday.

== The early years: Decades of futility ==
In May 1933, in anticipation of the repeal of some of Pennsylvania's restrictive laws in the fall of that year, Rooney applied for a franchise with the NFL. His request was granted on May 19, 1933, and the Pittsburgh Professional Football Club, Inc. joined the NFL in exchange for a US$2,500 franchise fee (roughly $62,000 in today's dollars). The new team was known as the Pirates in reference to their baseball club landlords at Forbes Field. Before settling on Forbes, Rooney considered playing at Greenlee Field, which housed the city's Negro league baseball club. Since the blue laws were not repealed until November's general election, the team was forced to play its first four home games on Wednesday nights.

Rooney's new team was a study in frustration for many years: between 1933 and 1971, they posted a winning record only eight times, with a further six seasons at .500, and made the playoffs just once, in 1947, when they were shut out by Philadelphia.

=== The 1930s: The Pirates years ===
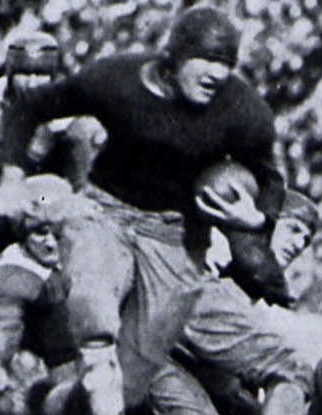
Tony Holm was the first starting quarterback for the Pirates. He only played for Pittsburgh during their inaugural season and also served as the team's punter

In the early years of the franchise, the Pirates were not Rooney's only (or even his primary) focus. Even the office off the lobby of the Fort Pitt Hotel from which he ran the team was shared with the Rooney-McGinley Boxing Club, which promoted fights. He also spent a good amount of his time and energy handicapping and placing bets on horse racing, a lifelong hobby. Rooney once won an estimated $250,000 to $300,000 ($6 to $7.2 million today) in a single 1936 day of betting. It actually was highly likely that the purchase of the Pittsburgh Steelers was made with horse race gambling winnings. However, this is becoming a de-emphasized part of the team's history, with the NFL trying to clear their name of such shady early beginnings.

Rooney's gambling winnings helped keep his struggling franchise afloat during an era when sports teams often collapsed. He recalled, “In those days, nobody got wealthy in sports. You had two thrills—winning on Sunday and making payroll on Monday.” The Great Depression made finances even tighter, with the team losing nearly $10,000 in 1934 ($235,000 today). Competing with established teams in bidding wars was difficult, leading Rooney to propose player signing limits, which eventually led to the creation of the NFL Draft in 1936. The Pirates saw little initial return with the draft system, however, as the team's first draft pick, William Shakespeare, would never play in the NFL. The franchise would trade their first round pick multiple times in their first 30 years.

Pittsburgh's city flag was the inspiration for the Pirates' uniforms.

The Pirates' first uniforms were gold with black stripes and were adorned with the city crest. This color scheme was inspired by Pittsburgh's city flag. The stripes were created with felt overlays, and as such they had functional as well as aesthetic value in that they allowed the ball carrier to hold the ball more securely.

Rooney hired Forrest Douds as player-coach, a three-time All-American from Washington & Jefferson College and an All-Pro in the NFL. The Pittsburgh Pirates' inaugural game was a 23–2 loss to the New York Giants in front of a crowd of about 20,000., with their first points coming from a safety when center John Oehler blocked a punt through the end zone. A week later, they earned their first victory, defeating the Chicago Cardinals 14–13, highlighted by Martin Kottler’s 99-yard interception return and 36-year-old Mose Kelsch’s game-winning extra point. In their sixth game, they tied an NFL record by combining with the Cincinnati Reds for 31 punts in a scoreless draw, a mark matched but never surpassed. The team's five home games drew around 57,000 fans, fewer than the Pitt-Duquesne college matchup that year. Finishing their inaugural season with a 3–6–2 record, Douds was not retained as coach but remained with the team for two more years as a player.

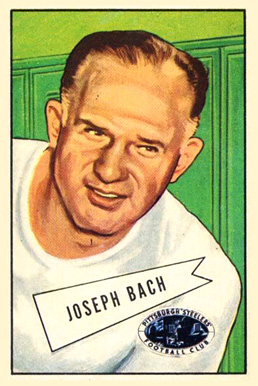
Joe Bach c. 1952

Rooney pursued Hunk Anderson, who had recently stepped down as head coach at Notre Dame, to replace Douds. After being rebuffed by Anderson in favor of a similar position at North Carolina State, Rooney went after Earle "Greasy" Neale. It speaks to the stature of the professional game relative to college football that Neale turned down the Pirates' offer in order to take an assistant coaching position at Yale University. Neale would later coach the Philadelphia Eagles to two NFL championships and earn a spot in the Hall of Fame. Luby DiMeolo, who had been rumored as the leading candidate for the Pirates coaching job prior to the team's first season, was eventually hired to replace Douds. He had been captain of the 1929 Pittsburgh Panthers football team on which Jimmy Rooney also starred. DiMeolo hired Jimmy Rooney as an assistant. Following a disappointing 2–10 season in 1934, DiMeolo was dismissed. Rooney attempted to lure football legend Red Grange, who had just retired as a player, to coach the team the following year. Grange eventually declined the offer in favor of an assistant coaching position with the Chicago Bears. Rooney settled instead on Duquesne coach Joe Bach.

Bach, notable as one of Notre Dame's "seven mules", who blocked for the team's famed "Four Horsemen", saw his team improve from two wins to a 4–8 record in his first season with the Pirates. In his second season in 1936, Bach's team was in contention for the NFL's Eastern Division title with a 6–3 record through nine games, but the season fell apart with losses in the final three games. Both Rooney and Bach blamed each other for the collapse, and although Bach had a verbal agreement to stay for 1937, he left to take the head coach position at Niagara University, for which Rooney released him from his commitment. Rooney later expressed regret for letting Bach leave. The Bach era transitioned to that of Johnny Blood, who took over as player-coach in 1937. McNally, an eleven-year NFL veteran who had played for the Pirates in 1934, was known as one of the game's most colorful characters, and Rooney hired him to help increase ticket sales. However, after a 2–0 start, the team lost its next five games, finishing with a 4–7 record.

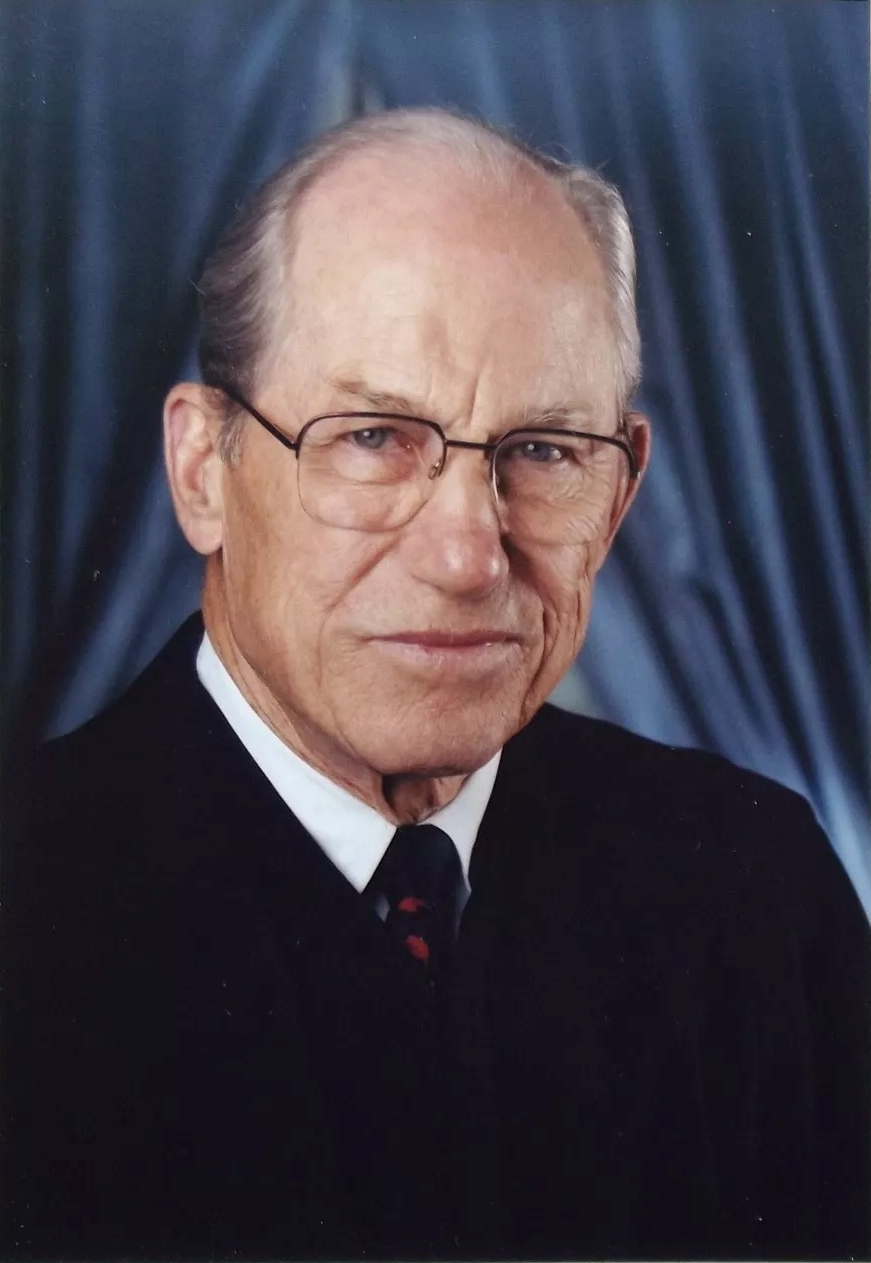
Byron White pictured during his tenure with the United States Supreme Court

In 1938, the Pirates selected All-America quarterback Byron White from the University of Colorado with the fourth overall pick in the NFL draft, offering him a league-high salary of $15,000. White initially declined to continue his education through a Rhodes Scholarship at Oxford University but reconsidered and signed the deal after deferring his start at Oxford. He also received a share of the gate at exhibition games, bringing his total earnings to $15,800. White led the league in rushing with 567 yards but could not help the team improve, as the Pirates finished with a 2–9 record, including a season-ending six-game losing streak. After the season, White sailed to England and never returned to play for the Pirates, later becoming a U.S. Supreme Court Justice. In response to disappointing results, Rooney pursued legendary coach Jock Sutherland, offering him a salary higher than the $13,000 Sutherland earned at the University of Pittsburgh, but Sutherland declined, likely due to his disdain for professional football. As a result, Johnny Blood remained as head coach but retired as a player. The 1939 season began with another losing streak, and after a third consecutive loss, McNally resigned as coach. Despite his lackluster coaching record of 6–19 with the Pirates, McNally was inducted into the Pro Football Hall of Fame in 1963.

McNally was replaced by Walt Kiesling, who had been McNally's assistant coach for the previous two seasons. Their seventh season less than half played, the Pirates had just hired their fifth head coach. Kiesling was unable to salvage the season; the team ended 1939 with a worst yet mark of 1–9–1. The season's lone win came in the season's final game against the Philadelphia Eagles, with whom the Steelers shared the league cellar: the Eagles compiled an identical 1–9–1 record with their season's sole bright spot being an earlier triumph over the Steelers. The victory broke a winless streak that had extended to nearly 14 months.

Through the 1930s, the Pirates never finished higher than second place in their division, or with a record better than .500.

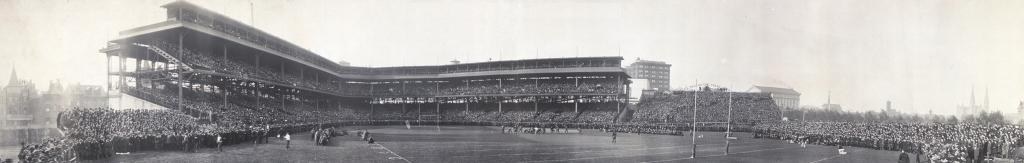
Forbes Field served as the Pirates/Steelers home for most of the franchise's first thirty years.

=== 1940–1941: A new name and a "new" team ===
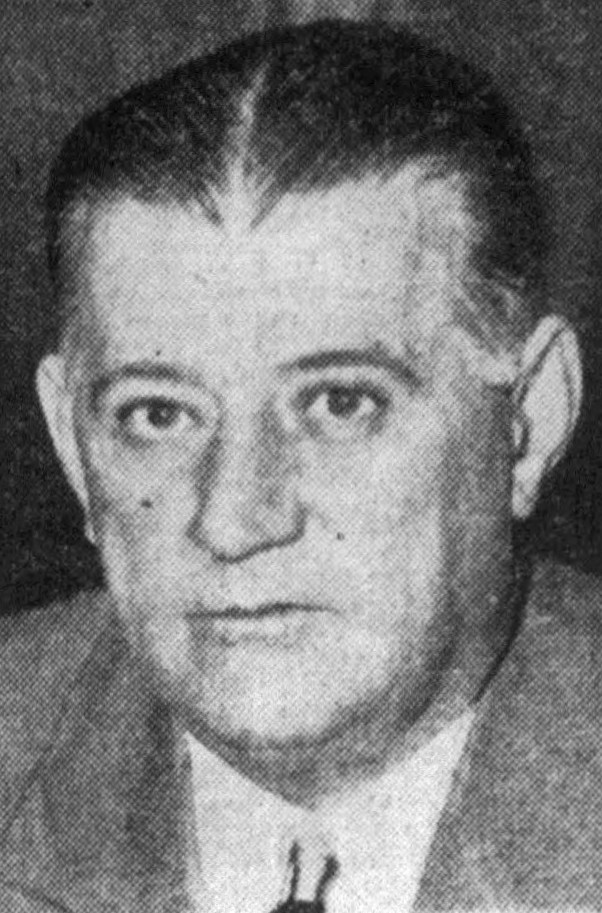
Bert Bell in 1954

In early 1940, Rooney decided to change the Pittsburgh Pirates' name and ran a contest with the Pittsburgh Post-Gazette to find a new one, with Bach leading the panel selecting Steelers from among the entries. The new name honored the city's steel industry. The first person to suggest "Steelers" was Arnold Goldberg, sports editor of the Evening Standard in Uniontown. Other names included Wahoos, Condors, and Millers. The team started the 1940 season 1–0–2 before losing to the Brooklyn Dodgers, who were coached by Jock Sutherland, and began a six-game losing streak, finishing the season 2–7–2. By the end of 1940, Rooney had seen enough of the team's 24–62–5 record and financial losses of $100,000, compounded by concerns over World War II and a military draft. After turning down offers to relocate or sell, he sold the Steelers to 26-year-old Alexis Thompson for $160,000, a deal brokered by Bert Bell. Rooney invested half of the sale in a 50% stake in the Philadelphia Eagles, owned by Bell. A mini-draft was held to distribute players between the two teams, with eleven Steelers players transferred to the Eagles, including George Platukis, Walt Kichefski, and John Klumb, and seven Eagles players, including Joe Carter (end) and Phil Ragazzo, moved to the Steelers. Thompson hired Greasy Neale, previously pursued by Rooney for the Pirates, to coach the team and oversee the 1941 NFL draft.

=== 1941–1944: The war years ===
By early 1941, Rooney regretted selling the team he had founded and saw that Thompson had not yet established a local office for his team, as promised by March 1. Rooney and Bell offered to swap territories, moving Thompson's team to Philadelphia, closer to his New York base, and keeping Rooney's team in Pittsburgh. On April 3, 1941, Thompson accepted, and the Eagles became the Steelers in Pittsburgh, while Thompson's team, the Iron Men, took the Eagles moniker in Philadelphia. This was described as "one of the most unusual swaps in sports history". Despite the name change, the Pittsburgh team operated as the "Philadelphia Eagles Football Club, Inc." for several years. The transaction, which resulted in Bell selling the Eagles and buying a half-interest in the Steelers, was later termed the "Pennsylvania Polka". Because the event took place during the off-season, the Steelers never missed a game, and the NFL considers the Rooney reign unbroken.

Rooney and Bell conducted a coaching search seeking "one of the top men of the profession." Among the men interviewed was Pete Cawthon who had recently left Texas Tech after a successful 12-year stint. Bell and Rooney also considered Aldo "Buff" Donelli, who was the head man for Duquesne University's football team. In the end, Bell, who had coached the Eagles to five straight losing seasons, named himself head coach of the team. This move was made in part because the owners were hesitant to offer a binding contract to a coach due to the specter of the country possibly entering the war. Kiesling, who had led the Steelers the previous season, was retained as Bell's assistant. The Steelers began the 1941 season with two straight losses, after which Rooney tried to convince Bell to step down as coach. Bell agreed to do so only if Rooney could convince Buff Donelli to take over the reins. Donelli, however, already held the head coaching position at Duquesne University, for which he was under contract for another full season. Donelli and Rooney worked out a deal with the Duquesne administrators whereby Donelli retained his position as head coach at Duquesne, with the intent of coaching the Steelers in his "spare moments". He would accomplish this by coaching the pro team in the morning and the college team in the afternoon; he would spend Saturday on the sidelines for the Dukes and Sunday with the Steelers. This was a highly unusual situation, and it did not sit well with new NFL commissioner Elmer Layden (for whom Donelli had played when Layden was the coach at Duquesne). Layden was convinced that it was "impossible, physically and mentally, to direct two major football teams at the same time." Donelli stepped down as coach at Duquesne to assuage Layden. However, he retained the title of athletic director at the school and his schedule changed little, if at all. He continued to attend all of Duquesne's practices and games and continued to be acknowledged as the coach, if not in title. Donelli replaced the single-wing offense the Steelers had employed since their founding with his "wing-T", which was a variation on the T formation. He coached the Steelers to five straight losses, even while his college team flourished.

Donnelli's variation of the T formation continued to be used for several seasons, even after his departure from the team

In early November Donelli faced a dilemma: Duquesne was scheduled to play Saint Mary's College of California on the same weekend the Steelers had a contest in Philadelphia. Layden ordered Donelli to appear on the sidelines in Philly. Donelli chose to stick with the undefeated college squad, and stepped down as head coach of the winless Steelers. The Steelers' coaching position was once more handed over to Kiesling. In Kiesling's second game of this second stint as the Steelers' leader, he led the team to a victory over Jock Sutherland's Brooklyn Dodgers. This would be the only victory in a 1–9–1 season, which matched the team's worst record to date. In a small bright spot, this was the franchise's first campaign in which they were never shut out. Perhaps the most enduring event of the 1941 season was an off-hand remark that Rooney made to a reporter during the team's training camp. Rooney was visiting camp and quipped to a reporter, "They look like the Steelers to me—in green jerseys." This was taken as a reference to the club's poor performance throughout its existence. The remark would morph into the slogan "Same Old Steelers",

==== Steagles ====
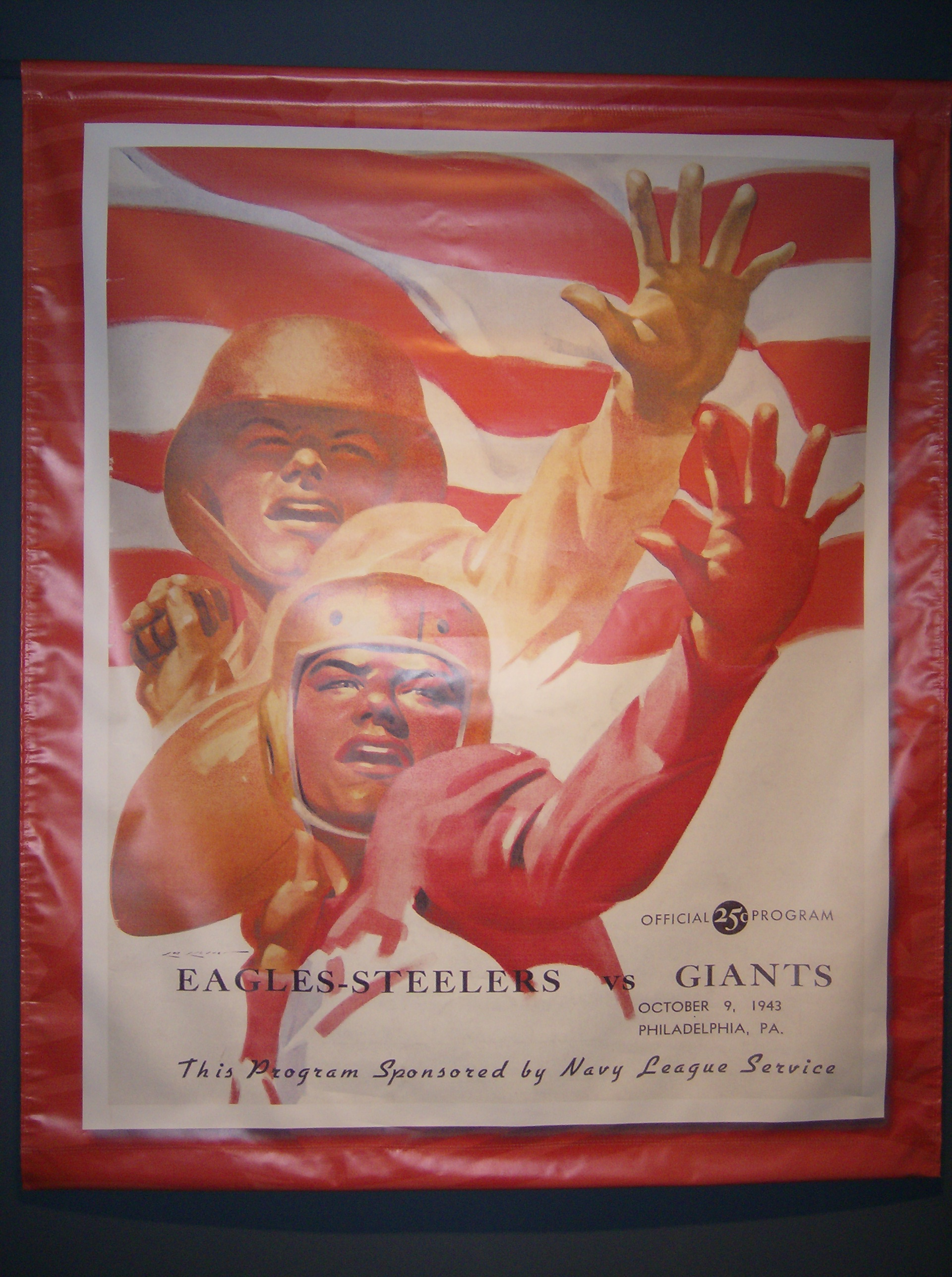
Poster for October 9, 1943's matchup with the New York Giants

At the annual league meeting held on the weekend of the 1942 NFL Championship Game, the league's owners discussed canceling the upcoming 1943 season due to concerns of player availability due to the war. Instead they chose to delay the decision, along with the college draft, until the following April. At the April meeting, roster sizes were reduced from 33 to 25 players, while the Cleveland Rams announced that they would suspend operations for the season: the team's two top executives were serving in the military, as were a large number of players.

The Steelers' roster continued to be decimated throughout the off-season. By late May, they were down to just five players under contract who would be available to play in the upcoming season. Rooney and Bell reached out to Alexis Thompson's Philadelphia Eagles to discuss the possibility of combining the two squads. A proposal to combine was submitted to the league and was slated for discussion at league meetings in mid-June. At the confab the Chicago Bears and Chicago Cardinals sprung a similar request of their own. The league owners voted down the two mergers on the basis that by combining resources the merged clubs would gain an unfair advantage. Rooney and Bell then lobbied the Chicago clubs to withdraw their request, which they eventually agreed to do. After a contentious debate the owners then voted by a narrow 5–4 margin to allow the Steelers and Eagles to merge operations for the upcoming season and retain their players thereafter.

Although the combined team was officially the Eagles and would have no city designation, it became known familiarly as the Phil-Pitt "Steagles". The club split its home dates between the two cities with four games played in Philadelphia and two in Pittsburgh. Walt Kiesling shared coaching duties with Eagles coach Greasy Neale and the club adopted the T formation which had been used very effectively by the Chicago Bears for the past several seasons. Many of the Steagles players were classified 4-F by the Selective Service, meaning they were judged as unfit for military service. Common ailments were ulcers, perforated eardrums and poor eyesight or hearing.

Co-coaches Neale and Kiesling disliked each other immensely. In order to avoid coaching together, they split coaching responsibility along the lines of offense and defense. This accommodation presaged the rise of the modern offensive and defensive coordinator positions that are near universal in the modern game.

The team ended the season with a 5–4–1 record which was the first winning record in the Eagles' history, and just the second the Steelers had enjoyed. They missed the playoffs and were dissolved back into separate franchises immediately upon the season's end.

==== Card-Pitt ====
The Cardinals-Pittsburgh team wordmark

In 1944, they merged with the Chicago Cardinals and were known as "Card-Pitt" and informally known as the "Car-Pitts" or "Carpets". They went winless through the season. The Steelers went solo again for the 1945 season and went 2–8. Dudley was back from the war by the 1946 season and became league MVP. The rest of team did no better as the Steelers stumbled down the stretch and finished 5–5–1.

=== The 1940s and 1950s: "Same old Steelers" ===
The Steelers made the playoffs for the first time in 1947, tying for first place in the division at 8–4 with the Philadelphia Eagles. This forced a tie-breaking playoff game at Forbes Field, which the Steelers lost 21–0. Because of the Steelers and Eagles being placed in different conferences after the 1970 merger between the NFL and the AFL, the game marks the only time that the two major Pennsylvania cities have played each other in the NFL playoffs. Quarterback Johnny Clement actually finished second in the league in rushing yardage with 670.

That would be Pittsburgh's last playoff game for 25 years, and their only such appearance in the pre-merger era. In the 1948 off season, coach Jock Sutherland died. The team struggled through the season (one quarterback, Ray Evans, threw 17 interceptions to only five touchdowns) and finished 4–8. The team once again faded down the stretch in 1949 after a strong start, ending with a 6–5–1 record. That was followed up in 1950 with a 6–6 season, and consecutive losing seasons in 1951 (4–7–1) and 1952 (5–7).

After a 6–6 season in 1953 and 5–7 season in 1954, the Steelers drafted Pittsburgh native Johnny Unitas in 1955. Cut by the Steelers in training camp, Unitas later resurfaced as a Super Bowl hero – with the Baltimore Colts. Pittsburgh suffered through yet two more losing seasons before a 6–6 campaign in 1957 in the first season for coach Buddy Parker. 1957 saw one other highlight, the hiring of the NFL's first African American coach, Lowell Perry as the Steelers receivers coach.

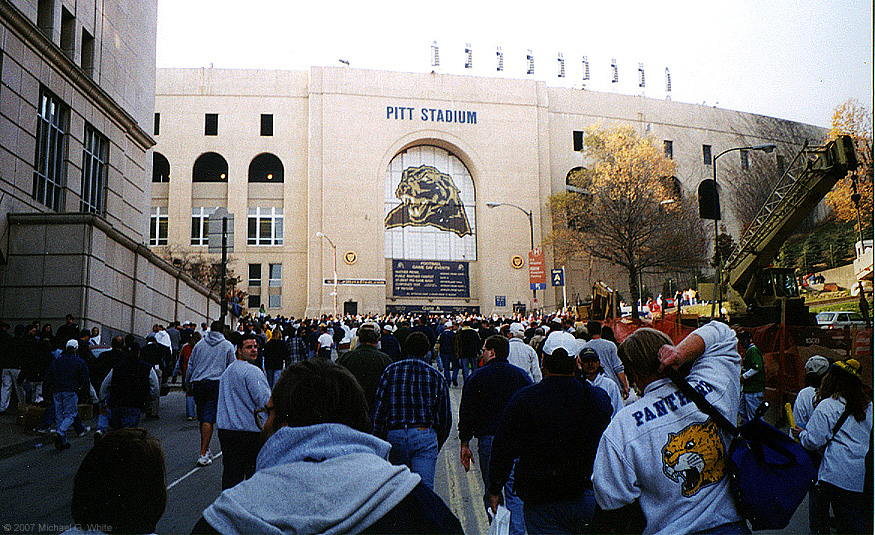
The Steelers played at Pitt Stadium from 1958 through 1969.

Early in the 1958 season the Steelers traded for quarterback Bobby Layne, who led the Detroit Lions to two NFL championships. The results were immediate, with the Steelers posting a winning record (7–4–1) for the first time in nine years – though they were still two games out of a playoff spot. 1958 also saw the first Steelers home games at Pitt Stadium, although their primary venue continued to be Forbes Field.

The Steelers finished above .500 again with a 6–5–1 record in 1959. After a 5–6–1 season in 1960, Rudy Bukich took over the starting QB job during the 1961 season, but fared no better. Pittsburgh finished 6–8.

=== The 1960s ===
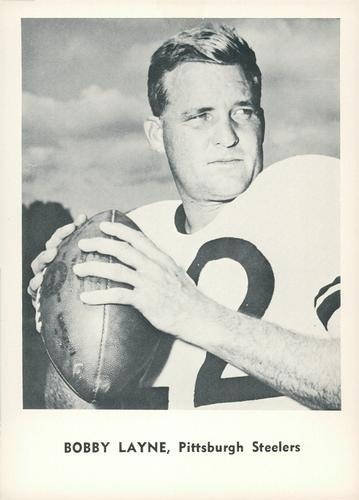
Bobby Lane (c. 1961)

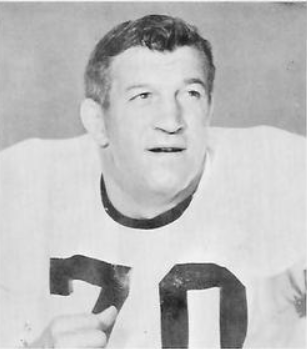
Ernie Stautner (c. 1963)

The Steelers introduced the famous "astroid" logo, based on that of the Steelmark used by the American Iron and Steel Institute (AISI), in time for the 1962 season. Bobby Layne returned to the full-time starting quarterback position, and running back John Henry Johnson had the best season of his career with 1,141 yards (second in the NFL). Pittsburgh shored up on defense too, picking up Clendon Thomas from the Los Angeles Rams; he led the team with seven interceptions. Ernie Stautner anchored the defensive line. The Steelers had their best season yet, finishing 9–5. This was good for second place in the division, and a spot in the Playoff Bowl, which matched up the No. 2 teams in the NFL's two divisions. The Steelers lost that game, 17–10, to the Detroit Lions.

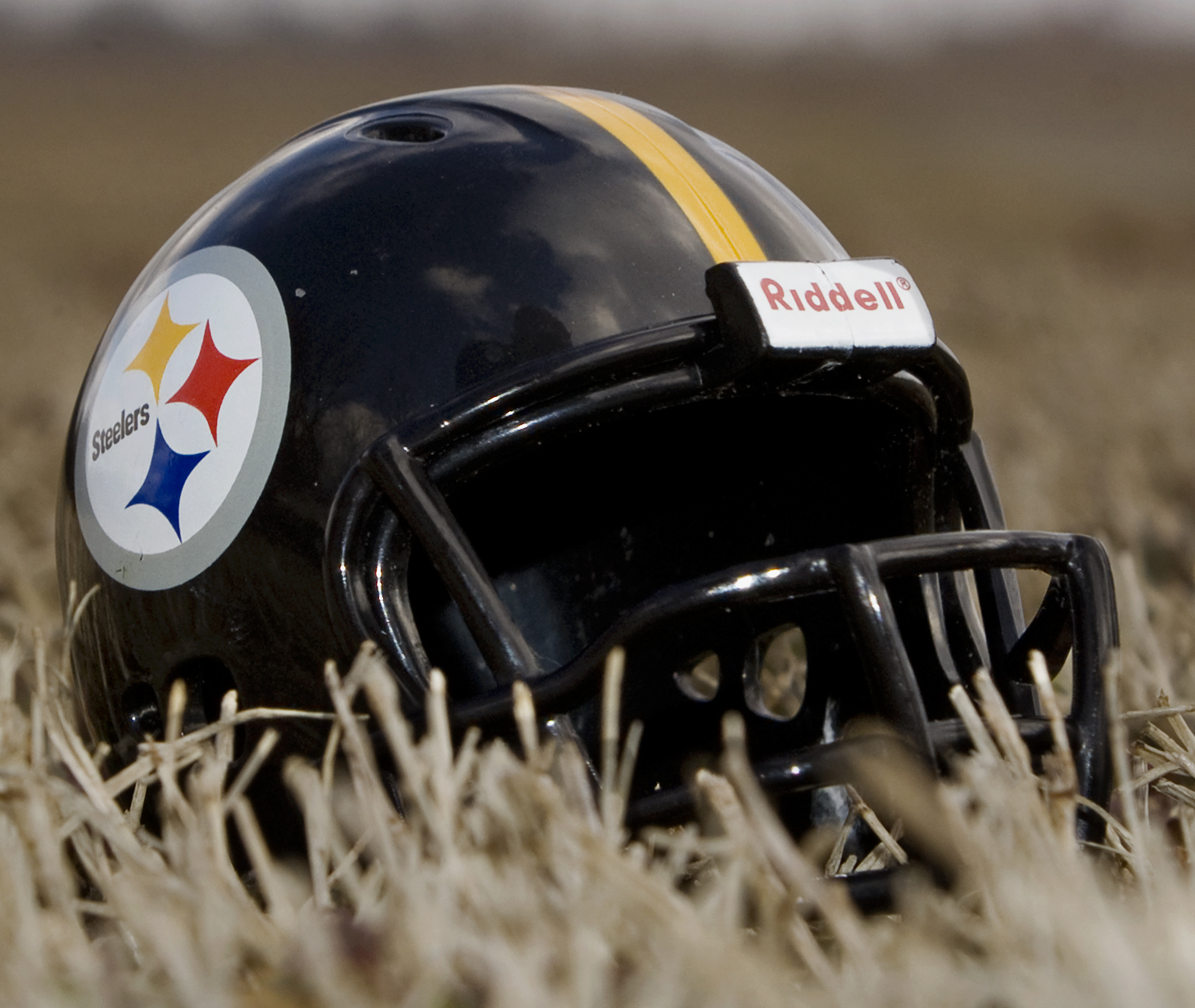
The Steelers logo incorporates the hypocycloid logo of the US Steel industry.

Ed Brown became quarterback in time for the 1963 season after Layne retired. Pittsburgh finished 7–4–3, but in a hotly contested Eastern Division, that only allowed the Steelers a 4th-place showing. Ernie Stautner retired after the season. 1963 also resulted in a change of venue for the Steelers, who split their home schedule between Forbes Field and Pitt Stadium, moving exclusively to Pitt in 1964.

The next few years were total disasters for the Steelers. Another 1,000-yard season for John Henry Johnson was the only bright spot in a lackluster 1964 season that ended in a 5–9 record. Another retirement stung the team, this one of coach Buddy Parker. The wheels totally fell off in 1965, when the team finished at a league-worst 2–12. Over the next four years, the Steelers never finished higher than 5–8–1 (1966), with the team using eight quarterbacks between 1965 and 1969.

Indicative of the Steelers' struggles is the fact that Western Pennsylvania has long been an area producing fine quarterbacks, but the Steelers had never managed to keep them. Unitas was a native of Pittsburgh, making his later success even more jarring to Steeler fans. George Blanda came from the Pittsburgh area, but the Steelers never signed him. The nearby town of Beaver Falls produced Babe Parilli and later Joe Namath, who became stars in the American Football League. The Steelers never signed the Beaver Falls natives, either. They did sign another future Hall-of-Famer, Ohio native Len Dawson, but would let him go as well, before he began a great career with the Kansas City Chiefs. Jack Kemp, a Los Angeles native, was also on the Steelers' roster before being cut. Like Blanda, Parilli, Namath, and Dawson, he became a star in the AFL in the 1960s, as the Steelers went downhill until finally drafting and signing Louisiana native Terry Bradshaw in 1970. By the time Western Pennsylvania had also produced future Hall-of-Famers Joe Montana, Dan Marino and Jim Kelly, Bradshaw and his teammates had long since turned the Steelers from a laughingstock into one of the NFL's most successful and beloved franchises.

== The 1970s: The Steel Curtain dynasty ==
=== 1970–1971: Initial struggles ===
The Steelers' luck began to take a turn for the better with the hiring of coach Chuck Noll in early 1969, though he too won only a single game in his inaugural season (their worst since 1941), defeating the Detroit Lions in the season opener before losing the next 13 games. Joe Paterno had turned down the job before it was offered to Noll.

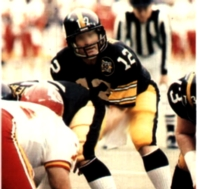
Terry Bradshaw won four Super Bowls for the Steelers, repeating as champions twice.

The team's luck also continued when they won a coin toss with the Chicago Bears after the 1969 season (both teams went 1–13 in the 1969 season, with the Bears' lone win coming at the Steelers' expense) to gain the rights to draft Louisiana Tech superstar Terry Bradshaw with the first selection in the 1970 NFL draft. As poor as the 1969 season was, it turned out to be a springboard for one of the most successful decades any NFL team has ever had.

Noll had further talents, namely in his choice of draft selections, taking "Mean" Joe Greene in 1969, Terry Bradshaw and Mel Blount in 1970, Jack Ham in 1971, Franco Harris in 1972, and Mike Webster, Lynn Swann, John Stallworth, and Jack Lambert in 1974. According to the NFL Network 1974 is the best draft class in the history of the NFL with Webster, Swann, Stallworth, & Lambert all in the Hall of Fame, and all four won four Super Bowl Championships. This group of players formed the base of one of the greatest teams in NFL history.

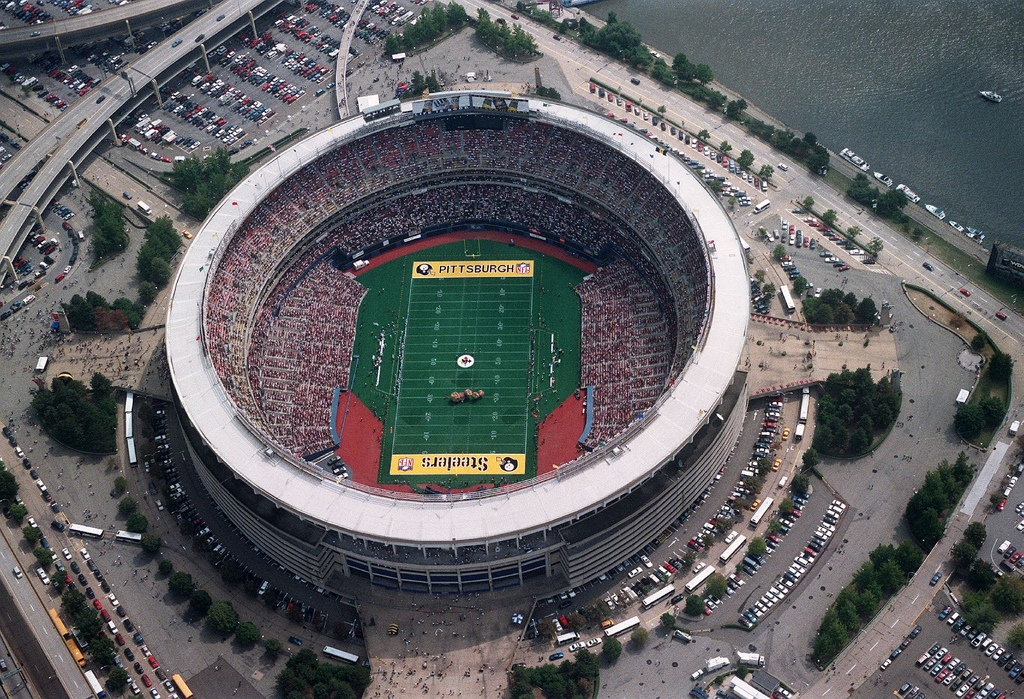
Three Rivers Stadium became the Steelers' home in 1970.

1970 was a turning point year for the Steelers. The team, along with the Cleveland Browns (with whom the intense "Turnpike Rivalry" developed) and the Baltimore Colts, joined the former American Football League (AFL) teams in the new American Football Conference (AFC), following the AFL–NFL merger that year. The team also received a $3 million relocation fee, which was a windfall for them; for years they rarely had enough to build a true contending team. The Steelers moved into Three Rivers Stadium, and Terry Bradshaw, picked first overall in the draft, started at quarterback. Myron Cope, thought by many as a Pittsburgh institution, entered the broadcast booth for a 35-year career as a Steelers radio commentator. The initial results, though an improvement over the late 1960s, were still unimpressive. Pittsburgh lost its season opener against the Oilers and Terry Bradshaw struggled for much of the season, being sacked for a safety in each of his first three games and throwing 24 interceptions on the way to a 5–9 record. The local media subjected him to harsh criticism for a long time. In 1971, Bradshaw threw 22 interceptions during a 6–8 season.

=== 1972–1975: The Immaculate Reception and back-to-back championships ===
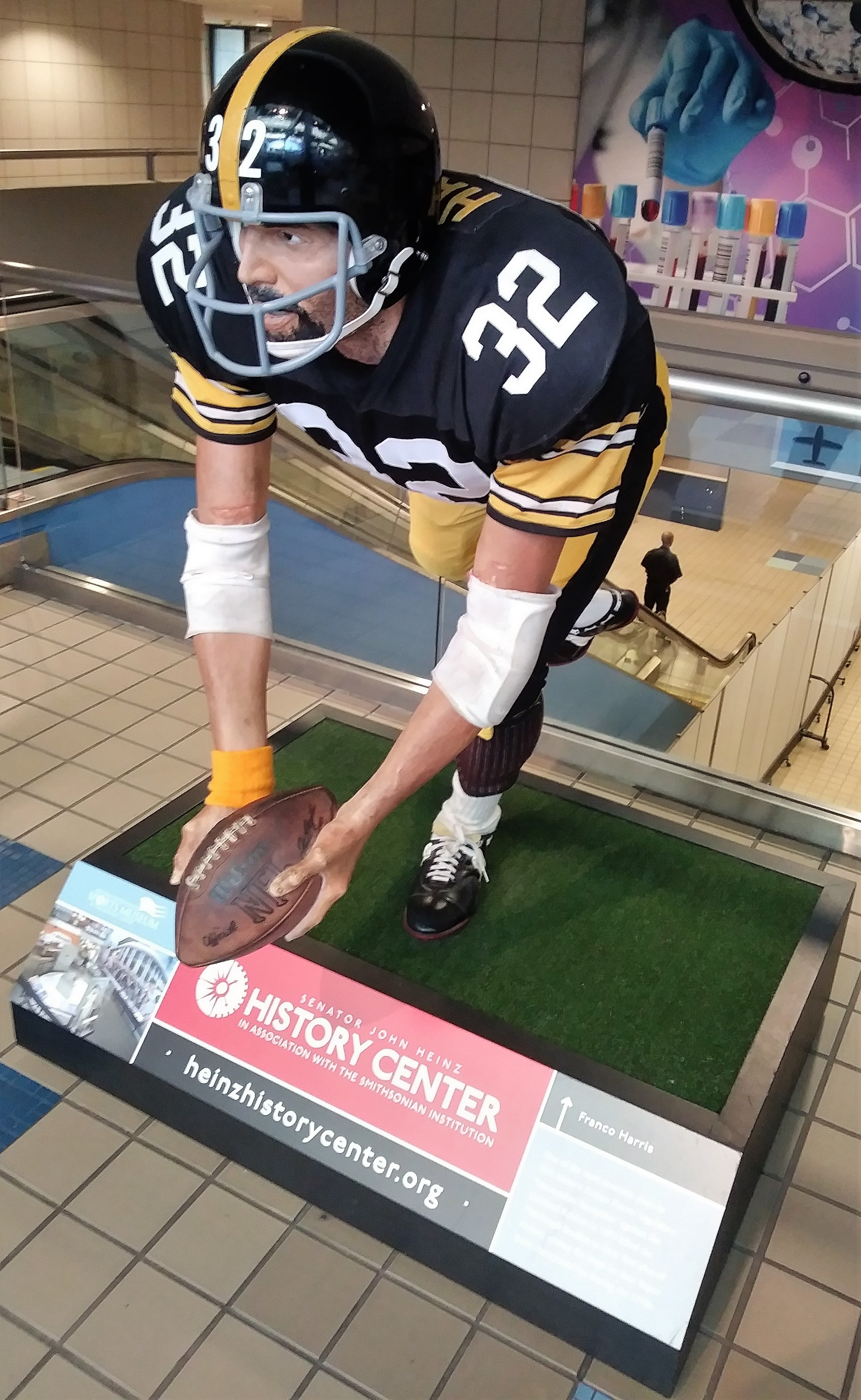
Statue of Franco Harris commemorating the "Immaculate Reception" seen at Pittsburgh International Airport

1972, however, was the breakthrough year, and the beginning of an NFL dynasty. Rookie Franco Harris joined the team and ran for 1,055 yards and scored 11 touchdowns. Pittsburgh finished 11–3, first place in the AFC Central, and made the playoffs for the first time since 1947.

Their first playoff game, against the Oakland Raiders, at Three Rivers Stadium, featured one of the best-known plays in league history: the Immaculate Reception. On 4th down from the Pittsburgh 40-yard line with 22 seconds left and trailing 7–6, Bradshaw threw a pass intended for John "Frenchy" Fuqua. Raiders defensive back Jack Tatum knocked it away, but it was scooped up at ankle-height before hitting the turf by Franco Harris, who took it into the end zone for the winning touchdown and a 13–7 victory. In the AFC Championship the following week, the Steelers lost 21–17 to the "perfect" Miami Dolphins, who finished the season 17–0.

After an 8–1 start in 1973, a losing streak late in the season cost the Steelers several home games during the playoffs, and they lost a tiebreaker to the Cincinnati Bengals for first place in the division at 10–4. The Steelers traveled to Oakland for the first round of the playoffs and lost 33–14.

The Steelers selected the nucleus of the "Steel Curtain" defense in the 1974 draft. This allowed the team to reach the top for the first time. Terry Bradshaw was benched for poor performance early in the season and replaced as starter by Joe Gilliam, but eventually was reinstated after Gilliam did no better. The Steelers finished 10–3–1 and walked away with the division title, with "Mean" Joe Greene winning Defensive Player of the Year honors.

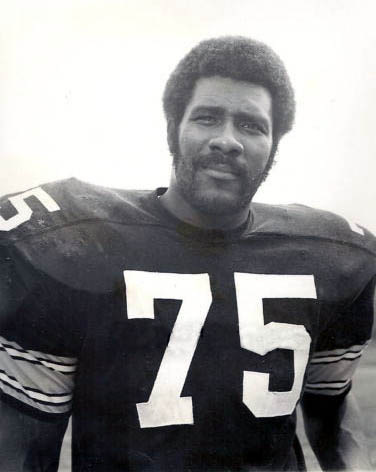
Mean Joe Greene in 1975

After defeating Buffalo Bills and Oakland Raiders with relative ease in the AFC playoffs, the Steelers met the Minnesota Vikings in New Orleans for Super Bowl IX. The game was a defensive struggle: the only scoring in the first half was a safety scored by the Steelers when Minnesota quarterback Fran Tarkenton was sacked in the end zone. In the second half, the Steelers scored a touchdown after a fumbled kickoff and clinched it with a late Larry Brown touchdown. The Steelers won 16–6, and had finally earned a championship after 42 years of futility.

The team had an even better 1975 season. Pittsburgh ran off an 11-game winning streak and gave up more than 20 points in only two games. Mel Blount was named AFC Defensive Player of the Year, Franco Harris had 1,246 rushing yards (second behind O. J. Simpson), and Lynn Swann caught 11 touchdown passes. Terry Bradshaw delivered a much better performance than in his previous seasons, with 2,055 passing yards, 18 TDs, and only nine interceptions. The Steelers finished 12–2, best in the AFC. In the playoffs, Pittsburgh defeated the Baltimore Colts 28–10 in the first round, and survived a late scare from the Oakland Raiders (and a concussion by Swann) to win 16–10 in the AFC Championship.

The Steelers made their second straight Super Bowl, this one against the Dallas Cowboys in Miami. Down 10–7 in the fourth quarter, Roy Gerela kicked two field goals and Bradshaw threw a 64-yard touchdown pass to Swann to put Pittsburgh in the lead for good. After the Cowboys came back with a touchdown of their own, Roger Staubach threw a last-second interception that sealed a 21–17 win for the Steelers. Lynn Swann had returned from his injuries and racked up four receptions for 161 yards and a TD in the Super Bowl, earning him the title of game MVP.

=== 1976–1977: Playoff losses ===
The two-time defending champions got off to a rough start in 1976, losing four of their first five games. The team regrouped and, based on their powerful defense, won their last nine regular season games, five of which were shutouts. For the third consecutive year, a Steelers player (this time Jack Lambert) won the AFC Defensive Player of the Year award. Pittsburgh finished 10–4 and blew out the Colts 40–14 in the divisional playoffs. In the AFC Championship, an injury-plagued Steeler team lost 24–7 to their perennial playoff nemeses and eventual Super Bowl champions, the Raiders.

Pittsburgh's 1977 season was a relative disappointment. Bradshaw threw more interceptions than touchdowns, halfback Rocky Bleier had only half as productive a season as he did in 1976, and the famed Steel Curtain defense gave up nearly twice as many points. The team still won the division at 9–5, but lost 34–21 to the Denver Broncos in the divisional playoff.

=== 1978–1979: Third and fourth Super Bowls ===
The Steelers kicked off 1978 with controversy, when during a post-draft mini camp they were caught wearing shoulder pads in violation of league rules. They would lose a draft pick the following year for the infraction. Pittsburgh posted a 14–2 regular season record, best in the NFL. In the playoffs, the Steelers blew away the Denver Broncos and Houston Oilers by a combined score of 67–15 en route to Super Bowl XIII.

That game, a rematch with the Cowboys, is considered by many to be one of the greatest Super Bowls of all time. Bradshaw threw four touchdowns, but the Cowboys never were out of it, thanks in part to a fumble recovery for a touchdown by Mike Hegman. After Swann and Harris scored touchdowns 19 seconds apart in the fourth quarter, the Cowboys countered with scores of their own by Billy Joe Dupree and Butch Johnson to pull within four points with 22 seconds left. The Steelers recovered the onside kick and pulled off a 35–31 win. Terry Bradshaw was named game MVP.

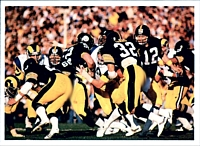
The Steelers became the first team to win four Super Bowls after defeating the Rams in Super Bowl XIV.

The 1979 season was the last season of the dynasty. Bradshaw threw for over 3,700 yards and 26 touchdowns and John Stallworth had 1183 yards receiving. The Steelers finished 12–4, once again tops in the AFC Central. In the playoffs they defeated the Dolphins 34–14 and the Oilers 27–13, to meet the Los Angeles Rams in their fourth Super Bowl.

The Rams had a number of ex-Steelers staff members, and thus knew all of their opponent's plays, audibles. and hand signs. With this knowledge, they played the Steelers hard for three quarters. Bradshaw threw three interceptions, but also had two long touchdown passes in the second half (one to Swann and one to Stallworth). The Rams could not recover and Pittsburgh won 31–19.

The team's success in this era led to the expansion of its fanbase beyond its geographic region. Today, Pittsburgh remains among the league leaders in merchandise sales, and draws fans from across the country to its games. This loyal fan following is sometimes called Steeler Nation (predating the similarly popular 1970s powerhouse, the Oakland Raiders Raider Nation) [Birth of a Nation: Capturing The Identity of a Region. byline, John Mehno], the term was coined by NFL Films as the producers studied the phenomenon of fans swarming Three Rivers from all directions and pronounced them the 'Steeler Nation'. They are known for employing the terrible towel (a bright yellow cloth) as its unofficial symbol (created by Myron Cope), and as a rallying sign during Steelers' games.

== 1980–1991: Decade of decline ==
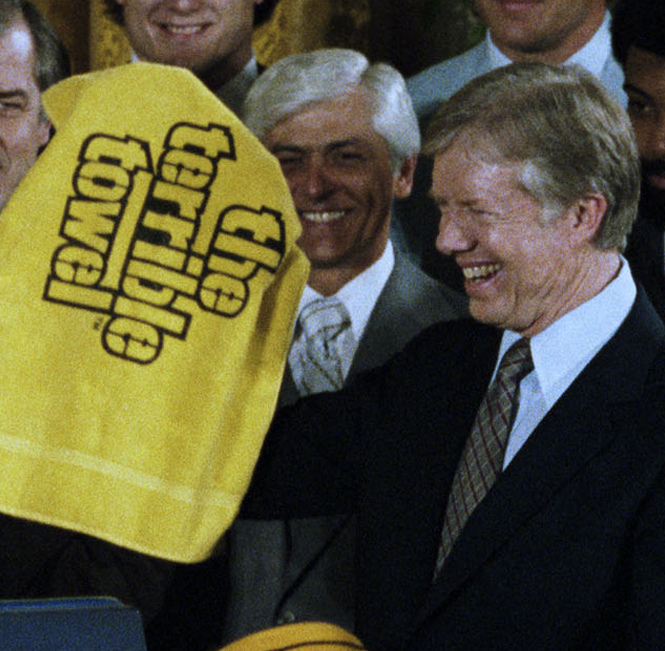
President Jimmy Carter waving a Terrible Towel in 1980 during the Steelers' White House visit after winning Super Bowl XIV

The Steelers were hit with the retirements of all their key players from the Super Bowl years in the 1980s, with Rocky Bleier after the 1980 season, "Mean Joe" Greene and L. C. Greenwood after the 1981 season, Lynn Swann and Jack Ham after 1982, Terry Bradshaw and Mel Blount after 1983, Jack Lambert and Franco Harris after 1984 and John Stallworth after 1987. The team was still very much a playoff contender in the first half of the 80s, then fell on hard times in the second half of the decade.

"One for the thumb in '81" was the rallying cry of the Steelers during the 1980 season as they began their quest for a fifth Super Bowl Ring. It was not so. Hard luck, age, injuries, and an off year by Terry Bradshaw left the Steelers with a 9–7 record, missing the playoffs. This marked the end of the dynasty. They finished the 1981 season with an 8–8 record.

Major changes were made to the Steelers during the next season, including coach Chuck Noll's installment of a 3–4 defense to deal with the league's new pass-oriented rules changes and the departure of Joe Greene and L. C. Greenwood. Pittsburgh managed a 6–3 record nonetheless in 1982 (which was shortened due to a players' strike) and made it to the playoffs for the first time since 1979. In the playoffs they lost when Kellen Winslow caught two touchdowns in the 4th quarter of their first playoff game, a 31–28 loss to the San Diego Chargers.

Bradshaw was sidelined with an elbow injury for most of the 1983 season (his last), with Cliff Stoudt picking up the reins behind center. Franco Harris ran for 1,007 yards in his last season in Pittsburgh (he wound up with the Seattle Seahawks for his final year), and Keith Willis recorded a career-best 13 sacks. The streaky Steelers lost four of their last five regular season games, but their 10–6 record was still good for a division title. The Steelers closed the regular season with an emotional victory against the New York Jets in the last football game ever played at Shea Stadium. Bradshaw, returning from injury, led the Steelers to the lead with two touchdown passes. He left the game in the first half after hearing a "pop" in his elbow when making his final pass, a touchdown. The Steelers made another quick first-round playoff exit, a 38–10 embarrassment against the Los Angeles Raiders.

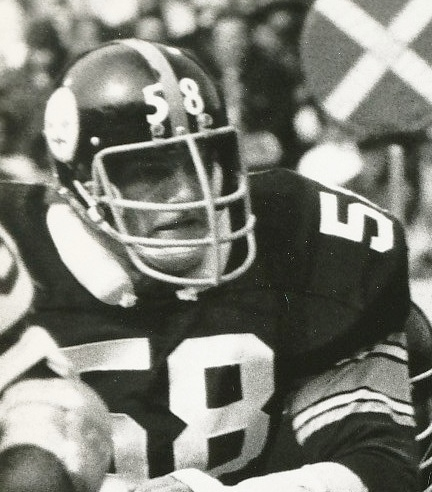
Jack Lambert retired following the 1984 season

1984 was supposed to be a rebuilding year. Mark Malone and David Woodley split quarterbacking duties, with Frank Pollard taking over at running back and Offensive Rookie of the Year Louis Lipps shining at wide receiver. The Steelers' 9–7 record won them another division title. Among the nine victories, the Steelers handed San Francisco its only loss of the season, en route to an impressive 18 win season and Super Bowl championship. In the divisional playoff against the Denver Broncos, the Steelers came back in the fourth quarter to win 24–17, but they lost the AFC Championship to Dan Marino (the Pittsburgh native whom the Steelers passed up in the 1983 Draft) and the Dolphins, 45–28.

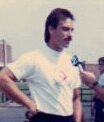
Mark Malone (c.1984)

Despite career seasons from Lipps and Pollard, the Steelers' 1985 campaign collapsed in December, with them losing four of their last five to finish at 7–9. In 1986, Malone took over the QB job by himself and Earnest Jackson (who came off back-to-back 1000-yard seasons with the Philadelphia Eagles) was added to the offensive backfield, but the team fared no better, at 6–10. An 8–7 record in 1987 was not enough to save Malone's job in Pittsburgh. Bubby Brister became the Steelers' new starting quarterback.

The 1988 season was the worst for the Steelers in twenty years, with a 5–11 record. Mike Webster was cut during the offseason; the team's founder, Art Rooney died before the start of the 1988 regular season. The 1989 team also got rough start, but won five of their last six to finish 9–7, enough for a wild card playoff spot. In the wild-card playoff game against the Houston Oilers, the Steelers staged a desperate fourth-quarter comeback to win 26–23 in overtime on a 50-yard field goal by Gary Anderson. The game cost Houston coach Jerry Glanville his job. However, in their divisional game against the Denver Broncos, it was John Elway who staged the last-minute comeback and the Steelers went home with a 24–23 loss. Defensive back Rod Woodson, in his third season, made the first of seven consecutive Pro Bowls.

The Steelers finished 9–7 in 1990 led by the No. 1 defense in the NFL in terms of yards allowed. The defense was led by the secondary (mainly the superb Rod Woodson) which was particularly effective limiting opposing passers to just 9 touchdown passes while intercepting 19 (the Steelers intercepted 24 total as a team). The 1990 season ended with another disappointment however as the Steelers lost twice in three weeks to the Cincinnati Bengals, and lost the season's final game on the road to the Houston Oilers to miss out on the playoffs.

The 1991 season saw rookie quarterback Neil O'Donnell show some flashes of brilliance, but the rest of the team faltered and the Steelers finished 7–9.

== 1992–2006: Bill Cowher's years ==
Chuck Noll, the Steelers' coach since 1969, retired at the end of the 1991 season. Noll was replaced by Kansas City Chiefs defensive coordinator Bill Cowher, a native of the Pittsburgh suburb of Crafton. Cowher led the Steelers to the playoffs in each of his first six seasons as coach, a feat that had only previously been accomplished by legendary coach Paul Brown of the Cleveland Browns.

=== 1992–1994: Return to playoff success ===
Cowher made an immediate impact in the 1992 season, as did third-year running back Barry Foster whose 1,690 yards was second in the NFL behind Emmitt Smith. Woodson recorded six sacks, a career-high. The Steelers' 11–5 record won them the AFC Central title and a first-round playoff bye. Their hopes, however, came to a crashing end against the surging Buffalo Bills, in a 24–3 loss.

Near the end of the 1993 season, the team collapsed, starting 6–3 but finishing 9–7. They clinched the final playoff spot at 9–7, and travelled to Arrowhead Stadium to face the Kansas City Chiefs in the wild card round. Leading 24–17 with two minutes left, the Steelers defense gave up a Joe Montana fourth-down touchdown pass to Tim Barnett to tie the game. In overtime, the Chiefs won on a Nick Lowery field goal.

The 1994 season brought back memories of the 1970s Steeler teams. Barry Foster was joined in the backfield by rookie Bam Morris, and together they gained almost 1,700 rushing yards. The "Steel Curtain" defense made a resurgence, with Kevin Greene responsible for 14 sacks and Greg Lloyd tacking on 10 more. The Steelers' 12–4 record clinched them home-field advantage throughout the AFC playoffs. In the divisional playoff Pittsburgh walloped the Cleveland Browns 29–9, and were heavily favored in the conference championship against the San Diego Chargers. The Steelers seemed to dominate when the numbers were crunched: O'Donnell passed for 349 yards to Stan Humphries' 165, and had a nearly 2–1 edge in time of possession. But they gave up a 13–3 lead in the 3rd quarter when Alfred Pupunu and Tony Martin caught touchdowns of 43 yards each, and it was the Chargers who advanced to Super Bowl XXIX, by the score of 17–13. The 1994 Steelers finished their disappointing season three yards away from their first Super Bowl appearance since 1980 as an O'Donnell pass to Foster was batted down. This play epitomized the Steelers' season – incomplete. AFC Championship collapses, unfortunately for the Steelers, would become a hallmark of the Cowher era.

=== 1995: Loss in the Super Bowl ===
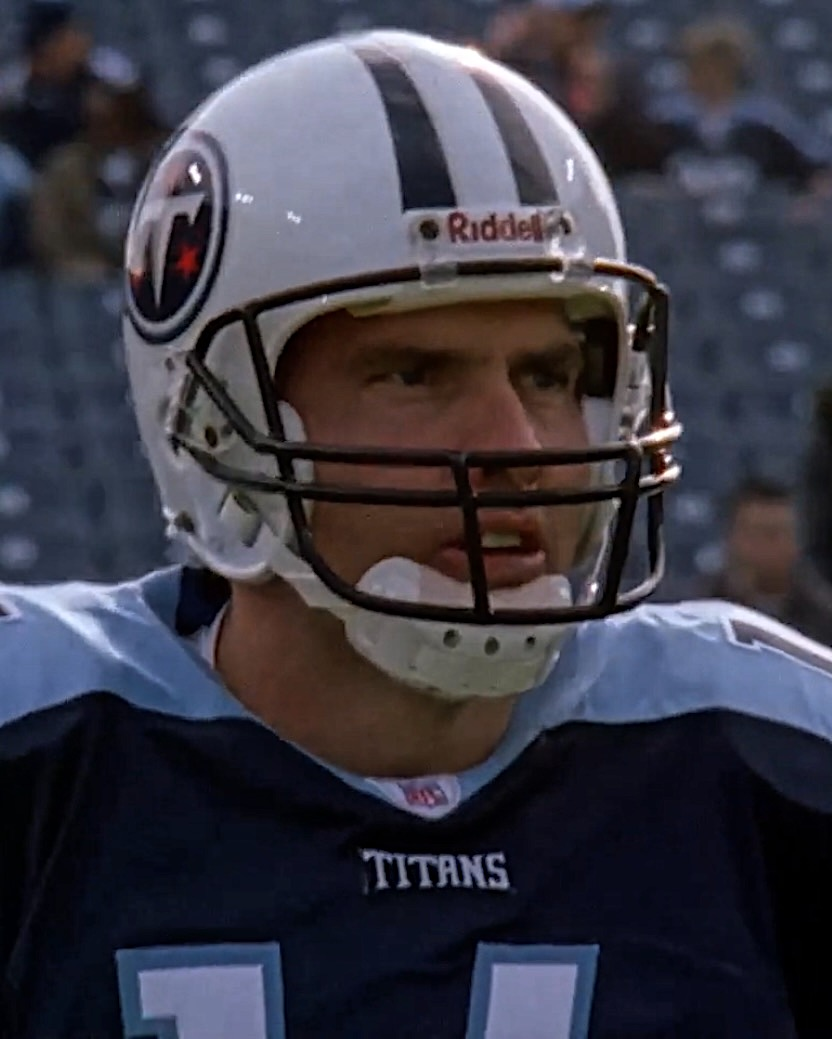
Neil O'Donnell (pictured with the Titans) led the Steelers to their first Super Bowl since the 1979 season

The Steelers' 1995 campaign was no less dominant. Foster left the team, but Erric Pegram (picked up from the Atlanta Falcons) made up for it with an 800-yard season. Yancey Thigpen amassed 1,307 receiving yards and Willie Williams had seven interceptions. The Steelers' 11–5 record once again won them the division and a first-round bye. As in 1994, the Steelers dominated in the divisional playoff (a 40–21 win over the Buffalo Bills), but the cinderella Indianapolis Colts put up a fight in the AFC championship. There were four lead changes, the last when Bam Morris scored a one-yard touchdown with 1:34 remaining. Colts quarterback Jim Harbaugh threw a "hail mary" that was dropped by Aaron Bailey in the end zone. The Steelers narrowly won, 20–16, and went on to play the Dallas Cowboys in Super Bowl XXX.

The Cowboys, a team that thought themselves to be just as dominant in the 1990s as the Steelers were in the 1970s heyday, jumped to a quick 13–0 lead. Pittsburgh showed some signs of life, such as a Yancey Thigpen touchdown before halftime, and a surprise onside kick recovery that led to a Bam Morris touchdown run narrowing the score to 20–17, late in the 4th quarter. The Steeler defense quickly forced Dallas into punting the ball back to the Steeler offense and Neil O'Donnell threw his second and worst interception of the game, similar to his first, halting the Steelers come from behind win. Both interceptions gave Dallas easy touchdown situations. O'Donnell's three interceptions contributed heavily to the Steelers' 27–17 loss.

=== 1996–2003: Losing seasons and playoff disappointment ===
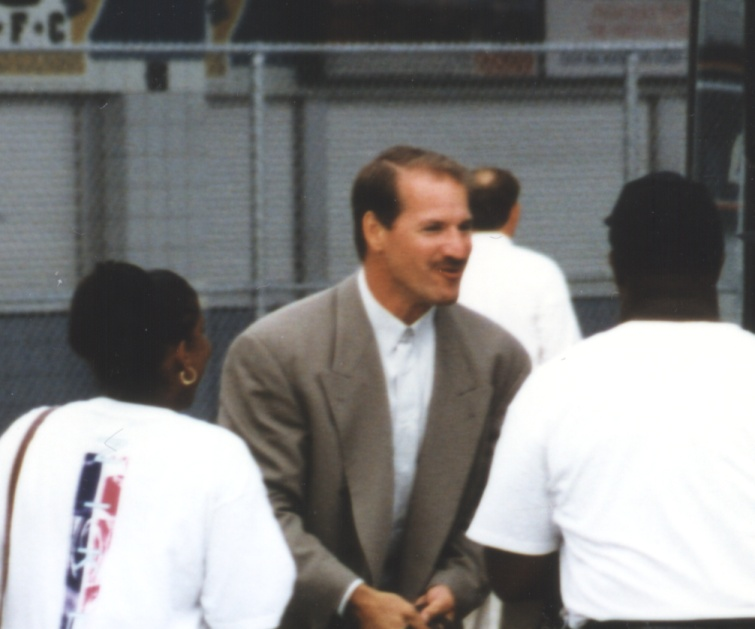
Bill Cowher in 1996

Super Bowl XXX was O'Donnell's last game with the Steelers before signing with the New York Jets. Pittsburgh drafted Kordell Stewart (a wide receiver who also played quarterback) in 1995, but Mike Tomczak started in 1996. The Steelers traded for Jerome Bettis, who rushed for 1,400 yards. Despite a late-season decline, their 10–6 record secured the division. They defeated the Colts 42–14 in the wild-card round but lost 28–3 to the New England Patriots in the divisional round.

Stewart became the starter in 1997, passing for 3,000 yards and 21 touchdowns. Bettis and Yancey Thigpen each surpassed 1,000 yards. The Steelers finished 11–5, earning a first-round bye. They defeated the Patriots 7–6 in the divisional round but lost the AFC Championship 24–21 to the eventual champion Denver Broncos.

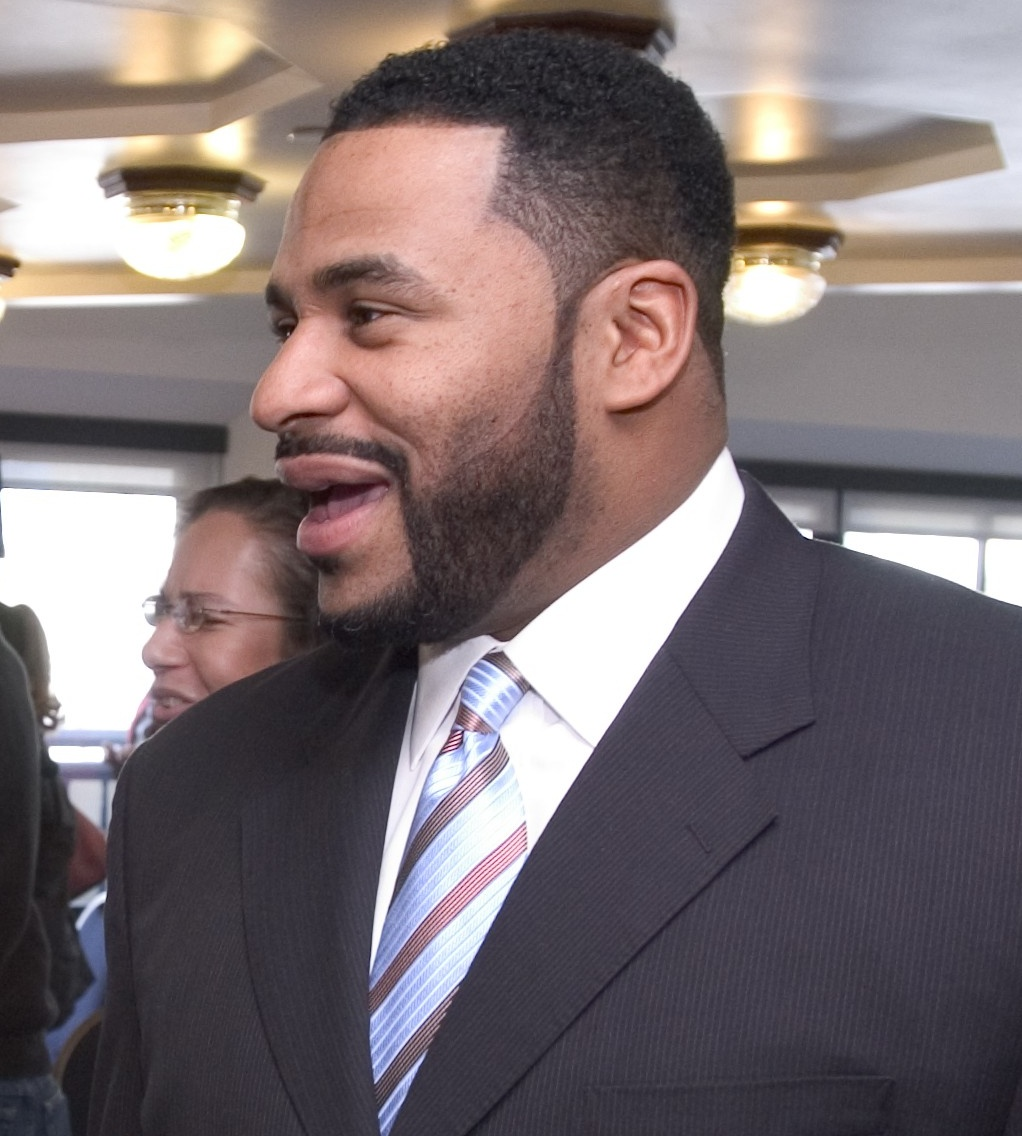
Jerome Bettis was a hard-nosed ball carrier who fit the Steelers style of play.

The 1998 Steelers started 7–4 but missed the playoffs after five straight losses. The Thanksgiving loss to the Detroit Lions was marked by a controversial overtime coin toss involving Phil Luckett and Jerome Bettis in which Bettis. The game was tied 16–16 at the end of regulation when the referee told team captain Jerome Bettis to call "heads" or "tails" as he flipped the coin in the air. Bettis stammered while making the call, and referee (Phil Luckett) stated "the Steelers called heads; its tails." This caused an uproar from Bettis and the Steelers, as replays seemed to show that Bettis clearly called "tails". Contrary to many press reports, Luckett did not make a mistake in this incident. A week after the game, the tape was enhanced by local Pittsburgh TV station KDKA-TV and Bettis is clearly heard saying "hea-tails". A sideline microphone enhancement also clearly had Bettis telling Coach Bill Cowher that (Bettis) had said "hea-tails". The Steelers never got to touch the ball again and went on to lose 19–16. They would lose their next four games and would end up finishing 7–9. The team followed up the disappointing season by finishing with an even worse 6–10 record. This was their worst record in 11 years. Despite a 4–3 start to the season heading into the bye week, the Steelers would go 2–7 on the remainder of the season.

In 2000, Kent Graham started at quarterback but was replaced by Stewart as the Steelers finished 9–7, missing the playoffs for a third straight year despite Bettis rushing for 1,341 yards and Jason Gildon earning a Pro Bowl selection with 13.5 sacks. The team won its final game at Three Rivers Stadium, and the NFL later apologized for officiating errors that impacted their season. Moving to Heinz Field in 2001, the Steelers went 13–3, with Hines Ward and Plaxico Burress each surpassing 1,000 receiving yards, while rookie Kendrell Bell won NFL Defensive Rookie of the Year. Bettis suffered a knee injury late in the season but was replaced by Chris Fuamatu-Ma'afala and Amos Zereoué, who helped secure a 27–10 divisional-round win over the Baltimore Ravens before a 24–17 AFC Championship loss to the New England Patriots due to special teams errors. In 2002, Stewart was benched for Tommy Maddox, who led the team to a 10–5–1 record and an AFC North title, including a comeback from a 24–7 deficit to defeat the Cleveland Browns 36–33 in the wild-card round, but they fell 34–31 in overtime to the Tennessee Titans after a controversial running-into-the-kicker penalty. The 2003 season saw a shift toward a pass-heavy offense and multiple injuries, resulting in a 6–10 finish, with Maddox throwing 18 touchdowns and 17 interceptions while Bettis and Burress failed to reach 1,000 yards.

=== 2004–2006: Super Bowl XL win and Cowher's retirement ===
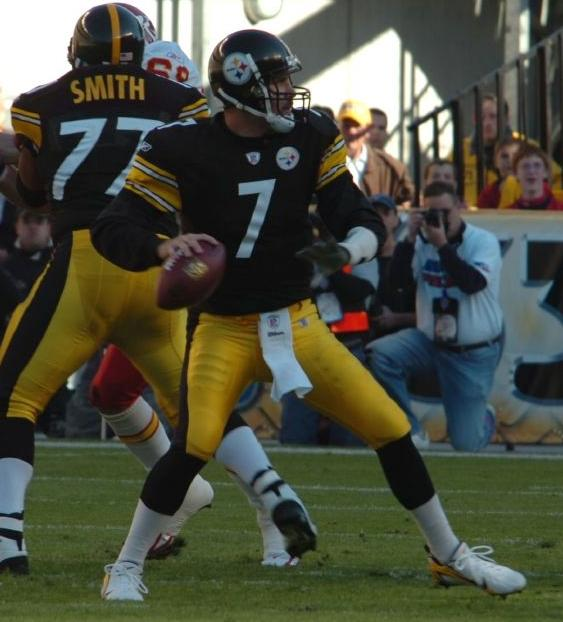
Ben Roethlisberger in 2006.

In the 2004 draft, the Steelers took quarterback Ben Roethlisberger from Miami University (Ohio) in the first round. Maddox kept the starting job until he was injured in the second game of the season, in Baltimore, against the Ravens. Roethlisberger was pushed into action and immediately wowed fans. "Big Ben" did not lose a game during the entire regular season, setting a record for most consecutive games won with a rookie quarterback to start a career. Included were back-to-back convincing wins over the New England Patriots (breaking their record 21-game winning streak) and eventual NFC champion Philadelphia Eagles. By the end of the season, Roethlisberger and the rest of the Steelers were starting to show signs of wear, but they still escaped with victories every time. The Steelers completed the 2004 regular season with the best record in the NFL at 15–1, which is also their best 16-game season.

After 2003's failed attempt to focus on the passing game, the 2004 team returned to the typical Steelers formula, a run-heavy offense (61/39 run-pass ratio) and a strong defense. The team's dominant running game, featuring Jerome Bettis and Duce Staley (acquired prior to the season in free agency), was bolstered by an efficient and often explosive passing attack led by Roethlisberger and receivers Burress, Ward, and Antwaan Randle El. The defense, one of the league's best, was anchored by Pro Bowl linebackers James Farrior and Joey Porter and Pro Bowl safety Troy Polamalu. Only three previous teams (The '84 49ers, the '85 Bears, & the '98 Vikings) had a 15-win season, with the Steelers being the first AFC team to accomplish this feat. As a result of this dominant season, the Steelers received home field advantage throughout the AFC playoffs.

Their divisional playoff game was against the Wild Card New York Jets. Roethlisberger threw two interceptions, one of which was returned for a touchdown by Reggie Tongue, but a Hines Ward touchdown catch tied the game at 17–17 in the fourth quarter. Jets kicker Doug Brien had two chances to win the game with a field goal in the final two minutes of regulation, but one kick hit the crossbar, while the other went wide left. Jeff Reed kicked a field goal 11:04 into the extra period to win the game, 20–17.

The Steelers were back in the AFC Championship, once again in Pittsburgh, for a rematch with the Patriots. New England went out to a big lead early after two first-quarter turnovers by the Steelers. In the second quarter, Rodney Harrison intercepted Roethlisberger (who had three picks overall) and returned it for a touchdown. The Steelers showed some signs of life in the third quarter, but it was not enough. The Patriots, another dynasty team that has been compared with the 1970s Steelers, won 41–27. This defeat marked the fourth time in ten years that the Steelers had lost the conference title game at home under Bill Cowher.

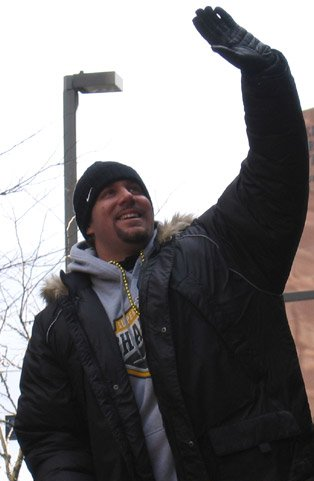
Steelers QB Ben Roethlisberger at the Steelers Super Bowl XL victory parade in downtown Pittsburgh

Despite losing Plaxico Burress to free agency (he ended up with the New York Giants), the Steelers took some steps to ensure a return to the postseason. They first selected TE Heath Miller from the University of Virginia in the 2005 NFL draft. Other picks included Florida State CB Bryant McFadden, Northwestern University OG Trai Essex, Georgia University WR Fred Gibson, and Temple University LB Rian Wallace.

In 2005, the Steelers hoped to make another post-season run. Injuries to Jerome Bettis and Duce Staley caused Willie Parker to become the Steelers' starter at running back, and he acquitted himself very well in two convincing wins against the Tennessee Titans (34–7) and Houston Texans (27–7) to open the season. In the next game, however, the visiting New England Patriots handed Ben Roethlisberger his first regular-season loss as the Steelers lost the much-hyped rematch of the 2004 AFC Championship Game 23–20. Two weeks later, Pittsburgh came back to defeat the throwback-clad San Diego Chargers 24–22 on a 40-yard field goal by Jeff Reed. The victory proved costly as Roethlisberger suffered an injury when he was hit on his left knee by the helmet of Chargers rookie lineman Luis Castillo. So Tommy Maddox was named starter for their home game against the Jacksonville Jaguars. The Steelers struggled throughout the game, as Maddox threw two interceptions through regulation, but they managed to tie at 17 going into OT. Maddox threw an interception to Jags DB Rashean Mathis, who returned it 41 yards for a touchdown, as the Steelers fell, 23–17. Maddox's off-field arguments with head coach Bill Cowher cost him his No. 1 back-up spot. Roethlisberger was able to play in their next road game against their division rival, the Cincinnati Bengals. Despite winning 27–13, his left knee needed surgery. Roethlisberger fought through a lot of pain in the Steelers' 20–19 Monday Night victory over the Baltimore Ravens but reaggravated his knee injuries. Charlie Batch was named the starter, and he provided victories over the struggling Green Bay Packers (20–10 on the road), and against their rust belt rival, the Cleveland Browns (34–21 at home), where during the game, wide receiver Hines Ward set the Steelers record for most career receptions (543), breaking John Stallworth's mark of 537. Batch broke his hand, which sent him to the sidelines. Tommy Maddox was given the start for their road game against the Ravens, but again, he showed his inefficiency, as the Steelers fell in overtime 16–13. After Roethlisberger's return, the Steelers lost their first two games against the then-undefeated Indianapolis Colts (26–7 on the road) and at home against the resurgent Bengals (38–31), but recovered to win the last four regular-season games (21–9 vs. Bears, 18–3 @ Vikings, 41–0 @ Browns, and 35–21 vs. Lions) to clinch the sixth and last seed in the AFC playoffs.

During the last game of the regular season in Pittsburgh, the Steelers fans gave Jerome Bettis a standing ovation when he was taken out of the game in the fourth quarter by Bill Cowher. It was the last game in Pittsburgh for Bettis, as he announced his retirement after the Steelers' ultimate victory in Super Bowl XL. Bettis finished the game with 41 yards rushing and 3 touchdowns, and gave the team a boost after the Lions had taken a 14–7 first quarter lead.

On Sunday, January 8, 2006, the Steelers traveled to Paul Brown Stadium for their Wild Card match-up against the Cincinnati Bengals. On the Bengals' second offensive play, Bengal quarterback Carson Palmer launched a 66-yard completion – the longest in Bengals' playoff history – to receiver Chris Henry while Steelers defensive tackle Kimo von Oelhoffen tried to sack him. Many Bengals fans believed von Oelhoffen's hit to Palmer's leg, striking his left knee from the side and was carted off the field, was intentional. A magnetic resonance imaging test revealed that both Palmer's anterior cruciate and medial collateral ligaments were torn by von Oelhoffen's contact, which also caused cartilage and meniscus damage. Von Oelhoffen's hit did not generate a defensive penalty because Bengals guard Eric Steinbach pushed von Oelhoffen into Palmer.

Backup quarterback Jon Kitna filled in for Palmer and threw 1 touchdown pass and two interceptions. Despite trailing after the first quarter, the Steelers came within three points, trailing 17–14 at the half. Eventually, they shut out the Bengals in the second half and scored 17 points to win, 31–17.

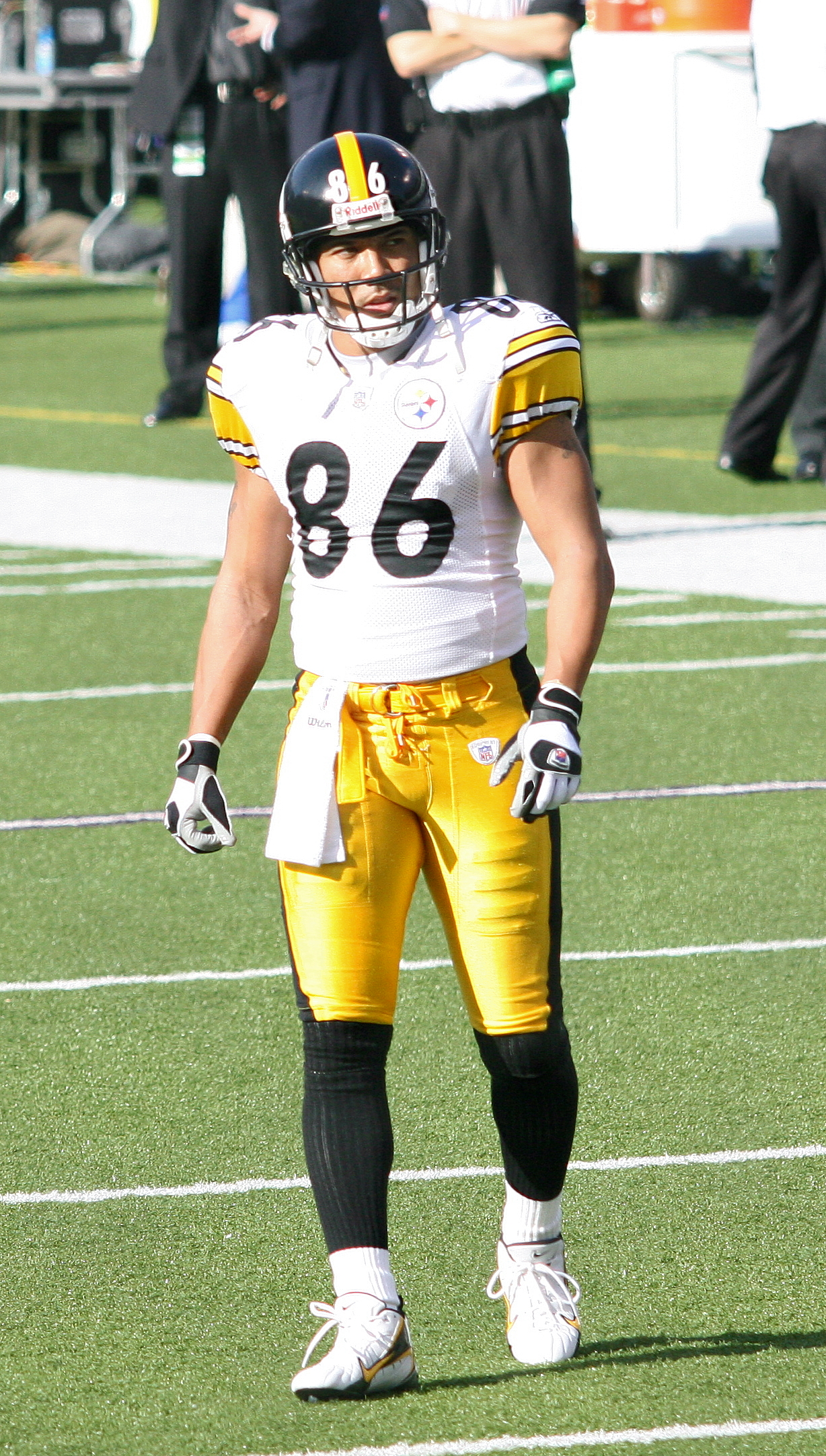
Hines Ward, the MVP of Super Bowl XL

On Sunday, January 15, the Steelers traveled to the RCA Dome in Indianapolis, Indiana where they faced the No. 1 seeded Colts, and defeated them 21–18 in spite of a highly improbable fourth quarter—including a controversial call reversal that turned a crucial Troy Polamalu interception into an incomplete pass—which found the suddenly revitalized Colts offense with a chance to turn the game around. After recovering an unlikely Jerome Bettis fumble on the Colts 1 with just over a minute remaining, Colts cornerback Nick Harper sped downfield toward what would have been a game-winning touchdown, only to be tripped up by Steelers quarterback Ben Roethlisberger in a shoe-string tackle. This heads-up play probably prevented a game-winning touchdown for the Colts. The Steelers defense held their ground on the ensuing Colts drive, leaving the Colts with just one last chance to tie and send the game into overtime. But Colts kicker Mike Vanderjagt, one of the most accurate kickers in NFL history, missed a 46-yard field goal attempt—wide right—with :18 left in the fourth quarter. The game was the first time in NFL history that a sixth seed (Pittsburgh) defeated a first seed (Indianapolis Colts) in the playoffs. It also marked the first time that a sixth seed would get to play in a Conference Championship game.

On Sunday January 22, 2006, the Steelers won their 6th AFC Championship at INVESCO Field at Mile High in Denver, Colorado when they beat the Denver Broncos 34–17. Quarterback Ben Roethlisberger completed a 21 out of 29 passes, 2 of which were touchdowns. He also ran for another touchdown as he led the team to victory. It marked the 1st time since the 1985–86 New England Patriots and the second time in NFL history that a Wild Card team would get to the Super Bowl after winning the Wild Card Round, the Divisional Round, and the Conference Championship on the road. It also marked the first time that a sixth-seeded team would get to play in the Super Bowl.

In the Steelers' first trip to the Super Bowl since the 1995 season, they defeated the Seattle Seahawks 21–10 in Super Bowl XL on February 5, 2006, at Ford Field in Detroit, Michigan. The game had been hyped as a homecoming for Detroit native Jerome Bettis. Records were set for longest run from scrimmage (75 yards for touchdown by Willie Parker of the Steelers), longest interception return (76 yards by Seahawks CB Kelly Herndon), and the first touchdown pass by a wide receiver (thrown by Antwaan Randle El to Hines Ward on a reverse).

The Steelers become the first 6th-seeded team, since the NFL changed to a 12-team playoff format in 1990, to go to the Super Bowl and win. Their playoff campaign included defeating the first (Indianapolis), second (Denver), and third (Cincinnati) seeded AFC teams en route to the Super Bowl victory against the first seeded Seahawks from the NFC. Also, they are the first NFL team to win 9 road games. Roethlisberger became the youngest QB to win a Super Bowl. They successfully tied with the San Francisco 49ers and the Dallas Cowboys for the most Super Bowl titles with five.

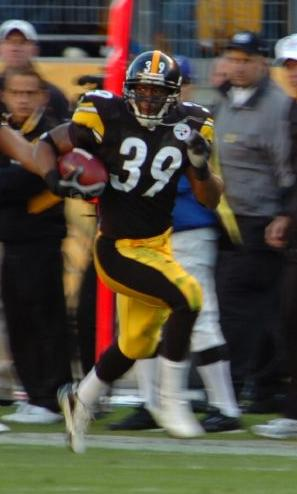
Willie Parker in 2006.

The 2006 Pittsburgh Steelers season began with the team trying to improve on their 11–5 record from 2005 and trying to defend their Super Bowl XL championship. They finished the season 8–8 and did not make it to the playoffs.

Hoping to end their season on a high note, the Steelers flew to Paul Brown Stadium for an AFC North rematch with the Cincinnati Bengals. After a scoreless first quarter, Pittsburgh drew first blood in the second quarter with RB Willie Parker getting a 1-yard TD run. Afterwards, the Bengals would manage to salvage a 34-yard field goal by kicker Shayne Graham. After a scoreless third quarter, Cincinnati took the lead by getting a Willie Parker fumble and ending it with QB Carson Palmer completing a 66-yard TD pass to WR Chris Henry. Parker managed to make amends with another 1-yard TD run. However, the Bengals went back into the lead with Palmer completing a 5-yard TD pass to TE Tony Stewart. The Steelers would manage to tie the game late in the game with kicker Jeff Reed nailing a 35-yard field goal. Cincinnati quickly managed to get into field goal range, but Graham's 39-yard field goal went wide right. In overtime, Pittsburgh took advantage and won with QB Ben Roethlisberger's 67-yard TD pass to rookie WR Santonio Holmes. With the win, not only did the Steelers end their season at 8–8, but they also wiped out any hope that the Bengals had of reaching the playoffs.

== 2007–2026: Mike Tomlin's years ==
=== 2007–2010: Super Bowl XLIII and XLV ===
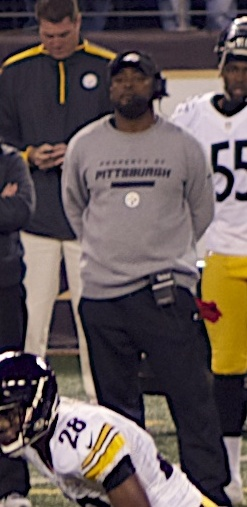
Mike Tomlin guided the team to first place in the AFC North as a rookie head coach

The 2007 Pittsburgh Steelers season saw the team improve upon their 8–8 record from 2006, finish with a record of 10–6, and win the AFC North Division. The season marked the 75th anniversary of the Steelers franchise. The Steelers' 2007 schedule included two notable playoff rematches. The Steelers played the New England Patriots December 9 for the first time in the regular season since 2005, when they lost at home on a last-second Adam Vinatieri field goal 23–20. The 34–13 loss was also the Steelers' first visit to Foxboro, Massachusetts since 2002. The Steelers defeated the Seattle Seahawks 21–0 in week 5 on October 7, the teams' first meeting since the Steelers' 21–10 victory in Super Bowl XL 20 months earlier. The week 5 match was the Steelers' and Seahawks' first meeting in Pittsburgh since 1999 as well as the Seahawks' first-ever visit to Heinz Field. Another notable game occurred December 20 when the Steelers defeated the St. Louis Rams, 41–24, for their first-ever road win over the Cleveland/Los Angeles/St. Louis Rams (1–9–1). It was the two teams' first-ever meeting in St. Louis, a city the Steelers last visited in 1979 (a 24–21 win over the then-St. Louis Cardinals at Busch Memorial Stadium).

Six players from the Steelers were selected to play in the 2007 Pro Bowl. Two started, two were selected to the reserve squad, and two did not play due to injury. (Ben Roethlisberger, Willie Parker, Troy Polamalu, Alan Faneca, James Harrison, and Casey Hampton)

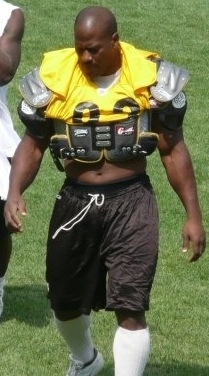
James Harrison in 2008.

Entering the 2008 season, the Pittsburgh Steelers lost Alan Faneca, after his contract expired and he signed with the New York Jets. The Steelers also signed quarterback Ben Roethlisberger to an eight-year, $102 million contract, the largest in franchise history. The Steelers also drafted Rashard Mendenhall, running back from Illinois, with the 23rd overall pick in the 2008 NFL draft as well as top wide receiver prospect Limas Sweed of Texas with the 53rd overall pick. With injury to Willie Parker and uncertainty about his future production, Mendenhall was drafted to be the next Steelers running back of the future. The regular season went well with the team winning twelve games and losing four, all to strong opponents, with their only losses going to the Philadelphia Eagles, the New York Giants, the Indianapolis Colts, and the Tennessee Titans (who had the best record in the league). The team thus earned a first-round bye and home advantage through the playoffs. James Harrison was voted as the 2008 AP Defensive Player of the Year with a monstrous regular season performance with 16 sacks (fourth in league) and 7 forced fumbles (first in the league). Troy Polamalu also had a great season, gaining seven interceptions which was tied for second in the league, trailing only Ed Reed of the Baltimore Ravens who had 9. Beating San Diego in the divisional round, they faced their AFC North rival Baltimore in the conference championship and soundly defeated them. Thus, the Steelers made it to their seventh Super Bowl. Their opponent was the Arizona Cardinals, a team that had not appeared in any league championship since 1948.

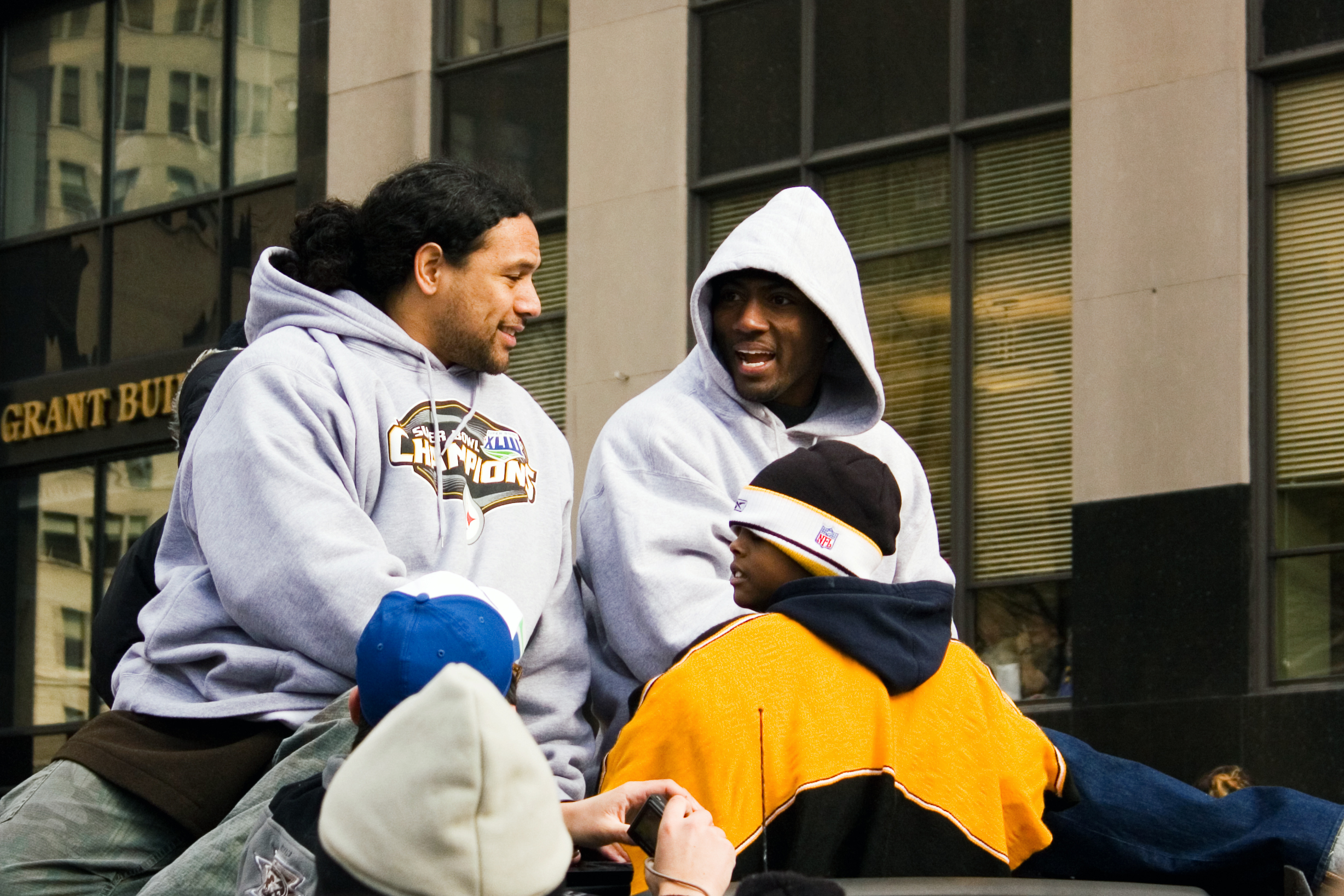
Steelers defenders Troy Polamalu (left) and Ryan Clark (right) at the Super Bowl XLIII victory parade in Pittsburgh.

Super Bowl XLIII was played on February 1, 2009, at the Buccaneers' Raymond James Stadium. By halftime, the Steelers were ahead at 17–7. Arizona's effort was hampered by penalties, in particular three personal fouls, but they managed to get ahead after wide receiver Larry Fitzgerald scored a 63-yard touchdown, bringing the score to 23–20. But Pittsburgh's Santonio Holmes was able to convert a 6-yard touchdown in the final two minutes. With that, the game ended 27–23 and the Steelers gained their sixth championship, becoming the first team to win six Super Bowls since the start of the Super Bowl era.

The defending champions began the 2009 campaign in good form, winning six of their first eight matches. However, a major loss came as the Steelers lost Troy Polamalu in Week 1 against the Tennessee Titans. Polamalu came back in Week 6 against the Browns and played until Week 10 against the Bengals when he reinjured himself in the game. This effectively ended the rest of Polamalu's season. But starting in Week 10, things crumbled as Pittsburgh dropped five in a row, including losses to Kansas City and Oakland, two of the league's weakest teams. The ultimate disaster came in Week 14, when an unprepared, injury-compromised Steelers team lost to the 1–11 Cleveland Browns for the first time since 2003. Pittsburgh managed to snap its losing streak in the next game, where they beat Green Bay by one point with Ben Roethlisberger throwing a career-best 504 passing yards. They then won against Baltimore the following week, and on the season ender defeated Miami to finish 9–7. However, the Ravens' victory over Oakland later that day kept Pittsburgh from the playoffs. Throughout the season, the Steelers struggled harshly on special teams, giving up four kickoff return touchdowns. The Steelers sent 4 players to the Pro Bowl: Tight end Heath Miller (76 receptions, 789 receiving yards, and 6 touchdowns), nose tackle Casey Hampton (43 tackles/23 solo, and 2 sacks), and linebackers James Harrison (79 tackles/60 solo, 10 sacks, and 5 forced fumbles) and LaMarr Woodley (62 tackles/50 solo, 13 sacks, and 1 forced fumble).

The 2010 off-season proved a disaster for the Steelers as Ben Roethlisberger was accused of unwelcome sexual advances on a woman he met in a bar. Although no charges were filed, the woman and her group of friends were seen by people that were there, following Roethlisberger and friends from bar to bar. Interesting to note the woman was 20 years old and was served alcoholic drinks at the bars in question. NFL Commissioner Roger Goodell suspended him for six games for violating the NFL's personal conduct policy. However, on September 6, his suspension was reduced to four games. Roethlisberger was also barred from attending the team's games and could only practice with free agents during this period. Dennis Dixon and Charlie Batch would fill in as the starting QB.

Despite dire predictions, the Steelers hosted Atlanta on the season opener and won in overtime 15–9. They then traveled to Tennessee and knocked out their former division rival 19–11 in an outstanding defensive game. In Week 3, the Steelers beat Tampa Bay 38–13 before losing their first divisional match against Baltimore 17–14. Roethlisberger meanwhile prepared to make his comeback as the team entered its bye week prior to hosting Cleveland in Week 6. He was given a standing ovation by Steelers fans and delivered a fine 28–10 win over the Browns. The Steelers then beat the Dolphins 23–22 before losing to the Saints 20–10. Next week, Pittsburgh played on Monday Night in Cincinnati, where they held off a Bengals comeback to win 27–21. The Steelers then lost on their own turf to Tom Brady and the New England Patriots 39–26. Pittsburgh would then win 4 in a row, 35–3 vs. Oakland, 19–16 in OT at Buffalo, 13–10 at Baltimore, and 23–7 vs. Cincinnati. The streak ended Week 15 in a 22–17 home loss to the New York Jets. Pittsburgh would then win their last 2 games by a combined score of 68–12, beating Carolina 27–3, and then finishing out at Cleveland, 41–9. The Steelers made it through the season finishing 12–4, winning the AFC North division, and winning the AFC's No. 2 seed in the playoffs.

In their first postseason game at home against Baltimore, the Steelers fell behind at halftime 21–7. Pittsburgh made a second half rally and beat the Ravens 31–24. They then defeated the Jets 24–19 in the AFC Championship to earn the right to go to Super Bowl XLV. Against the Green Bay Packers in the Super Bowl, the Steelers fell behind 21–3, but fought back to make the score 21–17. A Rashard Mendenhall fumble at the start of the 4th quarter proved costly as Green Bay would score to make it 28–17. Pittsburgh would score a TD on a 25-yard pass to Mike Wallace and make the 2-point conversion to make it 28–25. Green Bay took time off the clock on their next drive which they capped off with a Field Goal to make it 31–25. Pittsburgh could not score on their final drive, and would end up losing the game. Though it was a disappointing end, the Steelers' season was considered to be highly successful, as they defied many predictions that they would lose their significance in their division. They also tied the Dallas Cowboys for most Super bowl appearances with eight.

=== 2011–2012: Upset by Broncos ===
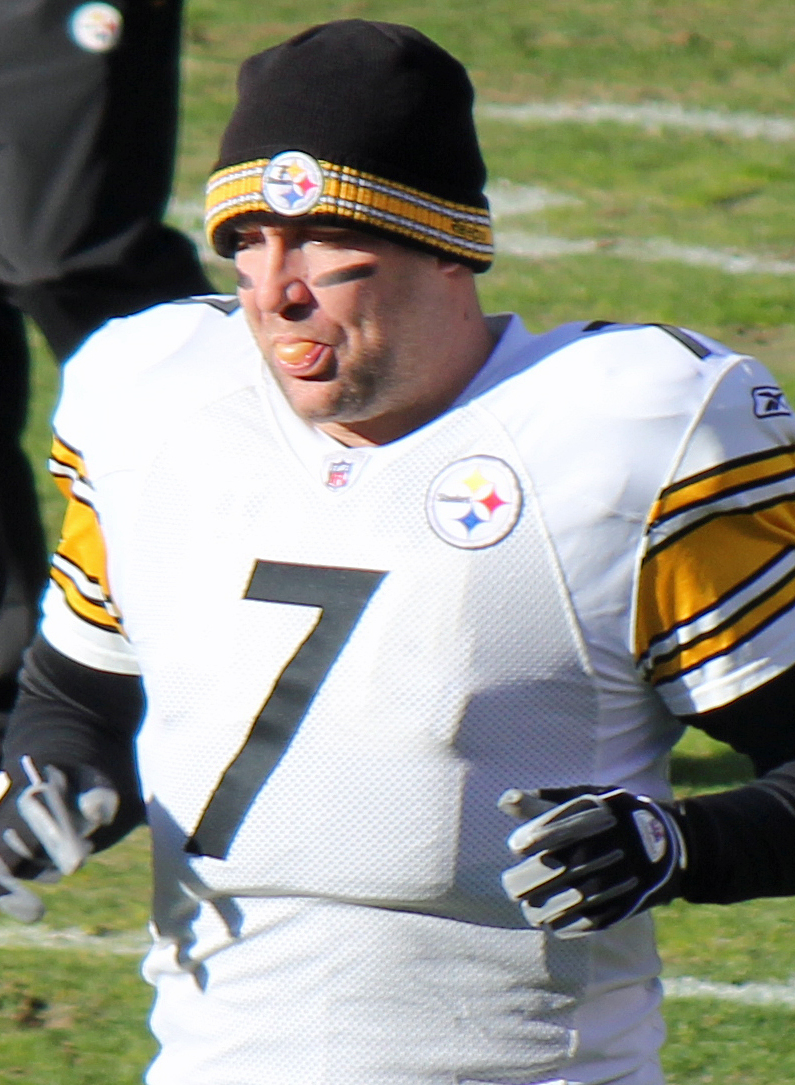
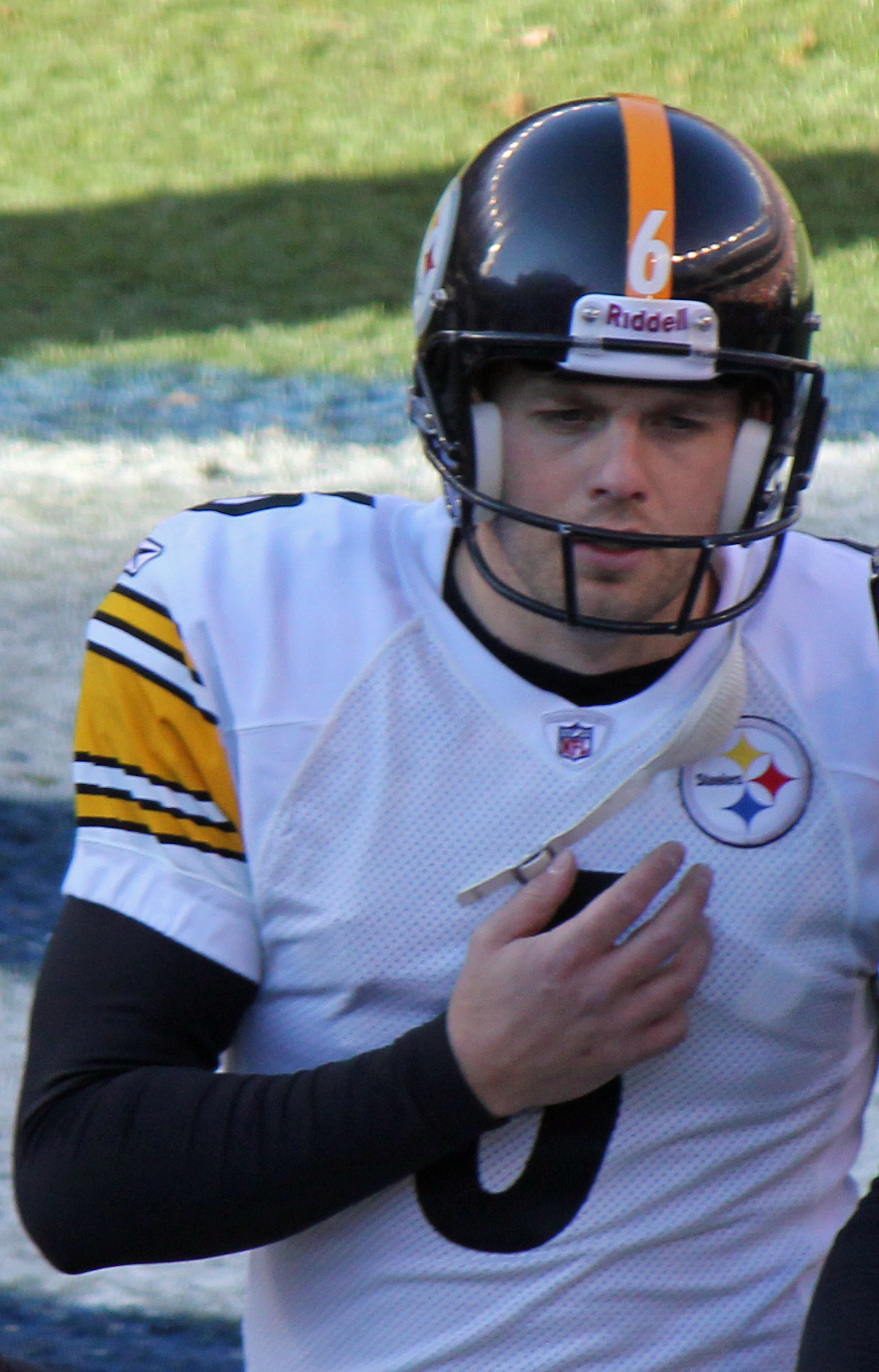
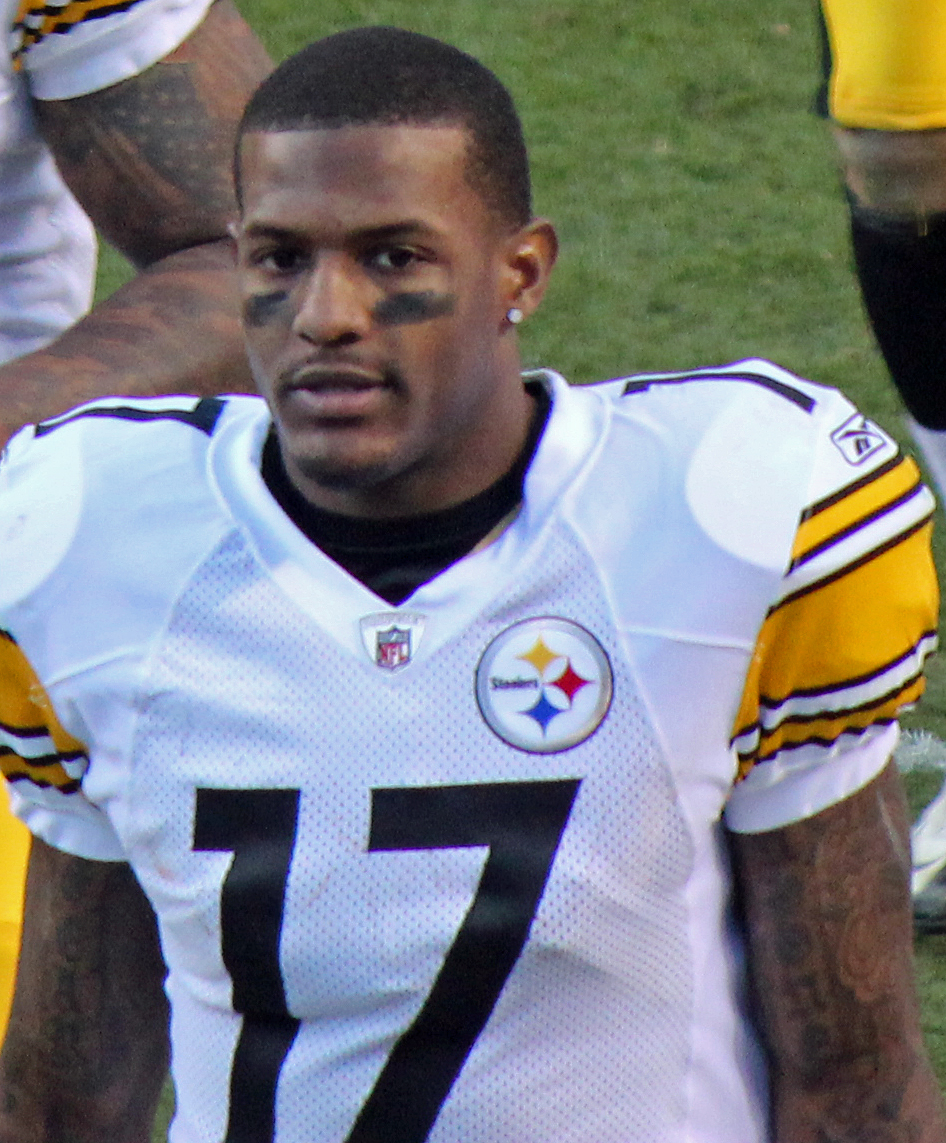
Notable players from the 3:16 game: Ben Roethlisberger (QB), Shaun Suisham (K), Mike Wallace (WR) all pictured during the game

The Steelers opened the 2011 season with a disastrous 35–7 loss to the Baltimore Ravens, committing seven turnovers, including three Ben Roethlisberger interceptions, but rebounded with a 24–0 shutout of Seattle. They edged the Colts 23–20 on a last-second Shaun Suisham field goal but fell 17–10 to Houston as injuries mounted. Roethlisberger, initially sidelined with a foot injury, started in Week 5 and threw five touchdowns in a 38–17 win over Tennessee, followed by victories against Jacksonville (17–13) and Arizona (32–20), where he set a franchise record with a 95-yard touchdown pass to Mike Wallace. The Steelers held Tom Brady to a season-low 198 passing yards in a 25–17 win over New England, then lost to Baltimore before beating Cincinnati 24–17. After a bye, they struggled but won 13–9 in Kansas City, then routed the Bengals 35–7. They secured second place in the AFC North and earned the fifth seed in the AFC at the conclusion of the regular season.

Finishing 12–4, the Steelers faced the 8–8 Broncos in the playoffs, overcoming a 20–6 deficit to force overtime, but on the first play, Tim Tebow connected with Demaryius Thomas for an 80-yard game-winning touchdown. This game would later be known as the 3:16 game and is considered one of the most disappointing post-season outings in team history.

Before the 2012 season, Hines Ward was released and retired. The Steelers went 8–8, missing the playoffs for the first time since 2006, while setting an NFL record with six games decided on the final play but also earning their 400th post-merger victory in a game against the Washington Redskins on October 29, 2012.

=== 2013–2018: "Killer B's" era ===
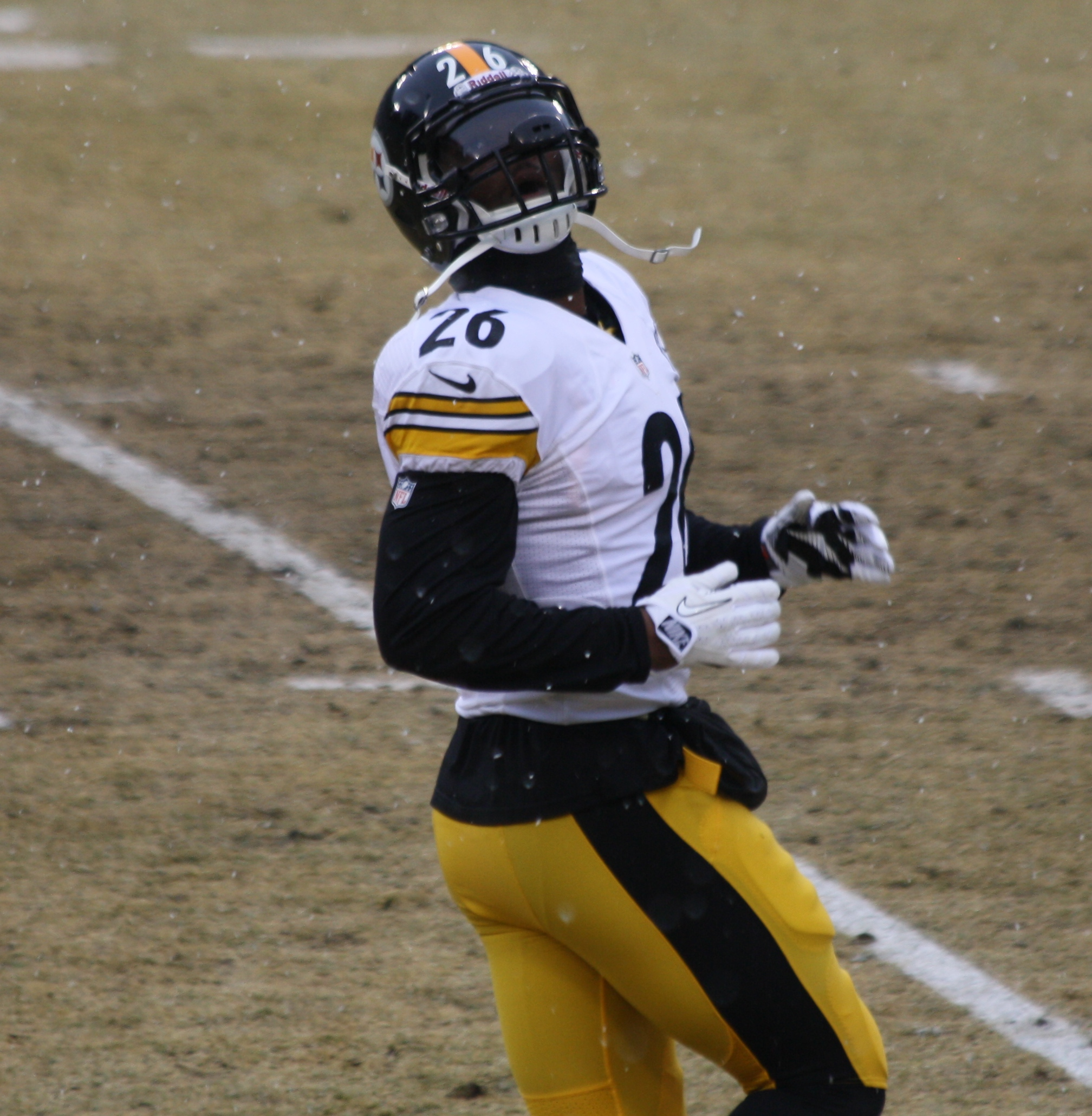
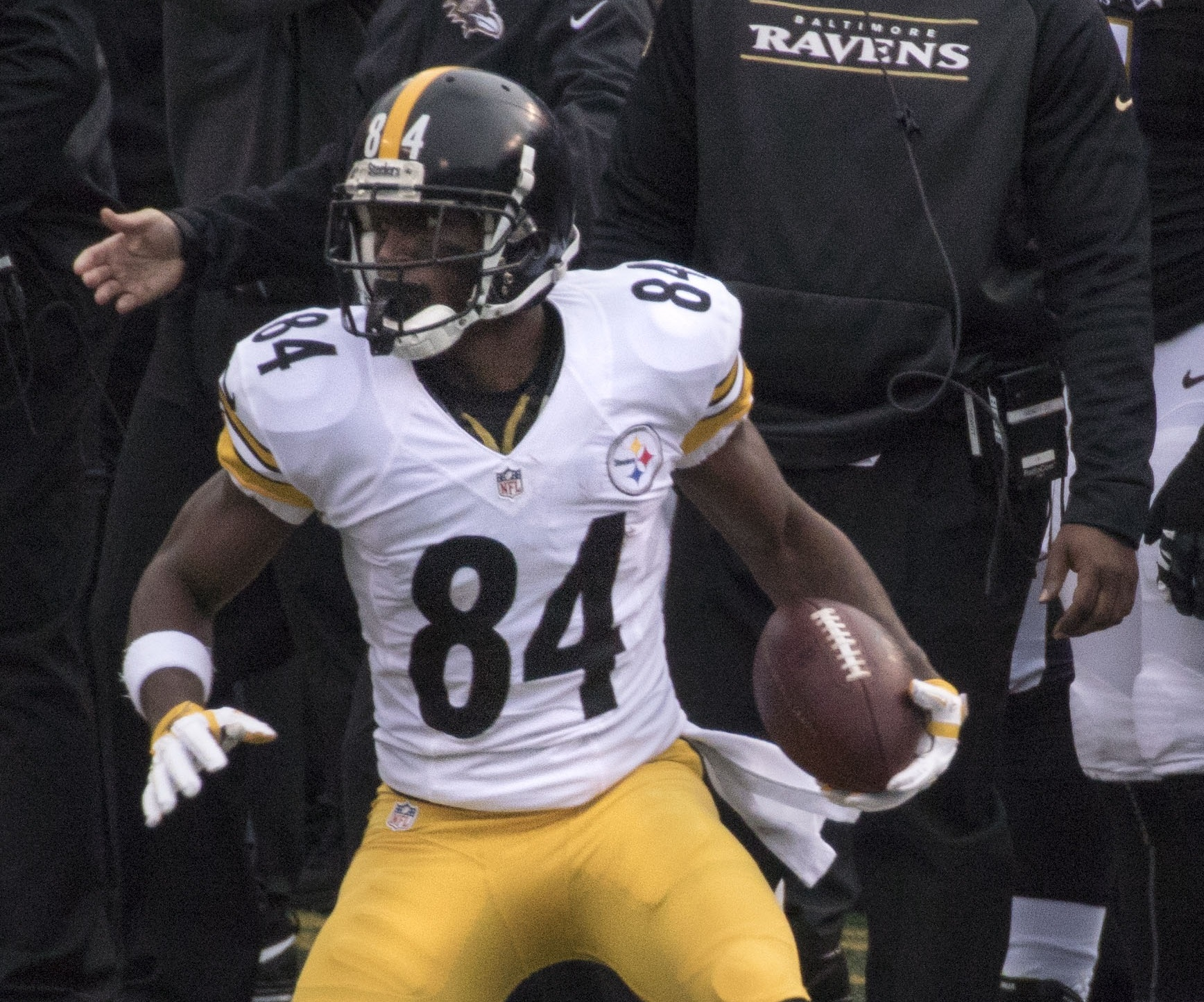
Halfback Le'Veon Bell (top) and receiver/kick returner Antonio Brown (bottom) combined with Ben Roethlisberger to form the "Killer B's" core of offensive players that dominated the league for a few years.

The Steelers began the 2013 season with an 0–4 start, their worst since 1968, but saw the emergence of rookie running back Le'Veon Bell, who broke the franchise record for most scrimmage yards by a rookie set by Franco Harris. Bell, along with receiver Antonio Brown and quarterback Ben Roethlisberger, formed the "Killer B's," a trio that would dominate the AFC North for years. Despite strong seasons from Brown and Bell, the Steelers finished 8–8 and missed the playoffs for the second consecutive year, the first such occurrence since 1999–2000. In 2014, the team improved to 11–5, honored the 40th anniversary of its first Super Bowl title, and returned to the playoffs but lost in the Wild Card round to the rival Baltimore Ravens. That season, Brown and Bell earned All-Pro honors, and the Steelers became the first team in NFL history to feature a 4,500-yard passer, 1,500-yard receiver, and 1,300-yard rusher. Notable draft picks included linebacker Ryan Shazier and receiver Martavis Bryant, though Bryant was later traded due to off-field issues. Defensive coordinator Dick LeBeau resigned after the season. In 2015, Bell was suspended for the first two games due to a DUI and marijuana possession charge, while safety Troy Polamalu retired. The Steelers controversially signed quarterback Michael Vick as a backup. Finishing 10–6, the team secured a playoff berth as the final Wild Card seed, defeating the Cincinnati Bengals in a game marked by a controversial hit on Brown by linebacker Vontaze Burfict, before losing to the eventual Super Bowl champion Denver Broncos in the Divisional round.

The 2016 season saw the Steelers win the AFC North and make the playoffs for the third straight year, playing on both Thanksgiving and Christmas Day, a first since the 2011 Green Bay Packers. They defeated the Miami Dolphins and Kansas City Chiefs in the Wild Card and Divisional rounds of the playoffs respectively. Their victory over the Chiefs was particularly notable as the team scored 18 points with no touchdowns as it took six field goals from Chris Boswell to win the game 18-16. This is the first time in NFL history a team has not scored a touchdown in a postseason game and won. They then lost to the eventual Super Bowl champion New England Patriots in the AFC Championship Game. This season was also the final under the ownership of Dan Rooney, who died on April 13, 2017.

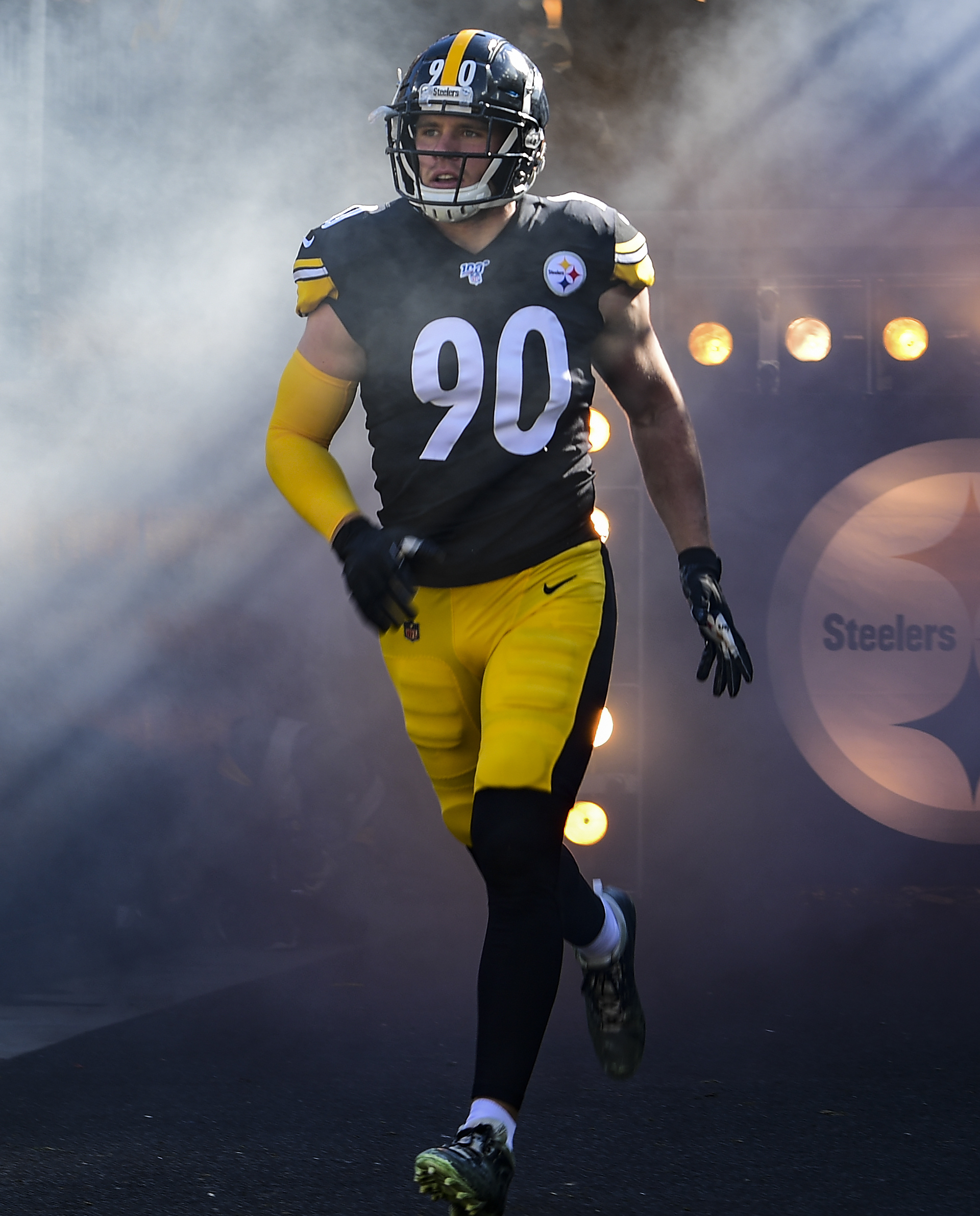
Linebacker T. J. Watt, drafted in 2017, has become a critical part of the Steelers' defense

Le'Veon Bell was slated to become a free agent, but the Steelers signed him to a franchise tag prior to the season. For Antonio Brown, however, the team signed a new five year, $68-million contract, making him the highest paid receiver in the NFL. Notable draft additions included linebacker T. J. Watt, brother of All-Pro defensive end J. J. Watt, and wideout JuJu Smith-Schuster. The Steelers finished with a dominant 13–3 record, barely missing out on the number 1 seed in the AFC due to a loss to the New England Patriots that involved a potential Steelers go-ahead touchdown getting controversially called back. Despite the hype surrounding the team, the Steelers were upset in the Divisional round of the playoffs 45–42 by the Jacksonville Jaguars, who made their first playoff appearance in ten years. After the loss to the Jaguars, Pittsburgh faced heavy criticism from the media and their fans for looking past the Jaguars and anticipating a rematch with the Patriots in the AFC Title Game.

The "Killer B's" era hit a snag beginning in the offseason when conflict arose concerning Bell and Brown. Bell, disappointed that he was franchise tagged again, refused to sign this time around and held out for what was initially supposed to be the first part of the season, but later missed out on the whole year, later signing with the New York Jets the following March. To replace him, the Steelers played second-year halfback James Conner, who filled in admirably. Brown, despite reaching career highs in both receiving yards and touchdowns, was the subject of numerous controversies both in his personal life and on the field and frequently ran into conflict with the Steelers' media and coaching staff. Brown eventually broke down prior to the week 17 game against the Cincinnati Bengals, was benched for that game and deserted the team afterward. Even Ben Roethlisberger was criticized due to his reaction to the Steelers drafting quarterback Mason Rudolph and openly criticizing teammates on his radio show during the season.

This conflict, coupled with questionable coaching decisions during the season, led to the Steelers getting widely mocked in the media, with some comparing the team to a soap opera. Despite a 7–2–1 start, the Steelers lost four of their last six games, all by less than a touchdown, and were eliminated from the postseason after the Baltimore Ravens won their week 17 game to clinch the AFC North title. Brown was later traded to the Oakland Raiders following the season, citing his inability to work with the Steelers. With the departures of both Bell and Brown, the "Killer B's" era unofficially came to an end, with some analysts noting that despite their success in the regular season, they were hampered in the postseason due to injury and bad luck.

=== 2019–2021: Roethlisberger's injury and retirement ===
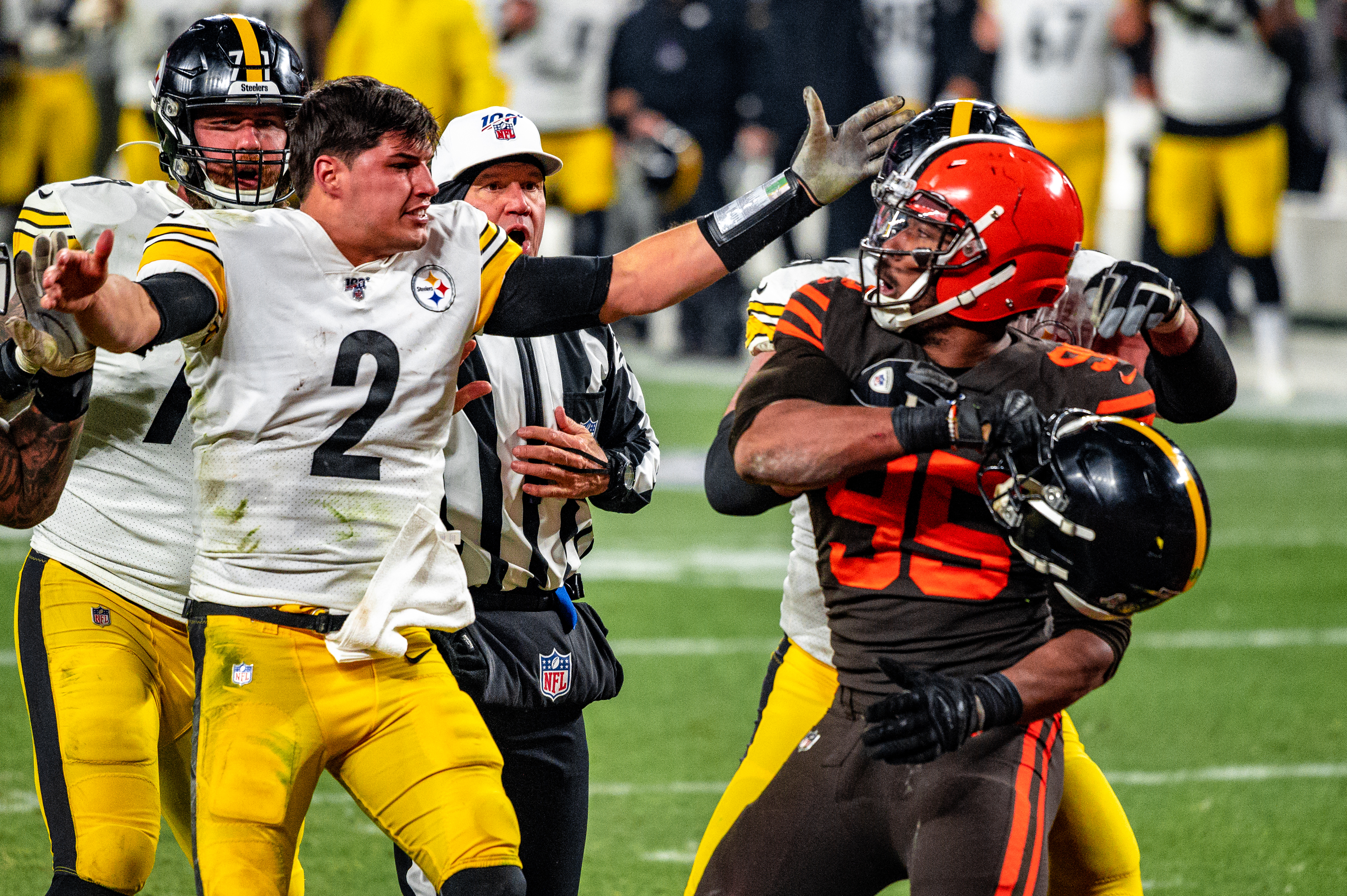
Mason Rudolph reacts after Myles Garrett hits him in the head with his own helmet

After revamping the roster to replace Bell and Brown, the Steelers suffered a 33–3 loss to the rival New England Patriots on Sunday Night Football in week 1 of the 2019 season. The following week, Ben Roethlisberger suffered a torn UCL in a 28–26 loss to the Seattle Seahawks, which would require Tommy John surgery, ending his season. He was replaced by Mason Rudolph thereafter. In Mason Rudolph's first start, the Steelers lost to the San Francisco 49ers despite causing 5 turnovers during the game. The next week, the Steelers gave a dominating performance against the Bengals. Rudolph threw for 229 yards and 2 TDs and the defense had 8 sacks and an interception. Rudolph was then injured in the following week's contest against the Baltimore Ravens after being hit by Ravens free safety Earl Thomas. Rudolph was ruled out with a concussion and Devlin Hodges replaced him for the remainder of the game. The Steelers went on to lose in overtime. Following the loss, RB Jaylen Samuels underwent Arthroscopic Knee Surgery which was rumored to hold him out for a month of the season. Devlin Hodges got his first career start in Los Angeles against the Chargers. Hodges threw for 132 yards and a touchdown during the game and the Steelers pulled out a much needed victory. During the game, the Steelers leading sacker, Stephon Tuitt, left the game with a pectoral injury. He was later ruled out for the season and placed on the IR.

Despite the slow start to the season, Pittsburgh eventually climbed to an 8–5 record by week 14 thanks to a 7–1 run after the loss to Baltimore, but lost the last three games of the season to fall to 8–8, missing the playoffs for the second consecutive season. Following a 21–7 loss to the Cleveland Browns in week 11, which featured an ugly brawl that culminated with Browns defender Myles Garrett hitting Rudolph in the head with his own helmet, Rudolph and Hodges alternated games at quarterback to moderate success. However, the offense as a whole regressed without Rothlisberger, Brown and Bell. To the contrary, Pittsburgh's defense improved substantially in 2019.

Ben Roethlisberger returned from injury to begin the season, as the Steelers began the 2020 campaign with a Monday Night Football road win over the New York Giants in Week 1, then beat the Broncos and Texans at Heinz Field in the following weeks. The offense was coming together, and the defense was stout. In Week 4, they had a surprise bye week as a result of the COVID-19 outbreak in the Tennessee Titans organization. Their match against Tennessee was moved to Week 7, forcing the Baltimore Ravens to push their bye week one week earlier for their contest with Pittsburgh in Week 8. When the Eagles came to Heinz Field in Week 5 for the first time since 2012, the Steelers hit rookie receiver Chase Claypool seven times for 110 yards and three touchdowns in the 38–29 victory, and the Steelers were 4–0 for the first time since 1979.

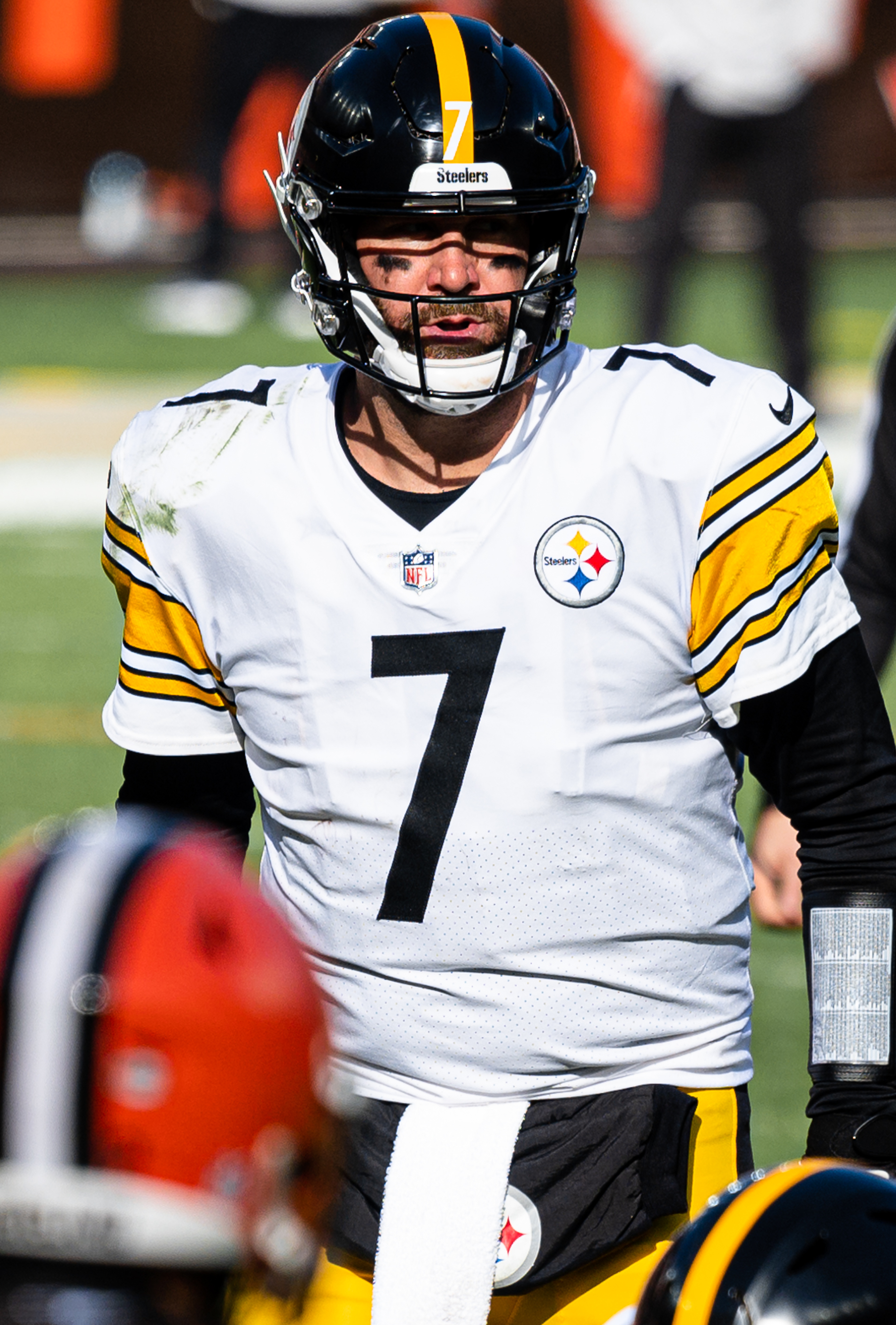
Roethlisberger during a game against the Cleveland Browns during his final season

The Steelers continued their winning streak to week 12, attaining a franchise-best 11–0 start and becoming the first team to attain that record since the 2015 Carolina Panthers. Their games included blowout wins over the Cleveland Browns and Cincinnati Bengals, shootout victories over the Baltimore Ravens and Titans, and narrow wins over struggling teams such as the Dallas Cowboys and Ravens in a rematch, in which they were missing quarterback Lamar Jackson. However, the winning streak ended when the Steelers blew a 14-point lead against the Washington Football Team to lose 23–17 in week 13. Additional losses to the Buffalo Bills and Bengals in consecutive weeks dropped Pittsburgh to 11–3. However, in Week 16, they ultimately clinched an AFC North title by overcoming a 24–7 deficit to beat the Colts, with the addition of the 1–13 Jets upsetting the Browns. After resting their starters in Week 17 against the Browns, the Steelers set up a playoff rematch with Cleveland back at Heinz Field.

After multiple COVID-19 cases within the Browns organization, which negatively impacted the majority of their coaching staff, the Steelers were the favorites to win the wild-card game. However, a botched snap on the first play of the game, as well as two costly interceptions and a stop on 3rd and 1 helped the Browns earn a surprising 28–0 lead by the end of the first quarter. Despite an NFL-record 47 completions by Roethlisberger, Cleveland's lead was insurmountable as Pittsburgh lost 48–37, giving the Browns their first win at Heinz Field since 2003 and ending a once-promising season for the Steelers.

The Steelers failed to improve on their 12–4 record from the year prior, but made the playoffs for the second consecutive season, securing the final wild card spot with a 9–7–1 record, where they would lose to the Kansas City Chiefs. After much speculation, Ben Roethlisberger retired after the season, wrapping up an 18-year career spent entirely with the Steelers. In addition to holding several Steelers franchise records, including career passing yards, touchdowns, and games started, Roethlisberger also retired as 5th all-time in passing yards, and was the last remaining active quarterback from the 2004 draft class.

=== 2022–present: Quarterback changes and playoff struggles ===
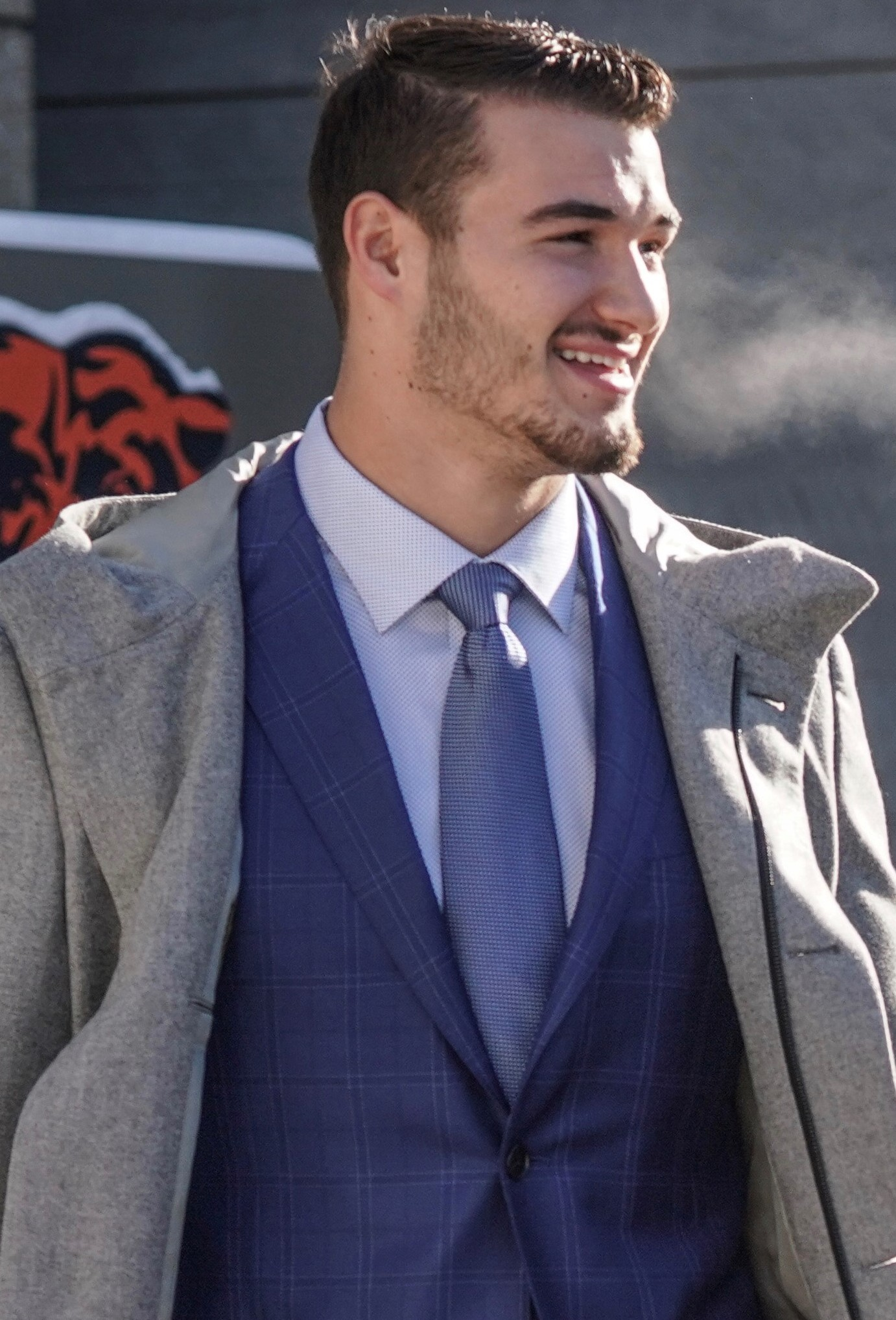
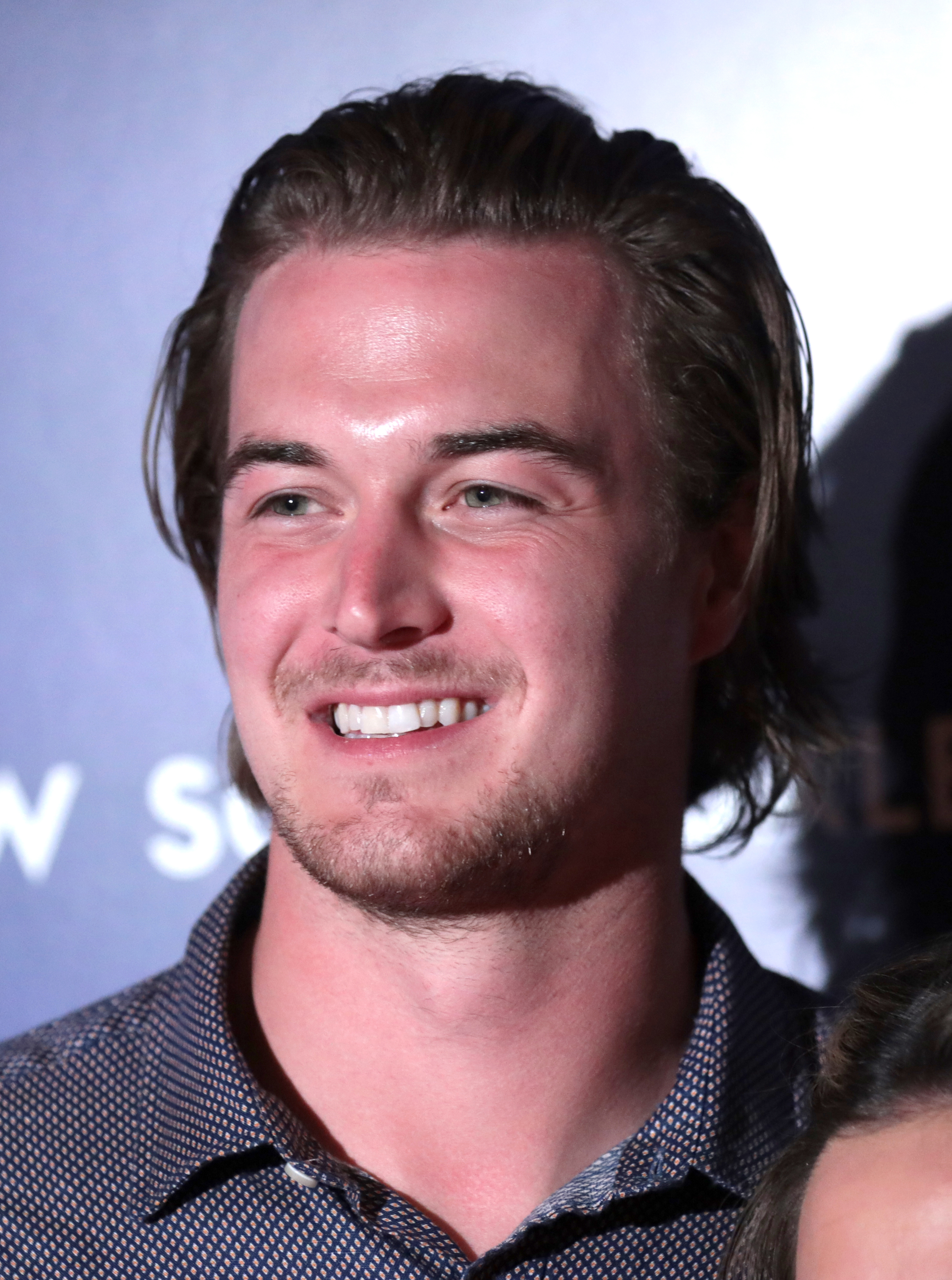
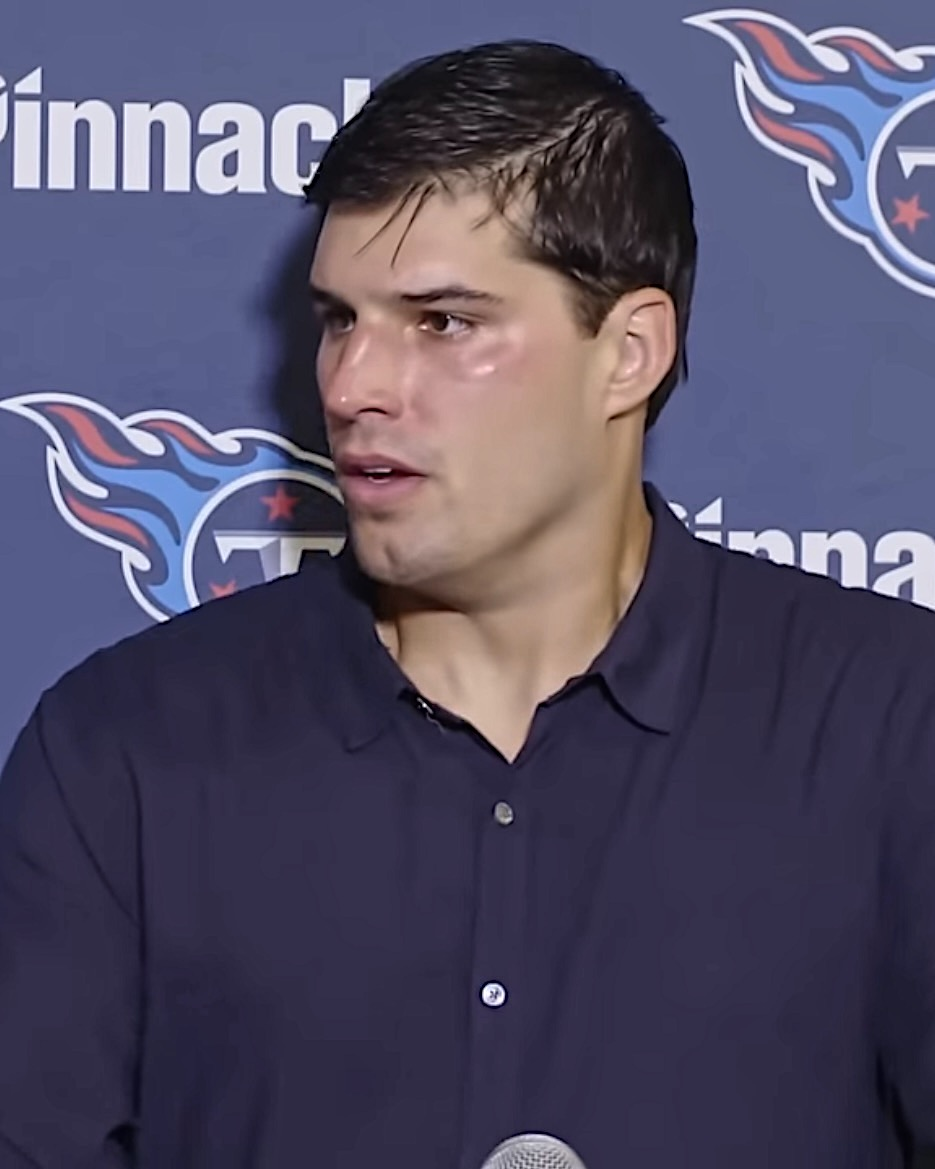
Three different quarterbacks started for the Steelers in 2022 and 2023; Mitchell Trubisky, Kenny Pickett and Mason Rudolph

In 2022, the Steelers' home field, Heinz Field, was officially renamed Acrisure Stadium.

With Roethlisberger gone, Pittsburgh signed former Chicago Bears starter Mitchell Trubisky and drafted Kenny Pickett to compete for the starting quarterback position. Trubisky won the starting position out of training camp, but Pickett took over starting in week 5. He notably formed a rapport with fellow rookie George Pickens, who led the team in receiving touchdowns that year. Despite a slow 2–6 start, the Steelers rallied late in the season to finish at 9–8, their 19th consecutive non-losing season. However, they narrowly missed the postseason, losing out on a tiebreaker to the Miami Dolphins by virtue of Miami's head-to-head win in week 7.

The Steelers improved on their 9–8 record from last season where they would later finish with a 10–7 record, good enough to finish at 3rd place in the AFC North, and after their 17–10 win over the Baltimore Ravens in Week 18 and losses by the Indianapolis Colts that same night and the Jacksonville Jaguars the next day, the Steelers would clinch a playoff spot and the #7 seed after the Buffalo Bills defeated the Miami Dolphins later that night. The Steelers season would come to an end as they lost to the Buffalo Bills 31–17.

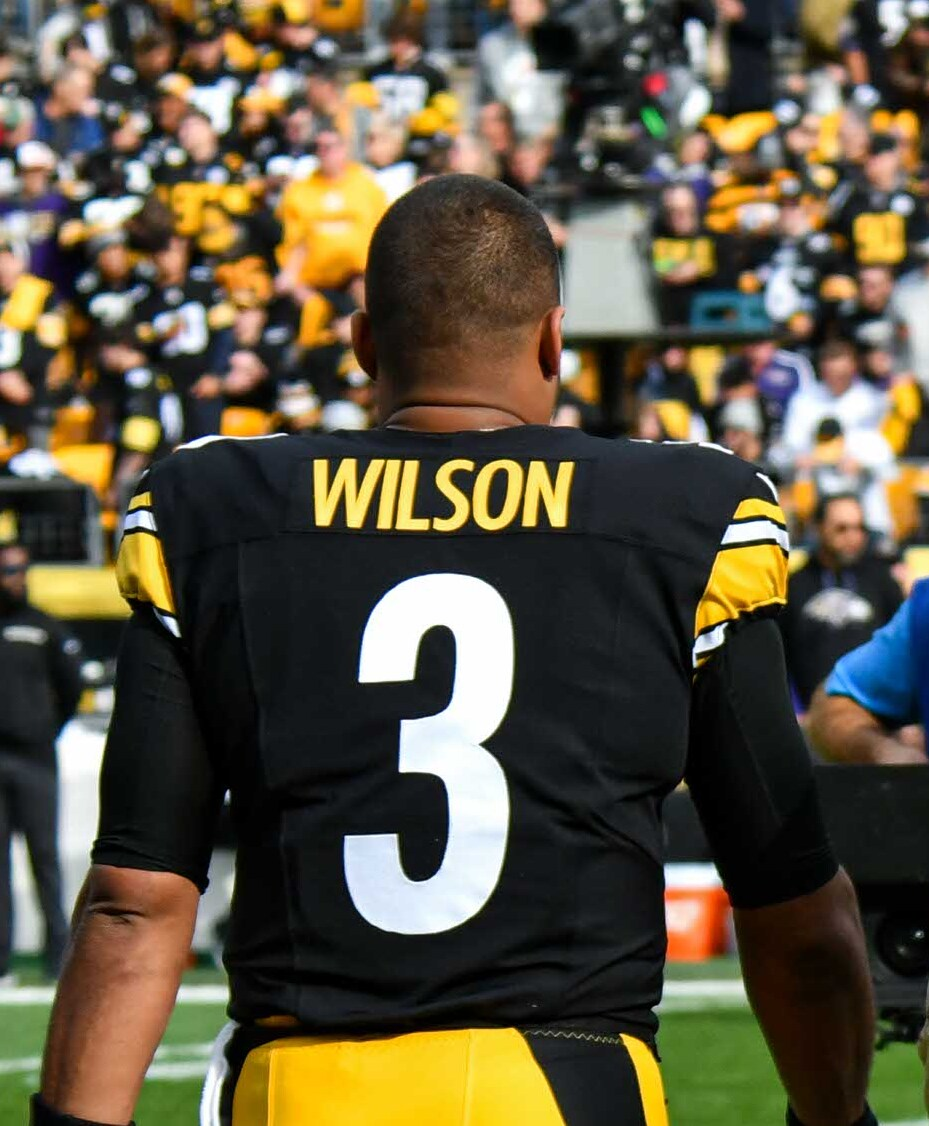
Russell Wilson played in 12 total games, including a postseason game, with the Steelers

In the 2024 offseason, third-year general manager Omar Khan honored a trade request from Pickett that sent him to the Philadelphia Eagles in exchange for a 2024 third-round pick (No. 98; Payton Wilson). Back at square one at the quarterback position, the Steelers signed free-agent Russell Wilson and also traded with the Bears to acquire Justin Fields, who was still under his rookie contract. With Fields, the Steelers posted a 4–2 record before being benched in favor of Wilson, who returned from an injury that kept him from participating in the first seven weeks of the season. After reaching their 10th win in Week 14, they matched their win total from last year. Despite losing to the Philadelphia Eagles in Week 15, the Steelers made the playoffs for the second consecutive season after losses by the Indianapolis Colts and the Miami Dolphins that same day. However, the Steelers had a late-season collapse by losing their last four games, resulting in them losing their lead in the AFC North and matching their 10–7 record from last year despite a 10–3 start. Their late-season woes continued into the playoffs where they were eliminated in the Wild Card round by the AFC North rival Baltimore Ravens 14–28, resulting in the Steelers' sixth consecutive loss in the postseason. The 2024 season was documented by HBO Max for their Hard Knocks series.

Following the 2024 season, Tomlin faced significant criticism for his lack of postseason success. Since the team's 2016 AFC championship appearance, the Steelers had yet to record a post-season victory, making Tomlin the coach with second longest playoff win drought in NFL history only behind Marvin Lewis. Calls to fire Tomlin were silenced by Steelers owner Art Rooney II who confirmed there were no plans to do so. The team declined to trade Tomlin to the Chicago Bears in January 2025.

On June 6, 2025, the Steelers added former Green Bay Packers and New York Jets quarterback Aaron Rodgers to their roster after lengthy offseason negotiations. The team also re-signed Rudolph to once again serve as the team's backup quarterback and drafted Ohio State quarterback Will Howard in the sixth round of the 2025 NFL draft. Additionally, the Steelers allowed running back Najee Harris to walk in free agency, making way for Jaylen Warren and rookie Kaleb Johnson to start in 2025. The offseason also included trading wide receiver George Pickens to the Dallas Cowboys and acquiring former Seattle Seahawks All-Pro wide receiver DK Metcalf to replace him. Pro Bowl safety Minkah Fitzpatrick was traded back to the Miami Dolphins for former Jacksonville Jaguars and Los Angeles Rams cornerback Jalen Ramsey and tight end Jonnu Smith.

By the trade deadline of the 2025 season, the Steelers had a record of 5–3 which included key wins against the eventual 14–3 New England Patriots and the 7–1 Indianapolis Colts. Before this deadline, the Steelers made trades for Marquez-Valdez Scantling, a former teammate of Rodger's in Green Bay, and Kyle Dugger, a Patriots safety. In the second half of the season, the Steelers went 0–3 against future playoff teams. In the Steelers game against the Detroit Lions, wide receiver DK Metcalf got into an altercation with a Lions fan that ended in DK throwing a punch, resulting in a two-game suspension. With a loss to the Cleveland Browns the following game and a Baltimore Ravens win against the Green Bay Packers, the Steelers who sat at a 9–7 record, faced the Ravens who sat at an 8–8 record in Week 18 to decide the AFC North champion. After a 26-yard Calvin Austin touchdown reception and a missed PAT by Chris Boswell, the Steelers took the lead 24–26 with 0:55 seconds remaining in the game. After a long reception by Isaiah Likely, Ravens rookie kicker Tyler Loop was set up for a 44 yard field goal. The kick went wide right as time expired and gave the Steeler's the AFC 4 Seed in the playoffs against the Houston Texans. This win would also secure the Steelers first AFC North title since 2020. Before the game, it was noted that the playoff game would be on a Monday night at home would significantly impact the game, as the Steelers boasted a 23-game Monday Night Football home win streak. The game would remain close until the fourth quarter, however, two defensive touchdowns by the Texans would put them ahead by 30–6. This loss would become the seventh consecutive playoff loss under Mike Tomlin.

On January 13, Mike Tomlin voluntarily stepped down as head coach for the Steelers after 19 seasons with the organization. He ended his tenure with the Steelers with 19 consecutive winning seasons, one Super Bowl win, and tied the franchise record for most wins as a head coach with 193 wins.

== 2026–present: The Mike McCarthy era ==
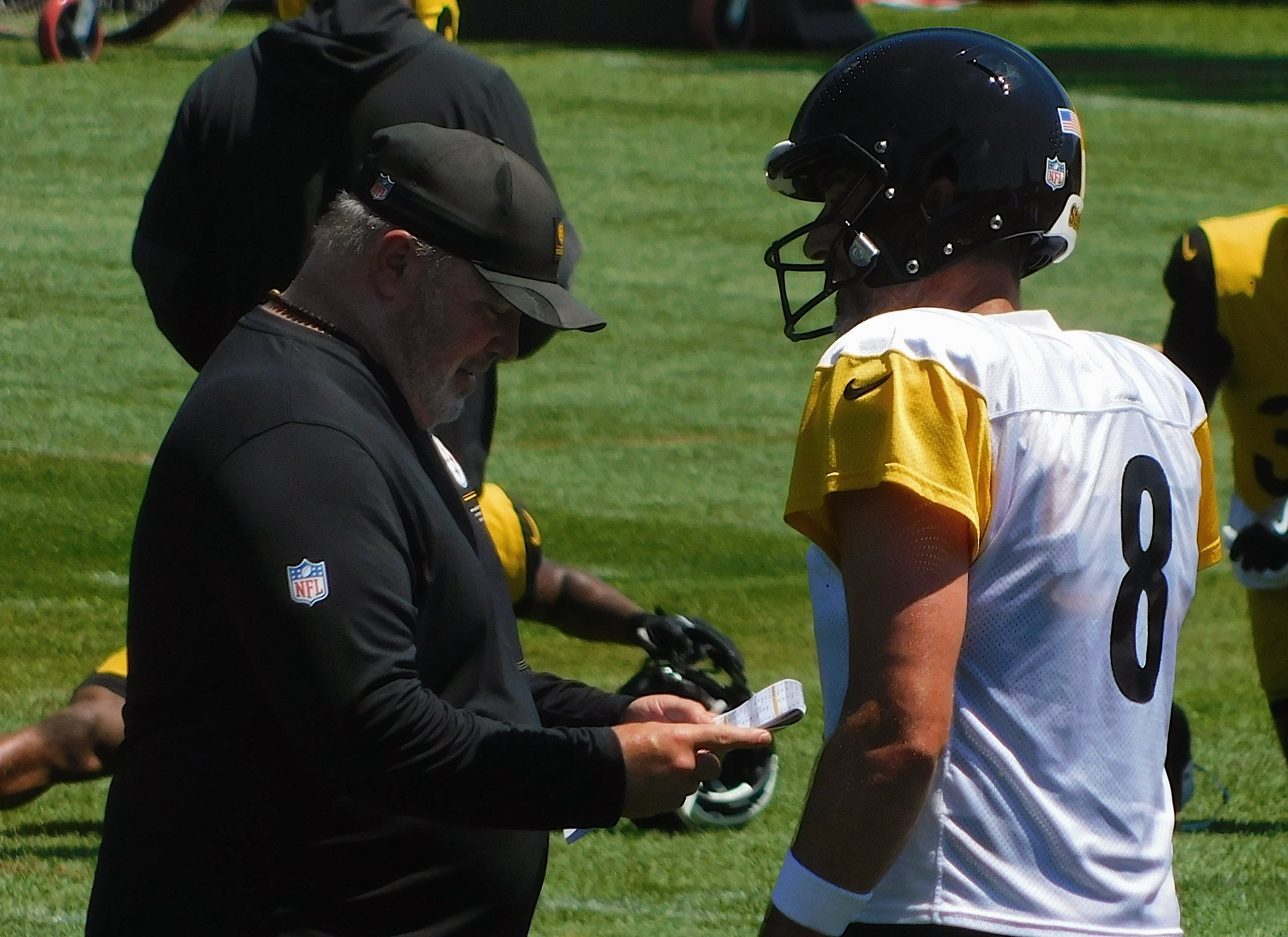
Head Coach Mike McCarthy reunited with quarterback Aaron Rodgers, with whom he previously won Super Bowl XLV with the Green Bay Packers—ironically defeating the Steelers.

On January 26, 2026, the Steelers hired veteran NFL coach Mike McCarthy as their new head coach. This marked only the fourth head coaching hire for the franchise since 1969, underscoring the organization’s longstanding stability.

== Steelers all-time record vs. AFC North ==
updated through 2025 season

Steelers record against other teams in AFC North division
vs.	Regular Season W	Regular Season L	Regular Season W-L%	Playoff W	Playoff L	Playoff W-L%	Combined W	Combined L	Combined W-L%
Baltimore Ravens	35	25	.583	3	2	.600	38	27	.585
Cincinnati Bengals	70	41	.631	2	0	1.000	72	40	.643
Cleveland Browns	81	64	.558	2	1	.667	83	65	.561

== Steelers rivalries ==
Pittsburgh's division rivals are the Cleveland Browns, Baltimore Ravens, and Cincinnati Bengals. At current, Pittsburgh has a winning record against all three. Many Pittsburgh natives and fans also consider the New England Patriots, Dallas Cowboys, Las Vegas Raiders, and Denver Broncos to be the team's primary rivals.

Pittsburgh and Cleveland have been in the same division and have met at least twice a year since 1950 (in years that the Brown franchise has been active). The Steelers hold a 2–1 post season record against the Browns. The Browns handed the Steelers the worst defeat in their history, 51–0 in Week 1 in 1989.

The Raiders were frequent opponents of the Steelers during the 1970s playoffs, with Pittsburgh facing the Raiders five consecutive times in the playoffs (1972 (Steelers win), 1973 (L), 1974 (W), 1975 (W), 1976 (L)) that decade. This gave the two teams an unusual familiarity with the other despite being in separate divisions in that decade. The Raiders and Steelers have met one additional time in the playoffs (1983 (L)) for a current record of 3–3 in the postseason.

Pittsburgh and Dallas first met in 1960 in the Cowboys' first game as a franchise, with the Steelers winning 35–28. The two franchises have faced each other in the Super Bowl on three occasions (X (W), XIII (W), XXX (L)) with Pittsburgh leading the series 2–1. In the 1970s, Pittsburgh and Dallas were both renowned for stifling defenses named "The Steel Curtain" and "The Doomsday Defense" respectively. Pittsburgh became the first team to achieve three Super Bowl wins when it defeated Dallas in Super Bowl XIII, and the first team to achieve four Super Bowl victories a year later when they defeated the Rams. Dallas defeated the Steelers in Super Bowl XXX to become the second team behind San Francisco to win five Super Bowl Championships. Ten years later, Pittsburgh would join Dallas and San Francisco to become the third team to reach that milestone when they defeated the Seattle Seahawks in Super Bowl XL. Three years later, the Steelers would become the first team to win a sixth Super Bowl, achieving that milestone in the 2008–09 season. They played against the Arizona Cardinals in Super Bowl XLIII, with a 27–23 comeback victory.

The Broncos have competed in eight playoff games against the Steelers, the most of any team against the Steelers. With the most recent meeting in the playoffs for the 2015 season, the record is 3–5 in favor of Denver.

The rivalry with the New England Patriots is more recent. The two clubs met thirteen times 1972–95 with the Steelers winning ten, including five in a row. But in the 1996 season the two met in the playoffs for the first time and the rivalry changed, as the Patriots defeated the Steelers 28–3 in the AFC Divisional Playoffs in January 1997. The next year the Steelers edged New England in overtime 24–21 and won in the divisional round 7–6. Since then, however, the Patriots have won ten of fourteen regular-season meetings and three AFC Championship Game matchups, two in Pittsburgh's home field at Heinz Field. In the 2004 season, Pittsburgh ended New England's 21-game winning streak with a score of 34–20, part of Pittsburgh's journey to a 15–1 regular season, but in the AFC Championship Game the Steelers were defeated 41–27 by the Patriots. In the 2017 season, the Steelers-Patriots game ended in controversial fashion, as an apparent touchdown and go-ahead score for Pittsburgh with 28 seconds left was overturned due to the definition of a catch while the receiver is going to the ground. For the 2018 season, the NFL revised the definition of a catch.

Steelers regular season record against non-division historical rivals
vs.	Regular Season W	Regular Season L	Regular Season T	Regular Season W-L%	Playoff W	Playoff L	Playoff W-L%	Combined W	Combined L	Combined T	Combined W-L%
Dallas Cowboys	14	17	—	.452	2	1	.667	16	18	—	.471
Denver Broncos	11	15	1	.426	3	5	.375	14	20	1	.412
Las Vegas Raiders	13	14	—	.481	3	3	.500	16	17	—	.485
New England Patriots	16	15	—	.516	1	4	.200	17	19	—	.472

updated through 2025 regular season
