= 1933 Pittsburgh Pirates (NFL) season =

Inaugural season of NFL team Pittsburgh Steelers

1933 Pittsburgh Pirates season
- Owner: Art Rooney
- Head coach: Forrest Douds
- Home stadium: Forbes Field

Results
- Record: 3–6–2
- Division place: 5th Eastern Division
- Playoffs: Did not qualify

Pittsburgh Pirates 1933 team photo

The 1933 Pittsburgh Pirates season marked the debut of the team known today as the Pittsburgh Steelers. The team was established by Arthur Rooney Sr., a former boxer and semi-pro football player, who paid the National Football League (NFL) its $2,500 expansion fee with winnings from successful weekend gambling at the Saratoga Race Track in New York.

Rooney named the team "Pirates." Home games were scheduled for Forbes Field, stadium used by the baseball Pirates. The new squad was composed largely of local semi-pro players.

Rooney quickly ran into Pennsylvania's blue laws, which prohibited professional sports from taking place on Sundays, when most NFL games took place. Rooney slyly circumvented the law by providing the superintendent of police with free box seats.

Except for a brief period in 1940 and 1941, Rooney would remain the franchise's principal owner until his death in 1988. The Rooney family has retained a controlling interest ever since.

The Pirates took the field for the first time on September 20 against the New York Giants at Forbes Field, losing 23–2. The following week, the team got its first win, defeating the Chicago Cardinals at home 14–13.

The team finished 3–6–2 for the season.

== Regular season ==
=== Schedule ===
Game	Date	Opponent	Result	Record	Venue	Attendance	Recap	Sources
—	September 13	Cincinnati Reds	**Postponed due to rain**					
1	September 20	**New York Giants**	**L** 2–23	0–1	Forbes Field	20,000	Recap	
2	September 27	Chicago Cardinals	**W** 14–13	1–1	Forbes Field	5,000	Recap	
3	October 4	**Boston Redskins**	**L** 6–21	1–2	Forbes Field	15,000	Recap	
4	October 11	Cincinnati Reds	**W** 17–3	2–2	Forbes Field	5,000	Recap	
5	October 15	at Green Bay Packers	**L** 0–47	2–3	City Stadium	4,000	Recap	
6	October 22	at Cincinnati Reds	**T** 0–0	2–3–1	Redland Field	900	Recap	
7	October 29	at **Boston Redskins**	**W** 16–14	3–3–1	Fenway Park	7,500	Recap	
8	November 5	at **Brooklyn Dodgers**	**T** 3–3	3–3–2	Ebbets Field	15,000	Recap	
9	November 12	**Brooklyn Dodgers**	**L** 0–32	3–4–2	Forbes Field	12,000	Recap	
10	November 19	at **Philadelphia Eagles**	**L** 6–25	3–5–2	Baker Bowl	6,000	Recap	
—	Bye							
11	December 3	at **New York Giants**	**L** 3-27	3–6–2	Polo Grounds	10,000	Recap	
Note: Intra-division opponents are in **bold** text.

== Roster ==
1933 Pittsburgh Pirates final roster
Backs: 29 Angelo Brovelli RB/CB/S/K; 27 James Clark RB/CB; 36 Tony Holm FB/LB; 38 Walt Holmer RB/CB/S; 37 Mose Kelsch FB/LB/K; 39 Elmer Schwartz FB/LB; 21 Harp Vaughan RB/CB/S; Ends/Receivers: 22 Ted Dailey; 30 Paul Moss; 20 Bill Sortet; 40 Ray Tesser	Linemen: 44 Corrie Artman T/DT; 34 Larry Critchfield G/DG; 28 Nick DeCarbo G/DG; 46 Forrest Douds T/DT; 35 Clarence Janecek G/DG; 45 Ray Kemp T/DT; 32 Mose Lantz C/MG; 33 Cap Oehler C/MG; 48 Jess Quatse T/DT; 43 Don Rhodes T/DT; Rookies in italics

== Standings ==
NFL Eastern Division
	W	L	T	PCT	DIV	PF	PA	STK
New York Giants	11	3	0	.786	7–1	244	101	W7
Brooklyn Dodgers	5	4	1	.556	2–2–1	93	54	L2
Boston Redskins	5	5	2	.500	2–3	103	97	T1
Philadelphia Eagles	3	5	1	.375	1–2	77	158	L2
Pittsburgh Pirates	3	6	2	.333	1–5–1	67	208	L3

Note: Tie games were not officially counted in the standings until 1972.

== Game summaries ==
=== Week 1 (Wednesday September 20, 1933): New York Giants ===
	1	2	3	4	Total
Giants	0	7	0	16	23
Pirates	0	0	0	2	2

at Forbes Field, Pittsburgh, Pennsylvania

- Game time:
- Game weather:
- Game attendance: 20,000
- Referee:
- TV announcers:

Scoring drives:

- New York – Strong 33 interception (Strong kick)
- Pittsburgh – Safety, Strong punt blocked out of end zone by Oehler
- New York – Newman 5 run (Strong kick)
- New York – FG Newman 39
- New York – Burnett 37 pass from Newman (kick failed)

=== Week 2 (Wednesday September 27, 1933): Chicago Cardinals ===
	1	2	3	4	Total
Cardinals	6	7	0	0	13
Pirates	0	7	0	7	14

at Forbes Field, Pittsburgh, Pennsylvania

- Game time:
- Game weather:
- Game attendance: 5,000
- Referee:
- TV announcers:

Scoring drives:

- Chicago Cardinals – McNally 51 intercepted lateral (kick failed)
- Chicago Cardinals – Moe 35 pass from Lillard (Lillard kick)
- Pittsburgh – Kottler 99 interception (Kelsch kick)
- Pittsburgh – Moss 11 pass from Tanguay (Kelsch kick)

=== Week 3 (Wednesday October 4, 1933): Boston Redskins ===
	1	2	3	4	Total
Redskins	7	0	7	7	21
Pirates	0	0	0	6	6

at Forbes Field, Pittsburgh, Pennsylvania

- Game time:
- Game weather:
- Game attendance: 15,000
- Referee:
- TV announcers:

Scoring drives:

- Boston – Battles 70 punt return (Musick kick)
- Boston – Musick 1 run (Musick kick)
- Boston – Holmer 1 run (LaPresta kick)
- Pittsburgh – Brovelli 1 run (kick failed)

=== Week 4 (Wednesday October 11, 1933): Cincinnati Reds ===
	1	2	3	4	Total
Reds	3	0	0	0	3
Pirates	7	0	0	10	17

at Forbes Field, Pittsburgh, Pennsylvania

- Game time:
- Game weather:
- Game attendance: 5,000
- Referee:
- TV announcers:

Scoring drives:

- Cincinnati – FG Clark 12
- Pittsburgh – Westfall 2 run (Brovelli kick)
- Pittsburgh – FG Kelsch 36
- Pittsburgh – Vaughan 3 run (Westfall kick)

=== Week 5 (Sunday October 15, 1933): at Green Bay Packers ===
	1	2	3	4	Total
Pirates	0	0	0	0	0
Packers	7	20	13	7	47

at City Stadium, Green Bay, Wisconsin

- Game time:
- Game weather:
- Game attendance: 4,000
- Referee:
- TV announcers:

Scoring drives:

- Green Bay – Hinkle 1 run (Monnett kick)
- Green Bay – Monnett 7 run (kick failed)
- Green Bay – Goldenberg 67 interception (Grove kick)
- Green Bay – Goldenberg 3 run (Monnett kick)
- Green Bay – Bruder 52 run (Herber kick)
- Green Bay – Monnett 12 run (kick failed)
- Green Bay – Englemann 40 lateral from Monnett after 9 pass from Herber (Monnett kick)

=== Week 6 (Sunday October 22, 1933): at Cincinnati Reds ===
	1	2	3	4	Total
Pirates	0	0	0	0	0
Reds	0	0	0	0	0

at Redland Field, Cincinnati, Ohio

- Game time:
- Game weather:
- Game attendance: 900
- Referee:
- TV announcers:

Scoring drives:

- none

=== Week 7 (Sunday October 29, 1933): at Boston Redskins ===
	1	2	3	4	Total
Pirates	0	9	7	0	16
Redskins	7	0	0	7	14

at Fenway Park, Boston, Massachusetts

- Game time:
- Game weather:
- Game attendance: 7,500
- Referee:
- TV announcers:

Scoring drives:

- Boston – Battles 5 run (Musick kick)
- Pittsburgh – Moss 30 pass from Holm (kick failed)
- Pittsburgh – FG Engebretsen 21
- Pittsburgh – Westfall 60 pass from Holm (Brovelli kick)
- Boston – Weller run (Musick kick)

=== Week 8 (Sunday November 5, 1933): at Brooklyn Dodgers ===
	1	2	3	4	Total
Pirates	0	0	0	3	3
Dodgers	3	0	0	0	3

at Ebbets Field, Brooklyn, New York

- Game time:
- Game weather:
- Game attendance: 15,000
- Referee:
- TV announcers:

Scoring drives:

- Brooklyn – FG Hickman 30
- Pittsburgh – FG Kelsch 15

=== Week 9 (Sunday November 12, 1933): Brooklyn Dodgers ===
	1	2	3	4	Total
Dodgers	6	7	13	6	32
Pirates	0	0	0	0	0

at Forbes Field, Pittsburgh, Pennsylvania

- Game time:
- Game weather:
- Game attendance: 12,000
- Referee:
- TV announcers:

Scoring drives:

- Brooklyn – Kelly 15 run (kick failed)
- Brooklyn – Kelly 70 punt return (Hickman kick)
- Brooklyn – Nash 61 pass from Cagle (kick failed)
- Brooklyn – Kelly 2 run (Kelly kick)
- Brooklyn – Fishel 7 run (kick failed)

=== Week 10 (Sunday November 19, 1933): at Philadelphia Eagles ===
	1	2	3	4	Total
Pirates	0	0	0	6	6
Eagles	6	0	13	6	25

at Baker Bowl, Philadelphia, Pennsylvania

- Game time:
- Game weather:
- Game attendance: 6,000
- Referee:
- TV announcers:

Scoring drives:

- Philadelphia – Hanson run (kick failed)
- Philadelphia – Carter pass from Kirkman (Kirkman kick)
- Philadelphia – Carter pass from Kirkman (kick failed)
- Pittsburgh – Brovelli run (kick failed)
- Philadelphia – Woodruff run (kick failed)

=== Week 12 (Sunday December 3, 1933): at New York Giants ===
	1	2	3	4	Total
Pirates	0	3	0	0	3
Giants	0	0	7	20	27

at Polo Grounds, New York City

- Game time:
- Game weather:
- Game attendance: 10,000
- Referee:
- TV announcers:

Scoring drives:

- Pittsburgh – FG Kelsch 14
- New York – Krause 20 pass from Strong (Strong kick)
- New York – Badgro 25 pass from Newman (kick failed)
- New York – Richards 14 pass from Newman (Richards kick)
- New York – Richards 22 run (Krause pass from Newman)
