= 1933 New York Giants season =

NFL team season

- Head coach: Steve Owen
- Home stadium: Polo Grounds

Results
- Record: 11–3
- Division place: 1st NFL Eastern
- Playoffs: Lost NFL Championship (at Bears) 21–23

The 1933 New York Giants season was the franchise's 9th season in the National Football League.

== Schedule ==
=== Regular season ===
Week	Date	Opponent	Result	Record	Venue	Sources
1	September 20	at **Pittsburgh Pirates**	**W** 23–2	1–0	Forbes Field	
2	September 24	at Portsmouth Spartans	**L** 7–17	1–1	Universal Stadium	
3	October 1	at Green Bay Packers	**W** 10–7	2–1	Borchert Field	
4	October 8	at **Boston Redskins**	**L** 20–21	2–2	Fenway Park	
5	October 15	**Philadelphia Eagles**	**W** 56–0	3–2	Polo Grounds	
6	October 22	**Brooklyn Dodgers**	**W** 21–7	4–2	Polo Grounds	
7	October 29	at Chicago Bears	**L** 10–14	4–3	Wrigley Field	
8	November 5	Portsmouth Spartans	**W** 13–10	5–3	Polo Grounds	
9	November 12	**Boston Redskins**	**W** 7–0	6–3	Polo Grounds	
10	November 19	Chicago Bears	**W** 3–0	7–3	Polo Grounds	
11	November 26	Green Bay Packers	**W** 17–6	8–3	Polo Grounds	
12	November 30	at **Brooklyn Dodgers**	**W** 10–0	9–3	Ebbets Field	
13	December 3	**Pittsburgh Pirates**	**W** 27–3	10–3	Polo Grounds	
13	December 10	**at Philadelphia Eagles**	**W** 20–14	11–3	Baker Bowl	
Note: Intra-division opponents are in **bold** text.

=== Postseason ===
Round	Date	Opponent	Result	Venue	Sources
Championship	December 17	at Chicago Bears	**L** 21–23	Wrigley Field	

== Game summaries ==
=== Week 1: at Pittsburgh Pirates ===
Week One: New York Giants at Pittsburgh Pirates – Game summary

Quarter	1	2	3	4	Total
Giants	0	7	0	16	23
Pirates	0	0	0	2	2

at Forbes Field, Pittsburgh, Pennsylvania

- Date: September 20
- Game time: Night
- Game attendance: 20,000

Game information

Second quarter

- NYG Ken Strong 33-yard interception return (Strong kick)

Fourth quarter

- PIT Safety, Cap Oehler blocked Strong punt out of end zone
- NYG Harry Newman 5-yard run (Strong kick)
- NYG Newman 39-yard FG
- NYG Dale Burnett 37-yard pass from Newman (kick failed)

=== Week 2: at Portsmouth Spartans ===
Week Two: New York Giants at Portsmouth Spartans – Game summary

Quarter	1	2	3	4	Total
Giants	0	0	0	7	7
Spartans	0	7	10	0	17

at Universal Stadium, Portsmouth, Ohio

- Date: October 22
- Game attendance: 7,000

Game information

Second quarter

- POR Ace Gutowsky 1-yard run (Glenn Presnell kick)

Third quarter

- POR Presnell 55-yard run (Presnell kick)
- POR Presnell 25-yard FG

Fourth quarter

- NYG Red Badgro 20-yard fumble return (Strong kick)

=== Week 3: at Green Bay Packers ===
Week Three: New York Giants at Green Bay Packers – Game summary

Quarter	1	2	3	4	Total
Giants	3	7	0	0	10
Packers	0	0	0	7	7

at Borchert Field, Milwaukee, Wisconsin

- Date: October 1
- Game attendance: 12,467

Game information

First quarter

- NYG Strong 39-yard FG

Second quarter

- NYG Burnett 19-yard pass from Newman (Newman kick)

Fourth quarter

- GB Johnny Blood 30-yard pass from Bob Monnett (Monnett kick)

=== Week 4: at Boston Redskins ===
Week Four: New York Giants at Boston Redskins – Game summary

Quarter	1	2	3	4	Total
Giants	7	0	6	7	20
Redskins	0	14	7	0	21

at Fenway Park, Boston, Massachusetts

- Date: October 8
- Game attendance: 15,000

Game information

First quarter

- NYG Bo Molenda 10-yard run (Newman kick)

Second quarter

- BOS Jim Musick 20-yard run (Musick kick)
- BOS Louis Weller 50-yard run (Musick kick)

Third quarter

- BOS Cliff Battles run (Musick kick)
- NYG Stu Clancy 15-yard run (kick blocked)

Fourth quarter

- NYG Newman 80-yard run (Newman kick)

=== Week 5: vs. Philadelphia Eagles ===
Week Five: Philadelphia Eagles at New York Giants – Game summary

Quarter	1	2	3	4	Total
Eagles	0	0	0	0	0
Giants	21	7	7	21	56

at Polo Grounds, New York, New York

- Date: October 15
- Game attendance: 18,000

Game information

First quarter

- NYG Hap Moran 70-yard pass from Newman (Newman-Moran pass)
- NYG Molenda run (Jack McBride kick)
- NYG Strong 5-yard run (Strong kick)

Second quarter

- NYG Clancy 46-yard run (McBride kick)

Third quarter

- NYG Molenda 2-yard run (McBride kick)

Fourth quarter

- NYG Kink Richards run (McBride kick)
- NYG Richards 26 pass from McBride (Strong kick)
- NYG Burnett 23 pass from McBride (Newman kick)

=== Week 6: vs. Brooklyn Dodgers ===
Week Six: Brooklyn Dodgers at New York Giants – Game summary

Quarter	1	2	3	4	Total
Dodgers	0	0	0	7	7
Giants	7	7	7	0	21

at Polo Grounds, New York, New York

- Date: October 22
- Game attendance: 35,000

Game information

First quarter

- NYG Newman 17-yard run (Strong kick)

Second quarter

- NYG Glenn Campbell 17-yard pass from Newman (Strong kick)

Third quarter

- NYG Richards 70-yard run (McBride kick)

Fourth quarter

- BRK Paul Riblett 14-yard pass from Benny Friedman (Friedman kick)

=== Week 7: at Chicago Bears ===
Week Seven: New York Giants at Chicago Bears – Game summary

Quarter	1	2	3	4	Total
Giants	7	0	0	3	10
Bears	0	7	0	7	14

at Wrigley Field, Chicago, Illinois

- Date: October 29
- Game attendance: 28,000

Game information

First quarter

- NYG Strong 41-yard pass from Newman (Strong kick)

Second quarter

- CHB Bill Hewitt 29-yard pass from Keith Molesworth (Jack Manders kick)

Fourth quarter

- NYG Strong 26-yard FG
- CHB Bill Karr 11-yard pass from Molesworth (Manders kick)

=== Week 8: vs. Portsmouth Spartans ===
Week Eight: Portsmouth Spartans at New York Giants – Game summary

Quarter	1	2	3	4	Total
Spartans	3	7	0	0	10
Giants	0	0	0	13	13

at Polo Grounds, New York, New York

- Date: November 5
- Game attendance: 35,000

Game information

First quarter

- POR Presnell 20-yard FG

Second quarter

- POR Presnell 81-yard run (Presnell kick)

Fourth quarter

- NYG Strong 12-yard pass from Newman (kick failed)
- NYG Strong 2-yard run (Strong kick)

=== Week 9: vs. Boston Redskins ===
Week Six: Boston Redskins at New York Giants – Game summary

Quarter	1	2	3	4	Total
Redskins	0	0	0	0	0
Giants	0	7	0	0	7

at Polo Grounds, New York, New York

- Date: November 12
- Game attendance: 17,601

Game information

Second quarter

- NYG Tex Irvin 15-yard pass from Newman (Strong kick)

=== Week 10: vs. Chicago Bears ===
Week Ten: Chicago Bears at New York Giants – Game summary

Quarter	1	2	3	4	Total
Bears	0	0	0	0	0
Giants	0	3	0	0	3

at Polo Grounds, New York, New York

- Date: November 19
- Game attendance: 22,000

Game information

Second quarter

- NYG Strong 21-yard FG

=== Week 11: vs. Green Bay Packers ===
Week Eleven: Green Bay Packers at New York Giants – Game summary

Quarter	1	2	3	4	Total
Packers	0	0	0	6	6
Giants	7	0	10	0	17

at Polo Grounds, New York, New York

- Date: November 26
- Game attendance: 35,000

Game information

First quarter

- NYG Burnett 84-yard interception return (Strong kick)

Third quarter

- NYG Badgro 35-yard pass from Newman (Strong kick)
- NYG Strong 30-yard FG

Fourth quarter

- GB Milt Gantenbein 24-yard pass from Arnie Herber (kick failed)

=== Week 12 (Game 1): at Brooklyn Dodgers ===
Week Twelve, Game 1: New York Giants at Brooklyn Dodgers – Game summary

Quarter	1	2	3	4	Total
Giants	0	0	3	7	10
Dodgers	0	0	0	0	0

at Ebbets Field, Brooklyn, New York

- Date: November 30
- Game attendance: 28,000

Game information

Third quarter

- NYG Strong 16-yard FG

Fourth quarter

- NYG Clancy 1-yard run (McBride kick)

=== Week 12 (Game 2): vs. Pittsburgh Pirates ===
Week Twelve, Game 2: Pittsburgh Pirates at New York Giants – Game summary

Quarter	1	2	3	4	Total
Pirates	0	3	0	0	3
Giants	0	0	7	20	27

at Polo Grounds, New York, New York

- Date: December 3
- Game attendance: 10,000

Game information

Second quarter

- PIT Mose Kelsch 14-yard FG

Third quarter

- NYG Max Krause 20-yard pass from Strong (Strong kick)

Fourth quarter

- NYG Badgro 25-yard pass from Newman (kick failed)
- NYG Richards 14-yard pass from Newman (Richards kick)
- NYG Richards 22-yard run (Newman-Krause pass)

=== Week 13: at Philadelphia Eagles ===
Week Thirteen: New York Giants at Philadelphia Eagles – Game summary

Quarter	1	2	3	4	Total
Giants	0	7	6	7	20
Eagles	0	0	7	7	14

at Baker Bowl, Philadelphia, Pennsylvania

- Date: December 10
- Game attendance: 35,000

Game information

Second quarter

- NYG Newman pass from Strong (Newman kick)

Third quarter

- PHI Red Kirkman 54-yard pass from Red Davis (Davis kick)
- NYG Richards run (kick failed)

Fourth quarter

- PHI Swede Hanson 61-yard run (Davis kick)
- NYG Richards 60-yard pass from Newman (Newman kick)

== 1933 NFL Championship Game ==
1933 NFL Championship: New York Giants at Chicago Bears

Quarter	1	2	3	4	Total
Giants	0	7	7	7	21
Bears	3	3	10	7	23

at Wrigley Field, Chicago, Illinois

- Date: December 17
- Game attendance: 26,000

Game information

First quarter

- CHB Jack Manders 16-yard FG

Second quarter

- CHB Manders 40-yard FG
- NYG Red Badgro 29-yard pass from Harry Newman (Ken Strong kick)

Third quarter

- CHB Manders 28-yard FG
- NYG Max Krause 1-yard run (Strong kick)
- CHB Bill Karr 8-yard pass from Bronko Nagurski (Manders kick)

Fourth quarter

- NYG Strong 8-yard pass from Newman (Strong kick)
- CHB Karr 19 yard lateral from Bill Hewitt after 14-yard pass from Nagurski (Carl Brumbaugh kick)

== Roster ==
1933 New York Giants final roster
Backs: 18 Dale Burnett RB/CB; 4 Stu Clancy RB/CB/S; 25 Max Krause FB/LB; 20 Jack McBride RB/CB; 23 Bo Molenda FB/LB; 22 Hap Moran RB/CB; 12 Harry Newman RB/S/K; 13 Kink Richards RB/CB/S; 50 Ken Strong RB/CB/K	Linemen: 9 John Cannella G/DG; 11 Butch Gibson G/DG; 3 Len Grant T/DT; 7 Mel Hein C/MG; 29 Tex Irvin T/G/DT; 10 Potsy Jones G/DG; 27 Bill Morgan T/DT; 36 Bill Owen T/DT; 55 Hank Reese C/G/MG; 33 Ollie Satenstein G/C/DG	Ends/Receivers: 17 Red Badgro; 15 Glenn Campbell; 1 Ray Flaherty; Reserve: 8 Tiny Feather E; rookies in italics

== Standings ==
NFL Eastern Division
	W	L	T	PCT	DIV	PF	PA	STK
New York Giants	11	3	0	.786	7–1	244	101	W7
Brooklyn Dodgers	5	4	1	.556	2–2–1	93	54	L2
Boston Redskins	5	5	2	.500	2–3	103	97	T1
Philadelphia Eagles	3	5	1	.375	1–2	77	158	L2
Pittsburgh Pirates	3	6	2	.333	1–5–1	67	208	L3

Note: Tie games were not officially counted in the standings until 1972.

== See also ==
- List of New York Giants seasons
