= 1933 Chicago Cardinals season =

American football team season

- Owner: Charles Bidwill
- Head coach: Paul Schissler
- Home stadium: Wrigley Field

Results
- Record: 1–9–1
- Division place: 5th NFL Western
- Playoffs: Did not qualify

The 1933 Chicago Cardinals season was their 14th in the National Football League. The team failed to improve on their previous year's record of 2–6–2, with only one victory and the worst record in the ten-team league. They failed to qualify for the first scheduled playoff, the 1933 NFL Championship Game.

This was the first season of ownership for attorney Charles Bidwill, who bought the team from Dr. David J. Jones for $50,000. The new head coach of the team was Paul Schissler, formerly head coach at Oregon State Agricultural College for nearly a decade.

== Schedule ==
Game	Date	Opponent	Result	Record	Venue	Attendance	Recap	Sources
1	September 27	at Pittsburgh Pirates	**L** 13–14	0–1	Forbes Field	5,000	Recap	
2	October 1	at **Portsmouth Spartans**	**L** 6–7	0–2	Spartan Stadium		Recap	
3	October 8	at **Cincinnati Reds**	**W** 3–0	1–2	Redland Field	1,500	Recap	
4	October 15	at **Chicago Bears**	**L** 9–12	1–3	Wrigley Field	12,000	Recap	
5	October 22	at Boston Redskins	**L** 0–10	1–4	Fenway Park	16,000	Recap	
6	October 29	at Brooklyn Dodgers	**L** 0–7	1–5	Ebbets Field	18,000	Recap	
7	November 5	**Green Bay Packers**	**L** 6–14	1–6	Wrigley Field	5,000	Recap	
8	November 12	**Cincinnati Reds**	**L** 9–12	1–7	Wrigley Field	7,000	Recap	
9	November 19	Brooklyn Dodgers	**L** 0–3	1–8	Wrigley Field	4,000	Recap	
10	November 30	**Chicago Bears**	**L** 6–22	1–9	Wrigley Field		Recap	
11	December 3	Boston Redskins	**T** 0–0	1–9–1	Wrigley Field	7,000	Recap	
Note: Intra-division opponents are in **bold** text. Thanksgiving: November 30.

== Roster ==
1933 Chicago Cardinals final roster
Backs: 32 Curly Hinchman FB/LB; 25 Mike Koken RB/CB/S/K; 30 Roddy Lamb RB/S; 26 Doc Ledbetter FB/LB; 19 Joe Lillard RB/CB/K; 18 Hal Moe RB/CB; 21 Les Molloy RB/CB/S; 28 Dick Nesbitt FB/LB; 27 Howie Tipton RB/CB	Linemen: 47 Gil Bergerson G/DG; 22 Lou Gordon T/DT; 44 Al Graham G/DG; 46 Phil Handler G/DG; 49 Walt Kiesling G/DG; 45 Frank McNally C/T/MG; 40 Tim Moynihan C/MG; 31 Jess Tinsley T/DT; 42 Jake Williams T/DT; 20 Tommy Yarr G/DG	Ends/Receivers: 24 Milan Creighton; 43 Chuck Kassel; 12 Dave Nisbet; rookies in italics

== Standings ==
NFL Western Division
	W	L	T	PCT	DIV	PF	PA	STK
Chicago Bears	10	2	1	.833	7–0	133	82	W4
Portsmouth Spartans	6	5	0	.545	3–4	128	87	L3
Green Bay Packers	5	7	1	.417	2–4	170	107	L1
Cincinnati Reds	3	6	1	.333	2–2	38	110	W1
Chicago Cardinals	1	9	1	.100	1–5	52	101	T1

Note: Tie games were not officially counted in the standings until 1972.
