= 1933 NFL Championship Game =

1933 American football championship game

Coordinates: 41.948°N 87.656°W

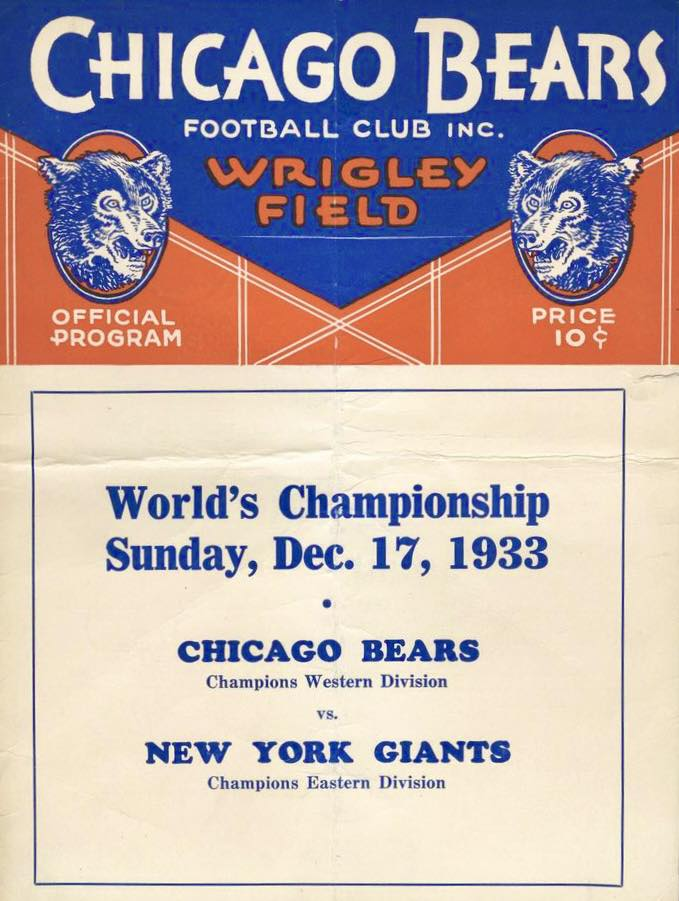
New York Giants (Eastern) (11–3)	Chicago Bears (Western) (10–2–1)
21	23
Head coach: Steve Owen	Head coach: George Halas
	1	2	3	4	Total
NYG	0	7	7	7	21
CHI	3	3	10	7	23
- Date: December 17, 1933
- Stadium: Wrigley Field; Chicago, Illinois
- Attendance: 25,000

Location in the United States

The 1933 NFL Championship Play-off Game was the first scheduled championship game of the National Football League (NFL) since its founding in 1920. It was played on December 17 at Wrigley Field in Chicago, and the attendance was estimated at 25,000.

The game was between the champions of the league's newly created divisions: the Chicago Bears (10–2–1) of the Western Division and the New York Giants (11–3) of the Eastern Division. Chicago gained the home field due to a better winning percentage in the regular season; after this year the home field alternated, with the Eastern Division champion hosting in even-numbered years and the Western in odd.

Chicago scored the winning touchdown with less than two minutes to go in the fourth quarter, capping a 23–21 victory. It was the Bears' second consecutive championship and third under founder and head coach George Halas.

== Background ==
Before the 1933 season, new Boston Redskins owner George Preston Marshall suggested to the NFL's owners that the league make some rule changes to increase the excitement of the game, including allowing passing from anywhere behind the line of scrimmage, and returning the goal posts to the goal line (which was changed after the 1973 season). Marshall then made another proposal a couple of months later: split the ten-team league into two divisions (of five teams each) and have the division winners meet in a championship game.

Although the owners were hesitant at first, and some believed that this brash new owner thought their game needed overhauling, the logic of his arguments won out, and they were implemented.

Before the season, the New York Giants acquired University of Michigan All-American quarterback Harry Newman, and versatile free agent halfback Ken Strong. The Giants finished the regular season 11–3, first in the new "Eastern Division", and Newman, center Mel Hein, and Red Badgro were named first team All-NFL. Newman led the NFL in passes completed (53), passing yards (973), touchdown passes (11), and longest pass completion (78 yards), with his passing yards total setting an NFL record.

The Bears went 10–2–1 and won the NFL's new Western Division, led by running backs Red Grange and Bronko Nagurski, and quarterbacked by Keith Molesworth. Nagurski and Grange combined for 810 yards rushing, and the game was the teams' third meeting of the season, with the Bears winning the teams' first regular-season match-up 14–10, and the Giants their second 3–0.

According to the Chicago Tribune, paid attendance for the game was "approximately 21,000, but several hundred more climbing the fences, the police politely turning their backs." Subsequent encyclopedic records peg game attendance at 26,000.

Before kickoff Newman informed officials he would be running several new trick plays in the game so they would not be confused when they saw them.

== Starters ==
According to the Chicago Tribune, starting elevens for the two teams were:

Chicago Bears	—	New York Giants
Name	Position	Name
Bill Hewitt	Left end	Red Badgro
Link Lyman	Left Tackle	Len Grant
Zuck Carlson	Left Guard	Butch Gibson
Ookie Miller	Center	Mel Hein
Joe Kopcha	Right Guard	Potsy Jones
George Musso	Right Tackle	Bill Owen
Bill Karr	Right End	Ray Flaherty
Carl Brumbaugh	Quarterback	Harry Newman
Keith Molesworth	LHB	Ken Strong
Gene Ronzani	RHB	Dale Burnett
Bronko Nagurski	Fullback	Bo Molenda

== Game summary ==
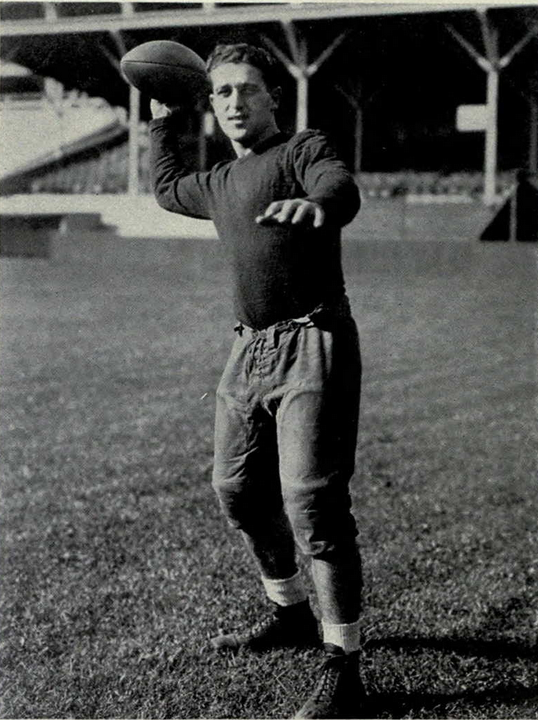
New York Giants quarterback Harry Newman.

The Giants called their first trick play, which was similar to another that was invented much later, early in the first quarter. A shift allowed Mel Hein, the team's center, to be an eligible receiver, but instead of passing the ball to him, after the snap, Newman handed it back to him and, pretending he still had it, dropped back as though he was going to pass. Hein, with the ball hidden under his jersey, ran from the Bears 45-yard line to their 15. Hein may have been able to gain more yards, but when he saw the open field in front of him he sprinted toward the goal line instead of waiting for his blockers like he was supposed to. The Giants were unable to score on this drive, as Chicago's defense tightened and they missed a field goal. Jack Manders kicked a field goal late in the first quarter, and another in the middle of the second quarter to give the Bears a 6–0 lead.

New York responded with a drive in which a 30 yard run ball to Newman who then passed it back to Strong for a touchdown. Strong kicked the extra point making the game 21–16 Giants. Chicago drove to the New York 36-yard line on the ensuing drive, and Nagurski again attempted a jump pass. This time the Giants were ready for the play but were fooled when the receiver, Bill Hewitt, who they were prepared to tackle, lateraled the ball to Karr, who ran 31 yards for the touchdown with under two minutes remaining. Their successful extra point attempt gave them a 23–21 lead.

The Giants drove to their own 40-yard line on the game's final drive, but running back Dale Burnett missed a wide open Hein on another trick play. Burnett threw a wobbly pass to Hein who was standing uncovered on the Bears 30-yard line. On the game's final play Grange tackled Badgro before he could complete the lateral portion of the hook and ladder play New York was attempting. Grange diagnosed the play correctly, and wrapped up Badgro's arms rather than his legs so he could not pitch the ball to Burnett.

The Bears repeated as champions with the victory, and the win marked George Halas' second title as head coach.

== Legacy ==
In a story the following day, the Associated Press described it as "probably the most spectacular game of the year" and "a brilliant display of offensive power".

The First Fifty Years, a 1969 book that chronicles the first half-century of the NFL, listed the 1933 NFL Championship game as the first of "Ten [Games] That Mattered." The National Football League's first championship game was as good as it should have been," says the book. "There are great occasions and great games, but they rarely get together. In 1933, they did...[.] They were two good teams playing on a meterological [sic] accident, a good field in Chicago in December. About 25,000 came out, the largest crowd since Red Grange first came up, and the game they saw was worth the price." The book concludes that "the game had already shown the fast-moving, high-scoring excitement in pro football's future."

Red Grange himself later called the game, "The greatest football game I ever saw or participated in."

In 2019, for the NFL's 100th season, the game was named #51 on the list of the greatest NFL games ever played.

Chicago Bears 23, New York Giants 21

Quarter	1	2	3	4	Total
Giants	0	7	7	7	21
Bears	3	3	10	7	23

at Wrigley Field, Chicago, Illinois

- Date: Sunday, December 17, 1933
- Game time: 1:45 p.m. CST
- Game attendance: "approximately 21,000" to 26,000
- Referee: Tommy Hughitt
- Pro-Football-Reference.com

Game information

Scoring

- First quarter
  - CHI – Jack Manders 16-yard field goal. Bears 3–0
- Second quarter
  - CHI – Jack Manders 40-yard field goal. Bears 6–0
  - NYG – Red Badgro 29-yard pass from Harry Newman (Ken Strong kick). Giants 7–6
- Third quarter
  - CHI – Jack Manders 15-yard field goal. Bears 9–7
  - NYG – Max Krause 1-yard run (Strong kick). Giants 14–9
  - CHI – Bill Karr 8-yard pass from Bronko Nagurski (Manders kick). Bears 16–14
- Fourth quarter
  - NYG – Ken Strong 8-yard pass from Harry Newman (Strong kick). Giants 21–16
  - CHI – Bill Karr 31-yard lateral from Bill Hewitt after 3-yard pass from Nagurski to Hewitt (Carl Brumbaugh kick). Bears 23–21

Top passers

- NYG – Harry Newman – 13/19, 209 yards, 2 TD, 1 INT
- CHI – George Corbett – 7/13, 169 yards, TD

Top rushers

- NYG – Kink Richards – 5 rushes, 40 yards
- CHI – Gene Ronzani – 12 rushes, 73 yards

Top receivers

- NYG – Dale Burnett – 5 receptions, 94 yards
- CHI – Carl Brumbaugh – 3 receptions, 88 yards

== Officials ==
- Referee: Tommy Hughitt
- Umpire: Bobby Cahn
- Head linesman: Dan Tehan
- Field judge: Robert Karch

The NFL had only four game officials in 1933; the back judge was added in 1947, the line judge in 1965, and the side judge in 1978.

== Players' shares ==
The gate receipts for the game were about $21,100. Each player on the winning Bears team received about $210, while Giants players made around $140 each.

== Quotes ==
How should I know? I was only playing.

— Harry Newman, when a linesmen asked him who won the game right after it ended.

== See also ==
- 1933 NFL season
- History of the NFL championship
- Bears–Giants rivalry
