= 1933 Boston Redskins season =

NFL team season

- Owner: George Preston Marshall
- General manager: Dennis J. Shea
- Head coach: Lone Star Dietz
- Home stadium: Fenway Park

Results
- Record: 5–5–2
- Division place: 3rd NFL Eastern
- Playoffs: Did not qualify

The 1933 Boston Redskins season was the franchise's 2nd season in the National Football League. The team finished with a record of five wins, five losses, and two ties, and finished in third place in the Eastern Division of the National Football League. This was the first year that the franchise used the name "Redskins", a name used by the team until it was retired in 2020.

== Schedule ==
Week	Date	Opponent	Result	Record	Venue	Sources
1	September 17	at Green Bay Packers	**T** 7–7	0–0–1	City Stadium	
2	Bye					
3	October 1	at Chicago Bears	**L** 0–7	0–1–1	Soldier Field	
3	October 4	at **Pittsburgh Pirates**	**W** 21–6	1–1–1	Forbes Field	
4	October 8	**New York Giants**	**W** 21–20	2–1–1	Fenway Park	
5	October 15	Portsmouth Spartans	**L** 0–13	2–2–1	Fenway Park	
6	October 22	Chicago Cardinals	**W** 10–0	3–2–1	Fenway Park	
7	October 29	**Pittsburgh Pirates**	**L** 14–16	3–3–1	Fenway Park	
8	November 5	Chicago Bears	**W** 10–0	4–3–1	Fenway Park	
9	November 12	at **New York Giants**	**L** 0–7	4–4–1	Polo Grounds	
10	November 19	Green Bay Packers	**W** 20–7	5–4–1	Fenway Park	
11	November 26	at **Brooklyn Dodgers**	**L** 0–14	5–5–1	Ebbets Field	
12	December 3	at Chicago Cardinals	**T** 0–0	5–5–2	Wrigley Field	
Note: Intra-division opponents are in **bold** text.

== Roster ==
1933 Boston Redskins final roster
Backs: 29 Marger Apsit RB/S; 20 Cliff Battles RB/CB; 13 Bob Campiglio RB/CB; 31 Roy Horstmann FB/LB; 15 Benny LaPresta RB/CB/S; 25 Jim Musick FB/LB/K; 11 Erny Pinckert RB/CB; 27 Louis Weller RB/CB/S; Ends/Receivers: 32 Paul Collins; 24 Ike Frankian; 26 Steve Hokuf	Linemen: 35 Hal Cherne T/DT/G/DG; 23 Orien Crow C/MG; 17 Turk Edwards T/DT; 28 George Hurley G/DG; 37 Marne Intrieri T/DT; 16 Larry Johnson C/MG; 19 Jim Kamp G/DG; 34 Jim MacMurdo G/DG; 21 Jack Riley T/DT; 33 Dale Waters G/DG; rookies in italics

== Standings ==
NFL Eastern Division
	W	L	T	PCT	DIV	PF	PA	STK
New York Giants	11	3	0	.786	7–1	244	101	W7
Brooklyn Dodgers	5	4	1	.556	2–2–1	93	54	L2
Boston Redskins	5	5	2	.500	2–3	103	97	T1
Philadelphia Eagles	3	5	1	.375	1–2	77	158	L2
Pittsburgh Pirates	3	6	2	.333	1–5–1	67	208	L3

Note: Tie games were not officially counted in the standings until 1972.
