= Forrest Douds =

American football player and coach (1905–1979)

No. 15, 12, 47, 44
- Position: Tackle

Personal information
- Born: April 21, 1905; Rochester, Pennsylvania, U.S.
- Died: August 16, 1979 (aged 74); Sewickley, Pennsylvania, U.S.
- Listed height: 5 ft 10 in (1.78 m)
- Listed weight: 216 lb (98 kg)

Career information
- College: Washington & Jefferson

Career history

Playing
- 1930: Providence Steam Roller
- 1930–1931: Portsmouth Spartans
- 1932: Chicago Cardinals
- 1933–1934: Pittsburgh Pirates

Coaching
- 1933: Pittsburgh Pirates

Awards and highlights
- 1930 NFL All-Pro Team; First-team All-American (1928); 2× Second-team All-American (1927, 1929); Head coaching record: 3–6–2; First coach of the Pittsburgh Steelers; Beaver County Sports Hall of Fame (1976)
- Coaching profile at Pro Football Reference
- Stats at Pro Football Reference

Forrest McCreery "Jap" Douds (April 21, 1905 – August 16, 1979) was an All-American football player at Washington and Jefferson College in suburban Washington, Pennsylvania, where he was selected as an All-American three times and was the first player ever selected to the East–West Game in two separate seasons. He played professional American football player for the Portsmouth Spartans, Providence Steam Roller, Chicago Cardinals, and the Pittsburgh Pirates. He was named to the 1930 NFL All-Pro Team. In 1933, he became the first coach of the Pittsburgh Steelers in 1933 leading the team to a 3–6–2 record before being replaced in the off-season.

He was inducted into the Beaver County Sports Hall of Fame in 1976.

== Early life ==
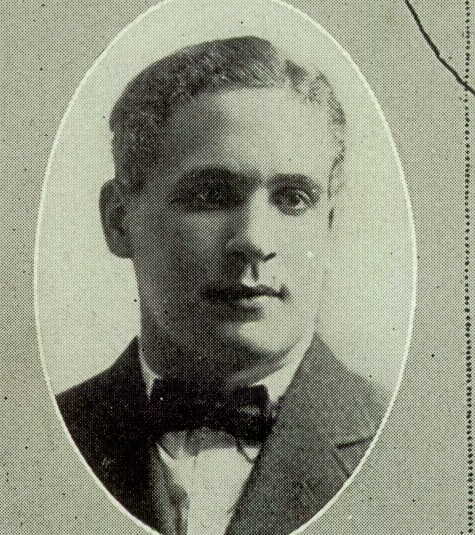
Douds at Rochester High School in 1924

Douds was born on April 21, 1905, in Rochester, Pennsylvania, a suburb in Beaver County, Pennsylvania.

He grew up on Jackson Street in Rochester with his parents Frank and Mary Douds. As a young man attending Rochester High School, Douds was described as "the best athlete [Rochester] has ever seen". He participated on the school's football team the entirety of his tenure at Rochester and was named a team captain in his senior season. He also played basketball beginning his sophomore year and was in the school's choir. He was also described as a "good leader" and was praised for his academic success. During the 1920 school year, he was a part of the team that won the Pennsylvania State Championship.

He was given the nickname "Jap" during his high school years which stuck with him well into his professional coaching tenure. Douds graduated from Rochester High School in 1924 and enrolled in Washington & Jefferson College the same year.

Douds was inducted into the Beaver County Sports Hall of Fame in 1976.

== College career ==
At Washington & Jefferson College, Douds excelled as a standout guard, becoming the first player in school history to earn Grantland Rice All-America honors in both 1927 and 1928. He also made history as the first college football player to receive an invitation to the East-West Shrine Game twice.

In his debut season with the Presidents in 1927, the team finished with a 7-0-2 record, securing victories over Lafayette (14–0) and Bucknell (19–3). That year also saw W&J defeat Carnegie Tech 20–6 in front of a record crowd of 12,000 spectators. As a senior, Douds made a significant impact by blocking three punts during the traditional Thanksgiving Day matchup against West Virginia University in Morgantown. At the end of the season, he was honored with the Walter Camp award for "Best Lineman in the East."

== Playing career ==
Douds began his playing career in 1930 with Providence Steam Roller. He was named to the 1930 NFL All-Pro team for his efforts during the season. The following year, he moved on to play with the Portsmouth Spartans, where he recorded 16 starts in two seasons with the team at the offensive tackle position. He played one season in 1932 with the Chicago Cardinals where he recorded four starts in 10 total games played. In 1933, he joined the Pittsburgh Steelers (then Pittsburgh Pirates) on their inaugural roster. He recorded a single rushing attempt for two yards in the seven games he played. His playing career came to an end after the 1934 season.

== Coaching ==
=== Pittsburgh Steelers ===
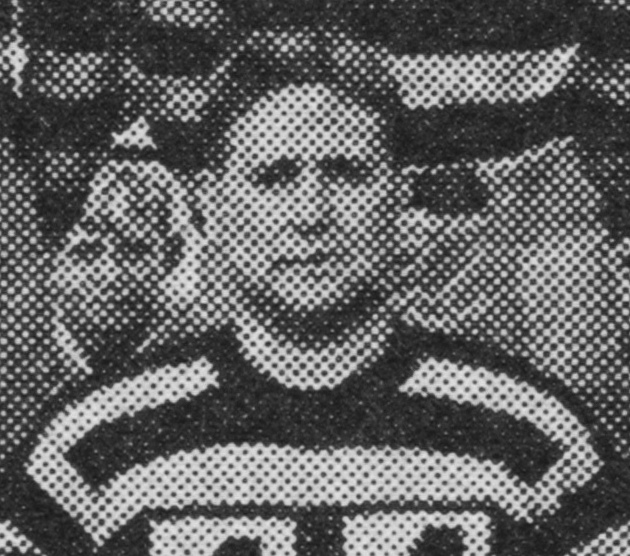
Douds with the Pirates in 1934

Despite joining the team as a player in 1933, the Pittsburgh Steelers lacked a head coach. The vacant position was given to Douds by team owner Art Rooney, making Douds the first ever head coach of the Pittsburgh Steelers. His position as a head coach while also playing as an offensive tackle/guard was relatively common for the era in which the NFL was less profitable.

In his inaugural game with the then Pittsburgh Pirates, he coached the team to a 23–2 loss to the New York Giants at Forbes Field. The only points scored during the game were from a safety as a result of a blocked punt that went out of the back of the endzone. The Pirates got their first win under Douds with a 14–13 victory over the Chicago Cardinals. This was the first game in Steelers history in which the team scored a touchdown. It came off of a 99-yard interception return from Marty Kottler. It became apparent early on that the squad lacked talent. Besides the route put on them in Week 1, the Pirates were unable to put together any significant drives through many of their games under Douds. During Week 2's narrow win, quarterback Tony Holm fumbled the football, resulting in a 51-yard fumble return touchdown from Frank McNally. Against the Boston Redskins in Week 3, the team's only scoring drive resulted in a one-yard touchdown run from Angelo Brovelli late in the game when the Redskins had already secured a lead of 21–0. They were unable to score any points in a shut out loss to the Green Bay Packers that ended with a final score of 0-47 for the Pirates. Douds and the Pirates replicated this performance the following week with a scoreless tie against the Cincinnati Reds. This was also the first tie in Steelers history and only scoreless one. In total the team only scraped together 67 points in 11 games, a league worst 6.09 points per game. He finished with a head-coaching record of 3-6-2 and was replaced by Luby DiMeolo in 1934.

In total, Douds' team finished allowing a league-worst 208 points. Out of the ten teams in the NFL that existed at the time, the Pirates posted the worst scoring offense and the worst defense.

== Later life ==
On August 29, 1931, Douds married his first wife, Catherine McLaughlin, a schoolteacher, in Pittsburgh. The two would later divorce sometime after 1950 and he would marry Selma Bauman, another Pittsburgh native. He had two sons; Forrest Jr. and Paul as well as two daughters; Sarah and Mary.

According to the 1950 United States Federal Census, he worked in "advertisement" for a brewery and resided in Stowe, Pennsylvania with his family.

Douds died in Sewickley Valley Hospital on August 16, 1979.
