= James Harrison (American football) =

American football player (born 1978)

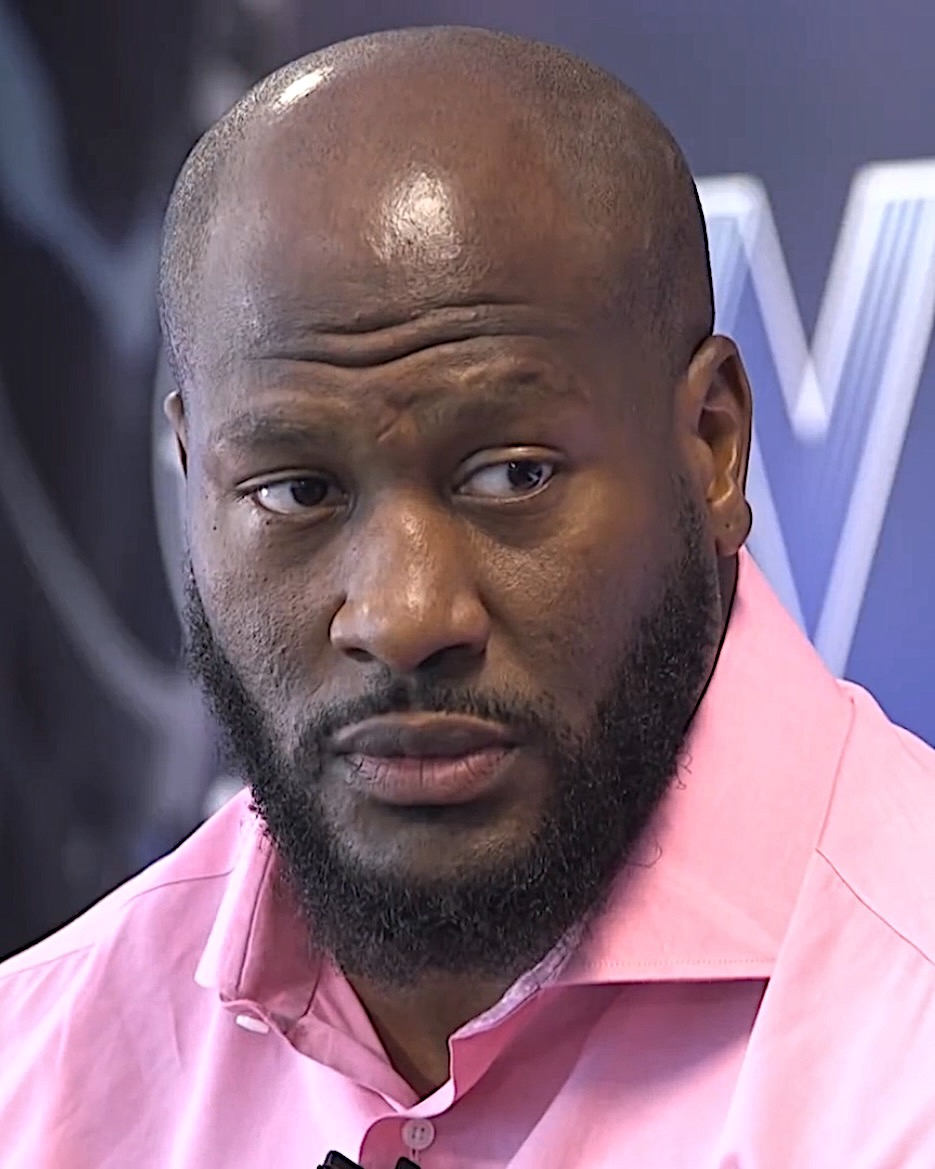
- Harrison during an interview in 2018

No. 93, 53, 92
- Position: Linebacker

Personal information
- Born: May 4, 1978 (age 48); Akron, Ohio, U.S.
- Listed height: 6 ft 0 in (1.83 m)
- Listed weight: 242 lb (110 kg)

Career information
- High school: Coventry (Akron)
- College: Kent State (1998–2001)
- NFL draft: 2002: undrafted

Career history
- Pittsburgh Steelers (2002–2003); Baltimore Ravens (2004)*; → Rhein Fire (2004); Pittsburgh Steelers (2004–2012); Cincinnati Bengals (2013); Pittsburgh Steelers (2014–2017); New England Patriots (2017)
- * Offseason or practice squad member only

Awards and highlights
- 2× Super Bowl champion (XL, XLIII); NFL Defensive Player of the Year (2008); 2× First-team All-Pro (2008, 2010); 2× Second-team All-Pro (2007, 2009); 5× Pro Bowl (2007–2011); NFL forced fumbles leader (2008); Pittsburgh Steelers Hall of Honor; First-team All-MAC (2001); NFL record: Longest interception return in a Super Bowl: 100 yards (XLIII)

Career NFL statistics
- Total tackles: 811
- Sacks: 84.5
- Forced fumbles: 34
- Fumble recoveries: 9
- Interceptions: 8
- Defensive touchdowns: 1
- Stats at Pro Football Reference

James Henry Harrison Jr. (born May 4, 1978) is an American former professional football player who was a linebacker in the National Football League (NFL). He played college football for the Kent State Golden Flashes and was signed by the Pittsburgh Steelers as an undrafted free agent in 2002. A five-time Pro Bowl selection, Harrison won two Super Bowls with the Steelers: XL and XLIII. In 2008, he became the only undrafted player to be named Associated Press NFL Defensive Player of the Year. Harrison was known for his hard-hitting style during games.

Harrison also played for NFL Europe's Rhein Fire and had brief stints with the Baltimore Ravens and Cincinnati Bengals. After the 2013 season, he stated that he would be retiring from the NFL, but Harrison came out of retirement a few weeks later to return to the Steelers and then spent part of his final NFL season with the New England Patriots. Harrison ranks third on the Steelers' all-time sack leaders list, with 80.5. He currently appears on FOX Sports 1 as a football analyst.

== Early life ==
Born in Akron, Ohio, Harrison was the youngest of 14 children to James Sr. (a chemical truck driver) and Mildred. He played Little League baseball in Scranton, Pennsylvania for Sloan Little League's Green Team. Harrison was selected to the All-Star team in 1991. He grew up in Akron, and his favorite NFL team was the Cleveland Browns, who played only 40 miles (64 km) from his house. Initially, his mother did not want him to play football. It took both Harrison and his childhood best friend, David Walker, to convince her. When Harrison started to play, he excelled at both linebacker and running back.

Harrison attended two high schools his freshman year, Archbishop Hoban High School then Coventry High School, where, in addition to football, he also participated in track & field, competing in events ranging from the shot put to the high jump. Harrison had personal records of 15.63 meters (51 ft 3in) in the shot put, 38.86 meters in the discus throw (127 ft 5 in), and 1.85 meters (6 ft 1 in) in the high jump. He was also a state-qualifier in the 4 × 100 m relay. Harrison along with Jonathan Holloman were two of the first African-Americans to play football at Coventry. Harrison graduated in 1998.

Harrison's high school football ability was great, but his lack of maturity at times was a struggle. Harrison did not pay attention to his grades or college entrance tests, and by his senior year, Harrison had become disruptive to his football team. Early in his senior year, Coventry staff had to suspend him for two games for challenging an assistant coach to a fight. After returning from his suspension, in his next game, Harrison began the game by rushing thrice for nearly 100 yards and two touchdowns. After his second touchdown, Harrison ran down the opposing team's sideline, but was ejected and later suspended for one game for making obscene gestures to the fans. Harrison was in court soon thereafter, after he shot a BB gun in the school locker room towards a defensive coach. Harrison pled guilty to a minor charge and was able to return to school to finish his senior year. Due to his off-the-field issues, powerhouse football programs like Ohio State, Notre Dame, and Nebraska rescinded their scholarship offers.

== College career ==
Harrison attended Kent State University and walked on the Kent State Golden Flashes football team. After sitting out his freshman season in 1998 due to NCAA academic guidelines, Harrison became a starter for the last three games of the 1999 season and led the team with 106 total tackles and 13 tackles for a loss. He also had an interception and three fumble recoveries.

During his last collegiate game against Miami University, Harrison finished with 12 tackles, five sacks, and a forced fumble. At the end of the fourth quarter, he sacked future teammate Ben Roethlisberger on third and fourth down to seal a 24–20 victory. In 2001, Harrison recorded 98 total tackles, 20 tackles for loss, and led the MAC conference with 15 sacks, while also being voted to first-team Mid-American Conference.

After graduating, Harrison returned in 2010 to be inducted into Kent State's Varsity "K" Hall of Fame along with San Diego Chargers tight end, Antonio Gates. Harrison also made a donation of $100k to his alma mater, who in turn named the field house in his honor. In 2013, Kent State retired his No. 16 jersey.

== Professional career ==
=== Pittsburgh Steelers (first stint) ===
Harrison went undrafted in the 2002 NFL draft, as teams feared he was too short (six feet) to play linebacker, and too light (240 pounds) to play on the defensive line. A few teams did send him training camp invites. The Steelers signed Harrison as an undrafted rookie in 2002, making him the first Kent State alumnus to play at linebacker for the team since Hall of Famer Jack Lambert.

Harrison spent two years on and off the practice squad for the Steelers, being released thrice, and was also briefly on the active roster towards the end of the 2002 season, playing only on special teams. Teammate and fellow linebacker, James Farrior, later told NFL Network that Harrison was so green early on in his career that he would simply "give up" on plays on which he was struggling and even would ask the coaches not to play him when he was struggling. Farrior said, "He was a knucklehead that didn't know the plays. We'd be in practice, in training camp, and he might not know what he was doing so he'd just stop and throw his hands up and tell (the coaches) to get him out of there. We thought the guy was crazy."

Harrison wore number 93 during this period before adopting his more well known number 92, which at the time was worn by fellow linebacker and Pro Bowler Jason Gildon.

=== Baltimore Ravens and Rhein Fire ===
Harrison signed a reserve/future contract with the Baltimore Ravens on January 15, 2004. He was allocated to the Rhein Fire of NFL Europe. Harrison played in five games, all starts, for the Fire during the 2004 NFL Europe season, recording 27 defensive tackles, three special teams tackles, and a pass deflection. He was cut by the Ravens on June 17, 2004.

=== Pittsburgh Steelers (second stint) ===
==== 2004 ====
After being cut for a fourth time, Harrison considered not playing anymore. Shortly thereafter, he was signed a fourth time by the Steelers during training camp after Clark Haggans sustained an injury in an offseason weightlifting accident. Showing much improvement, Harrison made the final roster and remained with the Steelers through the 2012 season. Harrison later told the Beaver County Times that if not for Haggans's injury, he planned to retire from football at age 26 to focus on becoming a veterinarian, something that Harrison still plans on doing now that his football career has ended. Harrison also considered following in his father's footsteps to become a truck driver, and to this day does have a commercial driver's license.

Throughout the 2004 season, Harrison mostly played on special teams and on defense at linebacker, with occasional reps at defensive end. His first career start came against his hometown team, the Cleveland Browns in Cleveland on November 14 after teammate Joey Porter and Browns running back William Green were ejected for fighting during the pregame warm-ups. Harrison had a good game statistically in the Steelers' 24–10 victory against their hated rival.

Harrison scored his first career touchdown on a fumble recovery in the final week of the season against the Buffalo Bills.

==== 2005–2006 ====
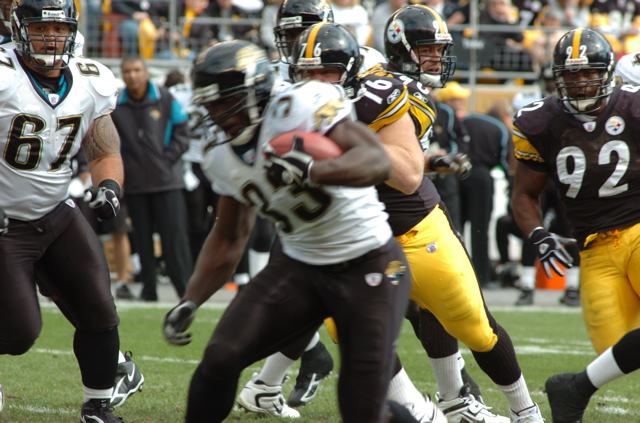
Harrison (92) chases after Greg Jones in 2005

Harrison started in three games of the 2005 season when starting linebacker Clark Haggans was injured. His biggest highlight of the year was in a game against the San Diego Chargers, where he intercepted a Drew Brees pass for a 25-yard return. During the return, he made a huge leap over LaDainian Tomlinson, the Chargers star running back.

Harrison gained some attention and popularity when he restrained a Cleveland Browns fan during a 41–0 Pittsburgh win on Christmas Eve. The intoxicated fan was on the field when Harrison lifted the man and slammed him on the ground. Harrison restrained the fan until authorities took him away.

The Steelers went on to win Super Bowl XL that season. Although Harrison was not a major factor in the game, he did play and earn a Super Bowl ring with the team, recording a team-high three special teams tackles.

==== 2007 ====
In the 2007 offseason, with longtime head coach Bill Cowher resigning after 15 seasons and Mike Tomlin taking over the reins, the Steelers controversially cut Joey Porter for salary cap reasons. Although the Steelers drafted two linebackers with their first two picks that year (Lawrence Timmons and LaMarr Woodley), Harrison was appointed the starter in place of Porter. The decision would ultimately pay off, as Harrison would go on to have a breakout season, making All-Pro Second-team and earning his first trip to the Pro Bowl as a starter on the AFC squad.

On November 5, Harrison had a standout game on Monday Night Football against the Baltimore Ravens. He piled up 9 total tackles, 3.5 sacks, 3 forced fumbles, 1 fumble recovery, and 1 interception. The most memorable moment of the game, however, was Harrison's tackle of Baltimore safety Ed Reed. After a Steelers punt by Daniel Sepulveda, Reed had recovered the kick and was looking to return it. As Reed ran up the sidelines, he was blindsided by Harrison and the ball was knocked away from Reed's grasp. Pittsburgh linebacker Lawrence Timmons immediately recovered the fumble. The Steelers would go on to blow out the Ravens, 38–7.

On November 26, during a Monday Night Football game, an announcer gave Harrison the nickname, "Mr. Monday Night", because of his outstanding performance on November 5. He piled up 8.5 sacks, 7 forced fumbles, 3 recovered fumbles, and 98 tackles on the year. He was voted team MVP for the 2007 season.

==== 2008 ====
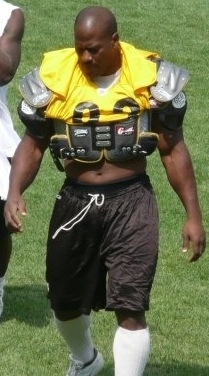
Harrison during training camp in 2008

During Week 4 against the Baltimore Ravens on Monday Night Football, Harrison recorded 10 total tackles, 2.5 sacks, two tackles for a loss, and a forced fumble.

Along with LaMarr Woodley, who by this point was a starter in his own right, after the team chose not to re-sign Clark Haggans the previous offseason, Harrison and Woodley had become arguably the team's best pass-rushing duo since Greg Lloyd and Kevin Greene in 1994. Harrison amassed 16 sacks, breaking the team record set by Mike Merriweather in 1984. The two teammates set a team record with 27.5 sacks.

Harrison also played special teams on a regular basis, making him one of the few regular NFL starters to also play special teams. His most notable special teams play for 2008, however, arguably cost the Steelers their game against the New York Giants in Week 8. With the Steelers leading 14–12 in the fourth quarter and having to punt from their own end zone, Harrison played as long snapper after regular long snapper Greg Warren suffered a season-ending knee injury earlier in the game. Harrison inadvertently snapped it over Mitch Berger's head for a safety, tying the score.

On January 5, 2009, Harrison was named the AP NFL Defensive Player of the Year for the 2008 season, beating out Cowboys linebacker DeMarcus Ware for the award. Harrison became the first undrafted player to win the award.

During Super Bowl XLIII, Harrison made his most famous play when he intercepted a pass from Cardinals quarterback Kurt Warner at the goal line and ran back the length of the field for a 100-yard touchdown at the end of the first half. In a memorable scene, Harrison collapsed in the endzone and spent several minutes regaining his breath as his teammates celebrated. It was the longest play in Super Bowl history (surpassing Desmond Howard's 99-yard kickoff return in Super Bowl XXXI, being broken by Jacoby Jones in Super Bowl XLVII with a 108-yard kickoff return) and helped the Steelers defeat the Arizona Cardinals 27–23. It was also the longest interception return in Steelers franchise history, surpassing the 99-yard return by Martin "Butch" Kottler which occurred in the club's second ever game and was the oldest team record in the books.

Before the game, Gregg Easterbrook (author of Tuesday Morning Quarterback from Page 2 on ESPN.com) named Harrison the 2008 Tuesday Morning Quarterback Non-QB Non-RB NFL MVP. When receiving the trophy for the award, Harrison said he never even heard of the award. The week before, Easterbrook named Harrison to his annual All-Unwanted All-Pros due to his struggles earlier in his career of having been cut four times, three by the Steelers.

On February 7, 2009, Harrison was parodied on Saturday Night Live's Weekend Update by cast member Kenan Thompson. Thompson depicted Harrison as being seemingly still out of breath and exhausted after his 100-yard interception return in the Super Bowl the week before.

==== 2009 ====
On April 13, 2009, it was reported that Harrison signed a 6-year, $51.75 million contract extension with the Steelers. In four games in October Harrison had 7.0 sacks, 25 tackles, two forced fumbles and a fumble recovery. He earned AFC defensive player of the month honors for October. Harrison ended the Season with 79 tackles, 60 of them being solo, and 10 sacks. This outstanding performance made him a starter in the Pro Bowl that year. Although Heath Miller, LaMarr Woodley, and Casey Hampton were named Pro Bowlers as well, Harrison was the only starter from his team.

==== 2010 ====
Harrison's 2010 season was marred by committing several penalties and fouls. He was fined for the hits that were deemed to be illegal by referees and the NFL. In Week 2, Harrison was fined for flipping Vince Young of the Titans. On October 17, he knocked out two Browns wide receivers; Mohammed Massaquoi, and his former college teammate, Josh Cribbs. On Halloween against the Saints, he hit quarterback Drew Brees late from behind. Against the Raiders, he hit another QB, Jason Campbell. The following week at Buffalo, another incident occurred when Ryan Fitzpatrick had thrown a complete pass to David Nelson, Harrison came out of the line and speared Fitzpatrick. Harrison was fined an estimated $120,000 in total.

In 2010 Harrison logged 100 tackles total, 70 solo tackles, 10.5 sacks, 2 interceptions and 6 forced fumbles.

Harrison would help the Steelers reach the Super Bowl for the third time in six years. In Super Bowl XLV, Harrison recorded a sack on Aaron Rodgers, but lost 31–25 to the Green Bay Packers. Harrison was ranked 21st by his fellow players on the NFL Top 100 Players of 2011.

==== 2011–2012 ====
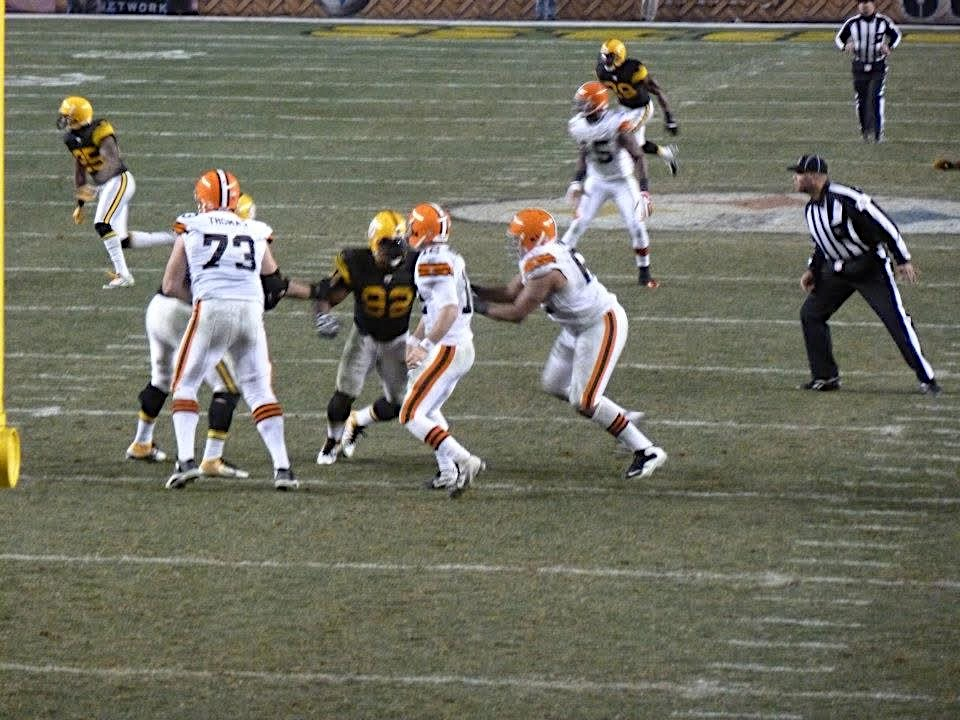
Harrison during a game against the Browns in 2011

In 2011, Harrison recorded 59 tackles and nine sacks in 11 games. In 2012, he had six sacks and 70 tackles.

On March 9, 2013, Harrison was released by the Steelers for salary cap reasons after they could not agree on a pay cut.

=== Cincinnati Bengals ===
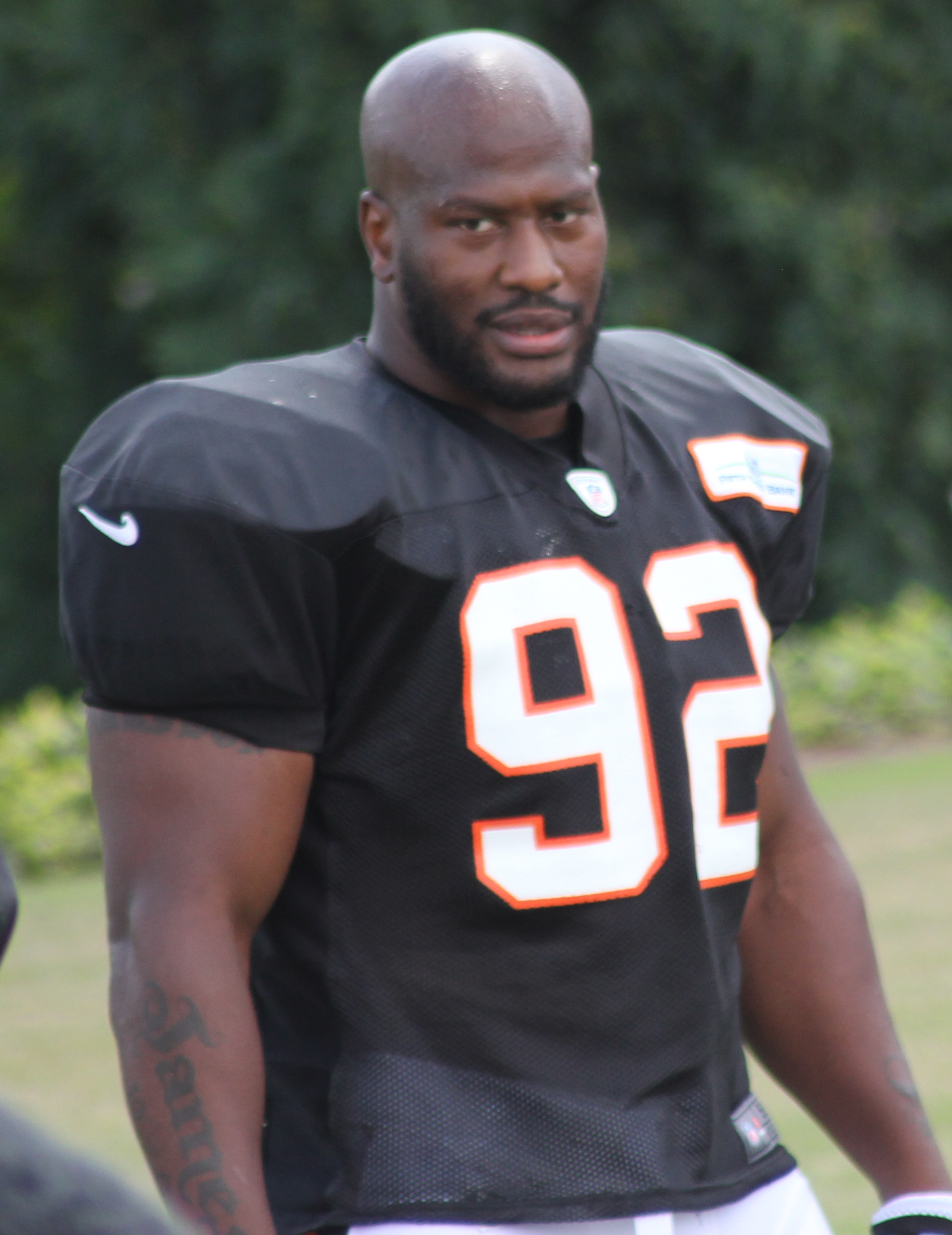
Harrison during training camp in 2013

Harrison signed with the Cincinnati Bengals on April 23, 2013. He recorded 30 total tackles (16 solo), two sacks, and an interception in limited playing time.

On March 13, 2014, Harrison was released by the Bengals.

=== Initial retirement ===
On August 30, 2014, Harrison announced his retirement and officially retired as a member of the Steelers on September 5.

=== Pittsburgh Steelers (third stint) ===
On September 23, 2014, rumors surfaced that Harrison was set to return to the NFL after Mike Tomlin noted in a press conference that there were significant injuries suffered by members of the Steelers defense. The Steelers posted a message on their Twitter page announcing that Harrison would return to the Steelers. He officially signed with the Steelers that same day. Harrison recorded 45 tackles and 5.5 sacks in 11 games.

On March 22, 2015, Harrison signed a two-year, $2.65 million extension with a $500,000 signing bonus.

On February 17, 2016, Harrison announced that he would be returning for a 14th season with the team.

On November 20, 2016, Harrison surpassed Jason Gildon to become the Steelers' all-time sack leader with 77.5, during a 24–9 victory over the Cleveland Browns and finished the season with 79.5 sacks during his Steelers career. On January 8, 2017, he recorded ten combined tackles, sacked Matt Moore 1½ times, and forced a fumble in a 30–12 AFC Wildcard victory over the Miami Dolphins.

On March 1, 2017, Harrison signed a two-year contract extension with the Steelers. Through the first 12 games of the 2017 season, Harrison played only 29 snaps, with 15 of those coming in Week 6 against the Kansas City Chiefs. Following injuries to Ryan Shazier and Tyler Matakevich and the subsequent move of Arthur Moats from the outside to the inside linebacker position, Harrison played 11 snaps in Week 14 against the Baltimore Ravens. On December 23, 2017, Harrison was released by the Steelers after only playing in five games and being a healthy scratch for most of the season.

=== New England Patriots ===
On December 26, 2017, Harrison signed a one-year contract with the New England Patriots. In his Patriots debut, Harrison registered two sacks, a forced fumble, and five tackles against the New York Jets. The Patriots went on to reach Super Bowl LII, but lost 41–33 to the Philadelphia Eagles.

=== Second retirement ===
On April 16, 2018, Harrison announced his second retirement from the NFL after 15 seasons, saying in an Instagram post, "I've missed way too much for way too long...I'm done".

== NFL career statistics ==
Legend
	NFL Defensive Player of the Year
	Won the Super Bowl
	Led the league
**Bold**	Career high

=== Regular season ===
Year	Team	Games		Tackles				Fumbles			Interceptions					
Year	Team	GP	GS	Cmb	Solo	Ast	Sck	FF	FR	Yds	Int	Yds	Avg	Lng	TD	PD
2002	PIT	1	0	0	0	0	0.0	0	0	0	0	0	0	0	0	0
2004	PIT	16	4	50	39	11	1.0	0	1	**18**	0	0	0	0	0	3
2005	PIT	16	3	57	43	14	3.0	0	1	0	1	25	25.0	25	0	3
2006	PIT	11	1	20	14	6	0.0	0	0	0	0	0	0	0	0	0
2007	PIT	16	16	98	**76**	22	8.5	**7**	**3**	0	1	20	20.0	20	0	2
2008	PIT	15	15	**101**	67	**34**	**16.0**	**7**	0	-18	1	**33**	**33.0**	**33**	0	3
2009	PIT	16	16	79	60	19	10.0	5	2	0	0	0	0	0	0	2
2010	PIT	16	16	100	70	30	10.5	6	1	0	**2**	2	1.0	2	0	**5**
2011	PIT	11	11	59	48	11	9.0	2	0	0	0	0	0	0	0	0
2012	PIT	13	13	70	49	21	6.0	2	0	0	0	0	0	0	0	0
2013	CIN	15	10	31	16	15	2.0	0	1	0	1	9	9.0	9	0	1
2014	PIT	11	4	45	29	16	5.5	0	0	0	0	0	0	0	0	0
2015	PIT	15	1	40	27	13	5.0	2	0	0	1	6	6.0	6	0	4
2016	PIT	15	7	53	39	14	5.0	2	0	0	1	0	0	0	0	1
2017	PIT	5	0	3	3	0	1.0	0	0	0	0	0	0	0	0	0
2017	NE	1	0	5	3	2	2.0	1	0	0	0	0	0	0	0	0
Career		193	117	811	583	228	84.5	34	9	0	8	95	12.0	33	0	24

=== Postseason ===
Year	Team	Games		Tackles				Fumbles			Interceptions					
Year	Team	GP	GS	Cmb	Solo	Ast	Sck	FF	FR	Yds	Int	Yds	Avg	Lng	TD	PD
2004	PIT	2	0	3	2	1	0.0	0	0	0	0	0	0	0	0	0
2005	PIT	2	0	4	2	2	0.0	0	0	0	0	0	0	0	0	0
2007	PIT	1	1	10	6	4	1.5	0	0	0	0	0	0	0	0	0
2008	PIT	3	3	14	10	4	1.0	0	0	0	**1**	**100**	**100.0**	**100T**	**1**	**1**
2010	PIT	3	3	15	11	4	**4.0**	0	0	0	0	0	0	0	0	**1**
2011	PIT	1	1	3	2	1	0.0	0	0	0	0	0	0	0	0	**1**
2013	CIN	1	0	3	3	0	0.0	0	0	0	0	0	0	0	0	0
2014	PIT	1	1	2	0	2	0.0	0	0	0	0	0	0	0	0	0
2015	PIT	2	0	11	9	2	2.0	0	0	0	0	0	0	0	0	0
2016	PIT	3	3	**20**	**15**	**5**	2.5	**1**	0	0	0	0	0	0	0	0
2017	NE	3	2	8	7	1	0.0	0	0	0	0	0	0	0	0	0
Career		22	14	93	67	26	11.0	1	0	0	1	100	100.0	100T	1	3

== Acting ==
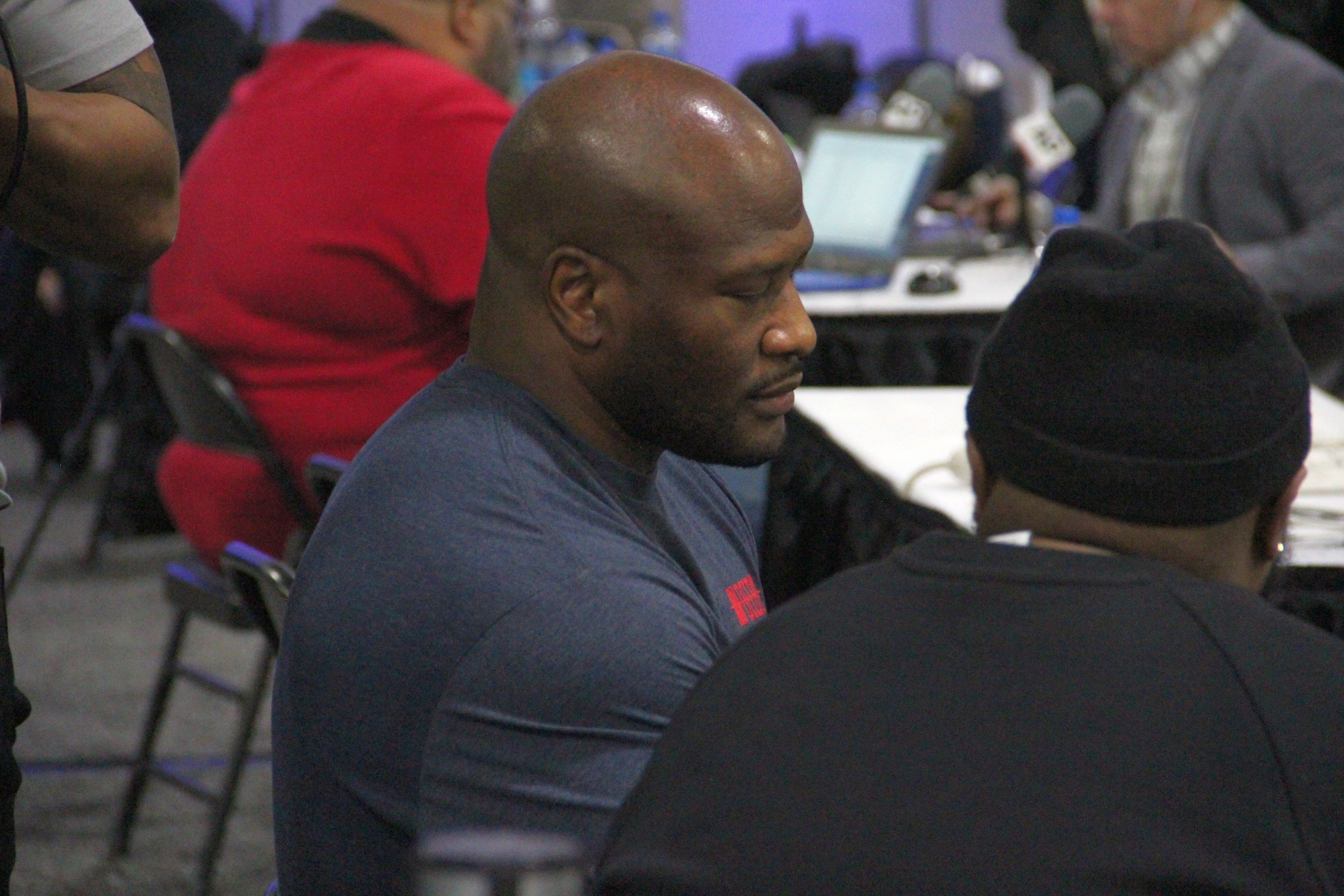
Harrison in 2019

Harrison plays Apocalypse on Heels. He also appeared on S.W.A.T. in the Season 2 episode "The B-Team", playing Marcus King, the social media manager for the Los Angeles Fire Department when the LAFD goes against the Los Angeles Police Department in a charity competition.

== Personal life ==
As well as being nicknamed "Silverback", Harrison's teammates also call him Deebo, after the character from the Friday movies.

Harrison has two sons, James III, born in 2007, and Henry, born in 2009. Harrison made the news in August 2015 for refusing to let either of his sons keep student-athlete awards that were deemed participation trophies they had received from a sports program. In an Instagram post, Harrison wrote: "While I am very proud of my boys for everything they do and will encourage them till the day I die, these trophies will be given back until they EARN a real trophy [...]". Harrison's post was mostly met with positive feedback.

Harrison elected not to visit the White House with the rest of the team after the Steelers won Super Bowl XLIII. Skipping the visit gained some media attention, as Harrison said that Barack Obama (who supported the Steelers in the game and considers his second favorite NFL team after his hometown team, Chicago Bears) would have invited the Arizona Cardinals had they won: "This is how I feel — if you want to see the Pittsburgh Steelers, invite us when we don't win the Super Bowl. As far as I'm concerned, he [Obama] would've invited Arizona if they had won." Harrison had also skipped the team's visit after winning Super Bowl XL when George W. Bush was president.

=== Arrest ===
Harrison was arrested in March 2008 and was charged with simple assault and criminal mischief stemming from a domestic altercation with his girlfriend, Beth Tibbott. On April 3, 2008, the district attorney dropped all charges because Harrison had completed anger management counseling and psychological counseling.

The arrest gained some controversy after the team released wide receiver Cedrick Wilson in a similar, but unrelated, incident around the same time but did not release Harrison. The Steelers even issued a press release shortly after they released Wilson stating that Harrison's incident and Wilson's incident were examined "on a case-by-case basis" and Wilson's incident determined that his warranted release while Harrison had "taken responsibility for his actions." Steelers owner Dan Rooney, a lifelong devout Catholic, added that the incident was concerning their son's baptism, that Harrison's girlfriend reportedly did not want their son baptized, and that Harrison promptly called the Rooney family about the incident. Nonetheless, there were still accusations of a double standard because of the timing of both Harrison's and Wilson's incidents. The NFL, which had been cracking down on off-the-field conduct, took no action in either incident.

=== Dog incident ===
On May 23, 2009, Harrison's son, James III, sustained an injury to his thigh when the family's pit bull became agitated and bit him. The boy's mother, Beth Tibbott, who had let the dog out of his cage, was also bitten when she tried to intervene. The dog also bit the player's massage therapist, who needed three stitches. Harrison's agent, William Parise, said the boy's injuries were "serious but certainly not life-threatening." Three days later, James III was released from the hospital. The pit bull was scheduled to be euthanized but, through the team, Harrison was able to place the dog in a temporary home which specializes in training aggressive dogs.

=== Men's Journal article ===
On July 13, 2011, a controversial magazine article titled "James Harrison: Confessions of an NFL Hitman" was published by Paul Solotaroff in Men's Journal. In the article, Harrison was asked multiple questions about who he is and why he plays the game of football the way he does. The controversy comes into play when Harrison begins talking about the NFL commissioner Roger Goodell. Harrison called Goodell a "crook and a puppet", and then proceeded to say that, "I hate him and will never respect him." Harrison also made comments towards his quarterback, Ben Roethlisberger, and other players in the National Football League such as Brian Cushing. Harrison released an apology for his statements on July 14, 2011.

== Deebo & Joe ==
In 2025, Harrison began co-hosting the podcast Deebo & Joe alongside former NFL player Joe Haden. The podcast features the two former players discussing NFL news, notable plays, current events, and their experiences in professional football, as well as topics involving culture and life outside of football.
