= Ed Westfall (American football) =

American football player (1909–1968)

No. 12, 47
- Position: Quarterback / Running back

Personal information
- Born: November 8, 1909; Salem, Oregon, U.S.
- Died: March 21, 1968 (aged 58); Canton, Ohio, U.S.
- Listed height: 5 ft 9 in (1.75 m)
- Listed weight: 170 lb (77 kg)

Career information
- College: Ohio Wesleyan

Career history
- Boston Braves/Redskins (1932–1933); Pittsburgh Pirates (1933)

Awards and highlights
- Ohio Wesleyan Athletics Hall of Fame (1965)

Career statistics
- Passing attempts: 35
- Passing completions: 9
- Completion percentage: 25.7%
- TD–INT: 1–6
- Passing yards: 133
- Passer rating: 12.9
- Rushing yards: 103
- Rushing touchdowns: 1
- Stats at Pro Football Reference

Edgar Ralph Westfall (November 8, 1909 – March 21, 1968) was an American football quarterback and running back in the National Football League (NFL) for the Boston Braves/Redskins and the Pittsburgh Pirates. He played college football at Ohio Wesleyan University.
