= Don Rhodes =

American football player (1909–1968)

Donald Nelson Rhodes

No. 43
- Position: Tackle

Personal information
- Born: July 9, 1909; Hollidaysburg, Pennsylvania, U.S.
- Died: January 1, 1968 (aged 58)
- Listed height: 6 ft 2 in (1.88 m)
- Listed weight: 225 lb (102 kg)

Career information
- College: Washington & Jefferson College

Career history
- Pittsburgh Pirates (1933)
- Stats at Pro Football Reference

Donald Nelson Rhodes (July 9, 1909 — January 1, 1968) was an American professional football player for the Pittsburgh Pirates of the National Football League (NFL). He attended Allentown Prep in Allentown, Pennsylvania. He attended Washington & Jefferson College.

== Notes ==
- Career statistics from NFL.com · Pro Football Reference ·
