= Ollie Satenstein =

American football player and coach

No. 33
- Positions: Guard, end, tackle, center

Personal information
- Born: May 1, 1906; Massachusetts, U.S.
- Died: May 1, 1959 (aged 53); Yonkers, New York, U.S.
- Listed height: 6 ft 0 in (1.83 m)
- Listed weight: 213 lb (97 kg)

Career information
- High school: Cushing (Ashburnham, Massachusetts)
- College: NYU

Career history
- Staten Island Stapletons (1929–1932); New York Giants (1933); Brooklyn Dodgers (1934)*; Mount Vernon Cardinals (1936)
- * Offseason or practice squad member only
- Stats at Pro Football Reference

Bernard Oliver Satenstein (c. 1906 – May 1, 1959) was an American football player who five seasons in the National Football League (NFL) with the Staten Island Stapletons and New York Giants. He played college football at New York University and attended Cushing Academy in Ashburnham, Massachusetts. He was also a coach at Mount Vernon High School in Mount Vernon, New York. Satenstein died as a result of a heart attack.
