= Ken Strong =

American football player (1906–1979)

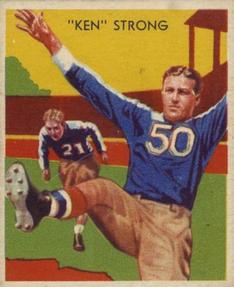

No. 2, 11, 50, 30
- Positions: Halfback, fullback

Personal information
- Born: April 21, 1906; West Haven, Connecticut, U.S.
- Died: October 5, 1979 (aged 73); New York, New York, U.S.
- Listed height: 6 ft 0 in (1.83 m)
- Listed weight: 206 lb (93 kg)

Career information
- High school: West Haven
- College: NYU

Career history

Playing
- Staten Island Stapletons (1929–1932); New York Giants (1933–1935); New York Yankees (1936–1937); Jersey City Giants (1938); New York Giants (1939); Jersey City Giants (1940); New York Giants (1944–1947)

Coaching
- NYU (1937) Assistant coach; Jersey City Giants (1938) Head coach; New York Giants (1962–1965) Kicking coach

Awards and highlights
- NFL champion (1934); 4× First-team All-Pro (1930–1931, 1933–1934); NFL scoring leader (1933); NFL 1930s All-Decade Team; New York Giants Ring of Honor; New York Giants No. 50 retired; 19th greatest New York Giant of all-time; Consensus All-American (1928); First-team All-Eastern (1928)

Career statistics
- Rushing yards: 2,572
- Rushing attempts: 689
- Rushing average: 3.7
- Rushing touchdowns: 24
- Receiving yards: 568
- Receptions: 42
- Yards per reception: 13.5
- Receiving touchdowns: 7
- Games played: 131
- Stats at Pro Football Reference
- Pro Football Hall of Fame
- College Football Hall of Fame

Elmer Kenneth Strong (April 21, 1906 – October 5, 1979) was an American professional football player who was a halfback and fullback. He also played minor league baseball. Considered one of the greatest all-around players in the early decades of the game, he was inducted into the College Football Hall of Fame in 1957 and the Pro Football Hall of Fame in 1967 and was named to the NFL 1930s All-Decade Team.

A native of West Haven, Connecticut, Strong played college baseball and football for the NYU Violets. In football, he led the country in scoring with 162 points in 1928, gained over 3,000 yards from scrimmage, and was a consensus first-team selection on the 1928 College Football All-America Team.

Strong played professional football in the National Football League (NFL) for the Staten Island Stapletons (1929–1932) and New York Giants (1933–1935, 1939, 1944–1947), and in the second American Football League (AFL) for the New York Yankees (1936–1937). He led the NFL in scoring in 1934 and was selected as a first-team All-Pro in 1930, 1931, 1933, and 1934. He also played minor league baseball from 1929 to 1931, but his baseball career was cut short by a wrist injury.

== Early life ==
Strong was born in the Savin Rock section of West Haven, Connecticut, in 1906. His father Elmer F. Strong was a Connecticut native who worked as an egg and dairy inspector. Strong attended West Haven High School where he was a star baseball and football player.

== New York University ==
Strong next attended New York University (NYU) where he played baseball and football. In baseball, he was NYU's center fielder for three years and drew attention for his fielding and power hitting. He played summer baseball for the Hyannis town team of Barnstable, Massachusetts in the Cape Cod Baseball League, and was part of a "parade of sluggers" that powered the Hyannis lineup.

As a halfback for the 1928 NYU Violets football team, he led the country in scoring with 162 points, tallied some 3,000 total yards from scrimmage, and was a consensus pick on the 1928 College Football All-America Team.

Strong gained widespread fame when he led NYU to a 27–13 upset victory over undefeated Carnegie Tech. He threw two long touchdown passes, rushed for two touchdowns, and kicked three extra points, leading Grantland Rice to write:

This attack was led by a runaway buffalo, using the speed of a deer, and his name was Ken Strong. He ran all over a big, powerful team, smashed its line, ran its ends, kicked 50 and 55 yards, threw passes and tackled all over the lot. Today he was George Gipp, Red Grange and Chris Cagle rolled into one human form and there was nothing Carnegie Tech had that could stop his march.

Carnegie Tech coach Walter Steffen said of Strong's performance: "This is the first time in my career that one man was good enough to run over and completely wreck an exceptionally good team. I can tell you he is better than Heston or Thorpe."

== Professional sports ==
=== Football ===
Strong played 16 seasons of professional football from 1929 to 1940 and 1944 to 1947. He earned a reputation as a triple-threat man and a versatile athlete who played on offense and defense and in the kicking game. The Pro Football Hall of Fame's biography of Strong states: "Strong could do everything – run, block, pass, catch passes, punt, placekick, and play defense with the very best."

==== Staten Island Stapletons ====
Unable to reach terms with the New York Giants, Strong signed instead with the Staten Island Stapletons. He played for the Stapletons for four years from 1929 to 1932. While statistics are not available for the 1929 NFL season, Strong was regarded as one of the best backs in the NFL. He started all 10 games at halfback for the 1929 Stapletons. In his first NFL game, he threw a long forward pass to set up the Stapleton's first touchdown and scored all of the team's 12 points on two short touchdown runs. He also had a 70-yard run in a scoreless tie with the Orange Tornadoes on November 3, 1929. Two days later, Strong had a 50-yard touchdown run against the Providence Steam Roller. At the end of the 1929 season, Strong was selected by Collyer's Eye and the Green Bay Press-Gazette as a second-team All-Pro.

In 1930, Strong appeared in all 12 games for the Stapletons and scored 53 points on two rushing touchdowns, five receiving touchdowns, one field goal, and eight extra points. His point total ranked third in the NFL in 1930, trailing only Jack McBride (56 points) and Verne Lewellen (54 points). On September 28, 1930, he caught two touchdown passes, threw a 40-yard pass that set up a third touchdown, and kicked three extra points in a 21–0 victory over the Frankford Yellow Jackets. In December 1930, he led the Stapletons to a 16–7 victory over the New York Giants for the pro football championship of New York City; Strong accounted for all 16 Stapleton points, running 98 yards for a touchdown, passing for a second touchdown, and kicking a field goal and an extra point. He was selected as a first-team player on the 1930 All-Pro Team by Collyer's Eye and the Green Bay Press-Gazette.

In 1931, Strong appeared in all 11 games for the Stapletons and scored 53 points on six rushing touchdowns, one punt return for a touchdown, two field goals, and five extra points. His 53 points ranked fourth in the NFL, trailing only Johnny Blood (84 points), Ernie Nevers (66 points), and Dutch Clark (60 points). On November 22, 1931, Strong scored all 16 points in a 16–7 victory over Cleveland; he had two rushing touchdowns, including a 50-yard run and kicked a field goal and an extra point. At the end of the 1931 season, Strong was selected as an All-Pro for the second year in a row, receiving first-team honors from the United Press (UP) and Collyer's Eye.

Strong's output dropped off in 1932 as he moved to the fullback position. He appeared in 11 games and ranked sixth in the NFL with 375 rushing yards, but scored only 15 points on two touchdowns and three extra points. At the end of the 1932 season, the Stapletons team folded.

==== New York Giants ====
In 1933, Strong signed with the New York Giants. The 1932 Giants had compiled a 4–6–2 record, but the 1933 Giants, with Strong at fullback and Harry Newman at quarterback, improved to 11–3 and advanced to the 1933 NFL Championship Game. Strong led the NFL with 64 points in 1933; his points were scored on three rushing touchdowns, two receiving touchdowns, a touchdown on an interception return, five field goals, and 13 extra points. On November 26, 1933, he became the first known player in NFL history to score on a fair catch kick. The 30-yard kick was made at the Polo Grounds in a win against the Green Bay Packers. After the 1933 season, Strong received first-team All-Pro honors from the United Press, Collyer's Eye, and the Green Bay Press-Gazette.

In 1934, Strong again played in every game for the Giants as a fullback. He rushed for 431 yards and scored 56 points (six rushing touchdowns, four field goals, and eight extra points) in the regular season. His greatest fame derives from his role in the Giants' comeback victory over the Chicago Bears in the 1934 NFL Championship Game; Strong scored 17 points for the Giants on a 38-yard field goal, two fourth-quarter touchdowns on runs of 42 and 8 yards, and two extra points. Strong received first-team All-Pro honors in 1934 from the NFL and others.

In 1935, Strong helped lead the Giants to their third consecutive NFL Championship Game. In a 10–7 victory over the Brooklyn Dodgers, he was only able to play a few minutes due to injury, but he still managed to score all of the Giants' points on a 24-yard touchdown run and a 24-yard field goal. Slowed by injury in 1935, he was described as "a celebrated invalid" who "hobbled" from the bench to kick a field goal for the Giants in a 3–0 victory over the Bears on November 17. In the 1935 NFL Championship Game, a 26–7 loss to the Detroit Lions, Strong scored all of the Giants' points on a long touchdown catch and run and the extra point.

==== New York Yankees ====
In August 1936, Strong signed with the New York Yankees of the newly formed second American Football League. Strong's departure from the NFL was the new league's first raid on the NFL. Strong later recalled that Giants owner Jack Mara wanted Strong to accept a pay cut from $6,000 to $3,200; the Yankees agreed to pay him $5,000.

During the 1936 season, Strong earned a reputation as "the best blocker in the game." He also: kicked a field goal and two extra points in a 17–6 victory over Brooklyn on October 14; scored a touchdown and kicked the extra point in a 7–6 victory over Pittsburgh on October 21; and kicked three field goals in a 15–7 win over Cleveland on November 23.

Strong returned to the Yankees in 1937. However, he left the team after three games to assist Mal Stevens in coaching the NYU Violets football team.

==== Jersey City Giants ====
In 1938, Strong was a player and head coach for the Jersey City Giants, the New York Giants' farm team in the American Association. He was barred from playing in the NFL because of his decision to jump to the American Football League in 1936. Tim Mara, owner of the Giants, reportedly negotiated a deal with Strong to play for Jersey City in exchange for which Mara would seek Strong's reinstatement in 1939. He kicked 13 field goals, scored 51 points, and was named to the all-league team. He led the Giants to a 7–1 record and the league championship, scoring 10 points in Jersey City's championship game victory over the Union City Rams.

==== Return to the New York Giants ====
Strong returned to the New York Giants in 1939. He appeared in nine games and scored 19 points on four field goals and seven extra points. Strong is also believed to be the second player (after Mose Kelsch) to have devoted an entire season to placekicking; his 1939 season with the Giants had him playing very little outside of kicks.

In the summer of 1940, Strong became ill with stomach ulcers, underwent emergency surgery, and was hospitalized for four weeks. He said that he intended to return to playing when his health permitted. He played for the Jersey City Giants while recuperating in the fall of 1940, led Jersey City to another league championship, then announced his retirement as a player in November 1940.

He came out of retirement in 1942 to play for the Long Island Clippers, scoring 12 points in four games.

In 1944, with talent in the NFL depleted by wartime military service, Strong returned for a third stint with the New York Giants. He appeared in all 10 games for the 1944 Giants, including six as a starter. In his first three games with the Giants in 1944, Strong at age 38 accounted for 22 of the team's 48 points. He helped lead the team to the 1944 NFL Championship Game, scoring 41 points on six field goals and 23 extra points.

After the war ended, Strong remained with the Giants for another three years as the team's place-kicker and remained one of the league's leading scorers with 41 points in 1945, 44 points in 1946, and 30 points in 1947. His 32 extra points in 1946 ranked second in the league. In April 1948, at age 41, Strong announced his retirement as a player.

==== Overview and honors ====
In 12 seasons in the NFL, Strong received first-team All-Pro honors four times (1930, 1931, 1933, and 1934) and scored 520 career points (including 36 points in the post-season) on 38 touchdowns, 39 field goals, and 175 extra points.

In October 1937, Red Cagle, a member of the College Football Hall of Fame, rated Strong at the greatest all-around football player. Cagle said: "Strong ... can do everything. He's a great punter, place kicker, pass thrower, and how he could carry his 198 pounds! I played with and against Strong, and he always stood out. He is tops when the chips are down ... Ken is also a brilliant blocker, so I guess that makes him the class."

Walter Steffen, also a member of the College Football Hall of Fame, said: "I'll tell you he is easily the greatest football player I ever saw – and I've been around over twenty-five years ... I can tell you honestly that since 1905 I've never seen a football player in his class for all-around stuff."

In 1939, Grantland Rice rated Strong and Jim Thorpe as the greatest players in football history. In Strong's favor, Rice cited Strong's "unusual speed", the "driving force in his legs", and his stamina.

Harry Grayson wrote: "An amazing runner, blocker, passer, kicker, and defensive man, Strong was, in the opinion of many who saw him, the greatest football player of them all." Grayson later called Strong "a runaway buffalo with the speed of an antelope."

Strong received numerous honors for his football career, including the following:

- In 1950, he was one of the 25 charter inductees into the Helms Athletic Foundation's Professional Football Hall of Fame.
- In 1957, he was inducted into the College Football Hall of Fame.
- In 1967, he was inducted into the Pro Football Hall of Fame.
- Prior to 1968, Strong's jersey number (No. 50) was retired by the New York Giants. He was among the first four Giants (along with Mel Hein, Y. A. Tittle and Al Blozis) to be so honored.
- In 1969, he was named to the NFL 1930s All-Decade Team.
- In 1971, he was inducted into the NYU Athletics Hall of Fame.
- In 2010, he was one of the 22 players included in the New York Giants Ring of Honor at MetLife Stadium.

=== Baseball ===
Strong also played professional baseball for several years. He was signed by the New York Yankees before graduating from NYU and spent the summer of 1929 with the New Haven Profs of the Eastern League. He was an outfielder for New Haven, appearing in 104 games and compiling a .283 batting average with 21 home runs and 43 extra-base hits.

Strong began the 1930 season with New Haven. In mid-May, he joined the Hazleton Mountaineers of the New York–Pennsylvania League, appearing in 117 games and compiling a .373 batting average with 41 home runs (a league record), and 88 extra-base hits. On June 8 in a game at home vs. Wilkes-Barre, Strong played left field and hit four home runs.

In 1931, Strong moved up to AA ball with the Toronto Maple Leafs of the International League. He appeared in 118 games with Toronto and compiled a .340 batting average with 53 extra-base hits.

In January 1932, the Detroit Tigers purchased rights to Strong. He was considered a tremendous major league prospect, but a wrist injury sustained late in the 1931 season when he ran into the outfield fence proved to be a fracture. Strong underwent surgery, but the Detroit surgeon removed the wrong bone. Strong never recovered the full use of his right wrist. In July 1933, Strong won a $75,000 jury verdict in a lawsuit against the surgeon who removed the wrong bone. The verdict was later reversed on appeal.

== Family, later years, and honors ==
In December 1929, Strong married Amelie Hunneman, a New York actress known by the stage name Rella Harrison. The marriage was "stormy", short-lived, and ended in divorce.

In December 1931, Strong married Mabel Anderson of Long Island. Strong and his second wife remained married for nearly 48 years and had a son, Kenneth Robert Strong, born in approximately 1932.

After retiring from football, Strong lived with his wife and son in Bayside, Queens, and worked as a liquor salesman. From 1962 to 1965, he was an assistant coach for the New York Giants, working with the team's kickers.

Strong had a history of heart problems and died of a heart attack in 1979 at age 73.

== Television ==
On February 19, 1957, Strong made an appearance on the game show To Tell the Truth. He was contestant number 3 claiming to be Tommy Loughran, a former boxer.

== See also ==
- List of NCAA major college football yearly scoring leaders
