= Bill Tanguay =

American football player (1909–1971)

- Tanguay with the Pittsburgh Pirates in 1933

No. 42
- Position: Tailback

Personal information
- Born: May 24, 1909; Syracuse, New York, U.S.
- Died: July 11, 1985 (aged 75); Broward County, Florida, U.S.
- Listed height: 6 ft 0 in (1.83 m)
- Listed weight: 190 lb (86 kg)

Career information
- High school: Central (Washington, D.C.)
- College: NYU (1929–1932)

Career history
- Pittsburgh Pirates (1933)
- Stats at Pro Football Reference

James Peter "Bill" Tanguay (May 24, 1909 – March 23, 1971) was an American professional football player who was a tailback for one season with the Pittsburgh Pirates of the National Football League (NFL). He played college football for the NYU Violets.

== Early life and college ==
James Peter Tanguay was born on May 24, 1909, in Syracuse, New York. He attended Central High School in Washington, D.C.

He was a member of the NYU Violets of New York University from 1929 to 1932 and a three-year letterman from 1930 to 1932.

== Professional career ==
Tanguay signed with the Pittsburgh Pirates of the National Football League on August 14, 1933. He played in three games for the Pirates during the team's inaugural 1933 season, completing five of 17 passes (29.4%) for 101 yards, one touchdown, and five interceptions. In a 14–13 victory over the Chicago Cardinals on September 27, 1933, Tanguay scored the game-deciding touchdown in the first win in franchise history. He was released by the Pirates on October 10, 1933.

== Personal life ==
Tanguay died on March 23, 1971, in Broward County, Florida.
