= Angelo Brovelli =

American football player (1910–1995)

No. 29, 14
- Position: Halfback

Personal information
- Born: August 21, 1910; Porterville, California, U.S.
- Died: August 5, 1995 (aged 84); Acampo, California, U.S.
- Listed height: 6 ft 0 in (1.83 m)
- Listed weight: 193 lb (88 kg)

Career information
- High school: Porterville
- College: Saint Mary's

Career history
- Pittsburgh Pirates (1933–1934)

Awards and highlights
- First-team All-American (1932); First-team All-PCC (1932)

Career statistics
- Rushes / yds: 97 / 348
- Receptions / yds: 6 / 137
- Touchdowns: 3
- Stats at Pro Football Reference

Angelo Augustine "Angie" Brovelli (August 21, 1910 – August 5, 1995) was an American football halfback who played for the Pittsburgh Pirates in the National Football League (NFL) in 1933 and 1934.

== Early life and college ==
Brovelli was born in Porterville, California on August 21, 1910. His parents, Carlo and Maria, were Italian immigrants from Lombardia, Italy. Brovelli was the youngest of six siblings born to the couple. He attended Porterville High School where he played on the varsity football team.

In 1928, he graduated and enrolled at Saint Mary's College of California in Moraga, California. While at St. Mary's, he continued to play football, before his graduation in 1932.

== Professional career ==
=== Pittsburgh Steelers ===
Brovelli was hired by team owner Art Rooney ahead of the 1933 NFL season to play in Pittsburgh for the inaugural Pittsburgh Steelers (then called the Pittsburgh Pirates) season. Brovelli stood at six-feet-tall and weighed 193 pounds at the time of his signing with the team.

Though primarily a tailback, Brovelli also acted as both a backup quarterback behind Tony Holm and kicker for the Pirates. In the team's debut season, he scored the team's only touchdown of their Week 3 loss to the Boston Redskins when he ran in a one-yard touchdown late in the game to prevent a shutout with the final score being 21–6. He only scored one more touchdown that season with five yard rush during a 25–6 loss to the Philadelphia Eagles, once again accounting for the team's only points of the game. He also kicked an extra point and completed eight passes on 25 attempts for 112 yards during the season.

In 1934, Brovelli played a shortened season, only appearing in five games with the Pirates. In those five games (all of which he started), Brovelli recorded 112 yards on 37 carries and scored one touchdown. His role had been diminished to purely rushing attacks, relinquishing the quarterback position, now occupied by Warren Heller. His single touchdown of the season came when the Pirates defeated the Eagles in a rematch of the previous season's route with a final score of 9–7. He left the team following the season.

Overall as a starter at the fullback position, he scored three career touchdowns and rushed for 455 yards in total between his two seasons. In addition to his rushing statistics, he caught six passes for 137 yards, all in his rookie season.

== Death ==
After his NFL career ended, Brovelli returned to California. He died in San Joaquin, California on August 5, 1995, five days before his 85th birthday.
