= Jim Kamp =

American football player (1907–1953)

Profile
- Position: Offensive lineman

Personal information
- Born: December 5, 1907; El Reno, Oklahoma, United States
- Died: June 4, 1953 (aged 45)
- Listed height: 6 ft 0 in (1.83 m)
- Listed weight: 210 lb (95 kg)

Career information
- College: Oklahoma City

Career history
- Staten Island Stapletons (1932); Boston Redskins (1933)
- Stats at Pro Football Reference

James Kamp (December 5, 1907 – July 4, 1953) was an American football offensive lineman in the National Football League for the Boston Redskins and Staten Island Stapletons. He played college football at Oklahoma City University.
