= Martin Kottler =

American football player (1910–1989)

Marty "Butch" Kottler

No. 41
- Position: Fullback / Halfback

Personal information
- Born: May 1, 1910; Carnegie, Pennsylvania, U.S.
- Died: June 10, 1989 (aged 79); Centerbrook, Connecticut, U.S.
- Listed height: 5 ft 9 in (1.75 m)
- Listed weight: 180 lb (82 kg)

Career information
- High school: Bellefonte Academy (Bellefonte, Pennsylvania)
- College: Centre College

Career history
- Pittsburgh Pirates (1933)

Career statistics
- Games played: 3
- Touchdowns: 1
- Stats at Pro Football Reference

Martin Albert "Butch" Kottler (May 1, 1910 – June 10, 1989) was an American football running back in the National Football League (NFL). He was a charter member of the Pittsburgh Pirates (which would later be renamed the Steelers).

Kottler was born in Carnegie, Pennsylvania to Martin and Christine (Eichner) Kottler. He attended Centre College in Danville, Kentucky where he starred on the football team and was a member of the Phi Kappa Tau fraternity.

He joined the newly formed Pittsburgh Pirates in 1933. In the club's second game, on September 27, 1933, he scored the first touchdown in franchise history for on a 99-yard interception return. This would stand as the longest interception return in franchise history until Super Bowl XLIII in 2009, when James Harrison returned an interception 100 yards.

During World War II and the Korean War, Kottler served in the United States Army Air Corps. He achieved the rank of captain before leaving the service in 1953. He then embarked on a long career in the auto industry, including many years as an executive at Avis. He was married to Bernice Mary Saunders and the couple had a daughter, Cheryl. He died following a long illness in 1989 at the age of 79.
