= Wuert Engelmann =

American football player (1908–1979)

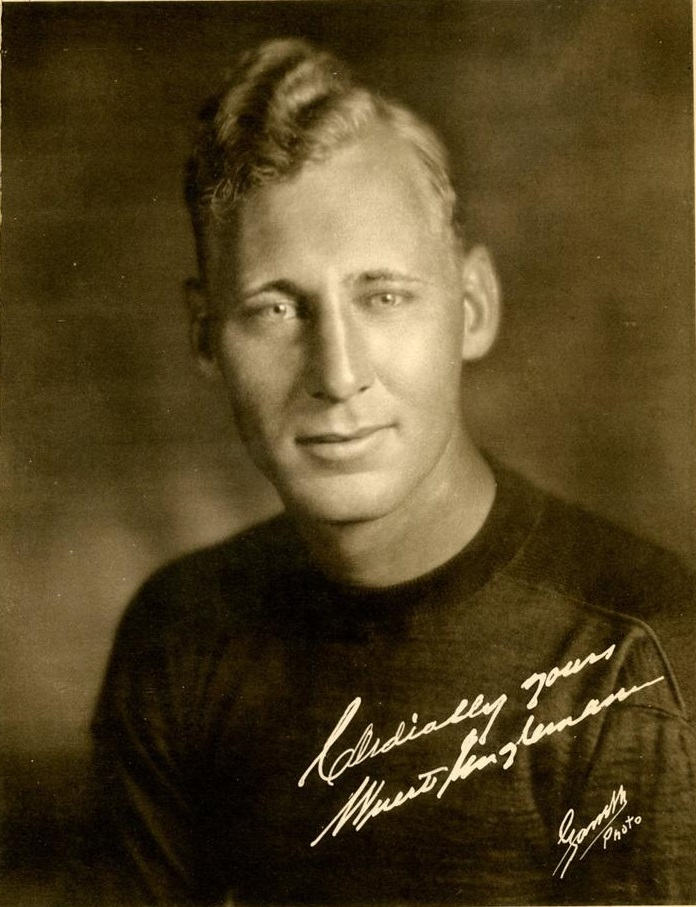

No. 33, 25
- Position: Back

Personal information
- Born: February 11, 1908; Miller, South Dakota, U.S.
- Died: January 8, 1979 (aged 70); Green Bay, Wisconsin, U.S.
- Listed height: 6 ft 3 in (1.91 m)
- Listed weight: 191 lb (87 kg)

Career information
- High school: Miller (South Dakota)
- College: South Dakota State

Career history
- Green Bay Packers (1930–1933)

Awards and highlights
- 2× NFL champion (1930, 1931)

Career statistics
- Rushing attempts: 58
- Rushing yards: 263
- Total touchdowns: 6
- Stats at Pro Football Reference

Wuert Engelmann (also spelled Weert) (February 11, 1908 – January 8, 1979) was an American professional football player who played back for four seasons for the Green Bay Packers. He played college football at South Dakota State University before playing professional football. After his career, he worked for 36 years for the Northern Paper Mill.

== Early life and college ==
Wuert Engelmann was born on February 11, 1908, in Miller, South Dakota, to Weert and Lena Engelmann. The elder Engelmann was a retired farmer and breeder. Wuert attended Miller High School and then South Dakota State University. At South Dakota State, he played varsity football for three years and was team captain for one of those years. He also competed in track and field in college, taking part in three conference championships and barely falling short of qualifying for the United States Olympic decathlon team for the 1928 Summer Olympics.

== Professional career ==
Engelmann played as a back for four seasons for the Green Bay Packers. During his time with the Packers he teamed up with Johnny Blood and was well-known for his speed. He earned the nickname "The South Dakota Jackrabbit" because of his skills for eluding defenders and quickly getting around the edge of the offensive line. Engelmann was released by Packers head coach Curly Lambeau near the end of 1933. During his time with the Packers, Engelmann was part of two NFL Champion teams in 1930 and 1931, with the 1931 victory making the Packers the first team to win three straight championships. Engelmann was inducted into the South Dakota Sports Hall of Fame in 1974. In 1999, Sports Illustrated named Engelmann one of the 50 greatest sports figures from South Dakota.

== Personal life ==
Engelmann married Geraldine (née Gillaume) in 1933. After his football career, he worked for Northern Paper Mill for 36 years. He was a member of the Packers Alumni Association, the local Elks Club and the Woodside Country Club. Engelmann was married and had two children. After a brief illness, he died on January 8, 1979.
