= Larry Critchfield =

American football player (1908–1965)

No. 34
- Position: Guard

Personal information
- Born: January 6, 1908; Ursina, Pennsylvania, U.S.
- Died: June 30, 1965 (aged 57); Confluence, Pennsylvania, U.S.
- Listed height: 5 ft 11 in (1.80 m)
- Listed weight: 195 lb (88 kg)

Career information
- College: Grove City

Career history
- Pittsburgh Pirates (1933); Cincinnati Reds (1934)*
- * Offseason or practice squad member only
- Stats at Pro Football Reference

Lawrence K. Critchfield (January 6, 1908 – June 30, 1965) was an American professional football guard who played one season in the National Football League (NFL) with the Pittsburgh Pirates. He played college football at Grove City College.

== Early life and college ==
Lawrence K. Critchfield was born on January 6, 1908, in Ursina, Pennsylvania. For high school, he attended Beckley College in Harrisburg, Pennsylvania.

Critchfield played college football at Grove City College from 1929 to 1932.

== Professional career ==
Critchfield signed with the Pittsburgh Pirates of the National Football League in 1933. He played in all 11 games, starting ten, as a guard for the Pirates during the team's inaugural 1933 season. The Pirates finished the year with a 3–6–2 record.

On July 1, 1934, Critchfield was traded to the Cincinnati Reds. He was released later in 1934.

== Personal life ==
Critchfield died on June 30, 1965, in Confluence, Pennsylvania.
