= 1933 Brooklyn Dodgers (NFL) season =

Defunct NFL team season

1933 Brooklyn Dodgers season
- Owner: Christ Cagle and John Simms Kelly
- Head coach: Cap McEwan
- Home stadium: Ebbets Field

Results
- Record: 5–4–1
- Division place: 2nd NFL Eastern
- Playoffs: Did not qualify

The 1933 Brooklyn Dodgers season was their fourth in the league. The team improved on their previous season's output of 3–9, winning five games. Despite shutting out five of their opponents, they were also shut out in three games and they failed to qualify for the playoffs for the second consecutive season.

== Schedule ==
Game	Date	Opponent	Result	Record	Venue	Attendance	Recap	Sources
1	October 8	Chicago Bears	**L** 0–10	0–1	Ebbets Field	18,000	Recap	
2	October 15	Cincinnati Reds	**W** 27–0	1–1	Ebbets Field	12,000	Recap	
3	October 22	at **New York Giants**	**L** 7–21	1–2	Polo Grounds	35,000	Recap	
4	October 29	Chicago Cardinals	**W** 7–0	2–2	Ebbets Field	18,000	Recap	
5	November 5	**Pittsburgh Pirates**	**T** 3–3	2–2–1	Ebbets Field	15,000	Recap	
6	November 12	at **Pittsburgh Pirates**	**W** 32–0	3–2–1	Forbes Field	12,000	Recap	
7	November 19	at Chicago Cardinals	**W** 3–0	4–2–1	Wrigley Field	4,000	Recap	
8	November 26	**Boston Redskins**	**W** 14–0	5–2–1	Ebbets Field	15,000	Recap	
9	November 30	**New York Giants**	**L** 0–10	5–3–1	Ebbets Field	28,000	Recap	
10	December 3	at Cincinnati Reds	**L** 0–10	5–4–1	Redland Field	3,500	Recap	
Note: Intra-division opponents are in **bold** text.

== Standings ==
NFL Eastern Division
	W	L	T	PCT	DIV	PF	PA	STK
New York Giants	11	3	0	.786	7–1	244	101	W7
Brooklyn Dodgers	5	4	1	.556	2–2–1	93	54	L2
Boston Redskins	5	5	2	.500	2–3	103	97	T1
Philadelphia Eagles	3	5	1	.375	1–2	77	158	L2
Pittsburgh Pirates	3	6	2	.333	1–5–1	67	208	L3

Note: Tie games were not officially counted in the standings until 1972.
