= Doc Ledbetter =

American football player (1910–1946)

Profile
- Positions: Fullback, halfback

Personal information
- Born: January 25, 1910; Huntsville, Arkansas
- Died: October 22, 1946 (aged 36); Arkansas
- Listed height: 5 ft 10 in (1.78 m)
- Listed weight: 190 lb (86 kg)

Career information
- High school: Springdale (AR)
- College: Arkansas

Career history
- Staten Island Stapletons (1932); Chicago Cardinals (1932–1933)

Career statistics
- Rushing yards: 170
- Receiving yards: 37
- Passing yards: 12
- Stats at Pro Football Reference

Homer Carroll "Doc" Ledbetter (January 25, 1910 – October 22, 1946) was an American football player. He played college football at Arkansas and professional football in the National Football League (NFL) as a fullback and halfback for the Staten Island Stapletons in 1932 and the Chicago Cardinals in 1932 and 1933. He appeared in 17 NFL games, five as a starter. A lieutenant colonel in the Third Army during World War II, Ledbetter was killed in a car accident in 1946.
