= Paul Collins (end) =

American football player (1907–1988)

Profile
- Position: End

Personal information
- Born: October 31, 1907; Danbury, Iowa, U.S.
- Died: September 25, 1988 (aged 80)

Career information
- College: Pittsburgh

Career history
- 1932–1935: Boston Braves/Redskins
- Stats at Pro Football Reference

Paul Andrew Collins (October 31, 1907 – September 25, 1988) was an American football end in the National Football League (NFL) for the Boston Braves/Redskins. He played college football at Pittsburgh.
