= Dick Fishel =

American football player (1909–1972)

Profile
- Position: Back

Personal information
- Born: September 19, 1909; New York, New York
- Died: August 12, 1972 (aged 62); Los Angeles, California
- Listed height: 5 ft 9 in (1.75 m)
- Listed weight: 190 lb (86 kg)

Career information
- High school: Morris (Bronx, New York)
- College: Syracuse

Career history
- Brooklyn Dodgers (1933–1934)

Richard W. Fishel (September 19, 1909 – August 12, 1972) was an American football player.

Fishel was born in New York, New York, in 1909. He played college football as a fullback and quarterback for the Syracuse Orange football teams from 1930 to 1932.

Fishel also played professional football in the National Football League (NFL) as a fullback and wingback for the Brooklyn Dodgers. He appeared in tn NFL games, two as a starter, during the 1933 and 1934 seasons. He had 22 carries for 61 yards and a touchdown. He also completed three of seven passes for 50 yards with one interception. He also played for the Bay Parkway team in 1934.

After his playing career ended, Fishel became a "pioneer in radio and television sports announcing." He later operated an advertising and promotions firm and also served as a director of the North American Hotel Corp. He died in August 1972 at age 52 in Hollywood, Los Angeles, California.
