= Curly Hinchman =

American football player (1907–1968)

- Hinchman in Navy, 1943

Profile
- Positions: Fullback, halfback

Personal information
- Born: November 12, 1907; Illinois
- Died: January 9, 1968 (aged 60); Anderson, Indiana
- Listed height: 5 ft 10 in (1.78 m)
- Listed weight: 190 lb (86 kg)

Career information
- High school: Greenfield (IN)
- College: Butler, New River State

Career history
- Chicago Cardinals (1933–1934); Detroit Lions (1934)

Career statistics
- Rushing yards: 171
- Receiving yards: 27
- Total yards: 198

Hubert Edward "Curly" Hinchman (November 12, 1907 – January 9, 1968) was an American football fullback and halfback. He played college football at Butler and New River State and professional football in the National Football League (NFL) for the Chicago Cardinals (1933–1934) and Detroit Lions (1934).

== Early life ==
Hinchman was born in 1907 in Illinois. He was an all-around athlete at Greenfield High School in Indiana from 1923 to 1927.

== College football ==
Hinchman attended Butler and played football there. He scored 67 points in 1928 to lead all Indiana college football players in scoring. He later attended New River State (now known as West Virginia Tech) and played both football and basketball there. He was an all-state player at Butler in 1928, and at New River State in 1932.

== Professional football ==
Hinchman also played professional football in the National Football League (NFL) as a fullback and halfback for the Chicago Cardinals in 1933 and 1934 and the Detroit Lions in 1934. Detroit coach Potsy Clark rated Hinchman as the second fastest player in the NFL. He appeared in 22 NFL games, six as a starter.

== Later life ==
Hinchman served in the Navy during World War II at the training centers in Norfolk, Virginia, and Memphis, Tennessee. He began as an instructor in radio and later as an athletic instructor in drill, hand-to-hand combat, boxing, and swimming, and as a supervisor in the commando course.

Hinchman also worked as a teacher and coach in high schools. He later worked as a "time study man" for Delco-Remy. He died in Anderson, Indiana, in 1968.
