= Les Molloy =

American football player (1907–1982)

Profile
- Position: Back

Personal information
- Born: December 8, 1907; Minnesota
- Died: July 31, 1982 (aged 74); Downers Grove, Illinois
- Listed height: 6 ft 0 in (1.83 m)
- Listed weight: 197 lb (89 kg)

Career information
- High school: St. Ignatius Prep (IL)
- College: Loyola (IL)

Career history
- Chicago Cardinals (1931–1933)

Career statistics
- Rushing yards: 52
- Receiving yards: 57
- Passing yards: 22

Leslie A. Molloy (December 8, 1907 – July 31, 1982) was an American football player. He played college football at Loyola of Chicago and professional football in the National Football League (NFL) as a back for the Chicago Cardinals from 1931 to 1933. He appeared in 26 NFL games, 13 as a starter.
