= Potsy Jones =

American football player (1909–1990)

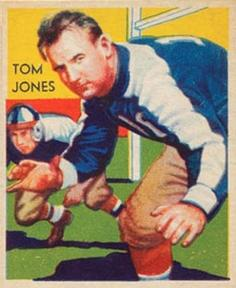

Profile
- Position: Offensive lineman

Personal information
- Born: October 15, 1909; Llewellyn, Pennsylvania, U.S.
- Died: July 3, 1990 (aged 80); Lucama, North Carolina, U.S.
- Listed height: 5 ft 11 in (1.80 m)
- Listed weight: 216 lb (98 kg)

Career information
- College: Bucknell

Career history
- Minneapolis Red Jackets (1930); Frankford Yellow Jackets (1930–1931); New York Giants (1932–1936); Green Bay Packers (1938)

Awards and highlights
- NFL champion (1934)
- Stats at Pro Football Reference

Thomas Clinton "Potsy" Jones (October 15, 1909 – July 3, 1990) was an American football player who played offensive lineman for eight seasons for the Minneapolis Red Jackets, Frankford Yellow Jackets, New York Giants, and Green Bay Packers.
