= Bob Monnett =

American football player (1910–1978)

No. 18, 42, 12, 3, 5, 50
- Position: Halfback

Personal information
- Born: February 27, 1910; Bucyrus, Ohio, U.S.
- Died: August 2, 1978 (aged 68); Galion, Ohio, U.S.
- Listed height: 5 ft 9 in (1.75 m)
- Listed weight: 182 lb (83 kg)

Career information
- College: Michigan State

Career history
- Green Bay Packers (1933–1938)

Awards and highlights
- NFL champion (1936); NFL passing touchdowns leader (1938); Green Bay Packers Hall of Fame; Second-team All-American (1932)
- Stats at Pro Football Reference

Robert C. Monnett (February 27, 1910 – August 2, 1978) was an American professional football player who was a halfback for six seasons with the Green Bay Packers. He was inducted into the Green Bay Packers Hall of Fame in 1973.

Monnett retired following several injuries. Returning to Ohio, he became a sales representative. He died in Galion, Ohio.
