= Benny LaPresta =

American football player (1909–1975)

Profile
- Position: Running back

Personal information
- Born: January 22, 1909; Bellevue, Ohio
- Died: August, 1975 (age 66)

Career information
- College: St. Louis

Career history
- 1933: Boston Redskins
- 1934: Cincinnati Reds
- 1934: St. Louis Gunners

Benjamin LaPresta (January 22, 1909 – August 1975) was an American football running back in the National Football League for the Boston Redskins, the Cincinnati Reds, and the St. Louis Gunners. He played college football at St. Louis University.
