= Butch Gibson =

American football player (1904–1960)

No. 11
- Positions: Guard, tackle

Personal information
- Born: August 7, 1904; Middlebranch, Ohio, U.S.
- Died: May 1, 1960 (aged 55); North Canton, Ohio, U.S.

Career information
- College: Grove City

Career history
- New York Giants (1930–1934)

Awards and highlights
- NFL champion (1934); All-Pro (1931, 1934)

Career statistics
- Games played: 67
- Games started: 45
- Stats at Pro Football Reference

Evans Denver "Butch" Gibson (August 28, 1904 – May 1, 1960) was an American professional football player.

Gibson was born in 1904 on a farm near Middlebranch, Ohio. He attended Central Catholic High School and McKinley High School, both in Canton, Ohio. He was captain of the 1922 McKinley high School football team. He then enrolled at Grove City College in Grove City, Pennsylvania. He played college football for the Grove City Wolverines football teams in 1925 and 1926. He also played basketball for Grove City.

After leaving Grove City, Gibson worked for three years as a teacher and coach in Pennsylvania. During this time, he also played professional football for the Canton Bulldogs and Reogers Jewelers teams.

Gibson also played professional football in the National Football League (NFL) for the New York Giants, principally at the guard position, for five seasons from 1930 to 1934, including the 1934 team that won the NFL championship. He appeared in 67 NFL games for the Giants, 45 of them as a starter. He was selected as an All-NFL player in 1931 and 1934. He was remembered for his "terrific ability to block punts", having blocked as many as two or three a game.

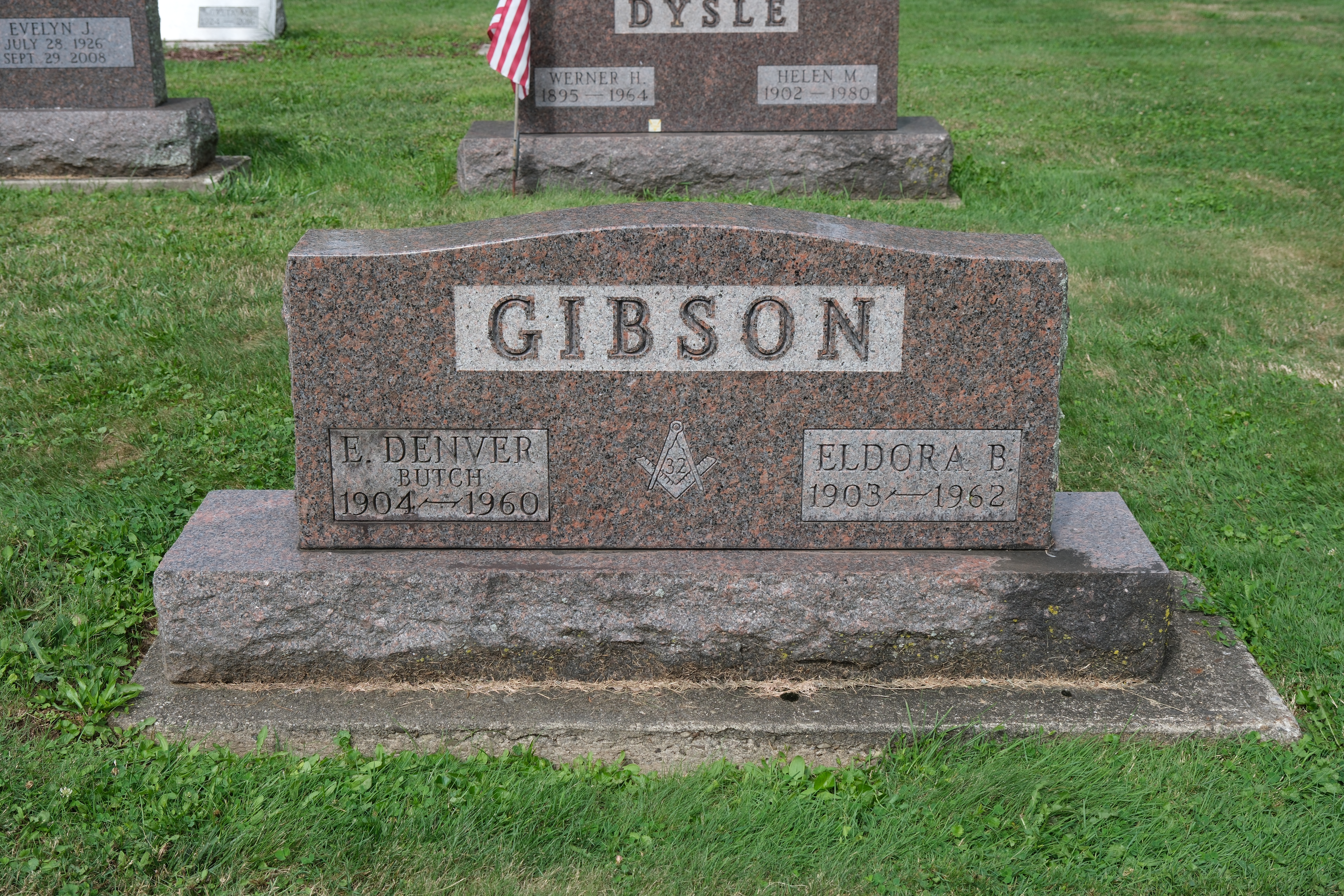
Grave of Gibson at Henry Warstler Cemetery

Gibson was a lifelong resident of Stark County, Ohio. After his football career ended, he worked for 26 years for the Republic Steel Corp., including 16 years as superintendent of the steel-conditioning department. He died from a heart attack in 1960 at age 59. He had recently been released from the hospital and was found dead in his bed at his home in North Canton, Ohio.
