= Tony Holm =

American football player (1908–1978)

No. 23, 18, 36
- Positions: Punter, Quarterback, Running back

Personal information
- Born: May 22, 1908; Birmingham, Alabama, U.S.
- Died: July 15, 1978 (aged 70); Waukegan, Illinois, U.S.
- Listed height: 6 ft 1 in (1.85 m)
- Listed weight: 214 lb (97 kg)

Career information
- High school: Fairfield (Birmingham, AL)
- College: Alabama

Career history
- Providence Steam Roller (1930); Portsmouth Spartans (1931); Chicago Cardinals (1932); Pittsburgh Steelers (1933); Charlotte Bantams (1934)

Awards and highlights
- First-team All-American (1929); 2× All-Southern (1928, 1929)

Career statistics
- TDs-INTs: 2-13
- Passing yards: 406

Bernard Patrick Holm (May 22, 1908 – July 15, 1978), nicknamed Tony Holm, was an American professional football player. In his four seasons in the NFL he played punter and quarterback. In 1933 he became the first quarterback for the now Pittsburgh Steelers. He was born in Birmingham, Alabama. Holm played college football for Wallace Wade's Alabama Crimson Tide football teams, earning All-American honors in 1929. "Wade's big express-train fullback, Tom Holm, is in the south all of what Al Marsters and Chris Cagle are in the east. His greatest game was in a 33–13 loss to Georgia Tech.

== Early life and college ==
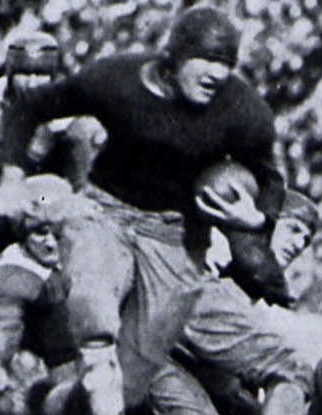
Holm at the University of Alabama in 1928

Holm was born in Birmingham, Alabama, and attended Fairfield High School, where he played the running back position. His athletic performance earned him a place on the University of Alabama's Crimson Tide football team, where he began playing in 1926. At over six feet tall and weighing 214 pounds, Holm was considered physically imposing for a running back of his era. His combination of size and a "high knee action" running style made him difficult to tackle.

In 1929, Alabama began the season with three dominant wins but faced a challenging game against Tennessee, who had defeated the Crimson Tide the previous year. Alabama lost 6-0 in a close contest, with the game's outcome influenced by a blocked punt by Holm. Despite a series of injuries to key players, Holm's strong performances helped the team defeat Kentucky and Georgia Tech later in the season. He finished the year with 1,387 rushing yards, earning All-Southern and All-American honors.

== Professional career ==
After college, Holm pursued a professional football career. He initially signed with the Providence Steamrollers in 1930 before moving to the Portsmouth Spartans the following year. In 1932, Holm joined the Chicago Cardinals. He stayed with the Cardinals until the end of the regular season.

In 1933, Holm became part of the inaugural roster for the Pittsburgh Pirates (now the Steelers), becoming the first quarterback under center in Steelers history. In the Pirates' first game on September 20, 1933, Holm's 65-yard punt set up the team's only points in a 23-2 loss to the New York Giants. The following week, he led the Pirates to a 14-13 victory over his former team, the Chicago Cardinals. Holm played in nine games for the Pirates, passing for 406 yards and rushing for 160 yards before a leg injury ended his season.

Holm briefly served as a player-coach for the Charlotte Bantams of the American Professional Football League in 1934 but resigned after three games, marking the end of his playing career. He would finish his professional career with two touchdowns and 13 interceptions.

== Later life and death ==
After his playing career ended, Holm moved back to the Chicago area. While residing in Illinois, he married his wife, Irene Holm, before becoming a salesman for Sears where he worked until his retirement in 1973. On July 15, 1978, Holm died at his home in Waukegan, Illinois at the age of 70.
