= Mose Kelsch =

American football player (1897–1935)

No. 37
- Positions: Kicker, fullback, halfback

Personal information
- Born: January 31, 1897; Pittsburgh, Pennsylvania, U.S.
- Died: July 13, 1935 (aged 38); Pittsburgh, Pennsylvania, U.S.
- Listed height: 5 ft 10 in (1.78 m)
- Listed weight: 223 lb (101 kg)

Career information
- High school: Bellefonte Academy (Bellefonte, Pennsylvania)
- College: None

Career history
- Pittsburgh Pirates (1933–1934)

Career statistics
- Games played: 16
- Starts: 0
- FG made: 4
- PAT made: 4
- Stats at Pro Football Reference

Christian "Mose" Kelsch (January 31, 1897 – July 13, 1935) was an American football kicker and running back in the National Football League (NFL). He was a charter member of the Pittsburgh Pirates in 1933 — a team which would subsequently be renamed the Steelers.

Kelsch was regarded as a top-level semi-pro player for more than a decade prior to his belated arrival in the NFL at the age of 36, appearing as a member of a variety of teams in the Pittsburgh area.

== Biography ==
=== Sandlot days ===
Mose Kelsch grew up as an orphan in Pittsburgh's Troy Hill neighborhood. He earned the nickname "Mose" while playing sandlot baseball, though no one was able to recall the circumstances that brought the name about. In his younger days, sometimes going by the nickname "Bipp", Kelsch was involved in gang activities in the Pittsburgh North Side Market House district.

He played semi-professional football for many years for Pittsburgh-area sandlot teams in the area, first showing up on the media's radar as a fullback prospect for the popular Northside team Hope-Harvey in 1919, before landing with the Pittsburgh Babcocks.

Kelsch also played baseball in the Pittsburgh Press's Northside Twilight League from the summer of 1920, stationed at third base for the team sponsored by the Northside Board of Trade. His path would cross with a Duquesne University Prep football player named Art Rooney in the fall of 1920 when both became members of the Northside Commercials team. Rooney would long remember the association.

Kelsch would go on to play for a wide range of local teams over the next decade, including the Bradley Eagles, the McKeesport Olympics, the West View Firemen, and the Rooney Majestics — the roster of the last-mentioned would later provide the core for Art Rooney's Pittsburgh Pirates of the National Football League in 1933.

A local journalist waxed poetic about Kelsch's kicking prowess: "Mose could stand back of churning rushlines and kick goals from placement 'til the cows came home. His big right leg would move with the slow rhythm of a grandfather's clock, there would be a thud as his heavy cleated foot would come in contact with the ball — and over the crossbar the pigskin would soar for three points or one, as the case may be."

=== Professional career ===
Mose Kelsch in the 1933 uniform of the Pittsburgh Pirates of the NFL.

At the time he joined the newly formed Pirates in 1933 Kelsch, at 36 years old, was the oldest player in the NFL. Pirates' owner, Rooney, a contemporary on the field from sandlot days, was actually four years his junior. He was also one of the few players in the league at the time who never played college football and listed the "School of Hard Knocks" as his alma mater whenever asked.

By the time of his NFL debut, Kelsch was employed primarily as a placekicker, inserted into the game to convert key field goals and extra points. At a time when tightly limiting substitution rules made such an exclusive function difficult, Kelsch may have been the first such "specialist" in the still-nascent National League. In an NFL career spanning 16 games over two seasons, Kelsch only ran with the ball 11 times, netting just 44 yards — a 4.0 yards per carry average.

A career highlight came on September 27, 1933, when the helmetless Kelsch booted the extra point in the waning moments of the 4th quarter providing the winning margin in a 14–13 victory over the Chicago Cardinals — the first win in Pittsburgh franchise history. The team would win only two more games that year.

=== Death and legacy ===
Off the field, Kelsch was a committed bachelor, characterized in one news account as a "night-clubber, man-about-town, a member of some of the liveliest gangs that ever held sway on the other side of the Allegheny."

On July 13, 1935, Kelsch left his Pittsburgh cafe and turned his car onto the highway heading for his home in Wexford. He was side-swiped by another vehicle, driven by a former teammate with the West View Firemen, Edward A. Jackson. Although Jackson and his wife in the first car were only slightly injured, Kelsch's machine was spun around completely by the collision and he suffered a fractured skull. He died at Allegheny General Hospital four hours later.

Kelsch was 38 years old at the time of his death, with team owner Art Rooney serving as a pall-bearer at his funeral.

Kelsch was eulogized in the Pittsburgh Press as a gritty, working class hero: "In a city where college football is paramount, old Mose won his name. No one every stepped up and handed him a sheepskin. The cheers that greeted him did not come from the throats of undergraduates or old grads, but were voiced in the hoarse tones of the Strip, Soho, Manchester — where the going is always hard and a man has to be a man to get by."

== See also ==
- List of gridiron football players who died during their careers
