= Kink Richards =

American football player (1910–1976)

No. 13
- Position: Halfback

Personal information
- Born: December 27, 1910; Garden Grove, Iowa, U.S.
- Died: July 21, 1976 (aged 65); Los Angeles, California, U.S.
- Listed height: 5 ft 11 in (1.80 m)
- Listed weight: 195 lb (88 kg)

Career information
- High school: Garden Grove (IA)
- College: Simpson (IA)

Career history
- New York Giants (1933–1939)

Awards and highlights
- 2× NFL champion (1934, 1938); NFL All-Star Game (1938); NFL receiving touchdowns co-leader (1933)

Career statistics
- Games played: 73
- Starts: 18
- Carries: 508
- Rushing yards: 1,877 (3.7 average)
- Receptions: 41
- Receiving yards: 535 (13.0 average)
- Receiving touchdowns: 19
- Stats at Pro Football Reference

Elvin C. "Kink" Richards (December 27, 1910 – July 21, 1976) was an American football halfback in the National Football League (NFL) for the New York Giants. He first played college football at the former Baptist school known as Des Moines University (not to be confused with the unrelated current school of the same name) before transferring to Simpson College.

Richards featured on a 1937 New York Football Giants program.
