= 1933 NFL season =

American football season

Regular season
- Duration: September 17 – December 10, 1933
- East Champions: New York Giants
- West Champions: Chicago Bears

Championship Game
- Champions: Chicago Bears

NFL teams: West, East

The 1933 NFL season was the 14th regular season of the National Football League.

Because of the success of the Playoff Game the year before, the league divided its teams into two divisions for the first time, with the winners of each division playing in a Championship Game to determine the NFL Champion.

Three new teams joined the league: the Pittsburgh Pirates, the Philadelphia Eagles, and the Cincinnati Reds. The Boston Braves changed their name to the Boston Redskins and the Staten Island Stapletons left the league, though they continued scheduling games against league teams.

The season ended when the Chicago Bears defeated the New York Giants in the first ever NFL Championship Game.

== Teams ==
The league increased from 8 teams to 10 in 1933.

First season in NFL *	Last active season †

Team	Head coach	Stadium
Boston Redskins	William Dietz	Fenway Park
Brooklyn Dodgers	Cap McEwan	Ebbets Field
Chicago Bears	George Halas	Wrigley Field
Chicago Cardinals	Paul J. Schissler	Comiskey Park
Cincinnati Reds *	Al Jolley & Mike Palm	Crosley Field
Green Bay Packers	Curly Lambeau	City Stadium and Borchert Field
New York Giants	Steve Owen	Polo Grounds
Philadelphia Eagles *	Lud Wray	Baker Bowl
Pittsburgh Pirates *	Forrest Douds	Forbes Field
Portsmouth Spartans	George Clark	Universal Stadium

== Major rule changes ==
Due to the success of the 1932 NFL Playoff Game, the league stopped using the exact rules of college football and started to develop its own revisions:

1. The forward pass is legal anywhere behind the line of scrimmage. Previously, the passer had to be at least five yards back from the scrimmage line. This change is referred to as the "Bronko Nagurski Rule" after his controversial touchdown in the 1932 NFL Playoff Game.
2. Hashmarks or inbounds lines are added to the field 10 yards in from each sideline. All plays would start with the ball on or between the hashmarks.
3. To increase the number of field goals and decrease the number of tie games, the goal posts are moved from the end lines at the back of the end zones to the goal lines (reversing the change made before the 1927 season); the goal posts were moved back to the end line in 1974, where it has remained.
4. It is a touchback when a punt hits the opponent's goal posts before being touched by a player of either team.
5. It is a safety if a ball that is kicked behind the goal line hits the goal posts, and rolls back out of the end zone or is recovered by the kicking team.

== Final standings ==
NFL Eastern Division
	W	L	T	PCT	DIV	PF	PA	STK
New York Giants	11	3	0	.786	7–1	244	101	W7
Brooklyn Dodgers	5	4	1	.556	2–2–1	93	54	L2
Boston Redskins	5	5	2	.500	2–3	103	97	T1
Philadelphia Eagles	3	5	1	.375	1–2	77	158	L2
Pittsburgh Pirates	3	6	2	.333	1–5–1	67	208	L3

Note: Tie games were not officially counted in the standings until 1972.

NFL Western Division
	W	L	T	PCT	DIV	PF	PA	STK
Chicago Bears	10	2	1	.833	7–0	133	82	W4
Portsmouth Spartans	6	5	0	.545	3–4	128	87	L3
Green Bay Packers	5	7	1	.417	2–4	170	107	L1
Cincinnati Reds	3	6	1	.333	2–2	38	110	W1
Chicago Cardinals	1	9	1	.100	1–5	52	101	T1

Note: Tie games were not officially counted in the standings until 1972.

== NFL Championship Game ==
Chicago Bears 23, New York Giants 21

Quarter	1	2	3	4	Total
Giants	0	7	7	7	21
Bears	3	3	10	7	23

at Wrigley Field, Chicago, Illinois

- Date: Sunday, December 17, 1933
- Game time: 1:45 p.m. CST
- Game attendance: "approximately 21,000" to 26,000
- Referee: Tommy Hughitt

Game information
Scoring
- First quarter
  - CHI – FG Jack Manders (16 yards), 3–0 CHI
- Second quarter
  - CHI – FG Manders (40 yards), 6–0 CHI
  - NYG – Red Badgro 29-yard pass from Harry Newman (Ken Strong kick), 7–6 NYG
- Third quarter
  - CHI – FG Manders (15 yards), 9–7 CHI
  - NYG – Max Krause 1 yard run (Strong kick), 14–9 NYG
  - CHI – Bill Karr 8-yard pass from Bronko Nagurski (Manders kick), 16–14 CHI
- Fourth quarter
  - NYG – Strong 8-yard pass from Newman (Strong kick), 21–16 NYG
  - CHI – Karr 31-yard lateral from Bill Hewitt after 3-yard pass from Nagurski to Hewitt (Carl Brumbaugh kick), 23–21 CHI

== Statistical leaders ==
The 1933 season marked the second year in which official statistics were tracked and retained by the NFL. Certain statistics later regarded as staples were not maintained, including interceptions, punting average, kickoff return yardage and average, and field goal percentage, among others. New NFL records are denoted with the ‡ symbol below.

	Name	Team	Yards
Passing	1. Harry Newman	New York Giants	973 ‡
	2. Glenn Presnell	Portsmouth Spartans	774
	3. Arnie Herber	Green Bay Packers	656
Rushing	1. Jim Musick	Boston Redskins	809 ‡
	2. Cliff Battles	Boston Redskins	737
	3. Bronko Nagurski	Chicago Bears	533
Receiving	1. Paul Moss	Pittsburgh Pirates	283
	2. Ray Tesser	Pittsburgh Pirates	282
	3. Bill Hewitt	Chicago Bears	273
Touchdowns	1. Kink Richards	New York Giants	7
	1. Shipwreck Kelly	Brooklyn Dodgers	7
	3. Ken Strong	New York Giants	6
	3. Glenn Presnell	Portsmouth Spartans	6

Source: Pete Palmer, et al. (eds.), The ESPN Pro Football Encyclopedia. First Edition. New York: Sterling Publishing, 2006; p. 1041.

== Coaching changes ==
- Boston Redskins: Lud Wray was replaced by William Dietz.
- Brooklyn Dodgers: Benny Friedman was replaced by Cap McEwen.
- Chicago Bears: To save money, franchise owner George Halas laid off Ralph Jones and took over the head coaching duties.
- Cincinnati Reds: For the Reds' first season in the league, Al Jolley served three games and Mike Palm served seven.
- Chicago Cardinals: Jack Chevigny was replaced by Paul J. Schissler.
- Pittsburgh Pirates: Forrest Douds became the first head coach of the new team.
- Philadelphia Eagles: Lud Wray became the first head coach of the new team.

== Stadium changes ==
- The renamed Boston Redskins moved from Braves Field to Fenway Park.

This was also the first season of selected Green Bay Packers home games in Milwaukee, with the Packers hosting one game in 1933 at Borchert Field. The team would then regularly play two or three home games each year in Milwaukee from 1934 to 1994.
