= 1934 Detroit Lions season =

NFL team season

- Owner: George A. Richards
- General manager: Irving "Cy" Huston
- Head coach: Potsy Clark
- Home stadium: University of Detroit Stadium

Results
- Record: 10–3
- Division place: 2nd NFL Western
- Playoffs: Did not qualify

The 1934 Detroit Lions season was the fifth in franchise history and the first in Detroit, as the team moved from Portsmouth, Ohio, to Detroit after the 1934 season. Under head coach Potsy Clark, the Lions won their first ten games (of which the first seven were shutouts) then lost three straight in an eight-day span to end the season at 10–3. They finished in second place in the NFL Western Division, three games behind the undefeated Chicago Bears. They ranked first in the NFL in scoring defense and second in scoring offense.

Dutch Clark was a consensus All-NFL pick at quarterback and led the league with 1,146 yards of total offense and ranked second in scoring, third in rushing yardage, and fourth in passing yardage. End Harry Ebding led the NFL with 264 receiving yards. The Lions also boasted four of the NFL's leading rushers: Clark (third with 805 yards); Ernie Caddel (sixth with 528 yards); Ace Gutowsky (seventh with 517 yards); and Glenn Presnell (12th with 413 yards). The team's total of 426 rushing yards against Pittsburgh on November 4 remains an NFL single-game record.

The Lions played the NFL's first Thansksgiving day game on November 29, 1934, starting the team's longstanding tradition of hosting Thanksgiving games. The team played its home games at University of Detroit Stadium.

== Schedule ==
Game	Date	Opponent	Result	Record	Attendance	Venue	Recap	Sources
1	September 23	New York Giants	**W** 9–0	1–0	12,000	University of Detroit Stadium	Recap	
2	September 30	**Chicago Cardinals**	**W** 6–0	2–0	18,000	University of Detroit Stadium	Recap	
3	October 7	at **Green Bay Packers**	**W** 3–0	3–0	7,500	City Stadium	Recap	
4	October 14	at Philadelphia Eagles	**W** 10–0	4–0	9,860	Baker Bowl	Recap	
5	October 17	Boston Redskins	**W** 24–0	5–0	12,000	University of Detroit Stadium	Recap	
6	October 21	Brooklyn Dodgers	**W** 28–0	6–0	11,000	University of Detroit Stadium	Recap	
7	October 28	at **Cincinnati Reds**	**W** 38–0	7–0	4,800	Universal Stadium	Recap	
8	November 4	Pittsburgh Pirates	**W** 40–7	8–0	6,000	University of Detroit Stadium	Recap	
9	November 11	at **Chicago Cardinals**	**W** 17–13	9–0	11,000	Wrigley Field	Recap	
10	November 18	**St. Louis Gunners**	**W** 40–7	10–0	15,000	University of Detroit Stadium	Recap	
11	November 25	**Green Bay Packers**	**L** 0–3	10–1	12,000	University of Detroit Stadium	Recap	
12	November 29	**Chicago Bears**	**L** 16–19	10–2	26,000	University of Detroit Stadium	Recap	
13	December 2	at **Chicago Bears**	**L** 7–10	10–3	34,412	Wrigley Field	Recap	
Note: Intra-division opponents are in **bold** text.

== Standings ==
NFL Western Division
	W	L	T	PCT	DIV	PF	PA	STK
Chicago Bears	13	0	0	1.000	8–0	286	86	W13
Detroit Lions	10	3	0	.769	5–3	238	59	L3
Green Bay Packers	7	6	0	.538	4–5	156	112	W1
Chicago Cardinals	5	6	0	.455	4–5	80	84	W1
St. Louis Gunners	1	2	0	.333	0–2	27	61	L2
Cincinnati Reds	0	8	0	.000	0–6	10	243	L8

Note: Tie games were not officially counted in the standings until 1972.

== Move from Portsmouth and preseason ==
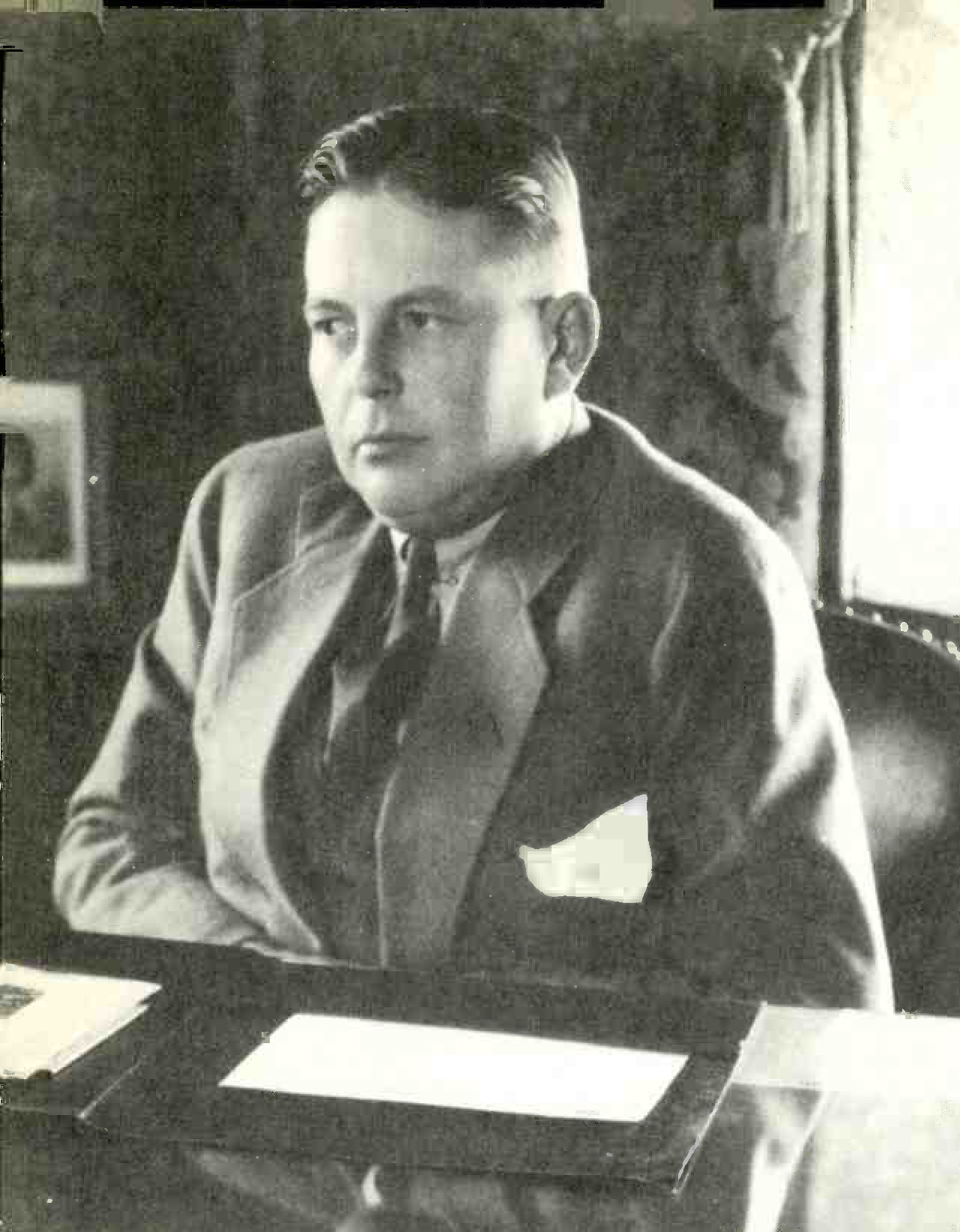
George A. Richards

Prior to 1934, the franchise had played as the Portsmouth Spartans in Portsmouth, Ohio, a city with a 1930 population of 42,560.

In March 1934, a group from Detroit, led by WJR radio owner George A. Richards, purchased the Portsmouth franchise and the rights to all players on its roster, including stars Dutch Clark, Glenn Presnell, George Christensen, and Ox Emerson. Detroit sportsman Irvin (Cy) Huston was appointed as the general manager, owing to "his inttimate knowledge of the game." Huston announced that the University of Detroit Stadium had been secured as the site for the team's home games. He added that negotiations were underway to sign additional players, including the University of Michigan's All-American center Chuck Bernard. Bernard ultimately signed with the club in September.

On April 10, 1934, NFL president Joseph Carr formally presented an NFL franchise to the Detroit investor group at a luncheon at the Detroit Statler Hotel. Huston accepted the franchise from Carr.

Later in April, Huston announced that he had agreed with the New York Giants for the Detroit club's opening game to be played in Detroit on September 23. The game would be a homecoming for the Giants' star quarterback and Detroit native Harry Newman.

On June 9, Huston announced that the team would conduct its early season training at Cranbrook School for the first three weeks of September. Huston noted that Cranbrook had several first class gridirons and a dormitory where the team's training table would be established.

On July 22, Huston announced that the Detroit club would be known as the Lions and would wear blue jerseys with silver for the jersey numbers, helmets, and pants. Asked what shade of blue would be used, Huston replied: "I don't know. They've had me looking at so many blues I'm blue in the face. But anyway, it's the kind of blue, I am told, that will match with silver."

== Game summaries ==
=== Game 1: New York Giants ===
Game 1: New York at Detroit

Team	1	2	3	4	Total
New York Giants	0	0	0	0	0
• Detroit	0	0	3	6	9

- Date: Sept. 23
- Location: Detroit
- Game attendance: 12,000
- Referee: Bob Karns

On September 23, 1934, the Lions opened their first season in Detroit with a 9–0 victory over the New York Giants before a crowd of 12,000 persons at the University of Detroit Stadium. Dutch Clark drop-kicked a field goal from the 20-yard line in the third quarter, and Father Lumpkin intercepted an Ed Danowski pass and returned it 45 yards for the Lions' first touchdown. On offense, the Lions gained 187 yards of total offense, 185 rushing yards and only two passing yards (one completion on three passes). On defense, the Lions held Harry Newman's Giants to 153 yards, 109 rushing and 36 passing (two completions and two interceptions on 18 passes). The Lions fumbled five times in the game and gave up 45 yards on penalties.

The Lions' starting lineup in their first game in Detroit was as follows: Harry Ebding (right end), George Christensen (right tackle), Ox Emerson (right guard), Chuck Bernard (center), Maury Bodenger (left guard), Jack Johnson (left tackle), Bill McKalip (left end), Dutch Clark (quarterback), Ernie Caddell (right halfback), Father Lumpkin (left halfback), and Ace Gutowsky (fullback). Detroit substitutes who appeared in the game were backs Frank Christensen, Glenn Presnell, and Bob Rowe, ends Buster Mitchell and John Schneller, and tackles Sam Knox and Bob Emerick.

=== Game 2: Chicago Cardinals ===
Game 2: Chicago at Detroit

Team	1	2	3	4	Total
Chicago Cardinals	0	0	0	0	0
• Detroit	6	0	0	0	6

- Date: Sept. 30
- Location: Detroit
- Game attendance: 7,000

On September 30, 1934, the Lions defeated the Chicago Cardinals, 6–0, before a crowd of 7,000 at University of Detroit Stadium. Dutch Clark scored on a two-yard touchdown run five minutes into the game; Clark then missed on his drop-kick for the extra point. Father Lumpkin had a key interception to stop a Chicago drive at midfield. The Lions were held to 119 rushing yards in the game. A group of Detroit Tigers, including Mickey Cochrane, Schoolboy Rowe, Elon Hogsett, and Elden Auker, watched the game from a midfield box before the start of the 1934 World Series three days later.

The Lions' starting lineup against the Cardinals was Harry Ebding (right end), George Christensen (right tackle), Ox Emerson (right guard), Chuck Bernard (center), Maury Bodenger (left guard), Jack Johnson (left tackle), Bill McKalip (left end), Dutch Clark (quarterback), Ernie Caddell (right halfback), Father Lumpkin (left halfback), and Frank Christensen (fullback). Detroit substitutes who appeared in the game were backs Ace Gutowsky, Glenn Presnell, Bob Rowe, and Bill McWilliams; ends Buster Mitchell and John Schneller; guards Thomas Hupke and Russ Lay; and center Clare Randolph.

=== Game 3: at Green Bay Packers ===
Game 3: Detroit at Green Bay

Team	1	2	3	4	Total
• Detroit	0	3	0	0	3
Green Bay	0	0	0	0	0

- Date: Oct. 7
- Location: Green Bay
- Game attendance: 8,000
- Referee: Bobby Cahn

On October 7, 1934, the Lions defeated the Green Bay Packers, 3–0, before a crowd of 8,000 at City Stadium in Green Bay, Wisconsin. The only points of the game were scored on a 54-yard field goal kicked from placement by backup quarterback Glenn Presnell. The Green Bay Press-Gazette reported that Presnell's kick was "probably the longest kick for a score in the record" of NFL competition. On offense, the Lions gained 172 total yards, 101 rushing (led by Ace Gutowsky with 54 yards), and 71 passing (five completions out of 22 passes, including a 30-yard gain on a pass from Dutch Clark to Ernie Caddel). On defense, the Lions held the Packers to 123 total yards, 115 rushing and eight passing (two completions and one interceptions on eight passes).

The Lions' starting lineup against the Packers was John Schneller (right end), George Christensen (right tackle), Ox Emerson (right guard), Clare Randolph (center), Maury Bodenger (left guard), Jack Johnson (left tackle), Buster Mitchell (left end), Dutch Clark (quarterback), Ernie Caddell (right halfback), Father Lumpkin (left halfback), and Frank Christensen (fullback). Detroit substitutes who appeared in the game were Bill McKalip (left end), Chuck Bernard (center), Russ Lay (right guard), Ace Gutowsky (left halfback), Glenn Presnell (quarterback), Harry Ebding (end), Ray Richards, Thomas Hupke, and Bob Emerick.

=== Game 4: at Philadelphia Eagles ===
Game 4: Detroit at Philadelphia

Team	1	2	3	4	Total
• Detroit	0	7	0	3	10
Philadelphia	0	0	0	0	0

- Date: Oct. 14
- Location: Philadelphia
- Game attendance: 10,000
- Referee: Tommy Hughitt

On October 14, 1934, the Lions defeated the Philadelphia Eagles, 10–0, before a crowd of 10,000 at the Baker Bowl in Philadelphia. Ernie Caddel ran nine yards for the game's only touchdown in the second quarter, and Dutch Clark drop-kicked the extra point. Caddel also had the longest run of the game at 53 yards. Clark added a field goal from the 25-yard line in the fourth quarter. On offense, the Lions rushed for 145 yards and tallied 36 passing yards (four completions out of 18 passes). On defense, the Lions held the Eagles to 131 rushing yards (80 by Swede Hanson) and five completions on 26 passes for 20 yards.

The Lions' starting lineup against the Eagles was John Schneller (right end), George Christensen (right tackle), Ox Emerson (right guard), Clare Randolph (center), Maury Bodenger (left guard), Jack Johnson (left tackle), Buster Mitchell (left end), Glenn Presnell (quarterback), Ernie Caddell (right halfback), Frank Christensen (left halfback), and Ace Gutowsky (fullback). Detroit substitutes who appeared in the game were McKalip (left end), Emerick (left tackle), Hupke (left guard), Chuck Bernard (center), Richards (right guard), Knox (right tackle), Ebding (right end), Dutch Clark (quarterback), Father Lumpkin (left halfback), Bill McWilliams (right halfback), and Bob Rowe (fullback).

=== Game 5: Boston Redskins ===
Game 5: Boston at Detroit

Team	1	2	3	4	Total
Boston Redskins	0	0	0	0	0
• Detroit	0	3	14	7	24

- Date: Oct. 17
- Location: Detroit
- Game attendance: 12,000
- Referee: Bobbie Cahn

On October 17, 1934, in a Wednesday night game, the Lions defeated the Boston Redskins, 24–0, before a crowd of 12,000 at the University of Detroit Stadium. Dutch Clark began the scoring late in the second quarter with a field goal from the 33-yard line.

At the start of the second half, Father Lumpkin returned the kickoff to Boston's 20-yard line. Frank Christensen scored a touchdown nine plays later on a short run. On the next Detroit drive, the Lions gained 30 yards to Boston's 25-yard line on a pass from Clark to Harry Ebding. After an injury to Father Lumpkin, Ace Gutowsky entered the game and scored a touchdown on a six-yard run.

In the fourth quarter, Ernie Caddel ran around the right end for a 52-yard gain to Boston's five-yard line. Glenn Presnell ran around the left end for the final touchdown. Clark added two extra points on drop-kicks, and Presnell placekicked another. On defense, the Detroit Free Press described the Lions play as "almost flawless". They held a Boston team featuring Cliff Battles to 112 total yards, as the Redskins attempted 16 passes, completed only three and had four passes intercepted.

The Lions' starting lineup against the Redskins was Harry Ebding (right end), George Christensen (right tackle), Ox Emerson (right guard), Clare Randolph (center), Maury Bodenger (left guard), Jack Johnson (left tackle), Bill McKalip (left end), Dutch Clark (quarterback), Ernie Caddell (right halfback), Father Lumpkin (left halfback), and Frank Christensen (fullback). Detroit substitutes who appeared in the game were John Schneller (right end), Glenn Presnell (right halfback), Buster Mitchell (left end), Chuck Bernard (center), Maury Bodenger (left guard), Ace Gutowsky (left halfback), Sam Knox (right tackle), Thomas Hupke (right guard), Bob Emerick (right tackle), Ray Richards (right guard), Bob Rowe (right halfback), and Bill McWilliams (left halfback).

=== Game 6: Brooklyn Dodgers ===
Game 6: Brooklyn at Detroit

Team	1	2	3	4	Total
Brooklyn Dodgers	0	0	0	0	0
• Detroit	0	0	21	7	28

- Date: Oct. 22
- Location: Detroit
- Game attendance: 11,000
- Referee: Robert Karch

On October 22, in a Monday night game, the Lions defeated the Brooklyn Dodgers, 28–0, before a crowd of 11,000 at University of Detroit Stadium. After a scoreless first half, Dutch Clark scored three touchdowns in the third quarter and dropkicked three extra points. Clark's second touchdown came on a 72-yard run. His third touchdown came on a short run which was set up when Frank Christensen intercepted a pass and returned it to Brooklyn's three-yard line. In the fourth quarter, Glenn Presnell substituted for Clark at quarterback and scored a touchdown on a seven-yard run.

The Lions rushed for 257 yards in the game, and the Detroit Free Press credited Father Lumpkin: "Pop Lumpkin, Lion blocking back, clearly demonstrated Monday night that he is as good a blocking back as there is in the business. Pop boxed tackles, blocked ends, blocked for punt handlers and always was in front of the play in the secondary. Pop was in front of Clark clearing the way on every one of Dutch's brilliant runs."

On defense, the Lions held the Dodgers (featuring Shipwreck Kelly) to 56 rushing yards, and the Dodgers' leading passer Chris Cagle was unable to complete a single pass. As a team, the Dodgers completed one of 10 passes for five yards and had four passes intercepted by the Lions. A fight in the fourth quarter between Buster Mitchell and Ollie Sansen resulted in the ejection of both players.

The Lions' starting lineup against the Dodgers was John Schneller (right end), George Christensen (right tackle), Ox Emerson (right guard), Clare Randolph (center), Thomas Hupke (left guard), Jack Johnson (left tackle), Buster Mitchell (left end), Dutch Clark (quarterback), Ernie Caddell (right halfback), Father Lumpkin (left halfback), and Frank Christensen (fullback). Detroit substitutes who appeared in the game were Harry Ebding (right end), Bill McKalip (left end), Maury Bodenger (left guard), Chuck Bernard (center), Glenn Presnell (right halfback), Ace Gutowsky (fullback), Sam Knox (right tackle), Bob Emerick (left tackle), Bob Rowe (left halfback), and Bill McWilliams (right halfback).

=== Game 7: at Cincinnati Reds ===
Game 7: Detroit at Cincinnati

Team	1	2	3	4	Total
• Detroit	3	10	19	6	38
Cincinnati	0	0	0	0	0

- Date: Oct. 28
- Location: Portsmouth, Ohio
- Game attendance: 5,000
- Referee: C. K. Rebele

On October 28, 1934, the Lions defeated the Cincinnati Reds, 38–0, before a crowd of 5,000 in Portsmouth, Ohio. The game was described as a "home coming" for the Lions who had played in southern Ohio as the Portsmouth Spartans one year earlier. Led by Father Lumpkin's blocking, the Lions rushed for 373 yards. The Lions outgained the Reds by 485 yards (373 rushing and 112 passing) to 81 (60 rushing and 21 passing). Dutch Clark scored two touchdowns and kicked a field goal. Glenn Presnell scored a touchdown and kicked a field goal, and additional touchdowns were scored by Lumpkin and Ace Gutowsky. The Lions intercepted four Cincinnati passes, but were penalized six times for 60 yards.

The Lions' victory over the Reds extended the team's streak of shutout victories to seven games, tying an NFL record set by the 1921 Akron Pros. The record has not been matched since 1934.

The Lions' starting lineup against the Reds was Harry Ebding (right end), George Christensen (right tackle), Ox Emerson (right guard), Clare Randolph (center), Maury Bodenger (left guard), Jack Johnson (left tackle), Bill McKalip (left end), Dutch Clark (quarterback), Ernie Caddell (right halfback), Father Lumpkin (left halfback), and Ace Gutowsky (fullback). Detroit substitutions included ends Buster Mitchell and John Schneller, guards/tackles Sam Knox, Ray Richards and Bob Emerick, and backs Frank Christensen, Glenn Presnell, and Bill McWilliams.

=== Game 8: Pittsburgh Pirates ===
On November 4, 1934, the Lions defeated the Pittsburgh Pirates, 40–7. Ernie Caddel scored three touchdowns for the Lions. The Lions tallied 566 yards of total offense in the game, including 426 rushing yards. The Pirates scored the first points allowed by the Lions in the 1934 season—a 62-yard touchdown pass from Harp Vaughan to Joe Skladany on a fake punt in the first quarter.

The Lions' tally of 426 yards against the Pirates remains an NFL team record for most rushing yards in a game.

=== Game 9: at Chicago Cardinals ===
Game 9: Detroit at Chicago Cardinals

Team	1	2	3	4	Total
• Detroit	7	3	7	0	17
Chicago	0	0	0	13	13

- Date: Nov. 11
- Location: Wrigley Field
- Game attendance: 7,500
- Referee: Bobby Cahn

On November 11, 1934, the Lions defeated the Chicago Cardinals, 17–13, before 7,500 specatators at Wrigley Field in Chicago. The Lions jumped out to 17–0 lead, lost momentum when Dutch Clark left the game in the second quarter with an ankle injury, and survived a comeback in which the Cardinals scored 13 unanswred points.

The Lions' starting eleven in the game were McKalip and Schneller at end; Johnson and G. Christensen at tackle; Bodenger and Emerson at guard; Randolph at center, Clark at quarterback; Lumpkin at left halfback; Ebding at right halfback; and F. Christensen at fullback.

=== Game 10: St. Louis Gunners ===
Game 10: St. Louis at Detroit

Team	1	2	3	4	Total
St. Louis	0	0	7	0	7
• Detroit	14	13	6	7	40

- Date: Nov. 18
- Location: Detroit
- Game attendance: 13,000

On November 18, 1934, the Lions defeated the St. Louis Gunners, 40–7, before a crowd of 13,000 in Detroit. The net proceeds of the game were donated to the Goodfellows' Fund. With Dutch Clark sidelined due to injury, Glenn Presnell assumed control of the offense. On defense, ends Harry Ebding and John Schneller were credited with bottling up the St. Louis offense.

The Lions' starting lineup against St. Louis was Mitchell and Schneller at end; Johnson and G. Christensen at tackle; Bodenter and Emerson at guard; Bernard at center; Presnell at quarterback; Lumpkin at left halfback; Caddel at right halfback; and Gutowsky at fullback.

=== Game 11: Green Bay Packers ===
Game 11: Green Bay at Detroit

Team	1	2	3	4	Total
• Green Bay	0	0	0	3	3
Detroit	0	0	0	0	0

- Date: Nov. 25
- Location: Univ. of Detroit Stadium

On November 25, 1934, the Lions lost to the Green Bay Packers, 3–0, in front of a crowd of 12,000 spectators in Detroit. Neither team scored in the first three quarters. Clarke Hinkle kicked a 38-yard field goal in the fourth quarter.

The Lions' starting lineup against the Packers was Harry Ebding (right end), George Christensen (right tackle), Ox Emerson (right guard), Clare Randolph (center), Maury Bodenger (left guard), Jack Johnson (left tackle), Bill McKalip (left end), Glenn Presnell (quarterback), Ernie Caddell (right halfback), Father Lumpkin (left halfback), and Frank Christensen (fullback).

=== Game 12: Chicago Bears ===
Game 13: Chicago at Detroit

Team	1	2	3	4	Total
• Chicago Bears	0	7	6	6	19
Detroit	7	9	0	0	16

- Date: Nov. 29
- Location: Detroit
- Game attendance: 26,000
- Referee: Cahn

Thanksgiving Day 1934

On Thanksgiving Day, November 29, 1934, the Lions lost to the Chicago Bears, 19–16, before a record crowd of 26,000 at University of Detroit Stadium. With the victory, the Bears secured the NFL Western Division championship over the second-place Lions.

Detroit took a 16 to 7 lead at halftime, as Ace Gutowsky scored two touchdowns, Dutch Clark kicked an extra point, and Glenn Presnell kicked a 34-yard field goal. The Bears scored on two field goals by Jack Manders in the third quarter. The winning score followed Joe Zeller's fourth-quarter interception of a Glenn Presnell pass that was returned to Detroit's four-yard line. Bronko Nagurski threw a game-winning touchdown pass to Bill Hewitt. The Lions rushed for 201 yards in the game and held the Bears to 116 rushing yards.

The Lions' starting lineup against the Bears was John Schneller (right end), George Christensen (right tackle), Ox Emerson (right guard), Chuck Bernard (center), Sam Knox (left guard), Jack Johnson (left tackle), Buster Mitchell (left end), Dutch Clark (quarterback), Ernie Caddell (right halfback), Father Lumpkin (left halfback), and Ace Gutowsky (fullback). Detroit substitutions included Curly Hinchman, Bob Rowe, Glenn Presnell, Harry Ebding, Bill McKalip, Clare Randolph, Maury Bodenger, Bob Emerick, and Ray Richards.

=== Game 13: at Chicago Bears ===
Game 13: Detroit at Chicago

Team	1	2	3	4	Total
Detroit	0	0	0	7	7
• Chicago Bears	7	3	0	0	10

- Date: Dec. 2
- Location: Wrigley Field
- Referee: Cahn

On Sunday, December 2, 1934, the Lions lost again to the Bears, this time by a 10–7 score at Wrigley Field in Chicago. In the first quarter, Chicago's George Musso blocked a Dutch Clark punt, and the Bears took over at Detroit's 27-yard line. Bronko Nagurski scored a touchdown, and Jack Manders kicked the extra point. Manders added a field goal in the second quarter. In the fourth quarter, Glenn Presnell ran 33 yards for a touchdown and kicked the extra point.

The Lions' starting lineup against the Bears was Harry Ebding (right end), Bob Emerick (right tackle), Sam Knox (right guard), Chuck Bernard (center), Ox Emerson (left guard), George Christensen (left tackle), Bill McKalip (left end), Dutch Clark (quarterback), Ernie Caddell (right halfback), Curly Hinchman (left halfback), and Ace Gutowsky (fullback).

== Roster ==
Harry Ebding

Ace Gutowsky

Clare Randolph

1934 Detroit Lions final roster
Backs: 1 Ernie Caddel RB/CB; 2 Frank Christensen FB/LB; 7 Dutch Clark RB/S/K; 5 Ace Gutowsky FB/LB; 6 Curly Hinchman RB/CB; 4 Father Lumpkin RB/CB; 3 Glenn Presnell RB/CB/S/K; 8 Bob Rowe RB/CB/S	Ends: 11 Harry Ebding; 10 Bill McKalip; 13 Buster Mitchell; 12 John Schneller	Linemen: 27 Chuck Bernard C/MG; 19 Maury Bodenger G/DG; 14 George Christensen T/DT; 18 Bob Emerick T/DT; 20 Ox Emerson G/DG; 22 Tom Hupke G/DG; 16 Jack Johnson T/DT; 21 Sam Knox G/DG; 17 Clare Randolph C/MG; 25 Ray Richards G/T/DG/DT; rookies in italics

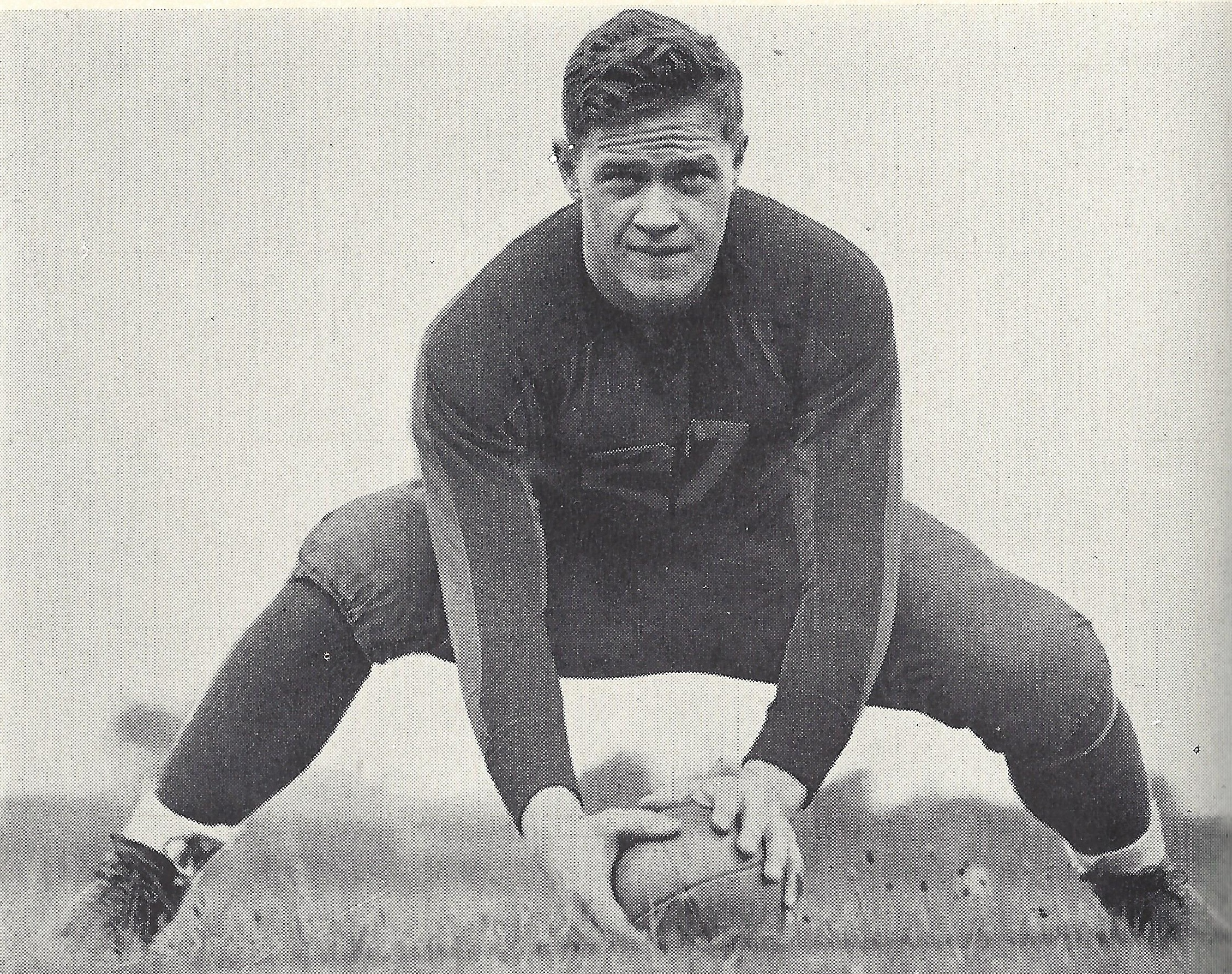
Chuck Bernard

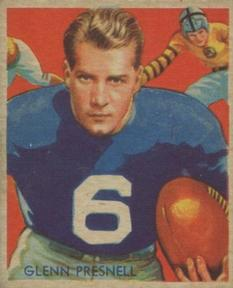
Glenn Presnell

== Statistics, records, and awards ==
=== Team statistics and records ===
The Lions had the best defense in the NFL in 1934, giving up only 59 points in 13 games, for an average of 4.5 points per game. The Lions began the 1934 season with seven consecutive shutouts. In those seven games, the Lions held opponents to 835 yards, an average of 119 yards per game, and outscored opponents by a total of 118 to 0.

Offensively, the Lions ranked second in the NFL with:

- 238 points scored, trailing only the Chicago Bears who scored 286 points;
- 3,510 yards on the ground, again trailing only the Bears who tallied 3,750 yards (both teams surpassing the prior NFL record of 3,029 yards set by the Bears in 1933);
- .769 winning percentage, as the Bears and the Lions were the only teams with winning percentages above .615.

=== Individual statistics ===
Dutch Clark

Quarterback Dutch Clark was a triple-threat man who led the team's offense. He ranked first in the NFL in total offense (1,146 yards), second in scoring (73 points on eight touchdowns, 13 extra points, and four field goals), third in rushing yardage (763), and fourth in passing yardage (383). In the two-way football of the 1930s, Clark also played on defense at what is now known as the safety position.

Other Lions who ranked among the league leaders included:

- End Harry Ebding led the NFL with 264 receiving yards.
- Halfback Glenn Presnell ranked third in the NFL in scoring with 63 points on seven touchdowns, nine extra points, and four field goals.
- Ernie Caddel, Ace Gutowsky, and Presnell ranked sixth, seventh, and twelfth in rushing yardage with 528, 517, and 413 yards, respectively.

=== All-NFL honors ===
Tackle George Christensen

The coaches of the nine NFL teams selected two squads for the Associated Press, which selections are regarded as the official All-NFL team. Two Lions received first-team honors: quarterback Dutch Clark and tackle George Christensen. Four others received second-team honors: end Harry Ebding; end Bill McKalip; fullback Ace Gutowsky; and guard Ox Emerson.

Another all-star NFL eleven, compiled by the United Press through a poll of sports writers, designated three Lions as first-team players: quarterback Dutch Clark; guard Ox Emerson; and end Buster Mitchell. Two Lions also received second-team honors: end Bill McKalip; tackle George Christensen; and halfback Glenn Presnell.

The Green Bay Press-Gazette, in an all-star team compiled with input of NFL coaches and officials, chose three Lions: Clark as the first-team quarterback; McKalip as a first-team end; and George Christensen as a second-team tackle.

Collyer's Eye gave first-team honors to Clark, Emerson, and George Christensen. the Chicago Daily News gave first-team honors to Clark and Emerson and second-team honors to McKalip and Presnell.
