= 1933 Portsmouth Spartans season =

NFL team season

- Owner: Portsmouth National League Football Corporation
- General manager: Harry N. Snyder
- Head coach: Potsy Clark
- Home stadium: Spartan Field

Results
- Record: 6–5
- Division place: 2nd NFL Western
- Playoffs: Did not qualify

The 1933 Portsmouth Spartans season was their fourth in the National Football League (NFL) and final season before the franchise was sold and moved to Michigan to become the Detroit Lions. The team went 6–5 (.545), failing to improve on their previous season's output of 6–2–4 (.750).

Portsmouth failed to qualify for the playoffs.

== Schedule ==
The Spartans started out fast with a 5–1 mark, just a half-game behind the first place Bears (5–0). After splitting their next two contests, Portsmouth (at 6–2) was still within half a game of Chicago (6–1–1). But the Spartans would lose their next three games, including back-to-back defeats to the Bears to close the season.

The Spartans were sold and headed north for the 1934 season, becoming the Detroit Lions. Ironically, the team would return for one last game at Spartan Field when the Lions' October 28 contest against failing Cincinnati Reds franchise was moved from the Queen City to Portsmouth; Detroit won, 38–0, in the last NFL game played in the small Ohio town.

Game	Date	Opponent	Result	Record	Venue	Attendance	Recap	Sources
—	September 13	at Indianapolis Indians	**W** 19–0	—	Perry Stadium	2,206	—	
1	September 17	**Cincinnati Reds**	**W** 21–0	1–0	Spartan Field	5,000	Recap	
2	September 24	New York Giants	**W** 17–7	2–0	Universal Stadium	7,000	Recap	
3	October 1	**Chicago Cardinals**	**W** 7–6	3–0	Spartan Field		Recap	
4	October 8	at **Green Bay Packers**	**L** 0–17	3–1	City Stadium	5,200	Recap	
5	October 15	at Boston Redskins	**W** 13–0	4–1	Fenway Park	20,000	Recap	
6	October 18	at Philadelphia Eagles	**W** 25–0	5–1	Baker Bowl	20,000	Recap	
7	November 5	at New York Giants	**L** 10–13	5–2	Polo Grounds	15,000	Recap	
8	November 12	**Green Bay Packers**	**W** 7–0	6–2	Spartan Field	7,500	Recap	
9	November 19	at **Cincinnati Reds**	**L** 7–10	6–3	Redland Field	7,500	Recap	
10	November 26	at **Chicago Bears**	**L** 14–17	6–4	Wrigley Field	9,000	Recap	
11	December 3	**Chicago Bears**	**L** 7–17	6–5	Spartan Field	10,000	Recap	
Note: Intra-division opponents are in **bold** text. Non-league game in italics.

== Roster ==
1933 Portsmouth Spartans final roster
Backs: 59 Gene Alford RB/S/K; 51 Ernie Caddel RB/CB; 55 Ace Gutowsky FB/LB; 57 Father Lumpkin RB/CB; 60 Glenn Presnell RB/S/K; 66 Elmer Schaake FB/LB; 56 Mule Wilson RB/CB	Ends: 50 John Cavosie K; 33 Harry Ebding; 30 John Schneller	Linemen: 38 Maury Bodenger G/DG; 46 Jim Bowdoin G/DG; 48 George Christensen T/DT; 49 Earl Elser G/T/DG/DT; 45 Ox Emerson G/DG; 42 Buster Mitchell T/DT; 43 Clare Randolph C/MG; 41 Harry Thayer T/DT; 44 John Wager C/G/MG; Reserve: Dutch Clark RB/S/K; rookies in italics

== Standings ==
NFL Western Division
	W	L	T	PCT	DIV	PF	PA	STK
Chicago Bears	10	2	1	.833	7–0	133	82	W4
Portsmouth Spartans	6	5	0	.545	3–4	128	87	L3
Green Bay Packers	5	7	1	.417	2–4	170	107	L1
Cincinnati Reds	3	6	1	.333	2–2	38	110	W1
Chicago Cardinals	1	9	1	.100	1–5	52	101	T1

Note: Tie games were not officially counted in the standings until 1972.
