= 1931 All-Pro Team =

Official list of the best NFL players in 1931

The 1931 All-Pro Team consisted of American football players chosen by various selectors for the All-Pro team of the National Football League (NFL) for the 1931 NFL season. An official 11-man "All League" team was selected by the coaches of the NFL on behalf of the league, designated as (NFL-1) below.

Teams were also selected by, among others, the Green Bay Press-Gazette based on the returns of ballots sent to each club in the league as well as sports writers and officials, the United Press (UP), and Collyer's Eye (CE).

Players displayed in bold were consensus first-team selections. Four players were unanimously selected for the first team by all three selectors: Portsmouth Spartans quarterback Dutch Clark; Chicago Bears halfback Red Grange; Chicago Cardinals fullback Ernie Nevers; and New York Giants guard Butch Gibson.

== Team ==
Position	Player	Team	Selector(s)
Quarterback	**Dutch Clark**	Portsmouth Spartans	NFL-1, GB-1, UP-1, CE-1
Quarterback	Red Dunn	Green Bay Packers	GB-2, UP-2
Quarterback	Carl Brumbaugh	Chicago Bears	CE-2
Quarterback	Benny Friedman	New York Giants	GB-3
Halfback	**Red Grange**	Chicago Bears	NFL-1, GB-1, UP-1, CE-1
Halfback	**Ken Strong**	Staten Island Stapletons	GB-2, UP-1, CE-1
Halfback	Johnny Blood	Green Bay Packers	NFL-1, GB-1, UP-2
Halfback	Dick Nesbitt	Chicago Bears	UP-2, GB-3
Halfback	Glenn Presnell	Portsmouth Spartans	GB-2
Halfback	Hap Moran	New York Giants	CE-2
Halfback	Father Lumpkin	Portsmouth Spartans	GB-3
Fullback	**Ernie Nevers**	Chicago Cardinals	NFL-1, GB-1, UP-1, CE-1
Fullback	Johnny Kitzmiller	New York Giants	UP-2
Fullback	Bronko Nagurski	Chicago Bears	CE-2
Fullback	Bo Molenda	Green Bay Packers	GB-2
Fullback	Herb Joesting	Chicago Bears	GB-3
End	**LaVern Dilweg**	Green Bay Packers	NFL-1, GB-1, UP-1, CE-2
End	**Luke Johnsos**	Chicago Bears	GB-2, UP-1, CE-2
End	Bill McKalip	Portsmouth Spartans	GB-2, UP-2, CE-1
End	Red Badgro	New York Giants	NFL-1, GB-1
End	Tom Nash	Green Bay Packers	CE-1
End	Chuck Braidwood	Cleveland Indians	UP-2
End	Ray Flaherty	New York Giants	GB-3
End	Al Rose	Providence Steam Roller	GB-3
Tackle	**Cal Hubbard**	Green Bay Packers	NFL-1, GB-1, UP-1
Tackle	**Bill Owen**	New York Giants	GB-3, UP-2, CE-1
Tackle	Len Grant	New York Giants	UP-1, CE-2
Tackle	Dick Stahlman	Green Bay Packers	GB-2, CE-1
Tackle	George Christensen	Portsmouth Spartans	NFL-1, GB-1
Tackle	Jap Douds	Portsmouth Spartans	GB-2, CE-2
Tackle	Link Lyman	Chicago Bears	UP-2
Tackle	Lou Gordon	Brooklyn Dodgers	GB-3
Guard	**Butch Gibson**	New York Giants	NFL-1, GB-1, UP-1, CE-1
Guard	**Mike Michalske**	Green Bay Packers	NFL-1, GB-1, UP-1, CE-2
Guard	Zuck Carlson	Chicago Bears	GB-3, CE-1
Guard	Walt Kiesling	Chicago Cardinals	GB-2, UP-2, CE-2
Guard	Dave Myers	Brooklyn Dodgers	UP-2
Guard	Al Graham	Providence Steam Roller	GB-2
Guard	Maury Bodenger	Portsmouth Spartans	GB-3
Center	**Frank McNally**	Chicago Bears	NFL-1, GB-1, UP-1
Center	Nate Barragar	Green Bay Packers	GB-3, UP-2, CE-1
Center	Mel Hein	New York Giants	GB-2
Center	Bert Pearson	Chicago Bears	CE-2
