= 1932 All-Pro Team =

Official list of the best NFL players in 1932

The 1932 All-Pro Team consisted of American football players chosen by various selectors for the All-Pro team of the National Football League (NFL) for the 1932 NFL season. Teams were selected by, among others, seven of the eight NFL coaches for the United Press, Collyer's Eye (CE), and the Green Bay Press-Gazette.

Five players were selected for the first team by all three selectors: Portsmouth Spartans quarterback Dutch Clark; Chicago Bears fullback Bronko Nagurski; New York Giants end Ray Flaherty; Green Bay Packers tackle Cal Hubbard; and Chicago Bears guard Zuck Carlson.

== Team ==
Position	Player	Team	Selector(s)
Quarterback	Dutch Clark	Portsmouth Spartans	GB-1, UP-1, CE-1
Quarterback	Arnie Herber	Green Bay Packers	GB-1, UP-1, CE-2
Quarterback	Keith Molesworth	Chicago Bears	GB-2, UP-2, CE-2
Halfback	Father Lumpkin	Portsmouth Spartans	GB-1, UP-1
Halfback	Cliff Battles	Boston Redskins	CE-1
Halfback	Red Grange	Chicago Bears	GB-2
Halfback	Jack Grossman	Brooklyn Dodgers	GB-2, CE-2
Halfback	Glenn Presnell	Portsmouth Spartans	GB-2
Halfback	Bob Campiglio	Staten Island Stapletons	GB-2
Fullback	Bronko Nagurski	Chicago Bears	GB-1, UP-1, CE-1
Fullback	Clarke Hinkle	Green Bay Packers	GB-2, UP-2, CE-1
Fullback	Ace Gutowsky	Portsmouth Spartans	CE-2
End	Ray Flaherty	New York Giants	GB-1, UP-1, CE-1
End	Luke Johnsos	Chicago Bears	GB-1, CE-2
End	Tom Nash	Green Bay Packers	GB-1, CE-2
End	Bill Hewitt	Chicago Bears	GB-2, UP-2, CE-1
End	LaVern Dilweg	Green Bay Packers	GB-2, UP-2
Tackle	Cal Hubbard	Green Bay Packers	GB-1, UP-1, CE-1
Tackle	Len Grant	New York Giants	UP-1, CE-1
Tackle	Turk Edwards	Boston Redskins	GB-1, CE-2
Tackle	George Christensen	Portsmouth Spartans	GB-2, UP-2, CE-2
Tackle	Jake Williams	Chicago Cardinals	GB-2
Tackle	Lou Gordon	Chicago Cardinals	UP-2
Guard	Zuck Carlson	Chicago Bears	GB-1, UP-1, CE-1
Guard	Ox Emerson	Portsmouth Spartans	UP-1, CE-1
Guard	Walt Kiesling	Chicago Cardinals	GB-1
Guard	Joe Kopcha	Chicago Bears	UP-2, CE-2
Guard	George Hurley	Boston Braves	GB-2
Guard	Maury Bodenger	Portsmouth Spartans	GB-2
Guard	Joe Zeller	Green Bay Packers	UP-2
Guard	Butch Gibson	New York Giants	CE-2
Center	Tim Moynihan	Chicago Cardinals	UP-1, CE-1
Center	Nate Barragar	Green Bay Packers	GB-1, UP-2, CE-2
Center	Mel Hein	New York Giants	GB-2
