= 1934 All-Pro Team =

Official list of the best NFL players in 1934

The 1934 All-Pro Team consisted of American football players chosen by various selectors for the All-Pro team of the National Football League (NFL) for the 1934 NFL season. Teams were selected by, among others, the Associated Press (AP), the United Press (UP), the Green Bay Press-Gazette (GB) based on the composite view of the coaches of 10 NFL teams and a half dozen NFL officials, Collyer's Eye (CE), and the Chicago Daily News (CDN).

Players displayed in bold were consensus first-team selections. Five players were selected as first-team All-Pro players by all five selectors: Detroit Lions quarterback Dutch Clark; Chicago Bears halfback Beattie Feathers; Chicago Bears fullback Bronko Nagurski; Chicago Bears end Bill Hewitt; and New York Giants center Mel Hein.

== Team ==
Position	Player	Team	Selector(s)
Quarterback	**Dutch Clark**	Detroit Lions	AP-1, UP-1, GB-1, CE, CDN-1
Quarterback	Harry Newman	New York Giants	AP-2, UP-2, GB-2, CDN-2
Halfback	**Beattie Feathers**	Chicago Bears	AP-1, UP-1, GB-1, CE, CDN-1
Halfback	**Ken Strong**	New York Giants	AP-1, UP-2, GB-1, CE, CDN-1
Halfback	Cliff Battles	Boston Redskins	AP-2, UP-1, GB-2, CDN-2
Halfback	Swede Hanson	Philadelphia Eagles	AP-2, GB-2
Halfback	Glenn Presnell	Detroit Lions	UP-2, CDN-2
Fullback	**Bronko Nagurski**	Chicago Bears	AP-1, UP-1, GB-1, CE, CDN-1
Fullback	Clarke Hinkle	Green Bay Packers	UP-2, GB-2
Fullback	Ace Gutowsky	Detroit Lions	AP-2
Fullback	Jack Manders	Chicago Bears	CDN-2
End	**Bill Hewitt**	Chicago Bears	AP-1, UP-1, GB-1, CE, CDN-1
End	Bill McKalip	Detroit Lions	AP-2, UP-2, GB-1, CDN-2
End	Red Badgro	New York Giants	AP-1, CDN-1
End	Buster Mitchell	Detroit Lions	UP-1
End	Harry Ebding	Detroit Lions	AP-2
End	Ray Flaherty	New York Giants	UP-2, CE
End	Bill Smith	Chicago Cardinals	GB-2
End	Bill Karr	Chicago Bears	GB-2, CDN-2
Tackle	**Link Lyman**	Chicago Bears	AP-2, UP-1, GB-1, CE, CDN-2
Tackle	**Bill Morgan**	New York Giants	AP-1, GB-1, CDN-1
Tackle	George Christensen	Detroit Lions	AP-1, UP-2, GB-2, CE
Tackle	Turk Edwards	Boston Redskins	AP-2, UP-1, GB-2, CDN-1
Tackle	Harry Field	Chicago Cardinals	UP-2, CDN-2
Guard	**Joe Kopcha**	Chicago Bears	AP-1, UP-1, GB-1, CDN-1
Guard	**Ox Emerson**	Detroit Lions	AP-2, UP-1, CE, CDN-1
Guard	Mike Michalske	Green Bay Packers	AP-2, GB-1, CDN-2
Guard	Potsy Jones	New York Giants	UP-2, GB-2, CE, CDN-2
Guard	Butch Gibson	New York Giants	AP-1
Guard	Zuck Carlson	Chicago Bears	UP-2
Guard	Herman Hickman	Brooklyn Dodgers	GB-2
Center	**Mel Hein**	New York Giants	AP-1, UP-1, GB-1, CE, CDN-1
Center	Nate Barragar	Green Bay Packers	AP-2 [tie]
Center	Eddie Kawal	Chicago Bears	AP-2 [tie], GB-2
Center	Bernie Hughes	Chicago Cardinals	UP-2
Center	Cap Oehler	Pittsburgh Pirates	CDN-2
