= 1933 Green Bay Packers season =

NFL team season

- Head coach: Curly Lambeau
- Home stadium: City Stadium (Green Bay); Borchert Field (Milwaukee)

Results
- Record: 5–7–1
- Division place: 3rd NFL Western
- Playoffs: Did not qualify

The 1933 Green Bay Packers season was their 15th season overall and their 13th season in the National Football League (NFL). This was the first year of divisional play and Green Bay competed in the Western Division. The team finished with a 5–7–1 record under coach Curly Lambeau, the first losing season in team history. Beginning this season, the Packers began playing some home games in Milwaukee at Borchert Field to draw additional revenue, the only one in Milwaukee this season was on October 1, a 10–7 loss to the New York Giants.

The Packers' 14–7 loss on September 23 to the Chicago Bears gave the Bears the edge in the series between the two teams, an advantage that the Bears held for over 84 years. The Packers reclaimed the all-time lead in the rivalry in 2017 with a 35–14 victory over the Bears at Lambeau Field on September 28.

== Schedule ==
Week	Date	Opponent	Result	Record	Venue	References
1	September 17	Boston Redskins	**T** 7–7	0–0–1	City Stadium	
2	September 24	**Chicago Bears**	**L** 7–14	0–1–1	City Stadium	
3	October 1	New York Giants	**L** 7–10	0–2–1	Borchert Field	
4	October 8	**Portsmouth Spartans**	**W** 17–0	1–2–1	City Stadium	
5	October 15	Pittsburgh Pirates	**W** 47–0	2–2–1	City Stadium	
6	October 22	at **Chicago Bears**	**L** 7–10	2–3–1	Wrigley Field	
7	October 29	Philadelphia Eagles	**W** 35–9	3–3–1	City Stadium	
8	November 5	at **Chicago Cardinals**	**W** 14–6	4–3–1	Wrigley Field	
9	November 12	at **Portsmouth Spartans**	**L** 0–7	4–4–1	Universal Stadium	
10	November 19	at Boston Redskins	**L** 7–20	4–5–1	Fenway Park	
11	November 26	at New York Giants	**L** 6–17	4–6–1	Polo Grounds	
12	December 3	at Philadelphia Eagles	**W** 10–0	5–6–1	Baker Bowl	
13	December 10	at **Chicago Bears**	**L** 6–7	5–7–1	Wrigley Field	
Note: Intra-division opponents are in **bold** text.

== Game summaries ==
=== Week 1: vs. Boston Redskins ===
	1	2	3	4	Total
Redskins	0	0	0	7	7
Packers	0	0	7	0	7

at City Stadium, Green Bay, Wisconsin

- Date: September 17, 1933
- Attendance: 5,000

==== Scoring summary ====
Team	Qtr	Play Description (Extra Point)
Packers	3	Rose 8 yard touchdown pass from Herber (Grove kick)
Redskins	4	Frankian 33-yard touchdown pass from Westfall (Musick kick)

=== Week 2: vs. Chicago Bears ===
	1	2	3	4	Total
Bears	0	0	0	14	14
Packers	0	0	7	0	7

at City Stadium, Green Bay, Wisconsin

- Date: September 24, 1933
- Attendance: 10,000

==== Scoring summary ====
Team	Qtr	Play Description (Extra Point)
Packers	3	Goldenberg 1-yard touchdown run (Monnett kick)
Bears	4	Johnsos 46-yard touchdown pass from Hewitt (Manders kick)
Bears	4	Hewitt recovered blocked kick in end zone (Manders kick)

=== Week 3: vs. New York Giants ===
	1	2	3	4	Total
Giants	3	7	0	0	10
Packers	0	0	0	7	7

at Borchert Field, Milwaukee, Wisconsin

- Date: October 1, 1933
- Attendance: 12,467

==== Scoring summary ====
Team	Qtr	Play Description (Extra Point)
Giants	1	Strong 39 yard field goal
Giants	2	Burnett 19-yard touchdown pass from Newman (Newman kick)
Packers	4	Goldenberg 3-yard touchdown run (Blood pass from Herber)

=== Week 4: vs. Portsmouth Spartans ===
	1	2	3	4	Total
Spartans	0	0	0	0	0
Packers	7	0	3	7	17

at City Stadium, Green Bay, Wisconsin

- Date: October 8, 1933
- Attendance: 5,200

==== Scoring summary ====
Team	Qtr	Play Description (Extra Point)
Packers	1	Bruder 1-yard touchdown run (Grove kick)
Packers	3	Hinkle 30-yard field goal
Packers	4	Blood 30-yard touchdown pass from Monnett (Monnett kick)

=== Week 5: vs. Pittsburgh Pirates ===
	1	2	3	4	Total
Pirates	0	0	0	0	0
Packers	7	20	13	7	47

at City Stadium, Green Bay, Wisconsin

- Date: October 15, 1933
- Attendance: 4,000

==== Scoring summary ====
Team	Qtr	Play Description (Extra Point)
Packers	1	Hinkle 1-yard touchdown run (Monnett kick)
Packers	2	Monnett 7-yard touchdown run (Monnett kick failed)
Packers	2	Goldenberg interception returned 67 yards for a touchdown (Grove kick)
Packers	2	Goldenberg 3-yard touchdown run (Monnett kick)
Packers	3	Bruder 52-yard touchdown run (Herber kick)
Packers	3	Monnett 12-yard touchdown run (Engelmann kick failed)
Packers	4	Engelmann 40 yard lateral for touchdown from Monnett after 9-yard pass from Herber (Monnett kick)

=== Week 6: at Chicago Bears ===
	1	2	3	4	Total
Packers	0	7	0	0	7
Bears	0	0	0	10	10

at Wrigley Field, Chicago, Illinois

- Date: October 22, 1933
- Attendance: 19,000

==== Scoring summary ====
Team	Qtr	Play Description (Extra Point)
Packers	2	Blood 43-yard touchdown pass from Herber (Monnett kick)
Bears	4	Johnsos 24-yard touchdown pass from Grange (Manders kick)
Bears	4	Manders 30-yard field goal

=== Week 7: vs. Philadelphia Eagles ===
	1	2	3	4	Total
Eagles	0	7	2	0	9
Packers	14	0	0	21	35

at City Stadium, Green Bay, Wisconsin

- Date: October 29, 1933
- Attendance: 3,007

==== Scoring summary ====
Team	Qtr	Play Description (Extra Point)
Packers	1	Goldenberg 2-yard touchdown run (Grove kick)
Packers	1	Engelmann interception returned 45 yards for a touchdown (Grove kick)
Eagles	2	Hanson 35-yard touchdown pass from Kirkman (Kirkman kick)
Eagles	3	Safety, Hinkle fumbled in end zone
Packers	4	Goldenberg 15-yard touchdown pass from Monnett (Grove kick)
Packers	4	Blood 13-yard touchdown pass from Monnett (Monnett kick)
Packers	4	Goldenberg blocked punt returned 34 yards for a touchdown (Monnett kick)

=== Week 8: at Chicago Cardinals ===
	1	2	3	4	Total
Packers	0	0	7	7	14
Cardinals	0	0	6	0	6

at Wrigley Field, Chicago, Illinois

- Date: November 5, 1933
- Attendance: 5,000

==== Scoring summary ====
Team	Qtr	Play Description (Extra Point)
Packers	3	Monnett 21-yard touchdown run (Monnett kick)
Cardinals	3	Nesbitt 2-yard touchdown run (kick failed)
Packers	4	Hinkle 1-yard touchdown run (Grove kick)

=== Week 9: at Portsmouth Spartans ===
	1	2	3	4	Total
Packers	0	0	0	0	0
Spartans	0	0	7	0	7

at Universal Stadium, Portsmouth, Ohio

- Date: November 12, 1933
- Attendance: 7,500

==== Scoring summary ====
Team	Qtr	Play Description (Extra Point)
Spartans	3	Caddel 7-yard touchdown run (Presnell kick)

=== Week 10: at Boston Redskins ===
	1	2	3	4	Total
Packers	0	0	7	0	7
Redskins	0	6	7	7	20

at Fenway Park, Boston, Massachusetts

- Date: November 19, 1933
- Attendance: 16,399

==== Scoring summary ====
Team	Qtr	Play Description (Extra Point)
Redskins	2	Musick 1-yard touchdown run (kick failed)
Redskins	3	Pinckert interception returned 65 yards for a touchdown (Musick kick)
Packers	3	Hinkle 1-yard touchdown run (Monnett kick)
Redskins	4	Musick 3-yard touchdown run (Musick kick)

=== Week 11: at New York Giants ===
	1	2	3	4	Total
Packers	0	0	0	6	6
Giants	7	0	10	0	17

at Polo Grounds, Manhattan, New York

- Date: November 26, 1933
- Attendance: 17,000

==== Scoring summary ====
Team	Qtr	Play Description (Extra Point)
Giants	1	Burnett interception returned 84 yards for a touchdown (Strong kick)
Giants	3	Badgro 35-yard touchdown pass from Newman (Strong kick)
Giants	3	Strong 30-yard field goal
Packers	4	Gantenbein 24-yard touchdown pass from Herber (kick failed)

=== Week 12: at Philadelphia Eagles ===
	1	2	3	4	Total
Packers	0	3	0	7	10
Eagles	0	0	0	0	0

at Baker Bowl, Philadelphia, Pennsylvania

- Date: December 3, 1933
- Attendance: 9,500

==== Scoring summary ====
Team	Qtr	Play Description (Extra Point)
Packers	2	Hinkle 32-yard field goal
Packers	4	Hinkle 2-yard touchdown run (Grove kick)

=== Week 13: at Chicago Bears ===
	1	2	3	4	Total
Packers	0	0	0	6	6
Bears	0	7	0	0	7

at Wrigley Field, Chicago, Illinois

- Date: December 10, 1933
- Attendance: 7,000

==== Scoring summary ====
Team	Qtr	Play Description (Extra Point)
Bears	2	Ronzani 42-yard touchdown pass from Molesworth (Manders kick)
Packers	4	Monnett 85-yard punt return for a touchdown (kick blocked)

== Roster ==
1933 Green Bay Packers final roster
Backs: 14 Johnny Blood RB/CB/S; 13 Hank Bruder RB/CB; 25 Wuert Engelmann RB/CB/S; 21 Buckets Goldenberg FB/LB; 11 Roger Grove RB/CB/S/K; 41 Arnie Herber RB/CB/S; 30 Clarke Hinkle FB/LB; 18 Bob Monnett RB/CB/K	Linemen: 38 Art Bultman C/MG; 32 Rudy Comstock G/DG; 17 Lon Evans G/DG; 20 Norm Greeney G/DG; 27 Cal Hubbard T/DT; 28 Joe Kurth T/DT; 31 Mike Michalske G/DG; 37 Claude Perry T/DT; 24 Al Sarafiny C/MG; 26 Clyde Van Sickle G/DG	Ends/Receivers: 22 Lavvie Dilweg; 46 Milt Gantenbein; 34 Al Rose; 23 Ben Smith; Rookies in italics

== Standings ==
NFL Western Division
	W	L	T	PCT	DIV	PF	PA	STK
Chicago Bears	10	2	1	.833	7–0	133	82	W4
Portsmouth Spartans	6	5	0	.545	3–4	128	87	L3
Green Bay Packers	5	7	1	.417	2–4	170	107	L1
Cincinnati Reds	3	6	1	.333	2–2	38	110	W1
Chicago Cardinals	1	9	1	.100	1–5	52	101	T1

Note: Tie games were not officially counted in the standings until 1972.
