= 1933 Chicago Bears season =

NFL team season

- General manager: George Halas
- Head coach: George Halas
- Home stadium: Wrigley Field

Results
- Record: 10–2–1
- Division place: 1st NFL West
- Playoffs: Won NFL Championship (vs. Giants) 23–21

The 1933 season was the Chicago Bears' 14th in the National Football League and the 11th season under head coach George Halas. The team was able to improve on their 7–1–6 record from 1932 and finished with a 10–2–1 record.

The Bears won their first six games while allowing only 33 points. In the middle of the season, the team struggled on the road, losing to Boston and New York and eking out a tie against the new Philadelphia Eagles franchise. After that, however, the Bears regained their winning ways, finishing the regular season with four consecutive wins, including two against Portsmouth, their foe in the indoor 1932 playoff game. The team won the newly established Western Division by 3½ games, and hosted and won the first ever NFL championship game.

== Season highlights ==
The Bears' season was typified by solid defense, a high-octane passing attack (for the era), and the best kicking game in the league. Only three times during the season did opponents score more than 9 points on the Bears. The club finished second behind Brooklyn in scoring defense. Their line was greatly improved by the addition of huge George "Moose" Musso, who weighted over 260 pounds and starred for the Bears for many years. The Bears had the third best scoring offense, trailing the explosive Giants and the Packers. Living legend Red Grange and future legend Bronko Nagurski continued to lead the running attack but the Bears scored a large majority of their touchdowns through the air. Luke Johnsos continued to play well at end but the aerial attack was vastly improved by the emergence of second year end Bill Hewitt and rookie end Bill Karr. All in all, the Bears scored 11 of their 14 offensive touchdowns through passes. Though statistics were spotty in 1933, Bill Hewitt was among the league leaders in receiving with 16 catches for 274 yards and 2 touchdowns. The biggest improvement for the Bears and, in many games, the key to their wins was the addition of "Automatic" Jack Manders, one of the first great place kickers in league history. Manders made 14 of 14 PATs (pretty much unheard of in those days) and led the league with 6 field goals. Undoubtedly, the new rule that brought the ball back to the hash marks after every play helped Manders (and all other NFL kickers), but Manders' consistency in the kicking game contributed to the Bears' success all the way through the 1940 season.

== Regular season ==
=== Schedule ===
Game	Date	Opponent	Result	Record	Venue	Attendance	Recap	Sources
1	September 24	at **Green Bay Packers**	**W** 14–7	1–0	City Stadium	10,000	Recap	
2	October 1	Boston Redskins	**W** 7–0	2–0	Soldier Field	8,000	Recap	
3	October 8	at Brooklyn Dodgers	**W** 10–0	3–0	Ebbets Field	18,000	Recap	
4	October 15	**Chicago Cardinals**	**W** 12–9	4–0	Wrigley Field	12,000	Recap	
5	October 22	**Green Bay Packers**	**W** 10–7	5–0	Wrigley Field	19,000	Recap	
6	October 29	New York Giants	**W** 14–10	6–0	Wrigley Field	28,000	Recap	
7	November 5	at Boston Redskins	**L** 0–10	6–1	Fenway Park	22,820	Recap	
8	November 12	at Philadelphia Eagles	**T** 3–3	6–1–1	Baker Bowl	17,850	Recap	
9	November 19	at New York Giants	**L** 0–3	6–2–1	Polo Grounds	22,000	Recap	
10	November 26	**Portsmouth Spartans**	**W** 17–14	7–2–1	Wrigley Field	9,000	Recap	
11	November 30	**at Chicago Cardinals**	**W** 22–6	8–2–1	Wrigley Field		Recap	
12	December 3	at **Portsmouth Spartans**	**W** 17–7	9–2–1	Universal Stadium	10,000	Recap	
13	December 10	**Green Bay Packers**	**W** 7–6	10–2–1	Wrigley Field	7,000	Recap	
Note: Intra-division opponents are in **bold** text. Thanksgiving: November 30.

== Standings ==
NFL Western Division
	W	L	T	PCT	DIV	PF	PA	STK
Chicago Bears	10	2	1	.833	7–0	133	82	W4
Portsmouth Spartans	6	5	0	.545	3–4	128	87	L3
Green Bay Packers	5	7	1	.417	2–4	170	107	L1
Cincinnati Reds	3	6	1	.333	2–2	38	110	W1
Chicago Cardinals	1	9	1	.100	1–5	52	101	T1

Note: Tie games were not officially counted in the standings until 1972.

== NFL Championship Game ==
=== Summary ===
The Bears hosted the NFL Eastern Division champion New York Giants in the NFL championship game. The teams had split the season series, with both teams prevailing at home. The game was played at Wrigley Field in clear, crisp weather. Both teams brought high-powered offenses to the game but the Bears had an advantage on defense. Both teams featured their passing attacks throughout the game but the Giants took a first half lead with a 29-yard pass to Red Badgro despite two Manders field goals. The second half was back and forth, with both clubs taking the lead twice. The game was won with an exciting play with less than 3 minutes remaining—a pass from Bronko Nagurski to Bill Hewitt who lateraled to Bill Karr. Karr then scampered 36 yards for the winning score. The Bears won the game 23–21, giving them their second straight league title and third overall.

== Roster ==
1933 Chicago Bears final roster
Backs: 8 Carl Brumbaugh QB/RB/CB/S; 5 George Corbett RB/QB/CB/S; 27 John Doehring RB/CB; 77 Red Grange RB/CB/S; 10 Jack Manders FB/LB/K; 4 Keith Molesworth RB/QB/CB/S; 3 Bronko Nagurski FB/LB; 6 Gene Ronzani RB/CB; 7 Johnny Sisk RB/CB	Linemen: 15 Bill Buckler G/DG/T/DT; 20 Zuck Carlson G/DG; 29 Joe Kopcha G/DG; 12 Link Lyman T/DT; 76 Ookie Miller C/MG; 16 George Musso T/DT; 26 Bert Pearson C/MG; 44 Ray Richards T/DT; 19 Dick Stahlman T/DT; 17 Joe Zeller G/DG	Ends/Receivers: 9 Paul Franklin; 56 Bill Hewitt; 22 Bill Karr; Reserve: 24 Luke Johnsos E (inactive); Rookies in italics

=== Future Hall of Fame players ===
- Red Grange, back
- Bill Hewitt, end
- Link Lyman, tackle
- George Musso, tackle (rookie from Millikin)
- Bronko Nagurski, fullback
- George Trafton, center

=== Other leading players ===
- Carl Brumbaugh, quarterback
- Luke Johnsos, end
- Bill Karr, end (rookie from West Virginia University)
- Joe Kopcha, guard
- Jack Manders, back/kicker (rookie from University of Minnesota)
- Keith Molesworth, back
- Gene Ronzani, back (rookie from Marquette)
