= 1934 Chicago Bears season =

NFL team season

- Head coach: George Halas
- Home stadium: Wrigley Field

Results
- Record: 13–0
- Division place: 1st NFL Western
- Playoffs: Lost NFL Championship (at Giants) 13–30

The 1934 season was the Chicago Bears' 15th in the National Football League and 12th season under head coach George Halas. The team was able to improve on their 10–2–1 record from 1933 and finished with an undefeated 13–0 record (the best record in the 2nd Halas era).

The season began with startling success, as the Bears reeled off nine straight wins in which they scored 20 or more points each game while allowing more than 7 points only twice. The last four wins were more difficult, including a tough win over the Giants in New York and back-to-back home-and-away close victories over the Detroit Lions in that franchise's first year in Detroit. The Bears outscored opponents 286–86, and became the first team to go unbeaten and untied in the NFL's regular season.

The Bears won the NFL Western Division title for the second straight year and met the NFL Eastern Division champion New York Giants once again in the NFL Championship game. The Bears were denied perfection as the Giants went on to win what would become known as the "Sneakers Game".

== Season highlights ==
The 1934 Bears were without a doubt the best offensive team in NFL history to that point. They scored 37 touchdowns in 13 games, with 12 different players reaching the end zone during the year. Bronko Nagurski rushed for 586 yards on 123 carries and 8 touchdowns while blocking for a record-setting performance by rookie Beattie Feathers. Feathers, who played in only 11 games due to a shoulder injury, rushed for 1,004 yards and 8 touchdowns. He was not only the NFL's first official 1,000-yard rusher, but he performed this feat 12 years before it would be repeated (by Steve Van Buren in 1946) in an era when all players "went both ways" and many backs on a team shared rushing, receiving, and passing duties.

The Bear offense was far more, however, than Nagurski and Feathers running the ball. Red Grange, Carl Brumbaugh, Bill Hewitt, and Gene Ronzani each caught at least 2 touchdown passes, four different players passed for 3 or more each, and "Automatic" Jack Manders led the league with 10 field goals. The club's line got even better than before with Walt Kiesling joining Lyman, Musso, and Kopcha on the best interior unit in football. The Bears breezed into the Polo Grounds in New York as heavy favorites to win their third straight NFL title.

== Schedule ==
| Game | Date | Opponent | Result | Record | Venue | Attendance | Recap | Sources |
|---|---|---|---|---|---|---|---|---|
| 1 | September 23 | at **Green Bay Packers** | **W** 24–10 | 1–0 | City Stadium | 13,500 | Recap | |
| 2 | September 30 | at **Cincinnati Reds** | **W** 21–3 | 2–0 | Crosley Field | 5,500 | Recap | |
| 3 | October 7 | at Brooklyn Dodgers | **W** 21–7 | 3–0 | Ebbets Field | 20,000 | Recap | |
| 4 | October 10 | at Pittsburgh Pirates | **W** 28–0 | 4–0 | Forbes Field | 19,386 | Recap | |
| 5 | October 14 | at **Chicago Cardinals** | **W** 20–0 | 5–0 | Wrigley Field | 15,000 | Recap | |
| 6 | October 21 | **Cincinnati Reds** | **W** 41–7 | 6–0 | Wrigley Field | 11,000 | Recap | |
| 7 | October 28 | **Green Bay Packers** | **W** 27–14 | 7–0 | Wrigley Field | 11,000 | Recap | |
| 8 | November 4 | New York Giants | **W** 27–7 | 8–0 | Wrigley Field | 25,000 | Recap | |
| 9 | November 11 | at Boston Redskins | **W** 21–0 | 9–0 | Fenway Park | 26,000 | Recap | |
| 10 | November 18 | at New York Giants | **W** 10–9 | 10–0 | Polo Grounds | 45,404 | Recap | |
| 11 | November 25 | **Chicago Cardinals** | **W** 17–6 | 11–0 | Wrigley Field | 13,800 | Recap | |
| 12 | November 29 | at **Detroit Lions** | **W** 19–16 | 12–0 | Titan Stadium | 25,000 | Recap | |
| 13 | December 2 | **Detroit Lions** | **W** 10–7 | 13–0 | Wrigley Field | 34,412 | Recap | |
Note: Intra-division opponents are in **bold** text. Thanksgiving: November 29.

== Standings ==
NFL Western Division
| | W | L | T | PCT | DIV | PF | PA | STK |
|---|---|---|---|---|---|---|---|---|
| Chicago Bears | 13 | 0 | 0 | 1.000 | 8–0 | 286 | 86 | W13 |
| Detroit Lions | 10 | 3 | 0 | .769 | 5–3 | 238 | 59 | L3 |
| Green Bay Packers | 7 | 6 | 0 | .538 | 4–5 | 156 | 112 | W1 |
| Chicago Cardinals | 5 | 6 | 0 | .455 | 4–5 | 80 | 84 | W1 |
| St. Louis Gunners | 1 | 2 | 0 | .333 | 0–2 | 27 | 61 | L2 |
| Cincinnati Reds | 0 | 8 | 0 | .000 | 0–6 | 10 | 243 | L8 |

Note: Tie games were not officially counted in the standings until 1972.

== Championship game ==
The Bears again met the NFL Eastern Division champion New York Giants in the NFL Championship game, this time in New York. The game was played at the Polo Grounds on a very slick, ice-covered field. The Bears were also without star halfback Feathers and All-Pro guard Kopcha. Both teams struggled with the field conditions but the Bears were able to post a 13–3 lead early in the third quarter. The Giants had famously changed their cleats to sneakers at halftime and this gave them an advantage in footing as well as a psychological advantage over the Bears. 27 unanswered New York points ensued, and the Giants won their second NFL title and first championship game, 30–13. Thus, the Bears were denied a perfect season.

== Roster ==
=== Future Hall of Fame players ===
- Red Grange, back
- Bill Hewitt, end
- Walt Kiesling, guard (acquired from Cardinals)
- Link Lyman, tackle
- George Musso, tackle
- Bronko Nagurski, fullback

=== Other leading players ===
- Carl Brumbaugh, quarterback
- Beattie Feathers, back (rookie from University of Tennessee)
- Luke Johnsos, end
- Bill Karr, end
- Joe Kopcha, guard
- Jack Manders, back/kicker
- Keith Molesworth, back
- Gene Ronzani, back
