= 1934 Chicago Cardinals season =

American football team season

- Owner: Charles Bidwill
- Head coach: Paul Schissler
- Home stadium: Wrigley Field

Results
- Record: 5–6
- Division place: 4th NFL Western
- Playoffs: Did not qualify

Team photo of the 1934 Chicago Cardinals.

The 1934 Chicago Cardinals season was their 15th in the National Football League. The team improved on its previous output of 1–9–1, winning five games, but failing to qualify for the playoffs for the ninth consecutive season. Despite shutting out five opponents, the Cardinals were themselves shutout four times; nine of their eleven games left one team scoreless. The Cardinals had only 302 yards passing the entire season, which remains an NFL record.

== Schedule ==
Game	Date	Opponent	Result	Record	Venue	Recap
1	September 23	at **Cincinnati Reds**	**W** 9–0	1–0	Triangle Park	Recap
2	September 30	at **Detroit Lions**	**L** 0–6	1–1	University of Detroit Stadium	Recap
3	October 7	at **Cincinnati Reds**	**W** 16–0	2–1	Corcoran Stadium	Recap
4	October 14	**Chicago Bears**	**L** 0–20	2–2	Wrigley Field	Recap
5	October 21	at **Green Bay Packers**	**L** 0–15	2–3	City Stadium	Recap
6	October 28	at Boston Redskins	**L** 0–9	2–4	Fenway Park	Recap
7	November 6	at Brooklyn Dodgers	**W** 21–0	3–4	Ebbets Field	Recap
8	November 11	**Detroit Lions**	**L** 13–17	3–5	Wrigley Field	Recap
9	November 18	at **Green Bay Packers**	**W** 9–0	4–5	Wisconsin State Fair Park	Recap
10	November 25	at **Chicago Bears**	**L** 6–17	4–6	Wrigley Field	Recap
11	November 29	**Green Bay Packers**	**W** 6–0	5–6	Wrigley Field	Recap
Note: Intra-division opponents are in **bold** text.

== Roster ==
1934 Chicago Cardinals final roster
Backs: 26 Dave Cook RB/CB; 25 Frank Greene RB/S; 33 Homer Griffith RB/CB; 21 Roy Horstmann RB/CB; 48 Mike Mikulak FB/LB; 12 Paul Pardonner RB/S/K; 32 Doug Russell RB/CB; 41 Phil Sarboe RB/S	Linemen: 47 Bree Cuppoletti G/DG; 31 Harry Field T/DT; 22 Lou Gordon T/DT; 46 Phil Handler G/DG; 18 Bernie Hughes C/MG; 49 Ted Isaacson G/DG/T/DT; 45 Frank McNally C/MG; 23 Peter Mehringer G/DG; 34 Howie Tipton G/DG; 44 Billy Volok G/DG	Ends/Receivers: 24 Milan Creighton; 35 Herb Duggins; 20 Bob Neuman; 40 Bill Smith K; rookies in italics

== Standings ==
NFL Western Division
	W	L	T	PCT	DIV	PF	PA	STK
Chicago Bears	13	0	0	1.000	8–0	286	86	W13
Detroit Lions	10	3	0	.769	5–3	238	59	L3
Green Bay Packers	7	6	0	.538	4–5	156	112	W1
Chicago Cardinals	5	6	0	.455	4–5	80	84	W1
St. Louis Gunners	1	2	0	.333	0–2	27	61	L2
Cincinnati Reds	0	8	0	.000	0–6	10	243	L8

Note: Tie games were not officially counted in the standings until 1972.
