= Frank McNally =

Frank McNally may refer to:

- Frank McNally (American football) (1907–1993), American football player
- Frank McNally (politician) (born 1988), British politician
