= 1934 Green Bay Packers season =

NFL team season

- Head coach: Curly Lambeau
- Home stadium: City Stadium (Green Bay); Wisconsin State Fair Park (Milwaukee)

Results
- Record: 7–6
- Division place: 3rd NFL
- Playoffs: Did not qualify

Team photo of the 1934 Green Bay Packers

The 1934 Green Bay Packers season was the franchise's 16th season overall, 14th season in the National Football League, and the 16th under head coach Curly Lambeau. The team improved on their 5–7–1 record from 1933 and finished with a 7–6 record. The Packers played their Milwaukee, Wisconsin home games at Wisconsin State Fair Park.

During this season, a fan fell from the stands at City Stadium and sued the Packers and won a $5,000 verdict. This caused the insurance company to go out of business and the Packers entered receivership. Green Bay business men raised $15,000 in new capital to prevent the team from folding.

== Schedule ==
Week	Date	Opponent	Result	Record
1	Bye			
2	September 16	Philadelphia Eagles	W 19–6	1–0
3	September 23	Chicago Bears	L 10–24	1–1
4	September 30	New York Giants	W 20–6	2–1
5	October 7	Detroit Lions	L 0–3	2–2
6	October 14	Cincinnati Reds	W 41–0	3–2
7	October 21	Chicago Cardinals	W 15–0	4–2
8	October 28	at Chicago Bears	L 14–27	4–3
9	November 4	at Boston Redskins	W 10–0	5–3
10	November 11	at New York Giants	L 3–17	5–4
11	November 18	Chicago Cardinals	L 0–9	5–5
12	November 25	at Detroit Lions	W 3–0	6–5
13	November 29	at Chicago Cardinals	L 0–6	6–6
13	December 2	at St. Louis Gunners	W 21–14	7–6

== Standings ==
NFL Western Division
	W	L	T	PCT	DIV	PF	PA	STK
Chicago Bears	13	0	0	1.000	8–0	286	86	W13
Detroit Lions	10	3	0	.769	5–3	238	59	L3
Green Bay Packers	7	6	0	.538	4–5	156	112	W1
Chicago Cardinals	5	6	0	.455	4–5	80	84	W1
St. Louis Gunners	1	2	0	.333	0–2	27	61	L2
Cincinnati Reds	0	8	0	.000	0–6	10	243	L8

Note: Tie games were not officially counted in the standings until 1972.
