= 1934 St. Louis Gunners season =

National Football League team season

- Head coach: Chile Walsh
- Home stadium: Sportsman's Park

Results
- Record: 1–2
- Division place: 5th NFL West
- Playoffs: Did not qualify

The 1934 St. Louis Gunners season was their sole season in the league. The team won its first game before losing its final two.

== Background ==
On August 8, 1934, before the start of the NFL season, St. Louis purchased the NFL's Cincinnati Reds for $20,000. However, the Gunners needed the other league owners to approve the sale — only then would the Gunners be official members. On August 17, the other owners decided to reject the Gunners' bid to buy the Reds, probably because St. Louis was too far removed from the rest of the clubs, all in the Northeast, and yearly trips there would have increased travel expenses.

Meanwhile the Gunners declined membership into the minor league American Football League. As a result, the new league decided to form the St. Louis Blues. Gunners GM Bud Yates was credited with founding the team. The Blues even lured Dick Frahm away from the Gunners and even took over the lease of Public Schools Stadium. As a result, the Gunners moved their home games to Sportsman's Park. Meanwhile Chile Walsh became the team's fourth head coach in four years.

The Gunners started their 1934 season, 5–0 against several semi-pro teams. The team was searching desperately for decent teams to compete against. However on November 6, 1934, the NFL finally approved the sale of the Cincinnati Reds to St. Louis for $20,000 – $30,000. The Gunners were now officially members of the NFL and were invited to play the Reds' last 3 games of the 1934 NFL season. The Blues then moved to Kansas City two days later in order to avoid fighting the Gunners for control of the St. Louis fanbase.

== Schedule ==
| Game | Date | Opponent | Result | Record | Venue | Attendance | Recap | Sources |
|---|---|---|---|---|---|---|---|---|
**Note: First 8 games played as Cincinnati Reds**
| 9 | November 11 | Pittsburgh Pirates | **W** 6–0 | 1–0 | Sportsman's Park | 13,678 | Recap | |
| 10 | November 18 | at **Detroit Lions** | **L** 7–40 | 1–1 | U of Detroit Stadium | 13,000 | Recap | |
| 11 | December 2 | **Green Bay Packers** | **L** 14–21 | 1–2 | Sportsman's Park | 6,300 | Recap | |
Note: Intra-division opponents are in **bold** text.

== Standings ==
NFL Western Division
| | W | L | T | PCT | DIV | PF | PA | STK |
|---|---|---|---|---|---|---|---|---|
| Chicago Bears | 13 | 0 | 0 | 1.000 | 8–0 | 286 | 86 | W13 |
| Detroit Lions | 10 | 3 | 0 | .769 | 5–3 | 238 | 59 | L3 |
| Green Bay Packers | 7 | 6 | 0 | .538 | 4–5 | 156 | 112 | W1 |
| Chicago Cardinals | 5 | 6 | 0 | .455 | 4–5 | 80 | 84 | W1 |
| St. Louis Gunners | 1 | 2 | 0 | .333 | 0–2 | 27 | 61 | L2 |
| Cincinnati Reds | 0 | 8 | 0 | .000 | 0–6 | 10 | 243 | L8 |

Note: Tie games were not officially counted in the standings until 1972.

== See also ==
- 1934 Cincinnati Reds (NFL) season
