= 1934 Cincinnati Reds (NFL) season =

Defunct NFL team season

1934 Cincinnati Reds season
- Owner: Cincinnati Professional Football Club, Inc.
- General manager: Myron Greentree
- President: M. Scott Kearns
- Head coach: Myers "Ikey" Clark
- Home stadium: Corcoran Stadium

Results
- Record: 0–8
- Division place: 6th NFL Western
- Playoffs: Did not qualify

The 1934 Cincinnati Reds season was their second and final in the National Football League (NFL). The team was shut out in six of their eight games, scoring a total of 10 points in those contests — barely more than 1 point per game — while surrendering 243 points to the opposition.

The team played each of the four home games at different stadiums: Crosley Field, Dayton's Triangle Park, Portsmouth's Universal Stadium, and Xavier University's Corcoran Stadium in a rare night game against the Chicago Cardinals. Including their four road games, every game played by the Cincinnati Reds took place in a different stadium.

The 1934 Reds surrendered 6.40 rushing yards per attempt, the worst figure in professional football history. They are the only team in NFL history to surrender more than five yards per carry.

The team lost 64–0 in week 8 and folded as a franchise. The team was purchased by a group of St. Louis businessmen, who played out the final three games of the Reds' schedule as the St. Louis Gunners.

== Background ==
The Cincinnati Reds football club had come into the National Football League (NFL) in 1933 optimistic and flush with funds. "We have plenty of money and we do not intend to chisel," declared team president Scott Kearns to the press in June. One year later, financial losses mounted and enthusiasm waned and the quest began to find new ownership.

The team was still signing players at the start of August for Reds' training camp, scheduled to begin on the 25th of that month. At the same time, a potential purchaser had emerged in the person of Charles Francis "Chile" Walsh, former head coach at St. Louis University, who was negotiating the purchase of the Reds on behalf of a group of St. Louis businessmen. A certified check for $20,000 for purchase of the franchise was reportedly turned over to Reds president Kearns and the offer accepted by the team's stockholders — with only approval by league owners holding up final transfer of the team. "If this so the Red officials got well out of the 'red' from the disastrous season last year, and also made a few dollars to boot," a Cincinnati sports columnist remarked.

== Schedule ==
Game	Date	Opponent	Result	Record	Venue	Attendance	Recap	Sources
1	September 9	at Pittsburgh Pirates	**L** 0–13	0–1	Forbes Field	14,164	Recap	
2	September 23	**Chicago Cardinals**	**L** 0–9	0–2	Triangle Park	6,000	Recap	
3	September 30	**Chicago Bears**	**L** 3–21	0–3	Crosley Field	5,500	Recap	
4	October 7	**Chicago Cardinals**	**L** 0–16	0–4	Corcoran Stadium	2,500	Recap	
5	October 14	at **Green Bay Packers**	**L** 0–41	0–5	City Stadium	3,000	Recap	
6	October 21	at **Chicago Bears**	**L** 7–41	0–6	Wrigley Field	11,000	Recap	
7	October 28	**Detroit Lions**	**L** 0–38	0–7	Universal Stadium	4,800	Recap	
8	November 6	at Philadelphia Eagles	**L** 0–64	0–8	Temple Stadium	2,000	Recap	
**Final three games played as St. Louis Gunners**

Game	Date	Opponent	Result	Record	Venue	Attendance	Recap	Sources
9	November 11	Pittsburgh Pirates	**W** 6–0	1–0	Sportsman's Park	13,678	Recap	
10	November 18	at **Detroit Lions**	**L** 7–40	1–1	U of Detroit Stadium	13,000	Recap	
11	December 2	**Green Bay Packers**	**L** 14–21	1–2	Sportsman's Park	6,300	Recap	
Note: Intra-division opponents are in **bold** text. November 6: Tuesday.

== Standings ==
Eagles end Joe Carter (L) recovers a Cincinnati fumble in their final game, an NFL record 64-0 blowout loss.

NFL Western Division
	W	L	T	PCT	DIV	PF	PA	STK
Chicago Bears	13	0	0	1.000	8–0	286	86	W13
Detroit Lions	10	3	0	.769	5–3	238	59	L3
Green Bay Packers	7	6	0	.538	4–5	156	112	W1
Chicago Cardinals	5	6	0	.455	4–5	80	84	W1
St. Louis Gunners	1	2	0	.333	0–2	27	61	L2
Cincinnati Reds	0	8	0	.000	0–6	10	243	L8

Note: Tie games were not officially counted in the standings until 1972.
