= Pike, Texas =

- Unincorporated community
- Location within Texas Location within the United States
- Coordinates: 33°19′20″N 96°18′11″W
- Country: United States
- State: Texas
- County: Collin
- Elevation: 627 ft (191 m)
- Time zone: UTC-6 (Central (CST))
  - Summer (DST): UTC-5 (CDT)
- GNIS feature ID: 1380355

Pike is an unincorporated community in Collin County, located in the U.S. state of Texas. According to the Handbook of Texas, the community had a population of 80 in 2000. It is located within the Dallas-Fort Worth Metroplex.

== History ==
The area in what is known as Pike today was established in the early 1860s. It became a small and prosperous church community for local farmers. A post office was established at Pike in 1885 and remained in operation until 1932, when mail was rerouted to Leonard. In 1900, the community had two churches, a Masonic lodge, six stores, a cotton gin, and a blacksmith shop and had over 100 people living in the vicinity. Its zenith was 172 in 1933 and remained at that level until 1945. It went down to 80 from 1980 through 2000.

== Geography ==
Pike is located on Farm to Market Road 981, 4 mi (6.4 km) northeast of Blue Ridge and is less than a mile from the Hunt County line in far-northeastern Collin County.

== Education ==
Pike had its own school in the early 1860s. Today the community is served by the Leonard Independent School District.

== Notable person ==
Father Lumpkin, a former football player, is buried in the community's cemetery.
