= Sam Knox =

American football player (1910–1981)

- Knox with the Detroit Lions

No. 21
- Position: Guard

Personal information
- Born: March 29, 1910; Bow, New Hampshire, U.S.
- Died: May 17, 1981 (aged 71); Chicago, Illinois, U.S.
- Listed height: 6 ft 0 in (1.83 m)
- Listed weight: 213 lb (97 kg)

Career information
- High school: Clark (Hanover, New Hampshire)
- College: Illinois

Career history
- Detroit Lions (1934–1936)

Awards and highlights
- NFL champion (1935)
- Stats at Pro Football Reference

Frank Samuel Knox (March 29, 1910 – May 17, 1981) was an American professional football guard who played three seasons with the Detroit Lions of the National Football League (NFL). He played college football at the University of New Hampshire and the University of Illinois.

== Early life and college ==
Frank Samuel Knox was born on March 29, 1910, in Bow, New Hampshire. He initially attended Concord High School in Concord, New Hampshire before transferring to Phillips Exeter Academy in Exeter, New Hampshire and lastly Clark Preparatory School in Hanover, New Hampshire.

Knox was a member of the New Hampshire Wildcats of the University of New Hampshire from 1930 to 1932. He was a letterman in 1931. He then played for the Illinois Fighting Illini of the University of Illinois in 1933 as part of the school's freshman team. While at Illinois, he was noted for the premature white streak in his hair. In May 1934, heading into his "sophomore" year, the University of Illinois discovered that Knox had lied about being a freshman, ending his college career. Knox later stated "I was relieved when I got caught. I knew I would never get by with it."

== Professional career ==
Knox played in 11 games, starting two, for the Detroit Lions of the National Football League (NFL) during the 1934 season as both a guard and tackle. He appeared in nine games, starting a career-high eight, at guard in 1935. He also played in the 1935 NFL Championship Game, a 26–7 victory over the New York Giants. Knox played in 11 games, starting seven, as a guard during his final NFL season in 1936. In 1973, Knox said that he bet on exhibition games during his time with the Lions, stating "There was a rule against betting, but everyone knew they didn't enforce the rules except in league games." He said that Lions owner George A. Richards also bet on exhibition games.

== Personal life ==
Knox became a sales manager for insect repellants after his NFL career. He later retired as the president of Drackett Products. He was also a part-owner and director of the Cincinnati Bengals. Knox's brother Carl Knox also played football at the University of Illinois.

Knox died on May 17, 1981, in Chicago, Illinois.
