= Bill McWilliams =

American football player (1910–1997)

- Born: November 28, 1910; Dubuque, Iowa, U.S.
- Died: January 21, 1997 (aged 86); Garland, Texas, U.S.
- Batted: Right Threw: Right

MLB debut
- July 8, 1931, for the Boston Red Sox

Last MLB appearance
- July 11, 1931, for the Boston Red Sox

MLB statistics
- Batting average: .000
- Games played: 2
- At bats: 2
- Stats at Baseball Reference

Teams
- Boston Red Sox (1931)

William Henry McWilliams (November 28, 1910 – January 21, 1997) was an American Major League Baseball and National Football League player. He had two at bats for the Boston Red Sox during the 1931 baseball season, and then played for the Detroit Lions in 1934. Attended the University of Iowa.

He was later player/manager of the Dayton Ducks of the Middle Atlantic League during part of the 1941 season.
