= Al Sarafiny =

American football player and coach (1906–1981)

No. 24
- Position: Center

Personal information
- Born: September 2, 1906; Caspian, Michigan, U.S.
- Died: February 11, 1981 (aged 74); Chicago, Illinois, U.S.

Career information
- College: St. Edward's

Career history
- Green Bay Packers (1933)

Career statistics
- Games played: 7
- Games started: 2

Albert Joseph Sarafiny (September 2, 1906 – February 11, 1981) was an American football player and coach. He played college football at St. Edward's University and was the head football coach at his alma mater from 1929 to 1932. Sarafiny played professionally as center in the National Football League (NFL) for one season, in 1933, with Green Bay Packers.

== Head coaching record ==
=== Football ===
Year	Team	Overall	Conference	Standing	Bowl/playoffs
St. Edward's Saints (Texas Conference) (1929–1932)
1929	St. Edward's	5–4–2	4–1	2nd	
1930	St. Edward's	1–4–2	0–3–2	T–5th	
1931	St. Edward's	1–5–1	1–3–1	5th	
1932	St. Edward's	3–5–2	1–2–1	T–3rd	
St. Edward's:		10–18–7	6–9–4		
Total:		10–18–7			
