= Bob Rowe (halfback) =

American football player (1911–1992)

No. 8, 15, 26, 3
- Position: Halfback

Personal information
- Born: May 28, 1911; Jackson, Michigan, U.S.
- Died: December 23, 1992 (aged 81); Slingerlands, New York, U.S.
- Listed height: 6 ft 0 in (1.83 m)
- Listed weight: 198 lb (90 kg)

Career information
- High school: Hillsdale (Hillsdale, Michigan)
- College: Hillsdale (1929–1930); Colgate (1931–1932)

Career history

Playing
- Detroit Lions (1934); Philadelphia Eagles (1935); Orange Tornadoes (1935); Mount Vernon Cardinals (1936)

Coaching
- Pacific (1933) Assistant coach; Colgate (1946) Backfield coach

Awards and highlights
- National champion (1932)

Career statistics
- Games played: 15
- Rushing yards: 65
- Rushing touchdowns: 2
- Receptions: 1
- Receiving yards: 4
- Passing attempts: 13
- Passing completions: 1
- Completion percentage: 9.1%
- TD–INT: 0–2
- Passing yards: 6
- Stats at Pro Football Reference

Robert Casper Rowe (May 28, 1911 – December 23, 1992) was an American former professional football halfback who played in the National Football League (NFL) with the Detroit Lions and Philadelphia Eagles. He played college football for the Hillsdale Chargers and Colgate Red Raiders.

== Early life ==
Rowe was born on May 28, 1911, in Jackson, Michigan. He attended Hillsdale High School in Hillsdale, Michigan.

== College career ==
Rowe played college football for the Hillsdale Chargers from 1929 to 1930 and Colgate Red Raiders from 1931 to 1932. He was a two-year letterman from 1931 to 1932. Rowe also played basketball at Hillsdale. In 1933, Rowe played in the East–West Shrine Game.

== Professional career ==
=== Detroit Lions ===
On June 17, 1934, Rowe signed with the Detroit Lions of the National Football League (NFL). He played in 11 games, where he rushed for 44 yards and had one catch for four yards.

=== Philadelphia Eagles ===
On April 19, 1935, the Philadelphia Eagles purchased Rowe. In four games, he had 21 rushing yards and threw for six yards on 1-of-11 passing and two interceptions. On October 17, Rowe was released by the team.

=== Orange Tornadoes ===
After Rowe was released from the Eagles, he played with the Orange Tornadoes in 1935.

=== Mount Vernon Cardinals ===
In 1936, Rowe played a season with the Mount Vernon Cardinals of the American Football Association. He scored one rushing touchdown.

== Coaching career ==
=== College of the Pacific ===
Rowe was brought on as an assistant coach for the 1934 season at the College of the Pacific.

=== Colgate ===
Rowe was the backfield coach for the 1946 season at Colgate University.

== Personal life ==
Rowe served in the Army from 1941 to 1945 in World War II, reaching the rank of staff sergeant. In January 1945, his family revealed that he was wounded in action during combat in Europe.
