= Bob Emerick =

American football player (1913–2003)

No. 23
- Position: Guard/Tackle

Personal information
- Born: February 21, 1912; Stockton, California, U.S.
- Died: September 28, 2003 (aged 91); Charlotte, North Carolina, U.S.
- Listed height: 6 ft 2 in (1.88 m)
- Listed weight: 225 lb (102 kg)

Career information
- College: Miami (OH)

Career history
- Detroit Lions (1934); Cleveland Rams (1937)
- Stats at Pro Football Reference

Bob Emerick (February 21, 1913 – September 28, 2003) was an American football player who spent two years in the National Football League (NFL).
