= Jack Johnson (tackle) =

American football player (1909–1978)

- Jack Johnson, 1937

Profile
- Position: Offensive tackle

Personal information
- Born: November 28, 1909; Grantsville, Utah, U.S.
- Died: October 27, 1978 (aged 68); Tooele, Utah, U.S.

Career information
- College: Utah

Career history
- Detroit Lions (1934–1940)

Awards and highlights
- NFL champion (1935); Pro Bowl (1939)

Career statistics
- Games played: 76
- Games started: 63
- Touchdowns: 2

John Denoil Johnson (November 28, 1909 – October 27, 1978) was an American professional football player who was an offensive tackle for seven seasons for the Detroit Lions. He was inducted into the Utah Sports Hall of Fame in 1970.

== Early life and education ==
John Denoil Johnson was born on November 28, 1909. His parents were Alexander Johnson and Alice Anderson.

Johnson attended high school in Grantsville. In 1928, he was named All-State Center for basketball.

In the 1930s, Johnson attended the University of Utah, where he was a member of the American football, basketball, track, and wrestling teams. In 1933, he was awarded the first Mr. Ute Award by the university's Utah Chronicle newspaper and named its outstanding athlete of the year. That year, he was also selected to play in the All-Star game at the Chicago World's Fair and the East–West Shrine Game.

== Career ==
Johnson played for the Detroit Lions from 1934 to 1940, being part of the 1935 Championship team. He coached at Pueblo Junior College in Pueblo, Colorado. He taught at Tooele High School for two years and at Grantsville for one year.

In 1970, he was inducted into the Utah Sports Hall of Fame.

== Personal life ==
In 1936, Johnson married Ida Cadell. They later divorced and he married Virginia Barrus Davis in 1954. He had a son and a daughter.

Johnson died in Tooele on October 27, 1978. He was 68 years old.
