= Russ Lay =

American football player (1911–1965)

- Russell Lay, 1932

Profile
- Positions: Guard, tackle

Personal information
- Born: January 22, 1907; Williamston, Michigan
- Died: September 27, 1965 (aged 58); Lake City, Michigan
- Listed height: 5 ft 11 in (1.80 m)
- Listed weight: 198 lb (90 kg)

Career information
- High school: Williamston (MI)
- College: Michigan State University

Career history
- Cincinnati Reds (1934); St. Louis Gunners (1934); Detroit Lions (1934)
- Stats at Pro Football Reference

Russell M. Lay (January 22, 1907 – September 27, 1965) was an American football player.

Lay was born in Williamston, Michigan in 1907, and attended Williamston High School.

He played college football for Michigan State College (later known as Michigan State University) from 1931 to 1933.

Lay signed with the Detroit Lions in June 1934. He appeared in two games for the Lions. In mid-October 1935, he joined the Cincinnati Reds, starting one game. In mid-November 1935, Lay was sold to the St. Louis Gunners. He started one game for the Gunners.

Lay served in the Navy during World War II. After the war, he operated a used car dealership in Lansing. He later sold his interest in the dealership and moved to Lake City, Michigan. He died in 1965 in Lake City.
