= Frank Christensen =

American football player (1910–2001)

Profile
- Position: Fullback

Personal information
- Born: June 1, 1910; Salt Lake City, Utah, U.S.
- Died: September 6, 2001 (aged 91); Salt Lake City, Utah, U.S.
- Listed height: 6 ft 1 in (1.85 m)
- Listed weight: 199 lb (90 kg)

Career information
- High school: Granite
- College: Utah (1930–1932)

Career history
- Detroit Lions (1934–1937)

Awards and highlights
- NFL champion (1935); First-team All-American (1932); Third-team All-American (1930)
- Stats at Pro Football Reference

Frank Langton "Chris" Christensen (June 1, 1910 – September 6, 2001) was an American athlete. After receiving all-state honors at Granite High School in baseball, football, and basketball, Christensen played fullback at the University of Utah. "Crashing Chris" was the university's first three-time All-American. In 1930–31, he was named Third-team All-American, and in 1932 he earned First-team honors. During those years, the Utes owned a 21-3-1 record.

Christensen holds the school's all-time career-scoring mark with 235 points. He is second in individual points in a season, scoring 100 points in 1930. Christensen is credited with scoring 13 points in 13 seconds vs. Colorado College.

The fullback was honored as a Silver Anniversary All-American in Sports Illustrated.

Christensen went on to the pros with the Detroit Lions (1934–37), where he was a member of the 1935 World Championship team.

Christensen was also successful in business. He helped revolutionize the mining and petroleum industry and is recognized as the driving force behind the introduction of diamond drill bits into the petroleum exploration industry. Originally, the company manufactured diamond drill bits for the western mining industry, but the founders quickly envisioned a strong market in petroleum. By 1946, Christensen diamond bits were introduced into the Rangley field of Colorado. The bits were so successful the company decided to make petroleum drilling its primary market. His company, Christensen Diamond Products Company, became the world's largest producer of industrial diamond products.

By the 1960s, the company was expanding into international markets. Christensen also developed an erosion-resistant matrix for diamond bits and introduced the 250P-core barrel system that quickly became the industry standard. In the 1970s, downhole tools and motors formed the basis for a broader drilling package that included the Navi-Drill downhole motor. Later in the decade, Christensen Diamond Products introduced the synthetic polycrystalline diamond compact (PDC) bit.

In 1978, Christensen Diamond Products was acquired by Norton Co. of Worcester, Massachusetts, and in 1983 the company's name was changed to Norton Christensen. Norton Christensen merged with Eastman Whipstock, the world's largest directional drilling company, in 1986 to form Eastman Christensen. In 1990, Eastman Christensen was acquired by Baker Hughes, who subsequently merged the company with its Hughes Tool Company to form Hughes Christensen.

Christensen died on September 6, 2001, at the age of 91.
