= Gene Alford =

American football player (1905–1975)

Profile
- Position: Running back

Personal information
- Born: April 3, 1905; Rising Star, Texas
- Died: December 1975
- Listed weight: 185 lb (84 kg)

Career information
- College: Texas Tech

Career history
- Portsmouth Spartans (1931–1933); Cincinnati Reds (1934); St. Louis Gunners (1934)

Career statistics
- Rushing attempts-yards: 40-136
- Receptions-yards: 5-98
- Touchdowns: 3
- Stats at Pro Football Reference

Eugene Morris Alford (April 3, 1905 – December 1975) was an American professional football player who played running back in the NFL for four seasons for the Portsmouth Spartans and the Cincinnati Reds. Alford played for the Texas Tech Matadors (later known as Red Raiders) in 1925, Tech's first football season, and is listed in the Texas Tech football media guide as a one-year letterman. He later played professionally in the NFL for Portsmouth, Cincinnati and the St. Louis Gunners from 1931 to 1934.
