= John Schneller =

American football player (1911–1978)

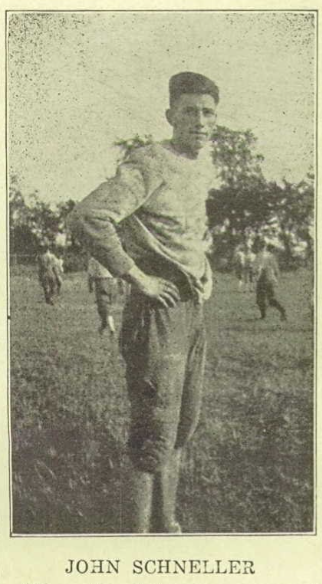

No. 30, 12
- Position: End

Personal information
- Born: November 1, 1911; Neenah, Wisconsin, U.S.
- Died: November 6, 1978 (aged 67); Cleveland, Ohio, U.S.
- Listed height: 6 ft 2 in (1.88 m)
- Listed weight: 204 lb (93 kg)

Career information
- High school: Neenah (WI)
- College: Wisconsin

Awards and highlights
- NFL champion (1935)
- Stats at Pro Football Reference

John Benjamin Schneller (November 1, 1911 – November 6, 1978) was a National Football League (NFL) player for the Portsmouth Spartans/Detroit Lions from 1933 to 1936, playing end on offense and defense.

== Early life ==
Schneller was born on November 1, 1911, in Neenah, Wisconsin. He attended the University of Wisconsin on a basketball scholarship, but upon arriving on campus was recruited to play football. He then played as a fullback and end, earning All-American Honorable Mention in his junior year.

== Football career ==
Schneller joined the Portsmouth (Ohio) Spartans in 1933, their last season in the fledgling NFL. The team was then purchased and moved to Detroit, where he played from 1934 to 1936. In 1935, the Detroit Lions won their first NFL championship, beating the New York Giants 26–7. After World War II, Schneller scouted for various NFL teams.

== Higher education and military service ==
Schneller graduated from the University of Wisconsin with a degree in electrical engineering after his NFL playing career was completed.

He later enlisted in the U.S. Navy, where he was assigned to Washington, D.C. to learn top secret codes. He served as a lieutenant, commanding the radar tower, on the USS South Dakota in the Pacific.

== Business career ==
Schneller worked for Owens Corning as a sales manager in the company's fiberglass division.

In 1947, he founded the Duracote Company in Ravenna, Ohio, and in 1964 founded John Schneller & Associates, in Kent, Ohio, which later became known as Schneller, Inc. Today, the company is the largest supplier of commercial aircraft interior decorative laminates in the world.

== Retirement and death ==
Schneller died from lung cancer on November 6, 1978. He was survived by wife of 10 years Ann (Carter) Schneller and two children, son John B. Schneller III, age 31 and daughter Marianne, age 28.

== See also ==
- List of Detroit Lions players
