= Father Lumpkin =

American football player (1907–1974)

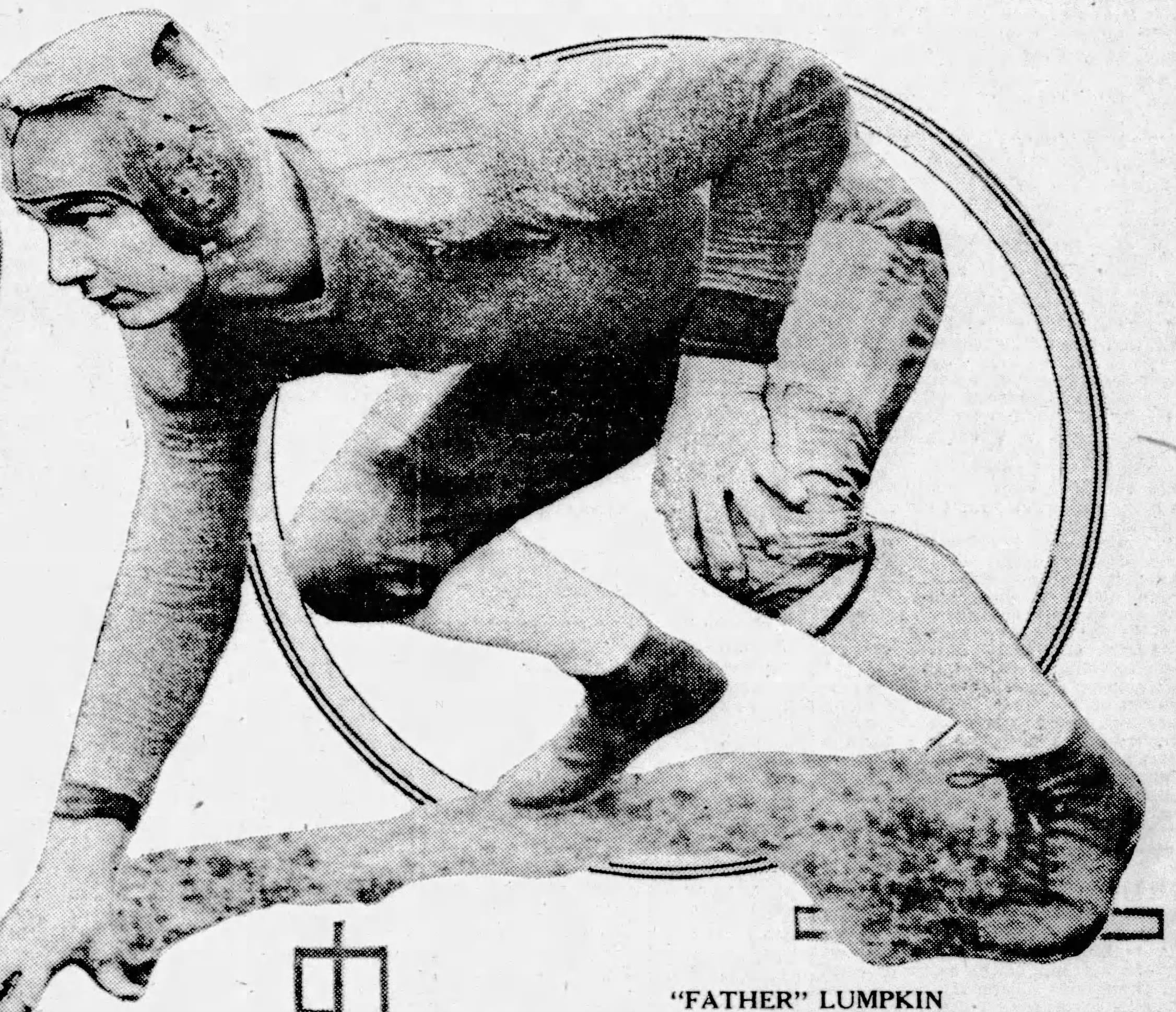

Profile
- Positions: Fullback, Halfback, Quarterback

Personal information
- Born: January 27, 1907; Jefferson, Texas, U.S.
- Died: March 31, 1974 (aged 67); Dallas, Texas, U.S.
- Listed height: 6 ft 2 in (1.88 m)
- Listed weight: 211 lb (96 kg)

Career information
- High school: Dallas (TX) Oak Cliff
- College: Georgia Tech

Career history
- Portsmouth Spartans (1929–1933); Detroit Lions (1934); Brooklyn Dodgers (1935–1937)

Awards and highlights
- National champion (1928)
- Stats at Pro Football Reference

Roy Lee "Father" Lumpkin (January 27, 1907 – March 31, 1974) was an American football player.

A native of Jefferson, Texas, Lumpkin attended high school in Dallas. He played college football for Georgia Tech and was an All-Southern fullback for the undefeated 1928 Georgia Tech Golden Tornado football team that defeated California in the 1929 Rose Bowl.

In 1929, Lumpkin left Georgia Tech to play professional football for the Portsmouth Spartans. He played five seasons for Portsmouth from 1929 to 1933 and was selected as a second-team All-Pro in 1930 and a first-team All-Pro in 1932. He played one season with the Detroit Lions in 1934 after the Spartans moved to Detroit. He scored the first touchdown in Detroit Lions history. He concluded his football career with the Brooklyn Dodgers from 1935 to 1937.

== Early life ==
Lumpkin was born in Jefferson, Texas, in 1907. He was the son of Balcombe Lumpkin and Naomi (Davis) Lumpkin. He attended Oak Cliff High School in Dallas where he played fullback for the football team in 1926.

== College ==
In 1927, Lumpkin enrolled at the Georgia Institute of Technology in Atlanta, planning to study textile engineering. As a freshman in 1927, he was given the nickname "Father" because of his fatherly manner.

As a sophomore, he helped lead the 1928 Georgia Tech Golden Tornado football team to an undefeated season and a victory over California in the 1929 Rose Bowl. Lumpkin also intercepted two passes in a 13–0 victory over Notre Dame. At the end of the season, he was selected as a fullback on the All-Southern team of Nash Higgins, chief football scout and assistant coach for the University of Florida. One writer called Lumpkin "the most powerful individual factor" on the 1928 Georgia Tech team and noted: "This big, fast and powerful backfield star, who is just as valuable as an offensive interferer as a runner, passer and pass-receiver, is the best protectionist we have seen this year in staving off opponents who attempt to reach the player who is carrying the ball."

== Professional football ==
Lumpkin did not return to Georgia Tech for his junior year in 1929. Instead, he joined a professional football team in Ohio called the Portsmouth Spartans. On November 24, 1929, he returned a kickoff 95 yards for a touchdown against the Ironton Tanks. Lumpkin became the star of the 1929 Portsmouth team that compiled a 12-2-1 record.

In 1932, Lumpkin played in the first NFL championship game as Chicago defeated Portsmouth.

Lumpkin remained with the Spartans as they joined the National Football League (NFL) in 1930 and through their move to Detroit as the Detroit Lions in 1934. He earned a reputation as an excellent blocker, leading the way for the Spartans' other backs, Dutch Clark, Glenn Presnell, and Ace Gutowsky. He was also one of the last players in the NFL who refused to wear a helmet. Presnell later recalled: "Probably our most popular player was Father Lumpkin . . . He was one of the toughest human beings I ever saw. I remember seeing him wrestle during the off-season. He was just a very athletic individual. He was a great blocker, and he would say if he didn't take out two men on each play, then he wasn't doing his job. He meant putting them on the ground, not just bump them and go ahead."

Lumpkin was selected as a second-team player on the 1930 All-Pro Team and a first-team player on the 1932 All-Pro Team.

On September 23, 1934, Lumpkin scored the first touchdown in the Detroit Lions' first game, intercepting a pass and returning it 45 yards for a touchdown in a 9-0 victory over the New York Giants before a crowd of 12,000 persons at the University of Detroit Stadium.

In May 1935, the Lions sold Lumpkin to the Brooklyn Dodgers. According to Dutch Clark, the Lions dropped Lumpkin because he refused to give up professional wrestling. He played for Brooklyn from 1935 to 1937.

After spending 1938 as a professional wrestler, he signed in 1939 as the head coach of the Louisville Tanks of the American Professional Football League.

== Later life ==
Lumpkin was married to Inez P. Lumpkin. After retiring from football, Lumpkin and his wife lived in Dallas. In his later years, Lumpkin sold bowling supplies. Lumpkin died in 1974 at age 67 in Dallas. The cause of death was cerebral insufficiency and pneumonia due to recent subendocardial infarction. For the last three-and-a-half years of his life, he suffered from ischemic heart disease with episodes of cardiac arrhythmia. He was buried at Pike Cemetery in Pike, Texas.
