= Clare Randolph =

American football player (1907–1972)

- Randolph in 1935

Profile
- Positions: Center, linebacker

Personal information
- Born: May 2, 1907; Chicago, Illinois, U.S.
- Died: December 24, 1972 (aged 65); Glendale, California, U.S.
- Listed height: 6 ft 2 in (1.88 m)
- Listed weight: 204 lb (93 kg)

Career information
- High school: Elkhart (IL)
- College: Indiana

Career history
- Chicago Cardinals (1930); Portsmouth Spartans / Detroit Lions (1931–1936)

Awards and highlights
- NFL champion (1935); First-team All-Big Ten (1928)

Career statistics
- Games played: 78
- Starts: 50
- Stats at Pro Football Reference

Clare Loring "Dutch" Randolph (May 2, 1907 – December 24, 1972) was an American professional football player who was a center and linebacker for seven seasons for the Chicago Cardinals and the Portsmouth Spartans, as well as Portsmouth's successor organization, the Detroit Lions.

Randolph was part of the 1935 NFL Champion Detroit Lions team. He was inducted into the Indiana Football Hall of Fame in 1984.
