= George Christensen (American football) =

American football player and businessman (1909–1968)

George "Tarzan" Christensen
- Christensen in 1936

No. 27, 47, 14, 25
- Positions: Tackle, guard

Personal information
- Born: December 13, 1909; Pendleton, Oregon, U.S.
- Died: July 1, 1968 (aged 58); Aspen, Colorado, U.S.
- Listed height: 6 ft 2 in (1.88 m)
- Listed weight: 238 lb (108 kg)

Career information
- High school: Pendleton (OR)
- College: Oregon

Career history
- Portsmouth Spartans / Detroit Lions (1931–1938)

Awards and highlights
- NFL champion (1935); NFL 1930s All-Decade Team; Second-team All-PCC (1930)

Career statistics
- Games played: 95
- Starts: 74
- Stats at Pro Football Reference

George Washington "Tarzan" Christensen (December 13, 1909 – July 1, 1968) was an American football player and businessman. He played college football for the University of Oregon and professional football for the Portsmouth Spartans (1931–1933) and their successor, the Detroit Lions (1934–1938). He later formed the Christensen Diamond Products Company, which became a publicly traded company manufacturing industrial, drilling and military equipment with plants in Europe, Asia, South America and North America.

== Early life ==
Christensen was born in Pendleton, Oregon in 1909. He attended Pendleton Prep and Aberdeen Prep before enrolling at the University of Oregon. He played college football as a tackle for the Oregon Ducks from 1928 to 1930. At the end of the 1930 season, Christensen was selected as an All-Pacific Coast player. He also played for the Western All-Stars in the annual East-West Shrine Game.

== Professional football ==
Christensen played professional football in the National Football League for eight years for the Portsmouth Spartans (1931–1933) and the Detroit Lions (1934–1938). He started in 74 of 95 games that he played. He was selected as a first-team All-NFL player in 1931, 1933, 1934 and 1936, and a second-team All-NFL player in 1932 and 1935. He was also the captain of the first Detroit Lions professional football team in 1934 and was a starter on the 1935 Detroit Lions team that won the 1935 NFL Championship Game. Teammate Glenn Presnell recalled, "George Christensen was a good tackle, he weighed about 230 and was the biggest man on the team."

In 1969, the Associated Press selected all-decade teams to commemorate the NFL's 30th anniversary. Christensen was named as one of five tackles on the All-1930s teams.

In July 1939, Christensen was hired as the line coach for the Brooklyn Dodgers.

Christensen is one of ten players that were named to the National Football League 1930s All-Decade Team that have not been inducted into the Pro Football Hall of Fame.

== Christensen Diamond Products ==
After retiring from football, Christensen became employed by Koebel Diamond tools, which sold diamond tools to the automotive companies in Detroit.

In 1944, Christensen went into business with his former teammate, Frank Christensen, to whom he was not related. The two men began manufacturing diamond bits as the Christensen Diamond Products Company in Salt Lake City. George was responsible for procuring diamonds for the business, eventually negotiating a direct allocation from the DeBeers diamond syndicate.

In 1946, the company introduced diamond core bits to the mining industry. The company had a technological breakthrough in the late 1940s when it perfected a tungsten carbide matrix for diamond bits at an oil field in Colorado. The two men also formed Christensen Machine Company, which later became Hughes Christensen, to manufacture precision tools and gauges for military ordnance and radar. In 1957 Christensen Diamond Products opened a manufacturing plant in Celle, West Germany to serve international markets. Eventually, the Christensens' operations became international with manufacturing plants in Canada, France, Germany, and Japan.

== Death ==
In 1968, he died at his home in Colorado of a heart attack at age 58.
