= Jack Manders =

American football player (1909–1977)

- Manders in 1936

No. 10
- Positions: Halfback; Fullback; Kicker

Personal information
- Born: January 13, 1909; Milbank, South Dakota, U.S.
- Died: January 29, 1977 (aged 68); Chicago, Illinois, U.S.
- Listed height: 6 ft 0 in (1.83 m)
- Listed weight: 203 lb (92 kg)

Career information
- High school: Milbank (SD)
- College: Minnesota

Career history
- Chicago Bears (1933–1940)

Awards and highlights
- 2× NFL champion (1933, 1940); 2× First-team All-Pro (1934, 1937); 2× NFL scoring leader (1934, 1937); Third-team All-American (1932); First-team All-Big Ten (1931); 2× Second-team All-Big Ten (1930, 1932); Helms Athletic Foundation Hall of Fame (1969)

Career statistics
- Games played: 93
- Games started: 42
- Rushing yards: 1,586 (3.5 average)
- Rushing touchdowns: 11
- Receiving yards: 260 (17.3 average)
- Receiving touchdowns: 6
- Field goals: 19-for-40 (47.5%)
- Stats at Pro Football Reference

John Albert "Automatic Jack" Manders (January 13, 1909 – January 29, 1977) was an American football player. He played professionally in the National Football League (NFL) for the Chicago Bears from 1933 to 1940.

A kicking savant in the era of one-platoon football, Manders gained his "Automatic" moniker kicking an NFL record 72 consecutive points after touchdown, dating from his entry into the league in the first game of 1933. In his 8-season NFL career he scored a total of 368 points — 19 touchdowns, 40 field goals, and 134 points after touchdown — again an NFL individual record. He had 15 winning kicks in his career, a record at the time he retired. In the inaugural 1933 NFL Championship Game, Manders scored the first ever points of the game on a field goal; he went 3-of-4 in field goals and kicked two extra points in the historic 23–21 victory.

Article on "Automatic Jack" Manders, Bears kicker, from Pro Football Illustrated, Fall 1941. Photo at top illustrates the point-blank nature of PAT kicks, booted from the 10 through goalposts on the goal line.

Manders began his NFL career as a fullback but was moved by Bears head coach George Halas to the halfback position in 1937. He was used primarily as a blocker during the 1939 and 1940 Bears seasons and was slated to be moved from the backfield to the line to play as a guard in 1941.

Manders was the second pro football player to appear on a Wheaties box. He was also a member of the Chicago team coached by George Halas that defeated the Washington Redskins in the 1940 NFL Championship Game by the memorable score of 73–0.

He was the older brother of Clarence "Pug" Manders, who played contemporaneously as a blocking back for the NFL's Brooklyn Dodgers.
