= Ox Emerson =

American football player and coach (1907–1998)

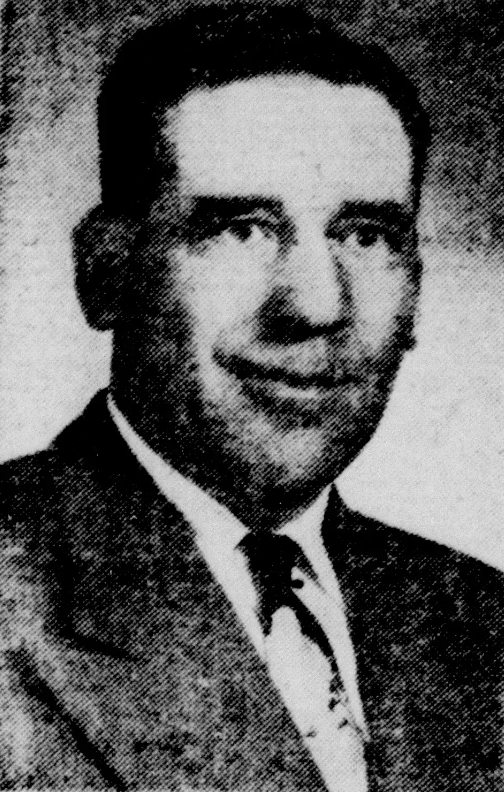
- Emerson in the 1950s

No. 7, 20, 45
- Positions: Guard, center, linebacker

Personal information
- Born: December 18, 1907; Douglass, Texas, U.S.
- Died: November 26, 1998 (aged 90); Austin, Texas, U.S.
- Listed height: 5 ft 11 in (1.80 m)
- Listed weight: 203 lb (92 kg)

Career information
- High school: Orange (Orange, Texas)
- College: Texas

Career history
- Portsmouth Spartans / Detroit Lions (1931–1937); Brooklyn Dodgers (1938)

Awards and highlights
- NFL champion (1935); 6× First-team All-Pro (1932–1937); NFL 1930s All-Decade Team; Detroit Lions All-Time Team; All-SWC Guard (1930); Texas Longhorn Hall of Honor

Career statistics
- Games played: 86
- Stats at Pro Football Reference

Grover Conner “Ox” Emerson (December 18, 1907 – November 26, 1998) was an American football player.

== Early life and college career ==
Born and raised in rural East Texas, Emerson played high school football at Orange High School. Supposedly, his nickname came from a mistake in a high school game that saw him called a "big dumb ox."

He later played starting left guard on the Texas Longhorns team of 1929 and 1930 under coach Clyde Littlefield. He garnered all-Southwest Conference honors in 1930. He expected to play for the Longhorns in the 1931 season and was to be the team captain but he had participated in two plays with the varsity in the 1928 Baylor game and was declared ineligible for the 1931 season. He was inducted into the Hall of Honor in 1966.

== NFL career ==
He began his pro career with the Portsmouth Spartans in 1931 for a salary of $75 per game. In 1934, the Spartans became the Detroit Lions, and the resulting season saw the team start off with seven consecutive shutouts. Notably, the November 4 game versus Pittsburgh saw the Lions run for a still-standing record of 426 yards. The following team had the leading rusher in Ernie Caddel with 621 yards from scrimmage while the Lions rolled to the 1935 NFL Championship. With Emerson blocking and leading the way the 1936 Lions team set a rushing record of 2,885 yards in a twelve-game season, a record that lasted 36 years. It was finally broken by the Miami Dolphins in 1972 in a fourteen-game season. Emerson retired in 1937 to become line coach under Potsy Clark for the Brooklyn Dodgers, but then briefly returned as player.

In an era where linemen were around the weight of 210-240 pounds (by 1975, linemen were now 240-300 pounds) that wore leather helmets and played both ways due to the limited size of the roster, Emerson was selected as a First-team All-Pro five times in his career. When he retired, he was one of only six players with five First-team All-Pro selections in NFL history.

== After football ==
Finally retiring in 1939, Emerson returned to Detroit, working in the personnel department of the Ford Motor Company and coaching at Wayne State University. During World War II he served his country in the U.S. Navy in 1942 and attained the rank of lieutenant commander. He served on the aircraft carrier USS Block Island, which was sunk in the Atlantic by German submarine U-549. Transferred back to the United States, Emerson coached the Naval Air Station Corpus Christi team until his discharge.

He stayed in Corpus Christi coaching Alice High School (1947-1949, where he went 25-6-1) and Del Mar Junior College until he took the freshman coaching position at the University of Texas at Austin in 1951. Supposedly, the wishbone formation owed its creation to Emerson as Emory Bellard was an assistant coach to Emerson when he saw a guard being placed behind the line in order for the player to have room for running and blocking; Bellard later became an assistant to Darrell Royal at Texas and made a suggestion about using what he saw in high school under Emerson. Emerson remained at Texas until the end of the 1956 football season and returned to high school coaching in the Austin, Texas area. Apparently, Emerson was a key advocate for the Detroit Lions to draft Harley Sewell (a linebacker that prospects had doubts due to his size) in 1953, reportedly stating that if Sewell didn't make the team, he would personally pay his salary out of his pocket (the Lions selected Sewell for their first round pick and he proceeded to play ten seasons with the team as a guard). He coached at Texas until 1956. He served as head coach at Austin Johnston High in 1960 before becoming the first ever head coach at Austin Lanier High School. He went 35-51-5 (with all but three of his victories coming in Class 3A before the move up to 4A) while winning two district championships. He retired from the position in 1969 but stayed on as a fulltime teacher. In 1970, Emerson attended a celebration of the old days of pro football being in Portsmouth, Ohio. In 1976, he coached football and taught American history at St. Louis Catholic School until his final retirement in 1985. On November 26, 1998, Emerson died of pneumonia in Austin at the age of 90. Services were held at Weed-Corley-Fish Funeral Home on December 1.

The Professional Football Researchers Association named Emerson to the PRFA Hall of Very Good Class of 2010.

Emerson was selected to the National Football League 1930s All-Decade Team in 1969. He is one of ten players named to the All-Decade Team that have not been inducted into the Pro Football Hall of Fame. He was a Hall of Fame Finalist in 2020 and a nominee again in 2023.
