= Bill McKalip =

American football player (1907–1993)

No. 10, 8
- Position: End/Halfback

Personal information
- Born: June 5, 1907; Pittsburgh, Pennsylvania, U.S.
- Died: July 11, 1993 (aged 86); Corvallis, Oregon, U.S.
- Listed height: 6 ft 1 in (1.85 m)
- Listed weight: 195 lb (88 kg)

Career information
- High school: Oakland Tech (Oakland, California)
- College: Oregon State

Career history
- 1931–1932: Portsmouth Spartans
- 1934, 1936: Detroit Lions

Awards and highlights
- 2× First-team All-Pro (1931, 1934); Third-team All-American (1930); First-team All-PCC (1930); Oregon Sports Hall of Fame (1991); OSU Hall of Fame (1990)

William Ward McKalip (June 5, 1907 – July 11, 1993) is an American former professional football player who was an end and half back for four seasons in the National Football League (NFL) with the Portsmouth Spartans/Detroit Lions. He played college football for the Oregon State Beavers.

== College career ==
McKalip attended Oregon State University for his college education and to play football. He lettered in football with the Beavers. He received first-team honors from the Newspaper Enterprise Association on the 1930 All-Pacific Coast football team he earned All-Pacific Coast Conference and second-team All-West Coast honors from the United Press. He was also chosen to play in the 1930 East-West Shrine Game.

== Professional career ==
McKalip played in the NFL for four seasons, two with the Portsmouth Spartans and two after they became the Detroit Lions. During his time with the program, he was a two-time All-Pro selection in 1931 and 1934. In the 1931 season, he had 4 receiving touchdowns.

== Legacy ==
McKalip was named to the Oregon Sports Hall of Fame in 1991 and the Oregon State University Hall of Fame in 1990, both for his football prowess. He died in Corvallis, Oregon, on July 11, 1993.
