= Buster Mitchell =

American football player (1906–1964)

Profile
- Position: End

Personal information
- Born: February 16, 1906; Irene, Texas, U.S.
- Died: March 4, 1964 (aged 58); Nolan County, Texas, U.S.
- Listed height: 6 ft 0 in (1.83 m)
- Listed weight: 206 lb (93 kg)

Career information
- High school: Sweetwater (TX)
- College: Davis & Elkins College

Career history
- Portsmouth Spartans (1931–1933); Detroit Lions (1934–1935); New York Giants (1935–1936); Brooklyn Dodgers (1937)

Awards and highlights
- NFL champion (1935); All-Pro (1934)

Career statistics
- Receptions: 13
- Receiving yards: 169
- Touchdowns: 1
- Stats at Pro Football Reference

Granville Myrick "Buster" Mitchell (February 16, 1906 – March 4, 1964) was a professional American football end in the National Football League. He played seven seasons for the Portsmouth Spartans (1931–1933), the Detroit Lions (1934–1935), the New York Giants (1935–1936), and the Brooklyn Dodgers (1937).
