= Joe Zeller =

American football player (1908–1983)

Profile
- Positions: Guard, end

Personal information
- Born: May 2, 1908; East Chicago, Indiana, U.S.
- Died: September 23, 1983 (aged 75); Chicago, Illinois, U.S.

Career information
- College: Indiana

Career history
- 1932: Green Bay Packers
- 1933–1938: Chicago Bears

Awards and highlights
- Second-team All-American (1931)

Joseph Thomas Zeller (May 2, 1908 – September 23, 1983) was an American football player. He played professional in the National Football League (NFL) with the Green Bay Packers for one season and the Chicago Bears for six seasons.

== College sport career ==
Zeller was an outstanding athlete at Indiana University Bloomington, playing both football and basketball. He is the only person to have won the prestigious Balfour Award for the most valuable player in both sports in the same year, 1931–32, when he was also senior class president. Zeller finished his college career by playing every minute of his final five games.

Zeller was inducted to the Indiana University Hall of Fame in 2011.
