= Frank McNally (American football) =

American football player (1907–1993)

Profile
- Position: Center

Personal information
- Born: March 19, 1907; Rye Patch, Nevada
- Died: February 5, 1993 (aged 85); Delray Beach, Florida
- Listed height: 6 ft 1 in (1.85 m)
- Listed weight: 203 lb (92 kg)

Career information
- High school: Madera (CA)
- College: Saint Mary's (CA)

Career history
- Chicago Cardinals (1931–1934)

Awards and highlights
- All-Pro (1931)

Career statistics
- Games played: 36
- Games started: 21
- Touchdowns: 1
- Stats at Pro Football Reference

Francis Joseph McNally (March 19, 1907 – February 5, 1993) was a professional American football offensive lineman in the National Football League. He played four seasons for the Chicago Cardinals (1931–1934).
