= Lou Gordon (American football) =

American football player (1908–1976)

Profile
- Positions: Tackle, guard, end

Personal information
- Born: July 15, 1908; Chicago, Illinois, U.S.
- Died: April 4, 1976 (aged 67); Chicago, Illinois, U.S.
- Listed height: 6 ft 5 in (1.96 m)
- Listed weight: 224 lb (102 kg)

Career information
- High school: Lane Tech (Chicago)
- College: Illinois

Career history
- Chicago Cardinals (1930); Brooklyn Dodgers (1931); Chicago Cardinals (1931–1935); Green Bay Packers (1936–1937); Chicago Bears (1938)

Awards and highlights
- NFL champion (1936); National champion (1927); First-team All-American (1929); First-team All-Big Ten (1929)

Career statistics
- Games played: 83
- starts: 56
- Stats at Pro Football Reference

Louis James Gordon (July 15, 1908 – April 4, 1976) was an American professional football lineman. He played college football for the Illinois Fighting Illini and in the National Football League (NFL) for the Chicago Cardinals, Brooklyn Dodgers, Green Bay Packers, and Chicago Bears.

== Biography ==
Gordon was born in Chicago, Illinois, and was Jewish.

He played college football at the University of Illinois, where Gordon was a consensus All-American tackle in 1929.

A lineman, Gordon played nine seasons in the National Football League. He was a four-time all-league selection was captain of the Cardinals for three seasons. Because helmets gave him headaches, he often played without a helmet. His career ended after he suffered a badly broken leg in his only Bears season.

== Hall of fame ==
Gordon was inducted into the Chicago Jewish Sports Hall of Fame.

== See also ==
- List of select Jewish football players
