= Maury Bodenger =

American football player (1909–1960)

Profile
- Position: Offensive lineman

Personal information
- Born: July 31, 1909; New Orleans, Louisiana, US
- Died: February 10, 1960 (aged 50); Cleveland Heights, Ohio, US

Career information
- College: Tulane

Career history
- 1931–1934: Portsmouth Spartans/Detroit Lions

Awards and highlights
- All-Southern (1929, 1930)

Maury "Bodie" Bodenger (1909–1960) was an American professional football player who played offensive lineman for three seasons for the Portsmouth Spartans/Detroit Lions. He played college football at Tulane, where he earned All-Southern honors. He was Jewish.
