= Luke Johnsos =

American football player and coach (1905–1984)

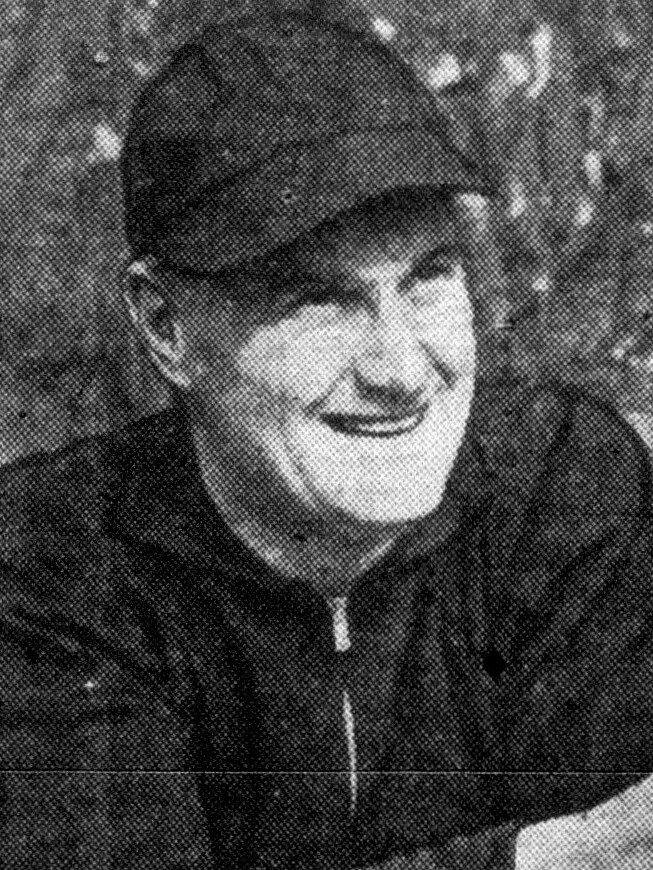
- Johnsos, circa 1942.

No. 24
- Position: End

Personal information
- Born: December 9, 1905; Chicago, Illinois, U.S.
- Died: December 10, 1984 (aged 79); Evanston, Illinois, U.S.
- Listed height: 6 ft 2 in (1.88 m)
- Listed weight: 195 lb (88 kg)

Career information
- High school: Carl Schurz (Chicago)
- College: Northwestern

Career history

Playing
- Chicago Bears (1929–1936)

Coaching
- Chicago Bears (1937–1942) Assistant coach; Chicago Bears (1942–1945) Co-head coach; Chicago Bears (1946–1969) Assistant coach

Operations
- Chicago Bears (1969–1974) Director of technical research

Awards and highlights
- Player: Big Ten champion (1926); 2× NFL champion (1932, 1933); 2× First-team All-Pro (1930, 1931); NFL receiving touchdowns co-leader (1933); 100 greatest Bears of All-Time; Coach: 5× NFL champion (1940, 1941, 1943, 1946, 1963)

Career NFL statistics
- Games played: 99
- Starts: 64
- Receiving yards: 985 (17.0 average)
- Receiving touchdowns: 20
- Stats at Pro Football Reference

Head coaching record
- Regular season: 23–11–2 (.667)
- Postseason: 1–1 (.500)
- Career: 24–12–2 (.658)
- Coaching profile at Pro Football Reference

Luke Andrew Johnsos Sr. (December 9, 1905 – December 10, 1984) was an American professional football player, assistant coach, and head coach for the Chicago Bears of the National Football League (NFL). He started with the Bears in 1929 at the age of 23 as an end. He played eight seasons in Chicago finishing his playing career in 1936. He then spent 32 years as a Bears coach, including three as co-head coach during World War II.

== Playing career ==
Johnsos graduated from Schurz High School in Chicago in 1924, while there he played football and baseball. After graduation, he went to Northwestern University and lettered in basketball, baseball, and football, earning nine letters in total.

Johnsos during his playing days with the Chicago Bears.

In 1929, he was signed by the Bears when Northwestern teammate Walter Holmer insisted he be part of the conditions; while Holmer was paid $5,000 as a salary, Johnsos received only $100 upon joining the team, which he commented was because George Halas felt he "wasn't worth [a higher pay]." Johnsos also signed a baseball contract with the Cincinnati Reds, but did not play due to eyesight problems.

As a player for the Bears, he was named All-Pro twice. Nicknamed "Professor" and the "Bears' Brain Trust", Johnsos was praised by his peers for his knowledge of the game. Teammate Red Grange also called him "one of the best ends in the league and a great pass receiver."

== Coaching career ==
In 1937, with his playing career now over, Johnsos became an assistant coach for the Bears.

Following the October 25, 1942 victory over the Philadelphia Eagles, the Bears' twelfth victory in a row, Halas turned his team over to Johnsos and fellow assistant Hunk Anderson as he left to serve in World War II. With Anderson and Johnsos leading the team, the Bears won the 1943 NFL Championship Game. Before the 1945 season, Johnsos received an offer to take over as head coach of the Cleveland Rams, but declined as he wished to stay in Chicago. Halas re-assumed head coaching duties in 1946 and Johnsos returned to his assistant role. In 1949, rumors surfaced of Johnsos becoming head coach of the Chicago Cardinals, though Halas denied it and Johnsos said he had not received an offer.

The Bears won the 1963 NFL Championship Game over the New York Giants with the help of a play designed by Johnsos nicknamed the "Ditka Special"; on third down late in the game, tight end Mike Ditka caught a pass that placed the Bears on the Giants' one-yard line. Quarterback Bill Wade scored the game-winning touchdown on the next play.

Johnsos retired from coaching after the 1969 season, ending 40 years at field level with the Bears. He remained involved in the organization as the director of technical research, replacing the late Paddy Driscoll, and served in the position through 1974.

== Personal life ==
Johnsos was a former owner of the printing company Johnsos-Coppock Printing, which he later sold to Bagcraft Corp. of America but remained as an executive until late 1984. Two weeks after departing the company, he died on December 10 at the age of 79. He was survived by his wife Rosemary, four daughters, a son, and 15 grandchildren.

== Head coaching record ==
Team	Year	Regular season					Postseason			
Team	Year	Won	Lost	Ties	Win %	Finish	Won	Lost	Win %	Result
CHI	1942	11	0	0	1.000	1st in NFL Western	0	1	.000	Lost to Washington Redskins in NFL Championship Game.
CHI	1943	8	1	1	.850	1st in NFL Western	1	0	1.000	1943 NFL Champions
CHI	1944	6	3	1	.650	2nd in NFL Western	–	–	–	–
CHI	1945	3	7	0	.300	4th in NFL Western	–	–	–	–
Total		23	11	2	.667		1	1	.500	–
