= Glenn Presnell =

American football player, coach, and administrator (1905–2004)

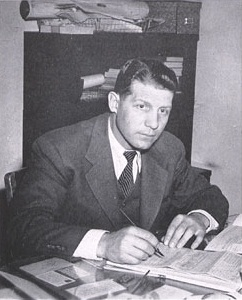
- Presnell from 1943 Cornhusker

Biographical details
- Born: July 28, 1905; Gilead, Nebraska, U.S.
- Died: September 13, 2004 (aged 99); Ironton, Ohio, U.S.

Playing career
- 1925–1927: Nebraska
- 1929–1930: Ironton Tanks
- 1931–1936: Portsmouth Spartans/Detroit Lions
- Position: Halfback

Coaching career (HC unless noted)
- 1936: Lawrence Tech
- 1937: Kansas (backfield)
- 1938–1941: Nebraska (backfield)
- 1942: Nebraska
- 1944: North Carolina Pre-Flight (backfield)
- 1946: Nebraska (assistant)
- 1947–1953: Eastern Kentucky (assistant)
- 1954–1963: Eastern Kentucky

Administrative career (AD unless noted)
- 1943: Nebraska (acting AD)
- 1963–1971: Eastern Kentucky

Head coaching record
- Overall: 45–61–4
- Bowls: 0–1

Accomplishments and honors

Championships
- 2 OVC (1954, 1962)

Awards
- First-team All-Pro (1933); NFL rushing touchdowns leader (1933); NFL scoring leader (1933); Second-team All-American (1927); 2× First-team All-MVC (1926, 1927)

Glenn Emery "Press" Presnell (July 28, 1905 – September 13, 2004) was an American football player, coach, and college athletics administrator. He set the NFL single-season scoring record in 1933 and led the league in total offense. He was the last surviving member of the Detroit Lions inaugural 1934 team and helped lead the team to its first NFL championship in 1935. He also set an NFL record with a 54-yard field goal in 1934, a record which was not broken for 19 years. Presnell served as the head football coach at the University of Nebraska–Lincoln in 1942 and at Eastern Kentucky State College—now known as Eastern Kentucky University–from 1954 to 1963, compiling a career college football coaching record of 45–56–3. He was also the athletic director at Eastern Kentucky from 1963 to 1971.

== Early life ==
Born in Gilead, Nebraska, Presnell attended DeWitt High School and the University of Nebraska. He played college football as a halfback for the Nebraska Cornhuskers football team from 1925 to 1927. In 1925, Presnell led Nebraska to a 14–0 victory over an Illini team that included the "Galloping Ghost", Red Grange. As one writer put it, "all the galloping was done by Presnell this day." Presnell was selected as a first-team player on the 1927 College Football All-America Team.

== Professional football ==
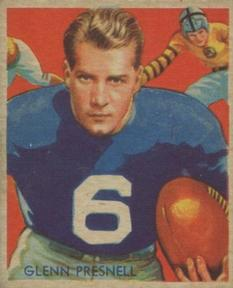

Presnell featured on a 1934 Detroit Lions game program.

After leaving Nebraska, Presnell played football for the Ironton Tanks in Ironton, Ohio. He was a player-coach for the team and also taught science at Ironton High School. Presnell was a halfback in Ironton's single wing offense and also played on defense at what would later be considered the safety position. Although not officially part of the National Football League, the Tanks played against teams in the league. In 1930, Presnell led Ironton to victories over both the New York Giants and the Chicago Bears. Against the Giants, the Tanks trailed 12–6 with three seconds left. Presnell threw a touchdown pass to Gene Alford and then kicked the extra point to give Ironton a 13–12 victory over a Giants team that finished in second place in the NFL. He also scored two touchdowns against the Bears, including an 88-yard run.

After the 1930 season, the Tanks folded. In 1931, Presnell joined the Portsmouth Spartans in the NFL. He had his best season in 1933, when he led the NFL in total offense with 1,296 yards. He also broke the single-season NFL scoring record with 64 points. Ken Strong tied with Presnell with the same point total in 1933. During the 1933 NFL season, Presnell completed 50 of 125 passes for 774 passing yards and added 522 rushing yards on 118 carries for an average of 4.4 yards per carry. He also kicked five field goals and 13 extra points. He led the NFL with six rushing touchdowns and 13 successful extra point conversions. He also finished second in the league (behind Harry Newman) in passing touchdowns, passes completed, pass attempts, and passing yards. Following the 1933 season, Presnell was selected as a first-team All-NFL player by the NFL, the United Press, and Collyers Eye Magazine.

In 1934, the owner of the Portsmouth Spartans sold the team. The team was moved from Portsmouth, Ohio to Detroit, Michigan, and became the Detroit Lions. When Presnell visited Detroit to sign his first contract with the Lions in 1934, team owner George A. Richards allowed Presnell to pick the team's colors. Presnell later recalled: "Mr. Richards, the owner, the day I was up there and signed my contract, he said: 'There's a table out there in the next office covered with uniforms. Why don't you pick out the colors you like?' I went out. My wife was with me. We saw this Honolulu blue and silver and we fell in love with it."

Presnell remained with the Lions from 1934 to 1936. He combined with Dutch Clark, Ace Gutowsky, and Ernie Caddel to lead the Lions to a second-place finish in 1934. And in 1935, the same group led the Lions to their first NFL championship, culminating with a 26–7 victory over the New York Giants in the 1935 NFL Championship Game. Presnell also set an NFL record with a 54-yard field goal in 1934, a mark that was not broken until 1953.

== Coaching and later years ==
Presnell began his coaching career while still paying for the Lions in 1936, when he was hired as head football coach at Lawrence Institute of Technology—now known as Lawrence Technological University—in Highland Park, Michigan. He retired as a player after the 1936 season at age 31. Presnell worked as an assistant football coach at the University of Kansas in 1937 and then as the backfield coach at Nebraska from 1938 to 1941. In February 1942, he became the head football coach at Nebraska. The Cornhuskers compiled a record of 3–7 in Presnell's one season as head coach.

In December 1942, Presnell enlisted in the United States Navy. In May 1943, he was commissioned as a lieutenant and assigned to the Navy's physical education training program. In 1944 Presnell served as backs coach at the North Carolina Pre-Flight School. He spent three years in the Navy.

In 1954, Presnell returned to coaching as the head football coach for Eastern Kentucky University. He held that position from 1954 to 1963. He was then athletic director at Eastern Kentucky until his retirement in 1971.

Presnell died in September 2004 in Ironton, Ohio at the age of 99. He had been the last surviving member of the Detroit Lions' inaugural 1934 team.

== Head coaching record ==
Year	Team	Overall	Conference	Standing	Bowl/playoffs
Lawrence Tech Blue Devils (Michigan-Ontario Collegiate Conference) (1936)
1936	Lawrence Tech	0–5–1			
Lawrence Tech:		0–5–1			
Nebraska Cornhuskers (Big Six Conference) (1942)
1942	Nebraska	3–7	3–2	3rd	
Nebraska:		3–7	3–2		
Eastern Kentucky Maroons (Ohio Valley Conference) (1954–1963)
1954	Eastern Kentucky	8–1–1	5–0	1st	L Tangerine
1955	Eastern Kentucky	5–4–1	3–2	3rd	
1956	Eastern Kentucky	4–5	2–3	T–3rd	
1957	Eastern Kentucky	4–5	3–2	3rd	
1958	Eastern Kentucky	3–6	3–3	4th	
1959	Eastern Kentucky	3-6	2–4	5th	
1960	Eastern Kentucky	3–6–1	1–4–1	T–6th	
1961	Eastern Kentucky	4–5	3–3	4th	
1962	Eastern Kentucky	6–3	4–2	T–1st	
1963	Eastern Kentucky	2–8	1–6	7th	
Eastern Kentucky:		42–49–3	27–29–1		
Total:		45–61–4			
National championship Conference title Conference division title or championship game berth

== Awards ==
- Member of Nebraska Hall of Fame (1973)
- Professional Football Researchers Association Hall of Very Good Class of 2007
- Inducted into Kentucky Pro Football Hall of Fame (2020)
