= J.P. Rooneys =

Defunct semi-pro American football team

General information
- Founded: 1921
- Folded: c.1932
- Stadium: Exposition Park
- Headquartered: Pittsburgh, Pennsylvania, U.S.
- Colors: Green, White, Red (Hope-Harvey)

Personnel
- Owner: Art Rooney
- General manager: Art Rooney
- Head coach: Art Rooney

Nickname
- Irish

Team history
- Hope-Harvey (1921–c.1923); Majestic Radios (c.1923–1930); J.P. Rooneys (1931–1932)

League / conference affiliations
- Independent (W.Pa. Senior; Independent Football Conference)

The J.P. Rooneys (or formally the James P. Rooneys) were an independent semi-professional American football team, based in Pittsburgh, Pennsylvania. The team was founded by Art Rooney, who is best known for being the founder of the Pittsburgh Steelers of the National Football League, and this team is considered to be the beginnings of the modern-day Steelers. The team played at Exposition Park and reportedly had up to 12,000 people in the stands at times.

== History ==
The team was founded in 1921 as Hope-Harvey. The team's name was based on two items. The first was a fire station, located in the city's Hope ward, where the team would dress and shower for home games. The second item was based on Dr. Walter Harvey, the physician who tended to injured players. According to Art Rooney, Dr. Walter Harvey never charged the team or players for his services. The team's uniforms were handmade by the players or members of their families so each one was sewn differently.

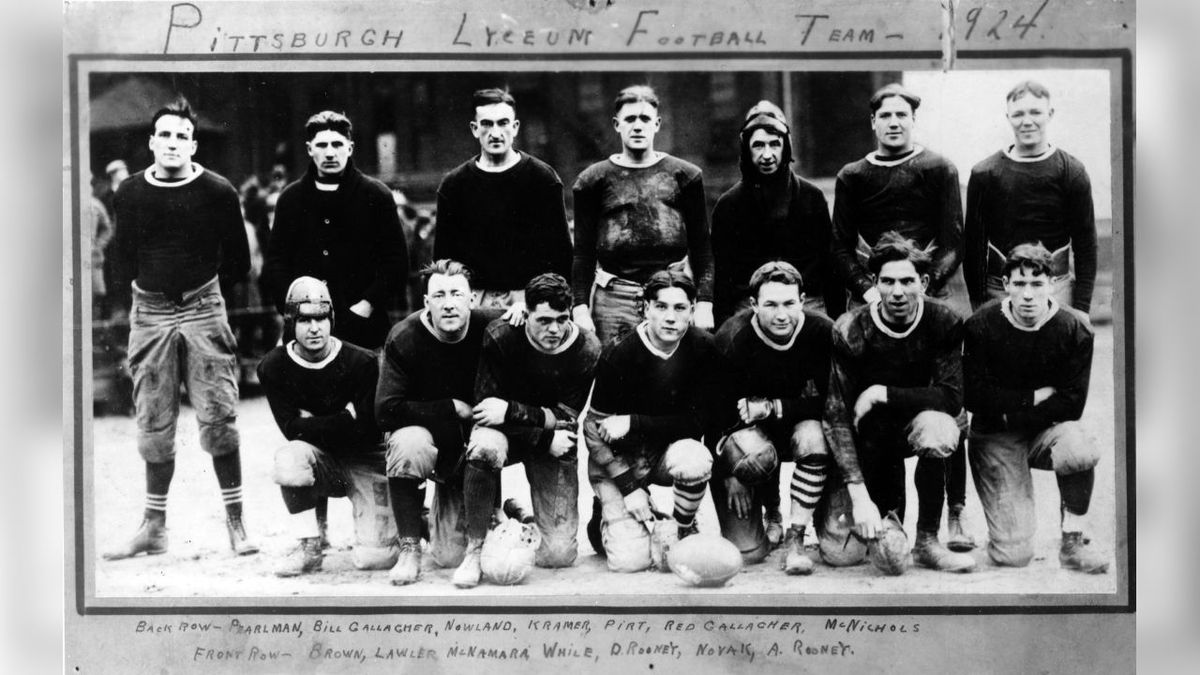
J.P. Rooney football team in 1924

Rooney not only served the team as a player-coach, but also recruited players from the neighborhoods and local colleges. His brothers, Dan Rooney Jr. (uncle of longtime Steelers chairman Daniel M. Rooney) and James P. Rooney, played on the team in its early years, the only time the three were players together on the same football team. After a few years of play, the team was sponsored by "Loeffler's Electronic Store", who renamed the team after one of its best selling products, the Majestic Radio. Hence the team became known as the Majestic Radios. The team's affiliation with Loeffler's ended prior to the team's 1931 season. When James decided to run for the Pennsylvania General Assembly, Art renamed the team the "J.P. Rooneys" as a way to promote his brother's campaign. James Rooney would go on to win the election easily. Rooney's semi-professional teams met a fair amount of success, including at least two Western Pennsylvania Senior Independent Football Conference titles in the early 1930s.

In 1933, as Pennsylvania's blue laws were about to be repealed, Rooney applied for and received a franchise in the National Football League. The Rooneys morphed into the Pittsburgh Pirates, and were renamed the Steelers in 1940.

== Legacy ==
The team marked the very beginning of Art J. Rooney's longstanding career in professional football. Art Rooney also became one of the biggest stars in the Pittsburgh sandlot football circuit as the team's quarterback. Finally, this period stands as the only time when Art Rooney managed, coached and played on a team. Several of the Rooneys players would go on to play for the Pittsburgh Pirates of the NFL in 1933, such as Mose Kelsch and Ray Kemp. In 2003 a sculpture of the Hope-Harvey team, consisting of 23 signed and numbered figures, each cold cast in nickel resin, were created by Kathy Rooney, the youngest daughter of the team's ball boy, Vince Rooney, and her husband, Ray Sokolowski. The couple made an original sculpture and 30 copies, which sold from $20,000 to $25,000 a piece.
