= Wooster School =

Prep school in Danbury, Connecticut, US

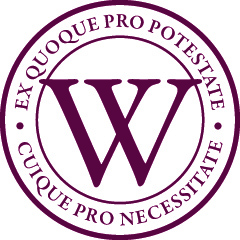

Location
- 91 Miry Brook Road; Danbury, Connecticut 06810; United States; 41°21′59″N 73°29′58″W

Information
- Type: Private, coeducation
- Religious affiliation: Episcopal
- Established: 1926 (100 years ago)
- Founder: Aaron C. Coburn
- CEEB code: 070130
- Head of school: Matt Byrnes
- Faculty: 61
- Enrollment: 336 (as of 2021)
- Student to teacher ratio: 5:1
- Campus size: 125 acres (51 ha)
- Campus type: Suburban
- Colors: White, Maroon, Black
- Athletics: Interscholastic sports teams Housatonic Valley Athletic League
- Mascot: The General
- Team name: Generals
- Tuition: $47,440 (2024)
- Website: www.woosterschool.org

Wooster School is a private, co-educational, college-preparatory school (grades 5 through 12) in Danbury, Connecticut. It is a member of the Connecticut Association of Independent Schools.

== Overview ==
The Wooster School motto is Ex Quoque Potestate, Cuique Pro Necessitate, roughly, "From each according to ability, to each according to need". Founded in 1926 as a boys' school of 10 students by Episcopal priest Dr. Aaron Coburn, it is named for General David Wooster, who fought at the Battle of Ridgefield with the Patriots in the American Revolution. The school continues the legacy of the jobs program, in which the entire student body engages in a daily period dedicated to cleaning and physically maintaining the campus.

Girls were first admitted to the school in the fall of 1970. In 1990, Wooster School transitioned from being a boarding school, as it had been since its inception, to being a day school.

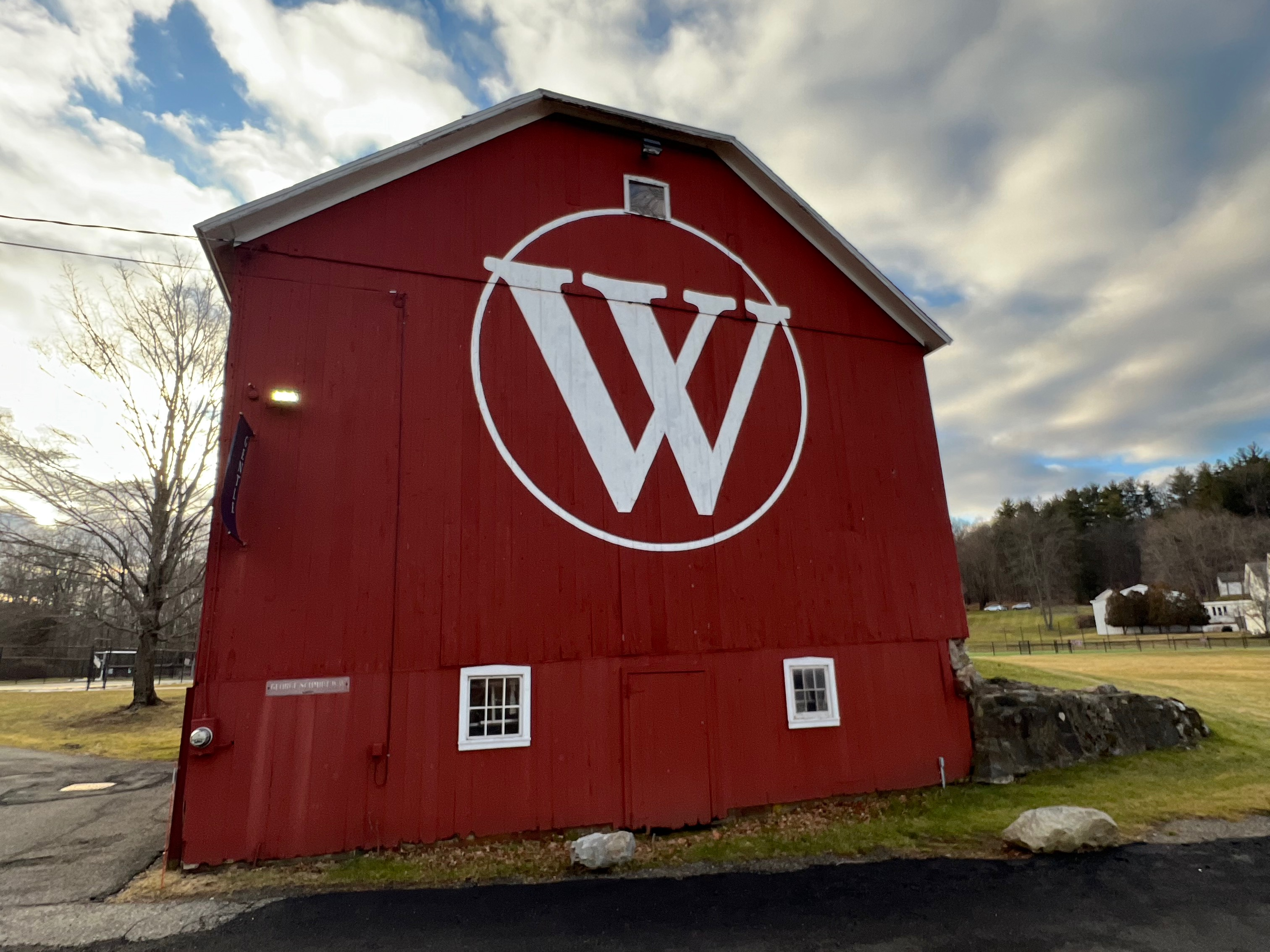
The Wooster School Barn at the campus entrance

=== 21st-century changes ===
Since 2000, one of the National Association of Episcopal Schools' top two educator awards is named for former Wooster School head John D. Verdery.

From 2001 to 2004, Wooster School made some improvements to its physical plant, notably the addition of a new gymnasium and a distinct Middle School building.

== Tuition ==
Wooster offers a program of variable tuition to families unable to pay full tuition. Full tuition for the 2023-2024 academic year was as follows:

Grade 5	$33,210
Grade 6	$37,160
Grade 7	$38,670
Grade 8	$40,260
Grades 9 - 12	$43,920
The Pathways Program	$51,920
The Bridge Program	$62,130

== Notable alumni ==
- Tracy Chapman—folk singer and guitarist
- Andrew Stevovich—painter
- Cyrus Mehri—trial attorney
- Zachary Cole Smith—singer
- Neil Rudenstine—president of Harvard University
