= Ray Kemp =

American football player (1907–2002)

No. 45
- Position: Tackle

Personal information
- Born: April 7, 1907; Cecil, Pennsylvania, U.S.
- Died: March 26, 2002 (aged 94); Ashtabula, Ohio, U.S.
- Listed height: 6 ft 1 in (1.85 m)
- Listed weight: 215 lb (98 kg)

Career information
- High school: Cecil
- College: Duquesne

Career history

Playing
- J.P. Rooneys (1932); Erie Pros (1932); Pittsburgh Pirates (1933)

Coaching
- Duquesne (1932) Assistant coach; Bluefield (1934) Head coach; Lincoln (MO) (1935–1941) Head coach; Lincoln (MO) (1944) Head coach

Career statistics
- Games: 5

Raymond Howard Kemp (April 7, 1907 – March 26, 2002) was an American football player and a charter member of the Pittsburgh Pirates football team (now called the Pittsburgh Steelers). He was also the first African-American player in the team's history. In 1933, he was the only African-American on the team and only one of two black players in the entire National Football League (NFL).

== Early life ==
Kemp graduated from Cecil High School in 1926. After graduation, he worked in the coal mines around Cecil, Pennsylvania for one year before enrolling at Duquesne University.

== Duquesne Dukes ==
At Duquesne, Kemp was coached by Elmer Layden, a former member of Notre Dame's Four Horsemen (and later the commissioner of the NFL). Kemp became a starter for the Dukes during his sophomore year and by the end of his senior season, he received an honorable mention on some All-American lists. He also competed on the school's track and field team. After graduation, Future Pirates owner, Art Rooney told Kemp that he would like for him to play for his "J.P. Rooney semi-pro team". In 1932 he did play for both the J.P. Rooneys and the semi-pro Erie Pros in his spare time. He remained at Duquesne that season, and served as the line coach under Layden.

== Pittsburgh Pirates ==
The following year, the J.P. Rooneys were reorganized and became the NFL's Pittsburgh Pirates. Kemp joined the team and became one of only two black players in the league, the other being Joe Lillard of the Chicago Cardinals. Kemp played in the Pirates' first three games against, the New York Giants, Chicago Cardinals and Boston Redskins. After the Redskins game, Kemp was cut by the team. He appealed the cut to Art Rooney, but Rooney refused to go over the head of the coach, Jap Douds, who as a player-coach, also played Kemp's position. However a Pittsburgh Courier story on November 14, 1933 claimed that Kemp was placed on the reserve list and quit, although fans had rated him highly. Art Rooney stated that he was limited to having only 22 players on the roster and preferred to keep the more experienced players.

Kemp then went back to his job in the steel mill and the Pirates went 2–5 over the next seven games. He was named to the starting lineup after only two days of practice and played the entire game at tackle against the New York Giants, who would defeat the Pirates 27-3 at the Polo Grounds. However, the Friday before the Pirates' game in New York, Kemp was asked to leave the hotel housing the Pirates' players. Walter Francis White of the National Association for the Advancement of Colored People, suggested he file a discrimination suit. However Kemp refused, fearing the backlash that would occur to Art Rooney, who had given him a chance at an NFL career. That game against the Giants was the final game of Kemp's brief career in the NFL. The next season, he was hired as the head football coach at Bluefield State College.

With the exits of Kemp and Lillard, the NFL would not have any black players until 1946.

== Later life ==
One of the highlights of Ray Kemp's post-football career came when he stood on the Steelers' sideline before a game at Three Rivers Stadium in 1982. The Steelers were celebrating their 50th anniversary and Kemp was a member of their first team in 1933. Kemp was the last surviving member of the Pirates/Steelers inaugural roster of 1933, having outlived teammate John Letsinger by slightly less than two months.

== Head coaching record ==
Year	Team	Overall	Conference	Standing	Bowl/playoffs
Bluefield State Big Blues (Colored Intercollegiate Athletic Association) (1934)
1934	Bluefield State	8–0–1	7–0–1	2nd	
Bluefield State:		8–0–1	7–0–1		
Lincoln Blue Tigers (Midwest Athletic Association) (1935–1941)
1935	Lincoln	5–1–2			
1936	Lincoln	1–6–1	0–2–1	4th	
1937	Lincoln	2–2–2	2–1–2	T–2nd	
1938	Lincoln	3–3–1	2–3	5th	
1939	Lincoln	4–3	2–2	T–3rd	
1940	Lincoln	4–2			
1941	Lincoln	3–4	1–2	4th	
Lincoln Blue Tigers (Midwest Athletic Association) (1944)
1944	Lincoln	0–4			
Lincoln:		22–25–6			
Total:		30–25–7			
