= Holahan =

Holahan is a surname. Notable people with the surname include:

- Dennis Holahan (born 1942), American attorney and actor
- John Holahan (1904–1975), American sports executive
- Paul Holahan, American film, television director, cinematographer, producer, and photographer
