= Francis Fogarty (American football) =

American football executive (1918–1969)

- Fogarty in 1963

Personal information
- Born: November 18, 1918; Pittsburgh, Pennsylvania, U.S.
- Died: August 17, 1969 (aged 50); Pittsburgh, Pennsylvania, U.S.

Career information
- High school: Central Catholic (Pittsburgh, Pennsylvania)
- College: Duquesne

Career history
- Pittsburgh Steelers (1946–1968) Auditor (1946–1950) Assistant treasurer / general manager (1951–1952) General manager (1953–1968)
- Executive profile at Pro Football Reference

Francis G. Fogarty (November 18, 1918 – August 17, 1969) was an American football executive who served as the general manager of the Pittsburgh Steelers from 1951 until his death prior to the 1969 season.

== Early life ==
Fogarty was born on November 18, 1918, in Pittsburgh, Pennsylvania. He was the son of John Fogarty, the long-time head groundskeeper for Forbes Field, and had six siblings. He graduated from Central Catholic High School in Pittsburgh and later attended Duquesne University. While at Duquesne, he played for the Duquesne Dukes ice hockey team. He later played hockey for a team in Wilkinsburg in the late 1940s.

Fogarty served in World War II as a lieutenant. He took part in the Normandy landings on D-Day but was wounded in the leg and captured as a prisoner by the Nazis. While being transported to a prisoner of war camp, Fogarty was able to escape and fought with the Free France resistance group before returning to his unit.

== Executive career ==
Fogarty began his affiliation with the Pittsburgh Steelers of the National Football League (NFL) in 1946 after the war. He began as an auditor and bookkeeper with the team and also worked for the boxing club owned by Steelers founder Art Rooney and his friend. By early 1951, he had been promoted to assistant treasurer. The Steelers general manager John Holahan resigned in June 1951 and Fogarty, aged 32, became one of his replacements; initially manager tasks were divided between him, Ed Kiely (publicity director) and Joe Carr (ticket manager), with Ray Byrne also assisting in training camp. Fogarty was in charge of player affairs and contracts. The Steelers compiled a record of 4–7–1 in Fogarty's first year in the position.

By 1953, Fogarty had become the official general manager of the team. He ultimately served 18 years as the general manager of the Steelers and became known as "Art Rooney's right hand man" – the Pittsburgh Post-Gazette noted that "he knew more about the inner workings of the local football team than anyone around." Under his leadership, the Steelers had an overall record of 93–129–10, which included six seasons at .500 or better, and a best mark of 9–5 in 1962 for a second-place finish in their division.

Outside of the Steelers, Fogarty also was known for his efforts to promote handball and hockey in the area; he served as the head coach of the Pittsburgh Knights, an all-star team in the Pittsburgh Metropolitan Hockey Association.

== Personal life and death ==
Fogarty was married and had three children. He was a member of the American Legion, Loyal Order of Moose, North Side Elks and Pittsburgh Athletic Association.

On August 16, 1969, Fogarty attended the wedding ceremony of his daughter and went home after midnight complaining of chest pains. He suffered a heart attack shortly after and died at the Pittsburgh Hospital early on August 17, aged 50. Al Abrams of the Pittsburgh Post-Gazette commented that "all of us lost a good friend and a fine gentleman ... Of all the people I have met in sports locally, there wasn't a nicer man than Fran Fogarty. Never did I hear him say an unkind word about anybody. His friendly grin and greetings will be missed as much as his ability to handle the bookkeeping duties."
