= Cyrus Mehri =

American civil rights attorney

- Born: July 14, 1961 (age 65)
- Education: Hartwick College; Cornell Law School
- Occupation: Lawyer
- Employer: Mehri & Skalet

Cyrus Mehri (born July 14, 1961) is an American attorney and partner at Mehri & Skalet. He is best known for helping to establish the National Football League’s (NFL) Rooney Rule.

== Professional history ==
In 2001, together with Steven Skalet, Mehri founded Mehri & Skalet, a law firm that specializes in discrimination, civil and consumer-rights violations, and corporate fraud.

Mehri’s most notable cases are as follows, many of which resulted in the creation of an outside task force or monitor:

- Roberts v. Texaco (1997) (covered in the book, Roberts vs. Texaco: A True Story of Race and Corporate America, by Bari-Ellen Roberts)
- Ingram v. The Coca-Cola Company (2001) (covered in the book, The Real Thing: Truth and Power at the Coca-Cola Company, by Constance L. Hays)
- Robinson v. Ford (2005)
- August-Johnson v. Morgan Stanley (2007)
- Amachoev v. Smith Barney (2008)
- Norflet v. John Hancock Life Insurance (2009)
- Carter v. Wells Fargo Advisors (2011)
- Brown v. Medicis Pharmaceutical (2013)
- Pars Equality Center et al v. Trump et al (2017)

== The Rooney Rule ==
In 2002, Mehri cowrote, with Johnnie L. Cochran Jr., a report titled Black Coaches in the National Football League: Superior Performance, Inferior Opportunities. In response, the NFL adopted the Rooney Rule. Named after Pittsburgh Steelers’ owner Dan Rooney, the rule requires that at least one minority candidate be interviewed for the positions of head coach or general manager. Mehri’s work with the NFL formed the basis of the book, Advancing the Ball: Race, Reformation, and the Quest for Equal Coaching Opportunity in the NFL, by N. Jeremi Duru.

In 2015, the English Football League adapted the Rooney Rule for professional soccer in the United Kingdom.

Other entities that have implemented versions of the rule include the cities of Portland and Pittsburgh, and the companies Xerox, Intel, Facebook, Pinterest, and Amazon.

== The Fritz Pollard Alliance ==
In 2003, Mehri cofounded the Fritz Pollard Alliance, a non-profit organisation dedicated to diversity in the NFL. This affinity group helps minorities secure off-the-field leadership positions in the league, and at various points was led by former NFL players including John Wooten, Harry Carson, and Kellen Winslow. Rob Graves, former General Manager of the Arizona Cardinals, is the current executive director.

== Women on Wall Street ==
In 2004, together with the National Council of Women’s Organizations, Mehri launched the Women on Wall Street project. The project seeks to end discrimination against women in financial institutions, and has reached settlements with Morgan Stanley, Smith Barney, and Wachovia, among others.

== Working IDEAL ==
In 2017, Mehri cofounded Working IDEAL with Pamela Coukos to advise on inclusive workplaces, diverse talent and fair pay to large and small companies, universities, non-profits, unions and other organizations across the nation.

== Publications ==
Mehri’s writings and thoughts on politics and workplace diversity are published in an array of national outlets. His writing on U.S. politics has been featured in The Atlantic and Politico Magazine. These pieces discussed President Donald Trump’s legal issues, civil rights law, and the 2020 U.S. Presidential Election. Mehri has also written about workplace diversity and his efforts relating to the Rooney Rule.

Additionally, Mehri’s work has informed reports in several recent books, including Carl Ware’s Portrait of an American Businessman: One Generation from Cotton Field to Boardroom, Jim Rooney’s A Different Way to Win: Dan Rooney's Story from the Super Bowl to the Rooney Rule, and Diversity, Inc.: The Failed Promise of a Billion-Dollar Business by Pamela Newkirk.

== Education ==
Mehri graduated from Hartwick College in 1983 and Cornell Law School in 1988.

== Awards ==
For his advocacy, in 2014, Mr. Mehri was given the Cornell Law School Public Service Award. Hartwick College chose Mr. Mehri as its 2009 Commencement Speaker and inaugural alumni hall of fame. The Detroit City Council passed a testimonial resolution honoring Mr. Mehri and wishing him “continued success in changing the fabric of America”; the Pigskin Club of Washington, D.C. awarded Cyrus Mehri its Award of Excellence; and the City of Miami gave him the Distinguished Visitor Award. In 2019, Mr. Mehri accepted the Diversity and Trailblazing Award at the D&I Honors hosted by Diverse & Engaged. Most recently, Hartwick College selected Mr. Mehri for an Honorary Degree, Doctor of Laws ’21.
