= Rooney Rule =

U.S. National Football League policy

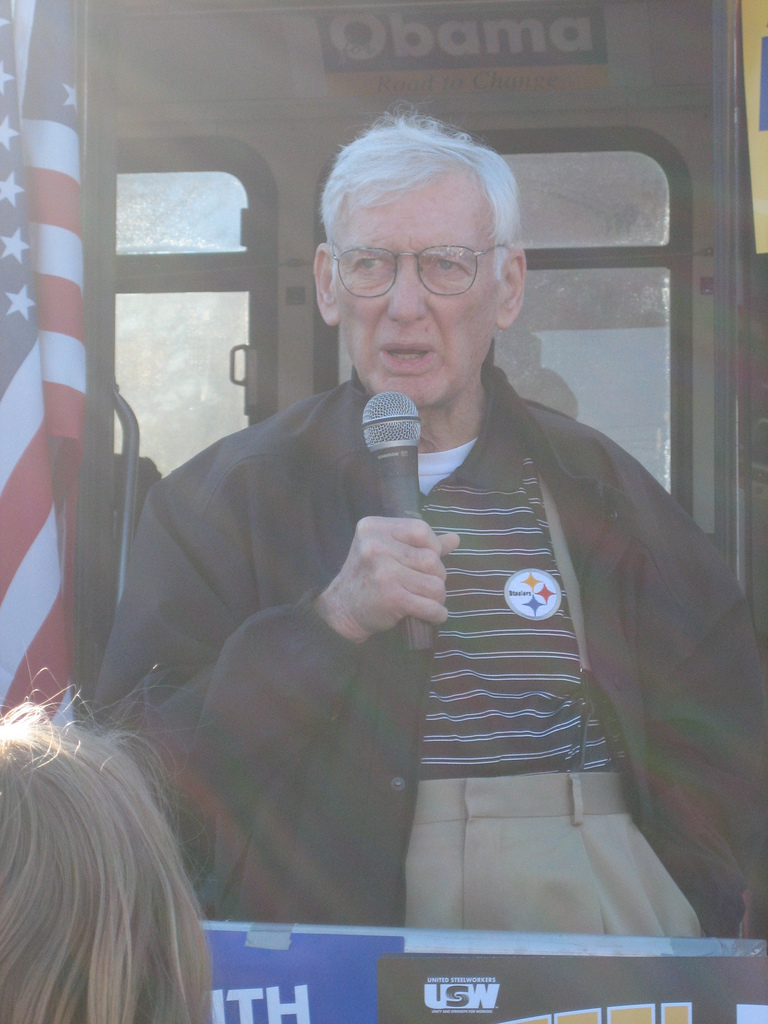
Dan Rooney, the policy's namesake

The Rooney Rule is a National Football League policy that requires teams to interview ethnic-minority candidates for head coaching and senior football operation jobs. Initially, the program mandated interviews with underrepresented minority groups, aligning with modern diversity, equity, and inclusion principles. However, since 2022, the program has shifted toward affirmative action, incorporating hiring quotas that prioritize minority candidates. The first actual hiring quota was established before the 2022 season, mandating that at least one member of each team's offensive coaching staff must be either an ethnic minority or a woman. The Rooney Rule was established in 2003, and variations of the rule are now in place in other industries.

== History ==
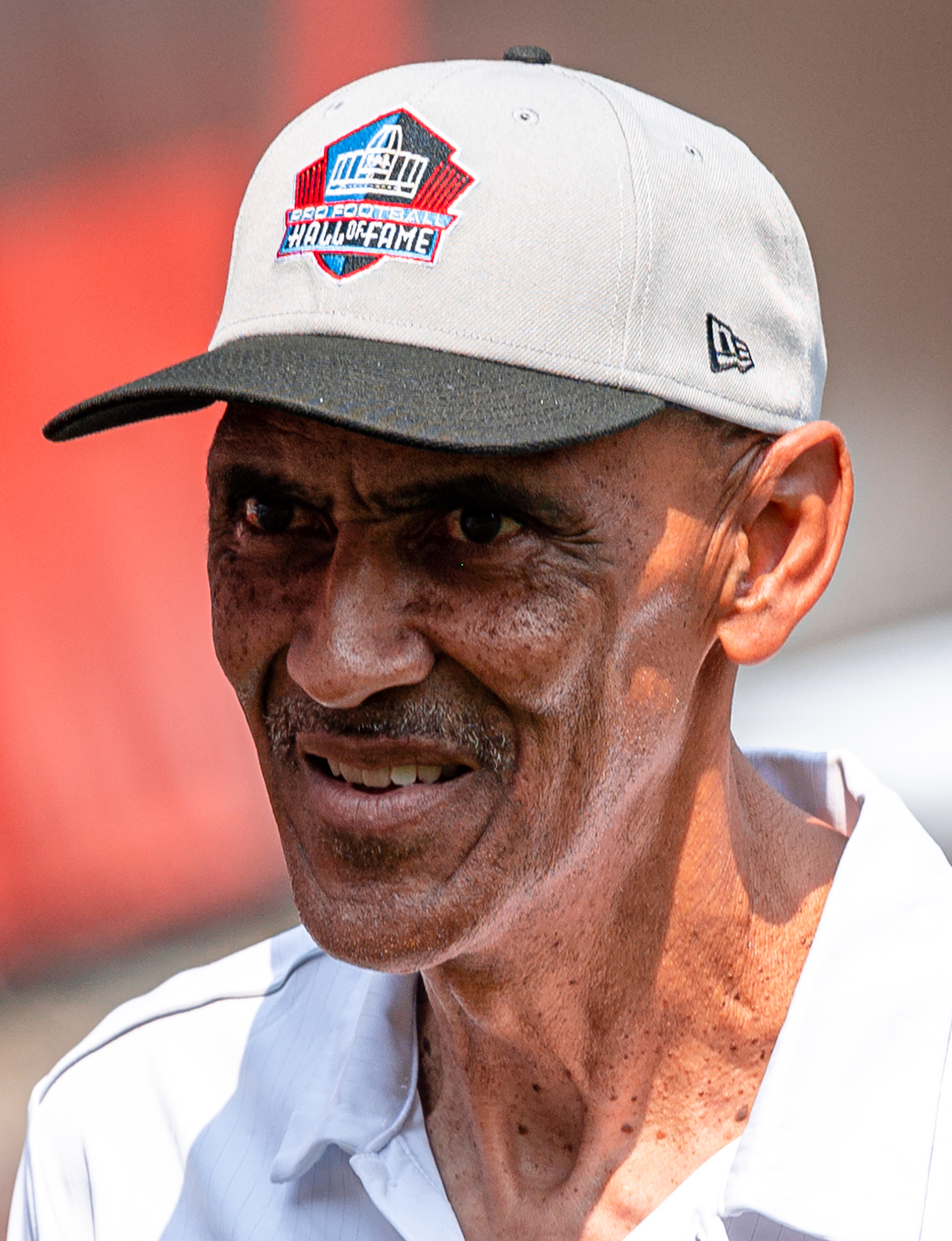
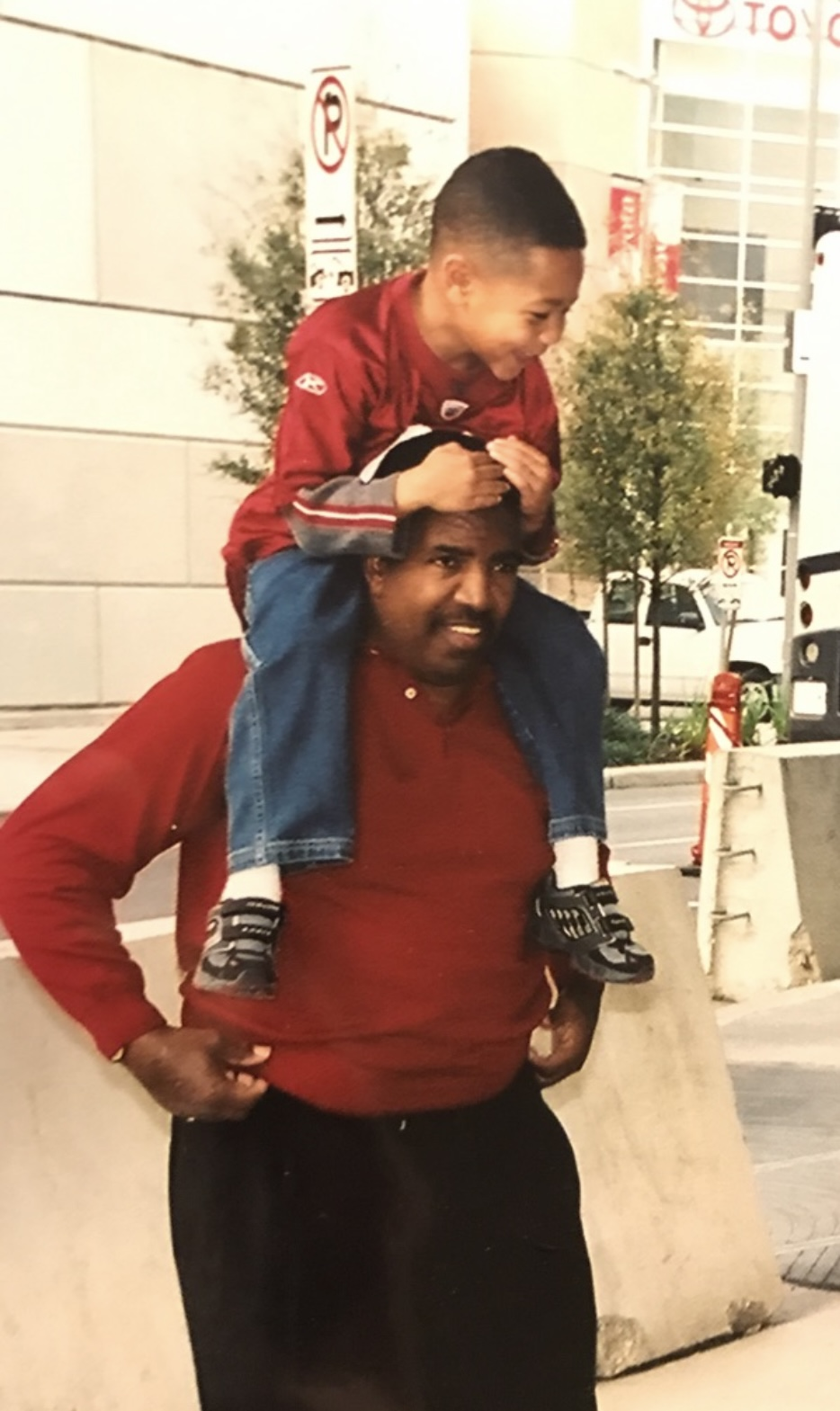
The 2002 firings of head coaches Tony Dungy (left) of the Tampa Bay Buccaneers and Dennis Green of the Minnesota Vikings, led to the implementation of the Rooney Rule in the NFL

The rule is named after Dan Rooney, the former owner of the Pittsburgh Steelers and former chairman of the league's diversity committee.

It was created as a reaction to the 2002 firings of head coaches Tony Dungy of the Tampa Bay Buccaneers and Dennis Green of the Minnesota Vikings, at a time when Dungy had a winning record and Green had just had his first losing season in ten years. Shortly afterwards, U.S. civil rights attorneys Cyrus Mehri and Johnnie Cochran released a study showing that black head coaches, despite winning a higher percentage of games, were less likely to be hired and more likely to be fired than their white counterparts. Former NFL players Kellen Winslow and John Wooten then put together an affinity group of minority scouts, coaches, and front-office personnel, to advocate for the rule's creation. This rule was also heavily supported by NFL players, most of whom are African American.

Its purpose was to ensure that minority coaches, especially African Americans, would be considered for high-level coaching positions. Fritz Pollard was the first minority head coach in NFL history (which was during the league's early years in the 1920s) and by the time the rule was implemented, only Tom Flores, Art Shell, Dennis Green, Ray Rhodes, Tony Dungy, and Herman Edwards had ever held head coaching jobs. (Only Dungy and Edwards were actively head coaching at the time of the rule's implementation, though Shell and Green would later return to head coaching.) Dungy in particular had struggled for years before getting a head coaching job; he was often promoted as a head coaching candidate by Chuck Noll when Dungy was an assistant under Noll in the 1980s with the Steelers, but he would not become a head coach until 1996 when he took over the Tampa Bay Buccaneers. Another former Steelers assistant, Marvin Lewis, also struggled to find a head coaching position despite immense success as the Baltimore Ravens defensive coordinator and would not find a head coaching position until being hired by the Cincinnati Bengals in 2003, the year the Rooney Rule went into effect.

== Application ==
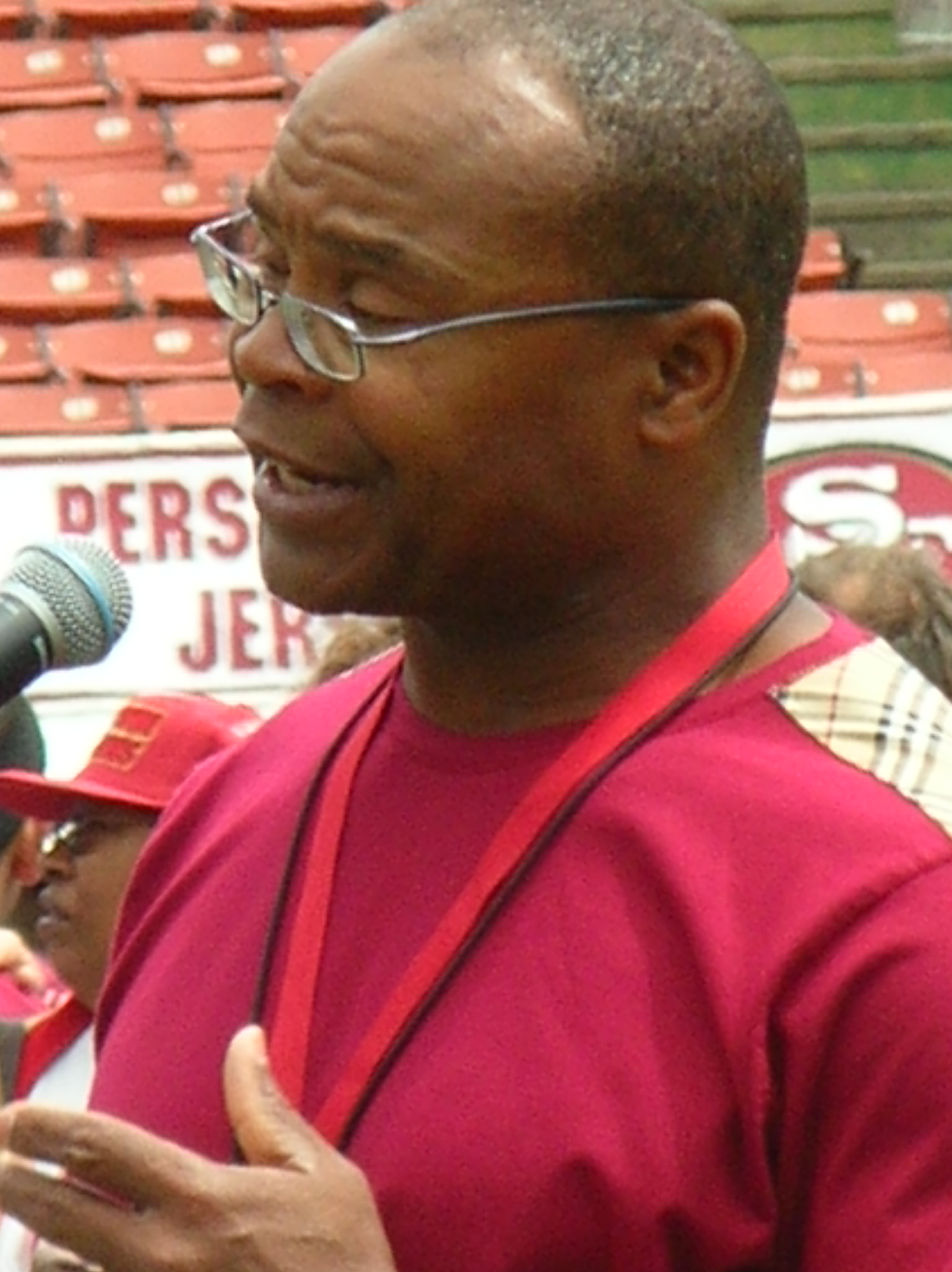
Mike Singletary with the San Francisco 49ers

The rule does not apply if an assistant coach has language in his contract guaranteeing him the head coaching job in case of an opening. For example, this was the case when Mike Martz took over as head coach of the St. Louis Rams before the 2000 season. Also, the requirement does not apply if the assistant coach taking over the head position belongs to a minority group, as was the case with Mike Singletary and the San Francisco 49ers in late 2008.

As of June 15, 2009, Rooney Rule requirements applied to all searches for senior football operations positions within the NFL, regardless of a team's title for that position. It now also includes all ethnic minorities, not just African Americans.

Some legal scholars have advocated for extending the Rooney Rule to college football, where the number of minority head coaches was around 6% in 2008, or only about half the African American share of the U.S. population.

== Impact ==
Since the Rooney Rule was established, several NFL franchises have hired African American head coaches, including the Steelers themselves, who hired Mike Tomlin before their 2007 season. (The Steelers, however, had already interviewed Ron Rivera, who is ethnically Hispanic, to fulfill the requirement before interviewing Tomlin, and Rooney himself contends that Tomlin's hiring did not result from the Rule.) At the start of the 2006 season, the overall percentage of African American coaches had jumped to 22%, up from 6% prior to the Rooney Rule.

As of December 31, 2018, two of the 32 head coaches in the NFL were African American, with one Hispanic head coach. As of 2020, the NFL had three African American head coaches, the same number as in 2003 when the Rooney Rule was adopted.

Entering the 2026 season, the number of minority head coaches by NFL definition is five. Todd Bowles (Tampa Bay), Aaron Glenn (New York Jets), and DeMeco Ryans (Houston) are African American; Dave Canales (Carolina) is Hispanic; Robert Saleh (Tennessee) is a Muslim of Lebanese origin.

=== 2022 changes ===
In 1952, six years after the NFL officially desegregated again, Art Rooney's Pittsburgh Steelers had only one black player on the roster, fullback Jack Spinks (#37).

On March 28, 2022, the NFL announced that it had made further changes to the Rooney Rule. First, starting with the 2022 season, all teams are required to have at least one minority on their offensive coaching staff. Minority group members already serving in such roles count toward compliance with this new provision, intended to increase the number of minorities in the pool of offensive coaches, which had produced the most sought-after candidates for head coaching positions in recent years. Coaches hired under this provision will be paid at least in part from a league-wide fund set aside for this purpose.

For the first time, the definition of "minority" for purposes of the Rooney Rule was fully extended to include women, regardless of their racial or ethnic background. While teams are not required to interview women for coaching positions, women will count toward all required interviewing quotas.

== 2020 Resolution JC-2A ==
In November 2020, the NFL passed 2020 Resolution JC-2A, which rewards teams for developing minority candidates for head coach and/or GM positions. The resolution rewards teams whose minority candidates are hired away for one of those positions by awarding third-round draft picks, similar to the system for compensatory draft picks. For example, the first team to receive such picks, the Los Angeles Rams, received third-round picks in 2021 and 2022 after the Detroit Lions hired their director of college scouting Brad Holmes as their general manager.

An earlier version of the resolution would have rewarded teams for hiring minority candidates rather than for developing them.

JC-2A stipulates an executive hiring must be as the "primary football executive", which does not always refer to the general manager, in order for the losing team to receive compensatory picks. This caveat led to controversy in 2026 when the Atlanta Falcons hired Ian Cunningham from the Chicago Bears as general manager, but the Bears did not get the picks because president of football Matt Ryan was Atlanta's primary football executive. Ryan stressed Cunningham would oversee building the roster while Cunningham advocated for his former team to receive the picks. Although the Bears appealed to the league on the matter, the NFL ruled against them because JC-2A "provide[d] picks for the Primary Football Executive position. The League determined Mr. Cunningham did not fill that role with the Falcons as it is defined in League rules."

== Controversies ==
=== Detroit Lions case, 2003 ===
In 2003, the NFL fined the Detroit Lions $200,000 for failure to interview African American candidates for the team's vacant head coaching job. After Marty Mornhinweg was fired, the Lions immediately hired former San Francisco 49ers head coach Steve Mariucci to replace him without interviewing any other candidates. The Lions claimed they had attempted to interview other candidates but that the African American candidates withdrew from interviews, believing Mariucci's hiring was inevitable. The Lions did not hire another minority head coach until hiring Jim Caldwell in 2014. Previously, minority Wayne Fontes was head coach of the team.

=== 2012 controversial non-hirings and possible rule revision ===
In the wake of no minority hirings to fill eight head coaching and seven general management vacancies following the conclusion of the 2012 NFL regular season, NFL Executive Vice president of Human Resources Robert Gulliver stated, "While there has been full compliance with the interview requirements of the Rooney Rule and we wish the new head coaches and general managers much success, the hiring results this year have been unexpected and reflect a disappointing lack of diversity." Analysts have pointed to the lack of interview offers for Baltimore Ravens' Offensive coordinator Jim Caldwell, who, as head coach, led the Indianapolis Colts to a 14–2 2009 season along with winning the 2009 American Football Conference title before losing in Super Bowl XLIV, as evidence that the rule needs revision. Some sports analysts have called upon the NFL to modify the Rooney Rule by requiring NFL teams to interview a minority candidate outside their respective organizations, and extending the rule to include interviews for offensive and defensive coordinators.

=== 2020 controversy ===
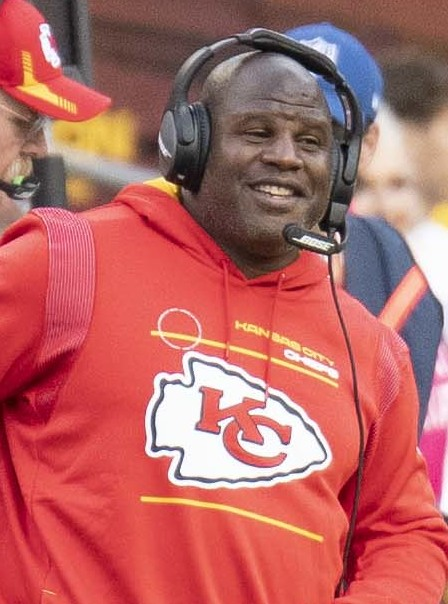
Bieniemy in 2021

In recent years, the trend of hiring head coaches in the NFL has shifted towards looking for successful offensive coordinators, a role in which minorities only hold two out of the 32 available positions. In 2020, five NFL teams had head coaching vacancies to fill, and only one of them hired a non-White coach. These five teams were criticized for passing on Eric Bieniemy, the offensive coordinator for the Super Bowl champion Kansas City Chiefs. Under Bieniemy, the Kansas City Chiefs had the league's top-ranked offense in the 2018 season, and the 5th ranked offense in 2019.

The 2020 NFL offseason led to many figures questioning the effectiveness of this rule due to Bieniemy not receiving serious consideration for a head coaching position and other such controversies since the rule's inception. To fulfill the requirements of this rule, many teams interview non-White coaches that have been around the league for years and have had previously unsuccessful stints as head coaches, such as Marvin Lewis. Critics of the rule argue that the rule has been largely ineffective, and in some situations, it has even had the opposite effect, with non-White coaches being interviewed without being given serious consideration just to fulfill the requirement.

In May 2020 the NFL increased the requirements of the Rooney rule to require two external minority candidate interviews, rather than one, for head coaching jobs. In addition, teams must now interview at least one minority candidate for all coordinator positions. Also, teams and the NFL league office must also interview at least one minority candidate for senior-level positions, including general manager and club president jobs. Finally, for at least some positions, women may be interviewed to satisfy the requirement.

=== 2022 Brian Flores lawsuit ===
On February 1, 2022, former Miami Dolphins head coach Brian Flores sued the NFL, the Dolphins, the New York Giants, and the Denver Broncos, alleging racism, violations of federal employment law, and that his interviews were a sham meant solely to fulfill the Rooney Rule.

=== 2026 legal challenge ===
On March 27, 2026, Florida attorney general James Uthmeier sent a letter to the NFL demanding that the league no longer enforce the Rooney Rule or face a possible civil rights lawsuit. Uthmeier claimed the rule creates "blatant race and sex discrimination" that "brazenly violates Florida state law". On March 31, at a press conference during the annual league meetings, commissioner Roger Goodell defended the rule, stating that "diversity has been a benefit to the National Football League" and that the league had no intention to stop enforcing the rule.

== Outside the NFL ==
In soccer, players' representatives have been campaigning for a similar practice in England. Gordon Taylor, Chief Executive of the PFA (the players' trade union) said in September 2014 the sport "has a 'hidden resistance' preventing black managers getting jobs," pointing out that "you see so many black players on the pitch, yet we have two black managers out of 92." Garth Crooks, a prominent black former player, was especially scathing of the failure of The Football League (a large association of clubs below the top-tier Premier League) to pursue the matter, suggesting the league lacked courage. Black coaches Kieron Dyer and Titus Bramble spoke out against the idea of Rooney Rule, saying they did not want to be perceived as having their roles because of a "quota". On January 9, 2018, it was reported that the England national football team would implement the Rooney Rule for all future interviews for the manager position.

On August 2, 2020, the West Coast Conference (WCC), an NCAA Division I league, announced that it had adopted a similar policy effective immediately, calling its initiative the Russell Rule after Basketball Hall of Famer Bill Russell, who played in college at charter and current WCC member San Francisco. The WCC became the first Division I conference to establish such a policy. According to the WCC,

The “Russell Rule” requires each member institution to include a member of a traditionally underrepresented community in the pool of final candidates for every athletic director, senior administrator, head coach and full-time assistant coach position in the athletic department.

== Outside sports ==
Some companies outside of sports, such as U.S. Bank, Pinterest, Facebook, Patreon and Checkr, have put similar rules in place for their hiring processes. In general, the Rooney rule in these companies focuses on the diversity of the applicants in the pipeline for a particular position; the rule requires pausing at some stage of the hiring process until some diversity benchmark has been reached for the pool of applicants at that stage.
