= Joe Lillard =

American football player (1905–1978)

No. 19
- Position: Halfback

Personal information
- Born: June 15, 1905; Tulsa, Indian Territory
- Died: September 18, 1978 (aged 73); New York City, U.S.

Career information
- High school: Mason City (IA)
- College: Oregon

Career history
- Chicago Cardinals (1932–1933)

Career statistics
- Rushing yards: 494
- Rushing average: 2.9
- Rushing touchdowns: 1
- Stats at Pro Football Reference

Joseph Johnny Lillard Jr. (June 15, 1905 – September 18, 1978) was an American football, baseball, and basketball player. From 1932 to 1933, he was a running back for the National Football League's (NFL) Chicago Cardinals. Lillard was the last African-American, along with Ray Kemp, to play in the NFL until 1946, when Kenny Washington and Woody Strode joined the Los Angeles Rams. Lillard received the nickname "The Midnight Express" by the media. In 1933, he was responsible for almost half of the Cardinals' points.

An orphan from an early age, Lillard attended Mason City High School before moving to the University of Oregon. He played twice for the university's football team in 1931 before he was ruled ineligible by the Pacific Coast Conference (PCC) for playing semi-professional baseball. The following year, he signed with the Cardinals, but played less frequently toward the end of the season. Lillard was a leading contributor for the Cardinals in 1933, receiving praise from the Chicago Defender. His performances during the season included a game against the Chicago Bears that featured a punt return for a touchdown. However, he was ejected from two games that season for fighting, into which he was often baited by white opponents.

With the advent of an unofficial color line that excluded black players, Lillard did not play in the NFL after 1933. He remained active in football, playing for minor league and semi-professional teams, including the New York Brown Bombers, with whom he spent three seasons. Lillard was also a pitcher in Negro league baseball for five seasons from 1932 to 1944, and a guard in basketball for the future Harlem Globetrotters. After his athletic career, he became an appliance store employee and died in 1978.

== Early life ==
Born in Tulsa, then part of Indian Territory (later Oklahoma) to Joe Lillard and Annie Johnson, Lillard was the first of the couple's two children; Johnson also had a son from a previous marriage. Lillard took up baseball at the age of six; his other childhood hobbies included singing and tap dancing. His mother died when Lillard was nine, and his father had left about six years before that time. Afterwards, he moved in 1915, settling in Mason City, Iowa and moving in with relatives. Lillard attended Mason City High School, graduating in 1927. In basketball and football, Lillard won all-state honors, and claimed several Iowa track titles.

== College career ==
Although Lillard planned to attend the University of Minnesota, he changed his mind when Clarence Spears, the college's head football coach, left to go to the University of Oregon. Lillard decided to attend Oregon, and played for the school's freshman football team in 1930. The following year, he appeared in two games for the varsity team. Against Idaho, Lillard was responsible for all of Oregon's points in a 9–0 Ducks win. Suspected of breaking college amateurism rules by playing semi-professional baseball for the Gilkerson's Union Giants, Lillard was briefly suspended by the PCC before Oregon's next game. The suspected violation placed Lillard's collegiate eligibility in question. While he did play in games, Lillard claimed that he received money not for playing, but for driving the team. The decision was overturned; according to PCC rules, no protest was possible during the week prior to a game between PCC teams. In the game against Washington, their second of the season, the Ducks claimed an upset victory, 13–0; Lillard had a touchdown and intercepted two passes. Before Oregon's next game against USC, Lillard was ruled ineligible by the PCC as a result of playing with the Gilkerson baseball team under the assumed name of Joe Johnson. Spears estimated that Lillard had provided half of his team's production on offense, and USC defeated Oregon by 53 points in the game after the ruling. Lillard dropped out of the university after the PCC's decision, becoming a professional football player and playing for various All-Star teams that traveled across the United States.

== Professional American football career ==
After the end of his college career, Lillard participated in a professional all-star game on November 26, 1931; he helped his team to a win with a 55-yard touchdown run. In a second All-Star game, he recorded a 45-yard touchdown run for a Chicago-based team in a 20–6 win. These performances attracted the attention of NFL teams. For the 1932 NFL season, he joined the Chicago Cardinals. In his first NFL game, against the Portsmouth Spartans, Lillard converted an extra point attempt that helped secure a 7–7 tie. One week later, the Cardinals tied the eventual NFL champion Chicago Bears; Lillard's performance was praised in the Chicago Defender, which called him "the whole show". After wins against the Boston Braves and Providence Steamrollers (in a non-NFL contest), the number of plays in which Lillard was on the field for the Cardinals sharply declined. During the latter part of the 1932 season, "Lillard's teammates had stopped blocking for him", according to Coyle. Toward the end of the season, he was benched by the Cardinals; it is unknown whether this was because of an injury or a suspension. Jack Chevigny, the Cardinals' coach, indicated that Lillard had occasionally failed to attend practice, and had arrived late at other times. The lack of playing time for Lillard was attributed to internal disputes caused by "lackluster effort and a prideful attitude"; the Chicago Defender offered a different explanation, accusing Chevigny of racism towards Lillard. He ended the season with 121 rushing yards in 52 attempts, and nine successful passes in 28 attempts.

Lillard was primarily a backup in 1933, although he was one of the Cardinals' leading players when he received playing time. In the first game of the 1933 NFL season, against the Pittsburgh Pirates, he missed an extra point attempt that proved to be the margin separating the teams in a 14–13 Pirates' win. Lillard was subsequently ejected from the game, having been involved in a dispute with Pirates player Tony Holm. One week later, he threw a touchdown pass in a 7–6 loss to the Spartans, though he received criticism from local newspapers for a missed extra point attempt and a short punt that led to a Portsmouth score. In the Cardinals' third game of the season, against the Cincinnati Reds, Lillard kicked a fourth-quarter field goal to secure Chicago's lone win of the 1933 season. After the kick, Lillard was punched by Cincinnati guard Les Caywood; he responded with a punch to Caywood's head, and was thrown out of the game along with Caywood. He played a key role in the Cardinals' October 15, 1933 game against the Bears. In addition to converting a field goal attempt, he had 110 yards in punt returns, including a return of more than 50 yards in which he outran Bears star Red Grange for a touchdown. However, the Cardinals lost by a score of 12–9. In 1933, the Cardinals posted 52 points in 11 games; Lillard scored 19 himself and had two touchdown passes. He had 373 rushing yards from 119 attempts. The Chicago Defender called him "easily the best halfback in football". In addition, Lillard occasionally served as a quarterback for the Cardinals. Steven Ruiz of USA Today credited him as a starter at the position for the team in 1933.

During his time in the NFL, Lillard was regarded as a player with multiple talents, possessing the ability to complete passes and execute running and kicking plays. Author Charles Ross called him "a superior athlete" due to his skills in baseball and basketball, and added that in the NFL "arguably he was one of the best players in the league." He was frequently baited into fighting by opposing white players. His responses during these incidents went against cultural expectations for African-American athletes; Sports Illustrated's Daniel Coyle wrote that they "were regarded by all whites and many blacks as prideful foolishness, if not sheer lunacy." It is not known how other Cardinals players viewed Lillard. Cardinals coach Paul J. Schissler said that he was forced to remove Lillard from some games due to injuries suffered when teams "gave Joe the works". Lillard also received racial abuse from fans; author Alan Howard Levy wrote that spectators in Portsmouth, Ohio regularly taunted him when the Cardinals played there. After the 1933 season, Lillard was not retained by the Cardinals, and he did not play again in the NFL. The Cardinals' decision was criticized as racially motivated by African-American publications. Schissler acknowledged the existence of an unofficial regulation against African-American players in the NFL, and stated that the team's move was aimed at protecting them and Lillard from violence. In his two-year NFL career, he played in 18 games. Lillard had 171 rushing attempts, in which he gained 494 yards. Of his 95 attempted passes, he completed 27 for 372 yards. The media gave him the nickname of "The Midnight Express".

After his NFL career ended, Lillard joined the Westwood Cubs of the Pacific Coast Football League for the 1934 season, throwing the most touchdown passes of any player in the league and compiling the second-most touchdowns on runs. In 1935, he drew interest from coach Fritz Pollard, who was leading the New York Brown Bombers, a semi-professional team of African-American players. Based in Harlem, the team competed against minor league sides and clubs not affiliated with a league. Lillard had played for a Chicago team coached by Pollard before entering the NFL, and decided to join the Brown Bombers. In his first game with the team, on October 13, 1935, Lillard scored two touchdowns against the Cagle All-Stars in a 28–6 New York win. After three more victories, the Brown Bombers faced the Passaic Red Devils, a three-time champion of Eastern American football leagues. Despite suffering from an illness, Lillard converted a drop kick attempt and intercepted a pass, returning it 52 yards for a touchdown. He was responsible for all of the Brown Bombers' points in their 10–3 win over the Red Devils. Lillard stayed with the Brown Bombers through the 1937 season; the team went out of business in 1938. That year, he was a member of an All-Star team of black players that played an exhibition game against the Bears, losing 51–0.

In later years, Lillard played for various minor league sides; In 1938, he joined the American Association's (AA) Clifton Wessingtons, playing one season for the club and earning second-team AA all-star honors. The following year, he spent time with two AA teams: the Brooklyn Eagles and Union City Rams. Lillard was named captain of the Rams, making him the first African-American to earn that title on "a major mixed-race pro team." His final year in minor league football was 1941, as he played for a short period with the AA's New York Yankees.

== Professional baseball ==
Joe Lillard
- Pitcher, Outfielder, Catcher
- Batted: Right Threw: Right

debut
- 1932

Last appearance
- 1944

Teams
- Chicago American Giants (1932–1934), (1937); Cincinnati Tigers (1937); Indianapolis Clowns (1944); Birmingham Black Barons (1944)

In addition to his professional football career, Lillard was a right-handed pitcher, outfielder, and catcher in the Negro leagues for five seasons. Along with Sol Butler and Bobby Marshall, he was one of three Negro league baseball players to also compete in the NFL. Author Charles Ross wrote that "He possessed an exceptional fast ball, but erratic control."

In 1932, Lillard joined the Negro Southern League's Chicago American Giants and posted a 2–2 win–loss record. The Giants moved to the Negro National League before the start of the 1933 season, in which Lillard was the starting pitcher in five games and had a 4–0 record, along with a .387 batting average and two home runs as a hitter. He started twice in 1934, and did not record a decision on either occasion. Lillard did not play in any more recorded games until 1937, when he had an 0–1 record for the Giants, who by this time were playing in the Negro American League (NAL).

Lillard is credited with six at bats for the Cincinnati Tigers in 1937, though he was also listed on the team's pitching staff for several exhibition games. His final Negro league season was 1944; Lillard played with the NAL's Cincinnati/Indianapolis Clowns, and the Birmingham Black Barons. In 1949 and 1950, Lillard played for El Águila de Veracruz of the Mexican League.

== Professional basketball ==
Lillard spent several years on the Savoy Big Five basketball team as a guard. In 1934 he started his own club named the Chicago Hottentots, who mostly toured Wisconsin and Iowa. He joined the Harlem Globetrotters in 1937.

== Later life and legacy ==
In the late 1930s, Lillard began writing a column on sports in the Independent News. Later in his life, he moved to Astoria, Queens, working at an appliance store and for Vinn Sporting Goods. Lillard had a stroke on September 18, 1978, and was afflicted with agnosia as a result; he died in New York City's Bellevue Hospital Center.

Lillard was the 12th black player in the history of the NFL. After five African-Americans appeared in NFL games during the 1926 season, the number of black players in the league had declined to between one and two each season until Lillard entered the league. He was the lone African-American playing in the NFL in 1932 and one of two in 1933; the other was Ray Kemp, a tackle with the Pirates. Following the 1933 season, an unofficial gentlemen's agreement was reached between the NFL's owners not to employ African-American players. Incoming segregationist Boston Redskins owner George Preston Marshall was thought to have been behind the agreement. After the introduction of an unofficial color line, no African-American played in the NFL until 1946, when Kenny Washington and Woody Strode joined the Los Angeles Rams. Author Charles Ross wrote that "NFL owners may have used Lillard's volatile personality as an excuse to ban other black athletes."

== See also ==
- Racial issues faced by black quarterbacks

== Bibliography ==
- Carroll, John M. (1998). Fritz Pollard: Pioneer in Racial Advancement. Chicago: University of Illinois Press. ISBN 978-0-252-06799-0.
- Levy, Ryan Howard (2003). Tackling Jim Crow: Racial Segregation in Professional Football. Jefferson, North Carolina: McFarland & Company. ISBN 978-0-7864-1597-7.
- MacCambridge, Michael (2004). America's Game: The Epic Story of How Pro Football Captured a Nation. New York City: Random House. ISBN 978-0-375-50454-9.
- McKenna, Brian (2007). Early Exits: The Premature Endings of Baseball Careers. Lanham, Maryland: Scarecrow Press. ISBN 978-0-8108-5858-9.
- Piascik, Andy (2007). The Best Show in Football: The 1946–1955 Cleveland Browns. Lanham, Maryland: Taylor Trade Publishing. ISBN 978-1-58979-571-6.
- Piascik, Andy (2011). Gridiron Gauntlet: The Story of the Men Who Integrated Pro Football in Their Own Words. Lanham, Maryland: Taylor Trade Publishing. ISBN 978-1-58979-652-2.
- Ross, Charles (2001). Outside the Lines: African Americans and the Integration of the National Football League. New York City: New York University Press. ISBN 978-0-8147-7496-0.
