= Dan M. Rooney =

American football executive/owner, philanthropist and diplomat (1932–2017)

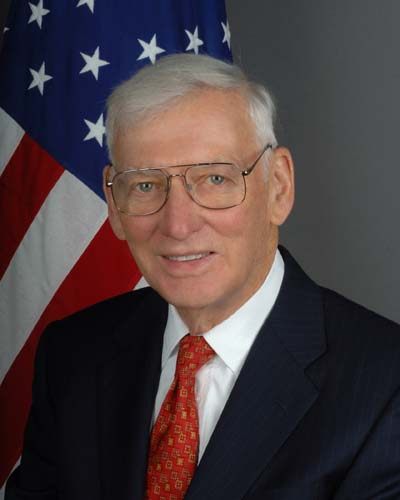
- Official portrait, 2009

United States Ambassador to Ireland
- In office July 3, 2009 – December 14, 2012
- President: Barack Obama
- Preceded by: Thomas C. Foley
- Succeeded by: Kevin O'Malley

Personal details
- Born: Daniel Milton Rooney; July 20, 1932 Pittsburgh, Pennsylvania, U.S.
- Died: April 13, 2017 (aged 84) Pittsburgh, Pennsylvania, U.S.
- Party: Republican
- Spouse: Patricia Regan (m. 1952–2017)
- Children: 9, including Art Rooney II
- Parent(s): Art Rooney; Kathleen McNulty
- Relatives: Rooney family Kate Mara (grandniece); Rooney Mara (grandniece)
- Education: Duquesne University
- Awards: CBE (honorary)
- Football career

Profile
- Position: President/Owner

Career information
- High school: Cranberry (PA) North Catholic
- College: Duquesne

Career history
- Pittsburgh Steelers (1969–1970) General manager; Pittsburgh Steelers (1975–2002) President; Pittsburgh Steelers (1988–2016) Owner

Awards and highlights
- 6× Super Bowl champion (IX, X, XIII, XIV, XL, XLIII); Pittsburgh Steelers Hall of Honor
- Pro Football Hall of Fame

Daniel Milton Rooney (July 20, 1932 – April 13, 2017) was an American professional football executive and diplomat best known for his association with the Pittsburgh Steelers of the National Football League (NFL), and son of the Steelers' founder, Art Rooney. He held various roles within the organization, most notably as president, owner and chairman.

Rooney implemented a philosophy and management style that emphasized open, practical and efficient management. The Steelers were very successful during his tenure, winning 15 division championships, eight AFC Championships, and an NFL record six Super Bowl Championships. In 2000, he was elected to the Pro Football Hall of Fame for his contributions to the game. He was also credited with spearheading a requirement that NFL teams with head coach and general manager vacancies interview at least one minority candidate, which has become known as the "Rooney Rule".

Outside of football, Rooney served as the United States Ambassador to Ireland, from July 2009 until his resignation in December 2012. He was also co-founder of the Ireland-related fundraising organization The Ireland Funds.

== Early life and college ==
Daniel Milton Rooney was born in Pittsburgh, the son of Kathleen (née McNulty) and Pittsburgh Steelers' owner Art Rooney. In the Steelers organization, Rooney was involved in many aspects of the franchise from the time he was a young boy, often assisting his father at Pitt Stadium and Forbes Field. He grew up in the North Side neighborhood of Pittsburgh and attended North Catholic High School where he excelled as the team's quarterback. He was also the coach for the St. Peter's Elementary school football team, which was quarterbacked by future CIA Director and lifelong friend Michael Hayden. Rooney was mentored by Fran Fogerty, Joe Carr and Ed Kiely. These men assisted in teaching him the business of football.

Rooney attended Duquesne University, majoring in accounting. During his time at Duquesne, he was briefly a classmate of future Steelers head coach Bill Cowher's father, Laird Cowher. Rooney graduated with a degree in accounting in 1954.

== Executive career ==
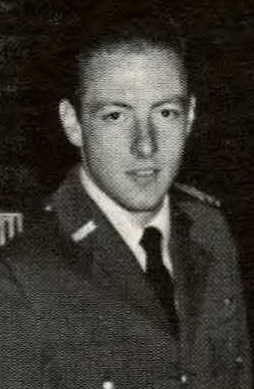
Rooney as a college student (c. 1955)

In 1960, Rooney originally worked as director of personnel for the Steelers. In 1969, Rooney was appointed by his father to be the team's general manager, succeeding Francis Fogarty, who retired following the 1968 season. Rooney's first season as general manager saw him select Joe Greene third overall, who later became a staple of the team's Steel Curtain defense throughout their 1970s dynasty teams. After a poor outing in 1969 with a 1–13 record, Rooney stepped down from the general manager position, instead hiring Dick Haley. Hiring Haley proved fruitful for the team as he acquired the 1974 draft class which featured four future Hall of Fame players.

By early 1969, Rooney was managing the day-to-day operations of the team and personally selected the coaching hire of Chuck Noll. Rooney was appointed team president in 1975 and was officially given full operational control of the franchise. His father remained chairman and President Emeritus, as well as the public face of the franchise, until his death in 1988. Rooney oversaw all six championship teams for the Steelers between Super Bowl IX and Super Bowl XLIII and played a role in hiring all three of the Steelers' head coaches in 1969, 1992 and 2007.

Rooney generally avoided the spotlight, but he was a very active owner behind the scenes. Rooney helped lead the negotiations of the collective bargaining agreement of 1982, and is largely credited both by owners and players for ending a strike that lasted half of the season. He was also one of the main architects of the salary cap, which was implemented in 1993. Rooney became the patriarch and controlling owner of the team, following the death of his father. In 2003, Rooney followed in his father's footsteps by slowly ceding day-to-day operations of the franchise to the next generation of the family. While Rooney was still chairman, and to many fans, the public face of the team, his son Art Rooney II assumed full operational control of the Steelers.

In 1995, Rooney tried to stop the Steelers' biggest rival, the Cleveland Browns, from moving to Baltimore. He and Buffalo Bills owner Ralph Wilson were the only owners to vote against the move and he was a driving force in ensuring the Browns return to Cleveland in 1999.

The Steelers' selection of quarterback Ben Roethlisberger in the 2004 NFL draft is often credited to Rooney. According to Bill Cowher, Cowher originally wanted to select offensive lineman Shawn Andrews with the 11th overall pick as he was "comfortable" with incumbent quarterbacks Tommy Maddox and Charlie Batch. Rooney made the final call on the pick, not wanting to miss out on another opportunity draft a franchise quarterback after the team passed on Dan Marino in 1983. Roethlisberger's selection ended a quarterback drought for the franchise that persisted since Terry Bradshaw's retirement in 1983 and led to three Super Bowl appearances between 2005 and 2010.

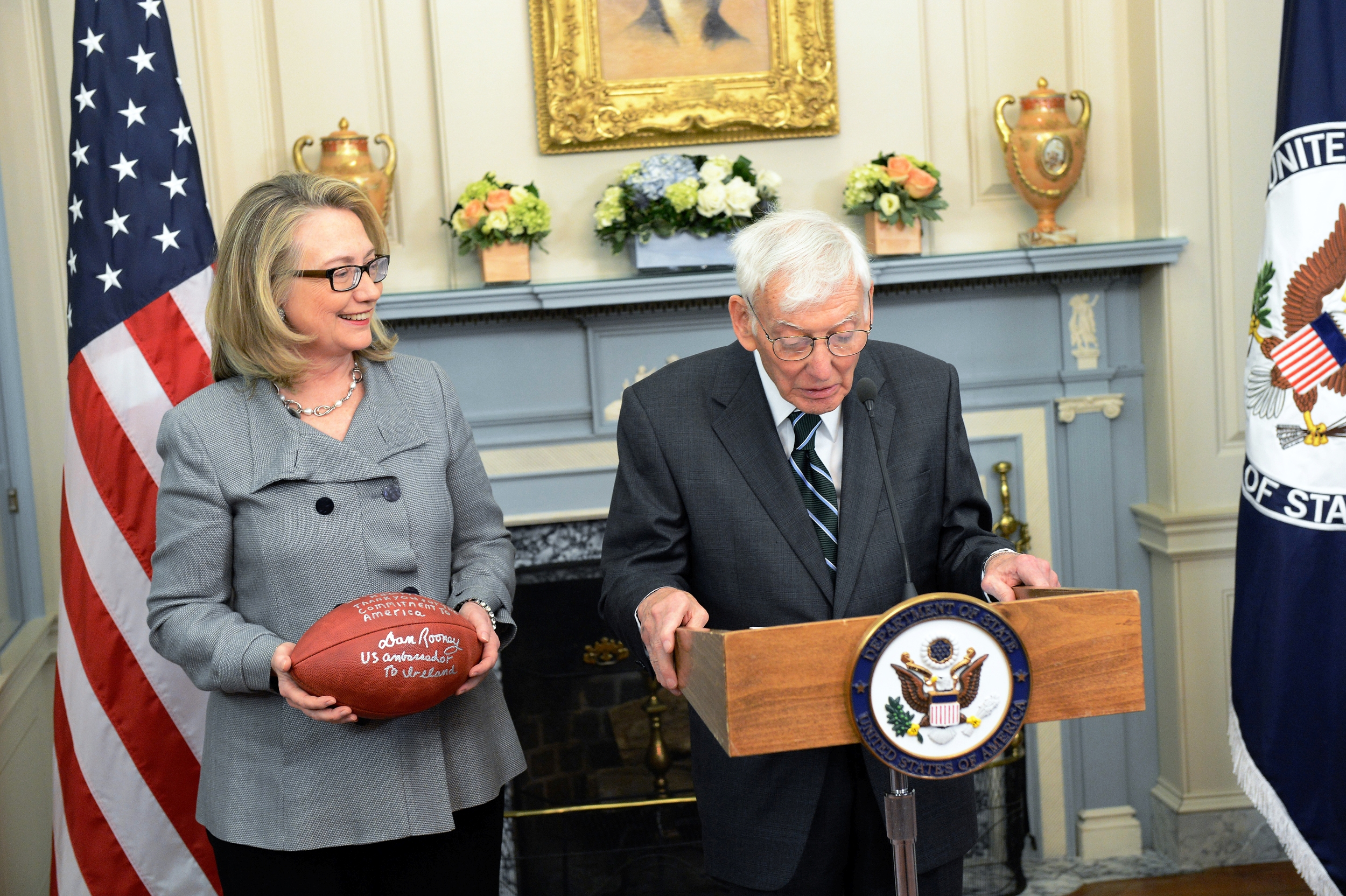
Rooney with Hillary Clinton, posing with an autographed game ball in 2013

Rooney was considered to be patient with the team. In 1969, head coach Chuck Noll led the team to a record of 1–13, the worst in franchise history. Rooney chose to retain Noll for the 1970 season and gave him a slight raise for his efforts during the season. Rooney never waned on his faith in Noll, retaining him despite several poor seasons near the end of his tenure and allowed him to retire in 1991 rather than firing him. Throughout the 1998 and 1999 seasons, Rooney retained Bill Cowher as the team's head coach despite recording a combined record of 13–19 with two consecutive losing seasons. Rooney dismissed the notion of firing Cowher in February 2000 amidst rumors he would not return in 2000 stating "We all recognize that we have a lot of hard work to do in the months ahead, and I am concerned that ongoing speculation about these meetings could get in the way of what we are trying to accomplish." Cowher would later lead his team to two consecutive AFC Championship appearances in 2004 and 2005, winning Super Bowl XL following the latter.

Though Rooney never officially retired from his position, his involvement waned in the 2010s. Following the team's Super Bowl XLV defeat, much of the Rooneys' operations were handled by Dan's son Art Rooney II. In Rooney's final season with the team, the Steelers finished with an 11–5 record and claimed the AFC North title for the second time in three years. The team led a playoff run, ending with a 36–17 loss to the New England Patriots in the AFC Championship.

=== Sale of the Steelers ===
On July 7, 2008, Rooney and his son, team president Art Rooney II, announced that they were seeking to buy out his brothers' shares in the team. The team initially said that some of Rooney's four brothers want to "get out of the NFL and focus their business efforts on their racetracks and other interests." The Wall Street Journal reported that the Steelers had "been secretly shopped to potential buyers amid continuing divisions among the five sons of the team's founder, Art Rooney Sr." This forced the Steelers to announce that prolonged, ongoing negotiations were under way concerning the "restructuring" of ownership, which could have resulted in the sale of the franchise or a consolidation of control within the Rooney family. Discussions had supposedly been taking place for the last two years. The use of the phrase "ensure compliance with NFL ownership policies" referred to the family's gambling operation. At the time of publication, they owned Yonkers Raceway, a harness racing track outside of New York City, and Palm Beach Kennel Club, a greyhound racetrack in West Palm Beach. The New York racetrack had been owned by the family since 1972, and the Florida racetrack had been owned since 1970. The team said "these facilities have added forms of gaming that are inconsistent with NFL gambling policy.", relating to the then-recent installation of slot machines. According to league policy, no NFL owner may own, directly or indirectly, any interests in a gambling casino. The NFL defines any facility with slot machines as a casino.

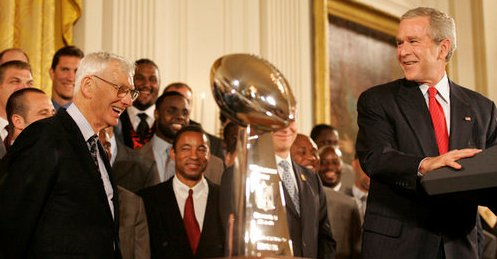
Rooney (left), with President George W. Bush in June 2006 after winning Super Bowl XL

The Steelers' statement said that NFL commissioner Roger Goodell asked former NFL commissioner Paul Tagliabue to "serve as a league representative in discussions with the family in order to reach an agreement on the separation of the gambling interests and on a restructuring of ownership if the team is sold." Any sale involving an NFL team is subject to a league review and must be approved by 75% of member clubs. The Steelers were valued at $929 million by Forbes magazine in September 2007. However, Rooney's brothers: Art Jr., Tim, Patrick and John released a statement confirming that they retained Goldman, Sachs & Co. to put a price tag on the franchise, and analysts in New York placed its value between $800 million and $1.2 billion. Their shares were likely worth more than Dan and Art II had offered in the initial buyout, and it could have raised even higher and still remain under the NFL's ceiling of $150 million in ownership debt. Each Rooney brothers' stake was worth about $160 million, or less than Dan was believed to be offering. Art Jr. was the brother who might have determined if the majority of the team remains in the Rooney family. He was formerly a Pro Football Hall of Fame nominee for his drafting skills, and was fired by Dan in 1987. The brothers likely would not have retained Goldman Sachs if they felt they could soon work out a deal with Dan. The move also reflected their fears that selling to Dan, coupled with the ensuing taxes, could leave their children and grandchildren with far less money than their shares are worth. There was also concern if any of the brothers were to die without a change in ownership, their heirs would face estate taxes of up to 45% of the shares' value. Rooney worked with Morgan Stanley and PNC Financial Services to attempt to bring in additional investors who might prop up his buyout attempt.

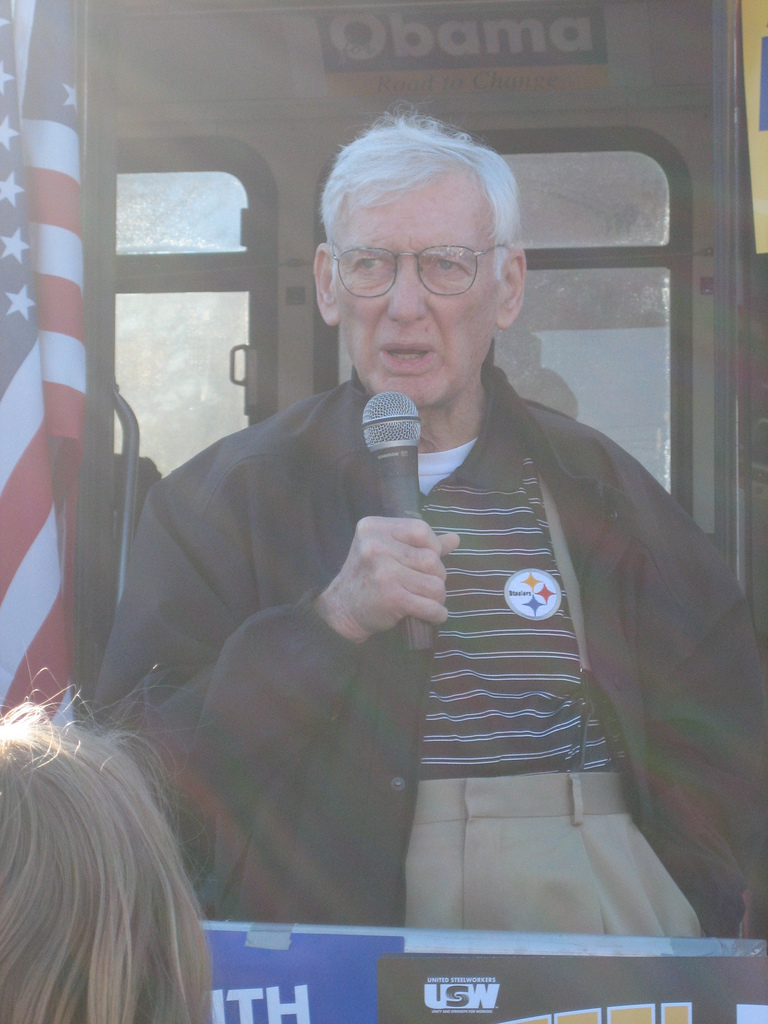
Rooney speaking at an event in 2008

According to The Wall Street Journal, Duquesne Capital Management chairman Stanley Druckenmiller was apparently interested in acquiring the team. On July 8, The Associated Press reported that a deal could be reached within days to sell a majority interest in the Steelers to Druckenmiller, taking control of the franchise away from the Rooney family. However Rooney, stopped short of guaranteeing that he and his son, would be able to stay at the helm of a team. He hinted that "many people," not just Druckenmiller, might be interested in the NFL franchise. Later, NFL spokesman Greg Aiello stated that the NFL would continue to support the Rooneys in their efforts to retain control of the Steelers, and maintained the franchise would not relocate to another city, only that the ownership will either change or be consolidated.

On November 21, the Pittsburgh Post-Gazette reported that Tim and Pat planned to sell each of their 16% stakes in the Steelers, so they could remain involved in racetracks and casinos in Yonkers and West Palm Beach. John and Art Jr. each planned to keep a little less than half of their 16% stake, and Dan and Art II, were trying to acquire 30% of the team to abide by NFL policy and compiled a list of investors who, in essence, would become their new partners in the franchise.

== Rooney rule ==
Much like his father, Rooney was an advocate for minorities in the NFL. Under Rooney (along with head coach Chuck Noll), the Steelers made waves with giving a starting role to quarterback Joe Gilliam, who was black.

His involvement with working with young minorities did not end with Gilliam. Rooney spearheaded the implementation of the Rooney rule, of which he is the namesake. The rule states all NFL teams must interview a minority candidate for a vacant coaching position. The Rooney rule went into effect after the 2003 NFL season after concerns were raised about the lack of minority head coaches in the NFL. At the time, the league had very few minority coaches despite a significant number of minority players. The Rooney Rule was designed to encourage teams to provide equal opportunities for all candidates, aiming to increase the representation of minorities in coaching and executive positions. Over the years, the rule has been amended and expanded to include requirements for interviews for coordinator and other senior positions.

== Controversies ==
=== James Harrison vs. Cedrick Wilson ===
On March 19, 2008, Rooney released wide receiver Cedrick Wilson from the Steelers, after he was arrested for punching his former girlfriend. However earlier that month, on March 8, Rooney failed to offer any type of discipline to linebacker James Harrison for slapping his girlfriend. When asked about the incident involving Wilson, Rooney stated that "the Steelers do not condone violence of any kind, especially against women". However, he was then confronted about this by Ed Bouchette and Michael A. Fuoco of the Pittsburgh Post-Gazette, who asked why Harrison was not punished for committing the same crime. Rooney said that the cases were different and stated that "I know many are asking the question of [why] we released Wilson and Harrison we kept. The circumstances—I know of the incidents, they are completely different. In fact, when I say we don't condone these things, we don't, but we do have to look at the circumstances that are involved with other players and things like that, so they're not all the same. What James Harrison was doing and how the incident occurred, what he was trying to do was really well worth it. He was doing something that was good, wanted to take his son to get baptized where he lived and things like that. She said she didn't want to do it."

Rooney later said that Harrison had no intention of harming his girlfriend when he went to her house to pick up his son. "The situation angered him. He didn't go there with intent." Meanwhile, Rooney stated that the Wilson case was different. According to Rooney "[Wilson] knew what he was doing. He knew where his [former] girlfriend was and went to the bar looking for her. When he got there he punched her. That's different and I understand he expressed no regret.

Afterwards, Rooney was criticized by the Women's Center and Shelter of Pittsburgh as a result of his comments. ESPN's Matt Mosley later wrote that Rooney's attempt to "explain that Harrison's heart was in the right place ... had to be one of the worst Public Relations moments in club history."

=== Steelers taxes and taxpayer funding ===
In August 2004, Pittsburgh Tribune-Review writer Bill Steigerwald reported that Rooney's team received $5 million in state funds for a new, $12 million amphitheater. This was in addition to the $158 million in public subsidies the organization received to build Heinz Field. Steigerwald wrote that: Since the Steelers don't own any taxable property, the Rooneys dodge city and county real estate taxes. Heinz Field, which the Steelers operate and profit from in myriad ways, is owned by taxpayers through the Sports and Exhibition Authority. The team offices, practice field and workout facilities are leased from UPMC's tax-exempt Sports Performance Complex. Steelers players pay payroll and occupation taxes like everyone else. Fans pay the 5 percent city amusement tax on each ticket. But the Steelers - like a few other profit-making corporations - aren't exempt from paying both a city mercantile tax (3 mills on concessions, etc.) and a city business privilege tax (6 mills on gross receipts). Tax officials say these taxes are highly complicated to compute – and the final amounts the Steelers pay are top secret.

== Ambassador to Ireland ==
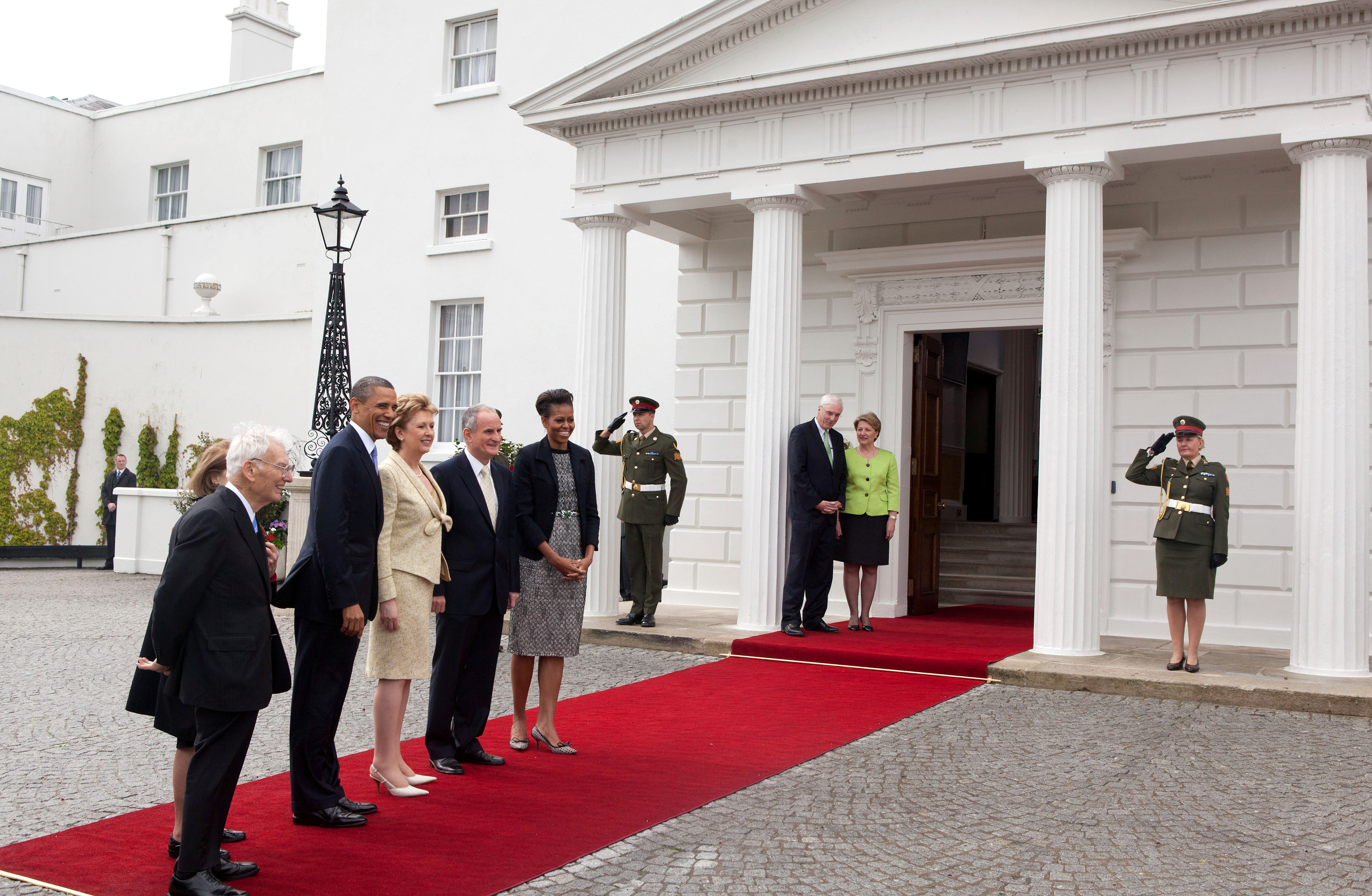
Rooney with President Obama and President McAleese at Áras an Uachtaráin in May 2011

On March 17, 2009, President Obama announced he had nominated Rooney to become the next U.S. ambassador to Ireland, citing the owner's longstanding support for Irish-American charitable causes. In 2008, Rooney gave $30,000 to a Democratic Party committee that aided Obama's campaign, according to CQ MoneyLine, a non-partisan group that tracks political contributions. According to David Lewis, a Vanderbilt University political scientist and the author of The Politics of Presidential Appointments, "giving coveted ambassadorships to political supporters is a relatively low-risk way for presidents to repay campaign debts."

Secretary of State Hillary Clinton swore him in as the new ambassador to Ireland on July 1, 2009. Rooney presented his credentials to Irish President Mary McAleese on July 3, before making his first official speaking engagement at a lunch hosted by the American Chamber of Commerce Ireland. In a leaked diplomatic cable to Clinton in 2009 Rooney described Irish politics as having an "often unaccountable political class" which allows itself "perks".

In an April 2011 interview with The Irish Times, Rooney mentioned that he would consider resigning his ambassadorship in order to campaign for Obama's re-election. In a prepared statement released after that interview was published. Rooney stated, "I was asked what I could do to help [Obama] in the next election and I responded that the best thing I could do would be to help him campaign. Were I to do so, it would require my resignation as ambassador to Ireland. However, I am very pleased with my accomplishments to date and I intend to continue to carry out my duties." On December 14, 2012, he resigned as ambassador to Ireland and returned to Pittsburgh. He would eventually be replaced in June 2014 by Kevin O'Malley.

== Personal life ==
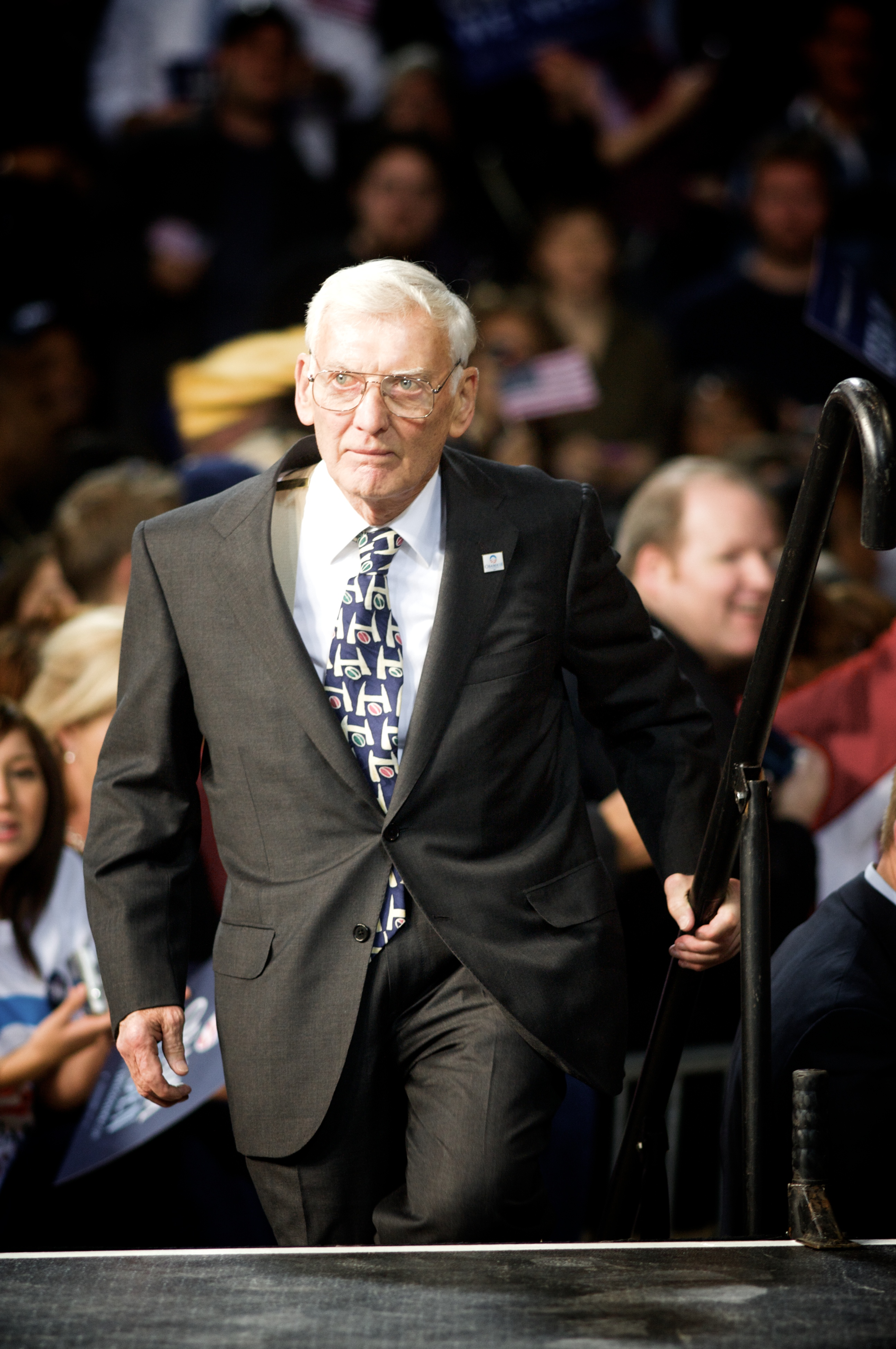
Rooney in October 2008, at an Obama rally

Rooney was married to his wife Patricia Regan for sixty-five years. They first met in the office of the Steelers where she was working, and got married soon after. The couple had nine children together, although he was predeceased by two of his daughters. Rooney was also the maternal great-uncle of actresses Kate Mara and her sister Rooney Mara.

In 2008, he surprised many with his public endorsement of Barack Obama for president. The family had traditionally been very private on politics, even being rumored to have a Republican bent. Rooney responded to his public endorsement with: "When I think of Barack Obama's America I have great hope. I support his candidacy and look forward to his Presidency."

Rooney was the benefactor of the Rooney Prize for Irish Literature and vice-chairman of The American Ireland Fund. He was also a founding chairman of The Mentoring Partnership of Southwestern Pennsylvania. He was named to the PoliticsPA list of most influential individuals in Pennsylvania politics in 2002. In 2008, Rooney became an honorary Commander of the Most Excellent Order of the British Empire. He won the 2009 Jack Horrigan Memorial Award, presented by the Pro Football Writers Association to honor a league or club official "for his or her qualities and professional style in helping the pro football writers do their job." He was recognized in 2016 with a Lifetime Achievement Award from the Jackie Robinson Foundation.

=== Death ===
Rooney died at the age of 84 on April 13, 2017. Attendees at his funeral in Pittsburgh included former president Barack Obama and former secretary of state John Kerry. His burial was in Christ Our Redeemer Catholic Cemetery, Ross Township, Pennsylvania.

== See also ==
- List of U.S. political appointments that crossed party lines

Diplomatic posts
Preceded by Thomas C. Foley	United States Ambassador to Ireland; 2009–2012	Succeeded by Kevin O'Malley
Sporting positions
Vacant	Chairman of the Pittsburgh Steelers; 2003–2017	Vacant
Preceded by Art Rooney	President of the Pittsburgh Steelers; 1975–2002	Succeeded by Art Rooney II
