= John Holahan =

American sports executive (1904–1975)

Personal information
- Born: August 7, 1904; Leetsdale, Pennsylvania, U.S.
- Died: November 26, 1975 (aged 71); Pittsburgh, Pennsylvania, U.S.

Career information
- College: Duquesne

Career history
- Duquesne (1927–1941) Business manager; Card-Pitt (1944) Public relations director; Pittsburgh Steelers (1945–1950) General manager
- Executive profile at Pro Football Reference

John D. Holahan (August 7, 1904 – November 26, 1975) was an American sports executive. A graduate of Duquesne University, he managed the school's athletic program from 1927 to 1941. He later served as the general manager of the Pittsburgh Steelers from 1945 to 1950.

== Early life ==
John D. Holahan was born on August 7, 1904, in Leetsdale, Pennsylvania. After attending the Duquesne Preparatory School starting in 1919, he later attended Duquesne University, where he graduated in 1928.

== Executive career ==
As a senior at Duquesne, Holahan became the athletic program's business manager. He remained with the team after his graduation in the position of graduate manager. He was credited with helping the Duquesne Dukes football team establish itself in "the big time", according to The Pittsburgh Press. In 1928, he was able to arrange a game against the Washington & Jefferson Presidents, which, with Duquesne's win, "paved the way for future bookings", including a game against major school Pittsburgh.

In 1929, the team was struggling financially and Holahan said that "I knew we had to do something drastic or quit football." He was able to work out a plan where the team would play Geneva at Forbes Field at night. He was initially called a "lunatic" for his idea by the school president Martin Hehir, but Holahan's idea proved to be a major success and Hehir later came to him and said, "I was the lunatic, not you." He ultimately remained as Duquesne's manager through 1941 with the exception of 1931, when he was the traveling secretary for the Pittsburgh Pirates. He helped the team reach the Orange Bowl on two occasions, including defeats of both Miami and Mississippi State.

Holahan registered for World War II in 1942. In 1944, he joined the Pittsburgh Steelers (who played that year as the Card-Pitt due to a merger with the Chicago Cardinals) as public relations director. He was promoted to general manager of the team in 1945 as they compiled a record of 2–8. The team went 5–5–1 in 1946 before reaching the playoffs with a 8–4 record in 1947, losing to the Philadelphia Eagles in a game that determined which team would play in the 1947 NFL Championship Game. In subsequent seasons the team went 4–8 (1948), 6–5–1 (1949) and 6–6 (1950). Holahan compiled an overall record of 31–36–2 as Steelers general manager.

In early 1951, Holahan was appointed the state boxing commissioner and to the state athletic board, leading to his resignation from the Steelers. He served two years on the state athletic commission and helped Pittsburgh be the host of two championship boxing matches.

== Personal life and death ==
Holahan was a Republican politician and was elected to the Brentwood Borough Council, later becoming a justice of the peace. He was a member of the Ancient Order of Hibernians, for which he was a county president, and served as president of the Brentwood-Whitehall Alumni Club at Duquesne. He also was part of the Pittsburgh Steelers Alumni Association, Brentwood Volunteer Fire Company, Brentwood Heart Fund drive, was a committeeman for the St. Sylvester Church, and spent 13 years as an administrator at the John J. Kane Hospital in Pittsburgh. He was married and had three daughters.

Holahan died on November 26, 1975, at the John J. Kane Hospital in Pittsburgh, from a long illness, at the age of 71. The Pittsburgh Post-Gazette, in describing his career, noted that "Mr. Holahan, who occasionally seemed gruff to outsiders, was considered an efficient and hard-working executive."
