= Art Rooney =

American football player, executive, and owner (1901–1988)

- Image of Rooney from "BELIEVE" posters

Profile
- Position: Owner

Personal information
- Born: January 27, 1901; Coulterville, Pennsylvania, U.S.
- Died: August 25, 1988 (aged 87); Pittsburgh, Pennsylvania, U.S.

Career information
- High school: Duquesne University Prep
- College: Indiana Normal, Georgetown

Career history
- J.P. Rooneys (1931–1932) Owner; Pittsburgh Pirates/Steelers (1933–1988) Chairman & owner

Awards and highlights
- As owner: 4× Super Bowl champion (IX, X, XIII, XIV); Pittsburgh Steelers Hall of Honor
- Pro Football Hall of Fame

Arthur Joseph Rooney Sr. (January 27, 1901 – August 25, 1988), often referred to as "the Chief", was an American professional football executive. He was the founding owner of the Pittsburgh Steelers, an American football franchise in the National Football League (NFL), from 1933 until his death. Rooney is a member of the Pro Football Hall of Fame, was an Olympic qualifying boxer, and was part or whole owner in several track sport venues and Pittsburgh area pro teams. He was the first president of the Pittsburgh Steelers from 1933 to 1974, and the first chairman of the team from 1933 until his death in 1988.

== Family history ==
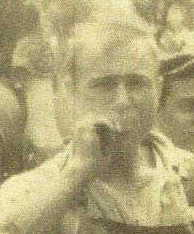
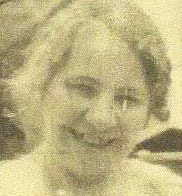
Rooney's parents, Dan and Margaret (Murray) Rooney (c.1910)

Rooney's great-grandparents, James and Mary Rooney, were Irish Catholics who emigrated from Newry in County Down, Northern Ireland to Canada during the Great Famine in the 1840s. While living in Montreal, the Rooneys had a son, Arthur (who would become Art Rooney's grandfather). James and Mary later moved to Ebbw Vale, Wales, where the iron industry was flourishing, taking their son Arthur, then 21, with them. This Arthur Rooney married Catherine Regan (who was also Irish Catholic), in Wales, and they had a son, Dan. Two years after Dan Rooney was born, the family moved back to Canada and eventually ended up in Pittsburgh, Pennsylvania in 1884. Along the way the family grew to include nine children of which Dan was the second.

Dan Rooney remained in the Pittsburgh area, and eventually opened a saloon in the Youghiogheny Valley coal town of Coulter, Pennsylvania (or Coultersville). This is where Dan Rooney met and wed Margaret "Maggie" Murray, who was the daughter of a coal miner, and where the couple's first son, Arthur Joseph Rooney, was born. Dan and Maggie would eventually settle their family in Pittsburgh's North Side in 1913, where they bought a three-story building at the corner of Corey Street and General Robinson Street. Dan operated a cafe and saloon out of the first floor with the family living above. The building was located just a block from Exposition Park, which had been home to the Pittsburgh Pirates baseball team until 1909.

Rooney had a brother, Silas Rooney, who later entered the priesthood. Silas Rooney eventually became the athletic director for St. Bonaventure University in 1947 and invited the Steelers to play their training camp at the university in the 1950s. Another brother, James P. Rooney, later was elected to the Pennsylvania General Assembly, winning easily in part because Art had renamed the team after James, who also played on the squad, as a promotional tactic.

== Education and athletics ==
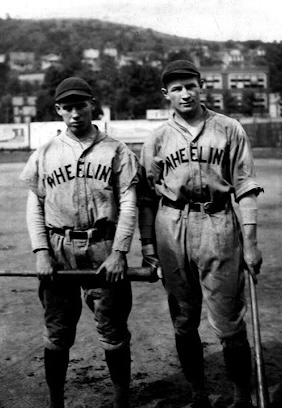
Art and Dan Rooney with the Stogies in 1925

Rooney attended St. Peter's Catholic School in Pittsburgh, Duquesne University Prep School, then several semesters at Indiana Normal School before completing a final year at Temple University on an athletic scholarship. He was awarded for his athleticism at Indiana (now the Indiana University of Pennsylvania) by being posthumously inducted into the IUP athletic Hall of Fame in 1997. He spent his time there participating on both the basketball and football teams while also playing centerfielder for the Crimson Hawks baseball team.

After his high school graduation in 1919, he dedicated himself to sports. Initially, Rooney became an accomplished boxer, winning the AAU welterweight belt in 1918 and tried out for the 1920 Olympic Team,

He played minor league baseball for both the Flint, Michigan "Vehicles" and the Wheeling, West Virginia "Stogies". In 1925 he served as Wheeling's player-manager and led the Middle Atlantic League in games, hits, runs, stolen bases and finished second in batting average (his brother Dan Rooney, Wheeling's catcher that year, finished third).

Rooney also played the halfback position for the semi-pro Pittsburgh "Hope Harvey" and "Majestic Radio" clubs, the former of which he later took over and renamed the J.P. Rooneys before purchasing an NFL franchise for $2,500 in 1933 following the repeal of Pennsylvania's blue laws. During this time, Rooney served as the team's general manager, head coach and owner. His team played games at the former Exposition Park on the Northside.

== Pittsburgh Steelers ==
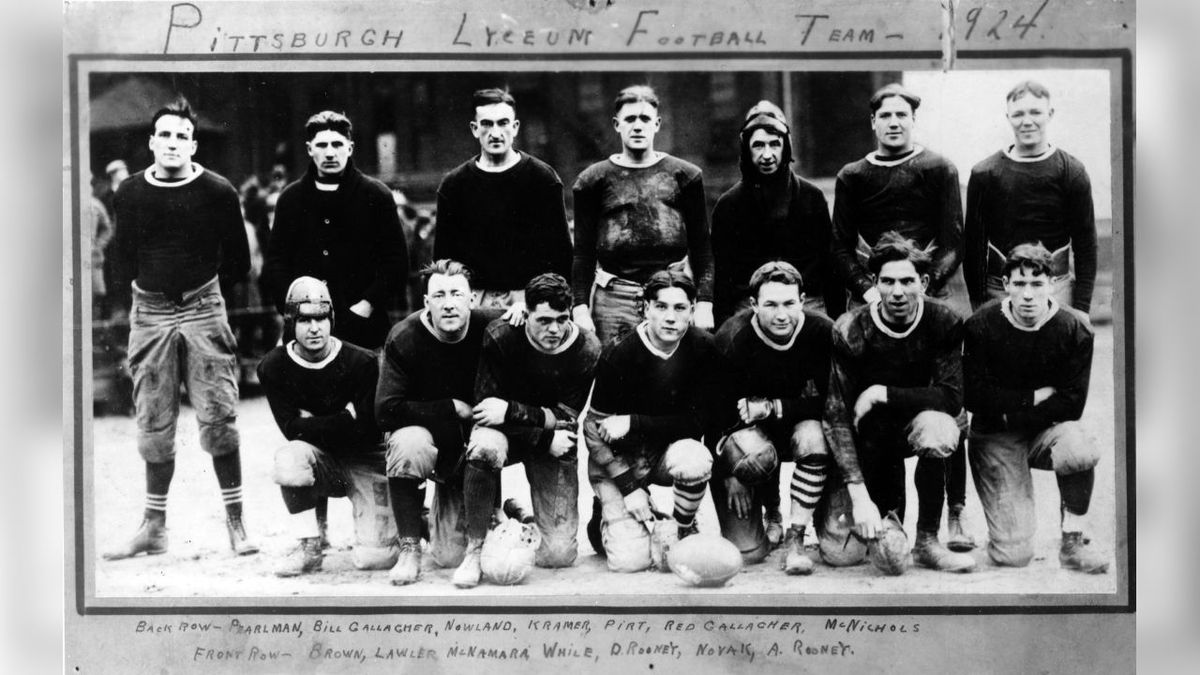
Rooney (front, far right) as a player with the J.P. Rooneys in 1924

Rooney's affiliation with the National Football League (NFL) began in 1933 when he paid a $2,500 franchise fee to found a club based in the city of Pittsburgh. He named his new team the "Pirates", after the city's baseball team, of which Rooney was a fan since childhood.

Since the league's inception in 1920, the NFL had wanted a team in Pittsburgh due to the city's already-long history with football as well as the popularity of the Pittsburgh Panthers football team, an NCAA national championship contender during this period. The league was finally able to take advantage of Pennsylvania relaxing their blue laws that prior to 1933 prohibited sporting events from taking place on Sundays, when most NFL games take place.

Rooney in 1934

In 1936, Rooney won a parlay at Saratoga Race Course, which netted him about $160,000. He placed the bet based on a tip from New York Giants owner Tim Mara, a bookmaker. He used the winnings to hire a coach, Joe Bach, give contracts to his players and almost win a championship. The winnings funded the team until 1941 when he sold the franchise to NY playboy Alex Thompson. Thompson wanted to move the franchise to Boston so he could be within a five-hour train ride of his club. At the same time, the Philadelphia Eagles ran into financial problems. Rooney used the funds from the sale of the franchise to get a 70% interest in the Eagles, the other 30% held by Rooney friend and future NFL commissioner, Bert Bell. Bell and Rooney agreed to trade places with Thompson. Bell took the role of President of the Steelers that he relinquished to Rooney in 1946 when Bell became Commissioner. Rooney got his good friend and his sister's father in law, Barney McGinley, to buy Bell's shares. Barney's son Jack, Art's brother in law, retained the McGinley interest that passed to his heirs when he died in 2006.

Howard Cosell on the Rooneys

The Rooneys are the finest people, the people I most respect in American sports ownership. I've always felt that way. And there's no reason to change. They are people of integrity and character. The way they put the Steelers together, to hire a man like Chuck Noll, to emphasize the team concept. I have a whole transcendental feeling for the Steelers and the Rooneys and Pittsburgh.

— Howard Cosell, October 1982

Rooney sent shock waves through the NFL by signing Byron "Whizzer" White to a record-breaking $15,000 contract in 1938. This move, however, did not bring the Pirates a winning season, and White left the team for the Detroit Lions the following year. The club did not have a season above .500 until 1942, the year after they were renamed the Pittsburgh Steelers.

During World War II, the Steelers had some financial difficulties and were merged with the Philadelphia Eagles in 1943 and the Chicago Cardinals in 1944. Under the "Steagles" moniker in 1943, the team went 5-4-1, which was the Steelers' best record in franchise history at the time, though no playoff success occurred for the season. When they combined with the Cardinals the following season, the team took a step backwards, not being able to record a single victory. The Card-Pitt team was deemed the worst in the league for the 1944 season, going 0–10 and scoring only 108 points in 10 games. They were outscored in blowout fashion every game, allowing 328 points. This would be the final time Pittsburgh would combine with another team's roster.

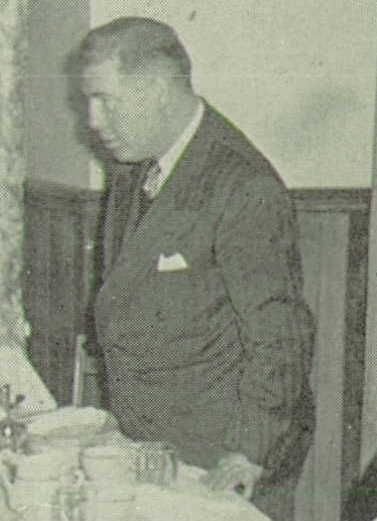
Rooney at Saint Vincent College Preparatory School in 1952

After the war, Rooney became team president. He longed to bring an NFL title to Pittsburgh but was never able to beat the powerhouse teams, like the Cleveland Browns and Green Bay Packers. The Steelers also struggled with playing in a city and era where baseball was king and were treated as something of a joke compared to the Pirates. The team also made some questionable personnel calls at the time such as cutting a then-unknown Johnny Unitas in training camp (Unitas would go on to a Hall of Fame career with the Baltimore Colts) and trading their first round pick in the 1965 draft to the Chicago Bears (who would draft Dick Butkus with the pick), among others.

Nevertheless, Rooney was popular with owners as a mediator, which would carry over to his son Dan Rooney. He was the only owner to vote against moving the rights of the New York Yanks to Dallas, Texas after the 1951 season due to concerns of racism in the South at the time. (Ultimately, the Dallas Texans failed after one year, and the rights were moved to Baltimore, where the team became the Baltimore Colts. The team now plays in Indianapolis.) In 1963, along with Bears owner George Halas, Rooney was one of two owners to vote for the 1925 NFL Championship to be reinstated to the long-defunct Pottsville Maroons.

The Steelers struggled post-World War II. Between 1950 and 1959, the Steelers posted a record of 49–63–3 with just a single winning season in 1958 where they missed the postseason. The team also struggled with finding a consistent head coach with the longest tenured of that decade being Buddy Parker from 1957 until 1964 with four coaching hires being made in that decade alone. Rooney's struggles to find a long term solution at head coach ended with the hiring of Chuck Noll on January 27, 1969. The hiring of Noll prompted a tradition of long term coaches, with Noll remaining with the team until 1991.

Throughout the 1960's, Rooney's involvement in the organization waned. By 1969, he relinquished his position of managing day-to-day operations, handing the role to his son, Dan M. Rooney. From 1969 until his death in 1988, Rooney acted as the team's chairman and President Emeritus. In 1972, they began an 8–year run of playoff appearances, and 13 straight years of winning seasons, including three additional playoff berths. Following the AFL–NFL merger in 1970, the Steelers agreed to leave the NFL Eastern Conference and joined the AFC Central Division.

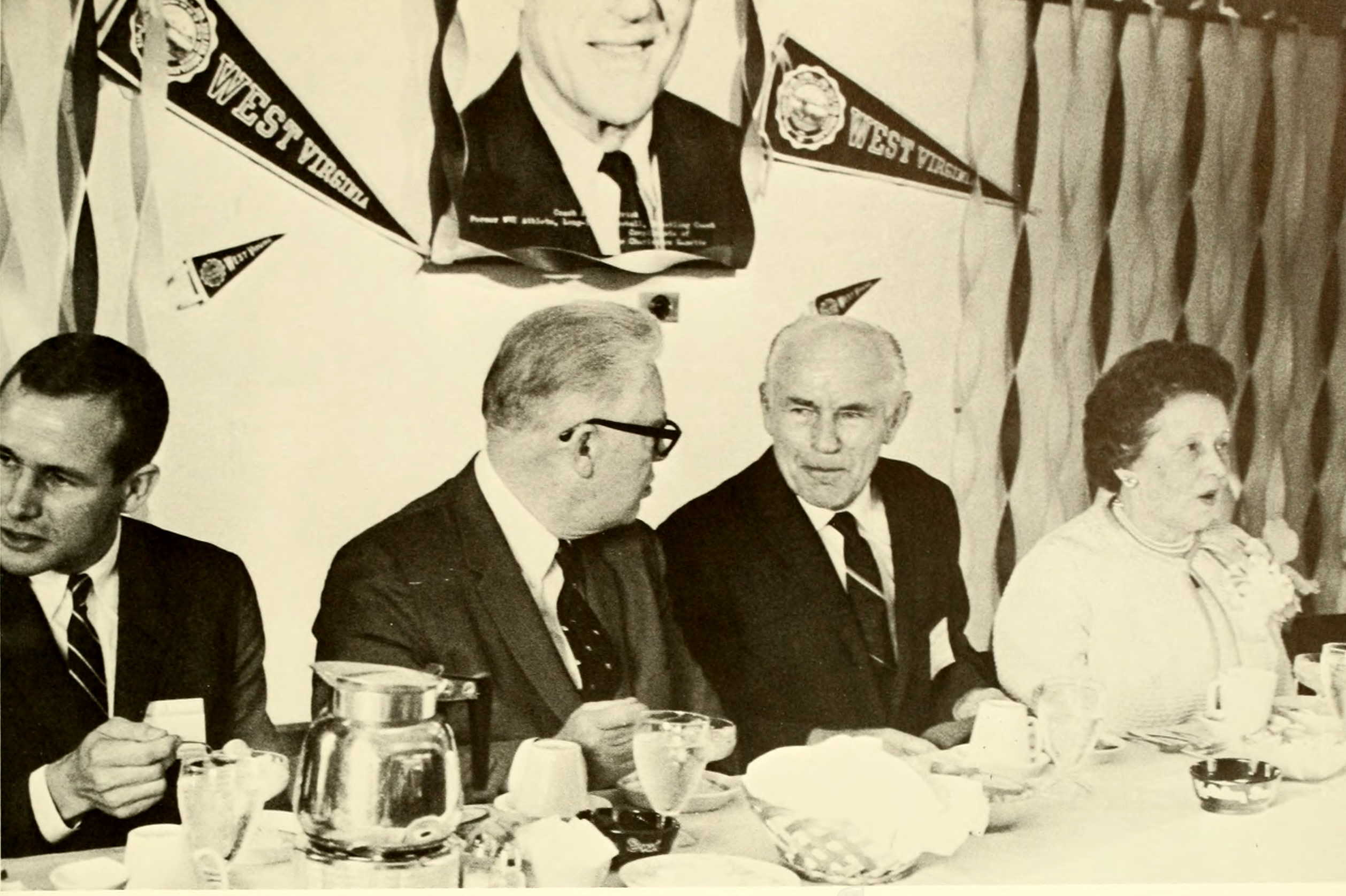
Rooney (second from left) during a luncheon at West Virginia University in 1962

In Rooney's 41st season as owner, the club won their first Super Bowl. He oversaw the team subsequently win three more (X, XIII and XIV).

Rooney was a vocal man and while he did not directly make decisions for the team from 1969 until 1988, he still had a say in team transactions including coaching hires and draft selections. In 1983, Rooney as well as his son, Dan, pushed for the Steelers to draft Dan Marino, a prospect out of the University of Pittsburgh, to replace an aging Terry Bradshaw. Though not the team's general manager, Chuck Noll ultimately made the final decision to pass on Marino. Noll cited a rumor about Marino's partying antics at Pitt being his reasoning for passing on the prospect and instead decided to select Gabe Rivera, a defensive tackle from Texas Tech. Marino went on to be drafted by the Miami Dolphins and lead them to a Super Bowl in 1984 while also winning several awards including the Walter Payton Man of the Year and being named to the Pro Bowl several times. Meanwhile in Pittsburgh, Rivera only played in six professional games before being paralyzed in a drunk driving crash. Rooney expressed regret at the team's decision to pass on Marino, telling his sons Dan and Art Rooney, Jr. that he "never forgave" them for not drafting him. This regret stuck with Dan who later cited the decision to not draft Marino and his father's disappointment as one of the reasons he was keen on drafting Ben Roethlisberger in the 2004 NFL draft.

== Pittsburgh Penguins ==
As a pillar of the community in many aspects, Rooney was asked to lend his considerable influence in the city's bid to reclaim an NHL franchise during the league's expansion in 1967. Although Pittsburgh enjoyed championship hockey with the professional but "minor league" Pittsburgh Hornets since its NHL franchise (the Pirates hockey team) disbanded in 1930 from the effects of the Great Depression, many city leaders were pushing for the region to become more "major league" suggesting that Mr. Rooney use his influence in the sports industry to have the league award Pittsburgh a franchise. Rooney proved his worth and from 1967 until the early 1970s was a part owner of the Pittsburgh Penguins.

== Homestead Grays ==
In a 1981 interview by the Pittsburgh Press Rooney related that "from time to time he had helped financially support the Negro league team, the Homestead Grays, and . . . was a better baseball fan than football fan."

== Track sports ==
Rooney also acquired the Yonkers Raceway in 1972, the Palm Beach Kennel Club, Green Mountain Kennel Club in Vermont, Shamrock Stables in Maryland and owned the Liberty Bell Park Racetrack outside Philadelphia.

== Death ==
I'll never forget the way he introduced me, 'This is Ralph Giampaolo, a member of our organization.' Not a member of our ground crew. Not some rinky-dink bum. But a member of 'our organization'. As far as [Curt] Gowdy knew, I was vice president of the team. Mr. Rooney made me feel 10 feet tall.

— Inviting a groundskeeper up to the owner's box for dinner.

On August 25, 1988, Rooney died of complications from a stroke at the age of 87. An August 1987 Pittsburgh Press story stated that Rooney never missed a Hall of Fame induction ceremony in all 25 years, and that he was asked to present his third inductee, John Henry Johnson, that month.

In memory of "the Chief," Steelers wore a patch on the left shoulder of their uniforms with Rooney's initials AJR for the entire season. The team ended up finishing 5–11, their worst record since a 1–13 showing in 1969. He is buried at the North Side Catholic Cemetery in Pittsburgh.

== Legacy ==
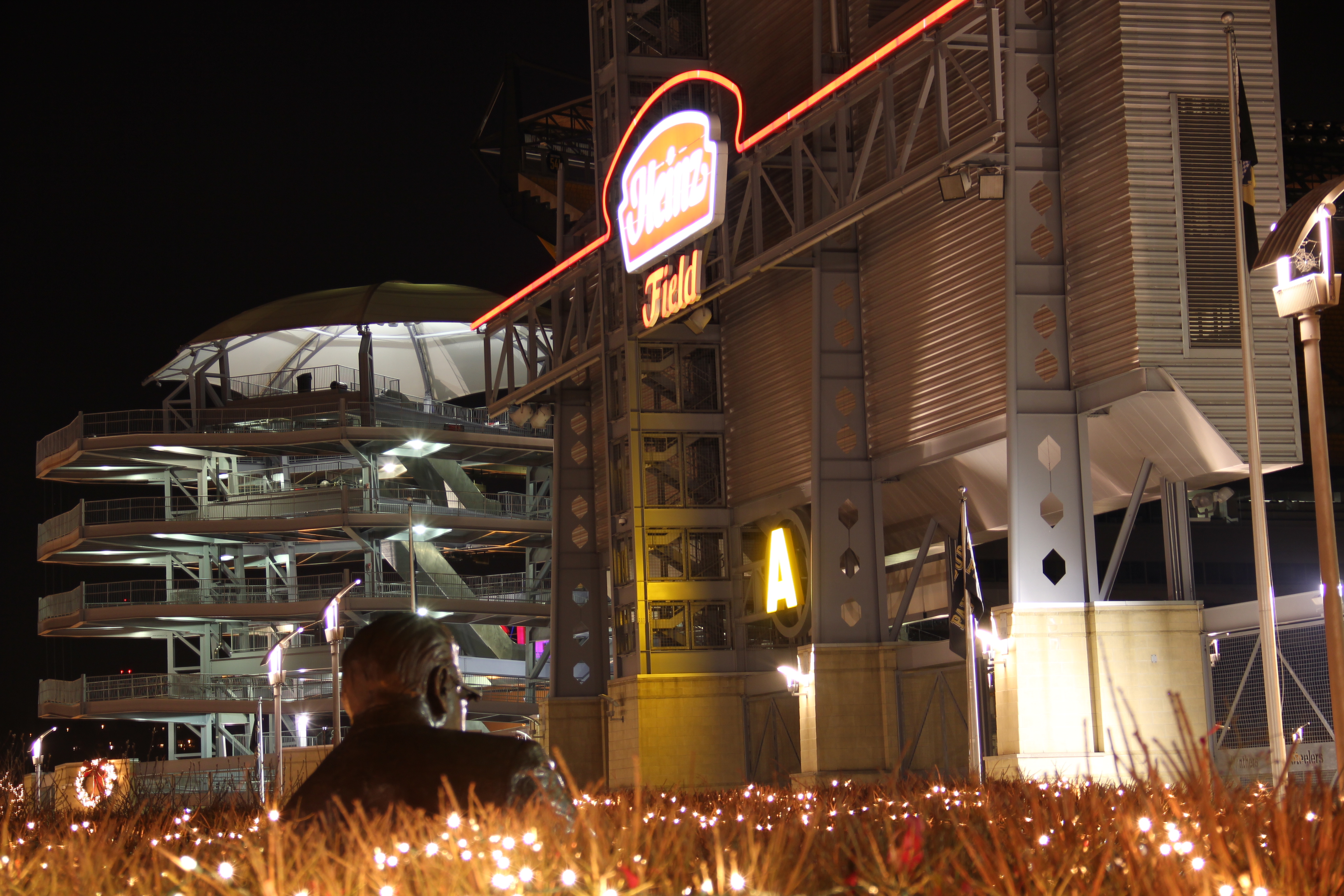
Statue of Rooney in the foreground looking out to Heinz Field

In 1964, he was elected to the Pro Football Hall of Fame. Duquesne University named their football field in his honor in 1993. In 1999 Rooney ranked 81st on the Sporting News' "100 Most Powerful Sports Figures of the 20th Century" list. A statue of his likeness graces the entrance to the home of the Pittsburgh Steelers, Heinz Field. The street that runs adjacent to Heinz Field on Pittsburgh's North Side is named "Art Rooney Avenue" in his honor. In 2000, he was inducted as a "pioneer" into the American Football Association's Semi-Pro Football Hall of Fame.

During Rooney's life, the Steelers would often use a late-round draft pick on a player from a local college like Pitt, West Virginia or Penn State. Though these players rarely made the team, this practice was intended to appeal to local fans and players.

Art Rooney is the finest person I've ever known.

— U.S. Supreme Court Justice Byron White.

[The] most popular sports figure in history.

— Art Modell.

Art Rooney is the subject of, and the only character in, the one-man play The Chief, written by Gene Collier and Rob Zellers.

Art Rooney's North Side Golden Rule

My father always used to tell us boys, "Treat everybody the way you'd like to be treated. Give them the benefit of the doubt. But never let anyone mistake kindness for weakness." He took the Golden Rule and put a little bit of the North Side in it.

— Art Rooney Jr. on his father

Arthur J. Rooney was married to Kathleen Rooney née McNulty (1904–1982) for 51 years, until her 1982 death. Kathleen was the mother of Art's five sons, who are Dan Rooney, former chairman of the board of directors of the Pittsburgh Steelers and a former United States Ambassador to Ireland, Art Rooney Jr., Timothy Rooney, Patrick Rooney, and John Rooney (all also directors of the Pittsburgh Steelers). She is also the grandmother of the couple's 32 grandchildren, including current Steelers president Art Rooney II and U.S. Representative Thomas J. Rooney (R, FL-16). The couple also has about 75 great-grandchildren, including actress sisters Kate Mara and Rooney Mara.
