= 1937 Washington Redskins season =

NFL team season

- Owner: George Preston Marshall
- General manager: Jack Espey
- Head coach: Ray Flaherty
- Home stadium: Griffith Stadium

Results
- Record: 8–3
- Division place: 1st NFL Eastern
- Playoffs: Won NFL Championship (at Bears) 28–21

The 1937 Washington Redskins season was the franchise's 6th season in the National Football League (NFL) and their first in Washington, D.C. The Boston Redskins moved to Washington after their runner-up 1936 season and became the Washington Redskins. In 1937 they repeated as Eastern Division champions and played the NFL championship game on the road against the Chicago Bears at Wrigley Field. The Redskins won the championship game, 28–21.

The Boston Redskins had won the Eastern Division title the previous season, but had poor attendance, prompting the owner George Preston Marshall to move south to his hometown. The Redskins selected quarterback Sammy Baugh from TCU in the first round of the 1937 NFL draft, on December 12, 1936, while still in Boston. Rookie Baugh led the league in passing in 1937 with a then-record 81 pass completions, and halfback Cliff Battles led the NFL in rushing with 874 yards.

The Redskins were the first team to relocate and win a championship in their first year.

== Draft ==
1937 Washington Redskins draft
Round	Pick	Player	Position	College	Notes
1	6	Sammy Baugh * ^{†}	Quarterback	TCU	
2	16	Nello Falaschi *	Center	Santa Clara	
3	26	Maurice Elder	Back	Kansas State	
4	36	Dick Bassi *	Guard	Santa Clara	
5	46	Chuck Bond	Tackle	Washington	
6	56	Jimmie Cain	Back	Washington	
7	66	Rotta Holland	Guard	Kansas State	
8	76	Joel Eaves	End	Auburn	
9	86	Bill Docherty	Tackle	Temple	
10	96	Mac Cara	End	NC State	
Made roster † Pro Football Hall of Fame * Made at least one Pro Bowl during career

== Preseason ==
In the 1937 NFL draft, the Redskins selected Sammy Baugh with the sixth overall pick. Baugh went on to play sixteen years with the Redskins, retiring after the 1952 season; he was named to the NFL 1940s All-Decade Team and the Pro Football Hall of Fame. On September 6, 1937, the Redskins played their first Washington-area game following their move from Boston. Washington beat an American Legion All-Star team by a score of 50–0 in front of 1,000 at McCurdy Field in Frederick, Maryland.

== Regular season ==
=== Schedule ===
Week	Date	Opponent	Result	Record	Venue	Attendance	Recap
1	Bye						
2	Bye						
3	September 16	**New York Giants**	**W** 13–3	1–0	Griffith Stadium	25,000	Recap
4	September 24	Chicago Cardinals	**L** 14–21	1–1	Griffith Stadium	22,367	Recap
5	October 3	**Brooklyn Dodgers**	**W** 11–7	2–1	Griffith Stadium	16,000	Recap
6	October 10	**Philadelphia Eagles**	**L** 0–14	2–2	Griffith Stadium	7,320	Recap
7	October 17	**Pittsburgh Pirates**	**W** 34–20	3–2	Griffith Stadium	12,835	Recap
8	October 24	at **Philadelphia Eagles**	**W** 10–7	4–2	Philadelphia Municipal Stadium	13,167	Recap
9	October 31	at **Brooklyn Dodgers**	**W** 21–0	5–2	Ebbets Field	22,500	Recap
10	Bye						
11	November 14	at **Pittsburgh Pirates**	**L** 13–21	5–3	Forbes Field	12,242	Recap
12	November 21	at Cleveland Rams	**W** 16–7	6–3	Cleveland Stadium	3,500	Recap
13	November 28	Green Bay Packers	**W** 14–6	7–3	Griffith Stadium	30,000	Recap
14	December 5	at **New York Giants**	**W** 49–14	8–3	Polo Grounds	58,285	Recap
Note: Intra-division opponents are in **bold** text.

=== Playoffs ===
Round	Date	Opponent	Result	Venue	Attendance	Game recap
Championship	December 12	at Chicago Bears	**W** 28–21	Wrigley Field	15,878	Recap

== Standings ==
NFL Eastern Division
	W	L	T	PCT	DIV	PF	PA	STK
Washington Redskins	8	3	0	.727	6–2	195	120	W2
New York Giants	6	3	2	.667	5–2–1	128	109	L1
Pittsburgh Pirates	4	7	0	.364	4–4	122	145	L1
Brooklyn Dodgers	3	7	1	.300	2–5–1	82	174	T1
Philadelphia Eagles	2	8	1	.200	2–6	86	177	L1

Note: Tie games were not officially counted in the standings until 1972.

== Roster ==
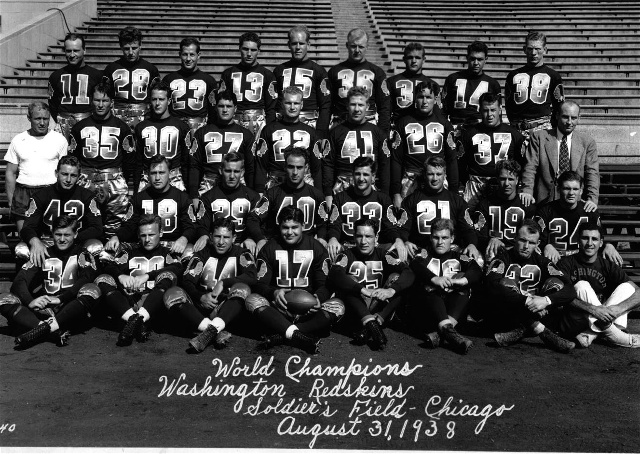

1937 Washington Redskins final roster
Backs: 20 Cliff Battles RB/CB; 33 Sammy Baugh RB/CB; 12 Eddie Britt FB/LB; 30 Dixie Howell RB/CB; 23 Don Irwin FB/LB; 13 Ed Justice RB/CB; 25 Max Krause FB/LB; 11 Erny Pinckert RB/CB; 35 Riley Smith RB/S/K	Linemen/Linebackers: 15 Jim Barber T/DT; 22 Chuck Bond T/DT; 26 Vic Carroll G/T/DG/DT; 17 Turk Edwards T/DT; 43 Eddie Kahn G/DG; 29 Jim Karcher G/DG; 39 Ed Kawal C/LB; 41 Henry Krause C/LB; 18 Eddie Michaels G/DG; 21 Les Olsson G/DG; 47 George Smith C/LB; 37 Bill Young T/DT	Ends/Receivers: 19 Charley Malone; 32 Bob McChesney; 40 Wayne Millner; 38 Ben Smith; Reserve: Frank Walton G/DG (inactive); rookies in italics
