= Ray Flaherty =

American football player and coach (1903–1994)

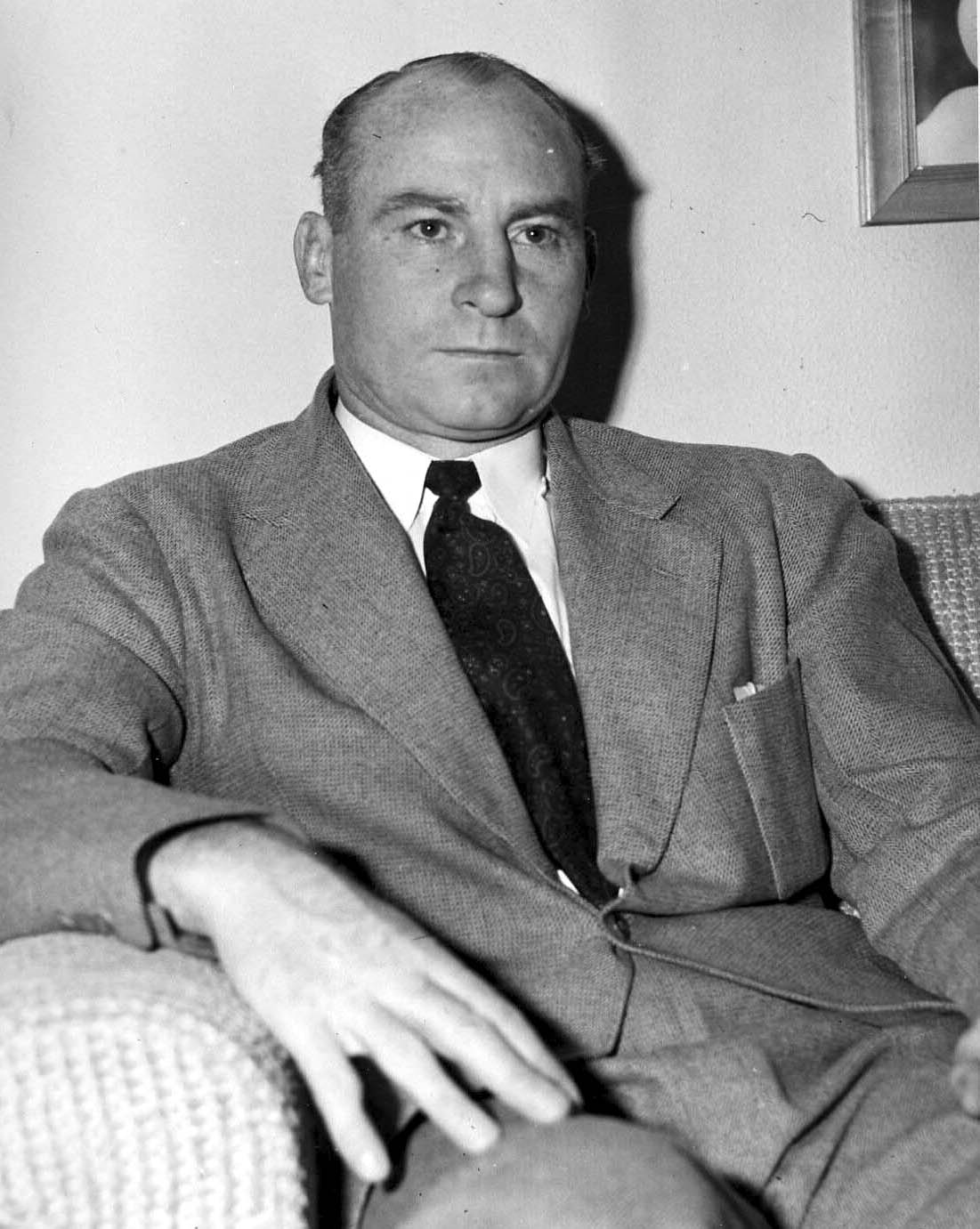
- Flaherty c. 1940s

No. 20, 11, 17, 6, 1
- Position: End

Personal information
- Born: September 1, 1903; Lamont, Washington, U.S.
- Died: July 19, 1994 (aged 90); Coeur d'Alene, Idaho, U.S.
- Listed height: 6 ft 0 in (1.83 m)
- Listed weight: 190 lb (86 kg)

Career information
- High school: Gonzaga (Spokane, Washington)
- College: Washington State (1922); Gonzaga (1923–1925)

Career history

Playing
- Los Angeles Wildcats (1926); New York Yankees (1927–1928); New York Giants (1929; 1931–1935)

Coaching
- Gonzaga (1930) Head coach; Boston / Washington Redskins (1936–1942) Head coach; New York Yankees (1946–1948) Head coach; Chicago Hornets (1949) Head coach

Awards and highlights
- As a player: NFL champion (1934); 7× First-team All-Pro (1926–1929, 1932–1934); Third-team All-Pro (1931); NFL receptions leader (1932); NFL receiving yards leader (1932); NFL receiving touchdowns leader (1932); New York Giants No. 1 retired; 50th greatest New York Giant of all-time; As a coach: 2× NFL champion (1937, 1942); Washington Commanders 90 Greatest

Career statistics
- Receptions: 41
- Receiving yards: 626
- Receiving touchdowns: 20
- Stats at Pro Football Reference

Head coaching record
- Regular season: College: 1–7–1 (.167); NFL: 54–21–5 (.706); AAFC: 26–16–2 (.614); Total: 81–44–8 (.639)
- Postseason: NFL: 2–2 (.500); AAFC: 2–4 (.333); Total: 4–6 (.400)
- Career: College: 1–7–1 (.167); NFL: 56–23–5 (.696); AAFC: 28–20–2 (.580); Total: 85–50–8 (.622)
- Coaching profile at Pro Football Reference
- Pro Football Hall of Fame

Raymond Paul Flaherty (September 1, 1903 – July 19, 1994) was an American professional football player and coach who spent 18 total seasons in the National Football League (NFL) as both a player and a coach. He played college football for the Gonzaga Bulldogs and played for the Los Angeles Wildcats of the American Football League (AFL) and the New York Yankees and New York Giants of the NFL. The Giants retired his jersey number 1, the first in NFL history, upon his playing retirement in 1935.

Flaherty was head coach of Gonzaga's football and basketball teams in 1930 and 1931, the NFL's Washington Redskins from 1936 to 1942, and the New York Yankees and Chicago Hornets of the All-America Football Conference (AAFC) in the latter half of the 1940s. He was a member of three NFL championship teams, one with the Giants in 1934 and two as Redskins head coach in 1937 and 1942, and was inducted into the Pro Football Hall of Fame in 1976.

== Early life ==
Born on a farm near Lamont in eastern Washington, Flaherty grew up in Spokane and was a multi-sport athlete at Gonzaga High School (now Gonzaga Prep) and Gonzaga University, where he played with Hust Stockton under head coach Gus Dorais. As a freshman, Flaherty attended Washington State College in Pullman, then transferred to Gonzaga before his sophomore year. Flaherty competed on the Gonzaga Bulldogs track and field, baseball, and basketball teams in addition to playing football.

== Professional career ==
Flaherty began his professional football career in 1926 with the Los Angeles Wildcats of the American Football League, a team of western players based in Illinois. It played all its games on the road in its only season, which ended with a post-season barnstorming tour through the South against league rival New York Yankees. Flaherty then played in the National Football League (NFL) for eight seasons, first with the Yankees (1927–1928) with Red Grange, until the franchise folded following the 1928 season. He joined the New York Giants, 1929 through the 1935 season, except for 1930, when he returned to Spokane as the head coach at his alma mater, Gonzaga. He also coached the Bulldog basketball team for a season (1930–1931). At the end of the 1935 season, Flaherty's jersey number 1 was 'taken out of circulation', thus making Flaherty the first professional football player to have his number retired. In 2024, wide receiver Malik Nabers was given permission by Flaherty's family to wear the number. In 1930, Flaherty played minor league baseball as a second baseman with the Providence Grays of the Eastern League.

== Head coaching career ==
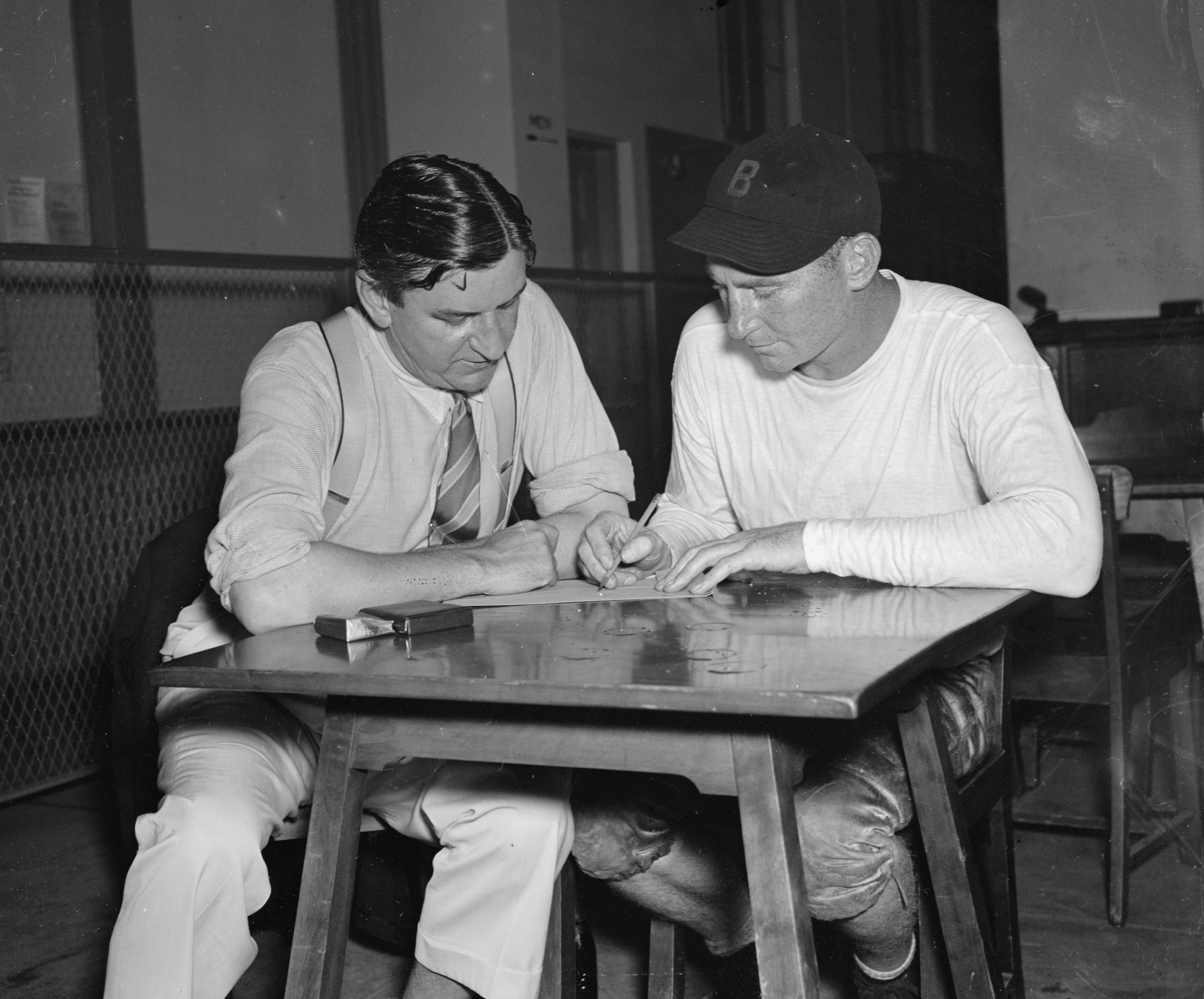
Flaherty (right) as Washington Redskins head coach meeting with team owner George Preston Marshall, 1937

Following his playing career, Flaherty was hired by George Preston Marshall, owner of the NFL's Boston Redskins, as head coach for the 1936 season. The team won the division title that year, then relocated to Washington, D.C. for the 1937 season, and picked up future hall of fame quarterback Sammy Baugh in the first round of the 1937 NFL draft. In seven seasons at the helm of the Redskins, Flaherty won four division titles (1936, 1937, 1940, 1942) and two NFL Championships (1937, 1942). Among his innovations on offense, Flaherty is credited with inventing the screen pass in 1937.

The Redskins held their 1940 training camp in Spokane at Gonzaga; the previous year's camp was also held in Spokane County, at Eastern Washington College in Cheney. In 1941 and 1942, the Redskins trained in California in San Diego at Brown Military Academy.

Flaherty served as an officer in the U.S. Navy during World War II, then returned to pro football in 1946 as a head coach in the new All-America Football Conference (AAFC). With the New York Yankees, he won division titles in each of his two full seasons at the helm, but lost to the Cleveland Browns in the title games. After a poor start in 1948, owner Dan Topping relieved Flaherty of his duties in mid-September. Several months later he was hired as head coach of the AAFC's Chicago Hornets, known as the Rockets in their three previous seasons. He was inducted into the Pro Football Hall of Fame in 1976 for his contributions as a coach.

== After football ==
After the end of the AAFC in 1949, Flaherty returned to the Spokane area to enter private business as a beverage distributor, and lived in nearby northern Idaho. During football season, he was a part-time columnist for the Spokane Daily Chronicle. A college friend of Bing Crosby, Flaherty participated in the singer's Spokane memorial service in 1977.

After an extended illness at the age of 90, Flaherty died on July 19, 1994, in Hayden, Idaho.

== Head coaching record ==
=== College ===
Year	Team	Overall	Conference	Standing	Bowl/playoffs
Gonzaga Bulldogs (Independent) (1930)
1930	Gonzaga	1–7–1			
Gonzaga:		1–7–1			
Total:		1–7–1			

=== Professional ===
Team	Year	Regular season					Postseason			
Team	Year	Won	Lost	Ties	Win %	Finish	Won	Lost	Win %	Result
BOS	1936	7	5	0	.583	1st in Eastern Division	0	1	.000	Lost NFL Championship to Green Bay Packers
WAS	1937	8	3	0	.727	1st in Eastern Division	1	0	1.000	Won NFL Championship over Chicago Bears
WAS	1938	6	3	2	.667	2nd in Eastern Division	-	-	-	-
WAS	1939	8	2	1	.800	2nd in Eastern Division	-	-	-	-
WAS	1940	9	2	0	.818	1st in Eastern Division	0	1	.000	Lost NFL Championship to Chicago Bears
WAS	1941	6	5	0	.545	3rd in Eastern Division	-	-	-	-
WAS	1942	10	1	0	.909	1st in Eastern Division	1	0	1.000	Won NFL Championship over Chicago Bears
WAS/NFL total		54	21	5	72.0		2	2	.500	
NYY	1946	10	3	1	.769	1st in Eastern Division	0	1	.000	Lost AAFC Championship Game to Cleveland Browns
NYY	1947	11	2	1	.846	1st in Eastern Division	0	1	.000	Lost AAFC Championship Game to Cleveland Browns
NYY	1948	1	3	0	.250	fired in mid-season	-	-	-	-
NYY AAFC total		22	8	2	.733		0	2	.000	
CHI	1949	4	8	0	.333	4th in AAFC	-	-	-	-
CHI AAFC total		4	8	0	.333		-	-	-	-
AAFC total		26	16	2	.619		0	2	.000	-
Professional total		80	37	5	.684		2	4	.333	
Source: Pro-Football-Reference.com

== See also ==
- History of the New York Giants (1925–1978)
