= Ray Buivid =

American football player (1915–1972)

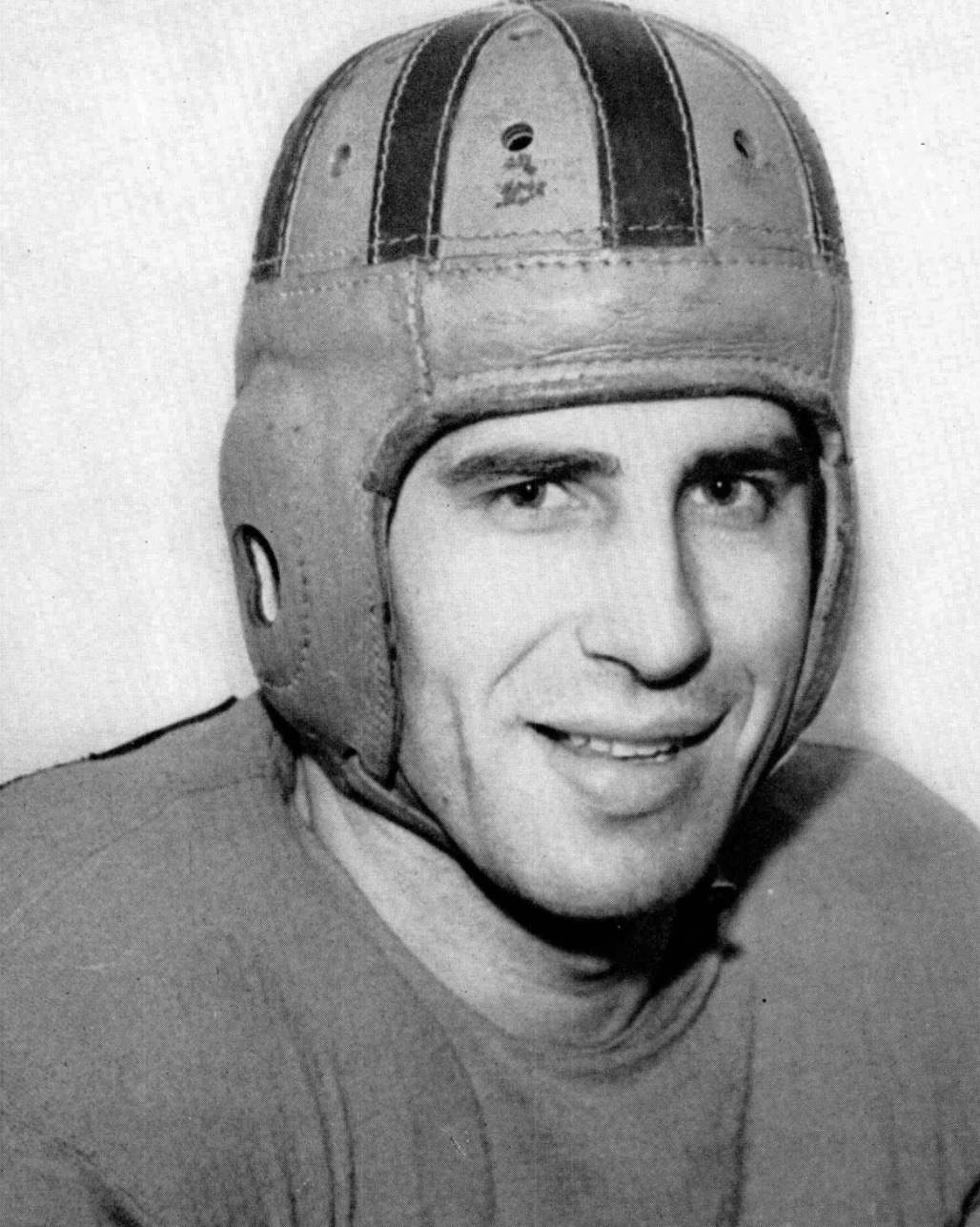
- Buivid from the 1937 Hilltop

No. 9
- Positions: Quarterback, halfback

Personal information
- Born: August 15, 1915; Sheboygan, Wisconsin, U.S.
- Died: July 5, 1972 (aged 56); Cherry Hill, New Jersey, U.S.
- Listed height: 6 ft 1 in (1.85 m)
- Listed weight: 195 lb (88 kg)

Career information
- High school: Port Washington (WI)
- College: Marquette
- NFL draft: 1937: 1st round, 3rd overall pick

Career history
- New York Yankees (1937); Chicago Bears (1937–1938)

Awards and highlights
- First quarterback to throw five touchdowns in a game in NFL; Consensus All-American (1936); Third-team All-American (1935); Third in Heisman Trophy voting (1936)

Career NFL statistics
- Passing attempts: 83
- Passing completions: 34
- Completion percentage: 41.0%
- TD–INT: 11-4
- Passing yards: 500
- Passer rating: 80.8
- Rushing yards: 89
- Stats at Pro Football Reference

Raymond Vincent Buivid (August 15, 1915 – July 5, 1972) was an American professional football player who played quarterback in the National Football League (NFL) for the Chicago Bears. He was nicknamed "Buzz".

A versatile player, Buivid played quarterback, halfback, and defensive back for the Marquette Golden Avalanche football team. He threw 13 touchdowns his junior year (1935). In 1936, he finished third in the voting for the Heisman Trophy. He was a consensus All-American as a halfback, though he completed over 50% of his passes as quarterback as well. Marquette finished 20th in the country, and played in their first ever bowl game, the first Cotton Bowl Classic. They lost 16–6 to TCU led by Sammy Baugh.

Buivid was drafted in the first round with the third overall pick in the 1937 NFL Draft. He is the highest drafted player out of Marquette. Buivid signed with the Chicago Bears on October 11, 1937, after missing the first three games of the season. In the season finale against the cross-town rival Chicago Cardinals, he became the first player to throw five touchdowns in a single game, and also caught one. Despite this performance, he appeared in just six games that season, all behind starting quarterback Bernie Masterson, attempting just 35 passes. The 9–1 Bears won the Western division, and played in the 1937 NFL Championship Game against the Washington Redskins, led by fellow rookie Sammy Baugh (who was drafted after Buivid, despite defeating him in the Cotton Bowl). Buivid was just 3 for 12 passing and 3 for -6 yards rushing with three turnovers, including a muffed punt late in the fourth quarter to seal the defeat.

The next season, he appeared in 11 games but attempted just 48 passes for 295 yards, along with 32 rushes for 65 yards. Buivid retired in August 1939 after just two seasons to work as an insurance agent for Bankers Life. His rights were traded to the Brooklyn Dodgers in September for Bob MacLeod.

He was a lieutenant in the United States Navy during World War II. Buivid later worked as a sales executive for General Electric in Camden, New Jersey. He married his wife Janina Celichowski in 1940 and had a daughter Barbara Ann Cady.

Buivid died of a heart attack at his home on July 5, 1972, at the age of 56. He was interred at St. Mary's Cemetery in Bellmawr, New Jersey.

== Career statistics ==
Year	Team	Games		Passing						Rushing			Receiving		
Year	Team	GP	GS	Cmp	Att	Yds	TD	Int	Rtg	Att	Yds	TD	Rec	Yds	TD
1937	CHI	6	0	17	35	205	6	2	82.7	19	24	0	1	4	1
1938	CHI	11	6	17	48	295	5	2	74.6	32	65	0	1	8	0
Career		17	6	34	83	500	11	4	80.8	51	89	0	2	12	1
