= Dixie Howell =

American sports player and coach (1912–1971)

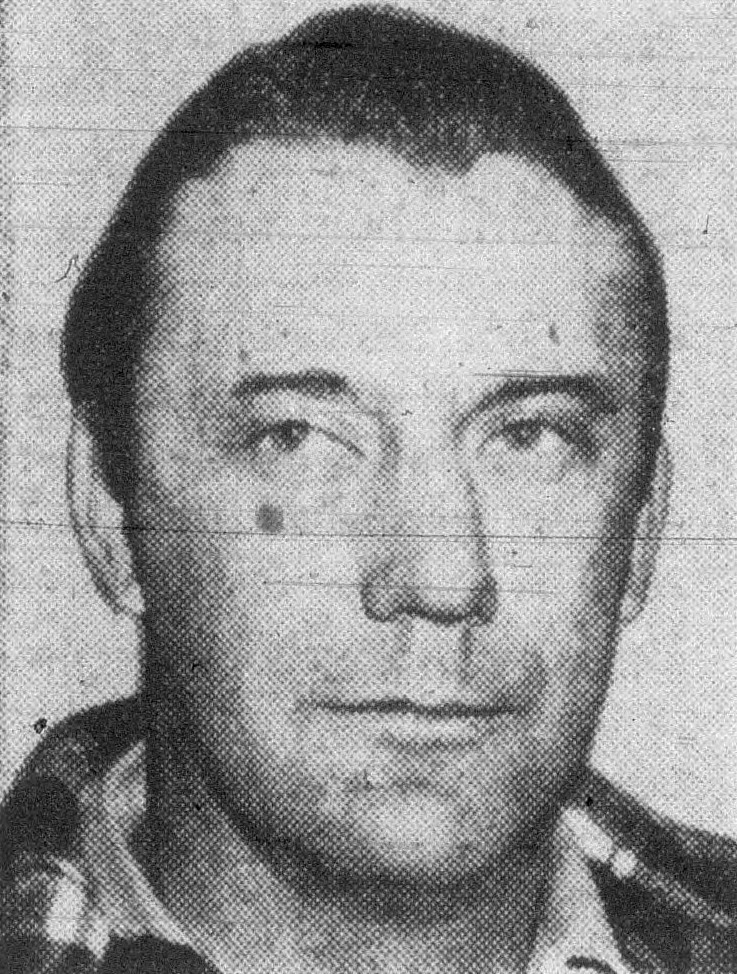
- Howell, circa 1949

Biographical details
- Born: November 24, 1912; Hartford, Alabama, U.S.
- Died: March 2, 1971 (aged 58); Los Angeles, California, U.S.

Playing career

Football
- 1932–1934: Alabama
- 1937: Washington Redskins

Baseball
- 1933–1935: Alabama
- 1935–1942: minor leagues
- Position: Halfback (football)

Coaching career (HC unless noted)

Football
- 1935: UNAM
- 1936: Loyola (LA) (backs)
- 1938–1941: Arizona State
- 1946: Alabama (backs)
- 1947–1950: Idaho
- late 1950s: Furman (assistant)

Baseball
- 1946: Alabama
- 1958–1960: Furman

Head coaching record
- Overall: 36–35–5 (college football); 42–40–1 (college baseball)
- Bowls: 0–1–1

Accomplishments and honors

Championships
- NFL champion (1937); 2 Border (1939, 1940); Liga Mayor (1935)

Awards
- Consensus All-American (1934); SEC Player of the Year (1934); 2× First-team All-SEC (1933, 1934)
- College Football Hall of Fame; Inducted in 1970 (profile)
- Military career
- Allegiance: United States
- Branch: United States Navy
- Service years: 1942–1945
- Rank: Lieutenant Commander
- Unit: Training
- Conflicts: World War II

Millard Fleming "Dixie" Howell (November 24, 1912 – March 2, 1971) was an American football and baseball player and coach. He played college football as a halfback at the University of Alabama from 1932 to 1934 and with the Washington Redskins of the National Football League (NFL) in 1937. Howell served as the head football coach at Arizona State Teachers College at Tempe, now Arizona State University, from 1938 to 1941 and at the University of Idaho from 1947 to 1950, compiling a career coaching record of 36–35–5 in college football. He also coached at the National Autonomous University of Mexico in 1935. Howell was inducted into the College Football Hall of Fame as a player in 1970. He also played professional baseball in eight minor league seasons following college.

== Playing career ==
=== Football ===
Born in Hartford, Alabama, Howell graduated from Geneva County High School in Hartford and played college football as an undersized (160 lb (73 kg)) quadruple-threat back at Alabama from 1932 to 1934. As a senior, the Crimson Tide ran the Notre Dame Box offense, and he was a consensus All-American in 1934, as well as one of the nation's top punters. The 1934 Alabama team had two future legends as ends: Don Hutson and Bear Bryant. The Crimson Tide posted a 10–0 record, and defeated previously unbeaten Stanford 29-13 in the Rose Bowl on New Year's Day, 1935. Howell threw two touchdown passes to Hutson and ran for two more; he is a member of the all-time Rose Bowl team.

In 1937, Howell briefly played professional football in the National Football League (NFL) for the Washington Redskins, who had just relocated from Boston. The Redskins had lost the NFL championship game in 1936 to Green Bay, but returned to the title game in 1937 and defeated the Chicago Bears at Wrigley Field. Howell was a reserve quarterback for the Redskins, behind starter Sammy Baugh. He became a collegiate head coach in 1938 and ended his football playing career.

=== Baseball ===
Howell also played baseball for the Crimson Tide and originally indicated he would finish out the college baseball season in 1935 and turn pro that June. Plans changed and he signed a professional baseball contract with the Detroit Tigers in early March and played minor league baseball through 1942.

A month after signing, he was hospitalized after being struck in the head by a foul line drive; it occurred during batting practice before an April exhibition game in Virginia, off the bat of Johnny Mize. In 1936 he played with Portland in the Pacific Coast League, then was moved to Toledo in the American Association. His career tailed off and he spent the rest of his baseball career in lower leagues. After service in the U.S. Navy during World War II, he did not return as a player and became the head coach at Alabama in January 1946 and resigned in March 1947 to become head football coach at Idaho.

== Coaching career ==
While pursuing his baseball career, Howell coached football in his autumn off-seasons; leading the National Autonomous University of Mexico to a Liga Mayor national championship in 1935 and serving as an assistant at Loyola University New Orleans in 1936.

Following a season in the NFL in 1937, he was hired as head coach at the Arizona State Teachers College in Tempe, and stayed for four seasons (1938–1941) with the Bulldogs, with two conference titles and two appearances in the Sun Bowl. He was a finalist for the open job at Idaho in 1941 to succeed Ted Bank, which went to Francis Schmidt, then resigned his position at Tempe in the spring of 1942 and joined the U.S. Navy as a physical training instructor for naval aviators. He served until his discharge as a lieutenant commander in November 1945, then returned to Tuscaloosa in January 1946 as an assistant football coach (backs) and head baseball coach for the Crimson Tide.

Howell was hired as head football coach at Idaho of the Pacific Coast Conference in February 1947, and guided the usually-struggling Vandals to a promising 4–4 record in his first season in Moscow, Idaho's best since 1938. The Vandals beat Stanford on the road, a team that had defeated them 45–0 the previous year (but went winless in 1947). It was Idaho's second-ever football victory over a PCC team from California, following a victory over first-year UCLA in 1928. The Vandals also knocked off an undefeated Utah in the season finale in Boise. The Vandals drew a Palouse and state record crowd to Neale Stadium for their annual rivalry game with Washington State in October, albeit a close 7–0 loss to the Cougars. These promising factors earned Howell a two-year contract extension through 1950. The progress did not continue, as the Vandals opened the 1948 season with four losses and went 3–6 overall and 1–5 in conference, defeating only Montana for the Little Brown Stein. Idaho played Washington State close at Rogers Field in Pullman and gave Oregon a scare in Moscow. The Ducks, with Norm Van Brocklin and John McKay, went 7–0 in conference and were co-champions with California.

Howell's relationship with Idaho fans and the administration was strained following the 1949 season. The Vandals went 3–5 and 1–4 in conference that season, defeating only departing Montana again. Their two non-conference wins were against overmatched opponents Willamette and Portland, and the Vandals were severely outscored 230–45 in their five losses, capped by a 63–0 loss at Stanford to end the season. Howell felt compelled to publicly deny rumors in April that he would leave before the 1950 season.

The Vandals posted a 3–5–1 record in 1950 and 1–1–1 in conference, and Howell's contract was not renewed in March 1951. Assistant coach Babe Curfman succeeded him, after leading the team through its spring drills on an interim basis.

While Howell was the head coach, the Idaho Vandals wore red jerseys.

== In media ==
Howell had an uncredited role in the 1936 movie, The Adventures of Frank Merriwell as a football player. In the book To Kill a Mockingbird chapter 11, Scout, in an attempt to cheer up her brother, tells him he resembles Dixie Howell.

Howell is also mentioned in Randy Newman's song "My Daddy Knew Dixie Howell" from the album Good Old Boys.

== After coaching ==
Howell got out of coaching and later worked in the Los Angeles area in sales and public relations. He had two operations for intestinal cancer in 1969 and 1971 and died at Hollywood Presbyterian Hospital in March 1971 at age 58. and was buried in Alabama in his hometown of Hartford. His wife, former actress Peggy Watters Howell (1914–2006), outlived him by 35 years and is buried beside him.

Weeks after his death, Alabama created an award in his name, given to the outstanding player of the annual spring game.

== Head coaching record ==
=== Football ===
Year	Team	Overall	Conference	Standing	Bowl/playoffs
Arizona State Bulldogs (Border Conference) (1938–1941)
1938	Arizona State	3–6	0–5	7th	
1939	Arizona State	8–2–1	5–1	1st	T Sun
1940	Arizona State	7–2–2	4–1–1	1st	L Sun
1941	Arizona State	5–5–1	2–4–1	7th	
Arizona State:		23–15–4	11–11–2		
Idaho Vandals (Pacific Coast Conference) (1947–1950)
1947	Idaho	4–4	1–4	9th	
1948	Idaho	3–6	1–5	9th	
1949	Idaho	3–5	1–4	9th	
1950	Idaho	3–5–1	1–1–1	T–4th	
Idaho:		13–20–1	4–14–1		
Total:		36–35–5			
National championship Conference title Conference division title or championship game berth
