= 1937 NFL draft =

National Football League draft

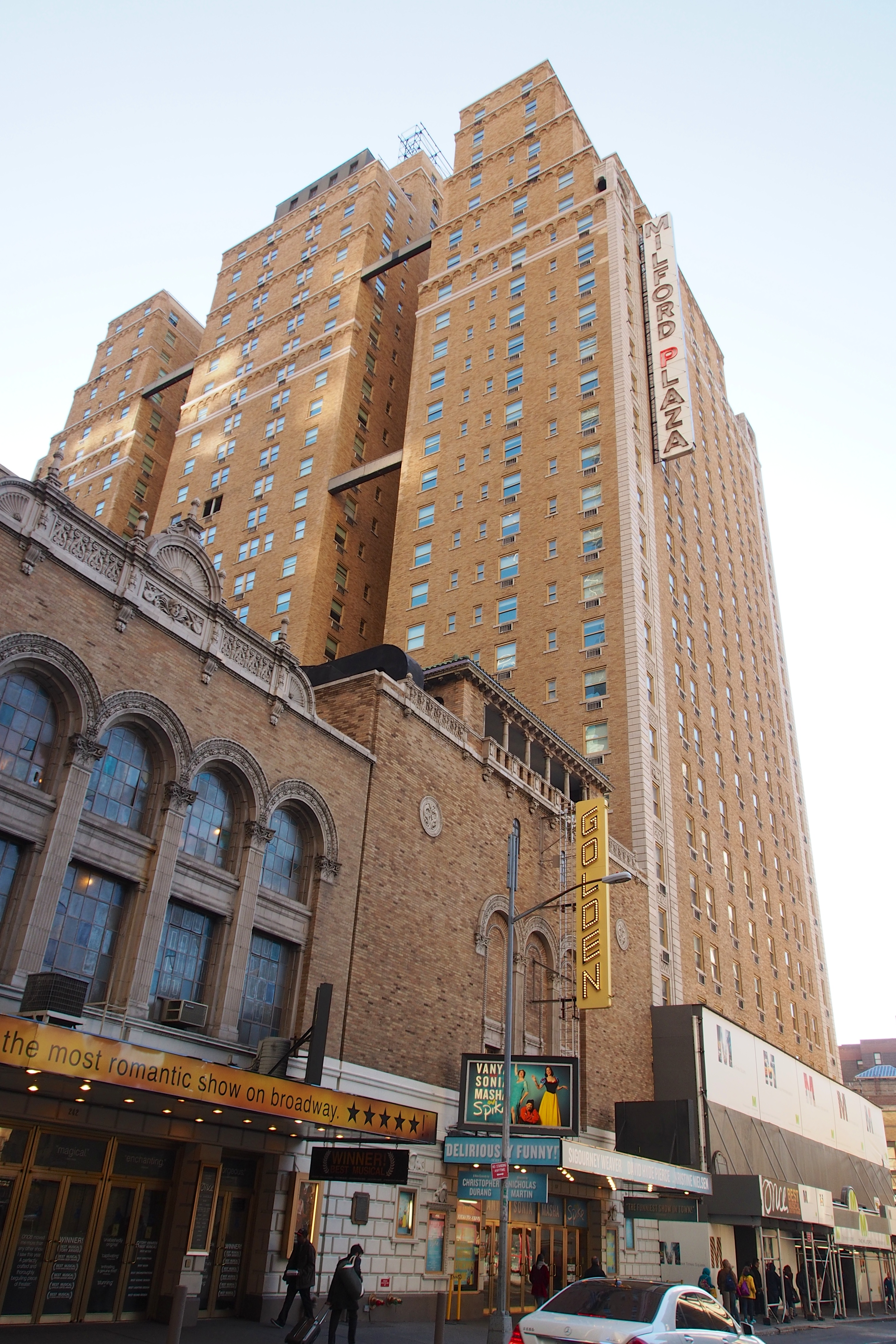
- Building of the former Hotel Lincoln (location of the draft), photographed in 2013

General information
- Date: December 12, 1936
- Location: Hotel Lincoln in New York City

Overview
- 100 total selections in 10 rounds
- League: NFL
- First selection: Sam Francis, RB; Philadelphia Eagles
- Most selections (10): each team selected ten players
- Fewest selections (10): each team selected ten players
- Hall of Famers: 2: QB Sammy Baugh; QB Ace Parker

The 1937 NFL draft was the second draft held by the National Football League (NFL). The draft took place December 12, 1936, at the Hotel Lincoln in New York City. The draft consisted of 10 rounds, with 100 player selections, two of which would later become members of the Professional Football Hall of Fame. Notable for this draft were the league's draft selections for a planned expansion team, the Cleveland Rams, who were admitted into the league prior to the 1937 season. The Philadelphia Eagles used the first overall pick to select back Sam Francis, but ended up trading him to Chicago Bears two months later.

== Player selections ==
‡	= Hall of Famer (Note: Players are identified as a Hall of Famer if they have been inducted into the Pro Football Hall of Fame.)
†	= Pro Bowler (Note: Players are identified as a Pro Bowler if they were selected for the Pro Bowl at any time in their career.)

Positions key
B	Back	BB	Blocking back	C	Center
E	End	FB	Fullback	G	Guard
OT	Offensive tackle	TB	Tailback	WB	Wingback

Rnd.	Pick	Team	Player	Pos.	College	Notes
1	1	Philadelphia Eagles	Sam Francis	B	Nebraska	
1	2	Brooklyn Dodgers	Ed Goddard ^{†}	B	Washington State	
1	3	Chicago Cardinals	Ray Buivid	QB	Marquette	
1	4	New York Giants	Ed Widseth ^{†}	T	Minnesota	
1	5	Pittsburgh Pirates	Mike Basrak	C	Duquesne	
1	6	Washington Redskins	Sammy Baugh^{‡}	QB	TCU	
1	7	Detroit Lions	Lloyd Cardwell ^{†}	B	Nebraska	
1	8	Chicago Bears	Les McDonald	E	Nebraska	
1	9	Green Bay Packers	Eddie Jankowski ^{†}	B	Wisconsin	
1	10	Cleveland Rams	Johnny Drake ^{†}	B	Purdue	
2	11	Philadelphia Eagles	Franny Murray	B	Penn	
2	12	Chicago Cardinals	Gaynell Tinsley ^{†}	E	LSU	
2	13	Brooklyn Dodgers	Ace Parker^{‡}	B	Duke	
2	14	New York Giants	Art White ^{†}	G	Alabama	
2	15	Pittsburgh Pirates	Bob Finley	G	SMU	
2	16	Washington Redskins	Nello Falaschi ^{†}	C	Santa Clara	
2	17	Detroit Lions	Charley Hamrick	T	Ohio State	
2	18	Chicago Bears	Marvin Stewart	B	LSU	
2	19	Green Bay Packers	Ave Daniell	HB	Pittsburgh	
2	20	Cleveland Rams	Jules Alfonse	T	Minnesota	
3	21	Philadelphia Eagles	Drew Ellis	T	TCU	
3	22	Brooklyn Dodgers	Max Starcevich	B	Washington	
3	23	Chicago Cardinals	Arthur Guepe	B	Marquette	
3	24	New York Giants	Jerry Dennerlein	C	St. Mary's (CA)	
3	25	Pittsburgh Pirates	Bill Breeden	E	Oklahoma	
3	26	Washington Redskins	Maurice Elder	B	Kansas State	
3	27	Detroit Lions	Vern Huffman	E	Indiana	
3	28	Chicago Bears	Dick Plasman ^{†}	B	Vanderbilt	
3	29	Green Bay Packers	Bud Wilkinson	E	Minnesota	
3	30	Cleveland Rams	Bobby Larue	T	Pittsburgh	
4	31	Philadelphia Eagles	Walter Gilbert	B	Auburn	
4	32	Chicago Cardinals	Bucky Bryan	G	Tulane	
4	33	Brooklyn Dodgers	Bill Kurlish	T	Penn	
4	34	New York Giants	Ward Cuff ^{†}	E	Marquette	
4	35	Pittsburgh Pirates	Bo Hewes	E	Oklahoma	
4	36	Washington Redskins	Dick Bassi ^{†}	E	Santa Clara	
4	37	Detroit Lions	Bill Glassford	B	Pittsburgh	
4	38	Chicago Bears	Henry Hammond	B	Southwestern (TN)	
4	39	Green Bay Packers	Bud Svendsen ^{†}	E	Minnesota	
5	40	Cleveland Rams	John Wiatrak	C	Washington	
5	41	Philadelphia Eagles	Alex Drobnitch	B	Denver	
5	42	Brooklyn Dodgers	Bert Johnson	T	Kentucky	
5	43	Chicago Cardinals	Ham Harmon	C	Tulsa	
5	44	New York Giants	Mickey Kobrosky	QB	Trinity (CT)	
5	45	Pittsburgh Pirates	Jack Frye	E	Missouri	
5	46	Washington Redskins	Chuck Bond	T	Washington	
5	47	Detroit Lions	Maury Patt	C	Carnegie Tech	
5	48	Chicago Bears	Red Conkright	C	Oklahoma	
5	49	Green Bay Packers	Dewitt Gibson	G	Northwestern	
5	50	Cleveland Rams	Inwood Smith	T	Ohio State	
6	51	Philadelphia Eagles	Bill Guckeyson	B	Maryland	
6	52	Chicago Cardinals	Phil Dickens	T	Tennessee	
6	53	Brooklyn Dodgers	John Golemgeske	T	Wisconsin	
6	54	New York Giants	Jim Farley	B	VMI	
6	55	Pittsburgh Pirates	Walt Roach	B	TCU	
6	56	Washington Redskins	Jimmie Cain	E	Washington	
6	57	Detroit Lions	George Bell	T	Purdue	
6	58	Chicago Bears	Del Bjork ^{†}	B	Oregon	
6	59	Green Bay Packers	Merle Wendt	T	Ohio State	
6	60	Cleveland Rams	Chris Del Sasso	T	Indiana	
7	61	Philadelphia Eagles	Herb Barna	G	West Virginia	
7	62	Brooklyn Dodgers	Fred Funk	B	UCLA	
7	63	Chicago Cardinals	Herm Dickerson	E	VPI	
7	64	New York Giants	Buster Poole ^{†}	E	Ole Miss	
7	65	Pittsburgh Pirates	Byron Haines	B	Washington	
7	66	Washington Redskins	Rolla Holland	G	Kansas State	
7	67	Detroit Lions	John Sprague	B	SMU	
7	68	Chicago Bears	Buck Friedman	T	Rice	
7	69	Green Bay Packers	Marv Baldwin	T	TCU	
7	70	Cleveland Rams	Norm Schoen	T	Baldwin–Wallace	
8	71	Philadelphia Eagles	Nestor Hennon	B	Carnegie Tech	
8	72	Chicago Cardinals	John Reynolds	C	Baylor	
8	73	Brooklyn Dodgers	Steve Reid	T	Northwestern	
8	74	New York Giants	Gene Meyers	B	Kentucky	
8	75	Pittsburgh Pirates	Marty Kordick	E	St. Mary's (CA)	
8	76	Washington Redskins	Joel Eaves	E	Auburn	
8	77	Detroit Lions	Elvin Sayre	B	Illinois	
8	78	Chicago Bears	Steve Toth	C	Northwestern	
8	79	Green Bay Packers	Les Chapman	B	Tulsa	
8	80	Cleveland Rams	Herm Schmarr	T	Catholic University	
9	81	Philadelphia Eagles	Paul Fanning	B	Kansas State	
9	82	Brooklyn Dodgers	Ed Nowogrowski	B	Washington	
9	83	Chicago Cardinals	Dwight Hafeli	B	Washington University	
9	84	New York Giants	Dwight Scheyer	E	Washington State	
9	85	Pittsburgh Pirates	Matt Patanelli	T	Michigan	
9	86	Washington Redskins	Bill Docherty	G	Temple	
9	87	Detroit Lions	Larry Kelley	E	Yale	1936 Heisman Trophy winner
9	88	Chicago Bears	Al Guepe	E	Marquette	
9	89	Green Bay Packers	Gordon Dahlgren	G	Michigan State	
9	90	Cleveland Rams	Ray Johnson	T	Denver	
10	91	Philadelphia Eagles	Ray Antil	B	Minnesota	
10	92	Chicago Cardinals	Middleton Fitzsimmons	G	Georgia Tech	
10	93	Brooklyn Dodgers	Gil Kuhn	B	USC	
10	94	New York Giants	Chuck Gelatka ^{†}	E	Mississippi State	
10	95	Pittsburgh Pirates	Stan Nevers	T	Kentucky	
10	96	Washington Redskins	Mac Cara	G	NC State	
10	97	Detroit Lions	Kay Bell	G	Washington State	
10	98	Chicago Bears	Red Wade	E	Utah State	
10	99	Green Bay Packers	Dave Gavin	G	Holy Cross	
10	100	Cleveland Rams	Solon Holt	T	TCU	

== Hall of Famers ==
- Sammy Baugh, quarterback from Texas Christian University taken 1st Round 6th Overall by the Boston Redskins.

Inducted: Professional Football Hall of Fame class of 1963.

- Clarence “Ace” Parker, back from Duke University taken 2nd Round 13th Overall by the Brooklyn Dodgers.

Inducted: Professional Football Hall of Fame class of 1972.

== Notable undrafted players ==
†	= Pro Bowler

Original NFL team	Player	Pos.	College	Notes
Chicago Bears	George Wilson ^{†}	E	Northwestern	
Cleveland Rams	Chuck Cherundolo ^{†}	C/LB	Penn State	
New York Giants	Hank Soar ^{†}	HB/LB	Providence	
New York Giants	Bill Walls	E	TCU	
Philadelphia Eagles	Rabbit Keen	HB/QB	Arkansas	
