= Chuck Bond =

American football player (1914–1989)

No. 22
- Position: Tackle

Personal information
- Born: January 5, 1914; Fairland, Oklahoma, U.S.
- Died: September 24, 1989 (aged 75); Puyallup, Washington, U.S.
- Listed height: 6 ft 2 in (1.88 m)
- Listed weight: 236 lb (107 kg)

Career information
- High school: Hoquiam (Hoquiam, Washington)
- College: Washington
- NFL draft: 1937: 5th round, 46th overall pick

Career history
- Washington Redskins (1937–1938)

Awards and highlights
- NFL champion (1937); Third-team All-American (1936); First-team All-PCC (1936)

Career NFL statistics
- Games played: 22
- Games started: 1
- Stats at Pro Football Reference

Charles Eishmel Bond (January 5, 1914 – September 24, 1989) was an American professional football player who was an offensive tackle for the Washington Redskins of the National Football League (NFL). He played college football for the Washington Huskies, lettering in 1934, 1935, and 1936. Bond was the team captain for the 1936 season and was named to the 1936 All-Pacific Coast football team.

Bond was selected in the fifth round of the 1937 NFL draft by the Boston Redskins. Bond was backup tackle for the NFL Champion Washington Redskins (by the time the 1937 season started the Redskins had moved to Washington, D.C.). His brother Rink Bond also played for the Redskins in 1938.
