= 1937 Detroit Lions season =

NFL team season

- Head coach: Dutch Clark
- Home stadium: University of Detroit Stadium

Results
- Record: 7–4
- Division place: 2nd NFL Western
- Playoffs: Did not qualify

The 1937 Detroit Lions season was their eighth in the National Football League (NFL) and fourth in Detroit. The team failed to improve on their previous season's output of 8–4, winning only seven games, and did not qualify for the playoffs (league championship game) for a second consecutive season.

Through 2022, the most recent field goal by drop kick in the NFL was made this season by Lions' player-coach Dutch Clark. Made from nine yards out, it was the first score in a 16–7 home win over the Chicago Cardinals on September 19.

== Schedule ==
Week	Date	Opponent	Result	Record	Venue	Recap
1	September 10	at **Cleveland Rams**	**W** 28–0	1–0	League Park	Recap
2	September 19	**Chicago Cardinals**	**W** 16–7	2–0	University of Detroit Stadium	Recap
3	October 3	at **Green Bay Packers**	**L** 6–26	2–1	City Stadium	Recap
4	October 10	Pittsburgh Pirates	**W** 7–3	3–1	University of Detroit Stadium	Recap
5	October 17	Brooklyn Dodgers	**W** 30–0	4–1	University of Detroit Stadium	Recap
6	October 24	at **Chicago Bears**	**L** 20–28	4–2	Wrigley Field	Recap
7	October 31	**Green Bay Packers**	**L** 13–14	4–3	University of Detroit Stadium	Recap
8	November 7	**Cleveland Rams**	**W** 27–7	5–3	University of Detroit Stadium	Recap
9	November 14	at New York Giants	**W** 17–0	6–3	Polo Grounds	Recap
10	November 21	at **Chicago Cardinals**	**W** 16–7	7–3	Wrigley Field	Recap
11	November 25	**Chicago Bears**	**L** 0–13	7–4	University of Detroit Stadium	Recap

Note: Intra-division opponents are in bold text.

== Roster ==
1937 Detroit Lions final roster
Backs: 1 Ernie Caddel RB/CB; 3 Lloyd Cardwell RB/CB; 2 Frank Christensen RB/CB; 7 Dutch Clark RB/S/K; 5 Ace Gutowsky FB/LB; 6 Vern Huffman RB/CB/S; 23 Lee Kizzire FB/LB; 9 Bill Shepherd FB/LB/K	Linemen/Linebackers: 25 George Christensen T/G/DT/DG; 18 Hal Cooper C/LB; 20 Ox Emerson G/DG; 14 Bill Feldhaus G/DG; 22 Tom Hupke G/DG; 16 Jack Johnson T/DT; 19 Regis Monahan G/DG/K; 24 Bob Reynolds T/DT; 13 Del Ritchhart C/LB; 25 Red Stacy T/DT; 17 Dixie Stokes C/LB; 15 Sid Wagner G/DG	Ends/Receivers: 11 Harry Ebding; 12 Chuck Hanneman; 10 Ed Klewicki; 27 Butch Morse; rookies in italics

== Standings ==
NFL Western Division
	W	L	T	PCT	DIV	PF	PA	STK
Chicago Bears	9	1	1	.900	7–1	201	100	W4
Green Bay Packers	7	4	0	.636	6–2	220	122	L2
Detroit Lions	7	4	0	.636	4–4	180	105	L1
Chicago Cardinals	5	5	1	.500	3–5	135	165	L2
Cleveland Rams	1	10	0	.091	0–8	75	207	L9

Note: Tie games were not officially counted in the standings until 1972.
