= Ham Harmon =

American football player (1913–1997)

No. 18
- Position: Center

Personal information
- Born: April 2, 1913; Teague, Texas, U.S.
- Died: January 1, 1997 (aged 83); Denver, Colorado, U.S.
- Listed height: 6 ft 0 in (1.83 m)
- Listed weight: 220 lb (100 kg)

Career information
- High school: Denton (Denton, Texas)
- College: Tulsa (1934-36)
- NFL draft: 1937: 5th round, 43rd overall pick

Career history
- Chicago Cardinals (1937)

Career NFL statistics
- Games played: 6
- Games started: 6
- Stats at Pro Football Reference

Hamlett "Ham" S. Harmon (April 2, 1913 – January 1, 1997) was an American professional football player for the Chicago Cardinals of the NFL. He was drafted in the fifth round of the 1937 NFL Draft with the 43rd overall pick. He played a total of six games.

== Awards and honors ==
- Tulsa Golden Hurricane team captain (1936)
- Tulsa University Athletic Hall of Fame (inducted in 1986)

== Personal life ==
Harmon is Elise Harmon's brother.
