= John Wiatrak =

American football player (1913–2000)

No. 40, 13
- Position: Center

Personal information
- Born: March 30, 1913; Chicago, Illinois, U.S.
- Died: October 21, 2000 (aged 87); Olympia, Washington, U.S.
- Listed height: 6 ft 0 in (1.83 m)
- Listed weight: 220 lb (100 kg)

Career information
- College: Washington
- NFL draft: 1937: 4th round, 40th overall pick

Career history
- Los Angeles Bulldogs (1938); Detroit Lions (1939)

Career NFL statistics
- Games played: 1
- Stats at Pro Football Reference

John Philip Wiatrak (March 30, 1913 – October 21, 2000) was a football center for the University of Washington. He was selected by the Cleveland Rams in the fourth round of the 1937 NFL draft. Wiatrak played one season for the Detroit Lions.

== Early life ==
John Wiatrak was born in Chicago, Illinois. He was one of the "Strauss Boys" who were recruited by Alfred "Doc" Strauss. Dr. Alfred Strauss, a renowned surgeon and a pioneer in cancer research, was a Washington alumnus that moved to Chicago when he attended medical school. Over the years he recruited more than 100 football players from the Chicago area to the University of Washington, several of whom became All Americans.

== Football career ==
At the University of Washington Wiatrak lettered in 1934, '35 and '36 seasons. He was honored by playing, along with his teammate Max Starcevich, in the 1937 Chicago Tribune All-Star Game. He was a backup center for the collegiate team that defeated the defending NFL Champion Green Bay Packers, 6–0. John was drafted by the Cleveland Rams but did not play for them. Later he did play one in one game for the 1939 Detroit Lions.

== Later life ==
Waitrak married a Seattle girl, Muriel Ralston. They moved to Chicago in 1939 and founded an electrical contracting company. John and Muriel moved back to Western Washington in 1980 and lived in Olympia until their deaths.
