= Charley Malone =

American football player (1910–1992)

No. 19
- Position: End

Personal information
- Born: June 18, 1910; Hillsboro, Texas, U.S.
- Died: May 23, 1992 (aged 81); Lake San Marcos, California, U.S.

Career information
- College: Texas A&M

Career history
- St. Louis Gunners (1933); Boston Redskins (1934–1936); Washington Redskins (1937–1942)

Awards and highlights
- 2× NFL champion (1937, 1942); Pro Bowl (1942); NFL receiving yards leader (1935)

Career statistics
- Games played: 84
- Starts: 71
- Receptions: 137
- Receiving yards: 1,932
- Stats at Pro Football Reference

Charles C. Malone (June 18, 1910 – May 23, 1992) was an American football end in the National Football League (NFL).

Charley (alternately spelled Charlie in some sources) played football for four years at Texas A&M, 1929–1932, and served in the U.S. Marine Corps. He played professional football for the Boston/Washington Redskins for 8 years (1934–42) as well as the pre-NFL, St. Louis Gunners.

In an era in which each NFL team's roster was capped at 33 players, Malone played offensive and defensive end for the Redskins. As a wide receiver, Malone caught most of his passes from fellow Texan Sammy Baugh. Malone led the NFL in receiving in 1935 and finished 5 NFL seasons among the top 10 in receptions. He was selected to play in the NFL Pro Bowl in 1942.

His teams twice won the NFL championship (1937 and 1942).
