= Jules Alfonse =

American football player (1911–2000)

No. 5, 29, 10, 12
- Position: Wingback

Personal information
- Born: October 12, 1911; Cumberland, Wisconsin, U.S.
- Died: May 21, 2000 (aged 88); Windsor, Vermont, U.S.
- Listed height: 5 ft 8 in (1.73 m)
- Listed weight: 180 lb (82 kg)

Career information
- High school: Cumberland
- College: Minnesota (1934–1936)
- NFL draft: 1937: 2nd round, 20th overall pick

Career history

Playing
- Cleveland Rams (1937–1938); Columbus Bullies (1939–1941)

Coaching
- Columbus Bullies (1939, 1941) Backfield coach

Awards and highlights
- 3× National champion (1934–1936)

Career NFL statistics
- Rushing yards: 76
- Rushing average: 1.6
- Receptions: 7
- Receiving yards: 160
- Total touchdowns: 2
- Stats at Pro Football Reference

Julius P. Alfonse (October 12, 1911 – May 21, 2000) was an American professional football wingback in the National Football League (NFL). He was a second round selection (20th overall pick) by the Cleveland Rams out of Minnesota in the 1937 NFL draft.

He died in 2000.
