= Henry Krause =

American football player and coach (1913–1987)

No. 41
- Position: Center / Guard

Personal information
- Born: August 28, 1913; St. Louis, Missouri, U.S.
- Died: February 20, 1987 (aged 73); Takoma Park, Maryland, U.S.
- Listed height: 6 ft 1 in (1.85 m)
- Listed weight: 212 lb (96 kg)

Career information
- College: St. Louis

Career history
- Brooklyn Dodgers (1936–1937); Washington Redskins (1937–1938)

Awards and highlights
- NFL champion (1937)
- Stats at Pro Football Reference

Henry J. "Red" Krause Jr. (August 28, 1913 – February 20, 1987) was an American football offensive lineman in the National Football League (NFL) for the Brooklyn Dodgers and the Washington Redskins. He played college football at St. Louis University.
