= 1937 Green Bay Packers season =

NFL team season

- Head coach: Curly Lambeau
- Home stadium: City Stadium; Wisconsin State Fair Park

Results
- Record: 7–4
- Division place: 2nd NFL Western
- Playoffs: Did not qualify

The 1937 Green Bay Packers season was their 19th season overall and their 17th season in the National Football League. The team finished with a 7–4 record under coach Curly Lambeau, earning them a second-place finish in the Western Conference.

== Schedule ==
Week	Date	Opponent	Result	Record	Venue	Attendance	Recap	Sources
1	September 12	**Chicago Cardinals**	**L** 7–14	0–1	City Stadium	10,000	Recap	
2	September 19	**Chicago Bears**	**L** 2–14	0–2	City Stadium	16,658	Recap	
—	September 26	Bye						
3	October 3	**Detroit Lions**	**W** 26–6	1–2	City Stadium	17,553	Recap	
4	October 10	**Chicago Cardinals**	**W** 34–13	2–2	Wisconsin State Fair Park	16,181	Recap	
5	October 17	at **Cleveland Rams**	**W** 35–10	3–2	League Park		Recap	
6	October 24	**Cleveland Rams**	**W** 35–7	4–2	City Stadium		Recap	
7	October 31	at **Detroit Lions**	**W** 14–13	5–2	University of Detroit Stadium		Recap	
8	November 7	at **Chicago Bears**	**W** 24–14	6–2	Wrigley Field		Recap	
9	November 14	Philadelphia Eagles	**W** 37–7	7–2	Wisconsin State Fair Park		Recap	
10	November 21	at New York Giants	**L** 0–10	7–3	Polo Grounds		Recap	
11	November 28	at Washington Redskins	**L** 6–14	7–4	Griffith Stadium		Recap	
Note: Intra-division opponents in **bold** text.

== Roster ==
1937 Green Bay Packers final roster
Backs: 21 Herb Banet RB/CB; 18 Hank Bruder RB/CB/S; 44 Buckets Goldenberg RB/S; 38 Arnie Herber RB/CB; 30 Clarke Hinkle FB/LB/K; 25 Eddie Jankowski FB/LB; 24 Joe Laws RB/CB; 3 Paul Miller RB/CB; 5 Bob Monnett RB/CB; 17 George Sauer RB/CB; 4 Herm Schneidman RB/S	Linemen/Linebackers: 34 Tiny Engebretsen G/DG/K; 39 Lon Evans G/DG; 47 Lou Gordon T/DT; 40 Bill Lee T/DT; 29 Darrell Lester C/LB; 46 Russ Letlow G/DG; 36 Mike Michalske G/DG; 37 Zud Schammel G/DG; 41 Champ Seibold T/DT; 45 Ernie Smith T/DT/K; 26 Lyle Sturgeon T/DT; 7 Bud Svendsen C/LB; 43 George Svendsen C/LB	Ends/Receivers: 32 Wayland Becker; 22 Milt Gantenbein; 14 Don Hutson; 11 Bernie Scherer; Rookies in italics

== Standings ==
NFL Western Division
	W	L	T	PCT	DIV	PF	PA	STK
Chicago Bears	9	1	1	.900	7–1	201	100	W4
Green Bay Packers	7	4	0	.636	6–2	220	122	L2
Detroit Lions	7	4	0	.636	4–4	180	105	L1
Chicago Cardinals	5	5	1	.500	3–5	135	165	L2
Cleveland Rams	1	10	0	.091	0–8	75	207	L9

Note: Tie games were not officially counted in the standings until 1972.
