= Ed Justice =

American football player (1912–1991)

No. 13
- Position: End

Personal information
- Born: November 19, 1912; Post Falls, Idaho, U.S.
- Died: October 26, 1991 (aged 78); Anacortes, Washington, U.S.
- Listed height: 6 ft 1 in (1.85 m)
- Listed weight: 200 lb (91 kg)

Career information
- High school: Clarkson (Clarkston, Washington)
- College: Gonzaga
- NFL draft: 1936: undrafted

Career history
- Boston/Washington Redskins (1936–1942)

Awards and highlights
- 2× NFL champion (1937, 1942); 1942 Pro Bowl

Career NFL statistics
- Games played: 63
- Games started: 26
- Receiving yards: 1,006 (14.4 average)
- Receiving touchdown: 9
- Rushing yards: 137 (3.1 average)
- Rushing touchdowns: 1
- Stats at Pro Football Reference

Edward S. "Chug" Justice (November 19, 1912 – October 26, 1991) was an American football end in the National Football League (NFL) for the Boston/Washington Redskins.

== College career ==
Justice attended and played college football at Gonzaga University, playing in the 1930s under the coaching of Mike Pecarovich. Justice was selected to play for the West in the 1936 East–West Shrine Game. During this game he was named best blocking back and best defensive back.

== Professional career ==
Justice played seven seasons for the Boston/Washington Redskins, from 1936 to 1942, as a member of a team that won four divisional championships and two NFL championships, in 1937 and 1942. Justice was nicknamed "Chug" by his Redskins teammates, a tip of the hat to his running prowess and ability to "chug" through the line. In 1937 Justice caught the winning touchdown pass from Sammy Baugh against Chicago to win the league championship. He was named to the 1942 Pro Bowl team.

== Life after football ==
Following his professional football career Justice served as a member of the armed forces in World War II, and later as a Spokane, Washington businessman.

== Honors ==
- Named to Inland Northwest Sports Hall of Fame (1987)
- Named to Gonzaga University Hall of Fame (1988)
