= Rink Bond =

American football player (1914–1982)

No. 43
- Positions: Quarterback, offensive tackle

Personal information
- Born: November 14, 1914; Fairland, Oklahoma, United States
- Died: April 1982 (age 67)
- Listed height: 5 ft 10 in (1.78 m)
- Listed weight: 200 lb (91 kg)

Career information
- College: Washington

Career history
- Washington Redskins (1938); Pittsburgh Pirates (1939)

Career statistics
- Games played: 12
- Stats at Pro Football Reference

Randal Earl "Rink" Bond (November 14, 1914 – April 1982) was an American football player in the National Football League for the Washington Redskins and the Pittsburgh Pirates. He played college football at the University of Washington. His brother Chuck Bond also played for the Redskins in 1938.
