= Henry Hammond (American football) =

American football player (1913–2004)

No. 15
- Position: End

Personal information
- Born: February 23, 1913; Memphis, Tennessee, U.S.
- Died: August 19, 2004 (aged 91); Memphis, Tennessee, U.S.
- Listed height: 5 ft 11 in (1.80 m)
- Listed weight: 190 lb (86 kg)

Career information
- High school: Central (Memphis)
- College: Southwestern (TN) (1933-1936)
- NFL draft: 1937: 4th round, 38th overall pick

Career history
- Chicago Bears (1937)

Awards and highlights
- First-team Little All-American (1936)

Career NFL statistics
- Games played: 6
- Games started: 3
- Stats at Pro Football Reference

Henry Thomas Hammond (February 23, 1913 – August 19, 2004) was an American professional football player. He was selected in the fourth round of the 1937 NFL draft. He played professionally as an end for the Chicago Bears of the National Football League (NFL) in 1937.

== Personal life ==
In college, Hammond was a member of the Alpha Tau Omega fraternity, was often referred to as "Ug”, and lettered in track in addition to football.
