= Jim Barber (American football) =

American football player (1912–1998)

No. 15
- Position: Tackle

Personal information
- Born: July 21, 1912; Murfreesboro, Tennessee, U.S.
- Died: January 30, 1998 (aged 85); Spokane, Washington, U.S.
- Listed height: 6 ft 3 in (1.91 m)
- Listed weight: 223 lb (101 kg)

Career information
- High school: Manteca (Manteca, California)
- College: San Francisco

Career history

Playing
- Boston/Washington Redskins (1935–1941)

Coaching
- Fleet City (1945) Assistant coach; New York Yankees (1946–1948) Line coach; Chicago Hornets (1949) Line coach

Awards and highlights
- NFL champion (1937); Pro Bowl (1940); First-team All-PCC (1934)

Career statistics
- Games played: 76
- Starts: 59
- Stats at Pro Football Reference

James Rettig Barber (July 21, 1912 – January 30, 1998) was an American football tackle in the National Football League (NFL) for the Boston/Washington Redskins. He played college football at the University of San Francisco. Barber made the 1939 NFL All Pro team and was elected to the 1940 NFL Pro Bowl team.

== Post NFL career ==
Barber joined the Navy during World War II and was stationed at Farragut Naval Training Station. Upon discharge, he became an assistant coach for the football team New York Yankees and Chicago Hornets of the All-America Football Conference (AAFC) under head coach Ray Flaherty. In 1949, he became an executive at Bill Hatch Sporting Goods in Spokane, Washington. In 1969, he entered the investment securities business and worked at G.C. George Securities, Inc., Pennaluna & Co., and L.L. Nicholls Co., which he bought and operated until his retirement in 1977.
