= Bud Svendsen =

American football player and coach (1915–1996)

No. 7, 53, 66, 18
- Positions: Center, Linebacker, Guard

Personal information
- Born: February 7, 1915; Minneapolis, Minnesota, U.S.
- Died: August 6, 1996 (aged 81); Edina, Minnesota, U.S.
- Listed height: 6 ft 1 in (1.85 m)
- Listed weight: 190 lb (86 kg)

Career information
- High school: Marshall-University (Minneapolis)
- College: Minnesota (1933-1936)
- NFL draft: 1937: 4th round, 39th overall pick

Career history

Playing
- Green Bay Packers (1937, 1939); Brooklyn Dodgers (1940–1943); Bethlehem Bulldogs (1949)*
- * Offseason or practice squad member only

Coaching
- Kirksville (1938) Head coach; Hamilton (1946–1948) Head coach; Lafayette (1949–?) Line coach

Awards and highlights
- NFL champion (1939); NFL All-Star (1939); Green Bay Packers Hall of Fame (1985); 2× National champion (1935, 1936)

Career NFL statistics
- Games played: 57
- Games started: 42
- Interceptions: 5
- Stats at Pro Football Reference

Head coaching record
- Career: 8–18 (.308)

Earl Gilbert "Bud" Svendsen (February 7, 1915 – August 6, 1996) was an American professional football player who was a center and linebacker for six seasons with the Green Bay Packers and the Brooklyn Dodgers of the National Football League (NFL). He was inducted into the Green Bay Packers Hall of Fame in 1985.

Drafted in the fourth round by the Packers in 1937, Bud Svendsen joined his brother, George Svendsen, in Green Bay that year. In 1938, he left to coach Northeast Missouri State College (now Truman State University) in Kirksville for a season. The 6’1”, 195-pound Svendsen, a center and linebacker, returned to play in the 1939 season including the '39 championship victory over the New York Giants. He was inducted into the Green Bay Packers Hall of Fame.

Svendsen, a University of Minnesota star, scored a touchdown against the Brooklyn Dodgers in 1939 and picked off a Len Barnum pass in the ‘39 championship game, played at State Fair Park in Milwaukee.

After his playing career ended, he worked as an assistant coach at the University of Minnesota, University of Connecticut, Lafayette College, and Northwestern University. He also served as the head coach at Hamilton College from 1946 to 1948.

== Head coaching record ==
Year	Team	Overall	Conference	Standing	Bowl/playoffs
Kirksville Bulldogs (Missouri Intercollegiate Athletic Association) (1938)
1938	Kirksville	3–5	2–3	4th	
Kirksville:		3–5	2–3		
Hamilton Continentals (Independent) (1946–1948)
1946	Hamilton	2–2			
1947	Hamilton	1–6			
1948	Hamilton	2–5			
Hamilton:		5–13			
Total:		8–18			
