= Lyle Sturgeon =

American football player (1914–1958)

No. 26
- Position: Tackle

Personal information
- Born: January 18, 1914; Carnduff, Saskatchewan, Canada
- Died: December 28, 1958 (aged 44); Green Bay, Wisconsin, U.S.
- Listed height: 6 ft 3 in (1.91 m)
- Listed weight: 250 lb (113 kg)

Career information
- High school: Moorhead (Moorhead, Minnesota)
- College: North Dakota State

Career history
- Green Bay Packers (1937–1938)

Career statistics
- Games played: 7
- Stats at Pro Football Reference

Lyle R. Sturgeon (January 18, 1914 – December 28, 1958) was a professional American football player who played tackle for the Green Bay Packers. He played college football at North Dakota State University before playing professionally. After his career, he worked for the Olson Transportation Co.

== Early life and college ==
Lyle Sturgeon was born on January 18, 1914, in Carnduff, Saskatchewan. He attended Moorhead High School in Moorhead, Minnesota before playing football at North Dakota State University, where he played in the 1936 East-West Game. He was on the varsity team for three seasons at North Dakota State.

== Professional career ==
Head coach Curly Lambeau signed Sturgeon to a contract with the Green Bay Packers prior to the 1937 NFL season. Sturgeon was noted for his speed and good physical condition, as well as his ability to play on either side of the offensive line. Sturgeon played in seven games during the 1937 season, all as a tackle. During the 1937 season, Lambeau moved Sturgeon to the right side of the offensive line, even though he had played primarily on the left side in college. Sturgeon did not see a lot of success at this position, but saw great improvement when he was moved back to the left side of the offensive line near the end of the season. Lambeau signed Sturgeon to a contract for the 1938 NFL season in July 1938. Sturgeon again played offensive tackle for the Packers in 1938, although at least during one game he also kicked a field goal.

== Personal life ==
After his football career, Sturgeon worked for the Olson Transportation Co. as a sales person. He had a wife and one daughter. Sturgeon died on December 28, 1958, at the age of 44 from a heart attack.
