= 1937 New York Giants season =

NFL team 13th season

- Head coach: Steve Owen
- Home stadium: Polo Grounds

Results
- Record: 6–3–2
- Division place: 2nd NFL Eastern
- Playoffs: Did not qualify

The 1937 New York Giants season marked the franchise's 13th year in the National Football League (NFL). The club played an 11 game regular season schedule, finishing with a record of 6 wins, 3 losses, and 2 ties — good for second place in the Eastern Division but missing the League Championship Playoff.

== Preseason ==
Week	Date	Opponent	Result	Record	Venue	Attendance	Reference
1	September 12	New Rochelle Bulldogs	W 35–0	1–0	New Rochelle, New York		

== Schedule ==
Game	Date	Opponent	Result	Record	Venue	Attendance	Recap	Sources
1	September 16	at **Washington Redskins**	**L** 3–13	0–1	Griffith Stadium	24,500	Recap	
2	September 26	at **Pittsburgh Pirates**	**W** 10–7	1–1	Forbes Field	33,095	Recap	
3	October 3	at **Philadelphia Eagles**	**W** 16–7	2–1	Municipal Stadium	12,127	Recap	
—	Bye							
4	October 17	**Philadelphia Eagles**	**W** 21–0	3–1	Polo Grounds	20,089	Recap	
5	October 24	**Brooklyn Dodgers**	**W** 21–0	4–1	Polo Grounds	25,000	Recap	
6	October 31	Chicago Bears	**T** 3–3	4–1–1	Polo Grounds	50,449	Recap	
7	November 7	**Pittsburgh Pirates**	**W** 17–0	5–1–1	Polo Grounds	21,447	Recap	
8	November 14	Detroit Lions	**L** 0–17	5–2–1	Polo Grounds	35,790	Recap	
9	November 21	Green Bay Packers	**W** 10–0	6–2–1	Polo Grounds	38,965	Recap	
10	November 25	at **Brooklyn Dodgers**	**T** 13–13	6–2–2	Ebbets Field	27,000	Recap	
11	December 5	**Washington Redskins**	**L** 14–49	6–3–2	Polo Grounds	58,285	Recap	
Note: Intra-division opponents are in **bold** text.

== Standings ==
Program for the October 31 game against the Chicago Bears.

Program for the November 11 game against the Pittsburgh Pirates.

NFL Eastern Division
	W	L	T	PCT	DIV	PF	PA	STK
Washington Redskins	8	3	0	.727	6–2	195	120	W2
New York Giants	6	3	2	.667	5–2–1	128	109	L1
Pittsburgh Pirates	4	7	0	.364	4–4	122	145	L1
Brooklyn Dodgers	3	7	1	.300	2–5–1	82	174	T1
Philadelphia Eagles	2	8	1	.200	2–6	86	177	L1

Note: Tie games were not officially counted in the standings until 1972.

== See also ==
- List of New York Giants seasons
