= Les Olsson =

American football player and coach (1909–1972)

No. 21
- Position: Guard

Personal information
- Born: August 18, 1909; Akron, Ohio, U.S.
- Died: July 2, 1972 (aged 62); Barberton, Ohio, U.S.

Career information
- High school: Akron (OH) Central
- College: Mercer

Career history
- Boston/Washington Redskins (1934–1938)

Awards and highlights
- NFL champion (1937)

Career statistics
- Games played: 57
- Starts: 47
- Stats at Pro Football Reference

Carl Lester Olsson (August 18, 1909 – July 2, 1972) was an American football offensive lineman in the National Football League (NFL) for the Boston/Washington Redskins. He attended Mercer University.

After his playing career, Olsson was the football head coach for 25 years at Akron Manchester High School.
