= Ed Kawal =

American football player (1909–1960)

No. 39
- Position: Center

Personal information
- Born: October 13, 1909; Cicero, Illinois, U.S.
- Died: September 25, 1960 (aged 50); Oak Park, Illinois, U.S.
- Listed height: 6 ft 2 in (1.88 m)
- Listed weight: 200 lb (91 kg)

Career information
- High school: Cicero (IL) Morton
- College: Widener

Career history
- Chicago Bears (1931, 1935–1936); Washington Redskins (1937)

Awards and highlights
- NFL champion (1937); Second-team All-Big Ten (1929)

Career statistics
- Games played: 46
- Starts: 35
- Stats at Pro Football Reference

Edward Joseph Kawal (October 13, 1909 – September 25, 1960) was an American professional football player who was a center in the National Football League (NFL) for the Chicago Bears and Washington Redskins. He attended the University of Illinois and Pennsylvania Military College.
