= Harold Cooper (American football) =

American football player (1912–1972)

Hal Cooper
No. 18
- Positions: Center, guard

Personal information
- Born: December 12, 1912; Detroit, Michigan, U.S.
- Died: October 2, 1972 (aged 59); Detroit, Michigan, U.S.
- Listed height: 5 ft 10 in (1.78 m)
- Listed weight: 207 lb (94 kg)

Career information
- High school: Western (Detroit, Michigan)
- College: Detroit

Career history
- Detroit Lions (1937)

Career statistics
- Games: 7
- Stats at Pro Football Reference

Harold W. "Bud" Cooper (December 12, 1912 – October 2, 1972) was an American football player. He played college football for the University of Detroit from 1933 to 1936 and professional football for the Detroit Lions in 1937. He also served as a Detroit police officer from 1937 to 1964.

== Early life ==
Cooper was born in Detroit in 1912 and attended Detroit's Western High School. From 1933 to 1936, he played college football at the University of Detroit under head coach Gus Dorais. In his junior and senior seasons, he helped lead the Detroit Titans football team to a 13–6 record and earned a reputation for intercepting passes, tossing laterals to teammates, and out-performing All-American candidates from larger schools. On Thanksgiving Day in 1936, in his final college game, he made "tackle after tackle, intercepted two passes, and was credited with "playing the best game of his career." He received a bachelor's degree in education from the University of Detroit in 1937.

== Professional football ==
In December 1936, Cooper signed a contract to play professional football for the Detroit Lions of the National Football League (NFL). He played, initially at the guard position, for the Lions, shifting to center in November 1937. He appeared in seven NFL games, one as a starter, during the 1937 season.

== Family and later years ==
Cooper was secretly married in 1936. He worked for the Detroit Police Department from 1937 to 1964, retiring as a detective sergeant. He later worked as an attendance officer in the Detroit schools. He died in 1972 in Detroit.
