= 1937 Chicago Cardinals season =

American football team season

- Head coach: Milan Creighton
- Home stadium: Wrigley Field

Results
- Record: 5–5–1
- Division place: 4th NFL Western
- Playoffs: Did not qualify

The 1937 Chicago Cardinals season was their 18th in the league. The team improved on their previous output of 3–8–1, winning five games. Playing their first eight games on the road, they failed to qualify for the playoffs for the 12th consecutive season.

== Schedule ==
Week	Date	Opponent	Result	Record	Venue	Recap
1	Bye					
2	September 12	at **Green Bay Packers**	**W** 14–7	1–0	City Stadium	Recap
3	September 19	at **Detroit Lions**	**L** 7–16	1–1	University of Detroit Stadium	Recap
4	September 24	at Washington Redskins	**W** 21–14	2–1	Griffith Stadium	Recap
4	September 26	at Philadelphia Eagles	**T** 6–6	2–1–1	Philadelphia Municipal Stadium	Recap
5	October 3	at **Cleveland Rams**	**W** 6–0	3–1–1	League Park	Recap
6	October 10	at **Green Bay Packers**	**L** 13–34	3–2–1	Wisconsin State Fair Park	Recap
7	October 17	at **Chicago Bears**	**L** 7–16	3–3–1	Wrigley Field	Recap
8	October 24	at Pittsburgh Pirates	**W** 13–7	4–3–1	Forbes Field	Recap
9	October 31	**Cleveland Rams**	**W** 13–7	5–3–1	Wrigley Field	Recap
10	Bye					
11	Bye					
12	November 21	**Detroit Lions**	**L** 7–16	5–4–1	Wrigley Field	Recap
13	Bye					
14	December 5	**Chicago Bears**	**L** 28–42	5–5–1	Wrigley Field	Recap
Note: Intra-division opponents are in **bold** text.

== Standings ==
NFL Western Division
	W	L	T	PCT	DIV	PF	PA	STK
Chicago Bears	9	1	1	.900	7–1	201	100	W4
Green Bay Packers	7	4	0	.636	6–2	220	122	L2
Detroit Lions	7	4	0	.636	4–4	180	105	L1
Chicago Cardinals	5	5	1	.500	3–5	135	165	L2
Cleveland Rams	1	10	0	.091	0–8	75	207	L9

Note: Tie games were not officially counted in the standings until 1972.
