= Herm Schneidman =

American football player (1913–2008)

Profile
- Position: Blocking back

Personal information
- Born: November 22, 1913; Rock Island, Illinois, U.S.
- Died: August 12, 2008 (aged 94); Quincy, Illinois, U.S.
- Listed height: 5 ft 11 in (1.80 m)
- Listed weight: 201 lb (91 kg)

Career information
- High school: Quincy (IL)
- College: Iowa

Career history
- Green Bay Packers (1935–1939); Chicago Cardinals (1940)

Awards and highlights
- 2× NFL champion (1936, 1939)
- Stats at Pro Football Reference

Herman Schneidman (November 22, 1913 – August 12, 2008) was an American professional football player for the Green Bay Packers and the Chicago Cardinals.

== College career ==
Schneidman played collegiate football at the University of Iowa.

== Professional career ==
=== Green Bay Packers ===
When Scheidman left the University of Iowa, he signed with the Green Bay Packers and played mainly Blocking back, the forerunner to a fullback, on offense. He played with the Packers from 1935 to 1939 and was a member of their 1936 and 1939 league titles. Schneidman played in 40 games for the Packers with 16 starts. He rushed 13 times for 37 yards during his career and caught seven passes for 119 yards and two touchdowns. Schneidman wore No. 4 during his first three seasons in Green Bay, a jersey later made famous by quarterback Brett Favre. Herm attempted to play for the Packers in 1940 but was released in training camp.

=== Chicago Cardinals ===
After being released by the Packers, Herm signed with the Chicago Cardinals and played for one more season before retiring and joining the Navy.

== Death ==
Scheidman died on August 12, 2008, in Quincy, Illinois, at the age of 95.
