= Jimmie Cain =

American football player and official (1912–2007)

No. 62
- Position: Halfback

Personal information
- Born: September 5, 1912; Arkansas, U.S.
- Died: August 26, 2007 (age 94); Rancho Mirage, California, U.S.
- Listed height: 5 ft 8 in (1.73 m)
- Listed weight: 175 lb (79 kg)

Career information
- High school: Holdenville
- College: Washington
- NFL draft: 1937: 6th round, Boston Shamrocks / Washington Redskinsth overall pick

Awards and highlights
- First-team All-American (1936); First-team All-PCC (1936); State of Washington Sports Hall of Fame, 1997; University of Washington Athletic Hall of Fame

James McEvilly Cain (September 5, 1912 – August 26, 2007) was an American football player and official.

Growing up in Oklahoma, Cain moved to the State of Washington to play college football for Jimmy Phelan, coach of the Washington Huskies. Cain played at all three backfield positions for the Huskies from 1934 to 1936 and was selected by Liberty magazine and Pathé News as a first-team halfback on the 1936 College Football All-America Team. Cain was selected by the Washington Redskins in the sixth round (56th overall pick) of the 1937 NFL draft.

Cain later worked as a Pac-10 football official, serving as referee in two Rose Bowl games and 14 East–West Shrine Games. As referee of the 1949 Rose Bowl, he overruled another official and ruled that Northwestern's Art Murakowski had not fumbled until after crossing the goal line; the controversial call gave Northwestern the winning margin in its 20–14 victory over California.

Cain was inducted into the State of Washington Sports Hall of Fame in 1997 and has also been inducted into the University of Washington Athletic Hall of Fame. He died in 2007 at age 94 in Rancho Mirage, California.
