= Bill Feldhaus =

American football player and coach (1912–1974)

- Bill Feldhaus, 1937

Profile
- Positions: Guard, tackle

Personal information
- Born: December 8, 1912; Cincinnati
- Died: June 2, 1974 (aged 61); Cincinnati
- Listed height: 6 ft 0 in (1.83 m)
- Listed weight: 226 lb (103 kg)

Career information
- High school: Hughes (OH)
- College: Cincinnati

Career history
- Detroit Lions (1937–1940)

Career statistics
- Games: 43
- Stats at Pro Football Reference

William Bernard Feldhaus (December 8, 1912 – June 2, 1974) was an American football player and coach. He played college football at Cincinnati and professional football for the Detroit Lions and held coaching positions at Miami (OH), Indiana, and Xavier.

== Early life ==
A native of Cincinnati, Calvelli attended Hughes High School and then played college football as a tackle at the University of Cincinnati. While at the university, he also played varsity baseball and basketball.

== Professional football ==
He also played professional football in the National Football League (NFL) for the Detroit Lions . He played as a guard for the Lions from 1937 to 1940, appearing in 43 games, 32 as a starter. He was known as an iron man football player who sat for less than 10 minutes per game. While playing with the Lions, he worked as an automobile salesman during the off-season.

== Coaching and later years ==
During World War II, Feldhaus served in the U.S. Navy, including duty as a football coach at the pre-flight school in Athens, Georgia. He served as the line coach at the Xavier from 1947 to 1950. He also worked as an assistant coach at Miami University and Indiana University and held positions in the insurance business and on the sales staff of a Chevrolet dealer. He suffered a stroke in 1953 and was disabled after 1963. He died in 1974 at a Cincinnati nursing home.
