= Bill Docherty =

American football player and coach (1915–1972)

Biographical details
- Born: March 5, 1915; New York, New York, U.S.
- Died: October 27, 1972 (aged 57); Bryn Mawr, Pennsylvania, U.S.

Playing career

Football
- 1933–1936: Temple
- 1937: Wilmington Clippers
- Position: Tackle

Coaching career (HC unless noted)

Football
- 1937–1941: Haverford (assistant)
- 1946–1950: Haverford (assistant)
- 1953–1962: Haverford (assistant)
- 1963–1966: Haverford

Basketball
- 1941–1943: Haverford
- 1947–1949: Haverford

Baseball
- 1943: Haverford
- 1960: Haverford

Head coaching record
- Overall: 5–22–1 (football); 17–39 (basketball)

William Docherty Jr. (March 5, 1915 – October 27, 1972) was an American football player and coach of football, basketball, baseball, and golf. He was selected in the ninth round of the 1937 NFL draft. He served as the head football coach at Haverford College from 1963 to 1966. Docherty was also the head basketball coach at Haverford, from 1941 to 1943 and 1947 to 1949, and the school's head baseball coach in 1943 and 1960.

== Biography ==
Docherty played college football as a tackle at Temple University. He was hired as line coach for the football team at Haverford in 1937. Aside from serving in the United States Navy from 1942 to 1945 and 1951 to 1952, Docherty remained an assistant coach for the Haverford Fords football team until succeeding Roy Randall as head coach in 1963. Docherty was also the head golf coach, director of intramural athletics, and a professor of physical education at Haverford. He served as Haverford head football coach for four seasons, compiling a record of 5–22–1 before resigning after the 1966 season.

Docherty died of cancer, on October 27, 1972, at Bryn Mawr Hospital in Bryn Mawr, Pennsylvania.

== Head coaching record ==
=== Football ===
Year	Team	Overall	Conference	Standing	Bowl/playoffs
Haverford Fords (Middle Atlantic Conference) (1963–1966)
1963	Haverford	2–5	2–4	9th (Southern College)	
1964	Haverford	0–6–1	0–5	11th (Southern College)	
1965	Haverford	2–5	2–3	6th (Southern College)	
1966	Haverford	1–6	1–5	10th (Southern College)	
Haverford:		5–22–1	5–17		
Total:		5–22–1			
