= Lamont, Washington =

Lamont
- Town
- Lamont, Washington
- Location of Lamont, Washington
- Coordinates: 47°12′02″N 117°54′18″W
- Country: United States
- State: Washington
- County: Whitman

Government
  - Type: Mayor–council
  - Mayor

Area
  - Total: 0.29 sq mi (0.75 km^{2})
  - Land: 0.29 sq mi (0.75 km^{2})
  - Water: 0 sq mi (0.00 km^{2})
- Elevation: 1,962 ft (598 m)

Population (2020)
  - Total: 79
  - Density: 270/sq mi (110/km^{2})
- Time zone: UTC-8 (Pacific (PST))
  - Summer (DST): UTC-7 (PDT)
- ZIP code: 99017
- Area code: 509
- FIPS code: 53-38215
- GNIS feature ID: 2412875

Lamont is a town in Whitman County, Washington, United States. The population was 79 at the 2020 census.

== History ==
Lamont was officially incorporated on October 22, 1910. The town was named for former vice president of the Northern Pacific Railway, Daniel Lamont. Lamont was initially founded as a terminal of the Spokane, Portland and Seattle Railway, a joint venture of the Jim Hill controlled railroads, Northern Pacific and Great Northern Railways. Lamont is on the Pasco-Spokane extension of the SP&S. The terminal included a depot, yard, 22 stall roundhouse and locomotive servicing facilities. These facilities included water and oil tanks for SP&S steam locomotives, and a 6 pocket coal dock for Northern Pacific Rwy steam locomotives. Crews from Spokane and Pasco would work to Lamont and lay over before working back home again. But the railroad shortly reconsidered the remote outpost of Lamont as a terminal, and when the roundhouse burned in 1913, crews started working through between Pasco and Spokane.

Trains still stopped at Lamont for fuel and water. In fact in the midst of the World War II, a steel coal dock from the Great Northern in Montana was moved to Lamont to replace the aging wooden dock in 1944. Steam locomotives last passed through Lamont on June 22, 1956, with diesel-electric locomotives hauling the trains thereafter. Fueling facilities for the diesel locomotives had been constructed at Lamont after WWII, but were abandoned in 1957 when they began to fuel in Pasco.

Lamont contributed a healthy amount of traffic to the railroad in the form of grain and livestock over the years. The grain elevators still stand as a landmark in town. In 1970 the "Hill Lines"; Great Northern Railway, Northern Pacific Railway, Chicago, Burlington & Quincy Railway, and the Spokane, Portland & Seattle Railway all merged to form the Burlington Northern Railroad. After the merger, the SP&S and NP lines between Pasco and Spokane were used like double track, with heavy lumber traffic running east over the easier grades of the former SP&S and westbound traffic on the former NP. But as export grain business began to surge in the late 1970s, the direction was flipped and the heavy grain trains began running west over the former SP&S through Lamont. Following the bad recession of the early 1980s, BN began to look at ways to reduce the amount of its track in Washington State. The former SP&S line didn't have much online business, and had issues with rockfall on the south end and flooding on the north end. In the mid 1980s, BN upgraded the former NP between Spokane and Pasco and moved all the through trains off the former SP&S in 1987. In 1991 the track was removed and the State of Washington obtained the former railroad line as a trail. Some remains of the roundhouse and service facilities still remain.

== Geography ==
According to the United States Census Bureau, the town has a total area of 0.29 square miles (0.75 km^{2}), all of it land.

== Demographics ==
Historical population
Census	Pop.	Note	%±
1920	165		—
1930	130		−21.2%
1940	135		3.8%
1950	101		−25.2%
1960	111		9.9%
1970	88		−20.7%
1980	101		14.8%
1990	91		−9.9%
2000	106		16.5%
2010	70		−34.0%
2020	79		12.9%
U.S. Decennial Census

=== 2010 census ===
As of the 2010 census, there were 70 people, 33 households, and 23 families living in the town. The population density was 241.4 inhabitants per square mile (93.2/km^{2}). There were 40 housing units at an average density of 137.9 per square mile (53.2/km^{2}). The racial makeup of the town was 90.0% White, 1.4% African American, 1.4% Asian, and 7.1% from two or more races. Hispanic or Latino of any race were 1.4% of the population.

There were 33 households, of which 24.2% had children under the age of 18 living with them, 51.5% were married couples living together, 9.1% had a female householder with no husband present, 9.1% had a male householder with no wife present, and 30.3% were non-families. 30.3% of all households were made up of individuals, and 6.1% had someone living alone who was 65 years of age or older. The average household size was 2.12 and the average family size was 2.57.

The median age in the town was 47.5 years. 18.6% of residents were under the age of 18; 9.9% were between the ages of 18 and 24; 14.3% were from 25 to 44; 37.1% were from 45 to 64; and 20% were 65 years of age or older. The gender makeup of the town was 54.3% male and 45.7% female.

=== 2000 census ===
As of the 2000 census, there were 106 people, 35 households, and 26 families living in the town. The population density was 369.0 people per square mile (141.1/km^{2}). There were 38 housing units at an average density of 132.3 per square mile (50.6/km^{2}). The racial makeup of the town was 94.34% White, 4.72% Native American, and 0.94% from two or more races.

There were 35 households, out of which 51.4% had children under the age of 18 living with them, 51.4% were married couples living together, 11.4% had a female householder with no husband present, and 25.7% were non-families. 20.0% of all households were made up of individuals, and 8.6% had someone living alone who was 65 years of age or older. The average household size was 3.03 and the average family size was 3.54.

In the town, the age distribution of the population shows 37.7% under the age of 18, 6.6% from 18 to 24, 31.1% from 25 to 44, 13.2% from 45 to 64, and 11.3% who were 65 years of age or older. The median age was 30 years. For every 100 females, there were 100.0 males. For every 100 females age 18 and over, there were 94.1 males.

The median income for a household in the town was $32,778, and the median income for a family was $32,750. Males had a median income of $31,250 versus $16,250 for females. The per capita income for the town was $10,026. There were 13.0% of families and 15.4% of the population living below the poverty line, including 5.7% of under eighteens and 33.3% of those over 64.
