= 1937 Cleveland Rams season =

NFL team season

- Head coach: Hugo Bezdek
- Home stadium: Cleveland Municipal Stadium; League Park

Results
- Record: 1–10
- Division place: 5th NFL Western
- Playoffs: Did not qualify

The 1937 Cleveland Rams season was the team's first year playing as a member club of the National Football League (NFL) and the second season based in Cleveland, Ohio.

== Schedule ==
Week	Date	Opponent	Result	Record	Venue	Attendance	Recap	Sources
1	Bye							
2	September 10	**Detroit Lions**	**L** 0–28	0–1	League Park	15,500	Recap	—
3	September 21	at Philadelphia Eagles	**W** 21–3	1–1	Philadelphia Municipal Stadium	3,107	Recap	
4	September 26	at Brooklyn Dodgers	**L** 7–9	1–2	Ebbets Field	12,000	Recap	—
5	October 3	**Chicago Cardinals**	**L** 0–6	1–3	League Park	10,000	Recap	—
6	October 10	**Chicago Bears**	**L** 2–20	1–4	League Park	5,000	Recap	—
7	October 17	**Green Bay Packers**	**L** 10–35	1–5	League Park	12,000	Recap	—
8	October 24	at **Green Bay Packers**	**L** 7–35	1–6	City Stadium	8,600	Recap	—
9	October 31	at **Chicago Cardinals**	**L** 7–13	1–7	Wrigley Field	9,923	Recap	—
10	November 7	at **Detroit Lions**	**L** 7–27	1–8	University of Detroit Stadium	24,800	Recap	—
11	Bye							
12	November 21	Washington Redskins	**L** 7–16	1–9	League Park	5,000	Recap	—
13	November 28	at **Chicago Bears**	**L** 7–15	1–10	Wrigley Field	4,188	Recap	—
Note: Intra-division opponents are in **bold** text.

== Roster ==
1937 Cleveland Rams final roster
Backs: 5 Julie Alfonse RB/CB; 6 John Bettridge FB/LB; 14 Johnny Drake FB/LB; 3 Wayne Gift RB/S; 28 Ed Goddard RB/CB; 12 Ray Johnson RB/CB; 7 Harry Mattos RB/CB; 1 Stan Pincura RB/S; 4 Bob Snyder RB/CB/K; 2 Joe Williams FB/LB	Linemen/Linebackers: 24 Forrest Burmeister G/T/DG; 21 Chuck Cherundolo C/LB; 23 Bob Emerick G/T/DG/DT; 15 Ralph Isselhardt G/DG; 18 Ted Livingston T/DT; 25 Ookie Miller G/DG; 27 Primo Miller T/DT; 17 Ted Rosequist T/DT; 13 Jim Turner C/LB; 26 Dick Zoll G/DG	Ends/Receivers: 22 Phil Bucklew; 19 Sam Busich; 16 Paul Halleck; 20 Walt Uzdavinis; Reserve: Vern Oech G/DG; rookies in italics

== Standings ==
NFL Western Division
	W	L	T	PCT	DIV	PF	PA	STK
Chicago Bears	9	1	1	.900	7–1	201	100	W4
Green Bay Packers	7	4	0	.636	6–2	220	122	L2
Detroit Lions	7	4	0	.636	4–4	180	105	L1
Chicago Cardinals	5	5	1	.500	3–5	135	165	L2
Cleveland Rams	1	10	0	.091	0–8	75	207	L9

Note: Tie games were not officially counted in the standings until 1972.
