= 1937 Chicago Bears season =

NFL team season

- Head coach: George Halas
- Home stadium: Wrigley Field

Results
- Record: 9–1–1
- Division place: 1st NFL Western
- Playoffs: Lost NFL Championship (vs. Redskins) 21–28

The 1937 Chicago Bears season was their 18th regular season completed in the National Football League. The Bears started the season fast, winning their first five games, three of them on the road. After a tie to the Giants and a loss to the Packers, the Bears finished the season strong, winning their last four games. The team was second in scoring offense, behind Green Bay, and led the league in scoring defense.

== 1937 NFL draft ==
1937 Chicago Bears draft
Round	Pick	Player	Position	College	Notes
1	8	Les McDonald	End	Nebraska	
2	18	Marvin Stewart	Center	LSU	
3	28	Dick Plasman *	End	Vanderbilt	
4	38	Henry Hammond	End	Rhodes	
5	48	Red Conkright	Center	Oklahoma	
6	58	Del Bjork *	Tackle	Oregon	
7	68	J. W. Friedman	Back	Rice	
8	78	Steve Toth	Back	Northwestern	
9	88	Al Guepe	Back	Marquette	
10	98	Ed "Red" Wade	Tackle	Utah State	
Made roster * Made at least one Pro Bowl during career

== Season highlights ==
The Bear offense relied on a rugged rushing attack and a quick-strike passing game. Sixteen of their 21 offensive touchdowns were through the air and the team averaged a league-leading 18.3 yards per completion. Future hall of fame end Bill Hewitt was gone to Philadelphia and Luke Johnsos did not play so coach Halas relied on young Les McDonald and "Eggs" Manske, along with veteran Bill Karr to catch the long ball. Bernie Masterson was still the primary quarterback but rookie Ray Buivid played regularly and showed promise, particularly in the season finale win over the Chicago Cardinals where he became the first player to pass for five touchdowns, and the only rookie to do so until 2015. Ray Nolting led the team in rushing, with Bronko Nagurski and Jack Manders contributing as well. Manders led the league in scoring with 8 field goals and 15 of 20 PATs, finishing with 69 points. The Bears' interior line was their real strong suit, however, with Musso, Stydahar, and Fortmann anchoring the best line in the NFL. Frank Bausch emerged as a top flight center as well. With a consistent offense and a solid defense, the Bears were the class of the West, finishing 2½ games ahead of the Packers and Lions and winning 3 of 4 games against those two teams.

On October 6, 1937, the team scheduled a charity exhibition game against the Warren Redjackets. Because Warren, Pennsylvania was too small of a city to support such a game, the game was held in Erie, Pennsylvania and Warren's fans were transported to Erie by rail. Chicago won the game 49–7.

== Future Hall of Fame players ==
- Dan Fortmann, guard
- George Musso, tackle
- Bronko Nagurski, fullback
- Joe Stydahar, tackle (rookie from West Virginia University)

== Other leading players ==
- Frank Bausch, center (acquired from Boston Redskins)
- Ray Buivid, back (rookie from Marquette)
- Bill Karr, end
- Jack Manders, fullback/kicker
- Edgar Manske, end (acquired from Philadelphia Eagles)
- Bernie Masterson, quarterback
- Les McDonald, end (rookie from University of Nebraska)
- Keith Molesworth, halfback
- Ray Nolting, halfback (rookie from University of Cincinnati)
- Gene Ronzani, back

== Players departed from 1936 ==
- Bill Hewitt, End (went to Philadelphia)
- Luke Johnsos, End (did not play for unknown reasons)

== Schedule ==
Week	Date	Opponent	Result	Record	Venue	Recap
1	Bye					
2	Bye					
3	September 19	at **Green Bay Packers**	**W** 14–2	1–0	City Stadium	Recap
4	Bye					
5	October 4	at Pittsburgh Pirates	**W** 7–0	2–0	Forbes Field	Recap
6	October 10	at **Cleveland Rams**	**W** 20–2	3–0	League Park	Recap
7	October 17	**Chicago Cardinals**	**W** 16–7	4–0	Wrigley Field	Recap
8	October 24	**Detroit Lions**	**W** 28–20	5–0	Wrigley Field	Recap
9	October 31	at New York Giants	**T** 3–3	5–0–1	Polo Grounds	Recap
10	November 7	**Green Bay Packers**	**L** 14–24	5–1–1	Wrigley Field	Recap
11	November 14	Brooklyn Dodgers	**W** 29–7	6–1–1	Wrigley Field	Recap
13	November 25	at **Detroit Lions**	**W** 13–0	7–1–1	Titan Stadium	Recap
13	November 28	**Cleveland Rams**	**W** 15–7	8–1–1	Wrigley Field	Recap
14	December 5	at **Chicago Cardinals**	**W** 42–28	9–1–1	Wrigley Field	Recap
Note: Intra-division opponents are in **bold** text.

== Standings ==
NFL Western Division
	W	L	T	PCT	DIV	PF	PA	STK
Chicago Bears	9	1	1	.900	7–1	201	100	W4
Green Bay Packers	7	4	0	.636	6–2	220	122	L2
Detroit Lions	7	4	0	.636	4–4	180	105	L1
Chicago Cardinals	5	5	1	.500	3–5	135	165	L2
Cleveland Rams	1	10	0	.091	0–8	75	207	L9

Note: Tie games were not officially counted in the standings until 1972.

== Championship Game ==
The Bears lost to the Washington Redskins at Wrigley Field 28–21. Rookie Sammy Baugh threw two fourth-quarter touchdown passes to upset the Bears. The Bears quarterbacks were ineffective, completing only 8 of 30 passes for 207 yards. Baugh set several NFL championship game records while completing 17 of 34 passes for 358 yards, three touchdowns and one interception.
