= 1937 NFL Championship Game =

Coordinates: 41.948°N 87.656°W

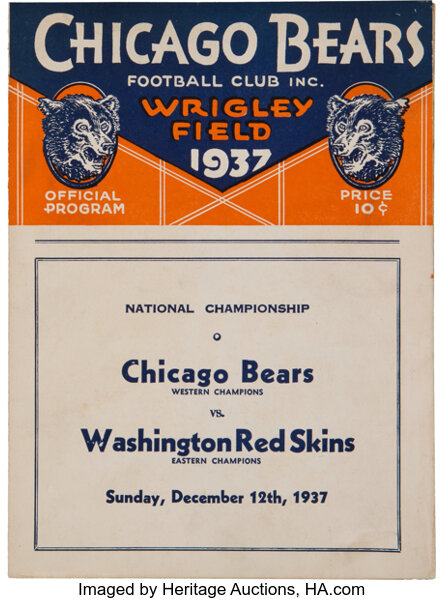
Washington Redskins (Eastern) (8–3)	Chicago Bears (Western) (9–1–1)
28	21
Head coach: Ray Flaherty	Head coach: George Halas
	1	2	3	4	Total
WAS	7	0	7	14	28
CHI	7	7	7	0	21
- Date: December 12, 1937
- Stadium: Wrigley Field; Chicago, Illinois
- Attendance: 15,878

Location in the United States

The 1937 NFL Championship Game was the fifth championship game of the National Football League (NFL), held December 12 at Wrigley Field in Chicago with an attendance of 15,878. The game featured the Western Division champions Chicago Bears (9–1–1) and the Eastern Division champions Washington Redskins (8–3), with the Redskins winning 28–21.

== Background ==
Prior to the 1937 season, Redskins owner George Preston Marshall moved the team from Boston to his hometown of Washington, D.C. The Boston Redskins won the Eastern Division title the previous season, but attendances were very poor in Boston, which forced Marshall to move the 1936 NFL Championship Game from Fenway Park to the Polo Grounds in New York City. The Redskins selected quarterback Sammy Baugh from TCU in the first round of the 1937 NFL draft, and the rookie led the league in passing with a then-record 81 pass completions, and Redskins halfback Cliff Battles led the NFL in rushing with 874 yards.

The Bears had a nine-win season under head coach George Halas, the last for Bears great Bronko Nagurski (other than a brief, one-year return to the Bears in 1943).

Baugh stated that the field conditions were, in his words "the worst field I ever saw. The field had been torn up the previous week, and it froze solid with jagged clods sticking up. I've never seen so many people get cut up in a football game."

Learning from the "Sneakers" game of 1934, both teams were prepared with a supply of basketball shoes in case of slippery field conditions. The temperature at kickoff in Chicago was 24 °F (−4 °C).

== Game summary ==
The Redskins scored first when Baugh led the team down to the Chicago 7-yard line, where he slipped the ball to Battles on a reverse for the game's first touchdown.

The Bears came back, however, as halfback Jack Manders scored the next fourteen points for the Bears: a touchdown run, a touchdown pass reception, and two extra points. Chicago led 14–7 at halftime.

Baugh took over in the second half, mixing short and long passes, shredding the Bears defense. (Baugh would finish the game 18-for-33 passing, for 335 yards; he had led the league in 1937 with an average of 102.5 yards passing per game.) Even using five defensive linemen (most teams used six at the time) and a sixth defensive back, the Bears could not stop the Redskins passing attack.

In the fourth quarter, the score was tied 21–21, before Baugh threw a 35-yard touchdown strike to Redskins wingback Ed Justice to take the lead for good, 28–21.

The First Fifty Years, a 1969 book that chronicles the first half-century of the NFL, listed the game as the second of "Ten Games That Mattered." "In his rookie year," the book concludes, "Sammy Baugh had beaten pro football's best with a style of play 15 years before its time. And in his first year in prestigious Washington, George Preston Marshall ran up a championship flag. Pro football was getting its base."

=== Scoring summary ===
Sunday, December 12, 1937
Kickoff: 1:15 p.m. CST

- First quarter
  - WAS – Cliff Battles 7-yard run (Riley Smith kick), 7–0 WAS
  - CHI – Jack Manders 10-yard run (Manders kick), 7–7 tie
- Second quarter
  - CHI – Manders 37-yard pass from Bernard Masterson (Manders kick), 14–7 CHI
- Third quarter
  - WAS – Wayne Millner 55-yard pass from Sammy Baugh (Smith kick), 14–14 tie
  - CHI – Edgar Manske 4-yard pass from Masterson (Manders kick), 21–14 CHI
- Fourth quarter
  - WAS – Millner 78-yard pass from Baugh (Smith kick), 21–21 tie
  - WAS – Ed Justice 35-yard pass from Baugh (Smith kick), 28–21 WAS

== Attendance and players shares of gate receipts ==
An anticipated attendance of 40,000 was not reached with the week's inclement weather in Chicago impacting the crowd size. The crowd of 15,870 was minuscule compared with attendance that Chicago had recently seen for amateur football competition. Only weeks earlier, the annual Chicago Prep Bowl game at Chicago's Soldier Field had attracted a historic crowd of approximately 120,000.

A portion of the gate receipts were distributed to players on the two teams. Each player on the winning Redskins team received $225, while the Bears received $127 each.

== Starters ==
Players played both ways, offensively and defensively, in 1937. Thus, there were only these eleven starters for each squad.

Washington Redskins

- LE - Wayne Millner ‡
- LT - Turk Edwards ‡
- LG - Les Olsson
- C - Ed Kawal
- RG - Jim Karcher
- RT - James Barber
- RE - Charley Malone
- QB †/K - Riley Smith
- LHB - Sammy Baugh ‡
- RHB - Erny Pinckert
- FB - Cliff Battles ‡

Chicago Bears

- LE - Edgar Manske
- LT - Joe Stydahar ‡
- LG - Dan Fortmann ‡
- C - Frank Bausch
- RG - George Musso ‡
- RT - Del Bjork
- RE - George Wilson
- QB - Bernie Masterson
- LHB - Ray Nolting
- RHB/K - Jack Manders
- FB - Bronko Nagurski ‡

† - Note: The quarterback in the single-wing offense was sometimes called the "blocking back", the ball was generally shotgun snapped to the left halfback or the fullback.
‡ - Member of the Professional Football Hall of Fame.

== Officials ==
The NFL had only four game officials in 1937; the back judge was added in 1947, the line judge in 1965, and the side judge in 1978. The four officials in this game were:

- Referee: Bill Halloran
- Umpire: Ed Cochrane
- Head linesman: Bobby Cahn
- Field judge: Tommy Hughitt
