= Sammy Baugh =

American football player and coach (1914–2008)

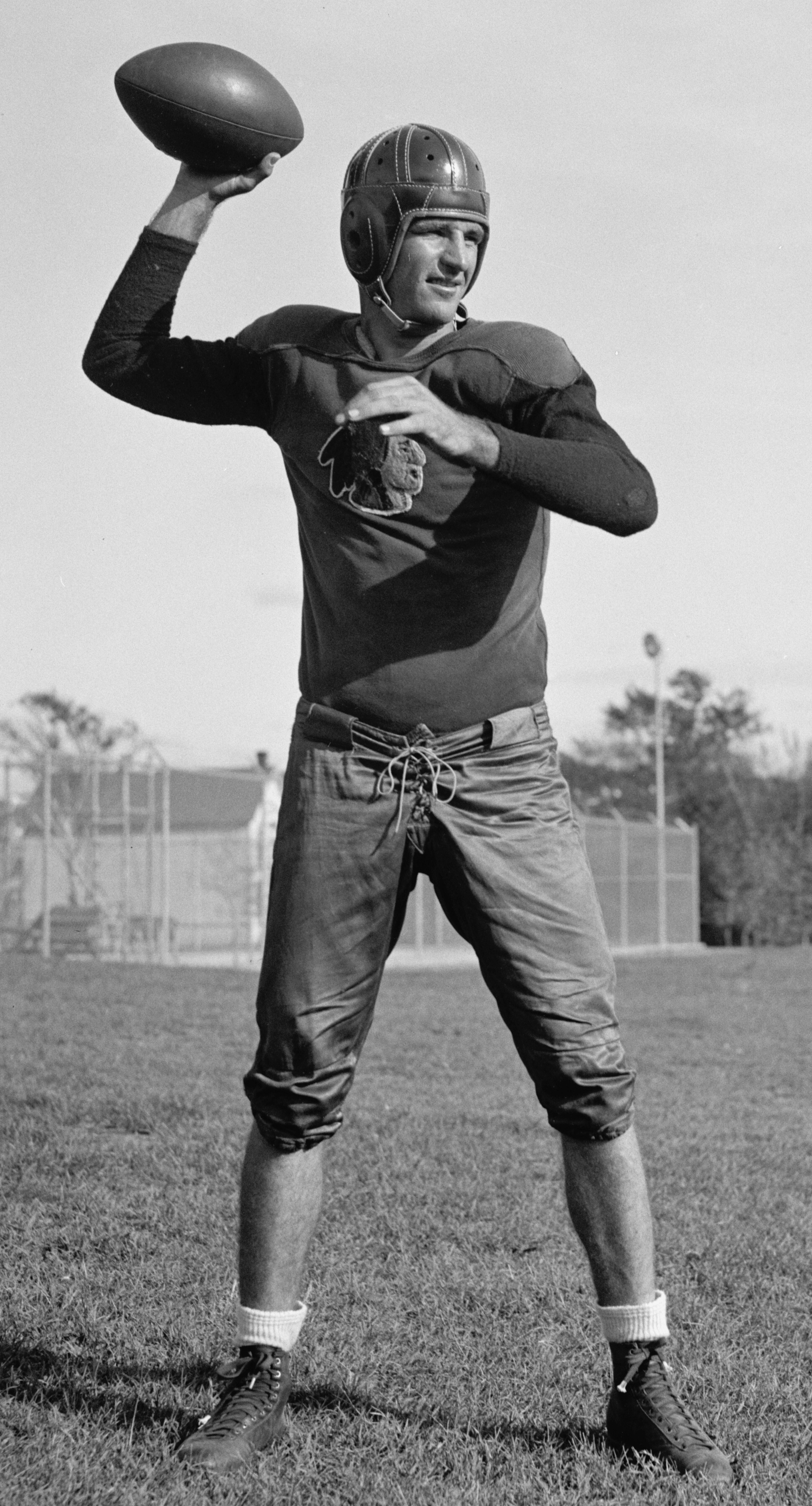
- Baugh with the Washington Redskins in 1937

No. 33
- Positions: Quarterback, punter, safety

Personal information
- Born: March 17, 1914; Temple, Texas, U.S.
- Died: December 17, 2008 (aged 94); Rotan, Texas, U.S.
- Listed height: 6 ft 2 in (1.88 m)
- Listed weight: 182 lb (83 kg)

Career information
- High school: Sweetwater (Sweetwater, Texas)
- College: TCU (1934–1936)
- NFL draft: 1937: 1st round, 6th overall pick

Career history

Playing
- Washington Redskins (1937–1952)

Coaching
- Hardin–Simmons Cowboys (1955–1959) Head coach; New York Titans (1960–1961) Head coach; Oklahoma State Cowboys football (1962) Freshman coach; Tulsa Golden Hurricane (1963) Assistant coach; Houston Oilers (1964) Head coach

Awards and highlights
- 2× NFL champion (1937, 1942); 4× First-team All-Pro (1937, 1940, 1942, 1943); 4× Second-team All-Pro (1938, 1941, 1947, 1948); 6× Pro Bowl (1938–1942, 1951); 4× NFL passing yards leader (1937, 1940, 1947, 1948); 2× NFL passing touchdowns leader (1940, 1947); 3× NFL passer rating leader (1940, 1945, 1947); 8× NFL completion percentage leader (1940, 1942, 1943, 1945–1949); NFL interceptions leader (1943); NFL punting yards leader (1943); NFL 1940s All-Decade Team; NFL 75th Anniversary All-Time Team; NFL 100th Anniversary All-Time Team; Washington Commanders 90 Greatest; Washington Commanders Ring of Fame; Washington Commanders No. 33 retired; CFB national champion (1935); TCU Horned Frogs No. 45 retired; Consensus All-American (1936); First-team All-American (1935); 2× first-team All-SWC (1935, 1936)

Career NFL statistics
- Passing attempts: 2,995
- Passing completions: 1,693
- Completion percentage: 56.5%
- TD–INT: 187–203
- Passing yards: 21,886
- Passer rating: 72.2
- Punting yards: 15,245
- Punting average: 45.1
- Interceptions made: 31
- Stats at Pro Football Reference

Head coaching record
- Career: AFL: 18–24 (.429); College: 23–28 (.451)
- Coaching profile at Pro Football Reference
- Pro Football Hall of Fame
- College Football Hall of Fame

Samuel Adrian Baugh (March 17, 1914 – December 17, 2008) was an American professional football quarterback who played 16 seasons with the Washington Redskins of the National Football League (NFL). Baugh also played safety on defense and was the team's punter. He played college football for the TCU Horned Frogs, where he was a two time All-American prior to being selected by the Redskins in the first round of the 1937 NFL draft. With the Redskins, Baugh won NFL Championships in 1937 and 1942 and led the NFL in completion percentage eight times, passing yards four times, and passing touchdowns twice. In addition to being an outstanding quarterback, he led the NFL in punting average five times and in defensive interceptions with 11 in 1943.

After his playing career, he served as a college coach for the Hardin–Simmons Cowboys before coaching professionally for the New York Titans and Houston Oilers. Baugh was inducted into the Pro Football Hall of Fame in 1963 and was named to the NFL's 75th and 100th Anniversary All-Time teams.

== Early life ==
Baugh was born on March 17, 1914, in Temple, Texas, the second son of James, a worker on the Santa Fe Railroad, and Lucy Baugh. His parents later divorced and his mother raised the three children. When he was 16, the family then moved to Sweetwater, Texas, and he attended Sweetwater High School. As the quarterback of his high school football team (Sweetwater Mustangs), he practiced for hours throwing a football through a swinging automobile tire, often on the run. Baugh practiced punting more than throwing.

However, he really wanted to become a professional baseball player and almost received a scholarship to play at Washington State University. About a month before he started at Washington State, however, Baugh hurt his knee while sliding into second base during a game, and the scholarship fell through.

== College career ==
=== Football ===
After coach Dutch Meyer told him he could play three sports (football, baseball, and basketball), Baugh attended Texas Christian University. While at TCU, he threw 587 passes in his three varsity seasons for 39 touchdowns. Baugh was named an All-American in 1935 and 1936. He also led the Horned Frogs to two bowl game wins, a 3–2 victory over LSU in the 1936 Sugar Bowl, and a 16–6 victory over Marquette in the first annual Cotton Bowl Classic in 1937 after which he was named MVP. He finished fourth in voting for the Heisman Trophy in 1936.

In early 1936, Washington Redskins owner George Preston Marshall offered Baugh $4,000 to play for them. Originally unsure about playing professional football, he did not agree to the contract until after the College All-Star Game, where the team beat the Green Bay Packers 6–0.

=== Baseball ===
Baugh was also a baseball player at TCU, where he played third base. It was during his time as a baseball player that he earned the nickname "Slinging Sammy", which he got from a Texas sportswriter. After college, Baugh signed a contract with the St. Louis Cardinals and was sent to the minor leagues to play with the American Association Columbus Red Birds, after being converted to shortstop. He was then sent to the International League's Rochester, New York Red Wings, St. Louis's other top farm club. While there he received little playing time behind starting shortstop Marty Marion and was unhappy with his prospects. He then turned to professional football.

== Professional career ==
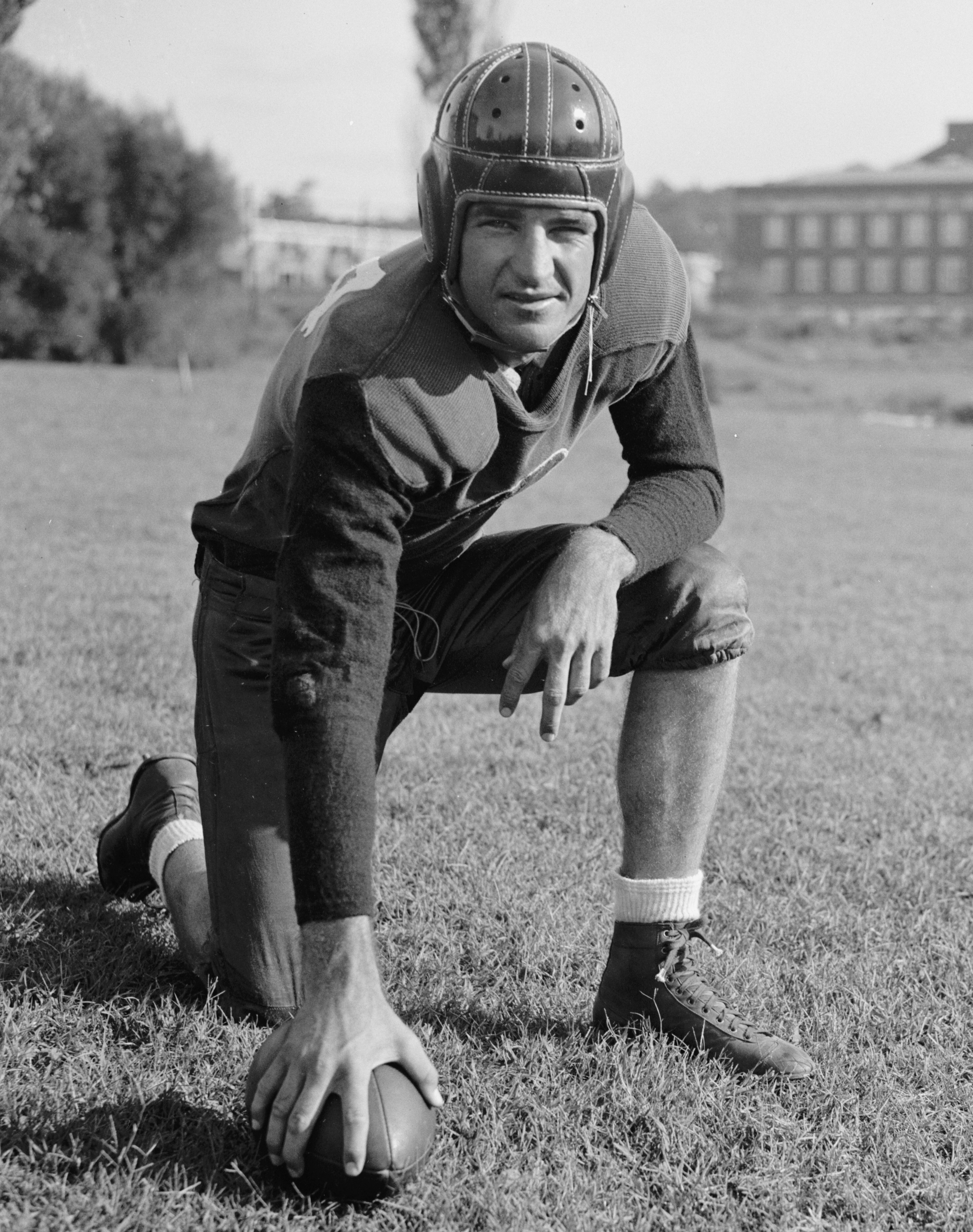
Baugh as a rookie with the Washington Redskins, 1937

As expected, Baugh was selected in the first round (sixth overall) of the 1937 NFL draft by the Washington Redskins, the same year the team moved from Boston. He signed a one-year contract with the Redskins and received $8,000, making him the highest-paid player on the team.

During his rookie season in 1937, Baugh played quarterback (although in Washington's formation he was officially lined up as a tailback or halfback until 1944), safety, and punter, set an NFL record for completions with 91 in 218 attempts and threw for a league-high 1,127 yards. He led the Redskins to the NFL Championship game against the Chicago Bears, where he finished 17 of 33 for 335 yards and his second-half touchdown passes of 55, 78 and 33 yards gave Washington a 28–21 victory. His 335 passing yards set the record for most in an NFL Championship Game and the most ever in a playoff game by any rookie quarterback in NFL history, with the former being broken by Johnny Unitas in the 1958 NFL Championship Game and the latter being broken by Russell Wilson in 2012. The Redskins and Bears met three times in championship games between 1940 and 1943. In the 1940 Championship game, the Bears recorded the most one-sided victory in NFL history, beating Washington 73–0. After the game, Baugh was asked what would have happened if the Redskins' first drive had resulted in a touchdown. He shrugged and replied: "What? The score would have been 73–7".

Baugh's heyday came during World War II. In 1942, Baugh and the Redskins won the East Conference with a 10–1 record. In the 1942 Championship game, Baugh threw a touchdown pass and kept the Bears in their own territory with some strong punts, including an 85-yard quick kick, and Washington won 14–6.

"I didn't know how much pro players were making, but I thought they were
making pretty good money. So I asked Mr. Marshall for $8,000, and I finally
got it. Later I felt like a robber when I found out what Cliff Battles and some
of those other good players were making. I'll tell you what the highest-priced
boy in Washington was getting the year before—not half as much as $8,000!
Three of them—Cliff Battles, Turk Edwards and Wayne Millner—got peanuts,
and all of 'em in the Hall of Fame now. If I had known what they were getting
I'd have never asked for $8,000."

— Baugh, on his $8,000 salary.

Baugh had what many consider to be the greatest single season performance by a pro football player during 1943 in which he led the league in pass completions, punting (45.9-yard average) and interceptions (11). One of Baugh's more memorable single-game performances during the season was when he threw four touchdown passes and intercepted four passes in a 42–20 victory over the Lions. He was selected as an All-Pro tailback that year. The Redskins again made it to the championship game, but lost to the Bears 41–21. During the game, Baugh suffered a concussion while tackling Bears quarterback Sid Luckman and had to leave.

During the 1945 season, Baugh completed 128 of 182 passes for a 70.33 completion percentage, which was an NFL record that lasted until being broken by Ken Anderson in 1982. He threw 11 touchdown passes and only four interceptions. The Redskins again won the East Conference but lost 15–14 in the 1945 Championship game against the Cleveland Rams. The one-point margin of victory came under scrutiny because of a safety that occurred early in the game. In the first quarter, the Redskins had the ball at their own 5-yard line. Dropping back into the end zone, Baugh threw to an open receiver, but the ball hit the goal post (which at the time was on the goal line instead of at the back of the end zone) and bounced back to the ground in the end zone. Under the rules at the time, this was ruled as a safety and thus gave the Rams a 2–0 lead. It was that safety that proved to be the margin of victory. Owner Marshall was so angry at the outcome that he became a major force in passing the following major rule change after the season: A forward pass that strikes the goal posts is automatically ruled incomplete. This later became known as the "Baugh/Marshall Rule".

"The best, as far as I'm concerned. He could not only throw the ball, he
could play defense, he could punt the football, he ran it when he had to.
He and I roomed together, and he was a football man. He knew football,
played it, and everybody had a lot of confidence in him."

— Bill Dudley, on Sammy Baugh.

One of Baugh's more memorable single performances came on "Sammy Baugh Day" on November 23, 1947. That day, the Washington D.C. Touchdown Club honored him at Griffith Stadium and gave him a station wagon. Against the Chicago Cardinals he passed for 355 yards and six touchdowns. That season, the Redskins finished 4–8, but Baugh had career highs in completions (210), attempts (354), yards (2,938) and touchdown passes (25), leading the league in all four categories.

Baugh played for five more years leading the league in completion percentage for the sixth and seventh times in 1948 and 1949. He then retired after the 1952 season. In his final game, a 27–21 win over Philadelphia at Griffith Stadium, he played for several minutes before retiring to a prolonged standing ovation from the crowd. Baugh won numerous NFL passing titles and earned first-team All-NFL honors four times in his career. He completed 1,693 of 2,995 passes for 21,886 yards.

=== Records ===
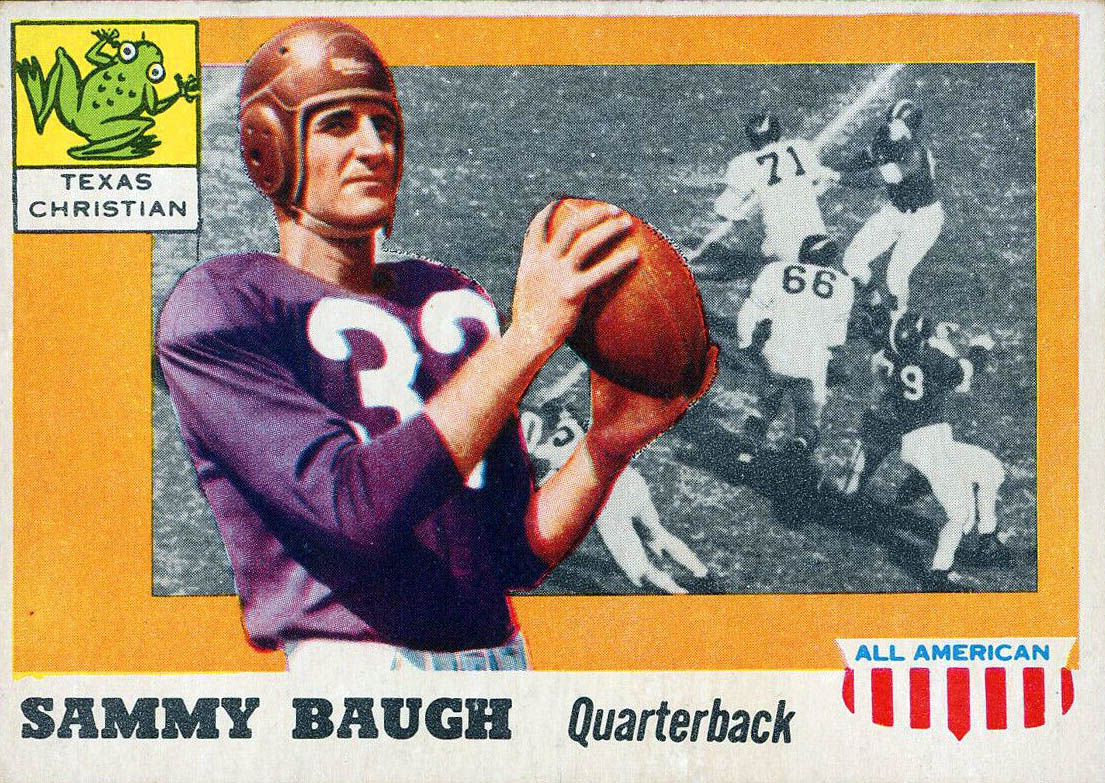
1955 Topps trading card of Baugh

By the time he retired, Baugh set 13 NFL records in three player positions: quarterback, punter, and safety. He is considered one of the all-time great football players. He gave birth to the fanaticism of Redskins fans. As Michael Wilbon of The Washington Post says: "He brought not just victories but thrills and ignited Washington with a passion even the worst Redskins periods can barely diminish". He was the first to play the position of quarterback as it is played today, the first to make of the forward pass an effective weapon rather than an "act of desperation".

Two of his records as quarterback still stand: most seasons leading the league in passing (six; tied with Steve Young) and most seasons leading the league with the lowest interception percentage (five). He is also top 20 all-time in highest single-season completion percentage (70.33), he has the most seasons leading the league in yards gained (four) and most seasons leading the league in completion percentage (seven).

As a punter, Baugh retired with the NFL record for highest punting average in a career (45.1 yards), and is still second all-time (only Shane Lechler has passed him with 46.5 yards), and has the second-best (51.4 in 1940) and fifth-best (48.7 in 1941) season marks. He led the league in punting from 1940 through 1943. His single-season record of 51.4 average yards per punt during the 1940 season was held for 82 seasons until Titans rookie punter Ryan Stonehouse broke it with a 53.1 average in the 2022 season.

As a safety, he was the first player in league history to intercept four passes in a game (in 1943; a record that has since been tied but not surpassed), and he is the only player to lead the league in passing, punting, and interceptions in the same season (also 1943).

As one of the best-known of the early NFL quarterbacks, Baugh is likely to be compared to more recent great players. As noted by Michael Wilbon in The Washington Post, the football of Baugh's era was rounder at the ends and fatter in the middle than the one used today, making it far more difficult to pass well (or even to create a proper spiral). Additionally, it is important to point out that the rules for both pass-interference and for protecting quarterbacks have intensified dramatically, resulting in inflating modern quarterbacks' statistics.

== Coaching career ==
While playing for the Redskins, Baugh and teammate Wayne Millner were assistant coaches for the Catholic University Cardinals, and went with them to the 1940 Sun Bowl. Baugh left Washington, D.C. in 1952. He chose not to return for Redskins team functions, despite repeated organization invitations. After his playing career, he became head football coach for the Hardin–Simmons Cowboys, where he compiled a 23–28 record between 1955 and 1959.

Baugh was the first coach of the New York Titans of the American Football League (AFL) in 1960 and 1961 compiling a record of 14–14. He was an assistant for the Tulsa Golden Hurricane in 1963 under head coach Glenn Dobbs. At Tulsa, he coached All-American quarterback Jerry Rhome. In 1964, Baugh coached the Houston Oilers and went 4–10.

== Career statistics ==
=== Playing career ===
==== NFL ====
Legend
	NFL Player of the Year
	Won the NFL championship
	Led the league
**Bold**	Career high

Regular season

Year	Team	Games		Passing											Punting					Interceptions				
Year	Team	GP	GS	Cmp	Att	Pct	Yds	Y/A	Lng	TD	Int	TD%	Int%	Rtg	Pnt	Yds	Y/P	Lng	Blck	Int	Yds	Y/I	Lng	TD
1937	WAS	11	5	81	171	47.4	1,127	6.6	59	8	14	4.7	8.2	50.5	0	0	—	0	0	0	0	—	0	0
1938	WAS	9	3	63	128	49.2	853	6.7	60	5	11	3.9	8.6	48.1	0	0	—	0	0	0	0	—	0	0
1939	WAS	9	1	53	96	55.2	518	5.4	44	6	9	6.3	9.4	52.3	26	998	38.4	69	1	0	0	—	0	0
1940	WAS	11	11	111	177	62.7	1,367	7.7	81	12	10	6.8	5.6	85.6	35	1,799	**51.4**	**85**	1	3	84	28.0	44	0
1941	WAS	11	1	106	193	54.9	1,236	6.4	55	10	19	5.2	9.8	52.2	30	1,462	48.7	75	0	4	83	20.8	35	0
1942	WAS	11	8	132	225	58.7	1,524	6.8	53	16	11	7.1	4.9	82.5	37	1,785	48.2	74	0	5	77	15.4	29	0
1943	WAS	10	7	133	239	55.6	1,754	7.3	72	23	19	**9.6**	7.9	78.0	**50**	**2,295**	45.9	81	**3**	**11**	112	10.2	23	0
1944	WAS	8	4	82	146	56.2	849	5.8	71	4	8	2.7	5.5	59.4	44	1,787	40.6	76	1	4	21	5.3	18	0
1945	WAS	10	10	128	182	**70.3**	1,669	**9.2**	70	11	4	6.0	2.2	**109.9**	33	1,429	43.3	57	0	4	**114**	**28.5**	**74**	0
1946	WAS	11	2	87	161	54.0	1,163	7.2	51	8	17	5.0	10.6	54.2	33	1,488	45.1	60	0	0	0	—	0	0
1947	WAS	12	1	**210**	**354**	59.3	**2,938**	8.3	74	**25**	15	7.1	4.2	92.0	35	1,528	43.7	67	2	0	0	—	0	0
1948	WAS	12	3	185	315	58.7	2,599	8.3	**86**	22	**23**	7.0	7.3	78.3	0	0	—	0	0	0	0	—	0	0
1949	WAS	12	9	145	255	56.9	1,903	7.5	76	18	14	7.1	5.5	81.2	1	53	53.0	53	0	0	0	—	0	0
1950	WAS	11	7	90	166	54.2	1,130	6.8	56	10	11	6.0	6.6	68.1	9	352	39.1	58	1	0	0	—	0	0
1951	WAS	12	9	67	154	43.5	1,104	7.2	53	7	17	4.5	**11.0**	43.8	4	221	55.3	53	0	0	0	—	0	0
1952	WAS	7	5	20	33	60.6	152	4.6	20	2	1	6.1	3.0	79.4	1	48	48.0	48	0	0	0	—	0	0
Career		167	86	1,693	2,995	56.5	21,886	7.3	86	187	203	6.2	6.8	72.2	338	15,245	45.1	85	9	31	491	15.8	74	0

Postseason

Year	Team	Games		Passing											Punting					Interceptions				
Year	Team	GP	GS	Cmp	Att	Pct	Yds	Y/A	Lng	TD	Int	TD%	Int%	Rtg	Pnt	Yds	Y/P	Lng	Blck	Int	Yds	Y/I	Lng	TD
1937	WAS	1	1	18	**33**	54.5	**335**	**10.2**	**78**	**3**	1	**9.1**	3.0	**107.5**	5	132	26.4	43	0	0	0	—	0	0
1940	WAS	1	1	10	17	58.8	102	6.0	50	0	2	0.0	11.8	36.5	1	29	29.0	29	0	0	0	—	0	0
1942	WAS	1	1	5	13	38.5	65	5.0	38	1	2	7.7	**15.4**	41.0	**6**	**315**	**52.5**	61	0	1	0	0.0	0	0
1943	WAS	2	0	**24**	**33**	**72.7**	322	9.8	31	**3**	**3**	**9.1**	9.1	95.8	**6**	243	40.5	**66**	0	**2**	**48**	**24.0**	**28**	0
1945	WAS	1	0	1	6	16.7	7	1.2	7	0	0	0.0	0.0	39.6	2	65	32.5	—	0	0	0	—	0	0
Career		6	3	58	102	56.9	831	8.1	78	7	8	6.9	7.8	73.6	20	784	39.2	66	0	3	48	16.0	28	0

==== College ====
Year	Passing				
Year	Cmp	Att	Pct	Yds	TD
1934	69	171	40.4	883	10
1935	97	210	46.2	1,241	18
1936	104	206	50.5	1,196	12
Career	270	587	46.0	3,320	40

=== Head coaching record ===
==== College ====
Year	Team	Overall	Conference	Standing	Bowl/playoffs
**Hardin–Simmons Cowboys** (Border Conference) (1955–1959)
1955	Hardin–Simmons	5–5	3–2	3rd	
1956	Hardin–Simmons	4–6	1–3	5th	
1957	Hardin–Simmons	5–5	3–2	T–3rd	
1958	Hardin–Simmons	6–5	4–0	1st	**L** Sun
1959	Hardin–Simmons	3–7	2–2	T–3rd	
Hardin–Simmons:		23–28	13–9		
Total:		23–28			
National championship Conference title Conference division title or championship game berth

==== AFL ====
Team	Year	Regular season					Postseason			
Team	Year	Won	Lost	Ties	Win %	Finish	Won	Lost	Win %	Result
NYT	1960	7	7	0	.500	2nd in AFL East	-	-	-	
NYT	1961	7	7	0	.500	3rd in AFL East	-	-	-	
HOU	1964	4	10	0	.286	4th in AFL East	-	-	-	
NY Total		14	14	0	.500					
HOU Total		4	10	0	.286					
Total		18	24	0	.429					

== Awards and honors ==
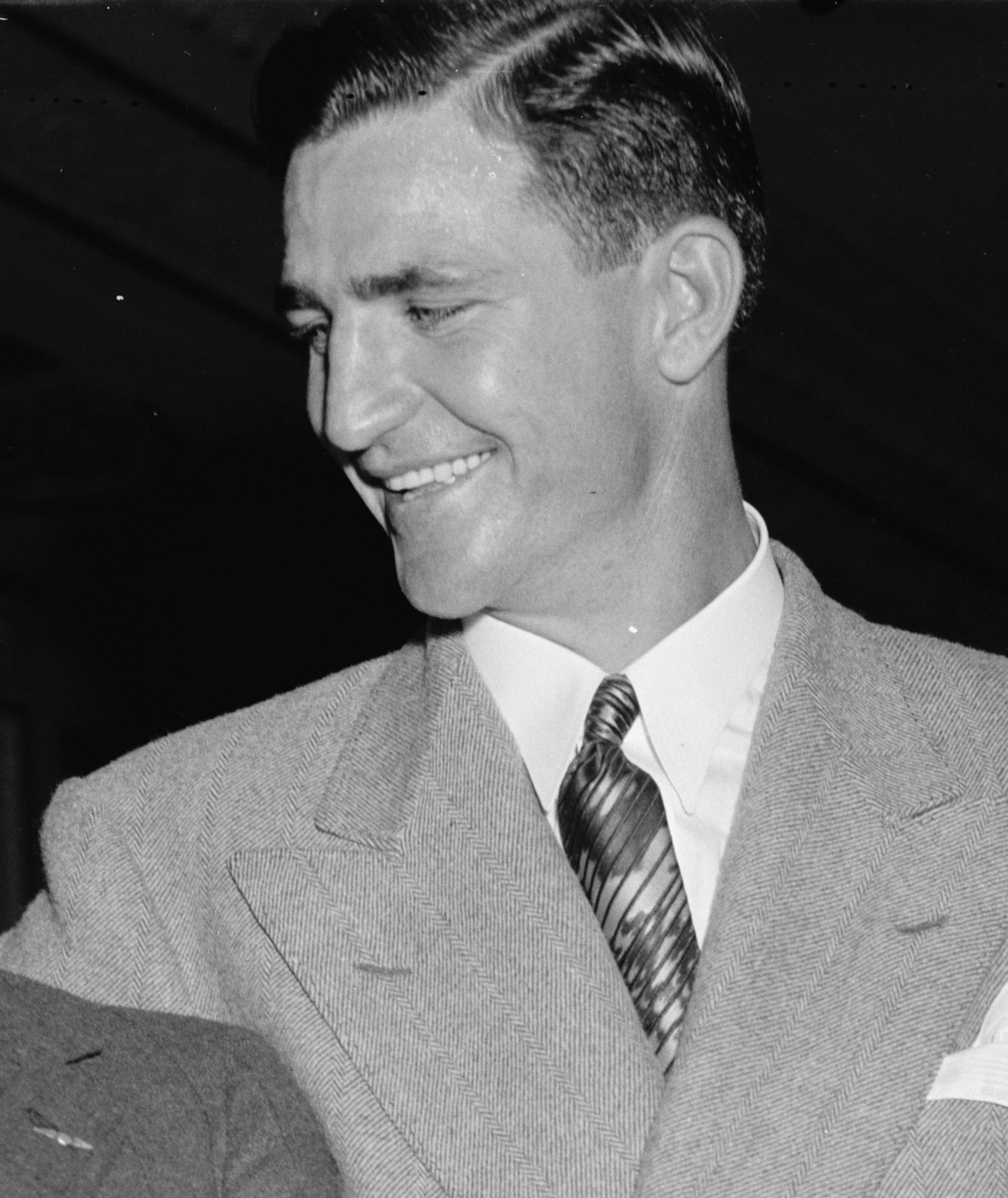
Baugh in 1938

NFL

- 2× NFL champion (1937, 1942)
- 4× First-team All-Pro (1937, 1940, 1942, 1943)
- 4× Second-team All-Pro (1938, 1941, 1947, 1948)
- 6× Pro Bowl (1938–1942, 1951)
- 4× NFL passing yards leader (1937, 1940, 1947, 1948)
- 2× NFL passing touchdowns leader (1940, 1947)
- 3× NFL passer rating leader (1940, 1945, 1947)
- 8× NFL completion percentage leader (1940, 1942, 1943, 1945–1949)
- NFL interceptions leader (1943)
- NFL punting yards leader (1943)
- NFL 1940s All-Decade Team
- NFL 50th Anniversary All-Time Team runner-up (1969)
- NFL 75th Anniversary All-Time Team (1994)
- NFL 100th Anniversary All-Time Team (2019)
- Washington Commanders 90 Greatest
- Washington Commanders Ring of Fame
- Washington Commanders No. 33 retired
- Pro Football Hall of Fame (1963)
- Named the most versatile player of all time by the NFL Network (2007)
- 3rd greatest NFL player and 43rd greatest athlete of the 20th century by the Associated Press (1999)
- 11th greatest NFL player of the 20th century by The Sporting News (1999) (highest-ranking player for the Redskins)
- 14th greatest NFL player of all time by NFL Network/NFL Films (2010)

College

- CFB national champion (1935)
- TCU Horned Frogs No. 45 retired
- Consensus All-American (1936)
- First-team All-American (1935)
- 2× first-team All-SWC (1935, 1936)
- All-Century college football team Sports Illustrated (1999).
- 4th greatest college football player by SPORT magazine (1999)

Other

- 64th greatest athlete of the 20th century by ESPN (1999)
- #21 retired at Sweetwater High School.
- A street in his hometown of Rotan, Texas, is named after him.
- Had a children's home in Jayton, Kent County, Texas named in his honor.
- TCU's indoor practice facility is named after him.

== Acting ==
Baugh also took up acting. In 1941, he made $6,400 for starring in a 12-week serial as a dark-haired Texas Ranger named Tom King. The serial, called King of the Texas Rangers, was released by Republic Studios. The episodes ran in theaters as Saturday matinees; it also starred Duncan Renaldo, later famous as TV's Cisco Kid.

Robert Duvall patterned the role of Gus McCrae in the television series Lonesome Dove after Baugh, particularly his arm movements, after visiting him at his home in Texas in 1988.

== Personal and later life ==
After retiring from football, Baugh and his wife Edmonia Smith Baugh moved to his Double Mountain ranch west of Aspermont, Texas, where they had four boys and a girl. Edmonia died in 1990, after 52 years of marriage to Baugh, who was her high school sweetheart. According to his son, Baugh derived far more pleasure from ranching than he ever had from football, saying that he enjoyed the game, but if he could live his life over again, he probably wouldn't play sports at all.

Similar to the nicknaming of fellow football great Byron "Whizzer" White of Colorado, sportswriters had tagged "Slinging Sammy". However, Sam was his preferred name for most of his life. He always introduced himself as Sam Baugh and signed his papers and autographs that way. TCU named its football practice facility the Sam Baugh Football Center with that perspective in mind.

Baugh's health began to decline after the death of his wife. During his last years, he lived in a nursing home in a little West Texas town called Jayton, not far from Double Mountain Ranch. The ranch is now in the hands of Baugh's son David and is still a cow-calf operation, on 20,000 acres (81 km^{2}).

=== Death ===
The Associated Press quoted Baugh's son on December 17, 2008, saying Baugh had died after numerous health issues, including Alzheimer's disease, at Fisher County Hospital in Rotan, Texas. He is interred at Belvieu Cemetery in Rotan.

== See also ==
- List of NCAA major college football yearly passing leaders
- List of NCAA major college football yearly total offense leaders
