= 1937 NFL season =

American football season

Regular season
- Duration: September 5 – December 12, 1937
- East Champions: Washington Redskins
- West Champions: Chicago Bears

Championship Game
- Champions: Washington Redskins

NFL teams: West, East

The 1937 NFL season was the 18th regular season of the National Football League. The Cleveland Rams joined the league as an expansion team. Meanwhile, the Redskins relocated from Boston to Washington, D.C.

The season ended when the Redskins, led by rookie quarterback Sammy Baugh, defeated the Chicago Bears in the NFL Championship Game.

== Draft ==
The 1937 NFL draft was held on December 12, 1936, at New York City's Hotel Lincoln. With the first pick, the Philadelphia Eagles selected runningback Sam Francis from the University of Nebraska–Lincoln.

== Major rule changes ==
- All players are required to wear numerals on their jerseys whose color must be in sharp contrast with the jersey color. The numbers on the front must be at least 6 inches (150 mm) while the ones on the back must be at least 8 inches (200 mm).
- If a kickoff goes out of bounds, the ball is put in play either on the opponent's 35-yard line or 10 yards from the spot where it crossed the sideline.
- The penalty for an illegal forward pass that is thrown beyond the line of scrimmage is a loss of down and five yards from the spot of the foul.

== Division races ==
Midway through the NFL's 11-game season, the Bears were unbeaten (5–0) in the Western Division, while the Giants were leaders in the Eastern (4–1), and they played to a 3–3 tie. The Giants and Bears continued to stay in the lead in their divisions, and the Bears clinched a spot in the title game with its 13–0 win over Detroit. On December 5, 1937, the final game of the season had Washington (7–3 and .700) traveling to New York (6–2–2 and .750). A win or a tie would give the Giants the Eastern title; the Redskins triumphed, 49–14, and got the division crown and the trip to face Chicago in the 1937 championship game.

== Final standings ==
NFL Eastern Division
	W	L	T	PCT	DIV	PF	PA	STK
Washington Redskins	8	3	0	.727	6–2	195	120	W2
New York Giants	6	3	2	.667	5–2–1	128	109	L1
Pittsburgh Pirates	4	7	0	.364	4–4	122	145	L1
Brooklyn Dodgers	3	7	1	.300	2–5–1	82	174	T1
Philadelphia Eagles	2	8	1	.200	2–6	86	177	L1

Note: Tie games were not officially counted in the standings until 1972.

NFL Western Division
	W	L	T	PCT	DIV	PF	PA	STK
Chicago Bears	9	1	1	.900	7–1	201	100	W4
Green Bay Packers	7	4	0	.636	6–2	220	122	L2
Detroit Lions	7	4	0	.636	4–4	180	105	L1
Chicago Cardinals	5	5	1	.500	3–5	135	165	L2
Cleveland Rams	1	10	0	.091	0–8	75	207	L9

== NFL Championship Game ==
Washington 28, Chi. Bears 21, at Wrigley Field, Chicago, December 12, 1937

== League leaders ==
Statistic	Name	Team	Yards
Passing	Sammy Baugh	Washington	1127
Rushing	Cliff Battles	Washington	874
Receiving	Gaynell Tinsley	Chicago Cardinals	675

== Coaching changes ==
- Brooklyn Dodgers: Paul J. Schissler was replaced by Potsy Clark.
- Cleveland Rams: The team joined the NFL, hiring Hugo Bezdek as head coach.
- Detroit Lions: George Clark was replaced by Dutch Clark.
- Pittsburgh Pirates: Joe Bach was replaced by Johnny Blood.

== Stadium changes ==
- The Cleveland Rams split their home games between Cleveland Municipal Stadium and League Park
- The relocated Washington Redskins relocated from Boston's Fenway Park to Griffith Stadium in Washington, D.C.

== See also ==
- 1937 American Football League season
