= 1936 All-Pacific Coast football team =

American all-star college football team

The 1936 All-Pacific Coast football team consists of American football players chosen by various organizations for All-Pacific Coast teams for the 1936 college football season.

The 1936 Washington Huskies football team won the Pacific Coast Conference championship with a 7-2-1 record, finished the season ranked #5 in the country, and had four players who were selected to the All-Pacific Coast first team. The Washington honorees were halfbacks Byron Haines and Jimmie Cain, tackle Chuck Bond, and guard Max Starcevich.

The Santa Clara Broncos were "the only undefeated, untied team in the country" in 1936, were ranked #6 in the final AP Poll, and then defeated the #2-ranked LSU in the 1937 Sugar Bowl. Santa Clara landed two players on one or more of the All-Pacific Coast teams. Fullback Nello Falaschi was a first-team selection by the INS and UP and was later inducted into the College Football Hall of Fame. Guard Dick Bassi was a first-team pick by the AP, INS and UP.

== All-Pacific Coast selections ==
=== Quarterback ===
- Ed Goddard, Washington State (AP-1; INS-1; UP-1)
- Johnny Meek, California (AP-3)

=== Halfbacks ===
- Byron Haines, Washington (AP-1; INS-1; UP-1)
- Jimmie Cain, Washington (AP-1; INS-1)
- Joe Gray, Oregon State (AP-2)
- Milt Popovich, Montana (AP-2)
- Jim Coffis, Stanford (AP-3)
- Vic Bottari, California (AP-3)

=== Fullback ===
- Nello Falaschi, Santa Clara (AP-2; INS-1; UP-1) (College Football Hall of Fame)
- George Karamatic, Gonzaga (AP-1 [fullback]; UP-1 [halfback])
- Billy Bob Williams, UCLA (AP-2)
- Dick Weisgerber, Willamette (AP-3)

=== Ends ===
- Jack Clark, Stanford (AP-1; INS-1; UP-1)
- Gene Hibbs, USC (AP-1; INS-1; UP-1)
- Peters, Washington (AP-2)
- Floyd Terry, Washington State (AP-2)
- Bob Schroeder, UCLA (AP-3)
- Finney, Santa Clara (AP-3)

=== Tackles ===
- Chuck Bond, Washington (AP-1; INS-1; UP-1)
- Del Bjork, Oregon (AP-1; INS-1; UP-1)
- Jerry Dennerlein, St. Mary's (AP-2)
- Pete Zagar, Stanford (AP-2)
- Dwight Scheyer, Washington State (AP-3)
- Vic Markov, Washington (AP-3)

=== Guards ===
- Dick Bassi, Santa Clara (AP-1; INS-1; UP-1)
- Max Starcevich, Washington (AP-1; INS-1; UP-1) (College Football Hall of Fame)
- Ed Strack, Oregon State (AP-2)
- Gil Kuhn, USC (AP-2)
- Martin Kordick, St. Mary's (AP-3)
- Al Hoptowit, Washington State (AP-3)

=== Centers ===
- Bob Herwig, California (AP-1; INS-1; UP-1) (College Football Hall of Fame)
- Phil Dougherty, Santa Clara (AP-2)
- John Wiatrak, Washington (AP-3)

== Key ==
AP = Associated Press

INS = International News Service

UP = United Press, "the choice of editors in six states in one of the most comprehensive ballots ever conducted in the west"

Bold = Consensus first-team selection by the AP, INS and UP

== See also ==
- 1936 College Football All-America Team
