= Joseph Delaney (disambiguation) =

Joseph Delaney (1945–2022), English author

Joseph or Joe Delaney may also refer to:

- Joseph Delaney (artist) (1904–1991), American painter
- Joseph H. Delaney (1932–1999), American lawyer and science fiction writer
- Joseph Patrick Delaney (1934–2005), American Roman Catholic bishop
- Joe Delaney (1958–1983), American National Football League player
- Joe Delaney (snooker player) (born 1972), Irish professional snooker player
- Joe Delaney (tackle) (1917–2002), American football player
