= 1937 Little All-America college football team =

American college football all-star team

The 1937 Little All-America college football team is composed of college football players from small colleges and universities who were selected by the Associated Press (AP) as the best players at each position. For 1937, the AP did not select a second team but instead chose multiple players for "honorable mention" at each position. The AP also tightened its Little All-America classification, limiting the selections to players at schools with enrollment of not more than 1,000 boys and a football schedule "largely confined to colleges of the same class."

== Selections ==
Position	Player	Team
QB	Burns McKinney	Hardin–Simmons
HB	Dick Riffle	Albright
HB	Wendell Butcher	Gustavus Adolphus
FB	Clay Calhoun	Loyola–New Orleans
E	Harry Kline	Kansas State Teachers
E	William Smith	Marshall
T	Wayne Goddard	Cape Girardeau
T	Walter Riddle	Birmingham–Southern
G	Elmer Cochran	Murray State
G	Doug Oldershaw	Santa Barbara State
C	Wallace Johnson	Austin

== See also ==
- 1937 College Football All-America Team
