= List of Gonzaga Bulldogs in the NFL draft =

This is a list of Gonzaga Bulldogs football players in the NFL draft.

== Key ==
B	Back	K	Kicker	NT	Nose tackle
C	Center	LB	Linebacker	FB	Fullback
DB	Defensive back	P	Punter	HB	Halfback
DE	Defensive end	QB	Quarterback	WR	Wide receiver
DT	Defensive tackle	RB	Running back	G	Guard
E	End	T	Offensive tackle	TE	Tight end

= Pro Bowler
= Hall of Famer

== Selections ==
Year	Round	Pick	Player	Team	Position
1938	1	8	George Karamatic	New York Giants	B
1940	18	162	Seaton Daly	Pittsburgh Steelers	T
1940	18	167	Ralph Schlosser	Chicago Bears	C
1941	9	77	Tony Canadeo	Green Bay Packers	RB
1942	20	190	Bill Tessendorf	Chicago Bears	T
