= Dennerlein =

Dennerlein is a German surname. Notable people with the surname include:

- Barbara Dennerlein (born 1964), German hard bop, post-bop, and jazz organist
- Fritz Dennerlein (1936–1992), Italian swimmer
- Jerry Dennerlein (1915–1966), American football player
