= 1937 All-Eastern football team =

American all-star college football team

The 1937 All-Eastern football team consists of American football players chosen by various selectors as the best players at each position among the Eastern colleges and universities during the 1937 college football season.

== All-Eastern selections ==
=== Quarterbacks ===
- Clint Frank, Yale (AP-1, NEA-1 [b], AK, PW [hb])
- Dick Riffle, Albright (AP-2, NEA-3)
- Harry Clarke, West Virginia (NEA-2)

=== Halfbacks ===
- Marshall Goldberg, Pittsburgh (AP-1, NEA-1 [b], AK, PW)
- Sid Luckman, Columbia (AP-1, NEA-1 [b], AK, PW)
- Harold Stebbins, Pittsburgh (AP-2)
- Bob MacLeod, Dartmouth (AP-2, NEA-2)
- Renzo, Villanova (NEA-2)
- Ingram, Navy (NEA-3)
- Bill Hutchinson, Dartmouth (NEA-3)

=== Fullbacks ===
- Bill Osmanski, Holy Cross (AP-1, NEA-1 [b], AK)
- Dave Colwell, Yale (PW, NEA-3)
- Vernon Struck, Harvard (AP-2, NEA-2)

=== Ends ===
- Jerome H. Holland, Cornell (AP-1, NEA-2, AK, PW)
- John Wysocki, Villanova (AP-1, NEA-1)
- Merrill Davis, Dartmouth (AP-2, NEA-1)
- Frank Souchak, Pittsburgh (AP-2, NEA-2, AK, PW)
- Hoxton, Yale (NEA-3)
- Jack Daly, Manhattan (NEA-3)

=== Tackles ===
- Tony Matisi, Pittsburgh (AP-1, NEA-1, AK, PW)
- Al Babartsky, Fordham (AP-2, AK, PW)
- Ed Franco, Fordham (AP-1, NEA-1, AK [g], PW [g])
- John Mellus, Villanova (AP-2)
- Alex Kevorkian, Harvard (NEA-2)
- Francis Schildgen, Dartmouth (NEA-2)
- Red Chesbro, Colgate (NEA-3)
- Charles Toll, Princeton (NEA-3)

=== Guards ===
- Albin Lezouski, Pittsburgh (AP-1, NEA-3)
- Gus Zitrides, Dartmouth (AP-1)
- Elliot Hooper, Cornell (NEA-1)
- Ray DuBois, Navy (NEA-1)
- Bob McNamara, Penn (AP-2, NEA-2, AK)
- Johnny Nee, Harvard (PW)
- Sid Roth, Cornell (AP-2)
- John Economos, Penn State (NEA-2)
- Carr, Holy Cross (NEA-3)

=== Centers ===
- Alex Wojciechowicz, Fordham (AP-1, NEA-1, AK, PW)
- Franklin Hartline, Army (AP-2)
- Jim Gallagher, Yale (NEA-2)
- John Quigg, Lafayette (NEA-3)

== Key ==
- AP = Associated Press
- NEA = Newspaper Enterprise Association
- AK = Andrew Kerr
- PW = Pop Warner

== See also ==
- 1937 College Football All-America Team
