= Bill Daddio =

American football player, coach, and scout (1916–1989)

Biographical details
- Born: April 26, 1916; Meadville, Pennsylvania, U.S.
- Died: July 5, 1989 (aged 73); Mt. Lebanon, Pennsylvania, U.S.

Playing career
- 1936–1938: Pittsburgh
- 1941–1942: Chicago Cardinals
- 1945: Fleet City
- 1946: Buffalo Bisons
- Positions: End, kicker

Coaching career (HC unless noted)
- 1939: Pittsburgh (ends)
- 1947–1951: Allegheny
- 1952: Chicago Cardinals (line)
- 1954–1958: Purdue (assistant)
- 1959: Notre Dame (ends)

Administrative career (AD unless noted)
- ?: Philadelphia Eagles (personnel)
- 1969–1987: Denver Broncos (scout)

Head coaching record
- Overall: 14–18–5

Accomplishments and honors

Championships
- National (1937)

Awards
- 2× First-team All-American (1937, 1938); Third-team All-American (1936); 2× First-team All-Eastern (1936, 1938)

Louis William Daddio (April 26, 1916 – July 5, 1989) was an American football player, coach, and scout. He was an All-American at end at the University of Pittsburgh and played with the Chicago Cardinals of the National Football League (NFL) from 1941 to 1942 and the Buffalo Bisons of the All-America Football Conference (AAFC) in 1946. Daddio served as the head football coach at Allegheny College from 1947 to 1951, compiling a record of 14–18–5. He was later an assistant football coach at Purdue University and the University of Notre Dame and a personnel director for the Philadelphia Eagles. From 1969 until his retirement in 1987, he worked as a scout for the Denver Broncos.

== Playing career and military service ==
Daddio was an All-State performer at Meadville High School in Meadville, Pennsylvania. After a successful high school career, he moved to the University of Pittsburgh to play under coach Jock Sutherland. Daddio led the Panthers in receiving during the 1936 season. In each of his final two seasons at Pitt, 1937 and 1938, he was recognized as an All-American. During the 1937 Rose Bowl against the Washington Huskies, Daddio contributed significantly in the run game and returned an interception 71 yards in the fourth quarter to secure a victory for the Panthers. In 1953, Daddio retroactively received the Rose Bowl Player of the Game Award for the 1937 contest in Pasadena. In 1992, Daddio was inducted into the Rose Bowl Hall of Fame.

Daddio was selected by the Chicago Cardinals in the fifth round of the 1939 NFL draft, rejoining former Pitt teammate Marshall "Biggie" Goldberg. He played two seasons with the Cardinals. His versatile play earned him second-team All-Pro honors in 1942.

Daddio spent over two years with the United States Navy during World War II as a gunnery officer. For his service overseas, he was honored with the Bronze Star. Daddio's final of year of professional football came in 1946 as a player-coach with the Buffalo Bisons of the All-America Football Conference. He converted on all three extra points that he attempted that season.

== Coaching and scouting career ==
Daddio was the head football coach at Allegheny College in Meadville, Pennsylvania. He held that position for five seasons, from 1947 until 1951. His coaching record at Allegheny was 14–18–5. Following his stint at Allegheny, Daddio took a position under Stu Holcomb at Purdue University and continued there under Jack Mollenkopf until 1958. In 1969, Daddio became a scout with the Denver Broncos.

== Death ==
Daddio died of a heart attack at the age of 73 on July 5, 1989, at St. Clair Memorial Hospital in Mt. Lebanon, Pennsylvania.

== Head coaching record ==
Year	Team	Overall	Conference	Standing	Bowl/playoffs
Allegheny Gators (Independent) (1947–1951)
1947	Allegheny	1–4–2			
1948	Allegheny	6–1			
1949	Allegheny	4–3–1			
1950	Allegheny	2–4–1			
1951	Allegheny	1–6–1			
Allegheny:		14–18–5			
Total:		14–18–5			
