= Visions (convention) =

Doctor Who convention

- Status: Inactive
- Genre: Doctor Who, science fiction television
- Location: Rosemont, Illinois
- Country: United States
- Inaugurated: 1990
- Most recent: 1998
- Attendance: c. 1,100-2,200 each year
- Organizer: Her Majesty's Entertainment

Visions was an annual science fiction convention held from 1990 to 1998 in Rosemont, Illinois on Thanksgiving weekend. The convention was held at the Hyatt Regency O'Hare except for the 1992 event which was held at the Ramada O'Hare. The convention was originally called Visions but was renamed HME Visions in 1998. It was also known as "A British TV Celebration" before its first event.

The convention was founded by retired fireman, electrical contractor, and long-time Doctor Who fan Robert H. McLaughlin III of Hoffman Estates, Illinois. He organized the 1990 Doctor Who convention to raise money for Lambs Farm. The convention was run by McLaughlin with a committee of about twenty plus fan volunteers (gophers) recruited at each event.

Over time the convention expanded from a Doctor Who convention into a celebration of British TV shows. While the main focus of each convention was Doctor Who, Visions often invited actors from Blake's 7, Red Dwarf and Robin of Sherwood. Visions '93 celebrated the 30th anniversary of Doctor Who and the 15th anniversary of Blake's 7.

	invited guests	estimated attendance	ticket price
Visions '90 (November 23–25, 1990)	Jon Pertwee, Sylvester McCoy, Sophie Aldred, Frazer Hines, Michael Keating, Sally Knyvette, Michael Praed, Jason Connery, Mark Ryan, Terry Walsh, Dave Rogers, Robert Allen, John Peel, John Freeman, Linda Thorson, Eric Hoffman, Jean-Marc Lofficier		$50
Visions '91 (November 29–December 1, 1991)	Tom Baker, David Banks, Jeremy Bentham, Richard Carpenter, Robin Curtis, Paul Darrow, John Freeman, Mike Grell, David Jackson, Sally Knyvette, John Levene, Steven Pacey, John Peel, Frederik Pohl, Mark Ryan, Mark Strickson, Mary Tamm, Deborah Watling, Timothy Zahn	2200	$50
Visions '92 (November 27–29, 1992)	Colin Baker, Bill Baggs, Jeremy Bentham, Nicola Bryant, Jan Chappell, Craig Charles, Frank Conniff, Chris Jury, Robert Llewellyn, John Peel, Michael Praed, Gareth Thomas		$50
Visions '93 (November 26–28, 1993)	Peter Davison, Colin Baker, Carole Ann Ford, William Russell, John Levene, Elisabeth Sladen, John Leeson, Anthony Ainley, Nicola Bryant, Sophie Aldred, Jan Chappell, Wendy Padbury, Jacqueline Pearce, Mark Ryan, John Abineri, Jeremy Bulloch, Danny John-Jules, Bill Baggs, Christopher Barry, Jeremy Bentham, Jean-Marc Lofficier, Randy Lofficier, John Nathan-Turner, John Peel, Gary Downie	1600, 1800 or 2000	$100
Visions '94 (November 25–27, 1994)	Danny John-Jules, Robert Llewellyn, Jon Pertwee, Nicholas Courtney, John Levene, Chris Potter, Nickolas Grace, Mark Ryan, Paul Darrow, Sheelagh Wells, Joe Nazzarro, Doug Naylor	1100	
Visions '95 (November 24–26, 1995)	Sophie Aldred, Brian Blessed, Michael Craze, Paul Darrow, Mira Furlan, Hattie Hayridge, Norman Lovett, Sylvester McCoy, Michael O'Hare, Michael Praed, Gareth Thomas, Terry Walsh, Anneke Wills, Kate Orman, Gary Schofield, Paul Cornell, Kim "Howard" Johnson		$75
Visions '96 (November 29–December 1, 1996)	Colin Baker, Ben Bass, Richard Biggs, Claudia Christian, Stephen Greif, Michael Keating, Mark Ryan, Yee Jee Tso, Philip Segal, Sarah Sutton, Lalla Ward, Deborah Watling, Paul Cornell, Jessica Kindzierski, Chelsea Potter, Gary Russell		$75
Visions '97 (November 28–30, 1997)	Julie Caitlin Brown, Jeff Conaway, Peter Davison, Frazer Hines, Louise Jameson, Sally Knyvette, Gary Lockwood, Jeri Ryan, Patricia Tallman, Jeremy Bentham, Adam "MOJO" Lebowitz, David Maloney, Dave McDonnell, Joe Nazzaro, Sheelagh Wells, H. Ed Cox, Beth Falcone, Paul Simpson, Mark Short	1500	$75
HME Visions '98 (November 27–29, 1998)	Geoffrey Beevers, Nigel Bennett, Nicholas Brendon, Robin Atkin Downes, Erin Gray, Anthony Stewart Head, Louise Jameson, Caroline John, Sylvester McCoy, Tracy Scoggins, Kent McCord, Mark Strickson, Lisa Bowerman, John Platt, Beth Falcone, Dennison Love, Paul Simpson		$75

== Convention events ==
=== Panels ===
The main attraction of each convention was the hour-long question and answer sessions with the celebrities. There were also smaller gatherings run by fans called fan panels.

=== Variety show ===
The cabaret (renamed "variety show" in 1992) was 90-120 minute show featuring celebrity guests performing a variety of acts. A separate admission fee was charged for this event.

=== Video rooms ===
Video rooms (one in 1990, two thereafter) ran television shows and movies, concentrating on programs that attending celebrities appeared in. A third room featuring fan-made videos was added in 1996.

=== Autographs and photographs ===
Each fan was given the opportunity to meet the celebrities and receive and autograph and a photograph.

=== Auction ===
Each year fans participated in an auction of science fiction memorabilia. Proceeds went to Lambs Farm and the Make-A-Wish Foundation.

== Publications ==
=== Program book ===
A program book was given to each attending fan. The book included biographies of the guests, a map of the hotel, a schedule of the weekend's events and general convention rules.

=== Newsletter ===
ReVisions was published 4-6 times a year and contained news about the past and/or upcoming convention.

=== Rookie guide ===
The Visions Rookie Guide was written for first-time attendees of Visions.

== Websites ==
The original website was at http://www.xnet.com/~tardis. A second, http://hme-visions.com, was added in northern autumn 1998.

== Merchandise ==
=== T-shirts ===
T-shirts featuring that year's logo were available for purchase by mail or at the convention.

=== Videos ===
Video tapes of selected panels and variety shows were available for purchase by mail.

== Special events ==
- Attendees of Visions '92 were given the chance to help in the development of the Doctor Who pinball machine. At least one machine was available for play during the convention.
- To celebrate the 30th anniversary of Doctor Who the BBC broadcast a specially-made episode called Dimensions in Time. Producer John Nathan-Turner brought a copy to Visions '93 and showed it Friday and Saturday nights. As the episode was made in 3-D, special glasses were sold for the viewings with the proceeds going to Children in Need.
- The 1996 convention saw the premiere performance of Mysterious Theatre 337 (MT337). An homage to Mystery Science Theater 3000, MT337 performed to Doctor Who episodes instead of B movies. Additional performances occurred in 1997 and 1998 and continue at Chicago TARDIS and Gallifrey One.

== Other conventions ==
Visions followed earlier conventions held in the Chicago area around Thanksgiving. Brit TV was held in 1988 (in Lincolnwood, Illinois) and 1989 (in Rosemont, Illinois). Spirit of Light Enterprises ran Doctor Who conventions in the mid-1980s. Following the demise of Visions Chicago TARDIS took over the Thanksgiving slot beginning in 2000.
