= Clint Frank =

American football player and advertising executive (1915–1992)

- Frank at Yale

No. 14
- Position: Halfback

Personal information
- Born: September 13, 1915; St. Louis, Missouri, U.S.
- Died: July 7, 1992 (aged 76); Evanston, Illinois, U.S.
- Listed height: 5 ft 10 in (1.78 m)
- Listed weight: 190 lb (86 kg)

Career information
- High school: Evanston (Evanston, Illinois)
- College: Yale (1935–1937)

Awards and highlights
- Heisman Trophy (1937); Maxwell Award (1937); Unanimous All-American (1937); First-team All-American (1936); 2× First-team All-Eastern (1936, 1937)
- College Football Hall of Fame (Class of 1955)

Clinton E. Frank (September 13, 1915 – July 7, 1992) was an American football player and advertising executive. He played as a halfback for the Yale Bulldogs, where he won both the Heisman Trophy and the Maxwell Award in 1937. In 1954, he founded the Clinton E. Frank, Inc. advertising agency.

== Early life and football career ==
Frank attended Evanston Township High School in Evanston, Illinois, where he became known as a superb football player. He then attended Lawrenceville School as a post-graduate student.

Frank attended Yale College, where he was a member of Skull and Bones, and graduated with a degree in economics in 1938. Playing for the Yale Bulldogs football team, he was a first-team selection to the All-America Teams of 1936 and 1937, the latter being a unanimous selection. As a senior, he was captain of the 1937 Bulldogs, and scored three touchdowns in Yale's 19–0 victory over Brown. Frank won both the Heisman Trophy and Maxwell Award for the 1937 season. He beat out Byron "Whizzer" White for the Heisman Trophy; White later became a justice of the U.S. Supreme Court.

Frank was selected in the 12th round of the 1938 NFL draft by the Detroit Lions, but he did not sign and never played professional football. Frank was married to Margaret Rathje Frank, with whom he had three sons and six daughters.

== Military service ==
Clint Frank attained the rank of lieutenant colonel in the Army Air Corps, serving as an aide to General Jimmy Doolittle during World War II. Following the war he resumed his career in advertising.

== Advertising career ==
Frank joined the Chicago advertising firm of Blackett-Sample-Hummert Inc., where he was employed for ten years before being promoted to advertising manager of E.J. Brach and Sons, the famed candy producer. Frank became a full partner in the advertising agency of Price, Robinson and Frank. He was able to transition this agency into his own with him as owner and president. In 1954 Frank established Clinton E. Frank Inc., a Chicago based advertising agency which was sold to Campbell-Ewald Co. of Detroit in 1976.

=== Braniff Airways account ===
One of Clinton E. Frank Agency's most memorable clients was the flashy Dallas-based Braniff International Airways. Frank obtained the account in 1969 from famed advertising executive George Lois. The Frank Agency created the "El Clan, Braniff" advertising scheme for Braniff's growing South American Route System. They also created the highly unique Braniff "You'll Like Flying Braniff Style" Campaign. Both campaigns came complete with musical jingles which were debuted in 1971.

== Honors ==
- Heisman Trophy, 1937
- Maxwell Award, 1937
- All American Quarterback and captain, two time recipient, 1937
- Football Hall of Fame, elected 1955
- Sports Illustrated Silver Anniverdary All-America, 1962
- Football Hall of Fame Gold Medal, 1988
- Good Shepherd Award from Lambs Farm

== Retirement and death ==
Frank founded the Brain Research Foundation at the University of Chicago and the Eye Research Institute in Boston. While in retirement, he founded the American Academy of Arts.

Frank died at Evanston Hospital in Evanston, Illinois after a brief illness at the age of 76.
