= 1937 All-Southwest Conference football team =

American college football all-star team

The 1937 All-Southwest Conference football team consists of American football players chosen by various organizations for All-Southwest Conference teams for the 1937 college football season. The selectors for the 1937 season included the Associated Press (AP).

== All Southwest selections ==
=== Backs ===
- Billy Patterson, Baylor (AP-1 [QB])
- Dick Todd, Texas A&M (AP-1 [HB])
- Davey O'Brien, Texas Christian (AP-1 [HB]) (College Football Hall of Fame)
- Hugh Wolfe, Texas (AP-1 [FB])
- Jack Robbins, Arkansas (AP-2)
- Dwight Sloan, Arkansas (AP-2)
- Ernest Lain, Rice (AP-2)

=== Ends ===
- Jim Benton, Arkansas (AP-1)
- Sam Boyd, Baylor (AP-1)
- Frank Huessner, Baylor (AP-2)
- Ray Acker, Southern Methodist (AP-2)

=== Tackles ===
- I. B. Hale, Texas Christian (AP-1)
- Charles Sprague, Southern Methodist (AP-1)
- Roy Young, Texas A&M (AP-2)
- Hervy Blue, Baylor (AP-2)

=== Guards ===
- Joe Routt, Texas A&M (AP-1) (College Football Hall of Fame)
- Virgil Jones, Texas A&M (AP-1)
- Glynn Rogers, Texas Christian (AP-2)
- Emmett Kriel, Baylor (AP-2)

=== Centers ===
- Ki Aldrich, Texas Christian (AP-1)
- Lloyd Woodell, Arkansas (AP-2)

== Key ==
AP = Associated Press

== See also ==
- 1937 College Football All-America Team
