= List of UC Santa Barbara Gauchos in the NFL draft =

This is a list of UC Santa Barbara Gauchos football players in the NFL draft.

== Key ==
B	Back	K	Kicker	NT	Nose tackle
C	Center	LB	Linebacker	FB	Fullback
DB	Defensive back	P	Punter	HB	Halfback
DE	Defensive end	QB	Quarterback	WR	Wide receiver
DT	Defensive tackle	RB	Running back	G	Guard
E	End	T	Offensive tackle	TE	Tight end

== Draft picks ==
Year drafted	Round	Pick in round	Overall pick	Player	Team	Position
1938	11	8	98	Doug Oldershaw	New York Giants	G-E
1958	12	7	137	Johnny Morris	Chicago Bears	FL-HB
1968	14	11	365	Dave Zivich	Washington Redskins	T
1960	2		First Selections	Jim St. Clair	New York Titans*	QB
1969	10	16	250	Dave Chapple	San Francisco 49ers	P
1969	12	7	293	Tom Broadhead	New Orleans Saints	RB
1969	13	20	331	Dick Heinz	St. Louis Cardinals	DT
1972	11	1	261	Kent Pederson	Cincinnati Bengals	TE

* Pick was made as part of the original AFL draft to stock the new league.
** Pick was made in the regular AFL draft (1961–1966).
*** Pick was made in the AFL Redshirt draft (1965–1966).
