= 1938 All-Eastern football team =

Team of American football players

The 1938 All-Eastern football team consists of American football players chosen by various selectors as the best players at each position among the Eastern colleges and universities during the 1938 college football season.

== All-Eastern selections ==
=== Quarterbacks ===
- Sid Luckman, Columbia (AP-1)
- Wilmeth Sidat-Singh, Syracuse (AP-2)

=== Halfbacks ===
- Bob MacLeod, Dartmouth (AP-1)
- Marshall Goldberg, Pittsburgh (AP-1)
- Ray Carnelly, Carnegie Tech (AP-2)
- Irving Hall, Brown (AP-2)

=== Fullbacks ===
- Bill Osmanski, Holy Cross (AP-1)
- Harold Stebbins, Pittsburgh (AP-2)

=== Ends ===
- Jerome H. Holland, Cornell (AP-1)
- Bill Daddio, Pittsburgh (AP-1)
- John Wysocki, Villanova (AP-2)
- Harry Jacunski, Fordham (AP-2)

=== Tackles ===
- Joe Delaney, Holy Cross (AP-1)
- Bill McKeever, Cornell (AP-1)
- Harry Stella, Army (AP-2)
- Walter Shinn, Penn (AP-2)

=== Guards ===
- A. Sidney Roth, Cornell (AP-1)
- Steve Petro, Pittsburgh (AP-1)
- James Hayes, Fordham (AP-2)
- Matt Kuber, Villanova (AP-2)

=== Centers ===
- Bob Gibson, Dartmouth (AP-1)
- James Conlin, NYU (AP-2)

== Key ==
- AP = Associated Press
- NEA = Newspaper Enterprise Association
- AK = Andrew Kerr
- PW = Pop Warner

== See also ==
- 1938 College Football All-America Team
