= Max Starcevich =

American football player (1911–1990)

Max John Starcevich
Profile
- Position: Guard

Personal information
- Born: October 19, 1911; Centerville, Iowa, U.S.
- Died: August 9, 1990 (aged 78); Silverdale, Washington, U.S.

Career information
- College: Washington

Awards and highlights
- Consensus All-American (1936); 2× First-team All-PCC (1935, 1936)
- College Football Hall of Fame

Max J. Starcevich (October 19, 1911 – August 9, 1990) was a consensus All-American football guard at the University of Washington. Though he was selected by the Brooklyn Dodgers in the third round of the 1937 NFL draft, Starcevich did not play in the National Football League (NFL). He was elected to the University of Washington Hall of Fame in 1989 and to the College Football Hall of Fame in 1990.

== Early life ==
Born in Iowa, of Croat origin, Max Starcevich played high school football in Duluth, Minnesota. After high school he worked two years in a steel mill in Gary, Indiana. Max decided to go to college and attended junior college in Duluth for one year before moving to Seattle to attend the University of Washington. Starcevich was one of the "Strauss Boys" who were recruited by Alfred "Doc" Strauss. Dr. Alfred Strauss, a renowned surgeon and a pioneer in cancer research, was a Washington alumnus that moved to Chicago when he attended medical school. Over the years he recruited more than 100 football players from the Chicago area to the University of Washington, several of whom became All Americans.

== College career ==
At the University of Washington, Starcevich, who wore #66, played fullback and tackle before settling in at guard where he excelled. By the end of his career at Washington he lettered three times (1934, '35 and '36 seasons), was named All Pacific Coast Conference twice (1935 and '36 seasons) including first team in 1936, started in the 1937 Rose Bowl, and was named to the first team of the 1936 College Football All-America Team. In Max Starcevich's last football game he started for the collegian team when they beat the defending NFL Champion Green Bay Packers, 6–0, in the 1937 Chicago Tribune All-Star Game. He was elected to the University of Washington Hall of Fame in 1989

== Later life ==
Starcevich did not play football in the NFL. Instead he started a career as an educator in Seattle, where for 36 years he was a teacher, coach, and high school principal. Max began at Cleveland High and moved to Roosevelt High where he taught social studies. Later he was boys' adviser at Lincoln High. Starcevich stayed involved with football. He was an assistant coach at Cleveland High School (1937). In 1948, he was a Washington assistant coach assigned to the freshmen team under coach Howard Odell. He was also involved in high school football and basketball as an official for 20 years. Another of his passions was environmental conservation. Max was an officer in the Audubon Society.
