= Robert Allen Hale =

American criminal, rapist and cult leader (1941–2008)

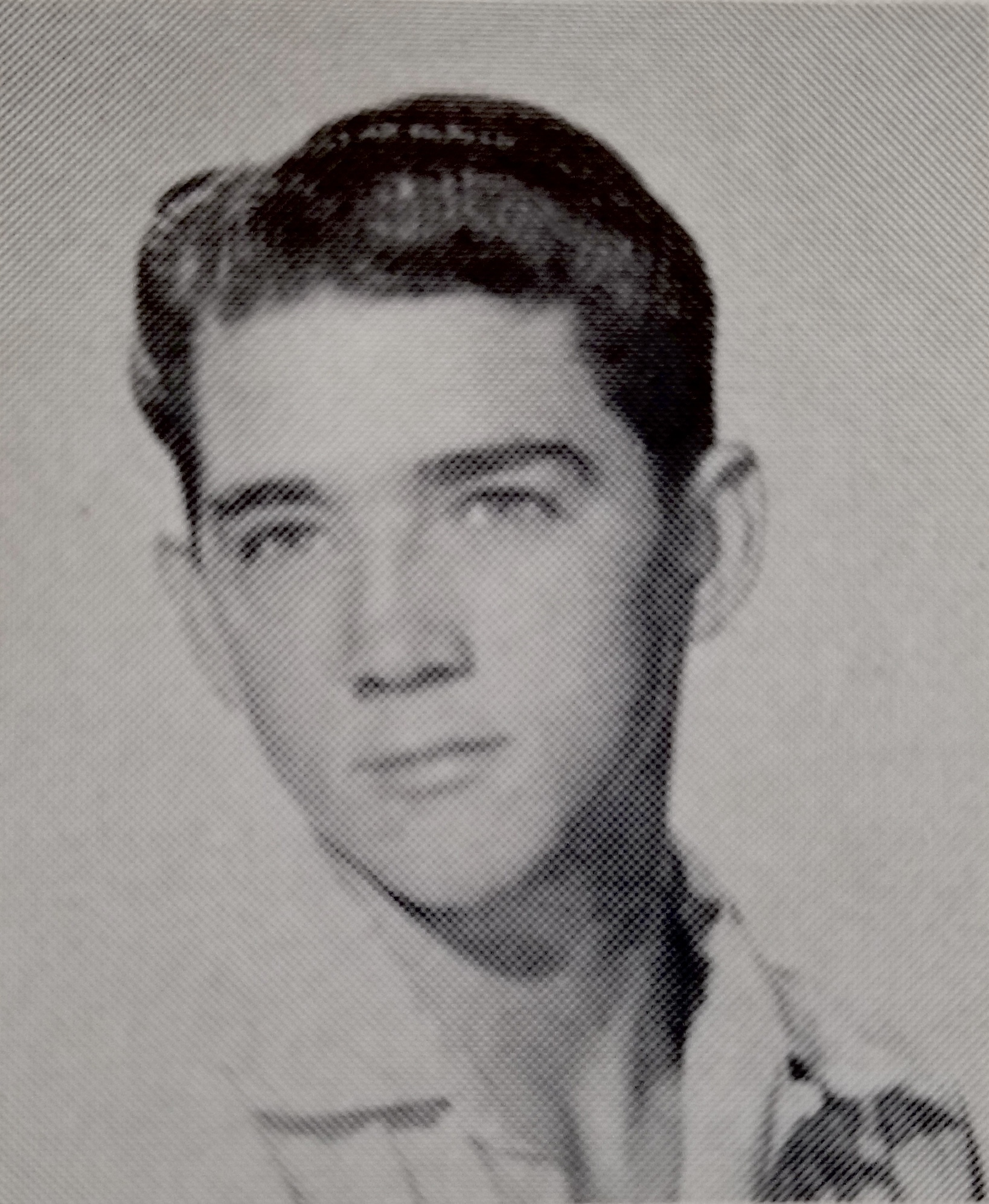
- 1957 Arlington Heights High School Yearbook Photo
- Born: Robert Allen Hale; April 7, 1941; Fort Worth, Texas, U.S.
- Died: May 24, 2008 (aged 67); Anchorage, Alaska, U.S.
- Other names: Bobby Hale, Papa Pilgrim
- Occupation: Homesteader
- Spouses: Kathleen Connally (m. 1959; Suicide 1959) Kurina Bresler (m. 1974–2008)
- Children: 18
- Convictions: sexual assault, kidnapping, and incest
- Penalty: 14 year imprisonment

Robert Allan Hale (April 7, 1941 – May 24, 2008) — known as Bobby Hale, as well as Papa Pilgrim and Sunstar — was an American criminal who mentally, physically, and sexually abused his wife and 15 children in the Alaskan wilderness, while his 3 other children were said to have gone missing.

== Early life ==
Robert Allan Hale was the son of Virginia and I. B. Hale. He had a twin brother, Billy, and younger brother, Tommy. He grew up in Fort Worth, Texas and attended Arlington Heights High School.

As an 18-year-old senior, Hale eloped in Ardmore, Oklahoma with 16-year-old Kathleen "K.K." Connally who was pregnant, the daughter of future Texas governor John Connally. On March 16, 1959, the couple were married in Ardmore prior to moving into an apartment in Tallahassee, Florida. Hale worked for a boat company earning $75 per week. The couple had been married only 44 days when Kathleen died after a 20-gauge shotgun discharged behind her right ear on April 28, 1959. Hale spent that night in jail; police reported that he was held in "protective custody" pending the ruling of a coroner's jury.

On April 29, Hale testified that Kathleen had left their apartment after an argument on the evening of April 27 and did not return until noon the following day. According to Hale, he spent the night looking for her and returned to find her sitting on a couch holding the gun. He said that his wife was about to commit suicide and that the gun discharged when he lunged at it. Both fathers testified at the inquest; John Connally stated that his daughter was pregnant and had been despondent over the move to Florida. After 45 minutes of deliberations, Hale was cleared of responsibility for Kathleen's death when the jury ruled it to be an accident.

== Other legal troubles and death ==
On August 7, 1962, before living in Alaska, Hale and his twin brother "Billy" Hale were observed by an FBI agent as they burgled the Los Angeles apartment of Judith Exner, who later claimed to be a mistress of President John F. Kennedy.

In 1974, Robert Hale (then going by the name "Sunstar") met 16-year-old Kurina Rose Bresler in the California desert. She would later call herself "Country Rose" and bear Hale 15 children. Hale had gained notoriety through his family's iconoclastic lifestyle. A self-proclaimed devout Christian, Hale moved his family of 17 to Alaska from New Mexico in 1998 and kept them isolated from nearly all outside influences, including churches.

In 2002, Hale launched a legal battle with the National Park Service over his plan to bulldoze a road to his 410-acre ranch ("Hillbilly Heaven") inside the remote Wrangell-St. Elias National Park, near the small town of McCarthy, Alaska. He lost his case at the US Court of Appeals (9th Cir., San Francisco). He appealed to the U.S. Supreme Court, and the Court refused to hear it.

In 2005, family members told police that Hale had routinely beaten and raped his eldest daughter for years. He was incarcerated in September 2007 and died eight months later on May 26, 2008. He was a diabetic and had been in poor health since at least 2006.

Hale was mentioned in Seymour Hersh's 1997 book The Dark Side of Camelot. In 2013 a book was published by Tom Kizzia titled Pilgrim's Wilderness: A True Story of Faith and Madness on the Alaska Frontier, chronicling Hale's life with a focus on his time in McCarthy. The initial arrival of Hale and the Pilgrim Family in McCarthy was also documented by the humourist and travel-documentarist Pete McCarthy in The Road To McCarthy (2002).
