= Phil Dougherty =

American football player (1912–2000)

No. 14, 26
- Position: Center

Personal information
- Born: September 20, 1912; San Francisco, California, U.S.
- Died: September 28, 2000 (aged 88); Granite Bay, California, U.S.
- Listed height: 5 ft 11 in (1.80 m)
- Listed weight: 185 lb (84 kg)

Career information
- High school: Mission (San Francisco)
- College: Santa Clara (1934-1937)
- NFL draft: 1938: 9th round, 75th overall pick

Career history
- Chicago Cardinals (1938)

Awards and highlights
- Pro Bowl (1938); First-team All-American (1937); First-team All-PCC (1937); Second-team All-PCC (1936)

Career NFL statistics
- Games played: 8
- Games started: 4
- Touchdowns: 1
- Stats at Pro Football Reference

Phillip Francis Dougherty (September 20, 1912 – September 28, 2000) was an American professional football player who was a Center in the National Football League (NFL). He played college football for the Santa Clara Broncos and was selected 75th overall in the ninth round of the 1938 NFL draft. He played one season for the Chicago Cardinals (1938).
