= Steve Petro =

American football player (1914–1994)

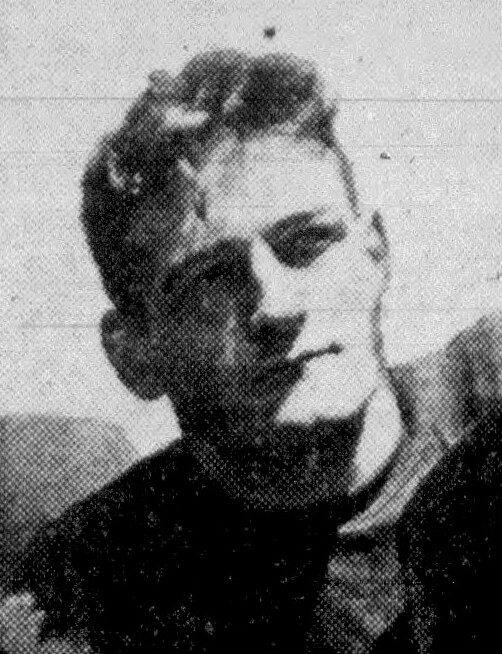
- Petro in 1942

No. 31
- Position: Guard

Personal information
- Born: October 21, 1914; Johnstown, Pennsylvania, U.S.
- Died: August 15, 1994 (aged 79); Jefferson Hills, Pennsylvania, U.S.
- Listed height: 5 ft 10 in (1.78 m)
- Listed weight: 195 lb (88 kg)

Career information
- High school: Johnstown
- College: Pittsburgh (1935–1938)
- NFL draft: 1939: 9th round, 72nd overall pick

Career history
- Brooklyn Dodgers (1940–1941)

Awards and highlights
- National champion (1937); First-team All-Eastern (1938)

Career NFL statistics
- Games played: 17
- Stats at Pro Football Reference

Stephen Lawrence Petro (October 21, 1914 – August 15, 1994) was an American professional football guard who played two seasons with the Brooklyn Dodgers of the National Football League (NFL). He was selected by the Pittsburgh Pirates in the ninth round of the 1939 NFL draft after playing college football at the University of Pittsburgh.

== Early life and college ==
Stephen Lawrence Petro was born on October 21, 1914, in Johnstown, Pennsylvania. He attended Greater Johnstown High School.

Petro played college football for the Pittsburgh Panthers of the University of Pittsburgh under head coach Jock Sutherland. He was on the freshman team in 1935 and was a three-year letterman from 1936 to 1938. The 1937 Panthers were named national champions. Petro earned Associated Press first-team All-Eastern honors his senior year in 1938.

== Professional career ==
Petro was selected by the Pittsburgh Pirates in the ninth round, with the 72nd overall pick, of the 1939 NFL draft. In 1940, his negotiation rights were traded to the Brooklyn Dodgers. He signed with the Dodgers on August 8, 1940. Petro played in all 11 games, starting six, for the Dodgers during the 1940 season. He appeared in six games in 1941. He then served in the United States Army Air Forces during World War II.

== Post-playing career ==
Petro was an assistant football coach for the Pittsburgh Panthers from 1950 to 1972. He was also the Assistant to the Athletic Director from 1973 to 1984. His Pitt nickname was "the Rock," based on Petro, a derivation of the Greek word petros, which means rock. The Pitt Panther mascot's nickname is ROC, in Steve's honor.

Petro died on August 15, 1994, in Jefferson Hills, Pennsylvania.
