= I. B. Hale =

American football player (1916–1971)

- Born: September 9, 1916
- Died: May 14, 1971 (aged 54)
- Occupation: FBI Agent
- Football career

Profile
- Position: Tackle

Personal information
- Listed height: 6 ft 2 in (1.88 m)
- Listed weight: 246 lb (112 kg)

Career information
- High school: Woodrow Wilson (Dallas, TX)
- College: TCU (1937–1938)

Awards and highlights
- National champion (1938); 2× First-team All-American (1937, 1938); 2× First-team All-SWC (1937, 1938); Texas Sports Hall of Fame

Insall Bailey Hale (September 9, 1916 – May 14, 1971) was an American football tackle at Texas Christian University (TCU) who was voted an All-American. He was drafted in the first round of the 1939 NFL draft by the Washington Redskins, but never played football professionally.

Hale was married to the former Virginia Kingsbery, and the couple had at least three sons (twins Robert Allen Hale and William Hale, and Timothy Hale). Hale became a Federal Bureau of Investigation (FBI) agent in Fort Worth, Texas and was a close associate of J. Edgar Hoover. Later he became chief of security for the Convair aircraft factory and General Dynamics, and was a chairman of ASIS International. Hale died of a heart attack in 1971.

Hale was best friends with Heisman winner Davey O'Brien, who played football with him at Woodrow Wilson High School in Dallas, Texas and also at TCU. They both worked for the FBI.

Hale was inducted into the Texas Sports Hall of Fame in 1985.
