= 1937 All-Pacific Coast football team =

American all-star college football team

The 1937 All-Pacific Coast football team consists of American football players chosen by various organizations for All-Pacific Coast teams for the 1937 college football season. The organizations selecting teams in 1937 included the Associated Press (AP), the International News Service (INS), and the United Press (UP).

The 1937 California Golden Bears football team, known as the "Thunder Team," won the Pacific Coast Conference (PCC) championship with a 10-0-1 record, were ranked #2 in the final AP Poll, and defeated Alabama by a 13-0 score in the 1938 Rose Bowl. Six members of the 1937 California team received first-team honors from the AP, INS, or UP. The Cal honorees were quarterback Johnny Meek (AP, INS, UP), halfbacks Vic Bottari (INS, UP) and Sam Chapman (AP, INS, UP), end Perry Schwartz (AP, UP), guard Vard Stockton (AP, INS, UP), and center Bob Herwig (AP, INS, UP).

Three players from teams outside the PCC received first-team honors: fullback George Karamatic of the Gonzaga Bulldogs (AP), tackle Alvord Wolff of the Santa Clara Broncos (AP), and guard Dougherty of Santa Clara.

== All-Pacific Coast selections ==
=== Quarterback ===
- Johnny Meek, California (AP-1; INS-1; UP-1)
- Ambrose Schindler, USC (AP-2; UP-2)

=== Halfbacks ===
- Sam Chapman, California (AP-1; INS-1; UP-1 [fullback])
- Joe Gray, Oregon State (AP-1; INS-1 [fullback]; UP-1)
- Vic Bottari, California (AP-2; INS-1; UP-1) (College Football Hall of Fame)
- Milt Popovich, Montana (AP-2; UP-2)
- Kenny Washington, UCLA (UP-2)

=== Fullback ===
- George Karamatic, Gonzaga (AP-1; UP-2)
- D. Anderson, California (AP-2)

=== Ends ===
- Perry Schwartz, California (AP-1; INS-1; UP-1)
- Grant Stone, Stanford (AP-1; INS-1; UP-1)
- Joe Wendlick, Oregon State (AP-2; UP-2)
- Johnson, Washington (AP-2)
- Woody Strode, UCLA (UP-2)

=== Tackles ===
- Vic Markov, Washington (AP-1; INS-1; UP-1) (College Football Hall of Fame)
- Pete Zagar, Stanford (AP-2; INS-1; UP-1)
- Alvord Wolff, Santa Clara (AP-1)
- Bob Grimstead, Washington State (AP-2; UP-2)
- Bill Stoll, California (UP-2)

=== Guards ===
- Vard Stockton, California (AP-1; INS-1; UP-1)
- Steve Slivinski, Washington (AP-1; UP-1)
- Phil Dougherty, Santa Clara (INS-1)
- Evans, California (AP-2; UP-2)
- Al Hoptowit, Washington State (AP-2; UP-2)

=== Centers ===
- Bob Herwig, California (AP-1; INS-1; UP-1) (College Football Hall of Fame)
- Rodger Dougherty, Washington State (AP-2; INS-1)
- Bud Ericksen, Washington (UP-2)

== Key ==
AP = Associated Press, "selected for the Associated Press by a committee of coaches and football experts"

INS = International News Service, based on ballots cast by "the region's top-notch coaches, officials and writers"

UP = United Press, "chosen by client sporting editors"

Bold = Consensus first-team selection of at least two selectors from the AP, INS, and UP

== See also ==
- 1937 College Football All-America Team
