= Hugh Wolfe =

American football player (1912–2010)

No. 51, 19
- Position: Fullback

Personal information
- Born: June 13, 1912; Mason, Texas, U.S.
- Died: May 20, 2010 (aged 97); Fort Worth, Texas, U.S.
- Listed height: 6 ft 0 in (1.83 m)
- Listed weight: 205 lb (93 kg)

Career information
- High school: Stephenville (Stephenville, Texas)
- College: Texas
- NFL draft: 1938: 3rd round, 19th overall pick

Career history
- New York Giants (1938)

Awards and highlights
- NFL champion (1938); NFL All-Star Game (1938); Second-team All-American (1937); 2× First-team All-SWC (1936, 1937)

Career NFL statistics
- Rushing yards: 19
- Rushing average: 1.3
- Receptions: 2
- Receiving yards: 23
- Stats at Pro Football Reference

Hugh Othello Wolfe (June 13, 1912 – May 20, 2010) was an American professional football fullback who played one season with the New York Giants of the National Football League (NFL). He was drafted by the Pittsburgh Pirates in the third round of the 1938 NFL draft. Wolfe first enrolled at John Tarleton Agricultural College before transferring to the University of Texas. He was a member of the New York Giants team that won the 1938 NFL Championship. Nicknames attributed to him include "Big Bad" and "Red", although he may have never been called "Red".

== Early life ==
Wolfe was born on June 13, 1912, in Mason, Texas, and moved to Stephenville, Texas, at the age of seven. He attended Stephenville High School in Stephenville, Texas.

== College career ==
Wolfe participated in football, basketball, and track and field at John Tarleton Agricultural College.

Wolfe then transferred to play for the Texas Longhorns of the University of Texas in 1934. He was an All-SWC selection and the top scorer for the Longhorns in 1936 and 1937. He played in the 1938 East–West Shrine Game. Wolfe was also a member of the 1937 SWC championship track and field team and won a SWC discus title in track and field. He was named second-team All-American by the United Press in 1937. In a November 14, 1936, game against Minnesota, he set a then-school record with a 95-yard kickoff return for a touchdown, quick kicked 90 yards, and had an onside kick that traveled 50 yards into Minnesota's end zone and was recovered by a Longhorn teammate for a touchdown. Wolfe kicked a game-winning field goal in a 9–6 win against Baylor on November 6, 1937. The victory knocked Baylor out of Rose Bowl contention. He turned down an invitation to compete in the decathlon at the 1936 Olympics.

He is a member of the Tarleton Athletics Hall of Fame and the University of Texas Athletics Hall of Honor, into which he was inducted in 1977.

== Professional career ==
Wolfe was drafted by the Pittsburgh Pirates of the NFL with the 19th pick in the 1938 NFL draft. He was the first Texas Longhorn to be selected in the NFL draft. He played for the NFL's New York Giants in 1938 and was named to the Pro Bowl team. The Giants defeated the Green Bay Packers 23-17 on December 11, 1938, to win the 1938 NFL Championship.

In 1939 he played for the pro side of the annual College vs Pro All-star game at Wrigley Field. In February he was traded to the Philadelphia Eagles for halfback Irving Hall. But, he didn't play that season. Instead he went to Hawaii to coach the Hawaii Polar Bears, a group of college all-stars that played in the Hawaiian Amateur Senior League.

== Personal life ==
Wolfe served in the United States Armed Forces during World War II. He established an aluminum gate manufacturing company called Al-Prodco (Aluminum Products Company). He also ran a family nursery called Wolfe Nursery. Wolfe died on May 20, 2010, in a Fort Worth hospice center.
