= Emmett Kriel =

American football player (1916–1984)

No. 25, 28
- Position: Guard

Personal information
- Born: May 12, 1916; Coupland, Texas, U.S.
- Died: November 26, 1984 (aged 68); Houston, Texas, U.S.
- Listed height: 6 ft 2 in (1.88 m)
- Listed weight: 199 lb (90 kg)

Career information
- High school: Taylor (Taylor, Texas)
- College: Baylor
- NFL draft: 1938: 10th round, 82nd overall pick

Career history
- Philadelphia Eagles (1938–1939); Wilmington Clippers (1939)

Awards and highlights
- Second-team All-SWC (1937)

Career NFL statistics
- Games played: 1
- Stats at Pro Football Reference

Emmett Karl Kriel (May 12, 1916 – November 26, 1984) was an American professional football player who was a guard for one season with the Philadelphia Eagles of the National Football League (NFL) in 1939. From Taylor, Texas, he played college football for the Baylor Bears and was selected by the Eagles in the tenth round of the 1938 NFL draft.

Kriel also played for the Wilmington Clippers.
