= Jack Robbins =

American football player (1916–1983)

No. 55
- Position: Tailback

Personal information
- Born: January 23, 1916; Little Rock, Arkansas, U.S.
- Died: January 1, 1983 (aged 66); Lafayette, Louisiana, U.S.
- Listed height: 6 ft 2 in (1.88 m)
- Listed weight: 183 lb (83 kg)

Career information
- High school: Little Rock Central
- College: Arkansas
- NFL draft: 1938: 1st round, 5th overall pick

Career history
- Chicago Cardinals (1938–1939)

Awards and highlights
- First-team All-SWC (1936); Second-team All-SWC (1937); Arkansas Sports Hall of Fame (1974)

Career NFL statistics
- Passing yards: 1,076
- TD–INT: 6–19
- Passer rating: 38.4
- Stats at Pro Football Reference

Jack William Robbins (January 23, 1916 – January 1983) was an American professional football halfback who played two seasons in the National Football League (NFL) for the Chicago Cardinals. Robbins also played quarterback during his two years in the NFL.

Robbins played college football and basketball at the University of Arkansas before being selected in the first round with the fifth overall pick in the 1938 NFL draft, where he was the first of four Arkansas Razorbacks drafted.
