= Vard Stockton =

American football player (1916–1946)

Profile
- Position: Guard

Personal information
- Born: June 2, 1916; Nebraska, U.S.
- Died: September 29, 1946 (aged 30); Uintah County, Utah, U.S.

Career information
- High school: Alhambra (CA)
- College: California

Awards and highlights
- First-team All-American (1937); First-team All-PCC (1937)

Vard Albert Stockton Jr. (June 2, 1916 – September 29, 1946) was an American football player. born in Nebraska, Stockton moved to Southern California as a boy and attended Alhambra High School. His father, Vard Stockton Sr., was a noted photographer who was friends with, Norman Rockwell. The younger Stockton later attended the University of California, Berkeley, and played college football for the California Golden Bears football team. He played at the guard position for the Golden Bears and was selected by United Press, Newspaper Enterprise Association (NEA), International News Service (INS), Central Press Association, and North American Newspaper Alliance as a first-team guard on the 1937 College Football All-America Team. Stockton died in a car crash in 1946.
