= Byron Haines =

American football player (1914–2008)

No. 53
- Position: Running back

Personal information
- Born: November 30, 1914; Bend, Oregon, U.S.
- Died: March 9, 2008 (aged 93); Bellevue, Washington, U.S.
- Listed height: 5 ft 11 in (1.80 m)
- Listed weight: 185 lb (84 kg)

Career information
- High school: Bend
- College: Washington (1933-1936)
- NFL draft: 1937: 7th round, 65th overall pick

Career history
- Pittsburgh Pirates (1937)

Awards and highlights
- Third-team All-American (1936); 2× First-team All-PCC (1935, 1936)

Career NFL statistics
- Rushing yards: 29
- Rushing average: 1.2
- Receptions: 2
- Receiving yards: 17
- Stats at Pro Football Reference

Byron Dalton Haines (November 30, 1914 – March 9, 2008) was an American professional football halfback who played one season in the National Football League (NFL) for the Pittsburgh Pirates. He played college football at the University of Washington and was selected in the seventh round of the 1937 NFL draft.

== College ==
Haines was a three-year letterman at halfback while at Washington from 1934 to 1936, concluding with 1937 Rose Bowl. Following his Washington career, Byron played in the Chicago Tribune All-Star Game.
