= Alvord Wolff =

American football player (1917–2014)

Profile
- Position: Tackle

Personal information
- Born: November 18, 1917; San Francisco, California, U.S.
- Died: September 6, 2014 (aged 96); Santa Barbara, California, U.S.

Career information
- College: Santa Clara

Awards and highlights
- Consensus All-American (1938); Third-team All-American (1937); 2× First-team All-PCC (1937, 1938)

William Alvord Wolff Jr. (November 18, 1917 –September 6, 2014) was an American college football player.

Wolff was born in 1917 in San Francisco. He sold newspapers there as a boy. He was an all-city football player at Mission High School in San Francisco.

Wolff attended Santa Clara University on a full scholarship. He played college football for the school at the tackle position. He helped lead the 1936 Santa Clara Broncos football team to an 8–1 record, the No. 6 ranking in the final AP Poll, and a victory over LSU in the 1937 Sugar Bowl. He was a consensus pick for the 1938 All-America team. In announcing the NEA All-American team in 1939, sports editor Harry Grayson described Wolff as "fast for all his 220 pounds" and "a vicious tackler" who was strong on both offense and defense. The Associated Press wrote: "He was such a bulwark that opposing teams soon found it was futile to direct plays into his neighborhood. He was a ball hawk at intercepting passes and grabbing fumbles."

Wolff was selected in the third round with the 16th pick overall of the 1939 NFL draft by the Chicago Cardinals. However, he opted not to play professional football and later recalled: "I played football in college to get an education, not to get my brains scrambled!"

After graduating from Santa Clara, Wolff worked for U.S. Steel and later for Food Machinery Corporation of San Jose. He was married for 49 years to his first wife, Marcella Jensen Wolff. She predeceased him, and he later remarried to Connie Duckworth Wolff. Wolfff died in 2014 in Santa Barbara, California.
