= Steve Slivinski =

American football player and coach (1917–2008)

No. 16
- Positions: Guard, Linebacker

Personal information
- Born: August 23, 1917; Cicero, Illinois, U.S.
- Died: November 15, 2008 (aged 91); Burien, Washington, U.S.
- Listed height: 5 ft 10 in (1.78 m)
- Listed weight: 214 lb (97 kg)

Career information
- High school: Tilden (Chicago, Illinois)
- College: Washington (1935-1938)
- NFL draft: 1939: 13th round, 118th overall pick

Career history
- Washington Redskins (1939–1943)

Awards and highlights
- NFL champion (1942); Second-team All-Pro (1940); Pro Bowl (1942); Second-team All-American (1937); 2× First-team All-PCC (1937, 1938)

Career NFL statistics
- Games played: 53
- Games started: 30
- Interceptions: 2
- Stats at Pro Football Reference

Stephen Paul Slivinski (August 23, 1917 – November 15, 2008) was an American professional football guard in the National Football League (NFL) for the Washington Redskins. He played college football at the University of Washington and was drafted in the thirteenth round of the 1939 NFL draft.

Slivinski returned to Washington as a coach in 1945.
