= Harry Stella =

American football player and United States Army officer

Profile
- Position: Tackle

Personal information
- Born: December 24, 1916; Iowa, U.S.
- Died: February 8, 1997 (aged 80); Tacoma, Washington, U.S.

Career information
- College: United States Military Academy

Career history
- 1937–1939: Army

Awards and highlights
- First-team All-American (1939); First-team All-Eastern (1939); Second-team All-Eastern (1938)

Harry Ami Stella (December 24, 1916 – February 8, 1997) was an American football player and United States Army officer.

Stella was born in Iowa and grew up in Kankakee, Illinois. He attended the Missouri School of Mines before enrolling at the United States Military Academy in 1936. Stella played at the tackle position for the Army Cadets football team. He was captain of Army's 1939 football team and was selected by the United Press, Newsweek magazine, and International News Service (INS) as a first-team player on the 1939 College Football All-America Team. He also played for the Army baseball team and was the Eastern intercollegiate heavy weight boxing champion.

After graduating from the Military Academy, Stella served in the United States Army until 1970, including service in the Pacific Theater during World War II and in the Korean War. He was awarded a Silver Star for gallantry in action and the Legion of Merit for his work as a planner at the Joint Amphibious School. In 1955, he was promoted to the rank of colonel.
