= Tony Calvelli =

American football player and track athlete (1915–1979)

- Calvelli, c. 1943

No. 65, 42, 21
- Positions: Center, Guard, Linebacker

Personal information
- Born: July 16, 1915; Stockton, California, U.S.
- Died: May 17, 1979 (aged 63); San Mateo County, California, U.S.
- Listed height: 5 ft 10 in (1.78 m)
- Listed weight: 189 lb (86 kg)

Career information
- High school: Stockton
- College: Stanford (1936-1938)
- NFL draft: 1939: 11th round, 97th overall pick

Career history
- Detroit Lions (1939–1940); San Francisco Clippers (1946); San Francisco 49ers (1947)

Awards and highlights
- Second-team All-PCC (1938)

Career NFL/AAFC statistics
- Games played: 31
- Games started: 7
- Interceptions: 3
- Stats at Pro Football Reference

Anthony T. Calvelli (July 16, 1915 – May 17, 1979) was an American professional football player and track and field athlete.

== Life and career ==
Calvelli was born in 1915 in Stockton, California, and attended Stockton High School.

Calvelli initially attended San Mateo Junior College and then transferred to Stanford University. He played college football at Stanford from 1936 to 1938.

He was selected by the Detroit Lions with the 97th pick in the 1939 NFL draft. He played for the Lions during the 1939 and 1940 seasons, appearing in 18 games.

In 1941, he was inducted into the Army and played for the Moffett Field football team in 1941. In 1942 and 1943, he played center for the Second Air Force football team, including the undefeated 1942 Second Air Force Bombers football team. In 1944, he served at McClellan Field near Sacramento.

After completing four-and-a-half years of military service, Calvelli returned to professional football. He played for the San Francisco Clippers of the Pacific Coast Professional Football League in 1946 as a player-coach and with the San Francisco 49ers of the All-America Football Conference in 1947.

== Death ==
He died in 1979 at age 63 in San Mateo County, California.
