= Sam Chapman =

American baseball player (1916–2006)

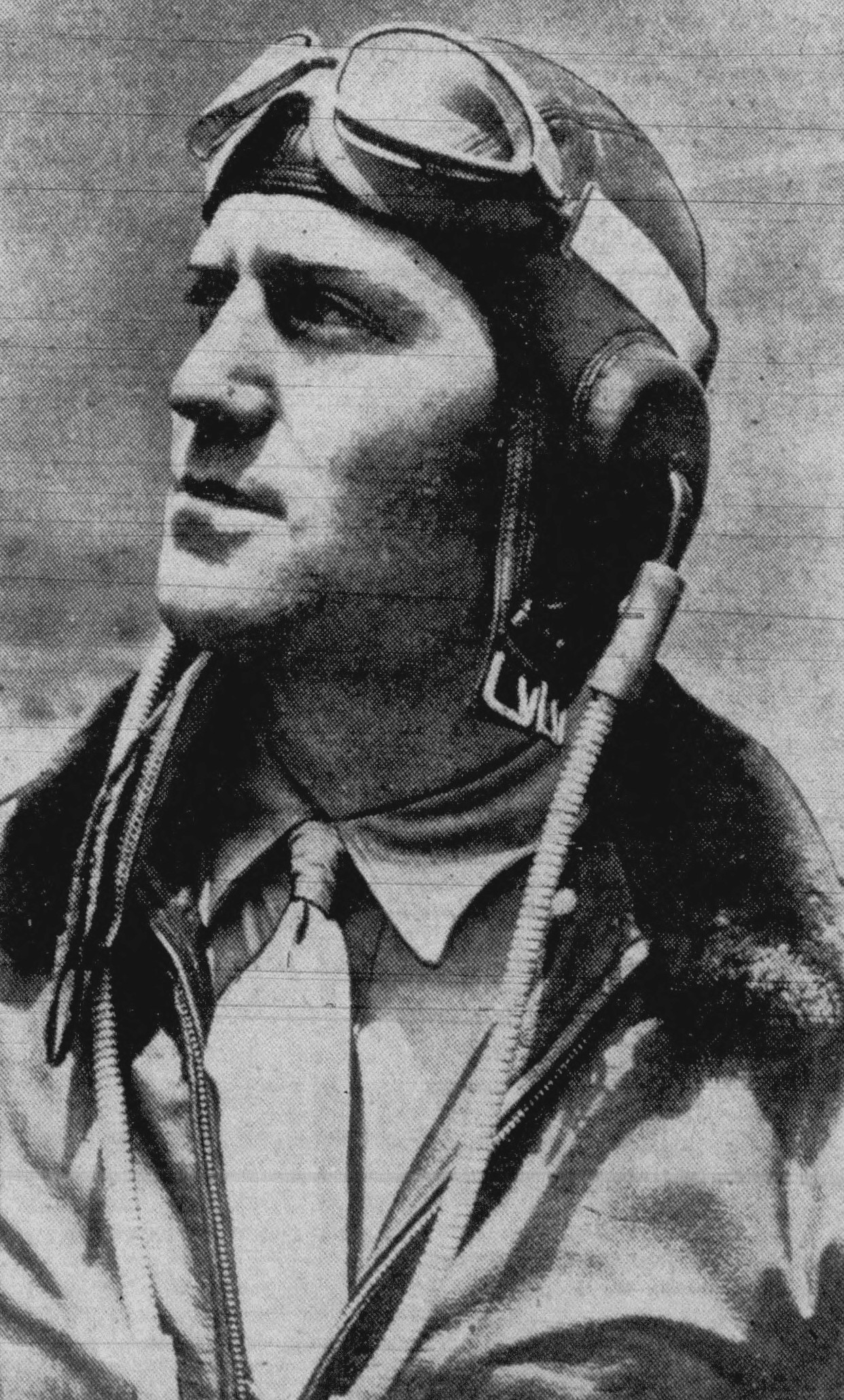
- Chapman, circa 1942
- Center fielder
- Born: April 11, 1916; Tiburon, California, U.S.
- Died: December 22, 2006 (aged 90); Kentfield, California, U.S.
- Batted: Right Threw: Right

MLB debut
- May 16, 1938, for the Philadelphia Athletics

Last MLB appearance
- September 22, 1951, for the Cleveland Indians

MLB statistics
- Batting average: .266
- Home runs: 180
- Runs batted in: 773
- Stats at Baseball Reference

Teams
- Philadelphia Athletics (1938–1941, 1945–1951); Cleveland Indians (1951)

Career highlights and awards
- All-Star (1946); Philadelphia Baseball Wall of Fame
Football career
No. 48
Position	Halfback
Personal information
Listed height	6 ft 0 in (1.83 m)
Listed weight	188 lb (85 kg)
Career information
High school	Tamalpais Union High School
College	Cal (1935–1937)
Awards and highlights
Consensus All-American (1937); First-team All-PCC (1937); 1938 Rose Bowl
College Football Hall of Fame

Samuel Blake Chapman (April 11, 1916 – December 22, 2006) was an American two-sport athletic star who played as a center fielder in Major League Baseball, spending nearly his entire career with the Philadelphia Athletics (1938–1941, 1945–1951). He batted and threw right-handed, leading the American League in putouts four times. He was previously an All-American college football player at the University of California.

== Early life ==
Born in Tiburon, California, Chapman graduated from Tamalpais High School in Mill Valley, California in 1934, with letters in football, baseball, basketball and track.

== College career ==
Going to the university at the suggestion of Tamalpais football coach Roy Riegels, Chapman starred in football for the Golden Bears under head coach Stub Allison, where he was first nicknamed "Sleepy Sam" due to his stolid temperament. He was named an All-American for the 1937 Pacific Coast Conference and national champion "Thunder Team", which went on to win the 1938 Rose Bowl; the last time California has won the game. Later nicknamed the "Tiburon Terror", Chapman was also an All-American college baseball player.

== Professional career ==
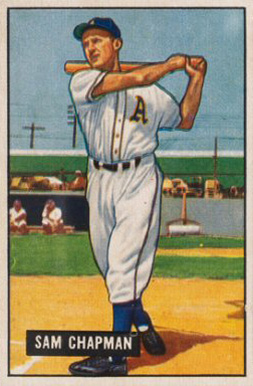
Chapman depicted on a Bowman Gum baseball card in 1951.

Turning down a pro football career after being drafted in the third round of the 1938 NFL draft by the Washington Redskins of the National Football League, he made his debut with the Major Leagues Baseball Philadelphia Athletics on May 16, 1938, shortly after graduation. He played most of the season in left field, moving to center field the following year. As a rookie, he batted .259 with 17 home runs (second on the team to Bob Johnson) and 63 runs batted in. His batting average and RBI total increased steadily in each of the next three campaigns, to .269/64 (1939) and .276/75 (1940) before peaking with a .322 average and 106 RBI in 1941. In the latter year he had his best season, finishing fifth in the AL in both slugging average (.543) and total bases (300), with a career-best 25 home runs. On May 5, 1939, Chapman hit for the cycle against the St. Louis Browns.

He joined the Navy for World War II after the 1941 season, and served as a pilot and flight instructor in Corpus Christi, Texas. He returned to the Athletics in late 1945, and was named to the AL All-Star team in 1946. But he never quite returned to his pre-war level of play; apart from 1949, when he batted .278 with 24 home runs (tied for third in the AL) and 108 RBI (fifth in the AL), he never exceeded a .261 average. He was traded to the Cleveland Indians in May 1951, and ended the year with a .215 batting mark; he left the major leagues at the end of that season, but played three more years for the Oakland Oaks of the Pacific Coast League. In an 11-season major league career, Chapman posted a .266 batting average with 180 home runs, 773 RBI, 754 runs, 1329 hits and 41 stolen bases in 1368 games. Playing at all three outfield positions and first base, Chapman recorded a .972 fielding percentage.

== After baseball ==
After leaving baseball, Chapman became an inspector for the Bay Area Air Pollution Control District. He was elected to the College Football Hall of Fame in 1984, and to the Bay Area Sports Hall of Fame in 1987. In 1999, he was named to the Philadelphia Baseball Wall of Fame. In 2006, the Tiburon Town Council voted to commission a statue of Chapman to be installed at the Tiburon ferry landing. That plan was later adjusted, and in 2012, a plaque honoring Chapman was dedicated at Point Tiburon Plaza.

Chapman died at an assisted-living residence in Kentfield, California, at the age of 90, after suffering from Alzheimer's disease for several years.

== See also ==
- List of Major League Baseball players to hit for the cycle

Achievements
Preceded by Odell Hale	Hitting for the cycle May 5, 1939	Succeeded by Charlie Gehringer
