= Bob Herwig =

American football player (1914–1974)

Profile
- Position: Center

Personal information
- Born: December 12, 1914; Woodford, California, U.S.
- Died: December 14, 1974 (aged 60); Sacramento, California, U.S.

Career information
- College: California
- NFL draft: 1938: 4th round, 30th overall pick

Awards and highlights
- 2× First-team All-American (1936, 1937); 3× First-team All-PCC (1935, 1936, 1937)
- College Football Hall of Fame

Bob Herwig (December 12, 1914 – December 14, 1974) was an American football center. He was selected in the fourth round of the 1938 NFL draft with the 30th overall pick. He was elected to the College Football Hall of Fame in 1964. Until their divorce in 1946, he was married to novelist Kathleen Winsor.
