= John Wysocki =

American football player

Profile
- Position: End

Personal information
- Born: c. 1916; Wilkes-Barre, Pennsylvania, U.S.
- Died: September 23, 1965 (aged 48–49); Philadelphia, Pennsylvania, U.S.

Career information
- High school: Hanover Area School District
- College: Villanova
- NFL draft: 1939: 3rd round, 21st overall pick

Awards and highlights
- 2× First-team All-American (1937, 1938); First-team All-Eastern (1937); Second-team All-Eastern (1938)

John Wysocki (c. 1916 – September 23, 1965) was an American football player who played for Villanova University from 1936 to 1938 and was selected as a first-team All-American at the end position in both 1937 and 1938.

Wysocki first gained national media attention after an October 1937 game in which he scored 19 of Villanova's 20 points (three touchdowns and an extra point) in a 20–0 victory over Manhattan. In November 1937, noted sports writer Alan Gould wrote of Wysocki: "Villanova's sensational John Wysocki, who put on a one man scoring show against Manhattan, had another big afternoon against Detroit." Wysocki was also known as a kick-blocker and had three career touchdowns on blocked kicks. In the 1937 Bacardi Bowl, Villanova was trailing Auburn 7–0 in the fourth quarter, when Wysocki and Valentine Rizzo blocked a kick inside the Auburn 15-yard line, and the kick was recovered by a Villanova lineman for a touchdown that led to the final game score of 7–7. Wysocki repeated as an All-American in 1938 despite suffering injuries that prevented him from playing a full schedule. In November 1938, NEA syndicate sports editor Harry Grayson said the following of the two-time All-American:

"John Wysocki is a raw-boned kid who made more All-America teams last year than did any other end. As a sophomore Wysocki had little polish. He was just a big fellow with a desire to put on bone-crushing blocks, a fervor for knocking people down, and obsessed with the idea that end play should be confined to the opponent's backfield. There was a finesse to his blistering blocking, brisk tackling and uncanny forward pass receiving this year. He gave Maurice (Big Clipper) Smith a chance to turn the foemen's desire to sock Wysocki into a Villanova advantage. Wysocki was all team player. He was the ideal decoy on pass plays and a demon on defense. Wysocki, a Wilkes-Barre boy, played with a pair of ankles that would have benched a less hardy individual."

Wysocki was drafted by the Chicago Bears in the third round (21st pick overall) of the 1939 NFL draft. However, Wysocki instead took a job as a high school teacher and coach. Upon graduating in 1939, Wysocki became a teacher and coach of football, basketball and track at Clifton Heights High School in a suburb of Philadelphia. He later became the football and baseball coach and athletic director at Upper Merion High School in King of Prussia, Pennsylvania, from 1944 to 1946. From 1947 to 1965, he was a sales representative for a distilling firm. He lived in his later years in Highland Park, Pennsylvania, and died in Philadelphia's Osteophathic Hospital at age 49 in 1965. Wysocki was survived by his wife, Mary Wysocki, a son and four daughters.

Wysocki was inducted into the Villanova Walk of Fame in 1994.

== See also ==
- 1938 College Football All-America Team
