= Ed Beinor =

American football player (1917–1991)

No. 73, 45
- Positions: Tackle, Defensive end

Personal information
- Born: November 16, 1917; Harvey, Illinois, U.S.
- Died: January 6, 1991 (aged 73); Edwardsville, Illinois, U.S.
- Listed height: 6 ft 2 in (1.88 m)
- Listed weight: 222 lb (101 kg)

Career information
- High school: Thornton Township (Harvey)
- College: Notre Dame (1935-1938)
- NFL draft: 1939: 6th round, 46th overall pick

Career history
- St. Louis Gunners (1939); Chicago Cardinals (1940–1941); Washington Redskins (1941–1942)

Awards and highlights
- NFL champion (1942); Pro Bowl (1942); Unanimous All-American (1938); First-team All-American (1937)

Career NFL statistics
- Games played: 33
- Games started: 13
- Stats at Pro Football Reference

Joseph Edward Beinor (November 16, 1917 – January 6, 1991) was an American professional football player who was a tackle in the National Football League (NFL). He played college football for the Notre Dame Fighting Irish from 1935 to 1938 and professionally for the St. Louis Gunners (1939), Chicago Cardinals (1940-41), and Washington Redskins (1941).

== Earl years ==
Beinor was born in 1917 in Harvey, Illinois. He attended Thornton Township High School where he played football and baseball and competed in swimming and track meets. He graduated in 1935.

== Notre Dame ==
Beinor enrolled at the University of Notre Dame and played for the Fighting Irish football team from 1935 to 1938. As a sophomore, he was selected by the Newspaper Enterprise Association (NEA) to the 1936 All-Midwest football team. As a junior, he was selected by the NEA and All-America Board (AAB) as a first-team tackle on the 1937 All-America team. As a senior, he starred for the 1938 Notre Dame team that compiled an 8–1 record and was selected as national champion by the Dickinson System. Beinor was a unanimous first-team pick on the 1938 All-America team, receiving first-team honors from, among others, the AAB, Associated Press, United Press, Central Press, Collier's Weekly, NEA, International News Service, Liberty magazine, and The Sporting News.

== Professional football ==
In 1939, Beinor signed with the St. Louis Gunners of the American Football League. He appeared in four games for the Gunners during the 1939 season. He also coached at Thornton Academy in Harvey, Illinois, while playing for the Gunners.

In August 1940, Beinor was acquired by the Chicago Cardinals in a trade with the Brooklyn Dodgers who owned his NFL rights. Chicago coach Jimmy Conzelman traded for Beinor seeking linemen familiar with the Notre Dame system. He appeared in 11 games for the Cardinals in 1940, seven of them as a starter. He continued with the Cardinals at the start of the 1941 season, appearin in seven games, three as a starter.

In early November 1941, the Washington Redskins purchased Beinor from the Cardinals. He appeared in four games for the Redskins in 1941 and returned to the club in 1942, appearing in 11 games, three as a starter.

== Military service ==
In February 1943, Beinor entered the Marine Corps as a lieutenant during World War II. He was assigned to San Diego where he became a pilot. In June 1943, he married Margaret Birkholz at the Notre Dame chapel.

Beinor was assigned for six months to Camp Pendleton where he conducted classes in combat conditioning. He was deployed to the Pacific Theatre of the war in December 1943. Beinor was in charge of maintenance for the Patrol Bomber (PBJ) squadron VMB-423 in the South Pacific. In May 1945, he joined the 1st Marine Air Wing bombing squadron at a welfare and recreation officer.

== Later life ==
After his discharge from the Marines, Beinor worked for the Catholic Welfare Bureau as director of the boys program in Santa Barbara, California. He also served as the line coach for the 1946 Santa Barbara Gauchos football team. In 1947, he was hired as the head football, basketball and track coach at St. Mary's High School in Phoenix, Arizona. After two years at St. Mary's, Beinor left the school to join his father's business in managing a supermarket in Kankakee, Illinois.

Beinor later worked for the Industrial Division of Remington Arms. He retired as the company's national sales manager. He had four children. He died in 1991 at his home in Edwardsville, Illinois.
