= Dick Bassi =

American football player (1915–1973)

No. 35, 36
- Position: Guard

Personal information
- Born: January 1, 1915; San Luis Obispo, California, U.S.
- Died: August 12, 1973 (aged 58); San Francisco, California, U.S.
- Listed height: 5 ft 11 in (1.80 m)
- Listed weight: 214 lb (97 kg)

Career information
- High school: Mission (San Luis Obispo)
- College: Santa Clara (1933-1936)
- NFL draft: 1937: 4th round, 36th overall pick

Career history
- Chicago Bears (1938–1939); Philadelphia Eagles (1940); Pittsburgh Steelers (1941); San Francisco 49ers (1946-1947)

Awards and highlights
- First-team All-Pro (1940); NFL All-Star (1940); First-team All-PCC (1936)

Career NFL/AAFC statistics
- Games played: 57
- Games started: 29
- Stats at Pro Football Reference

Richard Joseph Bassi (January 1, 1915 – August 12, 1973) was an American professional football offensive lineman in the National Football League (NFL) for the Washington Redskins, Chicago Bears, Philadelphia Eagles, and the Pittsburgh Steelers. He also played for the San Francisco 49ers of the All-America Football Conference (AAFC). Bassi played college football at the University of Santa Clara and was drafted in the fourth round of the 1937 NFL draft.
