= Bob MacLeod =

American football and basketball player (1917–2003)

No. 5
- Position: Halfback

Personal information
- Born: October 15, 1917; Glen Ellyn, Illinois, U.S. (Note: MacLeod's draft registration card listed his place of birth as Chicago; Glen Ellyn is a suburb of Chicago and is consistently listed as his place of birth by other sources.)
- Died: January 13, 2003 (aged 85); Santa Monica, California, U.S.
- Listed height: 6 ft 0 in (1.83 m)
- Listed weight: 190 lb (86 kg)

Career information
- High school: Glenbard (Glen Ellyn)
- College: Dartmouth
- NFL draft: 1939: 1st round, 5th overall pick

Career history
- Chicago Bears (1939)

Awards and highlights
- Consensus All-American (1938); Third-team All-American (1937); First-team All-Eastern (1938); Second-team All-Eastern (1937)

Career NFL statistics
- Rushing attempts–yards: 17–88
- Receptions–yards: 10–231
- Touchdowns: 4
- Stats at Pro Football Reference
- College Football Hall of Fame

Robert Fredric MacLeod (Note: Other sources spell his middle name as Frederick.) (October 15, 1917 – January 13, 2003) was an American professional football player who was a halfback for the Chicago Bears of the National Football League (NFL). He played college football for the Dartmouth Big Green in the late 1930s. After serving in the United States Marine Corps during World War II, he had a career in magazine publishing.

He served as a vice president and advertising director at Hearst Publications, later becoming a publisher for the magazines Seventeen and Teen. He was inducted into the College Football Hall of Fame in 1977.

MacLeod died at the age of 85 in January 2003.

== Biography ==
MacLeod attended Glenbard West High School in Illinois, then played college football for the Dartmouth Big Green, where he was a named by several selectors to the 1937 College Football All-America Team and was a consensus selection for the 1938 College Football All-America Team. He was also a selection to the 1938 All-Eastern football team, while serving as team captain for the 1938 Dartmouth Indians, as the team was then known. He finished fourth in that season's Heisman Trophy voting. At the conclusion of his college football career, MacLeod played in the January 1939 edition of the East–West Shrine Game. While in college, he also played on the Dartmouth men's basketball team.

MacLeod was selected in the first round of the 1939 NFL draft by the Brooklyn Dodgers with the fifth overall pick. He was traded to the Chicago Bears for Ray Buivid on September 28, and went on to play in nine games for his new team during the 1939 NFL season with four touchdowns scored. MacLeod also played professional basketball for the Chicago Bruins of the National Basketball League (NBL) during the latter part of the 1939–40 season.

MacLeod served as a pilot in the United States Marine Corps during World War II, reaching the rank of major. After the war, he worked in magazine publishing, serving as a vice-president and advertising director at Hearst Publications. He later was the publisher of Seventeen and Teen magazines.

MacLeod was elected to the College Football Hall of Fame in 1977. He was also inducted to the athletic hall of fame at Dartmouth. MacLeod died in January 2003, aged 85; he was survived by his third wife and four children.
