= 1936 All-Southwest Conference football team =

American college football all-star team

The 1936 All-Southwest Conference football team consists of American football players chosen by various organizations for All-Southwest Conference teams for the 1936 college football season. The selectors for the 1936 season included the Associated Press (AP).

== All Southwest selections ==
=== Backs ===
- Sammy Baugh, TCU (AP-1 [QB])
- Lloyd Russell, Baylor (AP-1 [HB])
- Jack Robbins, Arkansas (AP-1 [HB])
- Hugh Wolfe, Texas (AP-1 [FB])
- Richard Vitek, Texas A&M (AP-2)
- Jim Shockey, Texas A&M (AP-2)
- John Sprague, Southern Methodist (AP-2)
- J. W. Friedman, Rice (AP-2)

=== Ends ===
- Jim Benton, Arkansas (AP-1)
- Walter Roach, Texas Christian (AP-1)
- Billy Dewell, Southern Methodist (AP-2)
- John Morrow, Texas A&M (AP-2)

=== Tackles ===
- Roy Young, Texas A&M (AP-1)
- Ox Parry, Baylor (AP-1)
- Cliff Van Sickle, Arkansas (AP-2)
- John Whitfield, Texas A&M (AP-2)

=== Guards ===
- Joe Routt, Texas A&M (AP-1)
- Paschal Scortino, Southern Methodist (AP-1)
- William Ard, Rice (AP-2)
- Wilbur Harrison, Texas Christian (AP-2)

=== Centers ===
- Charles Deware, Texas A&M (AP-1)
- John Reynolds, Baylor (AP-2)

== Key ==
AP = Associated Press

== See also ==
- 1936 College Football All-America Team
