= 1938 All-Pacific Coast football team =

American all-star college football team

1938 Pacific Coast Conference football standings
	Conf.					Overall
Team	W		L		T	W		L		T
No. 7 USC +	6	–	1	–	0	9	–	2	–	0
No. 14 California +	6	–	1	–	0	10	–	1	–	0
UCLA	4	–	3	–	1	7	–	4	–	1
Oregon State	4	–	3	–	1	5	–	3	–	1
Oregon	4	–	4	–	0	4	–	5	–	0
Washington	3	–	4	–	1	3	–	5	–	1
Idaho	2	–	3	–	1	6	–	3	–	1
Stanford	2	–	5	–	0	3	–	6	–	0
Washington State	1	–	7	–	0	2	–	8	–	0
Montana	0	–	1	–	0	5	–	3	–	1
+ – Conference co-champions; Rankings from AP Poll

The 1938 All-Pacific Coast football team consists of American football players chosen by various organizations for All-Pacific Coast teams for the 1938 college football season. The organizations selecting teams in 1938 included the Associated Press (AP), the International News Service (INS), and the United Press (UP).

The USC Trojans won the Pacific Coast Conference (PCC) championship, compiled a 9–2 record, were ranked No. 7 in the final Ap Poll, and were represented by three players on the first teams selected by AP, INS, or UP. The USC honorees were quarterback Grenny Lansdell (AP, INS, UP), guard Harry Smith (AP, INS, UP), and halfback Bob Hoffman (UP).

California finished second in the PCC with a 10–1 record, were ranked No. 14 in the final AP Poll, and placed four players on the AP, INS or UP first teams. The UCLA honorees were halfback Vic Bottari (AP, INS, UP), fullback Dave Anderson (AP, INS, UP), end Will Dolman (INS), and tackle Dave De Varona (AP, INS, UP).

Only one player from a team outside the PCC received first-team honors. Tackle Alvord Wolff of the Santa Clara Broncos won first-team honors from the AP, INS, and UP.

== All-Pacific Coast selections ==
=== Quarterback ===
- Grenny Lansdell, USC (AP-1; INS-1; UP-1 [back]; NEA-1)
- Ted Gebhardt, Oregon (NEA-2)
- William Paulman, Stanford (NEA-3)

=== Halfbacks ===
- Vic Bottari, California (AP-1; INS-1; UP-1 [back]; NEA-1) (College Football hall of Fame)
- Kenny Washington, UCLA (AP-1; INS-1; NEA-2)
- Bob Hoffman, USC (AP-2; UP-1 [back]; NEA-1)
- Jimmy Johnston, Washington (AP-2; NEA-2)
- Jim Kisselburgh, Oregon State (AP-2; NEA-2)
- Al Braga, San Francisco (AP-2; NEA-3)
- Bill Overlin, UCLA (NEA-3)

=== Fullback ===
- Dave Anderson, California (AP-1; INS-1; UP-1 [back]; NEA-1)
- Merritt, Pomona (NEA-3)

=== Ends ===
- Joe Wendlick, Oregon State (AP-1; INS-1; UP-1; NEA-2)
- Jay MacDowell, Washington (AP-1; UP-1)
- Willard "Will" Dolman, California (AP-2; INS-1; NEA-3)
- Tony Knap, Idaho (AP-2; NEA-1)
- Bill Telesmanic, San Francisco (NEA-1)
- William Anahu, Santa Clara (NEA-2)
- Woody Strode, UCLA (NEA-3)

=== Tackles ===
- Dave De Varona, California (AP-1; INS-1; UP-1; NEA-2)
- Alvord Wolff, Santa Clara (AP-1; INS-1; UP-1; NEA-1)
- Pete Zagar, Stanford (AP-2; NEA-1)
- Mladen Zarubica, UCLA (AP-2; NEA-3)
- Dick Farman, Washington St. (NEA-2)
- George Cantwell, Saint Mary's (NEA-3)

=== Guards ===
- Harry Smith, USC (AP-1; INS-1; UP-1; NEA-1) (College Football Hall of Fame)
- Art Means, Washington (AP-1)
- Steve Slivinski, Washington (AP-2; INS-1; NEA-3)
- Prescott Hutchins, Oregon State (AP-2; UP-1; NEA-1)
- Russ Clarke, Santa Clara (NEA-2)
- Jerry Ginney, Santa Clara (NEA-2)
- Jack Sommers, UCLA (NEA-3)

=== Centers ===
- John Ryland, UCLA (AP-1; INS-1; UP-1; NEA-3)
- John Schiechl, Santa Clara (NEA-1)
- Tony Calvelli, Stanford (AP-2)
- Jerry Dowd, Saint Mary's (NEA-2)

== Key ==
AP = Associated Press

INS = International News Service

UP = United Press

NEA = Newspaper Enterprise Association

== See also ==
- 1938 College Football All-America Team
