= Chuck Sweeney =

American football player and official (1914–1999)

Profile
- Position: End

Personal information
- Born: May 5, 1914; Bloomington, Illinois, U.S.
- Died: August 4, 1999 (aged 85); South Bend, Indiana, U.S.
- Listed height: 6 ft 0 in (1.83 m)
- Listed weight: 190 lb (86 kg)

Career information
- College: University of Notre Dame

Career history
- 1937: Notre Dame

Awards and highlights
- Consensus All-American (1937)

Charles A. "Chuck" Sweeney (May 5, 1914 – August 4, 1999) was an American football end at the University of Notre Dame. He was a consensus All-American in 1937. In later life, he became a National Football League (NFL) game official.

== Playing career ==
Sweeney played for the Notre Dame Fighting Irish football team under coach Elmer Layden during the 1935, 1936 and 1937 seasons. In his senior year he beat out team captain Joe Zwers for a starting position. During the season his play was difference in several Fighting Irish victories including a late safety against Navy and a blocked extra point versus Minnesota. He also almost single-handedly beat Northwestern by blocking a punt for the only score of the game, recovering 2 fumbles, intercepting a pass, and downing a punt at the 1 yard line. For his play, the 6-foot, 190-pound end, he was recognized as a consensus first-team All-American, having received first-team honors from several publications and organizations including the Associated Press (AP), and United Press International (UPI). After the season, he was also invited to participate in several post season All-Star games including the Chicago College All-Star Game and the East-West Shrine Game. In a game that pitted the previous season NFL Champion versus a team of recently graduated college players selected by fans across the country, Sweeney broke the Chicago College All-Star game record for the most votes for a single college player. He helped the College All-Stars beat a Sammy Baugh led Washington Redskins.

== After college ==
After graduating from Notre Dame, he took a job as branch manager at Sinclair Refining Company in South Bend, Indiana. He worked at Sinclair until he retired in 1968. He was drafted by the Green Bay Packers in the 1938 NFL draft. He never played a game in the league but did take part in many games. A few years after taking the job at Sinclair, NFL commissioner and Sweeney's former coach Elmer Layden offered him a job as a game official for the National Football League. He officiated for 25 years including several championship games. One, the 1958 NFL Championship Game, was the first sudden-death overtime game and became widely known as "The Greatest Game Ever Played." At the age of 85, Chuck Sweeney died August 4, 1999, of heart failure in St. Joseph Regional Medical Center in South Bend.
