= Joe Routt =

American football player and soldier (1914–1944)

Profile
- Position: Guard

Personal information
- Born: October 18, 1914; Chappell Hill, Texas, U.S.
- Died: December 10, 1944 (aged 30); Belgium

Career information
- College: Texas A&M
- NFL draft: 1938: 3rd round, 16th overall pick

Awards and highlights
- Consensus All-American (1937); First-team All-American (1936); 2× First-team All-SWC (1936, 1937)
- College Football Hall of Fame

Joe Eugene Routt (October 18, 1914 – December 10, 1944) was an American football player and World War II soldier.

== College ==
The son of Eugene Otis and Annie Belle (Clay) Routt, Routt attended Texas A&M University from 1933 to 1938 and received a degree in animal husbandry. As a guard on the football team, Routt was named to the All-American football teams of 1936 and 1937. He was the first All-American player for A&M. He played on the 1938 College All-Star team in Chicago and in the East-West Shrine Game at San Francisco. Routt was a 3rd round selection (16th overall pick) by the Cleveland Rams in the 1938 NFL draft.

== War and death ==
Routt was commissioned a second lieutenant upon graduation from A&M and went on active duty in the United States Army in March 1942. In 1942 he played for the Army West All-Star football team against professional football teams. As an infantry officer in World War II he received the Bronze Star and Purple Heart. He was a captain and company commander in the Netherlands when he was killed in action on December 10, 1944. He was buried at Margraten, Netherlands. On April 19, 1949, he was reburied at Brenham, Texas.

== Personal ==
Routt was married to Marilyn Maddox on March 1, 1942, and they had two daughters, Marilyn Routt Thomason and Rosanna Routt Sena. Marilyn R. Thomason had two children, Leanne Locke Whitaker and James Thomas Locke. Rosanna had two sons, Leif Devemark and Carl Devemark. Joe was named to the Texas Sports Hall of Fame in 1952 and the College Football Hall of Fame in 1962.
