= Harry Smith (American football) =

American football player (1918–2013)

No. 33
- Positions: Guard, tackle

Personal information
- Born: August 26, 1918; Russellville, Missouri, U.S.
- Died: July 30, 2013 (aged 94); Columbia, Missouri, U.S.
- Listed height: 5 ft 11 in (1.80 m)
- Listed weight: 215 lb (98 kg)

Career information
- High school: Chaffey (Ontario, California)
- College: USC
- NFL draft: 1940: 5th round, 36th overall pick

Career history
- Detroit Lions (1940)

Awards and highlights
- Pro Bowl (1940); Unanimous All-American (1939); First-team All-American (1938); 2× First-team All-PCC (1938, 1939)

Career NFL statistics
- Games played: 10
- Games started: 8
- Stats at Pro Football Reference
- College Football Hall of Fame

Harry Elliott "Blackjack" Smith (August 26, 1918 – July 30, 2013) was an American professional football player who anchored the line from the guard position on the University of Southern California's Rose Bowl teams in 1938 and 1939 seasons, and earned All-American honors each year.

== Early life ==
Smith was born in Russellville, Missouri and played scholastically at Chaffey High School in Ontario, California.

== College career ==
The 1938 team finished 9-2-0 and defeated Duke University. The next season, the Trojans finished 8-0-2 as national champions, including a 14-0 Rose Bowl conquest of the University of Tennessee. USC also defeated Notre Dame University in each of those seasons. Smith was elected to the College Football Hall of Fame in 1955.

Harry Smith also played for USC Rugby during his collegiate career.

== Professional career ==
Following graduation, Smith was selected by the Detroit Lions in the 1940 NFL draft. He played one year for the Lions, earning Pro Bowl honors.

== Coaching career ==
He then served as an assistant coach at University of Missouri and USC before becoming head coach of the Canadian Football League's Saskatchewan Roughriders.

== Death ==
In his last few years Smith had suffered a stroke that saw his health decline. He died in the morning on July 30, 2013, at Columbia, Missouri. He was 94.
