= Milt Popovich =

American football player (1915–2005)

No. 66, 77
- Position: Halfback

Personal information
- Born: December 29, 1913; Butte, Montana, U.S.
- Died: June 23, 2005 (aged 91); Butte, Montana, U.S.
- Listed height: 5 ft 11 in (1.80 m)
- Listed weight: 196 lb (89 kg)

Career information
- High school: Butte
- College: Montana (1934-1937)
- NFL draft: 1938: 2nd round, 15th overall pick

Career history
- Chicago Cardinals (1938–1942)

Awards and highlights
- 2× Second-team All-PCC (1936, 1937)

Career NFL statistics
- Rushing yards: 233
- Rushing average: 3
- Receptions: 10
- Receiving yards: 71
- Stats at Pro Football Reference

Milton John Popovich (December 25, 1915 – June 23, 2005) was a professional American football halfback in the National Football League (NFL). He played with the Chicago Cardinals from 1938 to 1942.

Milt was born Dec. 28, 1915, in Butte, Montana to Joko and Josephine Popovich. Milt was the youngest of eight children born into the Popovich family with only two surviving siblings; his older brother Gene, and older sister Zorka.

Milt graduated from Butte High School in 1934. Popovich "Popo" was a prominent athlete at Butte High competing in football, basketball and track. He played on the 1932 and 1933 state championship basketball teams at Butte High. He also was on the 1933 track team when it took the state crown. Milt scored 12 points at that state meet, the most of any athlete competing. Yet, it was in football that Milton, known also as the "Butte Bullet", really made his name. He returned the opening kickoff and ran 89 yards for a touchdown in the 1933 city title game against Butte Central. It was the first time this ever occurred in their long, bitter rivalry. Popo was named first-team All-State the following season. He took his talents to the University of Montana where he was a star running back for the Grizzlies. Milton ran two punt returns for scores in a win over Montana State in the annual Bobcat-Grizzly game played in Butte in 1936. Milt led the Grizzlies to a 7-1 record in 1937 and was named an All-American. Popo played in the 1938 East-West Shrine football game (tie score 0 to 0). He was drafted by and played seven years with the Chicago Cardinals (Arizona Cardinals) of the National Football League. He finished his career as a player-coach for the Seattle Bombers.

On Nov. 28, 1946 Milt married the love of his life, Ruth Milovich, in Reno, Nevada. Milt took Ruth back to Butte for the "honeymoon" and the two never left the Mining City where they carried on their honeymoon for 60 years.

Milt devoted his working life to serving Butte as a proud fireman in the finest department in the state. For his outstanding lifetime athletic achievements, Milt was one of the original members selected for the Butte Sports Hall of Fame in 1987. In 1993, he was inducted into the University of Montana Grizzly Sports Hall of Fame. In 2000, he was chosen by Sports Illustrated as one of the 50 "Greatest Sports Figures of the Century" from each of the 50 states.

Milt had three children: Sandra, Mitriann, a former Miss Montana, and Milton II. He also has three grandchildren, Alexandra H. Antonioli , Gabrielle Antonioli, and Mia Vogel.
