= Billy Dewell =

American football player (1917–2000)

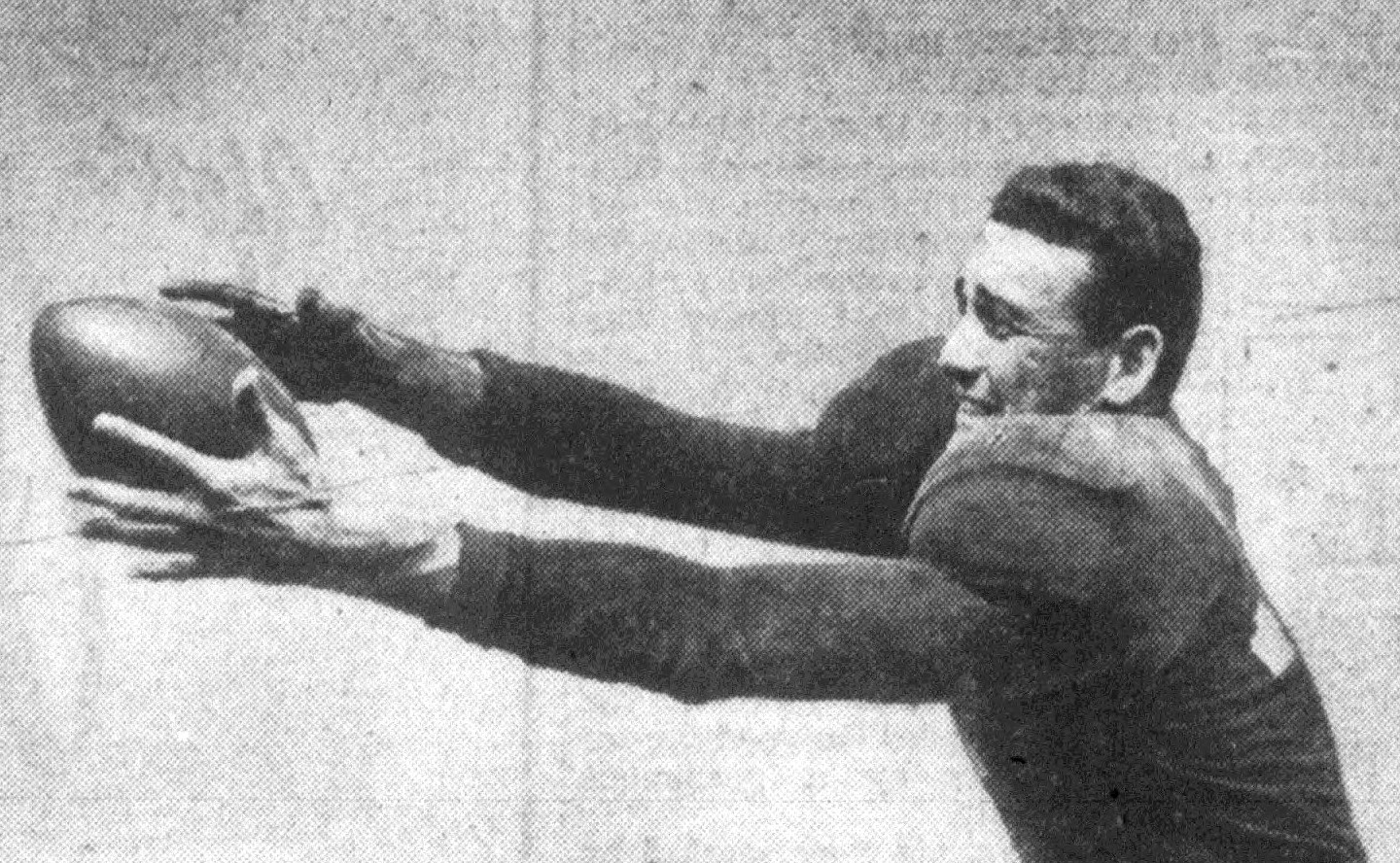
- Dewell, circa 1947

No. 7, 41
- Position: End

Personal information
- Born: January 2, 1917; Concordia, Kansas, U.S.
- Died: January 19, 2000 (aged 83); Dallas, Texas, U.S.
- Listed height: 6 ft 4 in (1.93 m)
- Listed weight: 208 lb (94 kg)

Career information
- High school: Dodge City (KS)
- College: SMU (1935-1938)
- NFL draft: 1939: 4th round, 29th overall pick

Career history

Playing
- Chicago Cardinals (1940–1941, 1945–1949)

Coaching
- Chicago Cardinals (1950) Ends coach

Awards and highlights
- NFL champion (1947); Pro Bowl (1941); First-team All-SWC (1938); Second-team All-SWC (1936); SMU athletics HOF inductee (1984)

Career NFL statistics
- Receptions: 177
- Receiving yards: 2,657
- Receiving touchdowns: 17
- Stats at Pro Football Reference

William Austin Dewell (January 2, 1917 – January 19, 2000) was an American professional football player. He was selected in the fourth round of the 1939 NFL draft. He played and coached professionally for the Chicago Cardinals of the National Football League (NFL).He served in World War II for the United States Navy before rejoining the Cardinals in 1945. Dewell was inducted into the SMU athletics hall of fame in 1984.

== NFL career statistics ==
Legend
	Won the NFL Championship
	Led the league
**Bold**	Career high

=== Regular season ===
Year	Team	Games		Receiving				
Year	Team	GP	GS	Rec	Yds	Avg	Lng	TD
1940	CRD	4	3	2	29	14.5	-	0
1941	CRD	11	8	27	362	13.4	30	1
1945	CRD	9	5	26	370	14.2	70	1
1946	CRD	11	6	27	**643**	**23.8**	**82**	**7**
1947	CRD	11	9	**42**	576	13.7	46	4
1948	CRD	11	11	33	442	13.4	48	2
1949	CRD	12	9	20	235	11.8	25	2
		69	51	177	2,657	15.0	82	17

=== Playoffs ===
Year	Team	Games		Receiving				
Year	Team	GP	GS	Rec	Yds	Avg	Lng	TD
1947	CRD	1	0	**1**	**38**	**38.0**	**38**	0
1948	CRD	1	0	**1**	16	16.0	16	0
		2	0	2	54	27.0	38	0
