= Roy Young (American football) =

American football player (1917–1987)

No. 46
- Position: Offensive lineman

Personal information
- Born: September 11, 1917; Abbeville, Louisiana, U.S.
- Died: May 5, 1987 (aged 69); Scottsdale, Arizona, U.S.
- Listed height: 6 ft 2 in (1.88 m)
- Listed weight: 215 lb (98 kg)

Career information
- College: Texas A&M
- NFL draft: 1938: 7th round, 59th overall pick

Career history
- Washington Redskins (1938)

Awards and highlights
- First-team All-SWC (1936); Second-team All-SWC (1937)

Career NFL statistics
- Games played: 9
- Games started: 1
- Stats at Pro Football Reference

Roy O. Young (September 11, 1917 – May 5, 1987) was an American professional football offensive lineman in the National Football League (NFL) for the Washington Redskins. He played college football at Texas A&M University and was drafted in the seventh round of the 1938 NFL draft. While playing with the Texas A&M Aggies, Young was named to the All-Southwest Conference team in 1936 and 1937. After playing for the Redskins for 1938, he retired from football and became a professional boxer.

After retiring from sports, Young became a doctor and moved to Scottsdale, Arizona. He died on May 5, 1987.
