= Joe Delaney (tackle) =

American football player (1917–2002)

No. 24
- Position: Tackle

Personal information
- Born: March 25, 1917; Providence, Rhode Island, U.S.
- Died: December 17, 2002 (aged 85)
- Listed height: 6 ft 4 in (1.93 m)
- Listed weight: 230 lb (104 kg)

Career information
- High school: La Salle Academy (Providence, Rhode Island)
- College: Holy Cross
- NFL draft: 1939: 5th round, 36th overall pick

Career history
- Chicago Bears (1939)*; Providence Steam Roller (1940); Worcester Panthers (1942); Hartford Blues (1942)
- * Offseason or practice squad member only

Awards and highlights
- Third-team All-American (1938); First-team All-Eastern (1938)

Joseph Patrick Delaney (March 25, 1917 – December 17, 2002) was an American football tackle. He played college football for Holy Cross, being named All-American as a senior, and was selected in the 5th round (36th overall) of the 1939 NFL draft by the Chicago Bears. He later played minor league football with the Providence Steam Roller, Worcester Panthers, and Hartford Blues.

== Early life and education ==
Delaney was born on March 25, 1917, in Providence, Rhode Island, and grew up there. He attended La Salle Academy in Providence, playing tackle on their football team and pitcher on their baseball team. After graduating, Detroit baseball scouts told him, "Cut out football. If you don't, it'll cut you out—your fast ball will disappear as those back shoulder muscles contract." He listened, and then enrolled at College of the Holy Cross.

When Holy Cross football coach Eddie Anderson met Delaney and was told what the baseball scouts said, he replied, "Who says football will spoil your arm? Anyhow, you're so big I doubt anything can happen to you." He ended up playing both sports, with the college's football and baseball teams. As a senior in football, he was a first-team All-America selection by The New York Sun. As a senior in baseball, he finished the season winning six out of the final seven games.

In a game against Temple, Delaney, playing on the defensive line, broke through the offensive line into the backfield so many times that opposing coach Fred H. Swan sent him a Temple jersey to wear after the first half ended.

He was a member of the 1938 College All-Star team that played the Philadelphia Eagles in a preseason exhibition game.

== Professional career ==
After finishing he senior season, Delaney was selected in the fifth round (36th overall) of the 1939 NFL draft by the Chicago Bears. He did not play with Chicago, and instead was a member of the minor league Providence Steamroller, appearing in seven games during the 1940 season. He finished his career following the 1942 season, in which, he played for the independent Worcester Panthers and Hartford Blues.

== Death ==
Delaney died on December 17, 2002, at the age of 85.
