= Jerry Dennerlein =

American football player (1915–1966)

No. 55, 68, 66
- Position: Offensive tackle

Personal information
- Born: December 1, 1915; Ambridge, Pennsylvania, U.S.
- Died: July 29, 1966 (aged 50); Los Angeles County, California, U.S.
- Listed height: 6 ft 2 in (1.88 m)
- Listed weight: 235 lb (107 kg)

Career information
- High school: James A. Garfield (East Los Angeles, California)
- College: St. Mary's College
- NFL draft: 1937: 3rd round, 24th overall pick

Career history
- New York Giants (1937); Los Angeles Bulldogs (1939); New York Giants (1940)

Awards and highlights
- Second-team All-PCC (1936)

Career NFL statistics
- Games played: 22
- Games started: 9
- Stats at Pro Football Reference

Gerald E. Dennerlein (December 1, 1915 – July 29, 1966) was an American professional football player. He was selected 24th overall in the third round of the 1937 NFL draft. He played a total of 22 games and started nine for the New York Giants.
