= Vic Bottari =

American football player (1916–2003)

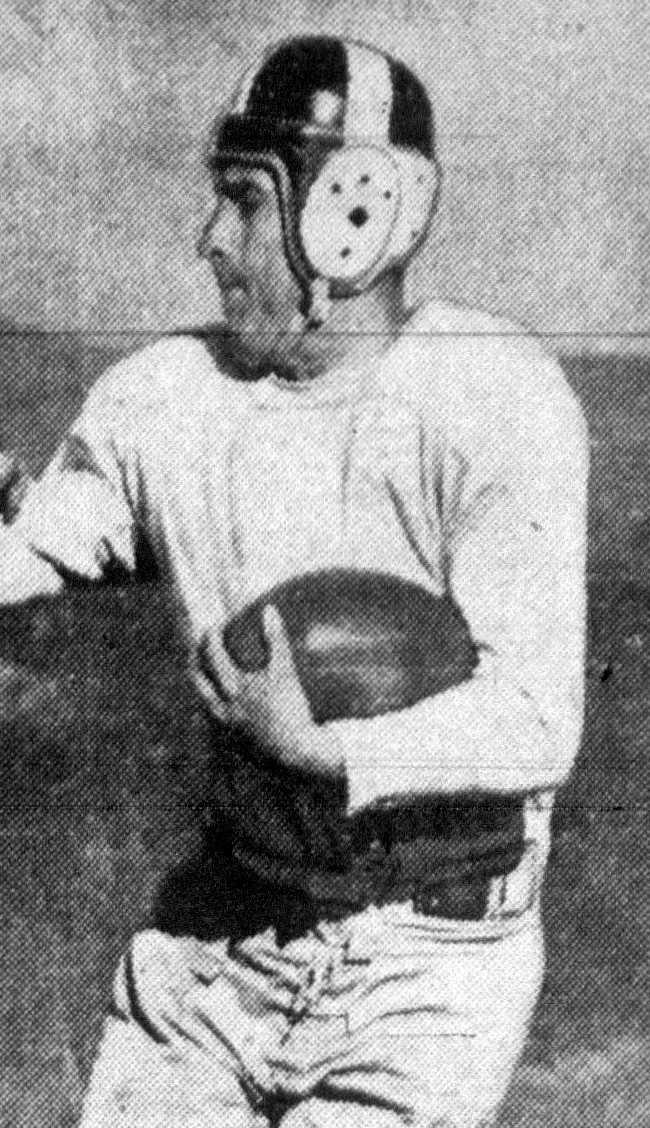
- Bottari, circa 1942

Profile
- Position: Halfback

Personal information
- Born: December 21, 1916; Vallejo, California, U.S.
- Died: January 6, 2003 (aged 86); Walnut Creek, California, U.S.

Career information
- College: University of California
- NFL draft: 1939: 4th round, 30th overall pick

Awards and highlights
- Consensus All-American (1938); Second-team All-American (1937); 2× First-team All-PCC (1937, 1938)
- College Football Hall of Fame

Vic Bottari (December 21, 1916 – January 6, 2003) was an American football player. Bottari, nicknamed "Vallejo Vic" attended the University of California, Berkeley and starred as a halfback, leading the Golden Bears to a win in the 1938 Rose Bowl where he was voted the most valuable player of the game. He scored both of the Bears' touchdowns and rushed for 137 yards on 34 carries in their 13–0 win over Alabama in the Rose Bowl. In his three years with Cal, he gained 1,536 yards on 388 carries, which ranks him 15th on Cal's all-time rushing list. He also scored 22 touchdowns and kicked 13 PATs, and his 145 career points puts him 14th on the school's all-time charts. He was the captain of Cal's 1937 "Thunder Team" that won the school's last national football championship with a 10-0-1 record. He was a two-time first-team all-Pacific Coast Conference halfback and is in three halls of fame: the College Football Hall of Fame (1981), University of California Athletic Hall of Fame (1986), and Rose Bowl Hall of Fame (1996). He was also voted a first-team member of the Pacific-10 Conference's "All Century Team" in 2001. Bottari was drafted by the Brooklyn Dodgers (NFL) in the fourth round in 1939 but chose not to pursue a career in the NFL.
