= Wayne Goddard =

American football player and coach (1914–1984)

Biographical details
- Born: June 9, 1914; Anna, Illinois, U.S.
- Died: September 22, 1984 (aged 70)

Playing career
- 1936–1937: Southeast Missouri State
- 1942: Pensacola NAS
- Position: Tackle

Coaching career (HC unless noted)
- c. 1940: Dexter HS (MO)
- 1947–1951: Southeast Missouri State

Head coaching record
- Overall: 10–30–5 (college)

Wayne Goddard (June 9, 1914 – September 22, 1984) was an American football player and coach. He served as the head football coach at his alma mater, Southeast Missouri State University, from 1947 to 1951, compiling a record of 10–30–5. Goddard coached at Dexter High School in Dexter, Missouri before serving the United States Navy officer during World War II. While in the service, he played for the 1942 Pensacola Naval Air Station Goslings football team. Goddard was later an assistant principal at Cape Central High School in Cape Girardeau, Missouri.

== Head coaching record ==
=== College ===
Year	Team	Overall	Conference	Standing	Bowl/playoffs
Southeast Missouri State Indians (Missouri Intercollegiate Athletic Association) (1947–1951)
1947	Southeast Missouri State	2–6–1	1–3–1	5th	
1948	Southeast Missouri State	0–7–2	0–3–2	5th	
1949	Southeast Missouri State	2–7	0–5	6th	
1950	Southeast Missouri State	4–5–1	1–3–1	T–4th	
1951	Southeast Missouri State	2–5–1	0–4–1	T–5th	
Southeast Missouri State:		10–30–5	2–18–5		
Total:		10–30–5			
