= Joe Gray (American football) =

American football player (1915–1999)

Profile
- Position: Back

Personal information
- Born: November 8, 1915; Aurora, Oregon, U.S.
- Died: May 11, 1999 (aged 83); Marion, Oregon, U.S.
- Listed height: 5 ft 11 in (1.80 m)
- Listed weight: 186 lb (84 kg)

Career information
- High school: Roosevelt (Portland, Oregon)
- College: Oregon State (1934–1937)

Awards and highlights
- Second-team All-American (1937); First-team All-PCC (1937); Second-team All-PCC (1936)

Joseph Arlo Gray (November 8, 1915 – May 11, 1999) was an American football player. He attended Roosevelt High School in Oregon, where he was a two-time first-team All-Portland Interscholastic League (PIL) selection, and enrolled at Oregon State University in 1934. Nicknamed "the Gray Ghost", he played college football for the Oregon State Beavers and was a first-team All-Pacific Coast Conference (PCC) performer and second-team All-American. He was selected in the first round (10th overall) of the 1938 NFL draft by the Chicago Bears, but never played professionally.

== Early life ==
Gray was born on November 8, 1915, in Aurora, Oregon, and moved to Portland as a youth. He attended Roosevelt High School Portland, winning three varsity letters on the football team and two on the baseball team, being a two-time first-team All-Portland Interscholastic League (PIL) selection as a back.

== College career ==
In 1934, Gray enrolled at Oregon State University, where he played football and baseball. Up until his freshman year of college, his passing was reported to be poor, but "[coach] Lon Stiner took him in hand, told him to hold his balance and keep on the ground when tossing and now [Gray] can pass anything from a milk bottle to a watermelon," one newspaper commented. By his sophomore year, Gray had developed into a "sensational halfback", being described as "outstanding in every game" while being noted as a triple-threat man who could pass, run and punt. He tied for the scoring lead in the Pacific Coast Conference (PCC) and helped the Oregon State Beavers compile a record of 6–4–1. The United Press (UP) named Gray an honorable mention on their 1935 All-Coast football team.

In summing up Gray's sophomore season, the Associated Press (AP) reported that he was "probably the most outstanding all-around sophomore halfback in the coast conference ... His passing arm was the magic wand of the Beaver's aerial circus, and he scintillated at ball carrying. Seldom did he fail to twist loose at least once a game for a kick return of 50 yards or more. His change of pace and ability to remain on his feet carried him farther than many speedier backs." That year, he received the nickname "the Gray Ghost" from an announcer, which he afterwards was commonly known by. A reporter for the Corvallis Gazette-Times said it was "Not a bad name, either, as many opposing tacklers are willing to bet that Joe is just an apparition who can't be brought down." He received his nickname because, as one said, "He was an elusive runner, it was like he wasn't there anymore, like a ghost."

Gray remained one of the best players in the conference in 1937, being among their leading scorers again as the Beavers ultimately compiled a record of 4–6. United Press (UP) noted that he was "the coast's best passer and ... a grand open-field runner." At the end of the season, Gray was named second-team All-Coast, despite having been injured for a portion of the year.

Gray continued to be a top player as a senior in 1937. He was considered one of the greatest backs produced in the Northwest in years and was praised as the best Oregon State runner and passer in history up to that point. The Oakland Post Enquirer stated that he "personally acts as 75 percent of the Oregon State offense" and called him as being "in a class by himself". The Los Angeles Times described him as having a "heart of a true champion" and praised him for having "just about everything", noting that "He's a rugged, 60-minute player, kicks well, can run with the ball and plays a bang-up game on defense. But it is when he starts pitching the pigskin that Joe really comes into his own. For two years he's been baffling rival teams with his sharpshooting and it is a dull afternoon when Joe doesn't turn one or more throws into a touchdown." Although the Beavers only compiled a record of 3–3–3, Gray was named first-team All-Coast and was selected a second-team All-American. He played at the Chicago College All-Star Game and at the East–West Shrine Bowl.

== Later life and death ==
Gray was selected in the first round of the 1938 NFL draft – 10th overall by the Chicago Bears – but declined their offer to work as an agriculture inspector, in part from a knee injury. He worked with the Oregon Department of Agriculture starting in 1938 and remained there until retiring in 1980, having risen to the post of administrator of the food and dairy division. He served in the United States Army and was awarded a Bronze Star Medal. Gray was a member of the Elks Lodge and the American and Western Food and Drug Officials Administration. He was married and had two children. Gray died on May 11, 1999, at the age of 83, in Marion, Oregon.

Gray was inducted into the Oregon State Athletic Hall of Fame in 1991 and into the Portland Interscholastic League Hall of Fame in 2020.
