= George Karamatic =

American football player (1917–2008)

No. 20, 53
- Positions: Fullback, defensive back

Personal information
- Born: February 22, 1917; Seattle, Washington, U.S.
- Died: December 5, 2008 (aged 91); Santa Maria, California, U.S.
- Listed height: 5 ft 8 in (1.73 m)
- Listed weight: 187 lb (85 kg)

Career information
- High school: J.M. Weatherwax (Aberdeen, Washington)
- College: Gonzaga
- NFL draft: 1938: 1st round, 8th overall pick

Career history
- Washington Redskins (1938); Los Angeles Bulldogs (1939); Milwaukee Chiefs (1940)

Awards and highlights
- First-team All-American (1937); 2× First-team All-PCC (1936, 1937)

Career NFL statistics
- Rushing yards: 185
- Rushing average: 3.7
- Receptions: 4
- Receiving yards: 99
- Total touchdowns: 1
- Stats at Pro Football Reference

George Goyoslav Karamatic Jr. (February 22, 1917 – December 5, 2008) was an American professional football running back in the National Football League (NFL) for the Washington Redskins. He played college football at Gonzaga University and was drafted in the first round (eighth overall) of the 1938 NFL draft by the New York Giants. Karamatic died in Santa Maria, California.
