= Doug Oldershaw =

American football player (1915–1995)

No. 39
- Positions: Guard, end

Personal information
- Born: July 6, 1915; Bakersfield, California, U.S.
- Died: October 30, 1995 (aged 80); Laguna Beach, California, U.S.
- Listed height: 6 ft 0 in (1.83 m)
- Listed weight: 195 lb (88 kg)

Career information
- College: Santa Barbara State
- NFL draft: 1938: 11th round, 98th overall pick

Career history

Playing
- New York Giants (1939–1941)

Coaching
- Army (1942; assistant)

Awards and highlights
- Pro Bowl (1940); 2× First-team Little All-American (1936, 1937)

Career NFL statistics
- Interceptions: 5
- Touchdowns: 1
- Stats at Pro Football Reference

Douglas C. Oldershaw (July 6, 1915 – October 30, 1995) was an American professional football guard and end who played in the National Football League (NFL) for three seasons with the New York Giants. He was selected 98th overall in the 11th round of the 1938 NFL draft. Oldershaw played college football at Santa Barbara State College (now known as the University of California, Santa Barbara). In 1942, he was hired an assistant football coach at the United States Military Academy to serve under head coach Earl Blaik.
