= 1937 All-America college football team =

Official list of the best college football players of 1937

The 1937 All-America college football team is composed of college football players who were selected as All-Americans by various organizations and writers that chose All-America college football teams in 1937. The ten selectors recognized by the NCAA as "official" for the 1937 season are (1) Collier's Weekly, as selected by Grantland Rice, (2) the Associated Press (AP), (3) the United Press (UP), (4) the All-America Board (AAB), (5) the International News Service (INS), (6) Liberty magazine, (7) the Newspaper Enterprise Association (NEA), (8) Newsweek, (9) the North American Newspaper Alliance (NANA), and (10) the Sporting News (SN).

== Consensus All-Americans ==
For the year 1937, the NCAA recognizes 10 published All-American teams as "official" designations for purposes of its consensus determinations. The following chart identifies the NCAA-recognized consensus All-Americans and displays which first-team designations they received.

Name	Position	School	Number	Official	Other
Clint Frank	Quarterback	Yale	10/10	AAB, AP, COL, INS, LIB, NANA, NEA, NW, SN, UP	CP, CE, WC
Marshall Goldberg	Halfback	Pittsburgh	9/10	AAB, AP, COL, INS, NANA, NEA, NW, SN, UP	CP, CE, WC
Joe Routt	Guard	Texas A&M	8/10	AP, COL, LIB, NANA, NEA, NW, SN, UP	CP, CE
Byron White	Halfback	Colorado	7/10	AP, COL, INS, LIB, NEA, SN, UP	CP, CE
Sam Chapman	Fullback	California	6/10	AAB, AP, COL, LIB, NANA, UP	WC
Ed Franco	Tackle	Fordham	5/10	AP, COL, NW, SN, UP	CP
Leroy Monsky	Guard	Alabama	5/10	AAB, AP, COL, LIB, SN	WC
Andy Bershak	End	North Carolina	4/10	COL, NANA, NEA, SN	CP, CE
Alex Wojciechowicz	Center	Fordham	4/10	INS, NANA, SN, UP	CE, WC
Chuck Sweeney	End	Notre Dame	3/10	AP, NW, UP	CP
Tony Matisi	Tackle	Pittsburgh	3/10	AAB, AP, NANA	CE, WC

== All-American selections for 1937 ==
=== Ends ===
- Chuck Sweeney, Notre Dame (AP-1; UP-1; INS-3; CP-1; NW; NEA-3)
- Andy Bershak, North Carolina (AP-3; UP-2; COL-1; INS-3; NEA-1; CP-1; CE-1; SN; NANA)
- John Wysocki, Villanova (UP-1; INS-1; NEA-1; CP-3; LIB)
- Raymond King, Minnesota ( UP-3; INS-1; CP-2; CE-1; WC-1; AAB; NW; NEA-2 [t])
- Jerome H. Holland, Cornell (College Football Hall of Fame) (AP-1; COL-1)
- Bill Daddio, Pittsburgh (UP-3; SN)
- Perry Schwartz, California (WC-1; AAB)
- Frank Souchak, Pittsburgh (UP-2; INS-2; LIB; NEA-2)
- Bill Jordan, Georgia Tech (AP-2; INS-2; NEA-3)
- Jim Benton, Arkansas (AP-3; CP-3; NANA)
- Elmer Dohmann, Nebraska (CP-2)
- Pete Smith, Oklahoma (AP-2)

=== Tackles ===
- Ed Franco, Fordham (College Football Hall of Fame) (AP-1; UP-1; COL-1; CP-1; SN; NW; NEA-2)
- Tony Matisi, Pittsburgh (AP-1; UP-2; INS-2; CE-1; WC-1; AAB; NANA; NEA-2 [e])
- Bruiser Kinard, Ole Miss (College and Pro Football Hall of Fame) (AP-3; UP-1; INS-1; NEA-1; CE-1; SN)
- Ed Beinor, Notre Dame (UP-3; NEA-1; CP-3; WC-1; AAB)
- Vic Markov, Washington (College Football Hall of Fame) (AP-2; COL-1; INS-1; LIB)
- Jim Ryba, Alabama (INS-3; CP-1)
- I. B. Hale, TCU (LIB)
- Al Babartsky, Fordham (INS-3; NANA)
- Fred Shirey, Nebraska (UP-2; INS-2; NW; NEA-3 [e])
- John Mellus, Villanova (AP-2)
- Alexander Kevorkian, Harvard (CP-2)
- Eddie Gatto, LSU (AP-3)
- Jim Tipton, Alabama (UP-3)
- Ted Doyle, Nebraska (CP-3)
- Alvord Wolff, Santa Clara (NEA-3)

=== Guards ===
- Joe Routt, Texas A&M (College Football Hall of Fame) (AP-1; UP-1; COL-1; INS-2; NEA-1; CP-1; CE-1; SN; LIB; NANA; NW)
- Leroy Monsky, Alabama (AP-1; UP-2; COL-1; INS-2; CP-2; WC-1; SN; AAB; LIB; NEA-2)
- Vard Stockton, California (UP-1; INS-1; NEA-1; CP-1; NANA)
- Gust Zarnas, Ohio State (WC-1; AAB; NW)
- Phil Dougherty, Santa Clara (INS-1; CP-3)
- Hedwig, California (CE-1)
- Frank Twedell, Minnesota (AP-2; UP-2; INS-3; CP-3; NEA-3)
- Gus Zitrides, Dartmouth (AP-3; INS-3)
- Jim Sivell, Auburn (AP-3; CP-2)
- Albin Lezouski, Pittsburgh (AP-2)
- Norman Buckner, Tulane (UP-3)
- Steve Slivinski, Washington (NEA-2; UP-3)
- Joe Nee, Harvard (CP-3)
- Joe Ruetz, Notre Dame (NEA-3)

=== Centers ===
- Alex Wojciechowicz, Fordham (College and Pro Football Hall of Fame) (AP-3; UP-1; INS-1; CP-2; CE-1; WC-1; SN; AAB; NANA; NEA-3)
- Carl Hinkle, Vanderbilt (College Football Hall of Fame) (AP-1; UP-2; COL-1; INS-2; CP-1; LIB)
- Charley Brock, Nebraska (NEA-1)
- Bob Herwig, California (College Football Hall of Fame) (NEA-2; UP-3; INS-3; NW)
- Ki Aldrich, TCU (College Football Hall of Fame) (first pick in the 1939 NFL draft) (AP-2)

=== Quarterbacks ===
- Clint Frank, Yale (College Football Hall of Fame) ( AP-1; UP-1; COL-1; INS-1; NEA-1 [hb]; CP-1; CE-1; WC-1; SN; AAB; LIB; NANA; NW)
- Sid Luckman, Columbia (College and Pro Football Hall of Fame) (second pick in the 1939 NFL draft) (AP-3; UP-2; NEA-3 [hb])
- Andy Puplis, Notre Dame (UP-3; CP-3)
- Nile Kinnick, Iowa (NEA-3)
- Elmore Hackney, Duke (INS-2; NEA-2 [qb])

=== Halfbacks ===
- Marshall Goldberg, Pittsburgh (College Football Hall of Fame) (AP-1; UP-1 [fb] ; COL-1; INS-1 [hb]; NEA-1; CP-1; CE-1; WC-1; SN; AAB; NANA; NW)
- Byron White, Colorado (College Football Hall of Fame) (AP-1; UP-1; COL-1; INS-1; NEA-1 [qb]; CP-1; CE-1; SN; LIB)
- Corbett Davis, Indiana (first pick in the 1938 NFL draft) (INS-2 [fb]; CP-1; WC-1; AAB [fb]; LIB; NANA; NW; NEA-2 [fb])
- Davey O'Brien, TCU (College Football Hall of Fame) (AP-2; UP-3; CP-2 [qb])
- John Pingel, Michigan State (College Football Hall of Fame) ((AP-2; INS-3; CP-3)
- Bill Osmanski, Holy Cross (College Football Hall of Fame) (AP-2; INS-2; NEA-3 [fb])
- Bob MacLeod, Dartmouth (College Football Hall of Fame) ((AP-3; CP-2)
- Hugh Wolfe, Texas (UP-2)
- Joe Gray, Oregon State (AP-2)
- Jim McDonald, Ohio State (second pick in the 1938 NFL draft) (AP-3)
- Vic Bottari, California (College Football Hall of Fame) (UP-3; NEA-2)
- Andy Stopper, Villanova (INS-3)
- William "Bullet Bill" Patterson, Baylor (CP-3)
- Danny Dalfonso, University of Buffalo

=== Fullbacks ===
- Sam Chapman, California (College Football Hall of Fame) (AP-1; UP-1; COL-1; INS-2; CP-2 [fb]; WC-1; AAB [hb]; LIB; NANA; NEA-3 [hb])
- Joe Kilgrow, Alabama (UP-2 [hb]; INS-1; CP-2 [hb]; SN; NW; NEA-2 [hb])
- George Karamatic, Gonzaga (UP-2; NEA-1)
- Johnny "Jelly Belly" Meek, California (INS-3 [qb]; CE-1)
- Cecil Isbell, Purdue (College Football Hall of Fame) (AP-3; UP-3; CP-3)
- George "Pinky" Rohm, LSU (INS-3)

== Key ==
Bold = Consensus All-American

- -1 – First-team selection
- -2 – Second-team selection
- -3 – Third-team selection

=== Official selectors ===
- AAB = All-America Board
- AP = Associated Press
- COL = Collier's Weekly
- INS = International News Service
- LIB = Liberty magazine
- NANA = North American Newspaper Alliance
- NEA = Newspaper Enterprise Association
- NW = Newsweek
- SN = The Sporting News
- UP = United Press, "selected by United Press sports writers, aided by 12 of the nation's foremost coaches"

=== Other selectors ===
- CP = Central Press Association: "Chosen by more than 30 captains of leading universities and college teams in every part of the country, the eighth annual Captain's All-American is presented herewith."
- CE = Collyer's Eye, selected by "sixty-seven nationally prominent football coaches, representing every major institution of learning, conference and district in the United States"
- WC = Walter Camp Football Foundation

== See also ==
- 1937 Little All-America college football team
- 1937 All-Big Six Conference football team
- 1937 All-Big Ten Conference football team
- 1937 All-Pacific Coast Conference football team
- 1937 All-SEC football team
