= Marshall Goldberg =

American football player (1917–2006)

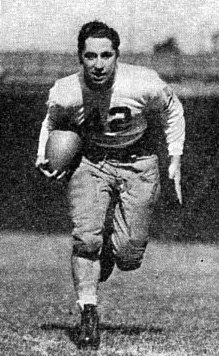
- Goldberg with the Pittsburgh Panthers in 1938

No. 42, 89, 99
- Positions: Back, Return specialist

Personal information
- Born: October 24, 1917; Elkins, West Virginia, U.S.
- Died: April 3, 2006 (aged 88); Chicago, Illinois, U.S.
- Listed height: 5 ft 11 in (1.80 m)
- Listed weight: 190 lb (86 kg)

Career information
- High school: Elkins
- College: Pittsburgh (1936–1938)
- NFL draft: 1939: 2nd round, 12th overall pick

Career history

Playing
- Chicago Cardinals (1939–1943; 1946–1948)

Coaching
- Chicago Cardinals (1949) Assistant coach

Awards and highlights
- NFL champion (1947); Second-team All-Pro (1941); NFL All-Star (1941); 2× NFL kickoff return yards leader (1941, 1942); NFL interceptions co-leader (1941); Arizona Cardinals Ring of Honor; Arizona Cardinals No. 99 retired; National champion (1937); Eastern champion (1937); Unanimous All-American (1938); Consensus All-American (1937); 2× First-team All-Eastern (1937, 1938); Second-team All-Eastern (1936); Pittsburgh Panthers No. 42 retired

Career NFL statistics
- Rushing yards: 1,644
- Rushing average: 3.5
- Rushing touchdowns: 11
- Receptions: 60
- Receiving yards: 775
- Receiving touchdowns: 5
- Return yards: 1,083
- Return touchdowns: 1
- Military career
- Allegiance: United States
- Branch: United States Navy
- Service years: 1943–1945
- Rank: Lieutenant
- Stats at Pro Football Reference
- College Football Hall of Fame

Marshall "Biggie" Goldberg (October 24, 1917 – April 3, 2006) was an American professional football back and return specialist who played for the Chicago Cardinals of the National Football League (NFL). He played college football as a halfback and fullback for the Pittsburgh Panthers. At Pittsburgh, Goldberg was twice recognized as a consensus All-American, and played on two national championship teams under head coach Jock Sutherland. Goldberg played for the Cardinals for eight seasons from 1939 to 1948, with an interruption during World War II, and was a four-time All-Pro. He was inducted into the College Football Hall of Fame in 1958.

== Early life ==
Goldberg was born in Elkins, West Virginia, to a Jewish family. Goldberg's father Sol emigrated from Romania to Cumberland, Maryland, where he met and married Rebecca (Becky) Fram, daughter of a Cumberland shoemaker. Family lore has it that Sol Goldberg and Becky's brother, Benjamin, were friends. The couple settled in the small mountain community of Elkins, West Virginia, some 170 miles (270 km) from Pittsburgh, where they set up a ladies clothing store.

Goldberg attended Elkins High School, where he was captain of the basketball, football, and track teams. He was named All-State in all three sports.

== College career ==
At the University of Pittsburgh, under coach Jock Sutherland, he led the Pitt Panthers to back-to-back national championships in 1936 and 1937. Goldberg's 1936 team won the 1937 Rose Bowl. He finished third in the Heisman Trophy voting in 1937 and was runner-up for the Heisman in 1938. He was also an All-American in both 1937 and 1938, first as a halfback and then as a fullback. During his Pitt career he amassed 1,957 rushing yards, a school record that stood until 1974 when Tony Dorsett surpassed it. Goldberg was part of Pitt's legendary Dream Backfield along with Dick Cassiano, John 'Chick' Chickerneo, & Curly Stebbins. Some experts consider Pitt's Dream Backfield superior to the more famous Four Horsemen of Notre Dame.

== Professional career ==
Goldberg was drafted in the second round of the 1939 NFL Draft. After college Goldberg played in the National Football League for the Chicago Cardinals from 1939 to 1943, interrupted by his service during World War II in the United States Navy in a special unit that was a forerunner of the Navy SEALs, in the South Pacific, and again from 1946 to 1948. The team won the NFL Championship in 1947, and won their division the following year. Goldberg was a four-time NFL All-Pro.

Goldberg joined the Navy in 1943 and spent two years in the South Pacific rising to the rank of lieutenant. He worked in the insurance industry after his football career ended. In 1965, he took over a machine parts company, Marshall Goldberg Machine Tools Ltd., of Rosemont, Illinois.

== NFL career statistics ==
Legend
	Won the NFL Championship
**Bold**	Career high

Year	Team	Games		Rushing				Receiving			
Year	Team	GP	GS	Att	Yds	Avg	TD	Rec	Yds	Avg	TD
1939	CRD	10	8	56	152	2.7	2	5	90	18.0	**1**
1940	CRD	11	7	87	325	3.7	2	2	29	14.5	**1**
1941	CRD	11	10	**117**	**427**	3.6	**3**	16	**313**	**19.6**	**1**
1942	CRD	11	7	116	369	3.2	1	9	108	12.0	0
1943	CRD	1	1	6	6	1.0	0	4	31	7.8	**1**
1946	CRD	10	8	43	210	**4.9**	**3**	**17**	152	8.9	**1**
1947	CRD	12	10	51	155	3.0	0	7	52	7.4	0
1948	CRD	11	0	0	0	0.0	0	0	0	0.0	0
		77	51	476	1,644	3.5	11	60	775	12.9	5

== Honors and death ==
Goldberg was elected by Sports Illustrated to the 1930s College Football Team of the Decade. In 1958, he was enshrined in the College Football Hall of Fame and several other halls of fame, including that of the City of Pittsburgh, the West Virginia Sports Writers Hall of Fame, and the National Jewish Sports Hall of Fame.

Goldberg died in 2006 at age 88 at a nursing home in Chicago. Following his death, his daughter, Ellen Tullos, and his widow, Rita Goldberg, helped to set up The Marshall Goldberg Traumatic Brain Injury Fund at The University of Illinois at Chicago. Goldberg had sustained a number of concussions during his career, which the family felt contributed to difficulties later in his life. This fund has been instrumental in bringing attention to the problem of head injury in athletes. On August 24, 2007, Goldberg and Emmitt Thomas were selected by the Pro Football Hall of Fame's Seniors Committee as finalists for election into the Hall of Fame with the Class of 2008 but was not selected. The Professional Football Researchers Association named Goldberg to the PFRA Hall of Very Good Class of 2007.

His jersey number 99 was retired by the Arizona Cardinals, and he is in the Arizona Cardinals Ring of Honor. On March 2, 2021, Goldberg's daughter gave her blessing to former Houston Texans defensive end J. J. Watt to wear the previously retired number 99.

== See also ==
- List of select Jewish football players
