= 1938 All-America college football team =

Official list of the best college football players of 1938

The 1938 All-America college football team is composed of college football players who were selected as All-Americans by various organizations and writers that chose All-America college football teams in 1938. The nine selectors recognized by the NCAA as "official" for the 1938 season are (1) Collier's Weekly, as selected by Grantland Rice, (2) the Associated Press, (3) the United Press, (4) the All-America Board, (5) the International News Service (INS), (6) Liberty magazine, (7) the Newspaper Enterprise Association (NEA), (8) Newsweek, and (9) the Sporting News.

Four players were unanimous All-Americans on all of the major All-American teams: TCU quarterback (and 1938 Heisman Trophy winner) Davey O'Brien, Pittsburgh fullback Marshall Goldberg, Michigan guard Ralph Heikkinen and Notre Dame tackle Ed Beinor.

== Consensus All-Americans ==
For the year 1938, the NCAA recognizes nine published All-American teams as "official" designations for purposes of its consensus determinations. The following chart identifies the NCAA-recognized consensus All-Americans and displays which first-team designations they received.

Name	Position	School	Number	Official	Other
Ed Beinor	Tackle	Notre Dame	9/9	AAB, AP, CO, INS, LIB, NEA, NW, SN, UP	CP, DT, ID, NYS, PW, WC
Ralph Heikkinen	Guard	Michigan	9/9	AAB, AP, CO, INS, LIB, NEA, NW, SN, UP	CP, DT, NYS, PW, WC
Davey O'Brien	Quarterback	TCU	9/9	AAB, AP, CO, INS, LIB, NEA, NW, SN, UP	CP, DT, NYS, PW, WC
Marshall Goldberg	Fullback	Pittsburgh	9/9	AAB, AP, CO, INS, LIB, NEA, NW, SN, UP	CP, ID, NYS, PW, WC
Waddy Young	End	Oklahoma	6/9	AP, CO, INS, LIB, NEA, NW	CP, DT, ID, NYS, PW, WC
Bob MacLeod	Halfback	Dartmouth	6/9	AAB, CO, INS, LIB, NEA, NW	NYS, PW, WC
Alvord Wolff	Tackle	Santa Clara	6/9	AP, INS, NEA, NW, SN, UP	PW
Ki Aldrich	Center	TCU	5/9	AP, CO, NW, SN, UP	DT, NYS
Vic Bottari	Halfback	California	4/9	AAB, CO, NW, SN	CP, DT, ID, WC
Jerome H. Holland	End	Cornell	3/9	AP, NW, SN	ID
Bowden Wyatt	End	Tennessee	2/9	AAB, CO	NYS
Parker Hall	Halfback	Ole Miss	2/9	AP, UP	NYS
Ed Bock	Guard	Iowa State	3/9	AP, LIB, NEA	--

== All-American selections for 1938 ==
=== Ends ===
- Jerome H. Holland, Cornell (College Football Hall of Fame) (AP-1; NEA-2; NW; SN; ID-1)
- Bowden Wyatt, Tennessee (AAB; AP-2; CO-1; NEA-2; NYS-1)
- Waddy Young, Oklahoma (College Football Hall of Fame) (AP-1; CP-1; CO-1; NEA-1; NYS-1; WC-1; INS; LIB; NW; ID-1; DT; PW)
- Earl Brown, Notre Dame (AAB; AP-2; NEA-3; WC-1; LIB; ID-2; DT)
- Bill Daddio, Pittsburgh (UP-1; SN; AP-3)
- John Wysocki, Villanova (UP-1; CP-1; NEA-1; ID-2; PW)
- Howard Weiss, Wisconsin (NEA-2 [fullback]; INS; ID-1 [halfback])
- John Shirk, Oklahoma (NEA-3)
- Sam Boyd, Baylor (AP-3)

=== Tackles ===
- Ed Beinor, Notre Dame (AAB; AP-1; UP-1; CP-1; CO-1; NEA-1; NYS-1; WC-1; INS; LIB; NW; SN; ID-1; DT; PW);
- Alvord Wolff, Santa Clara (AP-1; UP-1; NEA-1; INS; NW; SN; ID-2; PW)
- William McKeever, Cornell (CO-1; DT; AP-3)
- A. Sidney Roth, Cornell (AP-2 [guard]; CO-1, (NYS-1) [guard])
- I. B. Hale, TCU (AP-2; NEA-2; LIB; ID-1)
- Bo Russell, Auburn (AP-2)
- Bob Voigts, Northwestern (AAB; WC-1)
- Joe Delaney, Holy Cross (NEA-3; NYS-1)
- Steve Maronic, North Carolina (NEA-2; CP-1; AP-3)
- Eddie Gatto, LSU (ID-2)
- Joe Boyd, Texas A&M (NEA-3)

=== Guards ===
- Ralph Heikkinen, Michigan (AAB; AP-1; UP-1; CP-1; CO-1; NEA-1; NYS-1; WC-1; INS; LIB; NW; SN; ID-2; DT; PW)
- Ed Bock, Iowa State (College Football Hall of Fame) (AP-1; NEA-1; LIB; ID-2)
- Bob Suffridge, Tennessee (UP-1; NEA-2; AP-3) (College Football Hall of Fame)
- Frank Twedell, Minnesota (AP-2; NEA-2; INS; SN; ID-1; PW)
- Harry Smith, USC (AAB; NEA-3; WC-1; NW; DT)
- Gus Zitrides, Dartmouth (CP-1; ID-1)
- Matt Landry, Rice (NEA-3)
- Vaughn Lloyd, BYU (AP-3)

=== Centers ===
- Ki Aldrich, TCU (College Football Hall of Fame) (AP-1; UP-1; CO-1; NEA-2; NYS-1; NW; SN; ID-2; DT)
- Dan Hill, Duke (College Football Hall of Fame) (AAB; AP-2; CP-1; NEA-1; WC-1; INS; LIB; PW)
- John Ryland, UCLA (AP-3)
- Charley Brock, Nebraska (NEA-3; ID-1)

=== Quarterbacks ===
- Davey O'Brien, TCU (College Football Hall of Fame) (AAB; AP-1; UP-1; CP-1; CO-1; NEA-1; NYS-1; WC-1; INS; LIB; NW; SN; ID-2; DT; PW)
- Sid Luckman, Columbia (AP-2; SN)
- George Cafego, Tennessee (College Football Hall of Fame) (AP-2; CP-1; NEA-1; LIB; ID-1; DT; PW)
- Grenny Lansdell, USC (NEA-2)
- Everett Kischer, Iowa State (NEA-3)

=== Halfbacks ===
- Bob MacLeod, Dartmouth (College Football Hall of Fame) (AAB; AP-3; CO-1; NEA-1; NYS-1; WC-1; INS; LIB; NW; ID-2; PW)
- Vic Bottari, California (College Football Hall of Fame) (AAB; AP-2; CP-1; CO-1; NEA-2; WC-1; NW; SN; ID-1; DT)
- Parker Hall, Ole Miss (College Football Hall of Fame) (AP-1; UP-1; NYS-1)
- John Pingel, Michigan State (College Football Hall of Fame) (AP-1; NEA-2; INS; DT)
- Eric Tipton, Duke (UP-1)
- Billy Patterson, Baylor (AP-2)
- Merl Condit, Carnegie Tech (ID-2)
- Bill Osmanski, Holy Cross (ID-2)
- Hugh McCullough, Oklahoma (NEA-3)
- Paul Christman, Missouri (NEA-3)
- Warren Brunner, Tulane (AP-3)
- Paul Shu, VMI (AP-3)
- Howard Weiss, Wisconsin (AP-3)

=== Fullbacks ===
- Marshall Goldberg, Pittsburgh (College Football Hall of Fame) (AAB; AP-1; UP-1; CP-1; CO-1; NEA-1; NYS-1; WC-1; INS; LIB; NW; SN; ID-1; PW)
- John McLaughry, Brown (NEA-3)

== Key ==
Bold = Consensus All-American

- -1 – First-team selection
- -2 – Second-team selection
- -3 – Third-team selection

=== Official selections ===
- AAB = All-America Board
- AP = Associated Press
- CO = Collier's Weekly, selected by Grantland Rice
- INS = International News Service
- LIB = Liberty magazine
- NEA = NEA Sports Syndicate
- NW = Newsweek
- SN = Sporting News
- UP = United Press

=== Other selections ===
- CP = Central Press Association, selected by the captains of more than 50 football teams across the country
- DT = Detroit Times by J.R. Gnau
- ID = Irving Dix
- NYS = New York Sun
- WC = Walter Camp Football Foundation
- AR = Albert Richard
- PW = Paul Williamson

== See also ==
- 1938 Little All-America college football team
- 1938 All-Big Six Conference football team
- 1938 All-Big Ten Conference football team
- 1938 All-Pacific Coast Conference football team
- 1938 All-SEC football team
