= Vic Markov =

American football player (1915–1998)

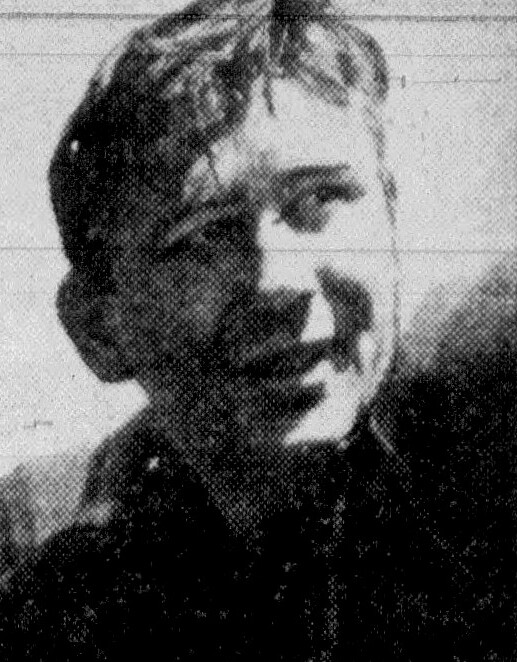
- Markov in 1942

No. 12
- Position: Offensive tackle

Personal information
- Born: December 28, 1915; Chicago, Illinois, U.S.
- Died: December 7, 1998 (aged 82); Seattle, Washington, U.S.
- Listed height: 6 ft 0 in (1.83 m)
- Listed weight: 215 lb (98 kg)

Career information
- College: Washington
- NFL draft: 1938: 4th round, 26th overall pick

Career history
- Cleveland Rams (1938)

Awards and highlights
- First-team All-American (1937); First-team All-PCC (1937)

Career NFL statistics
- Games played: 10
- Games started: 4
- Stats at Pro Football Reference
- College Football Hall of Fame

Victor William Markov (December 28, 1915 – December 7, 1998) was an American professional football player. He played college football for the Washington Huskies. He was elected to the College Football Hall of Fame in 1976. Markov was of Croat origin.

Markov was a unanimous choice as a lineman on the university's centennial team. He earned nine varsity letters in football, wrestling and track and field. After college, he was drafted in the fourth round of the 1938 NFL Draft. He played professional football with the Cleveland Rams in the National Football League before joining the Army.

During World War II, he landed at Normandy as a company commander with Gen. George Patton's Third Army. He earned the Bronze Star, the Purple Heart and five battle stars while fighting in the Battles of the Bulge and the Ardennes.
