= Lambs Farm =

Non-profit organization in Illinois, US

Coordinates: 42°16′44″N 87°54′39″W

Lambs Farm is a non-profit organization near Libertyville, Illinois, that provides vocational and residential services for over 250 adults with developmental disabilities. Located on a 72-acre (290,000 m^{2}) campus, Lambs Farm includes several family attractions, such as a petting zoo, a pet shop, a miniature golf course, several small amusement rides, a restaurant, a thrift shop, a country store and a bakery. Lambs Farm community members work at these attractions, or at a nearby vocational center.

Lambs Farm was formed in the 1960s by Corrine Owen and Robert Terese. Owen and Terese had been teaching at a school for adults with developmental disabilities, and were discouraged by the limited opportunities available to such people. In 1961, they opened a pet store near Chicago's Gold Coast and employed twelve of their students, who enthusiastically helped tend to the animals. Four years later, Owen and Therese acquired a farm near Libertyville with the help of W. Clement Stone and began developing the current Lambs Farm facility. By the late 1980s, Lambs Farm was hosting over 300,000 visitors a year, making it the third most popular attraction in Lake County, Illinois (behind Great America and the Ravinia Festival).

The farm takes its name from John 21:15, in which Jesus tells St. Peter, "Feed my lambs."
