= Pro Football Illustrated =

American sports magazine

Pro Football Illustrated was an American sports magazine on professional American football. It was published from the 1940s into the 1970s.

== History and profile ==
Pro Football Illustrated was established in 1941. The magazine was based in Morris, Illinois. It was among the first magazines to extensively cover professional football. From 1943 to 1948 the magazine selected an All-Pro team.

== All-time All-NFL team ==
In 1947, Pro Football Illustrated selected an all-time All-NFL team composed of players who were no longer active entering the season. Players whose careers peaked before 1921, including Jim Thorpe, were excluded from consideration.

All-Time All-NFL Team
Name
Red Badgro
Johnny Blood
Carl Brumbaugh
Cub Buck
Ernie Caddel
Guy Chamberlin
George Christensen
Dutch Clark
Ed Danowski
LaVern Dilweg
Paddy Driscoll
Red Dunn
Jug Earp
Ox Emerson
Turk Edwards
Ray Flaherty
Benny Friedman
Danny Fortmann
Butch Gibson
Red Grange
Ace Gutowsky
Duke Hanny
Ed Healey
Mel Hein
Pete Henry
Bill Hewitt
Clarke Hinkle
Cal Hubbard
Don Hutson
Cecil Isbell
Joe Kopcha
Verne Lewellen
Tuffy Leemans
Link Lyman
Jack Manders
Mike Michalske
Bronko Nagurski
Ernie Nevers
Harry Newman
Curly Oden
Duke Osborn
Duke Slater
Clyde Smith
Gus Sonnenberg
Joe Stydahar
George Trafton
Mule Wilson
Wildcat Wilson
Swede Youngstrom
