= 1937 All-Pro Team =

Official list of the best NFL players in 1937

The 1937 All-Pro Team consisted of American football players chosen by various selectors for the All-Pro team of the National Football League (NFL) for the 1937 NFL season. Teams were selected by, among others, the NFL coaches (NFL), the International News Service (INS), the United Press (UP), Collyer's Eye (CE), and the New York Daily News (NYDN).

Four players were selected for the first team by all five selectors: Detroit Lions quarterback Dutch Clark; Green Bay Packers fullback Clarke Hinkle; Washington Redskins tackle Turk Edwards; and Chicago Bears guard George Musso. Three others were named to the first team by four selectors: Washington Redskins Sammy Baugh (NFL, INS, UP, NYDN; selected as a halfback); Chicago Cardinals end Gaynell Tinsley (NFL, UP, CE, NYDN); and Chicago Bears tackle Joe Stydahar (NFL, UP, CE, NYDN). Three more were selected by three selectors: Washington Redskins halfback Cliff Battles (NFL, INS, NYDN); Green Bay Packers end Don Hutson (INS, CE, NYDN); and New York Giants center Mel Hein (NFL, INS, NYDN).

== Team ==
Position	Player	Team	Selector(s)
Quarterback	Sammy Baugh	Washington Redskins	NFL-1, INS-1, UP-1, NYDN-1
Quarterback	Dutch Clark	Detroit Lions	NFL-1, INS-1, UP-1, CE-1, NYDN-1
Quarterback	Ed Danowski	New York Giants	NFL-2
Quarterback	Ace Parker	Brooklyn Dodgers	INS-2
Halfback	Cliff Battles	Washington Redskins	NFL-1, INS-1, NYDN-1
Halfback	Jack Manders	Chicago Bears	UP-1, CE-1
Halfback	Tuffy Leemans	New York Giants	NFL-2
Halfback	Ernie Caddel	Detroit Lions	NFL-2
Halfback	Johnny Gildea	Pittsburgh Pirates	INS-2
Halfback	Ace Gutowsky	Detroit Lions	INS-2
Fullback	Clarke Hinkle	Green Bay Packers	NFL-1, INS-1, UP-1, CE-1, NYDN-1
Fullback	Bronko Nagurski	Chicago Bears	NFL-2, CE-1
Fullback	Ray Nolting	Chicago Bears	INS-2
End	Gaynell Tinsley	Chicago Cardinals	NFL-1, UP-1, CE-1, NYDN-1
End	Don Hutson	Green Bay Packers	NFL-2, INS-1, CE-1, NYDN-1
End	Bill Hewitt	Philadelphia Eagles	NFL-1, INS-1
End	Ed Klewicki	Detroit Lions	UP-1
End	Milt Gantenbein	Green Bay Packers	NFL-2
Tackle	Turk Edwards	Washington Redskins	NFL-1, INS-1, UP-1, CE-1, NYDN-1
Tackle	Joe Stydahar	Chicago Bears	NFL-1, UP-1, CE-1, NYDN-1
Tackle	Ed Widseth	New York Giants	NFL-2, INS-1
Tackle	Ernie Smith	Green Bay Packers	NFL-2
Guard	George Musso	Chicago Bears	NFL-1, INS-1, UP-1, CE-1, NYDN-1
Guard	Lon Evans	Green Bay Packers	NFL-1, UP-1
Guard	Ox Emerson	Detroit Lions	INS-1
Guard	Johnny Dell Isola	New York Giants	NFL-2, CE-1
Guard	Dan Fortmann	Chicago Bears	NFL-2, NYDN-1
Center	Mel Hein	New York Giants	NFL-1, INS-1, NYDN-1
Center	Mike Basrak	Pittsburgh Pirates	UP-1
Center	Frank Bausch	Chicago Bears	NFL-2, CE-1
