= 1936 All-Pro Team =

Official list of the best NFL players in 1936

The 1936 All-Pro Team consisted of American football players chosen by various selectors for the All-Pro team of the National Football League (NFL) for the 1936 NFL season. Teams were selected by, among others, the NFL coaches (NFL), the United Press (UP), Collyer's Eye (CE), and the Chicago Daily News (CDN).

Four players were selected for the first team by all four selectors: Detroit Lions quarterback Dutch Clark; Boston Redskins halfback Cliff Battles; Chicago Bears end Bill Hewitt; and Green Bay Packers guard Lon Evans. Three others were selected for the first team by three selectors: Chicago Bears fullback Bronko Nagurski; Boston Redskins tackle Turk Edwards; and New York Giants center Mel Hein.

== Team ==
Position	Player	Team	Selector(s)
Quarterback	Dutch Clark	Detroit Lions	NFL-1, UP-1, CE-1, CDN-1
Quarterback	Arnie Herber	Green Bay Packers	NFL-2, CE-2, CDN-1
Quarterback	Riley Smith	Boston Redskins	NFL-2
Quarterback	Bernie Masterson	Chicago Bears	CDN-2
Halfback	Cliff Battles	Boston Redskins	NFL-1, UP-1, CE-1, CDN-1
Halfback	Tuffy Leemans	New York Giants	NFL-1, UP-2 [quarterback], CE-1, CDN-2
Halfback	Ernie Caddel	Detroit Lions	NFL-2, CDN-2
Halfback	Beattie Feathers	Chicago Bears	UP-2, CE-2
Halfback	George Grosvenor	Chicago Cardinals	UP-2
Halfback	Ralph Kercheval	Brooklyn Dodgers	CE-2
Fullback	Bronko Nagurski	Chicago Bears	NFL-2, UP-1, CE-1, CDN-1
Fullback	Clarke Hinkle	Green Bay Packers	NFL-1, UP-1
Fullback	Ace Gutowsky	Detroit Lions	UP-2, CE-2, CDN-2
End	Bill Hewitt	Chicago Bears	NFL-1, UP-1, CE-1, CDN-1
End	Milt Gantenbein	Green Bay Packers	NFL-2, UP-1, CE-2, CDN-1
End	Don Hutson	Green Bay Packers	NFL-1, UP-2, CE-1, CDN-2
End	Bill Smith	Chicago Cardinals	NFL-2, UP-2
End	Joe Carter	Philadelphia Eagles	CE-2, CDN-2
Tackle	Turk Edwards	Boston Redskins	NFL-1, UP-1, CDN-1
Tackle	Ernie Smith	Green Bay Packers	NFL-1, UP-1
Tackle	Joe Stydahar	Chicago Bears	NFL-2, UP-2, CE-1, CDN-2
Tackle	George Christensen	Detroit Lions	NFL-2, CDN-1
Tackle	Jack Johnson	Detroit Lions	CE-1
Tackle	Armand Niccolai	Pittsburgh Pirates	UP-2
Tackle	Jim MacMurdo	Philadelphia Eagles	CE-2
Tackle	Ade Schwammel	Green Bay Packers	CE-2
Tackle	Bill Lee	Brooklyn Dodgers	CDN-2
Guard	Lon Evans	Green Bay Packers	NFL-1, UP-1, CE-1, CDN-1
Guard	Ox Emerson	Detroit Lions	NFL-1, UP-1, CE-2
Guard	George Rado	Pittsburgh Pirates	CE-1, CDN-2
Guard	Bree Cuppoletti	Chicago Cardinals	NFL-2, UP-2, CDN-1
Guard	Dan Fortmann	Chicago Bears	NFL-2, UP-2
Guard	Ed Kahn	Boston Redskins	CE-2
Guard	Les Olsson	Boston Redskins	CDN-2
Center	Mel Hein	New York Giants	NFL-1, UP-2, CE-1, CDN-1
Center	Frank Bausch	Boston Redskins	NFL-2, UP-1, CE-2
Center	Ed Kawal	Chicago Bears	CDN-2
