= 1938 All-Pro Team =

American football team

The 1938 All-Pro Team consisted of American football players chosen by various selectors for the All-Pro team of the National Football League (NFL) for the 1938 NFL season. Teams were selected by, among others, the National Professional Football Writers Association (PFW), the United Press (UP), the International News Service (INS), Collyer's Eye (CE), and the New York Daily News (NYDN).

Players displayed in bold were consensus first-team selections. Four players were selected for the first team by all five selectors: New York Giants halfback Ed Danowski; Green Bay Packers fullback Clarke Hinkle; New York Giants tackle Ed Widseth; and Chicago Bears guard Dan Fortmann. Another two were selected for the first team by four selectors: Brooklyn Dodgers quarterback Ace Parker (PFW, UP, INS, NYDN); Pittsburgh Pirates halfback Byron White (PFW, UP, INS, CE); and Green Bay Packers end Don Hutson (PFW, UP, INS, NYDN). Five players were selected for the first team by three selectors: Chicago Cardinals end Gaynell Tinsley (PFW, INS, CE); Philadelphia Eagles end Bill Hewitt (UP, CE, NYDN); Chicago Bears tackle Joe Stydahar (UP, INS, NYDN); Green Bay Packers guard Russ Letlow (PFW, INS, CE); and New York Giants center Mel Hein (UP, INS, NYDN).

== Team ==
Position	Player	Team	Selector(s)
Quarterback	**Ace Parker**	Brooklyn Dodgers	PFW-1, UP-1, INS-1, CE-2, NYDN-1
Quarterback	**Ed Danowski**	New York Giants	PFW-1, UP-1, INS-1, CE-1, NYDN-1
Quarterback	Sammy Baugh	Washington Redskins	PFW-2, UP-2, CE-2
Quarterback	Riley Smith	Washington Redskins	INS-2
Halfback	**Byron White**	Pittsburgh Pirates	PFW-1, UP-1, INS-1, CE-1, NYDN-2
Halfback	Cecil Isbell	Green Bay Packers	PFW-2, UP-2, INS-2, NYDN-2
Halfback	Tuffy Leemans	New York Giants	PFW-2, UP-2, CE-2, NYDN-2
Halfback	Ward Cuff	New York Giants	INS-2
Halfback	Lloyd Cardwell	Detroit Lions	NYDN-2
Fullback	**Clarke Hinkle**	Green Bay Packers	PFW-1, UP-1, INS-1, CE-1, NYDN-1
Fullback	Bill Shepherd	Detroit Lions	PFW-2, INS-2, CE-1, NYDN-1
Fullback	Ace Gutowsky	Detroit Lions	UP-2
Fullback	Johnny Drake	Cleveland Rams	CE-2
End	**Don Hutson**	Green Bay Packers	PFW-1, UP-1, INS-1, NYDN-1
End	**Gaynell Tinsley**	Chicago Cardinals	PFW-1, UP-2, INS-1, CE-1, NYDN-2
End	**Bill Hewitt**	Philadelphia Eagles	PFW-2, UP-1, INS-2, CE-1, NYDN-1
End	Joe Carter	Philadelphia Eagles	PFW-2, NYDN-2
End	Milt Gantenbein	Green Bay Packers	UP-2
End	Jim Poole	New York Giants	INS-2
End	Ed Klewicki	Detroit Lions	CE-2
End	Bill Smith	Chicago Cardinals	CE-2
Tackle	**Ed Widseth**	New York Giants	PFW-1, UP-1, INS-1, CE-1, NYDN-1
Tackle	**Joe Stydahar**	Chicago Bears	PFW-2, UP-1, INS-1, CE-2, NYDN-1
Tackle	Bruiser Kinard	Brooklyn Dodgers	PFW-1, UP-2, INS-2, NYDN-2
Tackle	Turk Edwards	Washington Redskins	PFW-2, CE-1, NYDN-2
Tackle	Conway Baker	Chicago Cardinals	UP-2
Tackle	Jack Johnson	Detroit Lions	INS-2
Guard	**Dan Fortmann**	Chicago Bears	PFW-1, UP-1, INS-1, CE-1, NYDN-1
Guard	**Russ Letlow**	Green Bay Packers	PFW-1, UP-2, INS-1, CE-1, NYDN-2
Guard	Johnny Dell Isola	New York Giants	PFW-2, INS-2, CE-2, NYDN-2
Guard	Orville Tuttle	New York Giants	PFW-2, UP-2, INS-2
Guard	Byron Gentry	Pittsburgh Pirates	UP-1
Guard	Les Olsson	Washington Redskins	NYDN-1
Guard	John Golemgeske	Brooklyn Dodgers	CE-2
Guard	Ross Carter	Chicago Cardinals	CE-2
Center	**Mel Hein**	New York Giants	PFW-2, UP-1, INS-1, NYDN-1
Center	Frank Bausch	Chicago Bears	PFW-1, UP-2, CE-1, NYDN-2
Center	Mike Basrak	Pittsburgh Pirates	INS-2
Center	Chuck Cherundolo	Cleveland Rams	CE-2
