= 1940 All-Pro Team =

Official list of the best NFL players in 1940

The 1940 All-Pro Team consisted of American football players chosen by various selectors for the All-Pro team of the National Football League (NFL) for the 1940 NFL season. Teams were selected by, among others, the so-called "official" All-Pro team selected by 92 sports writers who were members of the Pro Football Writers Association of American (PFW), the sports writers of the Associated Press (AP), the United Press (UP), the International News Service (INS), Collyer's Eye (CE), the New York Daily News (NYDN), and the Chicago Herald American.

Players displayed in bold were consensus first-team selections. Three players were selected for the first team by all seven selectors: Brooklyn Dodgers quarterback Ace Parker; Brooklyn Dodgers tackle Bruiser Kinard; and Chicago Bears guard Dan Fortmann. Four others were designated for the first team by six selectors: Cleveland Rams fullback Johnny Drake; Green Bay Packers end Don Hutson; Brooklyn Dodgers end Perry Schwartz; and New York Giants center Mel Hein. Another four players were selected by five of seven selectors: Detroit Lions halfback Byron White; Washington Redskins halfback Sammy Baugh; Chicago Bears tackle Joe Stydahar; and New York Giants center Mel Hein.

== Team ==
Position	Player	Team	Selector(s)
Quarterback	**Ace Parker**	Brooklyn Dodgers	PFW-1, AP-1, UP-1, INS-1, CE-1, NYDN-1, CHA-1
Quarterback	**Sammy Baugh**	Washington Redskins	PFW-1, AP-1, UP-1, CE-1, NYDN-1
Quarterback	Sid Luckman	Chicago Bears	CHA-1
Halfback	**Byron White**	Detroit Lions	PFW-1, AP-1, UP-1, INS-1, NYDN-1
Halfback	Cecil Isbell	Green Bay Packers	NFL-2, NYDN-2, UPI-2
Halfback	Dick Todd	Washington Redskins	INS-1
Halfback	Lloyd Cardwell	Detroit Lions	CE-1
Halfback	Fred Vanzo	Detroit Lions	CHA-1
Fullback	**Johnny Drake**	Cleveland Rams	PFW-1, AP-1, UP-1, CE-1, NYDN-1, CHA-1
Fullback	Clarke Hinkle	Green Bay Packers	INS-1
End	**Don Hutson**	Green Bay Packers	PFW-1, AP-1, UP-1, CE-1, NYDN-1, CHA-1
End	**Perry Schwartz**	Brooklyn Dodgers	PFW-1, AP-1, INS-1, CE-1, NYDN-1, CHA-1
End	Jim Poole	New York Giants	UP-1, INS-1
Tackle	**Bruiser Kinard**	Brooklyn Dodgers	PFW-1, AP-1, UP-1, INS-1, CE-1, NYDN-1, CHA-1
Tackle	**Joe Stydahar**	Chicago Bears	PFW-1, AP-1, INS-1, CE-1, NYDN-1
Tackle	Jim Barber	Washington Redskins	UP-1
Tackle	Lee Artoe	Chicago Bears	CHA-1
Guard	**Dan Fortmann**	Chicago Bears	PFW-1, AP-1, UP-1, INS-1, CE-1, NYDN-1, CHA-1
Guard	John Wiethe	Detroit Lions	PFW-1, AP-1, CE-1, NYDN-1
Guard	Steve Slivinski	Washington Redskins	UP-1, INS-1
Guard	Dick Bassi	Philadelphia Eagles	CHA-1
Center	**Mel Hein**	New York Giants	PFW-1, AP-1, UP-1, INS-1, NYDN-1
Center	Charley Brock	Green Bay Packers	CE-1
Center	Bulldog Turner	Chicago Bears	CHA-1
