= Baby Ray =

American football player (1914–1986)

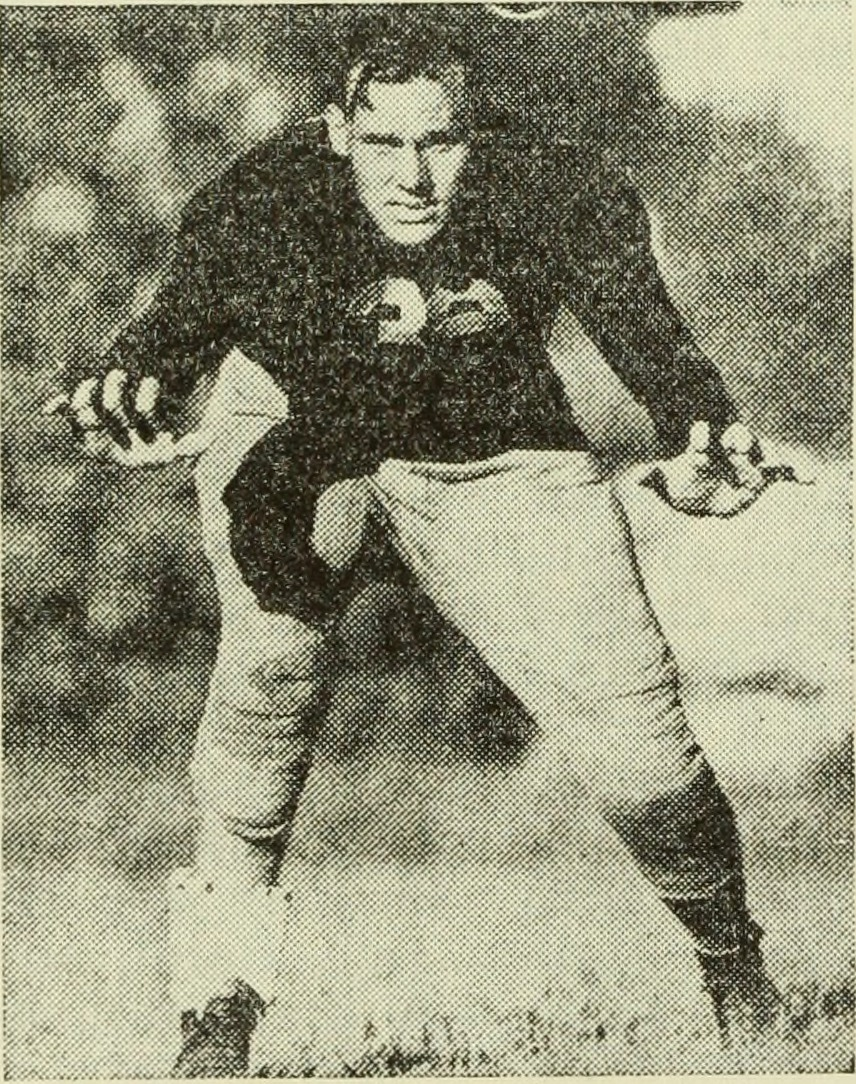
- Ray playing for Vanderbilt

No. 44
- Position: Offensive tackle

Personal information
- Born: September 30, 1914; Una, Tennessee, U.S.
- Died: January 21, 1986 (aged 71); Nashville, Tennessee, U.S.
- Listed height: 6 ft 6 in (1.98 m)
- Listed weight: 249 lb (113 kg)

Career information
- High school: Nashville Central
- College: Vanderbilt (1934-1937)
- NFL draft: 1938: undrafted

Career history
- Green Bay Packers (1938–1948)

Awards and highlights
- 2× NFL champion (1939, 1944); 4× Second-team All-Pro (1939, 1941, 1943, 1944); Pro Bowl (1939); NFL 1940s All-Decade Team; Green Bay Packers Hall of Fame; Second-team All-SEC (1937)

Career NFL statistics
- Games played: 116
- Games started: 66
- Fumble recoveries: 6
- Stats at Pro Football Reference

Buford Garfield "Baby" Ray (September 30, 1914 – January 21, 1986) was an American professional football player who played 11 seasons in the National Football League for the Green Bay Packers from 1938 to 1948.

== Early life ==
Ray was born in Una, Tennessee, an unincorporated town east of Nashville. He attended Central High School in Nashville.

== College career ==
Ray played for Vanderbilt University for three seasons, 1935–1937. He was a stand-out at both offensive and defensive tackle, due in part to his tremendous size. Ray stood 6' 6" and weighed over 280 pounds, much larger than nearly all college football players of the day. In his final season with the Commodores, Ray was named a co-captain.

Ray also competed in the shot put while at Vanderbilt.

== Professional career ==
Ray was not selected in the 1938 NFL draft, and became the subject of a free agent bidding war between George Halas of the Chicago Bears and Curly Lambeau of the Packers. Ray signed with Green Bay, playing the entirety of his 11-year NFL career with the Packers.

Early in his career, Ray shed upwards of 25 pounds from his college playing weight, helping to improve his mobility. Throughout his pro career, Ray typically played at 250-255 pounds.

Ray appeared in the 1940 NFL All-Star Game. He was named to the United Press International All-Pro team four times, once to the First-team (1941) and three times to the Second-team (1939, 1943 and 1944).

Ray was a member of the Packers' 1939 and 1944 NFL championship teams.

== Retirement ==
After retiring as a player, Ray returned to Vanderbilt as an assistant coach under head coach Bill Edwards. He later became the university's first full-time football recruiter and also served as the head of the physical education department. Following his tenure at Vanderbilt, he rejoined the Packers organization as a scout.

In 1969, Ray was named to the National Football League 1940s All-Decade Team by the Pro Football Hall of Fame. He was inducted into the Green Bay Packers Hall of Fame in 1973 and into the Tennessee Sports Hall of Fame in 1983.

Ray died of a heart attack in Nashville on January 21, 1986, at the age of 71 following a hunting trip.

== Personal life ==
Ray had three children with his wife, Jane Burns Ray. They made their home in Nashville.
