= 1939 All-Pro Team =

Official list of the best NFL players in 1939

The 1939 All-Pro Team consisted of American football players chosen by various selectors for the All-Pro team of the National Football League (NFL) for the 1939 NFL season. Teams were selected by, among others, the NFL coaches (NFL), Professional Football Writers Association (PFW), the United Press (UP), the International News Service (INS), Collyer's Eye (CE), and the New York Daily News (NYDN).

Players displayed in bold were consensus first-team selections. Four players were selected for the first team by all six selectors: Chicago Bears fullback Bill Osmanski; Green Bay Packers end Don Hutson; Chicago Bears tackle Joe Stydahar; and Chicago Bears guard Dan Fortmann.

== Team ==
Position	Player	Team	Selector(s)
Quarterback	**Parker Hall**	Cleveland Rams	PFW-1, UP-1, INS-1, NYDN-1
Quarterback	Davey O'Brien	Philadelphia Eagles	NFL-1
Quarterback	Ace Parker	Brooklyn Dodgers	PFW-1, CE-1
Halfback	**Tuffy Leemans**	New York Giants	NFL-1, UP-1, INS-1, NYDN-1
Halfback	**Andy Farkas**	Washington Redskins	NFL-1, PFW-1, UP-1, CE-1, NYDN-1
Halfback	Cecil Isbell	Green Bay Packers	INS-2
Halfback	Frank Filchock	Washington Redskins	INS-1
Halfback	Lloyd Cardwell	Detroit Lions	CE-1
Fullback	**Bill Osmanski**	Chicago Bears	NFL-1, PFW-1, UP-1, INS-1, CE-1, NYDN-1
End	**Don Hutson**	Green Bay Packers	NFL-1, PFW-1, UP-1, INS-1, CE-1, NYDN-1
End	**Jim Poole**	New York Giants	NFL-1, PFW-1, UP-1, INS-1
End	Dick Plasman	Chicago Bears	CE-1
End	Bill Smith	Chicago Cardinals	CE-1
End	Perry Schwartz	Brooklyn Dodgers	NYDN-1
Tackle	**Joe Stydahar**	Chicago Bears	NFL-1, PFW-1, UP-1, INS-1, CE-1, NYDN-1
Tackle	**Jim Barber**	Washington Redskins	NFL-1, PFW-1, UP-1
Tackle	Turk Edwards	Washington Redskins	INS-1, NYDN-1
Tackle	Baby Ray	Green Bay Packers	CE-1
Guard	**Dan Fortmann**	Chicago Bears	NFL-1, PFW-1, UP-1, INS-1, CE-1, NYDN-1
Guard	**Johnny Dell Isola**	New York Giants	NFL-1, PFW-1, CE-1, NYDN-1
Guard	John Wiethe	Detroit Lions	UP-1
Guard	Byron Gentry	Pittsburgh Pirates	UP-1
Center	**Mel Hein**	New York Giants	NFL-1, PFW-1, UP-1, INS-1, NYDN-1
Center	Alex Wojciechowicz	Detroit Lions	CE-1
