= 1943 All-Pro Team =

Official list of the best NFL players in 1943

The 1943 All-Pro Team consisted of American football players who were chosen by various selectors for the All-Pro team for the 1943 football season. Teams were selected by, among others, the Associated Press (AP), the United Press (UP), the International News Service (INS), Pro Football Illustrated, the New York Daily News (NYDN), and the Chicago Herald-American (CHA).

== Selections ==
Position	Player	Team	Selector(s)
Quarterback	Sammy Baugh	Washington Redskins	AP, UP-1, INS, PFI-1, NYDN-1, CHA-1
Quarterback	Sid Luckman	Chicago Bears	AP, UP-1, INS, PFI-1, NYDN-1, CHA-1
Halfback	Tony Canadeo	Green Bay Packers	AP, INS, NYDN-1
Halfback	Harry Clarke	Chicago Bears	AP, UP-1, CHA-1
Halfback	Ward Cuff	New York Giants	UP-1, INS, PFI-1
Halfback	Frank Sinkwich	Detroit Lions	NYDN-1
Fullback	Bill Paschal	New York Giants	PFI-1, CHA-1
End	Don Hutson	Green Bay Packers	AP, UP-1, INS, PFI-1, NYDN-1, CHA-1
End	Eddie Rucinski	Chicago Cardinals	AP, UP-1, CHA-1
End	Bob Masterson	Washington Redskins	INS
End	George Wilson	Chicago Bears	PFI-1
End	Joe Aguirre	Washington Redskins	NYDN-1
Tackle	Al Blozis	New York Giants	UP-1, INS, PFI-1, NYDN-1
Tackle	Vic Sears	Phil-Pitt Steagles	UP-1, INS
Tackle	Baby Ray	Green Bay Packers	PFI-1, NYDN-1
Tackle	Al Blozis	New York Giants	AP
Tackle	Bruiser Kinard	Brooklyn Dodgers	AP
Tackle	Lou Rymkus	Washington Redskins	CHA-1
Tackle	Chet Adams	Green Bay Packers	CHA-1
Tackle	Augie Lio	Detroit Lions	CHA-1
Guard	Dan Fortmann	Chicago Bears	AP, UP-1, PFI-1, NYDN-1, CHA-1
Guard	Dick Farman	Washington Redskins	AP, UP-1, INS, NYDN-1
Guard	Eberle Schultz	Phil-Pitt Steagles	PFI-1
Guard	Len Younce	New York Giants	INS
Center	Bulldog Turner	Chicago Bears	AP, UP-1, INS, PFI-1, NYDN-1, CHA-1
