= Gaynell Tinsley =

American football player and coach (1915–2002)

- Tinsley c. 1955

No. 43, 31, 11
- Position: End

Personal information
- Born: February 1, 1915; Ruple, Louisiana, U.S.
- Died: July 24, 2002 (aged 87); Baton Rouge, Louisiana, U.S.
- Listed height: 6 ft 2 in (1.88 m)
- Listed weight: 210 lb (95 kg)

Career information
- High school: Homer (Homer, Louisiana)
- College: LSU (1934–1936)
- NFL draft: 1937: 2nd round, 12th overall pick

Career history

Playing
- Chicago Cardinals (1937–1938; 1940)

Coaching
- Louisiana College (1937–1938) Head coach; LSU (1947) Assistant coach; LSU (1948–1954) Head coach

Awards and highlights
- 2× First-team All-Pro (1937, 1938); NFL All-Star (1938); NFL receiving yards leader (1937); NFL receptions leader (1938); NFL 1930s All-Decade Team; Unanimous All-American (1936); Consensus All-American (1935); 2× First-team All-SEC (1935, 1936)

Career NFL statistics
- Receptions: 93
- Receiving yards: 1,356
- Receiving touchdowns: 7
- Stats at Pro Football Reference

Head coaching record
- Career: 42–44–7 (.489)
- College Football Hall of Fame

Gaynell Charles "Gus" Tinsley (February 1, 1915 – July 24, 2002) was an American professional football end and coach. He played for the Chicago Cardinals of the National Football League (NFL) from 1937 to 1938 and in 1940. He played college football for the LSU Tigers, where he was a consensus All-American. He was drafted in the second round of the 1937 NFL draft by the Cardinals, with whom he was an All-NFL selection in 1937 and 1938. During his three years in the NFL, Tinsley set or tied NFL single-season records with 674 receiving yards in 1937 and 41 pass receptions in 1938. He later served as the head football coach at LSU from 1948 to 1954. He was inducted into the College Football Hall of Fame in 1956 as a player.

== College career ==
Tinsley was born in Ruple, Louisiana and raised in Homer, Louisiana in the northern part of the state. He attended Louisiana State University where he played football and baseball and was selected as the captain of both teams. He was considered one of the greatest receivers in college football, earning consensus All-American honors in both 1935 and 1936. As a junior in 1935, Tinsley was named a first-team All-American by the Associated Press, United Press, Liberty (selected based on a poll of 1,521 varsity players in all parts of the country), Collier's Weekly, the Newspaper Editors Association, the International News Service, and The New York Sun. At the time, at age 19 he was one of the youngest ever named to the All-America team. In 1936, Tinsley repeated as a first-team All-American with each of these publications and also received the first-team designation from the Central Press Association (selected by the captains of more than 50 college football teams at "important universities and colleges throughout the United States"), and the Walter Camp Football Foundation.

Tinsley while at LSU

Tinsley's profile at the College Football Hall of Fame describes him as such: "Tinsley was a magnificent athletic specimen, standing 6-0, and weighing 196-pounds, size he used equally well as a defensive stalwart who was a blocking master." As a sophomore in 1934, Tinsley had a 65-yard pass reception, thrown by halfback Abe Mickal, against Southern Methodist University, which stood as a record for several years as "the longest pass in Southern football history." Tinsley's coach at LSU, Bernie Moore, once said, "Tinsley could have made All-American at any position. He was so tough, he made blockers quit. He's the greatest lineman I ever saw."

Tinsley concluded his college career by playing in the Chicago College All-Star Game, an annual game between college all-stars and an NFL team. Tinsley scored the only points of the game on a 47-yard touchdown pass from Sammy Baugh, as the college players defeated the Green Bay Packers, 6–0. This was the first victory for the college players against the professionals in the series.

In 1993, LSU selected its all-time team as part of the celebration of the centennial of LSU football. Tinsley was "the only unanimous choice" for LSU's "Early Years Team of the Century." Upon his death in 2002, LSU Sports described his contributions to the school's football teams of the mid-1930s as follows:

Tinsley is widely considered to be among the finest athletes to ever play at LSU. The star end led the Tigers to their first two SEC titles and played in two Sugar Bowls. He earned All-SEC and All-American honors in 1935–36 for his ability to dominate a game on both sides of the ball. In 1936, he was also second in balloting for national MVP honors. ... At 6-3, 215 pounds, Tinsley was considered to the prototype end of his era because of his mobility.

== Professional career ==
Tinsley was drafted by the Chicago Cardinals in the second round as the 12th overall pick in the 1937 NFL draft. He played for the Cardinals for three years: in 1937, 1938 and 1940. As a rookie in 1937, Tinsley set an NFL record with 675 receiving yards. He also ranked among the NFL's 1937 leaders in several categories, including 36 receptions (second in the NFL), 675 receiving yards (first in the NFL), 677 total yards from scrimmage (second in the NFL), five receiving touchdowns (second in the NFL), 18.8 yards per reception (first in the NFL) and 61.4 receiving yards per game (first in the NFL). At the end of the 1937 season, Tinsley was selected as a first-team All-NFL player by the United Press, the NFL, New York Daily News, and Collyers Eye magazine.

Tinsley twice set the record for the longest pass reception in NFL history. He set the mark first in 1937, when he caught a 97-yard pass from Pat Coffee for a touchdown against the Chicago Bears. He broke his own record the following season, against the Cleveland Rams in the Cardinals' final game, with a 98-yard touchdown reception from Doug Russell. Several NFL receivers have since recorded 99-yard receptions, but Tinsley's 98-yarder remains a Cardinals franchise record (although it has been tied twice).

In 1938, Tinsley continued as one of the league's top receivers. He caught passes in nine of the Cardinals' eleven games during the season. His 41 receptions in 1938 tied the all-time NFL single-season record, set by Don Hutson two seasons prior. He also ranked among the 1938 league leaders with 516 receiving yards (second in the NFL) and 46.9 yards per game (fourth in the NFL). He was again selected as a first-team All-NFL player, this time receiving the honor from Pro Football Writers, the NFL, and Collyers Eye magazine.

In March 1939, Tinsley signed a contract to play professional minor league baseball for the Marshall Tigers of the East Texas League. He also left the Cardinals a week into training camp to take up a head coaching position at Haynesville High School in Haynesville, Louisiana, replacing Cecil Crowley.

He returned to the NFL and played in seven games in 1940 before he suffered a torn ligament in his left knee while making a tackle against the Cleveland Rams, which effectively ended his season.

When Tinsley retired, he ranked fourth in NFL history in pass receptions, despite having played only three seasons of professional football. At the time, he was cited along with Don Hutson as being one of "the two greatest pass receivers of all time."

== Coaching career ==
After service in the U.S. Navy, Tinsley worked as a high school football coach in Haynesville, Louisiana. He then served as an assistant football coach at LSU through the 1947 season. In 1948, LSU's long-time football coach, Bernie Moore, retired, and Tinsley was promoted to replace his former mentor. In 1949, Tinsley's team finished the regular season 8–2 and played in the Sugar Bowl against Oklahoma. He became the first person to participate in the Sugar Bowl as both a player and a head coach. Tinsley's LSU teams never met with the same success they had achieved in 1949. In seven years as head coach at LSU, Tinsley's teams compiled a record of 35–34–6. Displeased with the team's performance, the LSU board of supervisors fired Tinsley in February 1955, though they agreed to pay his salary of $12,500 per year for the two remaining years on his contract. After the vote to remove him, Tinsley said, "I have not made any future plans as yet, but I do know that I will continue to help LSU whenever and wherever I can."

== Later life ==
Tinsley was named to the College Football Hall of Fame in 1956. He was elected as one of three charter members to the Louisiana Sports Hall of Fame in 1959. Despite playing only two seasons during the decade, he was voted to the NFL 1930s All-Decade Team. Tinsley died in 2002 at Our Lady of the Lake Regional Medical Center in Baton Rouge, Louisiana, at age 87.

== Head coaching record ==
Year	Team	Overall	Conference	Standing	Bowl/playoffs	AP^{#}
Louisiana College Wildcats (Southern Intercollegiate Athletic Association) (1937–1938)
1937	Louisiana College	3–6	3–4	T–21		
1938	Louisiana College	4–4–1	2–4–1	T–20th		
Louisiana College:		7–10–1	5–8–1			
LSU Tigers (Southeastern Conference) (1948–1954)
1948	LSU	3–7	1–5	T–10th		
1949	LSU	8–3	4–2	5th	L Sugar	9
1950	LSU	4–5–2	2–3–2	9th		
1951	LSU	7–3–1	4–2–1	T–3rd		
1952	LSU	3–7	2–5	10th		
1953	LSU	5–3–3	2–3–3	8th		
1954	LSU	5–6	2–5	9th		
LSU:		35–34–6	17–25–6			
Total:		42–44–7				
^{#}Rankings from final AP poll.
