= Cliff Battles =

American football player and coach (1910–1981)

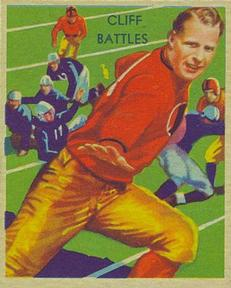

No. 20
- Position: Tailback

Personal information
- Born: May 1, 1910; Akron, Ohio, U.S.
- Died: April 28, 1981 (aged 70); Clearwater, Florida, U.S.
- Listed height: 6 ft 1 in (1.85 m)
- Listed weight: 195 lb (88 kg)

Career information
- High school: Kenmore (Akron)
- College: West Virginia Wesleyan (1928–1931)

Career history

Playing
- Boston Braves / Redskins / Washington Redskins (1932–1937)

Coaching
- Columbia (1938–1943) Assistant coach; El Toro (1944) Assistant coach; Brooklyn Dodgers (1946–1947) Head coach

Awards and highlights
- NFL champion (1937); 3× First-team All-Pro (1933, 1936, 1937); 2× Second-team All-Pro (1932, 1934); 2× NFL rushing yards leader (1932, 1937); NFL rushing touchdowns co-leader (1937); NFL 1930s All-Decade Team; Washington Commanders 90 Greatest; Washington Commanders Ring of Fame

Career statistics
- Rushing yards: 3,511
- Rushing average: 4.2
- Rushing touchdowns: 23
- Receptions: 38
- Receiving yards: 546
- Receiving touchdowns: 4
- Stats at Pro Football Reference

Head coaching record
- Career: 4–16–1 (.214)
- Coaching profile at Pro Football Reference
- Pro Football Hall of Fame
- College Football Hall of Fame

Clifford Franklin Battles (May 1, 1910 – April 28, 1981) was an American professional football tailback who played in the National Football League (NFL). Battles was inducted into the Pro Football Hall of Fame in 1968.

== Early life ==
Battles was born in Akron, Ohio, the son of Frank Battles, a saltworker for the BFGoodrich and Firestone tire companies, and Della Battles. He played high school football at Kenmore High School. Kenmore today honors athletes who carry on Battles' tradition, those who letter in three sports their senior year, with the Cliff Battles Award. Kenmore High School is at the corner of 13th Street and Battles Avenue, but the avenue is not named after Cliff. It was so named before he became famous.

== College career ==
Battles attended and played college football at West Virginia Wesleyan College. His most prominent season was 1931, when he scored 15 touchdowns and had four extra points. The best game of his college career was also in 1931 in a game against Salem College, when he scored seven touchdowns and had 354 rushing yards, 91 kick return yards, and 24 receiving yards, totalling 469.

He acquired the nickname "Gip" (sometimes spelled "Gipp") because of his admiration for Notre Dame back George Gipp, the subject of Knute Rockne's "win one for the Gipper" speech.

While at West Virginia Wesleyan, Battles won 15 letters in five sports – four each in football and track, three each in baseball and basketball, and one in tennis. While there, he was a Phi Beta Kappa scholar and Rhodes Scholarship candidate.

He was named to the West Virginia Hall of Fame in 1950 and the College Football Hall of Fame in 1955.

While at West Virginia Wesleyan, Battles also played semipro football for the South Akron Awnings under the name of Jones.

== Professional career ==
Battles was featured on the cover of the program for the 1936 NFL Championship Game.

After college, Battles got many offers from NFL teams including the New York Giants and Portsmouth Spartans, among other NFL teams. But he signed with the Boston Braves (now the Washington Commanders) in 1932, who offered him $175 per game, compared with a high of $150 from the other teams.

In 1932, Battles won the NFL's rushing title as a rookie. He also performed well during the 1933 season and on October 8, 1933, Battles, playing for the newly named Boston Redskins, became the first player to exceed 200 rushing yards in a game, finishing with 215 yards on 16 rushes and one touchdown against the Giants.

"He was the greatest open-field runner I ever saw.
He didn’t run but seemed to lope along. It was
his natural way of running. Whenever we broke him through
the line, it was almost certain to be a touchdown."

— Teammate Art Bachtel in the Akron-Beacon Journal
on December 13, 1999, on Battles' running style and ability.

In 1937, the Redskins moved from Boston to Washington, D.C., and acquired quarterback Sammy Baugh. For the 1937, Baugh and Battles combined their talents just as everyone had anticipated. During their last regular-season game, Battles scored three touchdowns and the Redskins beat the Giants for the Eastern Division title. In the 1937 NFL Championship against the Chicago Bears a week later, Battles scored the first touchdown in a 28–21 victory that gave the Redskins their first NFL title.

In what would end up being his last regular-season game on December 5, 1937, Battles ran for 165 yards against the Giants at the Polo Grounds. This was the record for most rushing yards for a player in the final regular-season game of his NFL career until Tiki Barber broke the record on December 30, 2006, with 234 rushing yards.

In the 1937 NFL season, Battles was again the league's leading rusher with 874 yards on 216 carries and won all-league honors for the fifth time in six years. In six seasons, Battles totaled 3,511 yards rushing. A two way threat, he also finished his career with 15 interceptions, including one returned for a touchdown.

After 1937, Battles hoped for a raise in salary. George Preston Marshall, the owner of the Redskins, refused to pay him more than $3,000 a year (the amount Battles had been paid since his rookie season). Battles chose retirement instead, and left the game as a player at the end of 1937.

== NFL career statistics ==
Legend
	Won the NFL championship
	Led the league
**Bold**	Career high
Underline	Incomplete data

=== Regular season ===
Year	Team	Games		Rushing					Receiving				Passing									AllTD
Year	Team	GP	GS	Att	Yds	Y/A	Lng	TD	Rec	Yds	Y/R	TD	Cmp	Att	Pct	Yds	Y/A	Lng	TD	Int	Rtg	AllTD
1932	BOS	8	8	148	576	3.9	—	3	4	60	15.0	**1**	2	20	10.0	42	2.1	—	0	2	0.0	4
1933	BOS	**12**	**11**	136	737	**5.4**	—	3	**11**	**185**	16.8	0	5	21	23.8	65	3.1	—	0	3	0.4	4
1934	BOS	**12**	10	96	480	5.0	—	**6**	5	95	**19.0**	**1**	1	9	11.1	7	0.8	**7**	0	0	**39.6**	**7**
1935	BOS	7	6	67	230	3.4	—	1	3	22	7.3	0	5	22	22.7	92	4.2	—	0	1	25.6	2
1936	BOS	11	**11**	176	614	3.5	—	5	6	103	17.2	**1**	**18**	**52**	34.6	**242**	**4.7**	—	**1**	**6**	17.1	**7**
1937	WAS	10	8	**216**	**874**	4.0	**75**	5	9	81	9.0	**1**	13	33	**39.4**	142	4.3	—	0	3	15.0	**7**
Career		60	54	839	3,511	4.2	75	23	38	546	14.4	4	44	157	28.0	590	3.8	7	1	15	5.3	31

=== Postseason ===
Year	Team	Games		Rushing					Receiving					Passing									Fum	AllTD
Year	Team	GP	GS	Att	Yds	Y/A	Lng	TD	Rec	Yds	Y/R	Lng	TD	Cmp	Att	Pct	Yds	Y/A	Lng	TD	Int	Rtg	Fum	AllTD
1936	BOS	1	1	2	8	**4.0**	**13**	0	0	0	—	0	0	0	0	—	0	—	0	0	0	—	—	0
1937	WAS	1	1	**17**	**53**	3.1	9	**1**	**3**	**80**	**26.7**	**42**	0	**3**	**5**	**60.0**	**20**	**4.0**	**13**	0	**1**	**29.2**	**2**	**1**
Career		2	2	19	61	3.2	13	1	3	80	26.7	42	0	3	5	60.0	20	4.0	13	0	1	29.2	2	1

== Coaching career ==
After the 1937 season, Cliff Battles accepted a $4,000 job as an assistant football coach at Columbia University coached there from 1938 to 1943. While at Columbia, Battles was also the head coach of the men's basketball team from 1942 to 1943. He then served in the United States Marine Corps during World War II. After the war, Battles became head coach of the Brooklyn Dodgers of the All-America Football Conference from 1946 to 1947.

== After football ==
After the end of his coaching career, Battles became an associate with General Electric in the Washington Metropolitan Area before retiring in 1979. He died on April 28, 1981, in Clearwater, Florida, and is buried in Parklawn Memorial Park in Rockville, Maryland.
