= Ward Cuff =

American football player (1913–2002)

No. 14, 21
- Positions: Halfback, Placekicker

Personal information
- Born: August 12, 1913; Redwood Falls, Minnesota, U.S.
- Died: December 24, 2002 (aged 89); Vallejo, California, U.S.
- Listed height: 6 ft 1 in (1.85 m)
- Listed weight: 192 lb (87 kg)

Career information
- High school: Redwood Falls
- College: Marquette (1933-1936)
- NFL draft: 1937: 4th round, 34th overall pick

Career history
- New York Giants (1937–1945); Chicago Cardinals (1946); Green Bay Packers (1947)

Awards and highlights
- NFL champion (1938); 5× Second-team All-Pro (1938, 1939, 1941, 1943, 1944); 3× NFL All-Star (1938, 1939, 1941); New York Giants No. 14 retired; 57th greatest New York Giant of all-time

Career NFL statistics
- Rushing yards: 1,851
- Rushing average: 5.4
- Receptions: 106
- Receiving yards: 1,559
- Total touchdowns: 21
- Interceptions: 13
- Field goals: 43/98 (43.9%)
- Stats at Pro Football Reference

Ward Lloyd Cuff (August 12, 1913 – December 24, 2002) was an American professional football player who was a halfback and placekicker in the National Football League (NFL) for the New York Giants, Chicago Cardinals, and Green Bay Packers. He played college football at Marquette University and was drafted in the fourth round of the 1937 NFL draft.

As a fullback at Marquette, Cuff played in the first Cotton Bowl game, in 1937, losing to TCU. He was also Marquette's heavyweight boxing champion and held the school record in the javelin throw. Cuff played for the Giants from 1937 to 1945, won the NFL championship in 1938, and became the team's career scoring leader with 319 points before being traded to the Cardinals. He played one season with the Cardinals and one with the Packers. He led the NFL in field goals made four times. After his NFL career, Cuff coached high school football in Green Bay, was an assistant coach for the Oregon State Beavers football team, and later worked for The Boeing Company.

His number 14 was retired by the Giants, although owner Wellington Mara gave Y. A. Tittle permission to wear it during his time with the Giants from 1961 to 1964. It was retired again in honor of both players.

== NFL career statistics ==
Legend
	Won the NFL Championship
	Led the league
**Bold**	Career high

=== Regular season ===
Year	Team	Games		Rushing				Receiving			
Year	Team	GP	GS	Att	Yds	Avg	TD	Rec	Yds	Avg	TD
1937	NYG	11	9	4	32	**8.0**	2	5	117	**23.4**	**2**
1938	NYG	11	11	18	38	2.1	0	8	114	14.3	1
1939	NYG	9	8	23	102	4.4	0	10	83	8.3	**2**
1940	NYG	8	8	15	86	5.7	1	13	220	16.9	1
1941	NYG	11	10	28	157	5.6	0	**19**	**317**	16.7	**2**
1942	NYG	11	10	38	189	5.0	0	16	267	16.7	**2**
1943	NYG	10	10	**80**	**523**	6.5	**3**	7	52	7.4	0
1944	NYG	10	9	76	425	5.6	0	11	135	12.3	**2**
1945	NYG	9	5	48	214	4.5	0	12	172	14.3	0
1946	CRD	10	7	13	78	6.0	1	5	82	16.4	1
1947	GNB	10	0	1	7	7.0	0	0	0	0.0	0
		110	87	344	1,851	5.4	7	106	1,559	14.7	13

=== Playoffs ===
Year	Team	Games		Rushing				Receiving			
Year	Team	GP	GS	Att	Yds	Avg	TD	Rec	Yds	Avg	TD
1938	NYG	1	1	2	-12	-6.0	0	0	0	0.0	0
1939	NYG	1	1	3	7	2.3	0	1	4	4.0	0
1941	NYG	1	1	3	0	0.0	0	**2**	42	21.0	0
1943	NYG	1	1	9	23	2.6	0	**2**	**46**	**23.0**	0
1944	NYG	1	1	**12**	**55**	**4.6**	**1**	**2**	25	12.5	0
		5	5	29	73	2.5	1	7	117	16.7	0
