= Lloyd Cardwell =

American football player and coach (1913–1997)

No. 3, 10
- Positions: Halfback, End

Personal information
- Born: April 19, 1913; Republic, Kansas, U.S.
- Died: November 10, 1997 (aged 84); Omaha, Nebraska, U.S.
- Listed height: 6 ft 2 in (1.88 m)
- Listed weight: 195 lb (88 kg)

Career information
- High school: Seward (Seward, Nebraska)
- College: Nebraska (1933-1936)
- NFL draft: 1937: 1st round, 7th overall pick

Career history

Playing
- Detroit Lions (1937–1943)

Coaching
- Omaha (1947–1959) Head coach

Awards and highlights
- 2× First-team All-Pro (1939, 1940); Second-team All-Pro (1938); NFL All-Star (1938); 3× First-team All-Big Six (1934, 1935, 1936)

Career NFL statistics
- Rushing yards: 905
- Rushing average: 4.4
- Receptions: 51
- Receiving yards: 932
- Total touchdowns: 13
- Stats at Pro Football Reference

Head coaching record
- Career: 57–53 (.518)

Lloyd Raymond Cardwell (April 19, 1913 – November 10, 1997) was an American professional football player and coach. He played college football for the Nebraska Cornhuskers and professionally in the National Football League (NFL) with the Detroit Lions for seven seasons. He was drafted in the first round of the 1937 NFL Draft with the seventh overall pick. After his playing days, Cardwell was the head football coach at Omaha University—now known as the University of Nebraska Omaha from 1947 to 1959, compiling a record of 57–51. His 1954 team was undefeated and won the Tangerine Bowl. Cardwell also coached track and field at Omaha.

== Head coaching record ==
=== Football ===
| Year | Team | Overall | Conference | Standing | Bowl/playoffs |
|---|---|---|---|---|---|
Omaha Indians (Independent) (1947–1958)
| 1947 | Omaha | 2–5 | | | |
| 1948 | Omaha | 5–4 | | | |
| 1949 | Omaha | 3–5 | | | |
| 1950 | Omaha | 6–3 | | | |
| 1951 | Omaha | 4–5 | | | |
| 1952 | Omaha | 5–4 | | | |
| 1953 | Omaha | 6–2 | | | |
| 1954 | Omaha | 10–0 | | | W Tangerine |
| 1955 | Omaha | 8–1 | | | |
| 1956 | Omaha | 6–2 | | | |
| 1957 | Omaha | 1–7 | | | |
| 1958 | Omaha | 0–8 | | | |
Omaha Indians (Central Intercollegiate Conference) (1959)
| 1959 | Omaha | 1–7 | 1–4 | T–5th | |
| Omaha: | | 57–53 | 1–4 | | |
| Total: | | 57–53 | | | |
