= Perry Schwartz =

American football player (1915–2001)

- Schwartz at Cal in 1935

No. 99, 57
- Position: End

Personal information
- Born: April 27, 1915; Chicago, Illinois, U.S.
- Died: January 4, 2001 (aged 85); Cloverdale, California, U.S.
- Listed height: 6 ft 2 in (1.88 m)
- Listed weight: 199 lb (90 kg)

Career information
- High school: Tamalpais (Mill Valley, California)
- College: Sacramento CC (1933); California (1935-1937)
- NFL draft: 1938: 6th round, 43rd overall pick

Career history
- Brooklyn Dodgers (1938–1942); New York Yankees (1946)

Awards and highlights
- 2× First-team All-Pro (1940, 1941); Second-team All-Pro (1939); 4× NFL All-Star team (1938, 1939, 1941, 1942); First-team All-American (1937); First-team All-PCC (1937)

Career NFL/AAFC statistics
- Receptions: 105
- Receiving yards: 1,696
- Touchdowns: 10
- Stats at Pro Football Reference

Perry Schwartz (April 27, 1915 – January 4, 2001) was an American professional football player who was an end for five seasons with the National Football League (NFL)'s Brooklyn Dodgers (1938–1942) and the All-America Football Conference (AAFC)'s New York Yankees (1946). He played college football for the California Golden Bears and was selected in the sixth round of the 1938 NFL draft.

== NFL/AAFC career statistics ==
Legend
	Led the league
**Bold**	Career high

=== Regular season ===
Year	Team	Games		Receiving				
Year	Team	GP	GS	Rec	Yds	Avg	Lng	TD
1938	BKN	10	9	8	132	16.5	-	1
1939	BKN	11	11	**33**	**550**	16.7	66	**3**
1940	BKN	11	11	21	370	**17.6**	-	**3**
1941	BKN	11	11	25	362	14.5	36	2
1942	BKN	11	10	13	200	15.4	**71**	1
1946	NYY	14	1	5	82	16.4	-	0
		68	53	105	1,696	16.2	71	10

=== Playoffs ===
Year	Team	Games		Receiving				
Year	Team	GP	GS	Rec	Yds	Avg	Lng	TD
1946	NYY	1	0	1	12	12.0	12	0
		1	0	1	12	12.0	12	0

Schwarz in 1941 as a member of the Brooklyn Dodgers of the NFL.
