= 1933 All-Pro Team =

Official list of the best NFL players in 1933

The 1933 All-Pro Team consisted of American football players chosen by various selectors for the All-Pro team of the National Football League (NFL) for the 1933 NFL season. Teams were selected by, among others, the NFL coaches (NFL), the United Press, Red Grange for Collyer's Eye (CE), and the Green Bay Press-Gazette (GB).

== Team ==
Position	Player	Team	Selector(s)
Quarterback	Glenn Presnell	Portsmouth Spartans	NFL-1 [halfback], UP-1, CE, GB-1
Quarterback	Harry Newman	New York Giants	NFL-1, UP-2, GB-2
Quarterback	Benny Friedman	Brooklyn Dodgers	NFL-2
Halfback	Cliff Battles	Boston Redskins	NFL-1, UP-1, CE, GB-1
Halfback	Ken Strong	New York Giants	NFL-2, UP-1, CE, GB-1
Halfback	Shipwreck Kelly	Brooklyn Dodgers	UP-2
Halfback	Clarke Hinkle	Green Bay Packers	UP-2, GB-2
Halfback	Swede Hanson	Philadelphia Eagles	NFL-2, GB-2
Fullback	Bronko Nagurski	Chicago Bears	NFL-1, UP-1, CE, GB-1
Fullback	Jim Musick	Boston Redskins	NFL-2, UP-2, GB-2
End	Bill Hewitt	Chicago Bears	NFL-1, UP-1, CE, GB-1
End	Red Badgro	New York Giants	NFL-1, GB-1
End	Harry Ebding	Portsmouth Spartans	NFL-2, UP-1, GB-2
End	Ray Flaherty	New York Giants	NFL-2, UP-2, CE, GB-2
End	LaVern Dilweg	Green Bay Packers	UP-2
Tackle	Cal Hubbard	Green Bay Packers	NFL-1, UP-1, CE, GB-1 [guard]
Tackle	George Christensen	Portsmouth Spartans	UP-1, CE
Tackle	Lou Gordon	Chicago Cardinals	UP-2, GB-2
Tackle	Turk Edwards	Boston Redskins	NFL-1, UP-2
Tackle	Len Grant	New York Giants	NFL-2, GB-2
Tackle	George Musso	Chicago Bears	NFL-2
Guard	Joe Kopcha	Chicago Bears	NFL-1, UP-1, CE, GB-2
Guard	Ox Emerson	Portsmouth Spartans	UP-1, CE
Guard	Herman Hickman	Brooklyn Dodgers	NFL-1, UP-2, GB-1
Guard	Zuck Carlson	Chicago Bears	NFL-2, UP-2, GB-2
Guard	Butch Gibson	New York Giants	NFL-2
Center	Ookie Miller	Chicago Bears	NFL-2, UP-1, CE, GB-1
Center	Mel Hein	New York Giants	NFL-1, UP-2, GB-2
