= 1941 All-Pro Team =

Official list of the best NFL players in 1941

The 1941 All-Pro Team consisted of American football players chosen by various selectors for the All-Pro team of the National Football League (NFL) for the 1941 NFL season. Teams were selected by, among others, the so-called "official" All-Pro team selected by a committee of professional football writers for the NFL (NFL), the sports writers of the Associated Press (AP), the United Press (UP), Collyer's Eye (CE), the New York Daily News (NYDN), and the Chicago Herald American.

Players displayed in bold were consensus first-team selections. Five players were named to the first team by all six selectors: Green Bay Packers halfback Cecil Isbell; Chicago Bears halfback George McAfee; Green Bay Packers end Don Hutson; Chicago Bears guard Dan Fortmann; and Chicago Bears center Bulldog Turner.

Position	Player	Team	Selector(s)
Quarterback	**Sid Luckman**	Chicago Bears	NFL-1, AP-1, NYDN-1, CHA-1
Quarterback	**Cecil Isbell**	Green Bay Packers	NFL-1, AP-1, UP-1, CE-1, NYDN-1, CHA-1
Halfback	**George McAfee**	Chicago Bears	NFL-1, AP-1, UP-1, CE-1, NYDN-1, CHA-1
Halfback	Ward Cuff	New York Giants	UP-1
Fullback	**Pug Manders**	Brooklyn Dodgers	AP-1, UP-1, CE-1, NYDN-1
Fullback	Clarke Hinkle	Green Bay Packers	NFL-1
Fullback	Bill Osmanski	Chicago Bears	CE-1
Fullback	Norm Standlee	Chicago Bears	CHA-1
End	**Don Hutson**	Green Bay Packers	NFL-1, AP-1, UP-1, CE-1, NYDN-1, CHA-1
End	**Perry Schwartz**	Brooklyn Dodgers	NFL-1, AP-1, CE-1, NYDN-1
End	Dick Plasman	Chicago Bears	UP-1
End	Jim Lee Howell	New York Giants	CHA-1
Tackle	**Bruiser Kinard**	Brooklyn Dodgers	NFL-1, UP-1, NYDN-1, CHA-1
Tackle	**Willie Wilkin**	Washington Redskins	NFL-1, AP-1, NYDN-1, CHA-1
Tackle	John Mellus	New York Giants	AP-1, CE-1
Tackle	Baby Ray	Green Bay Packers	UP-1, CE-1
Guard	**Dan Fortmann**	Chicago Bears	NFL-1, AP-1, UP-1, CE-1, NYDN-1, CHA-1
Guard	**Joe Kuharich**	Chicago Cardinals	NFL-1, AP-1, CE-1, CHA-1
Guard	Riley Matheson	Cleveland Rams	UP-1
Guard	Bob Suffridge	Philadelphia Eagles	NYDN-1
Center	**Bulldog Turner**	Chicago Bears	NFL-1, AP-1, UP-1, CE-1, NYDN-1, CHA-1
