= Red Badgro =

American football player and coach (1902–1998)

- Born: December 1, 1902; Orillia, Washington, U.S.
- Died: July 13, 1998 (aged 95); Kent, Washington, U.S.
- Football career

No. 29, 17, 32
- Position: End

Personal information
- Listed height: 6 ft 0 in (1.83 m)
- Listed weight: 191 lb (87 kg)

Career information
- High school: Kent (Kent, Washington)
- College: USC (1923–1926)

Career history

Playing
- New York Yankees (1927–1928); New York Giants (1930–1935); Brooklyn Dodgers (1936)

Coaching
- USC (1937) Assistant coach; Ventura (1938) Head coach; Columbia (1939–1942) Ends coach; Washington (1946–1953) Ends coach

Awards and highlights
- NFL champion (1934); 3× First-team All-Pro (1931, 1933, 1934); NFL receptions co-leader (1934); 70th greatest New York Giant of all-time; First-team All-PCC (1926)

Career statistics
- Receptions: 35
- Receiving yards: 560
- Receiving touchdowns: 7
- Stats at Pro Football Reference
- Pro Football Hall of Fame
- Baseball career
- Outfielder
- Batted: Left Threw: Right

MLB debut
- June 20, 1929, for the St. Louis Browns

Last MLB appearance
- September 18, 1930, for the St. Louis Browns

MLB statistics
- Batting average: .257
- Home runs: 2
- RBI: 45
- Stats at Baseball Reference

Teams
- St. Louis Browns (1929–1930)

Morris Hiram "Red" Badgro (December 1, 1902 – July 13, 1998) was an American professional football and baseball player. He played as an end in the National Football League (NFL). He was inducted into the Pro Football Hall of Fame in 1981.

A native of Orillia, Washington, he attended the University of Southern California (USC) where he played baseball, basketball, and football. He then played nine seasons of professional football for the New York Yankees (1927–1928), New York Giants (1930–1935), and Brooklyn Dodgers (1936). He was selected as a first-team All-Pro in 1931, 1933, and 1934. He scored the first touchdown in the first NFL Championship Game and was a member of the 1934 New York Giants team that won the second NFL Championship Game.

Badgro also played professional baseball as an outfielder for six years from 1928 to 1933, including two seasons in Major League Baseball for the St. Louis Browns (1929–1930). After his career as an athlete was over, Badgro served as a football coach for 14 years, including stints as the ends coach for Columbia (1939–1942) and Washington (1946–1953).

== Early life ==
Badgro was born in 1902 in Orillia, Washington. His father, Walter Badgro (1865–1940), was a farmer in Orillia. He attended Kent High School where he was twice named captain of the basketball and baseball teams. Badgro later recalled that his focus was on baseball and basketball in high school, noting that he only played "maybe three games of football in four years" of high school.

== University of Southern California ==
Badgro enrolled at the University of Southern California (USC) on a basketball scholarship. At USC, was a multi-sport star in baseball, basketball, and football. Playing at the end position for the USC football team, he was selected by the United Press as a first-team player on the 1926 All-Pacific Coast football team. He was a forward for the USC basketball team and was named to the All-Pacific Coast Conference basketball team in 1927. During the 1927 baseball season, he led USC with a .352 batting average, scored 25 runs in 21 games, and was named to the All-California baseball team.

== Professional athlete ==
=== Football ===
Badgro played 10 seasons of professional football. During the 1927 season, he appeared in 12 games for the New York Yankees. The Yankees folded after the 1928 season, and Badgro opted to focus on professional baseball. He did not play professional football in 1929.

After playing Major League Baseball in 1929 and 1930, Badgro qualified as a free agent in professional football and signed with the New York Giants for $150 a game. He gained his greatest acclaim as the starting left end for the Giants from 1930 to 1935. He was regarded as a sure-tackling defender and an effective blocker and talented receiver on offense. Giants coach Steve Owen said of Badgro: "He could block, tackle, and catch passes equally well. And he could do each with the best of them." Highlights from Badgro's prime years include the following:

- In 1930, he appeared in 17 games at left end, 14 as a starter, and was selected by the Green Bay Press-Gazette as a second-team end on the 1930 All-Pro Team.
- In 1931, he appeared in 13 games, 11 as a starter, and was selected by the NFL as a first-team end on the official 1931 All-Pro Team.
- In 1932, he appeared in 12 games, 11 as a starter.
- In 1933, he appeared in 12 games, 10 as a starter, and was selected by the Chicago Daily News as a second-team end on the 1933 All-Pro Team. He helped lead the Giants to the 1933 NFL Championship Game where he scored the first touchdown in the first NFL Championship Game, a 29-yard touchdown on a pass from Harry Newman.
- In 1934, he appeared in 13 games, all as a starter, for the Giants team that won the 1934 NFL Championship Game. He was selected by the NFL and the Chicago Daily News as a first-team end on the 1934 All-Pro Team. He also led the NFL with 16 receptions.
- Playing against the Boston Redskins in 1935, Badgro blocked a punt, and teammate Les Corzine returned it for a go-ahead touchdown.

Badgro concluded his playing career with the Brooklyn Dodgers in 1936.

=== Baseball ===
Badgro also played professional baseball. He played minor league ball in 1928 for the Tulsa Oilers in the Western League and the Muskogee Chiefs in the Western Association, compiling a .351 batting average in 513 at bats. He also played for the Milwaukee Brewers of the American Association in 1929.

In June 1929, Badgro made his major league debut with the St. Louis Browns. Over the 1929 and 1930 season, he appeared in 143 games, 80 of them as a right fielder and 13 as a center fielder. He compiled a .257 batting average in 382 major league at-bats and appeared in his final major league game on September 18, 1930.

Badgro continued to play in the minor leagues for several years, including stints with the Wichita Falls Spudders of the Texas League (1931–1932) and Seattle Indians of the Pacific Coast League (1933).

== NFL career statistics ==
Legend
	Won the NFL championship
	Led the league
**Bold**	Career high
Underline	Incomplete data

=== Regular season ===
Year	Team	Games		Receiving				
Year	Team	GP	GS	Rec	Yds	Y/R	Lng	TD
1927	NYY	12	5	—	—	—	—	1
1928	NYY	1	0	—	—	—	—	0
1930	NYG	**17**	**14**	—	—	—	—	**3**
1931	NYG	13	11	—	—	—	—	0
1932	NYG	12	11	6	106	17.7	—	0
1933	NYG	12	10	9	176	19.6	—	2
1934	NYG	13	13	**16**	**206**	12.9	—	1
1935	NYG	5	5	1	13	13.0	**13**	0
1936	BKN	9	7	3	59	**19.7**	—	0
Career		94	76	35	560	16.0	13	7

=== Postseason ===
Year	Team	Games		Receiving				
Year	Team	GP	GS	Rec	Yds	Y/R	Lng	TD
1933	NYG	**1**	**1**	**2**	**38**	**19.0**	**29**	**1**
1934	NYG	—	—	—	—	—	—	—
Career		1	1	2	38	19.0	29	1

== Coaching career ==
In 1937, Badgro returned to USC to finish the credits he needed to graduate. At the same time, he was a member of Howard Jones' football coaching staff at USC, responsible for working with USC's frosh players.

In June 1938, Badgro was hired as the football coach at Ventura High School in Ventura, California. He also coached football, baseball, and basketball for Ventura Junior College.

In June 1939, he was hired as an assistant coach (responsible for ends) under Lou Little at Columbia. He remained at Columbia through the 1942 season.

In 1944, Badgro was employed in a Seattle war plant.

In February 1946, Badgro was hired as an assistant football coach at the University of Washington. When Howard Odell took over as Washington's head coach, he retained Badgro as his ends coach. Badgro was again retained when John Cherberg took over as head coach in 1953. He resigned his coaching post at Washington in January 1954 in order to pursue private business in Kent, Washington.

== Family, later years, and honors ==
Badgro was married to Dorothea Taylor. After retiring from football, Badgro worked for the Department of Agriculture in the State of Washington.

In 1967, Badgro was inducted into the Washington State Sports Hall of Fame. Badgro was inducted into the Pro Football Hall of Fame in 1981 at age 78. At that time, he was the oldest person to be inducted into the Hall of Fame. Badgro's Hall of Fame Induction Party was held on August 15th, 1981, at 5 PM in Lake Oswego, Oregon.

Badgro died in July 1998 at age 95 in Kent, Washington. He had been hospitalized after a fall.

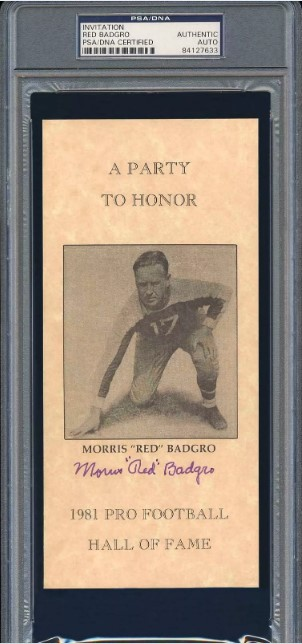
Invitation to Red Badgro's Hall of Fame induction party.
