= Bill Hewitt (American football) =

American football player (1909–1947)

No. 54, 56, 82
- Position: End

Personal information
- Born: October 8, 1909; Bay City, Michigan, U.S.
- Died: January 14, 1947 (aged 37); Sellersville, Pennsylvania, U.S.
- Listed height: 5 ft 9 in (1.75 m)
- Listed weight: 190 lb (86 kg)

Career information
- High school: Central (Bay City, Michigan)
- College: Michigan (1929–1931)

Career history
- Chicago Bears (1932–1936); Philadelphia Eagles (1937–1939); Steagles (1943)

Awards and highlights
- 2× NFL champion (1932, 1933); 4× First-team All-Pro (1933–1934, 1936, 1938); 2× Second-team All-Pro (1932, 1937); NFL receiving touchdowns leader (1934); NFL 75th Anniversary All-Time Team; NFL 100th Anniversary All-Time Team; NFL 1930s All-Decade Team; Chicago Bears No. 56 retired; 100 greatest Bears of All-Time; Philadelphia Eagles Hall of Fame; Third-team All-American (1931); Second-team All-Big Ten (1931)

Career statistics
- Games played: 101
- Starts: 89
- Receptions: 103
- Receiving yards: 1,638
- Receiving touchdowns: 24
- Stats at Pro Football Reference
- Pro Football Hall of Fame

William Ernest Hewitt (October 8, 1909 – January 14, 1947) was an American professional football player who was an end in the National Football League (NFL). He played five seasons for the Chicago Bears (1932–1936), three for the Philadelphia Eagles (1937–1939), and one for the Phil-Pitt Steagles (1943). He is remembered for his refusal to wear a helmet as one of the last NFL players not to wear one.

Hewitt played college football for the Michigan Wolverines, where he was named team's most valuable player and second-team All-Big Ten his senior season. In nine NFL seasons, he was named an All-Pro six times, won two NFL championships, and in 1934 led the league in touchdown receptions. His jersey number 56 is retired by the Bears and he is a member of the Philadelphia Eagles Hall of Fame. Hewitt was posthumously inducted into the Pro Football Hall of Fame in 1971.

== Early life and college ==
Hewitt was born in Bay City, Michigan, and attended Bay City Central High School. He attended the University of Michigan, where he lettered for three seasons for the Michigan Wolverines football team. He started in two games each in 1929 and 1930, and in 1931 was a first-team All-Big Ten selection from the United Press, as well as the Wolverines' team MVP. That season, he started four games at left end and five games at fullback, and had 446 yards rushing on 118 attempts. Against Minnesota, he scored the only touchdown of the game on a 57-yard run to help Michigan secure that year's Little Brown Jug trophy with a 6–0 win.

== Professional career ==
His head coach in Chicago, George Halas, called Hewitt "absolutely fearless. He was a happy-go-lucky guy—until he stepped onto the field—and then he was a terror on offense or defense. He asked no quarter nor gave any." For most of his career, Hewitt refused to wear a helmet during games, reasoning that wearing one inhibited his play. He played without one until 1939, his final season with the Eagles, due to new league rules requiring players to wear a helmet. On defense, Hewitt was known for his quick reaction to the snap, which led fans to refer to him as "The Offside Kid." "I just anticipate when the ball is going to be snapped and charge at the same time", explained Hewitt. "Anyway, what is the head linesman for? It's up to him to call offside if he thinks I am."

=== Chicago Bears ===
Hewitt played for the Chicago Bears for five seasons, from 1932 to 1936. As a rookie, he played in the 1932 NFL Playoff Game for the Bears against the Portsmouth Spartans, which was held to break a tie that season for the NFL championship. The Bears defeated the Spartans 9–0.

Bill Hewitt, playing without a helmet, laterals to teammate Bill Karr as two New York Giants defenders close in, 1933.

The next season the Bears played in the first ever NFL Championship Game, against the New York Giants, a game started by Hewitt at left end. Hewitt had only one reception for three yards in the game, but was a part of what was described as "the greatest play of the game." In the fourth quarter, with the Bears trailing by five, Hewitt received a pass from Bears quarterback Keith Molesworth, before lateraling to end Bill Karr, who then ran 19 yards for the final touchdown of the game. The Bears won the game 23–21.

Hewitt led the league in receiving touchdowns in 1934, with five, and was named a first-team All-Pro selection for the third time in as many years. In 1935 Hewitt caught five passes and was without a touchdown for the first time in his career. He had his most productive season as a pro in both receiving yards and touchdowns in 1936, as he caught 15 passes for 358 yards and six touchdowns.

=== Philadelphia Eagles ===
After considering retirement, Hewitt was traded to the Philadelphia Eagles with $4,000 in cash from the Bears in exchange for the rights to the first overall selection in the 1937 NFL draft, Sam Francis, on February 15, 1937. Hewitt's game salary increased from $100 per game to $200 per game following the trade. He played for the Eagles for three seasons from 1937 to 1939. He was named to the All-NFL team in 1937, becoming the first player in league history to be named an All-Pro for two different teams. He had his second All-NFL selection as an Eagle in 1938 after catching a career-high 18 passes on the season. In November 1939, Eagles president Bert Bell announced Hewitt would be retiring at the end of the season after eight years in the NFL. In his final home game with the Eagles, against the Pittsburgh Pirates, he was the middle man of a 66-yard play as he received a 26-yard pass from Davey O'Brien and lateraled to Jay Arnold, who ran 40 yards for the touchdown. They won 17–14—their first and only win that season.

=== Steagles and retirement ===
After being out of football for three seasons, Hewitt returned in 1943 to play fullback for the Steagles, a temporary merger of the Eagles and Pittsburgh Steelers during World War II. He appeared in six games that season, started in four of them, and caught two passes for 22 yards, after which he retired for good. During his career he caught 103 passes for 1,638 yards and 23 touchdowns. He also had one rushing touchdown and three passing touchdowns. He was named an All-Pro by at least one major U.S. publication six times in his career.

== After football ==
After retiring from professional football in 1943, Hewitt worked for Supplee-Wills-Jones, a milk company, until September 1946. He died in a car crash on January 14, 1947, in Sellersville, Pennsylvania and was interred at Holy Sepulchre Cemetery in Cheltenham Township, Pennsylvania.

Hewitt was inducted into the Pro Football Hall of Fame in 1971. With his induction, the Bears became the first NFL team to have a complete one-platoon lineup in the Hall of Fame. In 2008 Hewitt was named to the University of Michigan Athletic Hall of Honor. He is a member of the National Football League 1930s All-Decade Team, selected in 1969 by the Hall of Fame. Hewitt's jersey number 56 is retired by the Bears, and he is enshrined in the Philadelphia Eagles Hall of Fame.

== Sources ==
- Lyons, Robert S. (2010). On Any Given Sunday, A Life of Bert Bell. Philadelphia: Temple University Press. ISBN 978-1-59213-731-2
