= NFL 1930s All-Decade Team =

Official list of the NFL's best players in the 1930s

This is a list of all NFL players who had outstanding performances throughout the 1930s and have been compiled together into this fantasy group. The team was selected by voters of the Pro Football Hall of Fame retroactively in 1969 to mark the league's 50th anniversary.

All information can be Referenced at the Hall of Fame website
Position	Player	Team(s)	Years	Hall of Fame Class
Quarterback	Earl “Dutch” Clark	Portsmouth Spartans/Detroit Lions	1931–32, 1934–38	1963
Quarterback	Arnie Herber	Green Bay Packers	1930–40	1966
Quarterback	Arnie Herber	New York Giants	1944–45	1966
Quarterback	Cecil Isbell	Green Bay Packers	1938–42	Not Inducted
Halfback	Cliff Battles	Boston Braves/Boston Redskins/Washington Redskins	1932–37	1968
Halfback	Johnny Blood	Milwaukee Badgers	1925–26	1963
Halfback	Johnny Blood	Duluth Eskimos	1926–27	1963
Halfback	Johnny Blood	Pottsville Maroons	1928	1963
Halfback	Johnny Blood	Green Bay Packers	1929–33, 1935–36	1963
Halfback	Johnny Blood	Pittsburgh Pirates	1934, 1937–38	1963
Halfback	Beattie Feathers	Chicago Bears	1934–37	Not Inducted
Halfback	Beattie Feathers	Brooklyn Dodgers	1938–39	Not Inducted
Halfback	Beattie Feathers	Green Bay Packers	1940	Not Inducted
Halfback	Alphonse “Tuffy” Leemans	New York Giants	1936–43	1978
Halfback	Ken Strong	Staten Island Stapletons	1929–32	1967
Halfback	Ken Strong	New York Giants	1933–1935, 1939, 1944–47	1967
Halfback	Ken Strong	New York Yanks (AFL)	1936–37	1967
Fullback	Clarke Hinkle	Green Bay Packers	1932–41	1964
Fullback	Bronko Nagurski	Chicago Bears	1930–37, 1943	1963
End	Bill Hewitt	Chicago Bears	1926–36	1971
End	Bill Hewitt	Philadelphia Eagles	1938–39	1971
End	Bill Hewitt	Phil-Pitt Steagles	1943	1971
End	Don Hutson	Green Bay Packers	1935–45	1963
End	Wayne Millner	Boston/Washington Redskins	1936–41, 1945	1968
End	Gaynell Tinsley	Chicago Cardinals	1937–38, 1940	Not Inducted
Tackle	George Christensen	Portsmouth Spartans/Detroit Lions	1931–38	Not Inducted
Tackle	Frank Cope	New York Giants	1938–47	Not Inducted
Tackle	Glen “Turk” Edwards	Boston Braves/Boston Redskins/Washington Redskins	1932–40	1969
Tackle	Bill Lee	Brooklyn Dodgers	1935–37	Not Inducted
Tackle	Bill Lee	Green Bay Packers	1937–42, 1946	Not Inducted
Tackle	Joe Stydahar	Chicago Bears	1936–42, 1945–46	1967
Guard	Grover “Ox” Emerson	Portsmouth Spartans/Detroit Lions	1931–37	Not Inducted
Guard	Grover “Ox” Emerson	Brooklyn Dodgers	1938	Not Inducted
Guard	Dan Fortmann	Chicago Bears	1936–43	1965
Guard	Charles “Buckets” Goldenberg	Green Bay Packers	1933–45	Not Inducted
Guard	Russ Letlow	Green Bay Packers	1936–42, 1946	Not Inducted
Center	Mel Hein	New York Giants	1931–45	1963
Center	George Svendsen	Green Bay Packers	1935–37, 1940–41	Not Inducted

== See also ==
- History of the National Football League
