= Orillia, Washington =

Former community in Washington (state)

Orillia
- Unincorporated community
- Location within Washington (state) Location within the United States
- Coordinates: 47°26′28″N 122°14′44″W
- Country: United States
- State: Washington
- County: King
- Established: 1887
- Annexed into Kent and Renton: 1959
- Time zone: UTC-8 (Pacific (PST))
  - Summer (DST): UTC-7 (PDT)

Orillia is a former community, southwest of Renton in the Green River Valley of King County in the U.S. state of Washington. At one time, it had a schoolhouse. Today, it lies on the border between the cities of Kent, Tukwila and Renton.

A post office called Orillia was established in 1887, and remained in operation until 1964. The community was named after Orillia, Ontario, Canada, the native home of an early settler. In 1959, the cities of Kent and Renton annexed the community.

Red Badgro was born in Orillia.
