= Charles Goldenberg =

American football player (1911–1986)

No. 21, 51, 44, 43
- Positions: Offensive guard, running back

Personal information
- Born: April 15, 1911; Odessa, Russian Empire
- Died: April 16, 1986 (aged 75); Glendale, Wisconsin, U.S.
- Listed height: 5 ft 10 in (1.78 m)
- Listed weight: 220 lb (100 kg)

Career information
- High school: Milwaukee (WI) West Division
- College: Wisconsin

Career history
- Green Bay Packers (1933–1945)

Awards and highlights
- 3× NFL champion (1936, 1939, 1944); NFL 1930s All-Decade Team; Green Bay Packers Hall of Fame

Career statistics
- Games played: 120
- Touchdowns: 6
- Stats at Pro Football Reference

Charles R. "Buckets" Goldenberg (April 15, 1911 – April 16, 1986) was an All-Pro National Football League (NFL) American football player. He is often credited as the originator of the draw play by forcing Sid Luckman to hand off with his blitzing.

== Biography ==
Goldenberg was born in Odessa, Russian Empire, and was Jewish. He and his family immigrated to Wisconsin when he was four. His nickname, a play on "buttocks", was "Buckets". He grew up in Milwaukee, Wisconsin, and attended and played football for West Division High School in Milwaukee, where he was an All-City halfback. He played college football for the University of Wisconsin Badgers football team.

In 1933 as a rookie he led the NFL in touchdowns, with seven. In 1939 he was 1st Team All-Pro (Chicago Herald Am.), and in 1942 he was 2nd Team, All-Pro (Associated Press and NFL).

Goldenberg played in 120 NFL games while starting in 69 of them. He had 108 carries for 365 yards and six touchdowns, along with 11 receptions for 111 yards and one touchdown. Most of his carries were in his first three seasons (98 of his 108). He had eight career interceptions, with 73 return yards and two touchdowns.

He wrestled as a professional in the off-season. He defeated Joe Wolfe in 1933 on the first wrestling card on record in Green Bay. He's also on record for a card in 1936 at the Columbus Club in Green Bay, which became the studios for WBAY-TY.

Later in his career, he opened up restaurants.

Goldenberg is one of ten players who were named to the National Football League 1930s All-Decade Team who have not been inducted into the Pro Football Hall of Fame. He was named "Outstanding Jewish Athlete of All Time" by the Green Bay B'nai B'rith Lodge in 1969, inducted into the Green Bay Packers Hall of Fame in 1972, and elected to the Wisconsin Athletic Hall of Fame in 1973.

== See also ==
- List of select Jewish football players
