= Tuffy Leemans =

American football player (1912–1979)

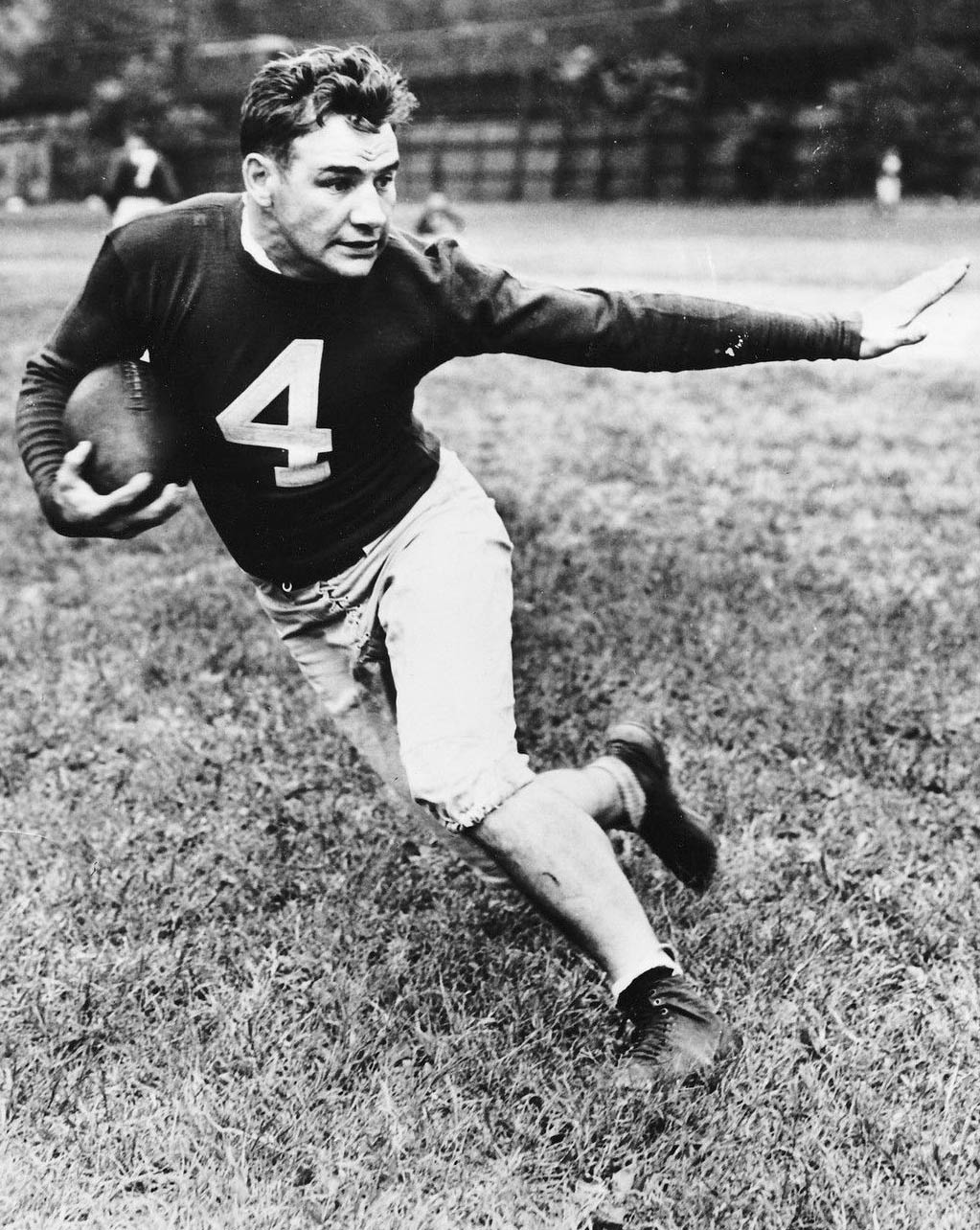
- Leemans in 1939

No. 4
- Positions: Fullback, halfback

Personal information
- Born: November 12, 1912; Superior, Wisconsin, U.S.
- Died: January 19, 1979 (aged 66); Hillsboro Beach, Florida, U.S.
- Listed height: 6 ft 0 in (1.83 m)
- Listed weight: 195 lb (88 kg)

Career information
- High school: East (Superior)
- College: Oregon (1932); George Washington (1933-1935)
- NFL draft: 1936: 2nd round, 18th overall pick

Career history

Playing
- New York Giants (1936–1943)

Coaching
- New York Giants (1943–1944) Backfield coach; George Washington (1946) Backfield coach

Awards and highlights
- NFL champion (1938); 2× First-team All-Pro (1936, 1939); 2× Second-team All-Pro (1937, 1938); 2× NFL All-Star Game (1938, 1941); NFL rushing yards leader (1936); NFL 1930s All-Decade Team; New York Giants Ring of Honor; New York Giants No. 4 retired; 15th greatest New York Giant of all-time

Career NFL statistics
- Rushing yards: 3,130
- Rushing average: 3.4
- Rushing touchdowns: 17
- TD–INT: 25–32
- Passing yards: 2,318
- Defensive interceptions: 4
- Stats at Pro Football Reference
- Pro Football Hall of Fame

Alphonse Emil "Tuffy" Leemans (November 12, 1912 – January 19, 1979) was an American professional football player who was a fullback and halfback who played on both offense and defense for the New York Giants of the National Football League (NFL).

A native of Superior, Wisconsin, Leemans played college football for the Oregon Ducks and the George Washington Colonials. He was drafted by the Giants in the second round of the 1936 NFL draft and played eight years for the Giants from 1936 to 1943. He led the NFL as a rookie with 830 rushing yards and was selected as a first-team All-Pro in 1936 and 1939. He was also selected to play in the Pro Bowl in 1938 and 1941 and helped lead the Giants to the 1938 NFL Championship and the 1939 and 1941 NFL Championship Games. He was named in 1969 to the NFL 1930s All-Decade Team and was inducted into the Pro Football Hall of Fame in 1978.

After his playing career ended, Leemans worked briefly as a backfield coach for the Giants and at George Washington. He also operated a laundry and dry cleaning business and a duckpin bowling alley.

== Early life ==
Alphonse Leemans was born in 1912 in Superior, Wisconsin. His father Joseph Leemans (1887–1979) immigrated from Belgium in 1909 and worked as a hoister for the Pittsburg Coal Co. on the coal dock in Superior. His mother Hortense (1897–1964) was born in Illinois, the daughter of Belgian immigrants. Leemans had three younger sisters Carolyn, Dorothy, and Doris.

Leemans attended East High School in Superior. In his 1978 speech upon being inducted into the Pro Football Hall of Fame, Leemans recalled growing up in Superior: "I was a kid who used to work the iron ore boats on vacation from high school. I also worked as a fireman shoveling coal. But I was of hardy, Belgian stock and that early hard work helped me as a football player. I have achieved everything I ever wanted. I am a happy man."

== College career ==
In 1932, Leemans enrolled at the University of Oregon, where he was a member of the Oregon Ducks freshman football team. He then transferred to George Washington University, where he was the star of the George Washington Colonials football team from 1933 to 1935. In his three years at George Washington, he rushed for 2,382 yards on 490 carries for an average of 4.86 yards per carry. He also passed for 966 yards and returned 84 punts for 984 yards, an average of 11.7 yards per return.

== Professional career ==
In the fall of 1935, Wellington "Duke" Mara, son of New York Giants owner Tim Mara, was a 19-year old junior at Fordham University in New York. As a football enthusiast, the young Mara monitored the sports sections of dozens of out of town newspapers and maintained a clippings file of prospective Giants players. Leemans, then also a junior at George Washington University, had attracted the Duke's attention, so he sent a telegram arranging a meeting and traveled to Washington, DC, to see him. Mara made his pitch to Leemans, convincing him to play professionally for the Giants after graduation.

Signing Leemans would be complicated by the establishment of a player draft by National Football League owners at their annual meeting in Philadelphia in February 1936. Whereas previously the acquisition of NFL players had been a free-for-all, subject to the league's roster size limit (25 players in 1936), henceforth potential players would be systematically apportioned by sequential selection. Wellington Mara, still smitten by Leemans' running abilities, persuaded his father to make the little-known player the second round pick of the inaugural 1936 draft. A week after the draft the relationship was formalized when Leemans signed a $3,000 contract to play football for the club. The signing was so impactful that Mara later declared, "If I'm remembered for nothing else, I'd like to be remembered for discovering Tuffy Leemans."

In his first NFL season, Leemans played at the fullback position for the Giants and led the NFL with 830 rushing yards and an average of 69.2 rushing yards per game. He also impressed with his defensive play at the safety position. He was the only rookie to be honored by the NFL as a first-team player on the 1936 All-Pro Team. After the season ended, Leemans reported that he found it easier to make long gains in the NFL rather than college, citing better blocking in the professional ranks.

Following rumors that he intended to retire from professional football after one season, Leemans signed a contract in August 1937 to return to the Giants. During the 1937 season, Leemans did not have the same level of success as in 1936. Hank Soar took over as the Giants' leading rusher in 1937, and Leemans gained only 429 rushing yards, roughly half his total from the prior year. Despite the reduced offensive output, Leemans continued to garner credit for his overall play and was selected by the NFL and the New York Daily News as a second-team player on the 1937 All-Pro Team.

Leemans also played professional basketball during the off-season, joining the Heurich Brewers in Washington, D.C., after the 1937 NFL season.

Leemans continued to be one of the NFL's leading players, receiving either first- or second-team All-Pro honors every year from 1936 through 1942. He received first-team honors in 1936 and 1939 and second-team honors in each of the remaining years. He was also selected to play in the Pro Bowl in 1938 and 1941. He ranked second in the NFL in rushing yardage in 1938 with 463 yards and third in 1940 with 474 yards. He also helped lead the Giants to the 1938 NFL Championship as well as the 1939 and 1941 NFL Championship Games.

On December 7, 1941, the Giants celebrated "Tuffy Leemans Day," presenting him with a silver tray and $1,500 in defense bonds. The radio broadcast of the game on WOR was interrupted with an announcement of the Japanese attack on Pearl Harbor, and an urgent announcement was made at the Polo Grounds asking William J. Donovan (wartime head of the Office of Strategic Services) to call Operator 19 in Washington. However, most of the spectators and players at the Polo Grounds remained unaware of the attack until after the game. Leemans' attempts to enlist in the Navy and Army during World War II were rejected on multiple occasions due to defective hearing in one ear caused by a concussion sustained in a football game as well as poor eyesight.

Leemans retired from football after the 1942 season. He signed on as a backfield coach with the Giants in 1943, but shortly before the season started, he opted to return as a player for one final year. He appeared in 10 games during the 1943 season, only one as a starter. He retired again after the 1943 season.

Leemans appeared in 80 NFL games with the Giants from 1936 to 1943. He totaled 3,132 rushing yards on 919 carries (3.4 yards per carry) and 17 rushing touchdowns, 2,318 passing yards and 25 passing touchdowns, 422 receiving yards on 28 receptions, and 339 yards on punt and kickoff returns. Leemans also played on defense. Alex Wojciechowicz, a fellow Pro Football Hall of Fame inductee who played against Leemans, recalled: "Leemans was probably greater on defense than he was on offense. He was a bugger on defense, all over the field, always in on the action."

In 1969, Leemans was selected as one of the backs on the NFL 1930s All-Decade Team. In 1978, Leemans was inducted into the Pro Football Hall of Fame. At the induction ceremony, he was introduced by his high school football coach Peter Guzy. In his speech, Leemans mentioned two of his teammates, Mel Hein, the Hall of Fame center, and Leland Shaffer, who Leemans credited as "my top blocker".

== Coaching career ==
After his playing career ended, Leemans continued for one year as the Giants' backfield coach in 1944. However, he retired from coaching in August 1945 to devote his time to his laundry business.

He returned to coaching in 1946 as the part-time backfield coach for the George Washington Colonials while continuing to operate his laundry and dry cleaning business.

Leemans also coached football at St. John's College High School and Archbishop Carroll High School, both in Washington, D. C.

== NFL career statistics ==
Legend
	Won NFL championship
	Led the league
**Bold**	Career high

=== Rushing/receiving ===
Year	Team	Games		Rushing						Receiving				
Year	Team	GP	GS	Att	Yds	Avg	Y/G	Lng	TD	Rec	Yds	Avg	Lng	TD
1936	NYG	12	4	**206**	**830**	**4.0**	**69.2**	–	2	4	22	5.5	8	0
1937	NYG	9	8	144	429	3.0	47.7	–	0	**11**	157	14.3	18	1
1938	NYG	10	3	121	463	3.8	46.3	**75**	**4**	4	68	17.0	45	0
1939	NYG	10	2	128	429	3.4	42.9	–	3	8	**185**	**23.1**	**50**	**2**
1940	NYG	10	2	132	474	3.6	47.4	–	1	–	–	–	–	–
1941	NYG	11	**11**	100	332	3.3	30.2	26	**4**	–	–	–	–	–
1942	NYG	8	6	51	116	2.3	14.5	16	3	1	-10	-10.0	-10	0
1943	NYG	10	1	37	59	1.6	5.9	13	0	–	–	–	–	–
Career		80	37	919	3,132	3.4	39.2	75	17	28	422	15.1	50	3

=== Passing ===
Year	Team	Passing								
Year	Team	Cmp	Att	Pct	Yds	Avg	TD	Int	Lng	Rtg
1936	NYG	13	42	31.0	258	6.1	3	**6**	–	37.7
1937	NYG	5	20	25.0	64	3.2	1	1	–	36.2
1938	NYG	19	42	45.2	249	7.1	3	**6**	–	48.7
1939	NYG	12	26	46.2	198	7.6	0	2	–	40.2
1940	NYG	15	31	48.4	159	5.1	2	3	–	45.7
1941	NYG	31	66	47.0	475	7.2	4	5	44	59.8
1942	NYG	35	69	**50.7**	**555**	**8.0**	**7**	4	**50**	**87.5**
1943	NYG	**37**	**87**	42.5	360	4.1	5	5	28	50.0
Career		167	383	43.6	2,318	6.1	25	32	50	50.6

== Personal life ==
In June 1937, after his great rookie season, Leemans married Theodora Rinaldi at St. Michael's Catholic Church in Silver Spring, Maryland. They remained married for 41 years (until Leemans' death) had two children, Joseph, who died in 1977, and Diane, who passed in 2023.

Leemans and his wife lived in Silver Spring, Maryland. Leemans operated a duckpin bowling alley known as Tuffy Leemans' Glenmont Lanes. He also operated a laundry and dry cleaning business in the Washington, D. C., Silver Spring area dating back to and following his years as a football player. He was also active in the DC Touchdown Club and was elected as the organization's president in 1956.

Leemans' weight rose in his later years to 300 pounds from his playing weight of 180 pounds. In January 1979, less than six months after his induction into the Pro Football Hall of Fame, Leemans died from a heart attack at age 66 at his condominium in Hillsboro Beach, Florida. He was interred at Gate of Heaven Cemetery in Silver Spring.
