= Kaylor, Pennsylvania =

Unincorporated community in Pennsylvania, U.S.

Coordinates: 40.49604°N 78.66760°W

Kaylor is an unincorporated community in northern Cambria County, Pennsylvania, United States. It lies between Johnstown and Altoona, approximately 80 miles east of Pittsburgh. It is part of Munster Township, Pennsylvania.

== Notable people ==
Joe Stydahar, former NFL player and coach, West Virginia Sports Hall of Fame
