= George Grosvenor =

American football player (1910–2001)

Profile
- Positions: Quarterback, halfback, tailback

Personal information
- Born: August 4, 1910; Jefferson, Oklahoma, US
- Died: September 20, 2001 (aged 91); Pueblo, Colorado, US
- Listed height: 6 ft 0 in (1.83 m)
- Listed weight: 175 lb (79 kg)

Career information
- High school: Boulder (CO)
- College: Colorado

Career history
- St. Louis/Kansas City Blues (1934); Chicago Bears (1935–1936); Chicago Cardinals (1936–1937)

Awards and highlights
- First-team All-Rocky Mountain Conference (1933); AFL champion (1934); First-team All-AFC team (1934); Second-team All-Pro (1936)

Career statistics
- Rushing yards: 1,307
- Average: 3.6
- Touchdowns: 6
- Stats at Pro Football Reference

George Alfred Grosvenor (August 4, 1910 – September 20, 2001) was an American football player. He played college football for the University of Colorado Buffaloes and professional football for the St. Louis/Kansas City Blues in the American Football League and the Chicago Bears (1935–1936) and Chicago Cardinals (1936–1937) in the National Football League (NFL).

== Early life ==
Grosvenor was born in Jefferson, Oklahoma, in 1910. His father, George H. Grosvenor, was an English immigrant, and his mother, Okaka "Okie" Grosvenor, was an Indiana native. As of 1920, the family lived on a farm in Rock Island, Oklahoma. Grosvenor had two olders siblings, Teddy (born c. 1906) and Ruby (born c. 1909). At some point after 1920, the family moved to Colorado. Grosvenor attended Boulder High School in Boulder, Colorado.

== Football player ==
=== University of Colorado ===
Grosvenor attended the University of Colorado where he played for the school's basketball and football teams. As a sophomore, he was the starting quarterback for the 1931 Colorado football team. On Thanksgiving Day in 1931, he returned a kickoff 97 yards for a touchdown against Arizona. Over the next two seasons, he became known as a triple-threat man for the Colorado football team. As a senior in 1933, he was selected as the first-team quarterback on the All-Rocky Mountain Conference team.

=== St. Louis/Kansas City Blues ===
In 1934, Grosvenor played professional football as the starting quarterback for the St. Louis/Kansas City Blues of the American Football League (AFL). He led the team to the 1934 AFL championship with a 7-0-1 record and was selected by both the league's coaches and the Associated Press as the first-team quarterback on the All-AFL team. The AFL folded after the 1934 season.

=== Chicago Bears/Cardinals ===
In September 1935, Grosvenor joined the Chicago Bears of the National Football League (NFL). Grosvenor was moved to the halfback position with the Bears. During the 1935 NFL season, Grosvenor appeared in 11 games for the Bears, three as a starter, and totaled 234 rushing yards on 55 carries (4.3 yards per carry). He also completed 6 of 15 passes for 69 yards.

The 1935 season was Grosvenor's first as a backup player; he expressed dissatisfaction with his status and initially declined to report for the 1936 season. Grosvenor ultimately reported to the Bears for the 1936 season, though he was sold to the Chicago Cardinals after the first game of the season. The Cardinals moved him from the halfback to the tailback position. On November 29, 1936, Grosvenor scored both touchdowns, including a 66-yard run, in the Cardinals' 14-7 victory over the Bears. During the 1936 season, Grosvenor rushed for 612 yards on 170 carries (3.6 yards per carry). His rushing yardage ranked fifth best in the NFL for the 1936 season. At the end of the 1936, he was selected by the United Press as a second-team player on the 1936 All-Pro Team.

Grosvenor returned to the Cardinals in 1937. He again ranked fifth in the NFL in rushing yardage, totaling 461 yards on 143 carries.

== Family and later years ==
Grosvenor was married in April 1932 to Wilma A "Billie" Hibler (1912-2007) in Gilpin County, Colorado. They had two sons, George D. Grosvenor (born c. 1933) and Paul R. Grosvenor (born c. 1938).

In January 1938, Grosvenor accepted a job as a biology teacher and the head wrestling coach and assistant basketball coach at Golden High School in Golden, Colorado. In March 1938, he announced his retirement from professional football and agreed to become the head football and basketball coach at Centennial High School in Pueblo, Colorado, starting in September 1938. During the 1939-1940 academic year, he led the Centennial football team to runner-up status in the Colorado state championship game and the basketball team to a Colorado Class A state championship.

In February 1942, Grosvenor announced that he would resign his position at Centennial High School in June 1942 to accept a position with the engineering department of the Colorado Fuel and Iron company. In 1961, he published a paper about the company's basic oxygen steel-making plant in Pueblo, Colorado. In all, Grosvenor spent approximately 30 years with Colorado Fuel and Iron, retiring as the superintendent of steel production. He later worked for several years as a consultant to Fundidora Steel in Monterey, Mexico.

Grosvenor died in 2001 at age 91 in Pueblo.
