= Joe Stydahar =

American football player and coach (1912–1977)

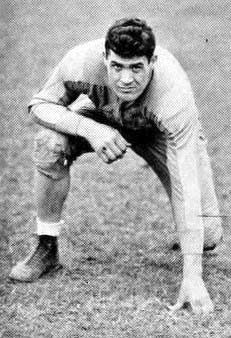
- Stydahar, c. 1936

No. 13, 18
- Position: Tackle

Personal information
- Born: March 17, 1912; Kaylor, Pennsylvania, U.S.
- Died: March 23, 1977 (aged 65); Beckley, West Virginia, U.S.
- Listed height: 6 ft 4 in (1.93 m)
- Listed weight: 233 lb (106 kg)

Career information
- High school: Shinnston (Shinnston, West Virginia)
- College: West Virginia (1933–1935)
- NFL draft: 1936: 1st round, 6th overall pick

Career history

Playing
- Chicago Bears (1936–1942; 1945–1946)

Coaching
- Los Angeles Rams (1947–1949) Line coach; Los Angeles Rams (1950–1951) Head coach; Chicago Cardinals (1953–1954) Head coach; Chicago Bears (1963–1965) Defensive line coach

Awards and highlights
- As a player: 3× NFL champion (1940, 1941, 1946); 4× First-team All-Pro (1937–1940); Second-team All-Pro (1936); 4× NFL All-Star (1938–1941); NFL 1930s All-Decade Team; NFL 75th Anniversary All-Time Team; 100 greatest Bears of All-Time; Third-team All-American (1935); Second-team Little All-American (1934); As a coach: 2× NFL champion (1951, 1963)

Career NFL statistics
- Games played: 84
- Games started: 53
- Interceptions: 1
- Fumble recoveries: 2
- Stats at Pro Football Reference

Head coaching record
- Regular season: 20–28–1 (.418)
- Postseason: 2–1 (.667)
- Career: 22–29–1 (.433)
- Coaching profile at Pro Football Reference
- Pro Football Hall of Fame
- College Football Hall of Fame

Joseph Lee Stydahar (Note: Sometimes listed as Joseph Leo Stydahar) (March 17, 1912 – March 23, 1977), nicknamed "Jumbo Joe", was an American professional football player and coach. He was inducted into the Pro Football Hall of Fame in 1967 and the College Football Hall of Fame in 1972.

Stydahar moved as a boy to Shinnston, West Virginia and played college football and basketball for the West Virginia Mountaineers. He was selected by the Chicago Bears in the first round of the 1936 NFL draft and played nine seasons as a tackle for the Bears from 1936 to 1942 and 1945 to 1946, interrupted by a two-year stint serving in the United States Navy. He was selected as a first-team All-Pro five consecutive years from 1936 to 1940 and helped the Bears win NFL championships in 1940, 1942, and 1946 NFL Championship Games.

After his playing career ended, Stydahar was the head coach of the Los Angeles Rams during the 1950 and 1951 seasons and the Chicago Cardinals during the 1953 and 1954 seasons. His 1950 and 1951 Rams teams both advanced to the NFL Championship Game, and the 1951 team won the championship. He also served as an assistant coach for the Rams (1947–1949) and Bears (1963–1965).

== Early life ==
Stydahar was born in 1912 in Kaylor, Pennsylvania, the son of Peter P. Stydahar (1877–1970) and Lucille M. Stydahar (1884–1941). At age eight, he moved with his family to Shinnston, West Virginia, where his father was a coal miner, and Stydahar also worked in the mines in his youth. At Shinnston High School, he was regarded as "the greatest schoolboy football and basketball player ever turned out in West Virginia". The football/track/soccer complex at Lincoln High School in Shinnston is named Stydahar Field.

== College career ==
Stydahar was recruited by both the University of Pittsburgh and West Virginia University. He initially went to Pittsburgh in the fall of 1931 and participated in the football team's preliminary practices, but then showed up at West Virginia seeking to enroll. According to one account, he returned home after tryouts at Pittsburgh and was taken in a car to Morgantown where he was hidden in a fraternity house by West Virginia football coach Greasy Neale "until Pitt gave up looking for him."

At West Virginia, Stydahar was six feet, four inches, weighed 220 pounds, possessed "one of the largest pairs of hands in the business", and played both basketball and football. He played at the tackle position for the football team from 1933 to 1935 and developed a reputation as a "vicious tackler" and "bruising blocker". As a junior in 1934, he blocked five punts and returned one of the blocks 17 yards for a touchdown. As a senior in 1935, he was responsible for stopping Pittsburgh's running game, holding the Panthers to one first down in the second half.

During Stydahar's three years with the West Virginia football team, the Mountaineers compiled records of and 3–5–3, 6–4, and 3–4–2, and lost three consecutive seasons against Pittsburgh by a combined score of 72 to 12. Sports writer Harry Grayson opined that the team's poor record and the small crowds to which it played impaired Stydahar's chances of being selected to All-America teams. In 1934, Stydahar was ignored by the major All-America selectors, though he reportedly received recognition on an All-American team selected by the players on the NFL's New York Giants. In 1935, the best Stydahar could muster was a selection on the Newspaper Enterprise Association's third-team.

Those who saw Stydahar play in college rated him among the best and was selected to play in both the East–West Shrine Game and the Chicago College All-Star Game in 1936. Pittsburgh coach Jock Sutherland, despite having been spurned by Stydahar in 1931, rated Stydahar as the best tackle he saw during the 1935 season and added: "I doubt that there is a more formidable tackle in the country." Heisman Trophy winner Jay Berwanger said: "I played in two all-star games with him and thought he was the best tackle by far of that collegiate group. He proved to me in those two games that he was a tremendous player."

In basketball, Stydahar was a three-year letterman at the center position. He set a single-game scoring record with 24 points against West Virginia Wesleyan in 1933.

== Professional playing player ==
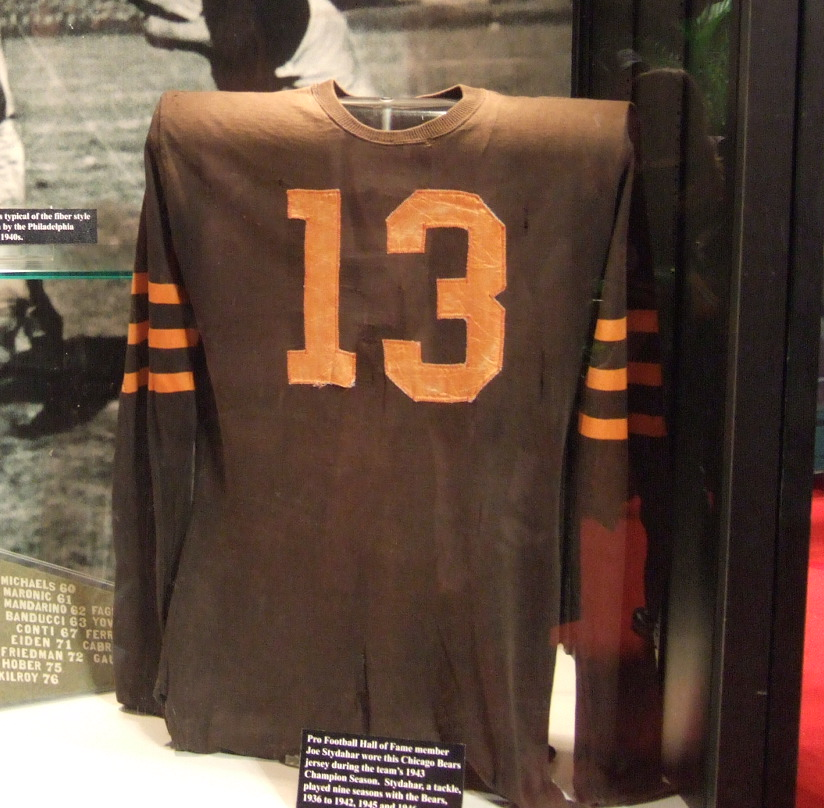
Stydahar's Chicago Bears uniform worn during his 1943 championship season.

While overlooked by All-America selectors, Stydahar was not overlooked in the 1936 NFL draft. He was selected by George Halas' Chicago Bears in the first round with the sixth overall pick, becoming the first player drafted by the Bears in the first NFL draft and the first lineman to be selected in the first round.

Stydahar ahead of his rookie season with the Bears.

As a rookie, Stydahar started all 12 games at left tackle for a 1936 Chicago Bears team that compiled a 9–3 record. He was selected as a first-team All-Pro by Collyer's Eye magazine and a second-team All-Pro by the NFL and UPI.

By 1937, Stydahar helped lead the Bears to the NFL Western Division title with a 9-1-1 record. He was recognized as one of the best players in the NFL, receiving the highest point total of any player at any position in voting for the Associated Press (AP) All-Pro team. The AP reported:

The standout player of the 1937 national pro football league season wasn't Slingin' Sammy Baugh . . ., but Joe Stydahar, veteran tackle of the Chicago Bears. That was the way the coaches of the 10 league clubs figured, at least, when it came to casting their ballots for the all-league team. ... Stydahar received 43 points out of a possible 50.

Stydahar played nine years as a tackle for the Bears from 1936 to 1942 and from 1945 to 1946, appearing in 84 NFL games. He continued to be acknowledged as one of the best players in the league through the 1930s. In 1939, the United Press rated him as "the league's best tackle" and "one of the toughest linemen in the league to take out." He was also ranked third among all NFL players in points received in the AP's 1939 All-Pro voting, trailing only Don Hutson and Dan Fortmann. In all, he was selected as a first-team All-Pro five consecutive years from 1936 to 1940. During his time with the club, the Bears won five NFL Western Division titles (1937, 1940, 1941, 1942, and 1946) and won the 1940, 1942, and 1946 NFL Championship Games.

Stydahar missed the 1943 and 1944 NFL seasons due to military service during World War II. He served as a lieutenant and gunnery officer in the United States Navy on the USS Monterey light aircraft carrier.

== Coaching career ==
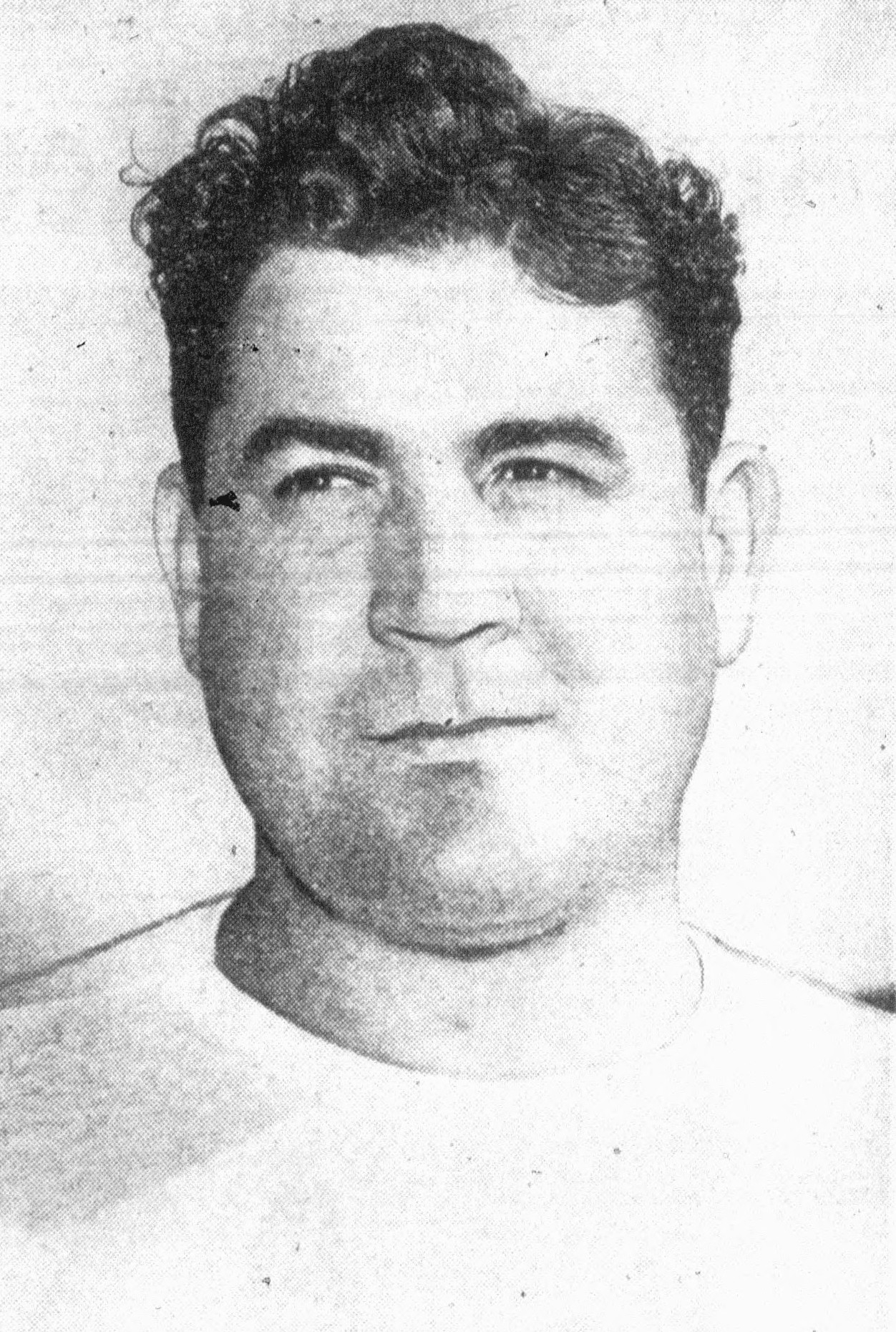
Stydahar, circa 1950.

=== Los Angeles Rams ===
In February 1947, Stydahar was hired by the Los Angeles Rams as an assistant coach. He served three years as the Rams' line coach from 1947 to 1949.

In February 1950, Sydahar took over as the Rams' head coach. In his first season as head coach, he led the 1950 Rams to the NFL Western Division championship with a 9–3 record and the top offense in the NFL (38.8 points per game). In the 1950 NFL Championship Game, the Rams lost, 30–28, to the Cleveland Browns on a field goal by Lou Groza with 27 seconds remaining in the game.

In his second season with the Rams, Stydahar led the 1951 Rams to the NFL championship with a victory over the Cleveland Browns in the 1951 NFL Championship Game.

Stydahar began the 1952 season as the Rams' head coach. After losing to the Cleveland Browns in the season opener, dissension between Stydahar and his backfield coach Hamp Pool became public. On September 30, Stydahar reached an agreement with Rams owner Dan Reeves under which Stydahar resigned and was paid him $11,900 to buy out his contract, and Pool was promoted as the new head coach.

=== Green Bay Packers ===
In mid-November 1952, Stydahar was hired by the Green Bay Packers. He served as a scout and part-time assistant coach for the balance of the 1952 season.

=== Chicago Cardinals ===
In January 1953, Stydahar was hired as head coach of the Chicago Cardinals. His Cardinals teams compiled records of 1–10–1 in 1953 and 2–10 in 1954. In June 1955, Stydahar and the Cardinals reached an agreement buying out the remainder of his three-year contract with the club.

=== Chicago Bears ===
In February 1963, George Halas hired Stydahar as defensive line coach for the Chicago Bears. Stydahar was credited with overhauling the Bears defensive line, helping to lead the 1963 Bears to the best scoring defense in the NFL and an NFL championship. The Bears dropped to sixth place in the Western Division in 1964, and Stydahar resigned from his position with the club at the end of the 1964 season in order devote his efforts to his work for a corrugated carton company.

=== Head coaching record ===
| Team | Year | Regular season | | | | | Postseason | | | |
| Team | Year | Won | Lost | Ties | Win % | Finish | Won | Lost | Win % | Result |
|---|---|---|---|---|---|---|---|---|---|---|
| LA | 1950 | 9 | 3 | 0 | .750 | 1st in NFL National | 1 | 1 | .500 | Lost to Cleveland Browns in NFL Championship. |
| LA | 1951 | 8 | 4 | 0 | .667 | 1st in NFL National | 1 | 0 | 1.000 | NFL Champions. |
| LA | 1952 | 0 | 1 | 0 | .000 | 2nd in NFL National | 0 | 0 | .000 | – |
| LA total | | 17 | 8 | 0 | .680 | | 2 | 1 | .667 | – |
| CHI | 1953 | 1 | 10 | 1 | .091 | 6th in NFL Eastern | – | – | – | – |
| CHI | 1954 | 2 | 10 | 0 | .167 | 6th in NFL Eastern | – | – | – | – |
| CHI total | | 3 | 20 | 1 | .130 | | – | – | – | – |
| NFL total | | 20 | 28 | 1 | .417 | | 2 | 1 | .667 | – |
| Total | | 20 | 28 | 1 | .417 | | 2 | 1 | .667 | – |

== Honors and awards ==
Stydahar received numerous honors for his football career, including the following:

- In 1950, he was one of the 25 charter inductees into the Helms Athletic Foundation's Professional Football Hall of Fame.
- In 1960, he was named to Sports Illustrated's Silver Anniversary All-America team.
- In 1967, he was inducted into the Pro Football Hall of Fame.
- In 1969, Stydahar was named to the NFL 1930s All-Decade Team.
- In 1972, he was inducted into the College Football Hall of Fame.
- In 1991, he was elected into the West Virginia University Sports Hall of Fame.
- In October 2022, he was inaugurated in the Croatian-American Sports Hall of Fame.

== Family and later years ==
Stydahar married Yolanda Monet Margowski in 1947. They were later divorced, but they had three sons, David (born 1948), Joseph (born 1952), and George, and a daughter, Stephanie (born 1955).

After being released by the Cardinals, Stydahar remained in the Chicago area where he had formed a cardboard box business with a partner. He continued in that business into the 1960s. In his later years, Stydahar lived in Highland Park, Illinois, where he was the eastern regional manager for a container company. He died of heart failure in 1977 at age 65 while on a business trip in Beckley, West Virginia. He was buried at the Shinnston Memorial Cemetery, adjacent to Stydahar Field, a sports complex named in his honor.

== Legacy ==
In 2015 the West Virginia Sports Writers Association named the top West Virginia high school football lineman award the Joe Stydahar award.
