= Lon Evans =

American football player (1911–1992)

Profile
- Position: Tackle

Personal information
- Born: December 25, 1911; Fort Worth, Texas, U.S.
- Died: December 11, 1992 (aged 80); Fort Worth, Texas, U.S.
- Listed height: 6 ft 2 in (1.88 m)
- Listed weight: 223 lb (101 kg)

Career information
- High school: Fort Worth (TX) Poly
- College: TCU

Career history
- Green Bay Packers (1933–1937)

Awards and highlights
- NFL champion (1936); Green Bay Packers Hall of Fame; First-team All-SWC (1932)

Career statistics
- Games played: 57
- Starts: 35
- Stats at Pro Football Reference

Lon Worth Evans (December 25, 1911 – December 11, 1992) was an American professional football player who was an offensive lineman for five seasons for the Green Bay Packers in the National Football League (NFL). He was inducted into the Green Bay Packers Hall of Fame in 1978.

Evans was born in Fort Worth, Texas and attended Polytechnic High School. He then played at Texas Christian University for coach Francis Schmidt. As a senior in 1932, Evans helped the TCU Horned Frogs to a Southwest Conference championship.

Following his NFL career, Evans became sheriff of Tarrant County, Texas. Nicknamed "Purple Lawman", he held the county's top law enforcement job from 1960 until his retirement in 1984. He was interred at Fort Worth's cemetery Greenwood Memorial Park along with Ray Renfro.
