= Dan Fortmann =

American football player (1916–1995)

No. 21
- Positions: Guard, linebacker, tackle

Personal information
- Born: April 11, 1916; Pearl River, New York, U.S.
- Died: May 23, 1995 (aged 79); Los Alamitos, California, U.S.
- Listed height: 6 ft 0 in (1.83 m)
- Listed weight: 210 lb (95 kg)

Career information
- High school: Pearl River
- College: Colgate (1933–1935)
- NFL draft: 1936: 9th round, 78th overall pick

Career history

Playing
- Chicago Bears (1936–1943)

Coaching
- Pittsburgh (1944) Line coach

Awards and highlights
- 3× NFL champion (1940, 1941, 1943); 6× First-team All-Pro (1938–1943); 2× Second-team All-Pro (1936, 1937); 3× NFL All-Star (1940–1942); NFL 1930s All-Decade Team; NFL 75th Anniversary All-Time Team; NFL 100th Anniversary All-Time Team; 100 greatest Bears of All-Time

Career NFL statistics
- Games played: 86
- Games started: 79
- Interceptions: 8
- Interception yards: 54
- Touchdowns: 1
- Stats at Pro Football Reference
- Pro Football Hall of Fame
- College Football Hall of Fame

Daniel John Fortmann (April 11, 1916 – May 23, 1995) was an American professional football guard and linebacker who played for the Chicago Bears in the National Football League (NFL). He played college football for the Colgate Red Raiders. Playing for Chicago from 1936 to 1943, he was selected as an All-Pro for seven consecutive years from 1937 to 1943. He was the Bears' team captain starting in 1940 and led the team to NFL championships in 1940, 1941, and 1943.

Fortmann was the line coach for the Pittsburgh Panthers football team in 1944 and in 1945 served in the United States Navy in the Pacific Ocean theater of World War II. He engaged in a medical practice in Southern California from 1946 to 1984 and was the team physician for the Los Angeles Rams from 1947 to 1963. He was inducted into the Pro Football Hall of Fame in 1965. He was diagnosed with Alzheimer's disease in 1983.

== Early life ==
Fortmann was born in 1916 in Pearl River, New York. His father, Bernhard Gerhart Fortmann, was a New York native and salesman of butter and eggs. His mother, Emma Margaret Doscher, was also a New York native.

Fortmann attended Pearl River High School, where he earned 12 varsity letters in sports and was the valedictorian of his class.

== College career ==
At age 16, Fortmann enrolled at Colgate University, where he played football, playing as a halfback as a freshman before moving to guard and becoming a starter in 1934 and 1935. Colgate football coach Andrew Kerr called Fortmann "the best player I ever handled." After the 1935 season, he was selected to play in multiple all-star games, including the East–West Shrine Game (January 1, 1937) and the Chicago College All-Star Game (September 1, 1937). Dick Hanley, who coached Fortmann in the Shrine Game, praised Fortmann as a great blocker and urged Chicago Bears owner George Halas to sign Fortmann.

In addition to playing football, Fortmann was also an outstanding student at Colgate. He received straight A's as a pre-med student and graduated with Phi Beta Kappa honors at age 19. He was also president of his senior class and a member of the Delta Upsilon (DU) fraternity.

== Professional football ==
At age 19, Fortmann was selected by the Chicago Bears in the ninth and final round (78th overall pick) of the 1936 NFL draft. After being drafted by the Bears, Fortmann was unsure whether he should attend medical school or play professional football. Bears owner George Halas persuaded Fortmann that he could do both and advanced funds to Fortmann for medical school. After speaking with Halas, Fortmann signed with the Bears in May 1936. At the time, he was the youngest person ever signed by an NFL team.

Fortmann in 1941

Due to his medical school obligations, Fortmann missed most of the Bears' sessions in his first four years with the team. In 1941, during his medical internship, he described pro football as "just the means to an end", the end being practicing medicine as a surgeon. Yet, Fortmann became fiercely loyal to Halas, saying: "Halas is the salt of the earth. There is nobody I admire and respect more than him."

Fortmann remained with the Bears for his entire professional football career, lasting for eight years from 1936 to 1943. He appeared in 86 games for the Bears. By 1939, Fortmann had established himself as one of the best most valuable players in the NFL. In voting by NFL coaches for the 1939 All-Pro Team, Fortmann received 37 points, the second-highest individual vote of any player.

Fortmann was team captain of the Bears starting in 1940. As team captain, he led the Bears to back-to-back NFL championships in 1940 and 1941 with records of 8–3 and 10–1. After the 1940 season, Fortmann was rated as the best lineman in the NFL. The United Press called him "the heart and soul" of the Bears' ground attack that "rolled up a vast amount of yardage overland."

In the 1940 NFL Championship Game, the Bears defeated the Washington Redskins by a 73–0 score. Fortmann later cited the 1940 championship game as proof of Halas' skill as a "master of psychology." The Bears had lost to the Redskins three weeks earlier, and Fortmann recalled that Halas kept reminding the Bears of that defeat every day, and when the team took the field for the championship game, "they were keyed the highest emotionally I ever saw them."

In August 1942, quarterback Bob Snyder called Fortmann "a perfect football player" and "the most important man on the Bear squad." The 1942 Bears compiled a perfect 11–0 record in the regular season and won the Western Division championship, but lost to the Washington Redskins in the 1942 NFL Championship Game.

Fortmann announced his retirement from the NFL in January 1943, but was persuaded to return for the 1943 season. He continued to practice medicine at Pittsburgh's Presbyterian Hospital during the 1943 season, flying in on Saturdays to play with the Bears on Sundays. The 1943 Bears compiled an 8–1–1 record and defeated the Washington Redskins in the 1943 NFL Championship Game, which proved to be Fortmann's last game as an NFL player. He announced his retirement five days after the championship game.

== Honors and awards ==
Fortmann received numerous honors and awards during and after his football career, including the following:

- Fortmann received All-Pro honors during each of his eight years in the NFL. He received second-team honors as a rookie in 1936 and first-team honors in 1937 (New York Daily News), 1938 (NFL, UP, Collyer's Eye, Pro Football Writers, INS), 1939 (NFL, UP, Collyer's Eye, Pro Football Writers, INS, New York Daily News), 1940 (AP, UP, NFL, Collyer's Eye, INS, New York Daily News), 1941 (AP, UP, NFL, Collyer's Eye, New York Daily News), 1942 (AP, NFL, INS, New York Daily News), and 1943 (AP, UP, Pro Football Illustrated, New York Daily News).
- In 1965, Fortmann was inducted into the Pro Football Hall of Fame as part of the Hall's third class of inductees. His Hall of Fame biography states: "On offense, he called signals for the linemen and was a battering-ram blocker. On defense, he was a genius at diagnosing enemy plays and a deadly tackler."
- In 1969, Fortmann was named to the NFL 1930s All-Decade Team.
- In 1978, he was inducted into the College Football Hall of Fame.
- In 1986, he received the NFL Alumni Career Achievement Award.
- In 2019, Fortmann was named to the NFL 100th Anniversary All-Time Team

== Later years and family ==
Fortmann was married to Mary Van Halteren in a ceremony at East Lansing, Michigan, on March 19, 1938. They had two sons, Thomas and Stephen.

Fortmann enrolled at Rush Medical School at the University of Chicago, where he studied medicine while playing for the Bears. He obtained his medical degree in 1940. He interned at Harper Hospital in Detroit and completed his surgical training at the University of Pittsburgh.

In the fall of 1944, he served as the line coach for the University of Pittsburgh Panthers football team.

In February 1945, Fortmann was commissioned as a lieutenant in the United States Navy. In April 1945, he was assigned to an attack transport ship in the South Pacific. He served in the Navy Medical Corps on a hospital ship in the Pacific theater.

In 1946, Fortmann was licensed to practice medicine in California and began practicing on Hollywood Boulevard in Los Angeles. He worked as a surgeon at St. Joseph Hospital in Burbank, California, from 1948 until 1984. He became the hospital's chief of staff in 1965. He also served as the team physician for the Los Angeles Rams from 1947 to 1963. Fortmann and his family resided in Toluca Lake and/or Burbank until 1974 when they moved to Pasadena.

Fortmann was diagnosed with Alzheimer's disease in 1983 and, in 1988, began living at the John Douglas French Center, a facility in Los Alamitos, California, specializing in the care of Alzheimer's patients. He died at French Center in May 1995 at age 79.
