= Collyer's Eye =

Sports journal published in Chicago (1915–1929)

Collyer's Eye was a weekly sports journal published in Chicago from 1915 to 1929. In 1929, it merged with The Baseball World to become Collyer's Eye and The Baseball World. It broke the story of the Black Sox Scandal a week after the final game. From 1923 to 1941, it published All-Pro teams.
