= All-Pro =

Professional American football honor

All-Pro is an honor bestowed upon professional American football players that designates the best player at each position during a given season. All-Pro players are typically selected by press organizations, who select an "All-Pro team," a list that consists of at least 22 players, one for each offensive and defensive position, plus various special teams players depending on the press organization that compiles the list. All-Pro lists are exclusively limited to the major leagues, usually only the National Football League; in the past, other leagues recognized as major, such as the American Football League of the 1960s or the All-America Football Conference of the 1940s, have been included in All-Pro lists.

== All-Pro teams by year ==
- 1920
- 1921
- 1922
- 1923
- 1924
- 1925
- 1926
- 1927
- 1928
- 1929
- 1930
- 1931
- 1932
- 1933
- 1934
- 1935
- 1936
- 1937
- 1938
- 1939
- 1940
- 1941
- 1942
- 1943
- 1944
- 1945
- 1946
- 1947
- 1948
- 1949
- 1950
- 1951
- 1952
- 1953
- 1954
- 1955
- 1956
- 1957
- 1958
- 1959
- 1960
- 1961
- 1962
- 1963
- 1964
- 1965
- 1966
- 1967
- 1968
- 1969
- 1970
- 1971
- 1972
- 1973
- 1974
- 1975
- 1976
- 1977
- 1978
- 1979
- 1980
- 1981
- 1982
- 1983
- 1984
- 1985
- 1986
- 1987
- 1988
- 1989
- 1990
- 1991
- 1992
- 1993
- 1994
- 1995
- 1996
- 1997
- 1998
- 1999
- 2000
- 2001
- 2002
- 2003
- 2004
- 2005
- 2006
- 2007
- 2008
- 2009
- 2010
- 2011
- 2012
- 2013
- 2014
- 2015
- 2016
- 2017
- 2018
- 2019
- 2020
- 2021
- 2022
- 2023
- 2024
- 2025

== History ==
Beginning in 1923, All-Pro teams have traditionally been assembled from press polls of individually voting sportswriters. After polling the writers, the votes are tallied to determine the selected players and the results have historically been published through various news syndicates. Today, the teams are mostly published online or announced on various televised sports programs. Some organizations publish two All-Pro lists, a first team and a second team, with the first consisting of more prominent players than the second.

The Associated Press (AP) and its All-Pro selections are the most widely recognized today. Other polls include the United Press International All-Pro poll, which began in the 1940s and continued in various forms until 1997, the Newspaper Enterprise Association All-Pro team, which ran from 1955 until 1992, and the Pro Football Writers Association All-Pro teams, which were inaugurated in 1966 and continue to be released annually. The NFL itself compiled official All-Pro lists beginning in 1931 but abandoned the practice in 1942.

The All-Pro designation, while not officially sanctioned by the NFL, is generally considered a more prestigious honor than selections to the Pro Bowl, the NFL's annual all-star game. A minimum of twice as many Pro Bowlers are selected as first and second team All-Pro slots combined. This is because, in 2010, the date of the Pro Bowl game was permanently moved to the week before Super Bowl, ensuring that the Super Bowl would always be the last game of the season. Since they are preparing for the championship, all Pro Bowl selections bound for the Super Bowl are replaced by alternates, as are any Pro Bowl selections who decline to play due to injury or lack of interest. Both the original selection and alternate will be credited as being a member of that year's Pro Bowl squad. This results in a larger number of picks than the All-Pro list, which does not have alternates.

== Selecting entities ==
=== National Football League ===
The NFL compiled its own 11-man "All-League" teams beginning in 1931. Through the 1939 NFL season players selected to this elite list were chosen by the coaches of the league; however, beginning in 1940, the selection of this team was turned over to the membership of the Professional Sports Writers Association. Selection of this team ended after the 1942 season.

=== Associated Press ===
The AP began selecting All-Pros in 1940, and is the longest running annual selector of the top NFL players. The All-Pro Team is an annual selection of the best players in the NFL by position as selected by a national panel of AP media members. Unlike selection to the Pro Bowls, votes are cast for outstanding players by position without consideration for whether the player competes in the American Football Conference (AFC) or National Football Conference (NFC).

The first team consists of the top one or two players at each position; the second team consists of the runners-up at each position. One player is selected at quarterback, fullback, tight end, center, punter, kicker, and return specialist, while two players are selected at running back, wide receiver, offensive tackle, offensive guard, outside linebacker, inside/middle linebacker, defensive end, defensive tackle, cornerback, and safety. In 2016, for the first time, the AP picked specific positions on the offensive line, a "flex" player on offense, and a fifth defensive back. In 2020, the "flex" position was discontinued and replaced with a third wide receiver slot. Beginning with the 2022 season, voters list choices for both the first and second teams; prior to 2022, voters only listed candidates for the first team, with the second team made up of the runners-up (if any) at that position.

The AP claims that the selection panel is a national one, but some NFL media markets such as Detroit, a city that has had an NFL team since 1934, do not have a vote.

=== United Press International ===
Also a press poll, it began in the 1930s and continued until 1969. In 1970 UPI began selecting All-AFC and All-NFC teams, which ran through 1996.

=== The Sporting News ===
The Sporting News published All-Conference teams beginning in the 1950s. In 1980 it began choosing an All-Pro team, rather than two All-Conference teams. Since its teams are published in Total Football: The Official Encyclopedia of the NFL, they are recognized by the NFL and the Pro Football Hall of Fame.

=== Newspaper Enterprise Association ===
The Newspaper Enterprise Association All-Pro team was different from the press polls. It was created by Murray Olderman in 1955 and considered the "players' All-Pro Team" as it was a poll of NFL players as opposed to writers, which were used by other publications. In 1984, sportswriter Paul Zimmerman touted the NEA for its All-Pro team, since they involved polling the players, rather than sportswriters' opinions. The NEA poll was last published in 1992.

=== Pro Football Writers Association ===
The PFWA All-NFL Team was inaugurated in 1966 and is still released each year. A press poll of the members of the Pro Football Writers Association, it has been released since the 1990s in Pro Football Weekly. Additionally, the editors and writers of Pro Football Weekly have personally selected All-AFC and All-NFC teams since 1970.

=== National Football League Players' Association ===
The NFLPA began selecting a Players' All-Pro team in 2022, voted on solely by NFL players.

== Compensatory draft selections ==
The 2020 Collective Bargaining Agreement between the NFL and NFL Players Association specifically stipulated that being selected to either the AP or PFWA first teams (but not the Sporting News team) is a consideration in the ranking of players that determines the assignment of compensatory draft picks for teams losing free agents.

== Other selectors ==
=== Past ===
- Buffalo Evening News
- Collyer's Eye
- George Halas
- Green Bay Press-Gazette (1923–1935)
- International News Service
- New York Daily News (1937–1961, 1963–1969)
- Rock Island Argus, selected by the paper's sports editor Bruce Copeland
- Pro Football Illustrated (1943–1948)

=== Present ===
- Pro Football Focus began selecting All-Pro first and second teams after the 2009 season, and continue to release team selections yearly.
- Sports Illustrated
- USA Today

== See also ==
- College Football All-America Team
- All-MLB Team
- All-NBA Team
- NHL All-Star team
