= 1939 All-Pacific Coast football team =

American all-star college football team

1939 Pacific Coast Conference football standings
	Conf.					Overall
Team	W		L		T	W		L		T
No. 3 USC $	5	–	0	–	2	8	–	0	–	2
No. 7 UCLA	5	–	0	–	3	6	–	0	–	4
Oregon State	6	–	1	–	1	9	–	1	–	1
Washington	4	–	4	–	0	4	–	5	–	1
Oregon	3	–	3	–	1	3	–	4	–	1
Washington State	3	–	5	–	0	4	–	5	–	0
Montana	1	–	2	–	0	3	–	6	–	0
California	2	–	5	–	0	3	–	7	–	0
Stanford	0	–	6	–	1	1	–	7	–	1
Idaho	0	–	3	–	0	2	–	6	–	0
$ – Conference champion; Rankings from AP Poll

The 1939 All-Pacific Coast football team consists of American football players chosen by various organizations for All-Pacific Coast teams for the 1939 college football season. The organizations selecting teams in 1939 included the Associated Press (AP) and the United Press (UP).

The USC Trojans won the Pacific Coast Conference (PCC) championship, compiled an undefeated 8–0–2 record, were ranked No. 3 in the final AP poll, and were represented by three players on the first teams selected by AP or UP: quarterback Grenny Lansdell (AP, UP), guard Harry Smith (AP, UP) and tackle Phil Gaspar (UP).

UCLA finished second in the PCC with a 6–0–4 record, were ranked #7 in the final AP Poll, and placed two players on either the AP or UP first teams: halfback Kenny Washington (AP, UP) and end Woodrow Strode (AP).

Two players from outside the PCC received first-team honors. Both played for the Santa Clara Broncos: end Bill Anahu (AP, UP) and center John Schiechl (AP, UP).

== All-Pacific Coast selections ==
=== Quarterback ===
- Grenny Lansdell, USC (AP-1; UP-1)
- Ambrose Schindler, USC (AP-2; UP-2)

=== Halfbacks ===
- Kenny Washington, UCLA (AP-1; UP-1)
- Dean McAdams, Washington (AP-1; UP-2)
- Jay Graybeal, Oregon (AP-2; UP-1)
- Bob Hoffman, USC (AP-2)
- Jim Johnson, Santa Clara (UP-2)

=== Fullback ===
- Jim Kisselburgh, Oregon State (AP-1; UP-1)
- Norm Standlee, Stanford (AP-2)
- Art Zimmerman, San Jose State (UP-2)

=== Ends ===
- William "Bill" Anahu, Santa Clara (AP-1; UP-1)
- Woody Strode, UCLA (AP-1)
- Jay MacDowell, Washington (UP-1)
- Al Krueger, USC (AP-2; UP-2)
- Vic Reginato, Oregon (UP-2)
- Bill Fisk, USC (AP-2)

=== Tackles ===
- Jim Stuart, Oregon (AP-1; UP-1)
- Lee Artoe, California (AP-1; UP-2)
- Phil Gaspar, USC (AP-2; UP-1)
- Uell Stanley Andersen, Stanford (AP-2)
- Howard Stoecker, USC (UP-2)

=== Guards ===
- Harry Smith, USC (AP-1; UP-1) (College Football Hall of Fame)
- Elbie Schultz, Oregon State (AP-1; UP-1)
- Jack Sommers, UCLA (AP-2; UP-2)
- Len Younce, Oregon State (AP-2; UP-2)

=== Centers ===
- John Schiechl, Santa Clara (AP-1; UP-1)
- Rudy Mucha, Washington (AP-2; UP-2)

== Key ==
AP = Associated Press

UP = United Press: "The sports editors and writers of United Press newspapers in the Far West today present their Pacific Coast all-star football team in 1939."

Bold = Consensus first-team selection of both the AP and UP

== See also ==
- 1939 College Football All-America Team
