= 1940 Rose Bowl =

American college football game

- 26th Rose Bowl Game
USC Trojans	Tennessee Volunteers
(7–0–2)	(10–0)
PCC	SEC
14	0
Head coach: Howard Jones	Head coach: Robert Neyland
AP 3	AP 2
	1	2	3	4	Total
USC	0	7	0	7	14
Tennessee	0	0	0	0	0
- Date: January 1, 1940
- Season: 1939
- Stadium: Rose Bowl
- Location: Pasadena, California
- MVP: Ambrose Schindler (USC QB)
- Favorite: Even
- National anthem: Spirit of Troy
- Referee: Louis Conlan (Pacific Coast; split crew: Pacific Coast, SEC)
- Halftime show: Spirit of Troy
- Attendance: 92,200

The 1940 Rose Bowl was the 26th edition of the college football bowl game, played at the Rose Bowl in Pasadena, California, on Monday, January 1.

In a matchup of undefeated teams, the third-ranked USC Trojans of the Pacific Coast Conference (PCC) shut out the #2 Tennessee Volunteers of the Southeastern Conference (SEC), 14–0. USC quarterback Ambrose Schindler was named the Player of the Game when the award was created in 1953 and selections were made retroactively.

== Teams ==
The Rose Bowl committee had both USC and Tennessee on their list and it was likely that USC and Tennessee would play each other. The Volunteers were offered a berth in the Sugar Bowl on November 25; they were also in the mix for the Cotton Bowl, which would have pitted them against the #1 Texas A&M Aggies. But the Rose Bowl committee did not extend official invitations until December 10, 1939.

=== Tennessee ===
In the regular season, Tennessee shut out all ten opponents. Led by two All-American guards, Ed Molinski and Bob Suffridge, the Volunteers were forced to play without their star tailback George Cafego, who fell victim to a knee injury against The Citadel on November 11. After a 7–0 win over Auburn on December 9, Tennessee officially was extended an invitation to the Rose Bowl.

=== USC ===
The Trojans opened the season against Oregon, tying the Ducks 7–7, then scored three straight shutouts, becoming ranked #8 following the second, a 26–0 win over Illinois. A November 4 game featured #7 USC defeating #11 Oregon State 19–7. At Notre Dame on November 25, #4 USC defeated the #7 Irish 20–12. A win over Washington by scoring in the last 1:15 set up the very first epic UCLA–USC rivalry matchup.

Kenny Washington, Woody Strode, Jackie Robinson, and Ray Bartlett starred on the Bruins, in which African Americans made up three of the four backfield players. This was a rarity to have so many African Americans when only a few dozen at all played on college football teams. The ninth-ranked Bruins also were also undefeated, with three ties. This was the first UCLA–USC rivalry football game with national implications, as it was the first with the Rose Bowl on the line for both.

The attendance of 103,303 was the second largest college football crowd ever in the Los Angeles Memorial Coliseum. UCLA attempted a pass on fourth down, instead of kicking a field goal. Bobby Robertson of USC knocked down Ned Matthews’ four-yard pass in the end zone with less than five minutes to play to preserve the scoreless tie. The Pacific Coast Conference voted to have USC, with a 7–0–2 record play in the Rose Bowl instead of UCLA with a 6–0–4 record. Art Cohn, sports editor of the Oakland Tribune implied that race may have been a factor in the decision, since teams from the south refused to play against African Americans. After the regular season, the Trojans were named national champions.

== Game summary ==
Trojan backs Granny Lansdell and Ambrose Schindler rushed for 51 and 81 yards respectively, for a team total of 229 yards rushing. Schindler scored one touchdown and passed to Al Krueger — the hero from the previous year — for the other. Head coach Howard Jones earned his second straight Rose Bowl victory, and his fifth in as many appearances.

=== Scoring ===
==== First quarter ====
No scoring

==== Second quarter ====
- USC – Ambrose Schindler 1-yard run (Jones kick)

==== Third quarter ====
No scoring

==== Fourth quarter ====
- USC – Al Krueger 2-yard pass from Schindler (Gaspar kick)

== Aftermath ==
USC head coach Jones died less than two years later, in the summer of 1941. Joe Shell, the captain of the Trojans who became an oil company owner and a state assemblyman, died on April 8, 2008.

USC bases its 1939 national championship claim on winning the Dickinson System, a formula devised by a University of Illinois professor which awarded the only championship trophy between 1926 and 1940. In 1939, Dickinson was the only poll or system to rank the Trojans number one. USC's stance, however, is in keeping with that of most other schools which won the Dickinson title; only Notre Dame, which won the Dickinson crown in 1938, does not claim a major national title for that year. Since at least 1969, USC had not listed 1939 as a national championship year; but in 2004, USC once again began recognizing the 1939 team as national champions after it determined that it qualified.

Ambrose "Amblin' Amby" Schindler went on to be the MVP in the 1940 College All-Star Game in Chicago in late August. He was inducted into the San Diego Hall of Champions Breitbard Hall of Fame in 1973. He was inducted into the USC Athletic Hall of Fame in 1997. He was inducted into the Rose Bowl Hall of Fame in 2002.

Tennessee player Bill Barnes was later the head coach of the UCLA Bruins and led them to the 1962 Rose Bowl.
