= Uell Stanley Andersen =

American football player and author (1917–1986)

Stan Andersen
- Anderson, 1939

No. 39, 82
- Positions: Tackle, end

Personal information
- Born: September 14, 1917; California, U.S.
- Died: September 24, 1986 (aged 69)
- Listed height: 6 ft 2 in (1.88 m)
- Listed weight: 218 lb (99 kg)

Career information
- High school: Kingsburg (CA)
- College: Stanford
- NFL draft: 1940: 12th round, 101st overall pick

Career history
- Cleveland Rams (1940–1941); Detroit Lions (1941)

Awards and highlights
- Second-team All-PCC (1939)

Career NFL statistics
- Games: 22
- Games started: 11
- Receiving yards: 79
- Stats at Pro Football Reference

Uell Stanley Andersen (September 14, 1917 – September 24, 1986) was an American professional football player and self-help and short story author during the 1950s and 1960s. He is best known for his book, Three Magic Words.

== Biography ==
Born to Norwegian-American parents in Portland, Oregon, Andersen attended Stanford University. He played college football for Stanford and was captain of the 1939 Stanford Indians football team. He was also one of the nation's top competitors in the shot put while attending Stanford. He played professional football in the National Football League (NFL) as a tackle and end for the Cleveland Rams (1940–1941) and Detroit Lions (1941). He appeared in 22 NFL games, 11 as a starter, and caught seven passes for 79 yards.

He had a number of careers, including running an advertising agency, wild-catting for oil, and logging at the Columbia Sawmill. By the early 1950s, Andersen had moved to Los Angeles, California, where he became a successful businessman.

As a young man, Andersen began studying the concepts of Christian Science, described in Mary Baker Eddy's book, Science and Health. He later began to study New Thought—in particular the "Science of Mind" by Ernest Holmes. Though both lived in Los Angeles at the same time, it has not been determined whether Andersen and Holmes knew each other.

In 1952, Andersen began teaching a class on New Thought. The lessons from that class became his book, Three Magic Words, which has subsequently become a classic in the New Thought literature. The book has been linked to the New Age philosophical concept known as the Law of Attraction.

Anderson also wrote about non-spiritual subjects.

He died in September 1986 in Lincoln City, Oregon.

== Philosophy ==
=== A Sustained Belief Will Manifest in the Physical World ===
Andersen taught the New Thought concept of "Universal Mind". According to Andersen, the "Universal Mind is a vast and all-encompassing mental and spiritual being in whom all things and events exist." According to Andersen, the Universal Mind, or God, manifests – or literally reflects – the dominant belief system of all living things. When one understands this cause and effect relationship, it becomes possible to consciously use Universal Mind to shape the physical world.

In Three Magic Words, Andersen makes the argument that the physical world is derived from the mental. He argues that a sustained mental image, if backed by faith (i.e. a belief that the image is real, or will become real), will become reality.

This can be done by using a "spiritual prototype", or mental equivalent of that which one wants to manifest in the physical world. The concept of a "spiritual prototype" originated in the New Thought literature in the early 20th century. Specifically, Andersen said the following:

All things and all circumstances must first be created on the mental plane. When such creation is clear-cut and born of faith and conviction, nothing can stop this image from becoming real. Once this image has come into your mind and you have accepted, you have done all that it is necessary for you to do. All the process of creation—time place, and circumstance—must be left in the hands of the all-knowing Subconcious Mind. The physical circumstance you desire may come from a direction you expect or it may come in such a way and such a manner as you have never dreamed. Don't strain or urge or be impatient. Simply have faith and let go...You have nothing to do but create the mental image with complete faith, and with that simple act the process is completely done. Be assured that the image will become real in your physical world, for you are dealing with law and law alone.

In other words, his philosophy is similar to that in the New Testament, which teaches, "As ye believe, so shall it be done unto you." More recently, this idea is reflected in the book, The Secret, by Rhonda Byrne.

Andersen argued that it was possible to prove his theory by conducting a few mental experiments, aided by means of meditation. After running these experiments, with complete faith in the outcome, it is possible to demonstrate – at least on a subjective basis – that there is a relationship between thought and physical reality.

=== Evil is the Result of False Thinking ===
The remainder of Andersen's theory followed from that simple premise. Since physical matter is created first on the mental plane, Andersen argued that good and evil events were also created by thought. This leads to a startling conclusion. If evil is created first on a mental plane by thought, then it becomes possible to abolish evil by refusing to believe in its existence. Andersen argued that evil was error, and that mankind should simply refuse to accept its existence. Specifically, he wrote the following:

If we know that evil proceeds from thought just as good proceeds from thought, we can establish eternal sentinel on our minds to guide our thoughts in the paths of good and progress...Being illusion, evil dissipates with consummate ease.

Andersen was not the first to argue that evil does not exist, and is a creation of man's false beliefs about the world. That notion had been expressed by earlier New Thought writers, in particular, Ernest Holmes, whom Andersen cites in his writing. As explained by Holmes, "The time must come when evil ... shall be rolled up like a scroll and numbered with the things which were once thought to be." Prior to Holmes, the Christian Science community argued that illness was a false belief, which manifested in the patient's body. Change the belief, and the patient gets a different result, i.e. health. Holmes and Andersen expanded on this idea by generalizing it to all evil, which they argued also did not exist, and was a product of false beliefs.

=== Theory of Evolution ===
In Three Magic Words, Andersen proposes a theory of evolution. He argues that all living creatures share the same universal mind – and accompanying power to create – with human beings. This leads to the observed effects of evolution, as living creatures aspire for greater physical abilities to ensure their survivability. Andersen writes:

This mind or intelligence is not in man alone, but in every living thing. Behold the process of evolution and you will see desire being projected into the Universal Mind and returning in physical reality. The fish experiences land and desires to walk and becomes a reptile. The reptile experiences air and desires to fly and becomes a bird. The reptile desires size and strength and becomes a horse. Bears, wolves, tigers, lions, snakes, everything that creeps and crawls and flies and swims and burrows and builds and desires -- all are results of thought or desire projected into the Universal Creative Mind of God.

=== The Lock ===
Andersen argued that this power, often described as the "law of attraction", can be directed at will by controlling the sustained, believed images in our mind.

Establishing sentinel over our thoughts is not as easy as it sounds. Andersen recognized that humans are constrained by existing beliefs about themselves and the world, fixed in their subconscious by past experience. He called this the "lock", because it made it difficult for a person to believe in the desired outcome. Andersen argued that it was possible to break the lock of negative past experiences by means of meditation, and steadfastly creating mental images of the desired outcome. He recommended daily meditation, in support of his thought experiments. "Only hundreds of pages of discourse and proof will weaken its prejudice."

== Influence ==
Through the work of Andersen and Holmes, the Law of Attraction acquired a degree of currency with the Hollywood set in the 1950s and 1960s.

- Elvis Presley owned a copy of Andersen's book, Three Magic Words. It was sold at an auction at Elvis's home, Graceland, on August 12, 2018.
- Gloria Swanson – the highest paid actress of the 1920s and a nominee for the first Academy Award ever given for Best Actress – also owned a copy of Three Magic Words. Swanson gave an autographed copy of the book as a gift to fellow actress, Ruth Ford, on June 1, 1957. The book was later sold by Ford's estate.The original signed book is presently in a collection owned by civil liberties attorney Elliott J. Schuchardt.
- Self-help writer Wayne Dyer cited Anderson as an influence, and would periodically quote from Three Magic Words in his speaking.

== Adaptations ==
The 2010 documentary film 3 Magic Words was inspired by Andersen's book Three Magic Words. The film was written, directed, and produced by Michael Perlin and co-produced by Maura Hoffman. The film was produced over four years. The lead is played by Gabriella Ethereal and the film is narrated by Cameron Smith.

The film uses interviews, computer-animated graphics, and narration to address the question "Who Am I?". It does this while following a fictional account of a self-destructive young woman who has recently come out of a coma and doesn't know who she is. People interviewed in the film include Neale Donald Walsch, Gary Renard, Debbie Ford, Jasmuheen, and others. The film covers spiritual concepts from eastern mysticism and the New Age movement.

== Non-fiction ==
- Three Magic Words (1954)
- The Secret of Secrets: Your Key to Subconscious Power (1958)
- The Magic in Your Mind (1961)
- O Poder da Energia Mental (1961)
- Success Cybernetics: Practical Applications of Human Cybernetics (1970)
- The Key to Power and Personal Peace (1972)
- The Greatest Power in the Universe (1971)
- The Secret Power of the Pyramids (1977)

== Fiction ==
- The Smoldering Sea (1953, novel)
- Hard and Fast (novel)
- Turn Ever so Quickly (short story)
- The Other Jesus (1960, Muhlenberg Press, novel)
- The Charlatans (screenplay)
- Seven Days of Light (unpublished)
