= Grenny Lansdell =

American football player (1918–1984)

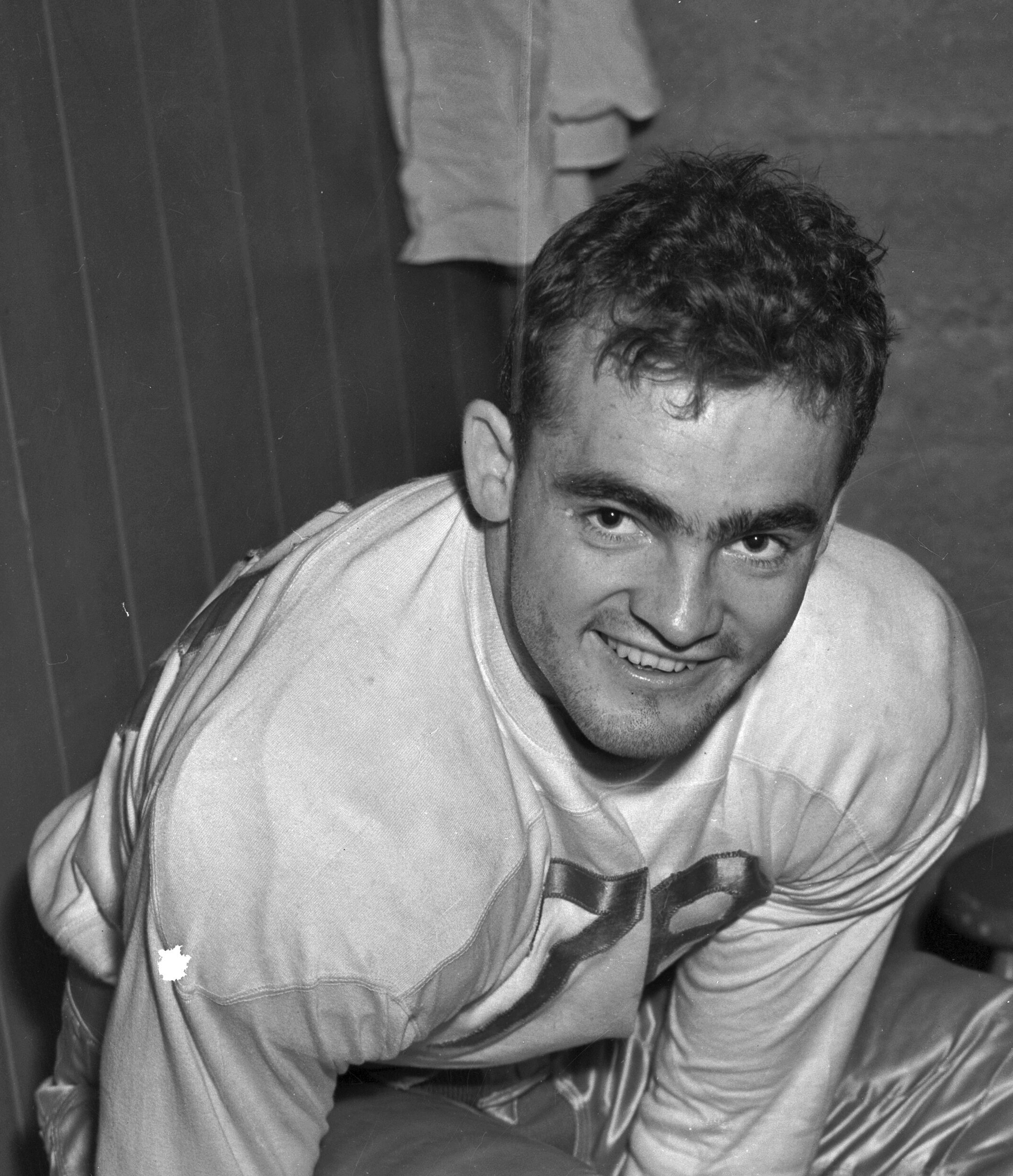
- Lansdell in 1938 as a USC player

No. 22
- Position: Halfback

Personal information
- Born: July 16, 1918; Great Barrington, Massachusetts
- Died: May 14, 1984 (aged 65); Long Beach, California, U.S.
- Listed height: 6 ft 0 in (1.83 m)
- Listed weight: 190 lb (86 kg)

Career information
- High school: Pasadena (Pasadena, California, U.S.)
- College: USC
- NFL draft: 1940: 1st round, 10th overall pick

Career history
- New York Giants (1940)

Awards and highlights
- Second-team All-American (1938); Third-team All-American (1939); 2× First-team All-PCC (1938, 1939)

Career NFL statistics
- Rushing yards: 9
- Average: 1.3
- Stats at Pro Football Reference

Grenville Archer Lansdell, Jr. (July 16, 1918 – May 14, 1984) was an American football halfback who played for the National Football League (NFL)'s New York Giants during the 1940 season.

Prior to his NFL career, Lansdell played college football at the University of Southern California (USC), filling multiple roles. His official position in college was quarterback, but he served as a running back, while also throwing passes and punting. The Daily Pilot described Lansdell as "one of the last of the truly great all-around triple-threat stars in college football history". In addition, Lansdell was a punt returner and played safety on defense. Offensively, he led USC in passing yards from 1937 to 1939, and in rushing yards in 1938 and 1939; USC reached the Rose Bowl in both seasons. The 1939 Trojans were recognized as national champions by the Dickinson System.

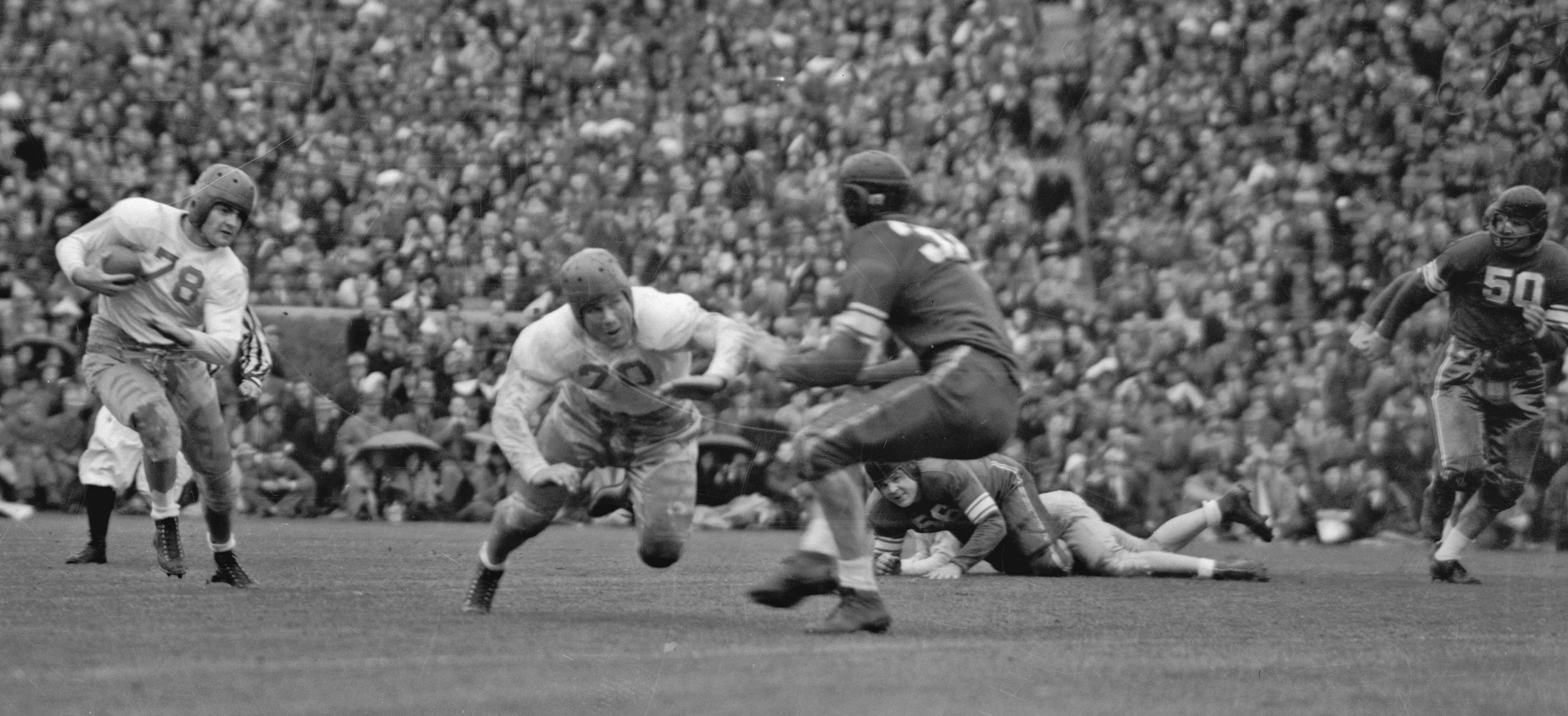
Lansdell (far left) at the 1939 Rose Bowl

Lansdell appeared in USC's season opener in 1937 against Pacific as a replacement for an injured player, throwing for two touchdowns; later in the year, he had 117 yards rushing in a 12–12 tie with Oregon State. His 1938 performances included a punt return for a touchdown against Ohio State, a touchdown in a USC win over third-ranked California, and another punt return touchdown in a loss to Washington. In 1939, he ran for 101 yards and scored two touchdowns in a 20–12 USC win over Notre Dame, and one week later threw a game-winning touchdown pass against Washington. In the 1940 Rose Bowl, which concluded the Trojans' 1939 season, Lansdell contributed 51 rushing yards in a 14–0 victory over Tennessee.

In the 1940 NFL draft, the Giants chose Lansdell with the tenth overall pick. He played one season for the team, appearing in two games and rushing for nine yards in seven attempts; he also completed two passes in three attempts. Lansdell's football career was interrupted in 1941, when he joined the U.S. Army. During World War II, Lansdell was a pilot with the Army Air Corps. Lansdell did not return to football following the war; instead, he piloted flights for Trans World Airlines for more than 30 years.
