= 1939 USC Trojans football team =

American college football season

1939 USC Trojans football

National champion (Dickinson System) PCC champion Rose Bowl champion

Rose Bowl, W 14–0 vs. Tennessee
- Conference: Pacific Coast Conference

Ranking
- AP: No. 3
- Record: 8–0–2 (5–0–2 PCC)
- Head coach: Howard Jones (15th season)
- Captain: Joe Shell
- Home stadium: Los Angeles Memorial Coliseum

1939 Pacific Coast Conference football standings
	Conf.					Overall
Team	W		L		T	W		L		T
No. 3 USC $	5	–	0	–	2	8	–	0	–	2
No. 7 UCLA	5	–	0	–	3	6	–	0	–	4
Oregon State	6	–	1	–	1	9	–	1	–	1
Washington	4	–	4	–	0	4	–	5	–	1
Oregon	3	–	3	–	1	3	–	4	–	1
Washington State	3	–	5	–	0	4	–	5	–	0
Montana	1	–	2	–	0	3	–	6	–	0
California	2	–	5	–	0	3	–	7	–	0
Stanford	0	–	6	–	1	1	–	7	–	1
Idaho	0	–	3	–	0	2	–	6	–	0
$ – Conference champion; Rankings from AP Poll

The 1939 USC Trojans football team was an American football team that represented the University of Southern California (USC) in the Pacific Coast Conference (PCC) during the 1939 college football season. In their 15th year under head coach Howard Jones, the Trojans compiled an 8–0–2 record (5–0–2 against PCC opponents), shut out six of ten opponents, won the PCC championship, and outscored all opponents by a total of 181 to 33. They won the PCC championship.

In the final AP poll released on December 9, 1939, USC was ranked No. 3 with 891 points, 200 points behind No 1 Texas A&M. However, in the Dickinson System rankings released three days later on December 12, USC was ranked No. 1 with a 25.73 point rating, edging out Texas A&M by three tenths of a point. The Trojans were awarded the Knute Rockne Memorial Trophy for the national championship as awarded by the Dickinson system.

After the final rankings were released, the Trojans defeated No. 2 Tennessee, 14–0, in the 1940 Rose Bowl. Tennessee had not given up any points prior to the Rose Bowl and had won 23 consecutive games. The AP did not conduct a poll after the bowl games.

USC guard Harry Smith was a consensus first-team pick on the 1939 All-America college football team. Smith was later inducted into the College Football Hall of Fame. Quarterback Grenny Lansdell was chosen as a first-team All-American by the Central Press Association and as a third-team All-American by the Associated Press. Smith, Lansdell, and tackle Phil Gaspar were also selected as first-team players on the 1939 All-Pacific Coast football team.

USC recognized the 1939 team as National Champions in 2004 based on their #1 ranking in the contemporary Dickinson System. USC saluted the surviving members of the squad on the field at their October 16 home game versus Arizona State. USC's yearbook for the 1939-1940 school year also referred to the team as "National Champions".

== Schedule ==
Date	Opponent	Rank	Site	Result	Attendance	Source
September 30	Oregon		Los Angeles Memorial Coliseum; Los Angeles, CA	T 7–7	41,000	
October 7	Washington State		Los Angeles Memorial Coliseum; Los Angeles, CA	W 27–0	45,000	
October 14	Illinois*		Los Angeles Memorial Coliseum; Los Angeles, CA	W 26–0	60,000	
October 28	California	No. 8	California Memorial Stadium; Berkeley, CA	W 26–0	46,000	
November 4	vs. No. 11 Oregon State	No. 7	Multnomah Stadium; Portland, OR	W 19–7	32,611	
November 11	Stanford	No. 4	Los Angeles Memorial Coliseum; Los Angeles, CA (rivalry)	W 33–0	50,000	
November 25	at No. 7 Notre Dame*	No. 4	Notre Dame Stadium; Notre Dame, IN (rivalry)	W 20–12	54,799	
December 2	Washington^{†}	No. 1	Los Angeles Memorial Coliseum; Los Angeles, CA	W 9–7	44,760	
December 9	at No. 9 UCLA	No. 3	Los Angeles Memorial Coliseum; Los Angeles, CA (Victory Bell)	T 0–0	103,303	
January 1, 1940	vs. No. 2 Tennessee*	No. 3	Rose Bowl; Pasadena, CA (Rose Bowl)	W 14–0	92,200	
*Non-conference game; ^{†}Homecoming; Rankings from AP Poll released prior to the game

== Rankings ==
Ranking movements Legend: ██ Increase in ranking ██ Decrease in ranking т = Tied with team above or below ( ) = First-place votes
	Week								
Poll	1	2	3	4	5	6	7	8	Final
AP	7	8	7 (1)	4 (5)	3 (10)	4 (11)	1т (25)	3 (18)	3 (9)

== 1940 NFL draft ==
The following players were drafted into professional football following the 1939 season.

Player	Position	Round	Pick	Franchise
Doyle Nave	Back	1	6	Detroit Lions
Grenny Lansdell	End	1	10	New York Giants
Bill Fisk	End	3	21	Detroit Lions
Harry Smith	Guard	5	36	Detroit Lions
Bobby Winslow	End	7	56	Detroit Lions
Bob Hoffman	Back	9	78	Washington Redskins
Howard Stoecker	Tackle	11	98	Washington Redskins
Phil Gaspar	Tackle	12	109	Green Bay Packers
