= Schuchardt =

Schuchart is a family name of:

- Brigitte Schuchardt (born 28 March 1955, in Jena), German swimmer
- Elliott J. Schuchardt, American civil liberties attorney
- Helga Schuchardt (born 1939), German politician
- Hugo Schuchardt (4 February 1842, Gotha (Thuringia) – 21 April 1927, Graz (Styria), German linguist
- Johann Christian Schuchardt (5 May 1799, Buttstädt - 10 August 1870, Weimar), German jurist, graphic artist, art historian and art critic.
- Tomasz Schuchardt (born 18 September 1986), Polish actor
