= Bill Fisk =

American football player and coach (1916–2007)

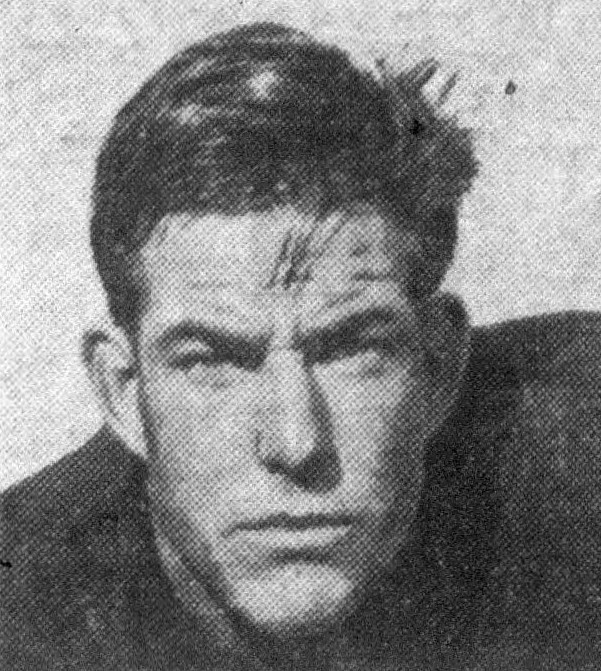

No. 10, 81, 80, 2, 56, 55
- Positions: End, defensive end

Personal information
- Born: November 5, 1916; Los Angeles, California, U.S.
- Died: March 28, 2007 (aged 90); Los Angeles, California, U.S.
- Listed height: 6 ft 0 in (1.83 m)
- Listed weight: 200 lb (91 kg)

Career information
- High school: Alhambra (Alhambra, California)
- College: USC
- NFL draft: 1940: 3rd round, 21st overall pick

Career history

Playing
- Detroit Lions (1940–1943); Los Angeles Bulldogs (1943); San Francisco 49ers (1946-1947); Los Angeles Dons (1948)

Coaching
- USC (1949–1956) Assistant coach

Awards and highlights
- Second-team All-PCC (1939)

Career NFL statistics
- Receptions: 69
- Receiving yards: 791
- Touchdowns: 3
- Stats at Pro Football Reference

William G. Fisk (November 5, 1916 – March 28, 2007) was an American professional football player and coach. He played professionally as an end and defensive end in the National Football League (NFL) and All-America Football Conference (AAFC) from 1940 to 1948.

== Early life ==
Born in Los Angeles, Fisk prepped at Alhambra High School and played college football at the University of Southern California (USC). He was a member of the Trojans 1938 Rose Bowl-winning team, and was voted Most Inspirational Player on the 1939 USC Trojans football team, which own a national championship. He was one of six Trojans selected for the 1940 College All-Star Game in Chicago.

== Professional football career ==
Fisk played for the NFL's Detroit Lions and the AAFC's San Francisco 49ers and Los Angeles Dons between 1940 and 1948. He was drafted in the third round of the 1940 NFL draft by Detroit.

== Coaching career ==
Fisk was an assistant coach of the USC Trojans between 1949 and 1956 under head coaches Jeff Cravath and Jess Hill.

== Later years and family ==
After coaching, Fisk worked in aerospace. His son, Bill Jr., was an offensive guard on USC's 1962 national championship team, and was named All-American in 1964. The younger Fisk served as head football coach of Mt. San Antonio College for a period of time.

Fisk died on March 28, 2007.
