= Vic Reginato =

American football player (1918–2000)

- Vic Reginato, 1936

Profile
- Position: End

Personal information
- Born: September 17, 1918; Klamath Falls, Oregon, U.S.
- Died: February 14, 2000 (aged 81); Rancho Mirage, California, U.S.

Career information
- College: Oregon

Awards and highlights
- Second-team All-PCC (1939)

Victor John Reginato (September 17, 1918 – February 14, 2000), later known as Victor John Regin, was an American football player.

Reginato was born in 1918 in Klamath Falls, Oregon, and attended Klammath Union High School. He played at the end position for the Oregon Ducks football team during the 1938 and 1939 seasons. He played on both offense and defense and also handled kicking for Oregon. He was also the president of Sigma Phi Epsilon fraternity at Oregon.

He was selected by the Chicago Cardinals in the sixth round (41st overall pick) of the 1940 NFL draft, but he opted not to play professional football.

Reginato married Marie Virginia Brace in 1940. After his football career ended, he spent 45 years working in finance for Gulf and Western Industries. He died in 2000 at Eisenhower Medical Center in Rancho Mirage, California.
