= Jack Sommers =

American football player (1917–1975)

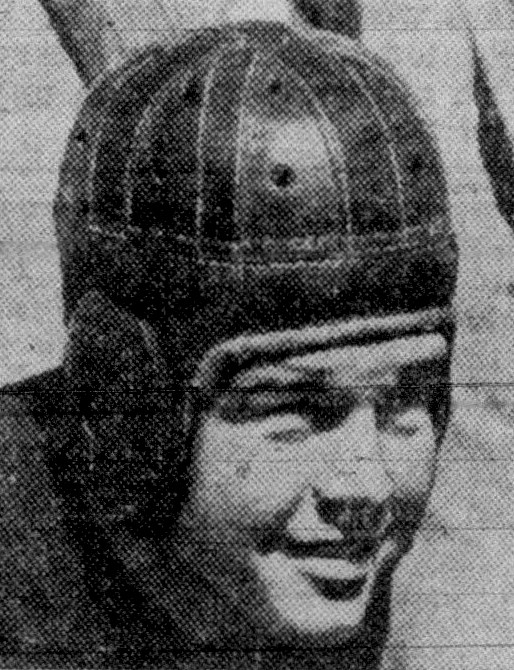
- Sommers, circa 1941

No. 46, 89, 36, 58, 11
- Position: Center

Personal information
- Born: February 9, 1919; Norristown, Pennsylvania, U.S.
- Died: September 2, 1975 (aged 56); Norristown, Pennsylvania, U.S.
- Listed height: 6 ft 3 in (1.91 m)
- Listed weight: 222 lb (101 kg)

Career information
- High school: Mercersburg Academy (Mercersburg, Pennsylvania)
- College: UCLA
- NFL draft: 1941: 11th round, 92nd overall pick

Career history
- Los Angeles Bulldogs (1941-1946); Washington Redskins (1947)

Awards and highlights
- Second-team All-PCC (1939)

Career NFL statistics
- Games played: 8
- Stats at Pro Football Reference

Jack William Sommers (February 9, 1917 – September 1975) was an American professional football player who was an offensive lineman in the National Football League (NFL) for the Washington Redskins. He played college football for the UCLA Bruins and was selected in the 11th round of the 1941 NFL draft by the Chicago Cardinals.
