= John Schiechl =

American football player (1917–1964)

No. 35, 52, 41, 24
- Position: Center

Personal information
- Born: August 27, 1917; San Francisco, California, U.S.
- Died: February 11, 1964 (aged 46); Dade County, Florida, U.S.
- Listed height: 6 ft 3 in (1.91 m)
- Listed weight: 244 lb (111 kg)

Career information
- High school: Balboa (San Francisco)
- College: Santa Clara (1936-1939)
- NFL draft: 1940: 2nd round, 13th overall pick

Career history
- Pittsburgh Steelers (1941); Detroit Lions (1942); Pittsburgh Steelers (1942); Chicago Bears (1945–1946); San Francisco 49ers (1947)

Awards and highlights
- NFL champion (1946); Consensus All-American (1939); 2× First-team All-PCC (1938, 1939)

Career NFL/AAFC statistics
- Games played: 49
- Games started: 27
- Interceptions: 6
- Stats at Pro Football Reference

John George Schiechl (August 22, 1917 – February 11, 1964) was an American professional football player who was a center in the National Football League (NFL) and the All-America Football Conference (AAFC). He played college football for the Santa Clara Broncos, earning consensus All-American honors in 1939. He was selected in the second round of the 1940 NFL draft. He played for the Pittsburgh Steelers, Detroit Lions, Chicago Bears and San Francisco 49ers.

Schiechl was born in San Francisco, California, where he attended Balboa High School before matriculating to Santa Clara University. He served in World War II for the United States Navy before rejoining the NFL in 1945.
