= 1939 Idaho Vandals football team =

American college football season

1939 Idaho Vandals football
- Conference: Pacific Coast Conference
- Record: 2–6 (0–3 PCC)
- Head coach: Ted Bank (5th season)
- Home stadium: Neale Stadium

1939 Pacific Coast Conference football standings
	Conf.					Overall
Team	W		L		T	W		L		T
No. 3 USC $	5	–	0	–	2	8	–	0	–	2
No. 7 UCLA	5	–	0	–	3	6	–	0	–	4
Oregon State	6	–	1	–	1	9	–	1	–	1
Washington	4	–	4	–	0	4	–	5	–	1
Oregon	3	–	3	–	1	3	–	4	–	1
Washington State	3	–	5	–	0	4	–	5	–	0
Montana	1	–	2	–	0	3	–	6	–	0
California	2	–	5	–	0	3	–	7	–	0
Stanford	0	–	6	–	1	1	–	7	–	1
Idaho	0	–	3	–	0	2	–	6	–	0
$ – Conference champion; Rankings from AP Poll

The 1939 Idaho Vandals football team represented the University of Idaho in the 1939 college football season. The Vandals were led by fifth-year head coach Ted Bank, and were members of the Pacific Coast Conference. Home games were played on campus in Moscow at Neale Stadium, with one game in Boise at Public School Field.

The Vandals were 2–6 overall and lost all three conference games. They did not play any of the four California teams, Washington or Oregon. In the Battle of the Palouse with neighbor Washington State, the Vandals suffered a twelfth straight loss, falling 21–13 at Rogers Field in Pullman on November 11. Idaho's most recent win in the series was a fourteen years earlier in 1925 and the next was fifteen years away in 1954.

Two weeks earlier, Idaho began a rare three-year losing streak to Montana in the Little Brown Stein rivalry with a 13-point shutout at homecoming in Moscow. While Montana was in the PCC (through 1949), the loser of the game was frequently last in the conference standings.

Idaho was ranked at No. 182 (out of 609 teams) in the final Litkenhous Ratings for 1939.

== Schedule ==
Date	Time	Opponent	Site	Result	Attendance	Source
September 30	2:00 pm	Montana State*	Neale Stadium; Moscow, ID	W 7–6		
October 7	2:00 pm	at Oregon State	Bell Field; Corvallis, OR	L 6–7		
October 13	2:00 pm	at Gonzaga*	Gonzaga Stadium; Spokane, WA (rivalry)	L 0–19		
October 21	1:00 pm	vs. Utah*	Public School Field; Boise, ID	L 0–35	6,500	
October 28	2:00 pm	Montana^{†}	Neale Stadium; Moscow, ID (Little Brown Stein)	L 0–13		
November 4	2:00 pm	Utah State*	Neale Stadium; Moscow, ID	W 19–7	2,500	
November 11	2:00 pm	at Washington State	Rogers Field; Pullman, WA (Battle of the Palouse)	L 13–21	12,000	
November 23	1:00 pm	at Denver*	DU Stadium; Denver, CO	L 0–23	14,000	
*Non-conference game; ^{†}Homecoming; All times are in Pacific time

== Coaching staff ==
- Bob Tessier, line
- Forrest Twogood
- Glenn Jacoby
- Walt Price, freshmen

== All-conference ==
No Vandals were named to the All-Coast team; honorable mention were ends Ray Smith and Emory Howard, guard Tony Kamelevicz, and center Tony Aschenbrenner.
