= Ambrose Schindler =

American football player, coach, and official (1917–2018)

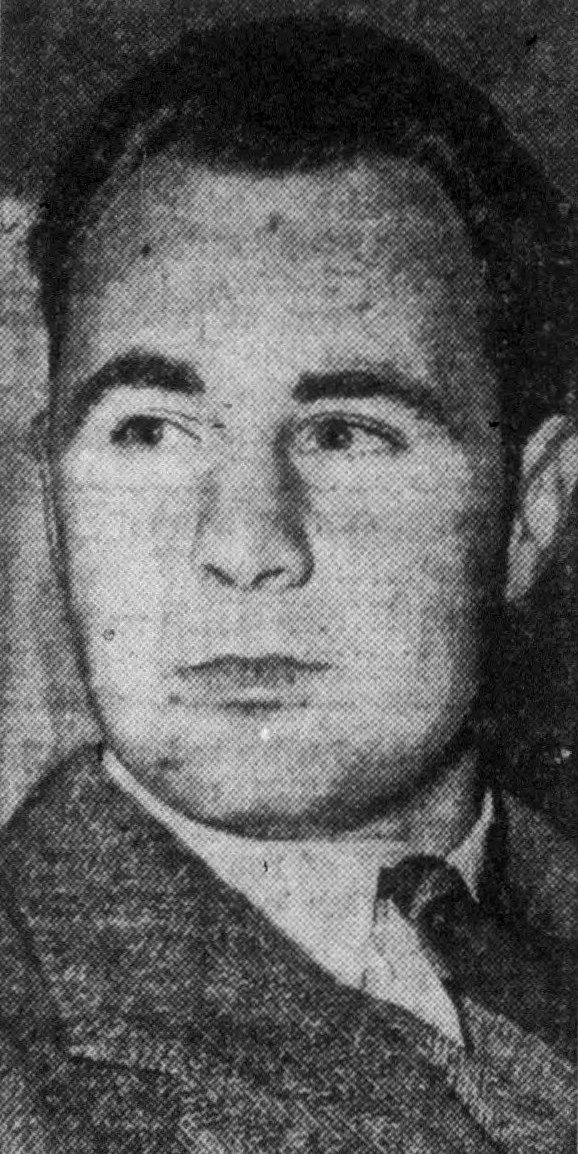
- Schindler, circa 1947

Profile
- Position: Quarterback

Personal information
- Born: April 21, 1917; Mission Hills, California, U.S.
- Died: December 30, 2018 (aged 101)

Career information
- College: USC
- NFL draft: 1940: 13th round, 119th overall pick

Career history
- Glendale HS (CA) (1946) Head coach; El Camino (1947–1951) Head coach

Awards and highlights
- 2× Second-team All-PCC (1937, 1939); Rose Bowl MVP (1940)

Ambrose "Amblin' Amby" Schindler (April 21, 1917 – December 30, 2018) was an American college football player, coach, and on-field official. He played football at the University of Southern California (USC). Schindler served as the head football coach at El Camino College in Alondra Park, California from 1947 to 1951.

== Sports career ==
Schindler prepped at San Diego High School. A star quarterback for the USC Trojans, during the 1937 season he led the team in rushing, scoring and total offense and was named to all-conference honors. His senior year, he led the Trojans to a share of the 1939 national championship: At the 1940 Rose Bowl, capping the 1939 season, Schindler ran for a touchdown and passed for another in a 14-0 victory over a Tennessee Volunteers team that had previously gone undefeated for 23 games and unscored upon for the previous 16 games (including the entire 1939 regular season); he was named the game's most valuable player. He went on to be the MVP in the 1940 College All-Star Game, held at Soldier Field in Chicago.

== Film and stunt work ==
During the end of his college career, he appeared in The Wizard of Oz (1939) as a Winkie guard and as Jack Haley's Tin Man stunt double. At the time of his death, Schindler was one of the last surviving living people working on the film classic, having outlived all major cast members, original Tin Man Buddy Ebsen, and adult Munchkins (Jerry Maren died several months before him). He also appeared in Sailor's Lady (1940).

== Later sport career and honours ==
Although selected by the Green Bay Packers in the 1940 NFL draft, Schindler did not play in the National Football League. At the time, coaching at high school and college offered more financial security than the low pay NFL of the early 1940s; he would later admit that he had lifelong doubts about his decision. His first offer out of college was to coach at Glendale High School, so chose it over a professional career. He served in the Navy during World War II and returned to move into a long career as coach and instructor at El Camino College in Torrance, California. In addition, Schindler also was a longtime football game official, working for years in the American Football League and later officiating high school and college games. He was inducted into the San Diego Hall of Champions Breitbard Hall of Fame in 1973. He was inducted into the USC Athletic Hall of Fame in 1997, and the Rose Bowl Hall of Fame in 2002.

== Personal life ==
Schindler was one of three children born to Charles Anthony Schindler (1880–1961) and Nellie Ethel Parks (1880–1957). Schindler married his wife, Lucille Frances West (1917–1984), on August 29, 1943, and they together had two children. He did occasionally think about what his life would have been like if he played professional football, but part of his decision to select a more, at the time, stable career was because of his wife. His descendants noted that Schindler had suffered several concussions during his college career and that his short-term memory during his 90s had deteriorated rapidly compared to his sister's at a similar age; thus not going professional as a football player may have spared him from worse chronic traumatic encephalopathy. Schindler loved surfing and bicycling and was an active surfer until age 75. He drove a Jaguar with a vanity license plate reading "X USC QB." He turned 100 in April 2017 and died in December 2018 of undisclosed causes at the age of 101.

== Head coaching record ==
=== Junior college ===
Year	Team	Overall	Conference	Standing	Bowl/playoffs
El Camino Warriors (Metropolitan Conference) (1947–1951)
1947	El Camino	7–2–1	1–2–1	T–3rd	
1948	El Camino	3–7	0–4	5th	
1949	El Camino	7–3	3–2	3rd	
1950	El Camino	8–1–1	5–1	1st	
1951	El Camino	1–9	1–5	T–5th	
El Camino:		26–22–2	10–14–1		
Total:		26–22–2			
National championship Conference title Conference division title or championship game berth

== See also ==
- List of American Football League officials
