= Kenny Washington (American football) =

American football player (1918–1971)

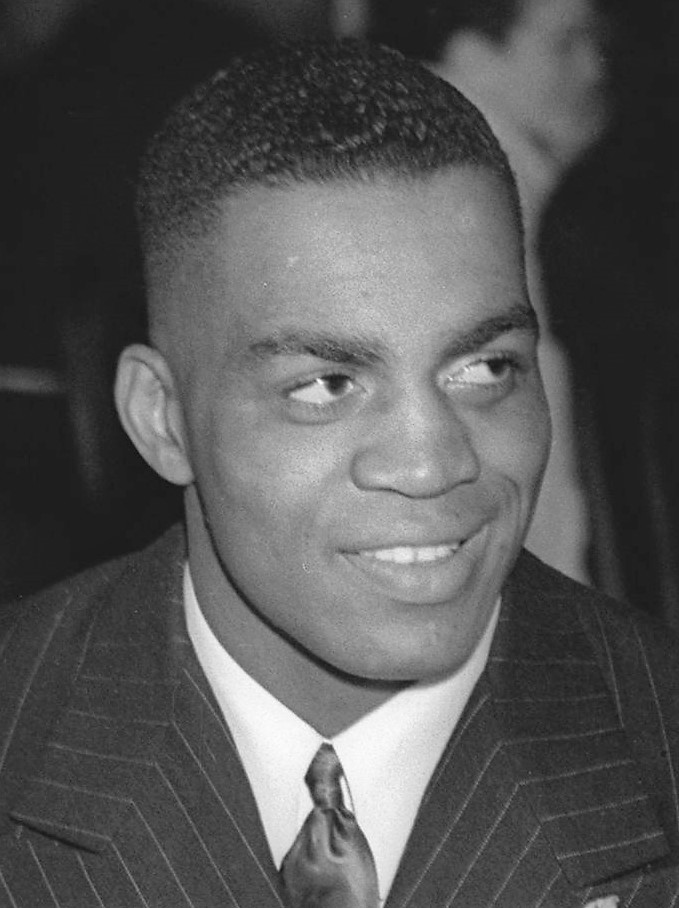
- Washington in 1938

No. 13
- Position: Running back

Personal information
- Born: August 31, 1918; Los Angeles, California, U.S.
- Died: June 24, 1971 (aged 52); Los Angeles, California, U.S.
- Listed height: 6 ft 1 in (1.85 m)
- Listed weight: 212 lb (96 kg)

Career information
- High school: Abraham Lincoln (Los Angeles)
- College: UCLA
- NFL draft: 1940: undrafted

Career history
- Hollywood Bears (1940-1941); San Francisco Clippers (1944); Hollywood Bears (1945); Los Angeles Rams (1946–1948); Los Angeles Angels (1950)

Awards and highlights
- 2× All-PCFL (1941, 1945); All-AFL (1944); Second-team All-American (1939); 2× First-team All-PCC (1938, 1939); Second-team All-PCC (1937); UCLA Bruins No. 13 retired

Career NFL statistics
- Rushing yards: 859
- Rushing average: 6.1
- Receptions: 15
- Receiving yards: 227
- Total touchdowns: 9
- Stats at Pro Football Reference
- College Football Hall of Fame

Kenneth Stanley Washington (August 31, 1918 – June 24, 1971) was an American professional football player who was the first African-American to sign a contract with a National Football League (NFL) team in the modern (post-World War II) era. He played college football for the UCLA Bruins.

== Early life ==
Kenneth Stanley Washington was born in Los Angeles and grew up in the city's Lincoln Heights neighborhood. His parents, Marian Lenàn and Negro league baseball player Edgar "Blue" Washington, separated when he was two years old. Kenny Washington was raised by his grandmother Susie Washington, his uncle Rocky, the first black uniformed lieutenant in the Los Angeles Police Department (LAPD), and his aunt-in-law Hazel. Washington was a star in both baseball and football at Abraham Lincoln High School, where he was nicknamed "Kingfish" after a character in the radio show Amos 'n' Andy. He led both teams to city championships in the same calendar year.

== College career ==
Washington attended the University of California, Los Angeles (UCLA), where he was a member of both the Bruins' baseball and football teams. As a baseball player, Washington was rated better than his teammate Jackie Robinson. One story has it that Brooklyn Dodgers manager Leo Durocher wanted to offer Washington a contract to play for the team, but only if he went to Puerto Rico first, which Washington refused to do.

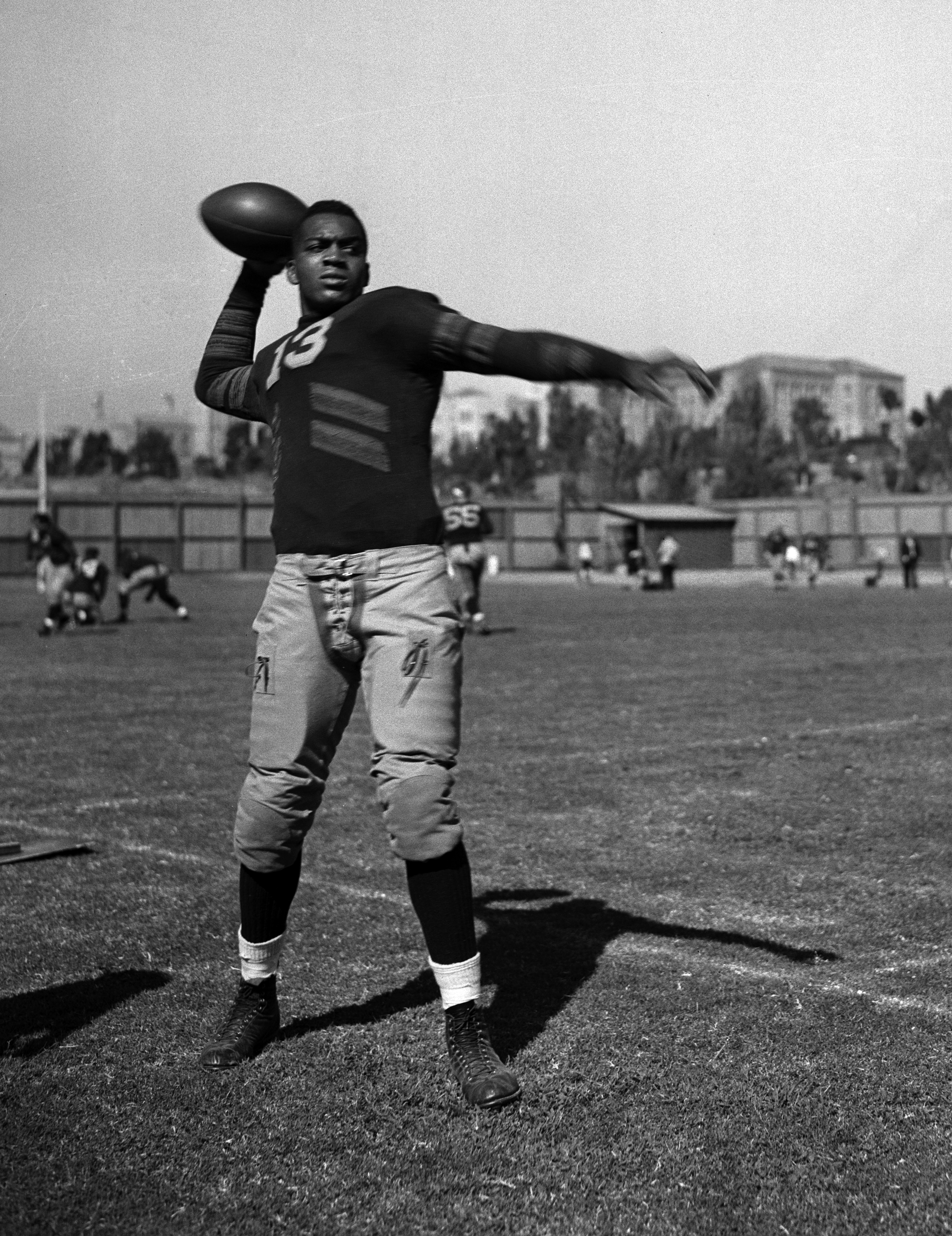
Washington during his time at UCLA

In football, his position was tailback, and he often passed as much as he rushed. Washington rushed for 1,914 yards in his college career, a school record for 34 years. He was one of five African American players on the 1939 UCLA Bruins football team, the others being Woody Strode, Robinson, Johnny Wynne, and Ray Bartlett. Washington, Strode, and Robinson made up three of the four backfield players that year. This was a rarity to have so many African Americans when only a few dozen at all played on college football teams. The Bruins played eventual conference and national champion USC to a 0–0 tie with the 1940 Rose Bowl on the line. It was the first UCLA–USC rivalry football game with national implications. UCLA teammates have commented how strong Washington was when confronted with racial slurs and discrimination.

Washington was the first Bruin to lead the nation in total offense and became the first consensus All-American in the history of the school's football program in 1939. Despite these achievements and the fact that he also doubled as a defensive back, he was named to second-team All-America selection instead of the first and was omitted from the East–West Shrine Game that year. These slights were the source of much outrage among media outlets which blamed them on racial discrimination.

According to Time magazine's coverage of the 1940 College All-Star Game, Washington was "considered by West Coast fans the most brilliant player in the US last year." He starred in the 1940 film While Thousands Cheer.

== Professional football ==
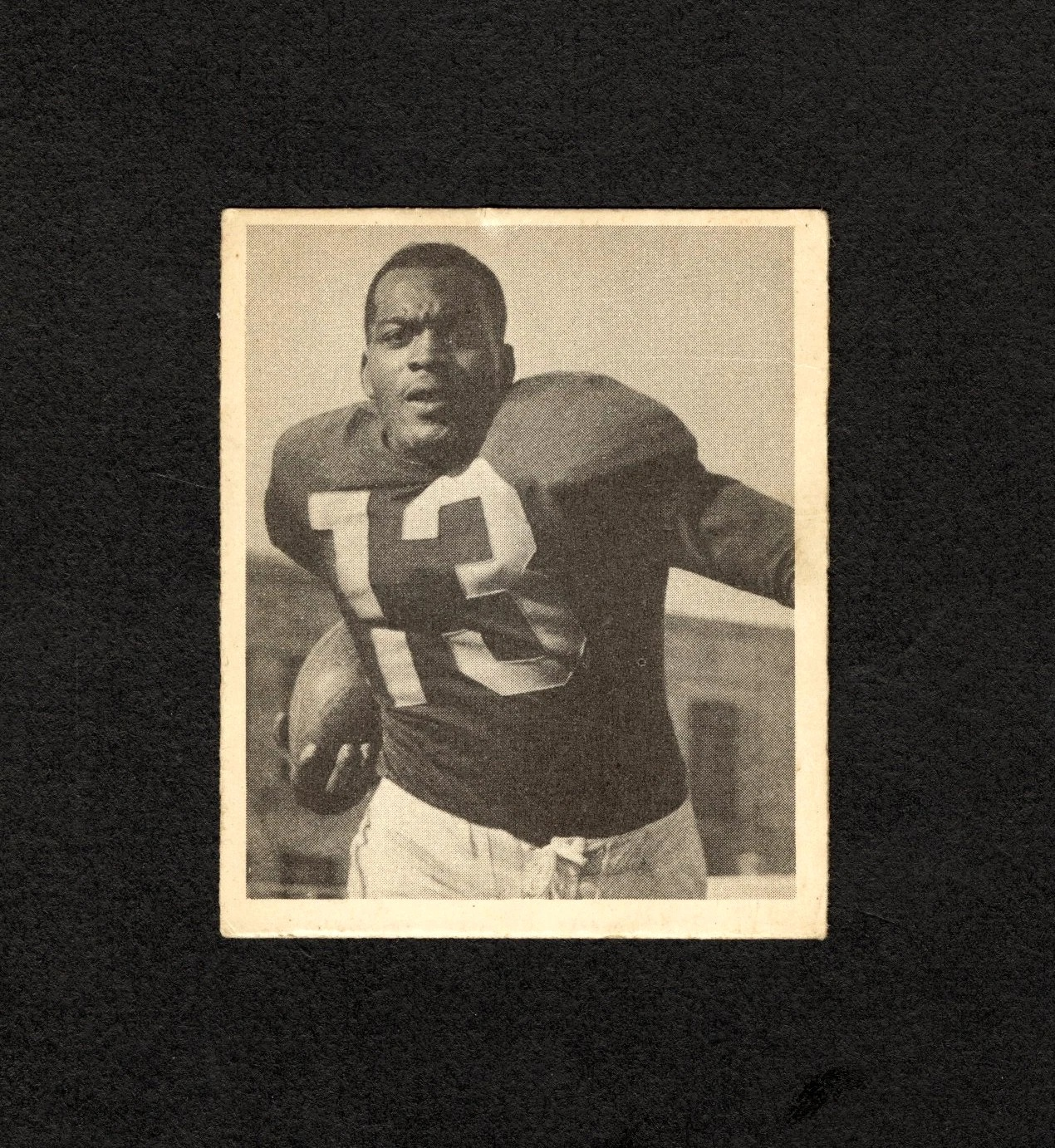
Kenny Washington 1948 Bowman rookie card

After graduation, George Halas, who coached the College All-Star Game, indicated interest in Washington for his Chicago Bears team, but was unable to convince the league to permit integration. Instead, Washington coached football at UCLA and joined the LAPD. From 1940 to 1945, Washington played for the Hollywood Bears of the Pacific Coast Professional Football League, where he was the league's highest-paid player. He earned all-league recognition each year, including his first year when he suffered a knee injury that prevented him from being conscripted for the war. Ezzrett Anderson and Washington's UCLA teammate Strode were also on that team. In 1945, he did serve in the military on the USO tour as a type of sports ambassador, visiting with troops and playing in exhibition games.

When the Cleveland Rams moved to Los Angeles, the team sought to play in the publicly owned Los Angeles Memorial Coliseum – a decision which created immediate pressure that the team be racially integrated, since black taxpayers as well as white had paid for construction of the facility. The terms of the Coliseum's lease would end up being a determining factor in signing of Washington and the re-integration of the NFL. The Rams backfield coach Bob Snyder would later state that “I doubt we would have been interested in Washington had we stayed in Cleveland.”

The Los Angeles Tribune was especially outspoken in its push for the Rams to sign Washington, thanks to its African-American sports editor, William Claire "Halley" Harding, a former professional athlete and member of the debate team at Wiley College. As a result, the team signed Washington on March 21, 1946, followed by Strode on May 7. Following Washington's signing, parallels were drawn to Jackie Robinson's debut with the Brooklyn Dodgers by some in the media.

While the signings of Washington and Strode are notable as they marked the re-entry of African-Americans into the NFL, both of these players had already passed their athletic peaks (Strode was 31). At age 27, prior to his first NFL season Washington underwent surgery in both knees (his fifth knee surgery overall – as a child he contracted rickets and was once hit by a car), having torn cartilage removed from his left knee and what was characterized in the press as "a growth" from his right. Washington would play for the Rams for three seasons despite his injuries, producing a productive tenure with the team. Washington was the league leader in yards per carry in his second season, and even scored a 92-yard touchdown, which remains the Rams team record for the longest run from scrimmage. While his career in the NFL did not reach the statistical heights of his college career, his entry into the league is still of great importance due to the precedent it set of allowing African Americans into the modern NFL. When he retired in 1948, 80,000 people attended his final game and the entire stadium gave him a standing ovation.

== Later life ==
Washington was a Republican in his younger years and strongly supported Richard Nixon's 1950 U.S. Senate campaign. The night before Nixon's victory over Congresswoman Helen Gahagan Douglas, the candidate – a great football fan – spent the evening at Washington's south Los Angeles home playing music and trying to relax. However, in the 1960 presidential election, Washington voted for John F. Kennedy instead of Nixon and tended to vote for Democrats for the rest of his life, but he never declared a political party affiliation.

After retirement from football, Washington returned to the LAPD. He also worked for a grocery store chain and a whiskey distributor, and was a part-time scout for the Los Angeles Dodgers, where his son Kenny Jr. played. Thanks to his connections from when he had worked at movie studios during his undergraduate years, he was also chosen for a few film roles, including Rope of Sand (1949), Pinky (1949), and The Jackie Robinson Story (1950).

== Death ==
Washington died of heart and lung problems at the age of 52 in Los Angeles, California. He is buried in Evergreen Cemetery.

== Legacy ==
For his contribution to sports in Los Angeles, Washington was honored with a Los Angeles Memorial Coliseum "Court of Honor" plaque by the Coliseum commissioners. He was inducted to the College Football Hall of Fame in 1956 and his number 13 jersey was the first to be retired at UCLA. He was posthumously inducted into the UCLA Athletics Hall of Fame. His alma mater Abraham Lincoln High School has annually awarded the Kenny Washington Trophy to the school's best football player since 1949.

One legacy of Washington's and Strode's experience in the NFL – paralleled in 1946 by racial trailblazers Marion Motley and Bill Willis in the rival All-America Football Conference – was that Branch Rickey, president of the Brooklyn Dodgers, saw that blacks and whites could coexist in a violent sport without much disruption, and decided that Major League Baseball could be integrated as well. He signed Washington's and Strode's UCLA teammate Jackie Robinson to the Dodgers in 1947.

However, for many years, Washington was ignored by the NFL and the story of professional football's postwar integration received little attention. One reason is because for most of the 20th century, baseball was by far the top sport in the U.S., and another was that his NFL career was a short three years. Neither Washington nor Strode has been inducted to the Pro Football Hall of Fame, although both Marion Motley and Bill Willis of the AAFC's and NFL's Cleveland Browns have received that honor. Lincoln High School renamed their stadium after Washington, and every year since 2011 holds a memorial football game on the anniversary of Washington's death.

== See also ==
- List of NCAA major college football yearly total offense leaders

== Sources ==
- Atwood, Gretchen (September 6, 2016). Lost Champions: Four Men, Two Teams, and the Breaking of Pro Football's Color Line. New York: Bloomsbury USA. ISBN 9781620406007. OCLC 956379043.
