= Al Krueger =

American football player (1919–1999)

- Krueger in 1946

No. 14, 52, 47, 62
- Positions: Halfback, End

Personal information
- Born: April 3, 1919; Orange, California, U.S.
- Died: February 20, 1999 (aged 79); Lancaster, California, U.S.
- Listed height: 6 ft 0 in (1.83 m)
- Listed weight: 190 lb (86 kg)

Career information
- High school: Antelope Valley (Lancaster)
- College: USC (1937-1940)
- NFL draft: 1941: 7th round, 60th overall pick

Career history
- Washington Redskins (1941–1942); Los Angeles Bulldogs (1945); Los Angeles Dons (1946)

Awards and highlights
- NFL champion (1942); Pro Bowl (1942); 2× Second-team All-PCC (1939, 1940); Rose Bowl MVP, 1939; Rose Bowl Hall of Fame, 1995

Career NFL + AAFC statistics
- Receptions: 35
- Receiving yards: 401
- Touchdowns: 2
- Stats at Pro Football Reference

Alvin John "Antelope Al" Krueger (April 3, 1919 – February 20, 1999) was an American football end in the National Football League (NFL) for the Washington Redskins. He also played in the All-America Football Conference (AAFC) for the Los Angeles Dons. He played college football at the University of Southern California.

Krueger received the winning touchdown pass from quarterback Doyle Nave over a no-scoring Duke team in the 1939 Rose Bowl. He and Nave were named Co-MVP for that game and were later inducted into the Rose Bowl Hall of Fame. He was selected in the seventh round of the 1941 NFL draft by Washington.
