= 1939 Washington State Cougars football team =

American college football season

1939 Washington State Cougars football
- Conference: Pacific Coast Conference
- Record: 4–5 (3–5 PCC)
- Head coach: Babe Hollingbery (14th season)
- Captain: Dick Emerson
- Home stadium: Rogers Field

1939 Pacific Coast Conference football standings
	Conf.					Overall
Team	W		L		T	W		L		T
No. 3 USC $	5	–	0	–	2	8	–	0	–	2
No. 7 UCLA	5	–	0	–	3	6	–	0	–	4
Oregon State	6	–	1	–	1	9	–	1	–	1
Washington	4	–	4	–	0	4	–	5	–	1
Oregon	3	–	3	–	1	3	–	4	–	1
Washington State	3	–	5	–	0	4	–	5	–	0
Montana	1	–	2	–	0	3	–	6	–	0
California	2	–	5	–	0	3	–	7	–	0
Stanford	0	–	6	–	1	1	–	7	–	1
Idaho	0	–	3	–	0	2	–	6	–	0
$ – Conference champion; Rankings from AP Poll

The 1939 Washington State Cougars football team was an American football team that represented Washington State College in the Pacific Coast Conference (PCC) during the 1939 college football season. Fourteenth-year head coach Babe Hollingbery led the team to a 4–5 record (3–5 in PCC, sixth); they were outscored 138 to 67, held scoreless three times, and recorded two shutouts. The Cougars' three home games were played on campus at Rogers Field in Pullman. Washington State was ranked at No. 117 (out of 609 teams) in the final Litkenhous Ratings for 1939.

Longtime assistant coach Karl Schlademan moved on to Michigan State after this season.

== Schedule ==
Date	Opponent	Site	Result	Attendance	Source
September 23	Gonzaga*	Rogers Field; Pullman, WA	W 19–6	9,000	
October 7	at USC	Los Angeles Memorial Coliseum; Los Angeles, CA	L 0–27	45,000	
October 14	Washington	Rogers Field; Pullman, WA (rivalry)	W 6–0	18,000	
October 21	at California	California Memorial Stadium; Berkeley, CA	L 7–13	25,000	
October 28	at No. 15 Oregon State	Bell Field; Corvallis, OR	L 0–13	8,000	
November 4	at Oregon	Hayward Field; Eugene, OR	L 0–38	4,500	
November 11	Idaho	Rogers Field; Pullman, WA (rivalry)	W 21–13	12,000	
November 18	at Stanford	Stanford Stadium; Stanford, CA	W 7–0	10,000	
November 30	at No. 13 UCLA	Los Angeles Memorial Coliseum; Los Angeles, CA	L 7–24	25,000	
*Non-conference game; Rankings from AP Poll released prior to the game; Source:
