= 1939 California Golden Bears football team =

American college football season

1939 California Golden Bears football
- Conference: Pacific Coast Conference
- Record: 3–7 (2–5 PCC)
- Head coach: Stub Allison (5th season)
- Home stadium: California Memorial Stadium

1939 Pacific Coast Conference football standings
	Conf.					Overall
Team	W		L		T	W		L		T
No. 3 USC $	5	–	0	–	2	8	–	0	–	2
No. 7 UCLA	5	–	0	–	3	6	–	0	–	4
Oregon State	6	–	1	–	1	9	–	1	–	1
Washington	4	–	4	–	0	4	–	5	–	1
Oregon	3	–	3	–	1	3	–	4	–	1
Washington State	3	–	5	–	0	4	–	5	–	0
Montana	1	–	2	–	0	3	–	6	–	0
California	2	–	5	–	0	3	–	7	–	0
Stanford	0	–	6	–	1	1	–	7	–	1
Idaho	0	–	3	–	0	2	–	6	–	0
$ – Conference champion; Rankings from AP Poll

The 1939 California Golden Bears football team was an American football team that represented the University of California, Berkeley during the 1939 college football season. Under head coach Stub Allison, the team compiled an overall record of 3–7 and 2–5 in conference.

California was ranked at No. 104 (out of 609 teams) in the final Litkenhous Ratings for 1939.

== Schedule ==
Date	Opponent	Site	Result	Attendance	Source
September 30	Cal Aggies*	California Memorial Stadium; Berkeley, CA	W 32–14	20,000	
September 30	Pacific (CA)*	California Memorial Stadium; Berkeley, CA	L 0–6	20,000	
October 7	Saint Mary's*	California Memorial Stadium; Berkeley, CA	L 3–7		
October 14	Oregon	California Memorial Stadium; Berkeley, CA	L 0–6	40,000	
October 21	Washington State	California Memorial Stadium; Berkeley, CA	W 13–7	25,000	
October 28	No. 8 USC	California Memorial Stadium; Berkeley, CA	L 0–26	46,000	
November 4	at No. 19 UCLA	Los Angeles Memorial Coliseum; Los Angeles, CA (rivalry)	L 7–20	55,000	
November 11	Washington	California Memorial Stadium; Berkeley, CA	L 6–13	25,000	
November 18	at No. 19 Oregon State	Bell Field; Corvallis, OR	L 0–21	9,500	
November 25	at Stanford	Stanford Stadium; Stanford, CA (Big Game)	W 32–14	60,000	
*Non-conference game; Rankings from AP Poll released prior to the game; Source:
