= Doyle Nave =

American football player and coach (1915–1990)

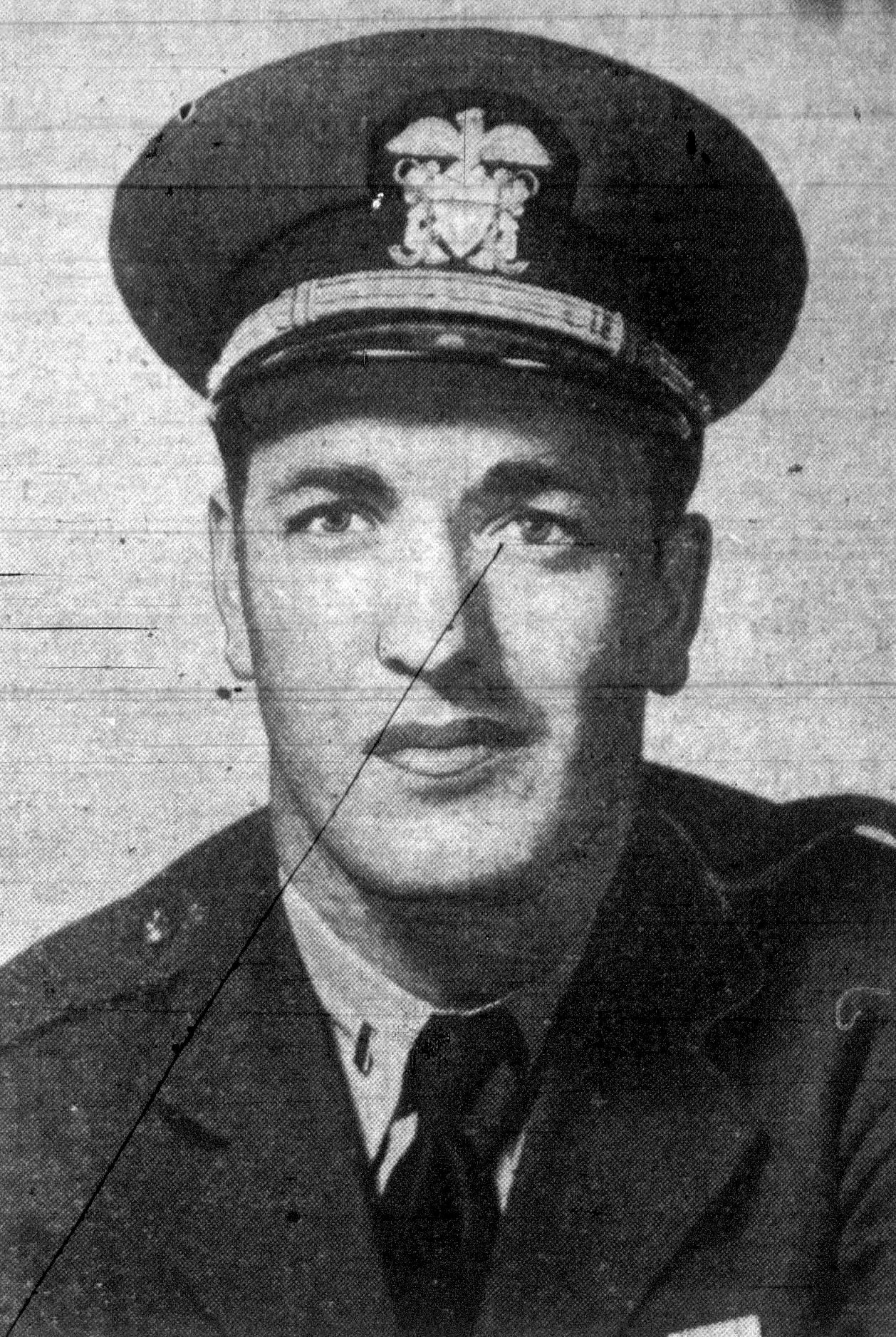
- Nave, circa 1943

No. 17
- Position: Quarterback

Personal information
- Born: July 12, 1915; Bedford County, Pennsylvania, U.S.
- Died: December 10, 1990 (aged 75); Los Angeles County, California, U.S.
- Listed height: 5 ft 11 in (1.80 m)
- Listed weight: 174 lb (79 kg)

Career information
- High school: Manual Arts (CA); Black-Foxe Military Institute (CA)
- College: USC
- NFL draft: 1940: 1st round, 6th overall pick

Career history

Playing
- USC Trojans (1936–1939); Detroit Lions (1940)*; Hawaii Polar Bears (1940s); Hollywood Bears (1940)
- * Offseason or practice squad member only

Coaching
- Hawaii Polar Bears (1940s)

Samuel Doyle Nave (July 12, 1915 – December 10, 1990) was an American football player and coach. He was known for coming off the bench and throwing the game-winning touchdown in the 1939 Rose Bowl. He was drafted 6th overall by the Detroit Lions but did not play for them. Afterwards he was the head coach of the Hawaii Polar Bears, a minor-league team.

== Early life ==
Doyle Nave was born on July 12, 1915, in Bedford County, Pennsylvania.

== College career ==
Nave went to college at USC. He played on their freshmen team in 1936. From 1937 to 1939, he was one of their backup quarterbacks.

=== 1939 Rose Bowl ===
In the 1939 Rose Bowl, he came off the bench with little time left and threw 4 straight completed passes to tight end Al Krueger. His fourth pass was completed for a touchdown with seconds remaining to beat the Duke Blue Devils 7–3. It was the only points Duke allowed all season. Nave and Krueger were named MVPs and later were inducted into the Rose Bowl Hall of Fame.

He later pursued track and high jumping.

== Professional career ==
=== Detroit Lions ===
In 1940 Nave was drafted sixth overall by the Detroit Lions but he did not play for them.

=== Hollywood Bears and Hawaii Polar Bears ===
After being drafted by the Lions, he became the Head Coach of the Hawaii Polar Bears, a minor league team. He played for them and also played shortly with the Hollywood Bears.

== Death ==
Nave died on December 10, 1990, at the age of 75.
