= 1939 Montana Grizzlies football team =

American college football season

1939 Montana Grizzlies football
- Conference: Pacific Coast Conference
- Record: 3–6 (1–2 PCC)
- Head coach: Doug Fessenden (5th season)
- Home stadium: Dornblaser Field

1939 Pacific Coast Conference football standings
	Conf.					Overall
Team	W		L		T	W		L		T
No. 3 USC $	5	–	0	–	2	8	–	0	–	2
No. 7 UCLA	5	–	0	–	3	6	–	0	–	4
Oregon State	6	–	1	–	1	9	–	1	–	1
Washington	4	–	4	–	0	4	–	5	–	1
Oregon	3	–	3	–	1	3	–	4	–	1
Washington State	3	–	5	–	0	4	–	5	–	0
Montana	1	–	2	–	0	3	–	6	–	0
California	2	–	5	–	0	3	–	7	–	0
Stanford	0	–	6	–	1	1	–	7	–	1
Idaho	0	–	3	–	0	2	–	6	–	0
$ – Conference champion; Rankings from AP Poll

The 1939 Montana Grizzlies football team represented the University of Montana in the 1939 college football season as a member of the Pacific Coast Conference (PCC). The Grizzlies were led by fifth-year head coach Doug Fessenden, played their home games at Dornblaser Field and finished the season with a record of five wins, three losses and one tie (3–6, 1–2 PCC).

Montana was ranked at No. 144 (out of 609 teams) in the final Litkenhous Ratings for 1939.

== Schedule ==
Date	Opponent	Site	Result	Attendance	Source
September 30	at Portland*	Multnomah Stadium; Portland, OR	W 9–0	4,500	
October 7	San Francisco*	Dornblaser Field; Missoula, MT	L 7–12		
October 14	vs. Montana State*	Butte High Stadium; Butte, MT (rivalry)	W 6–0	8,500	
October 21	at UCLA	Los Angeles Memorial Coliseum; Los Angeles, CA	L 6–20	25,000	
October 28	at Idaho	Neale Stadium; Moscow, ID (Little Brown Stein)	W 13–0		
November 4	at Washington	Husky Stadium; Seattle, WA	L 0–9	16,000	
November 11	Gonzaga*	Dornblaser Field; Missoula, MT	L 0–23		
November 25	at Texas Tech*	Tech Field; Lubbock, TX	L 0–13	3,000	
November 30	at Arizona*	Arizona Stadium; Tucson, AZ	L 0–6	9,000	
*Non-conference game; Source:
