= 1939 Stanford Indians football team =

American college football season

1939 Stanford Indians football
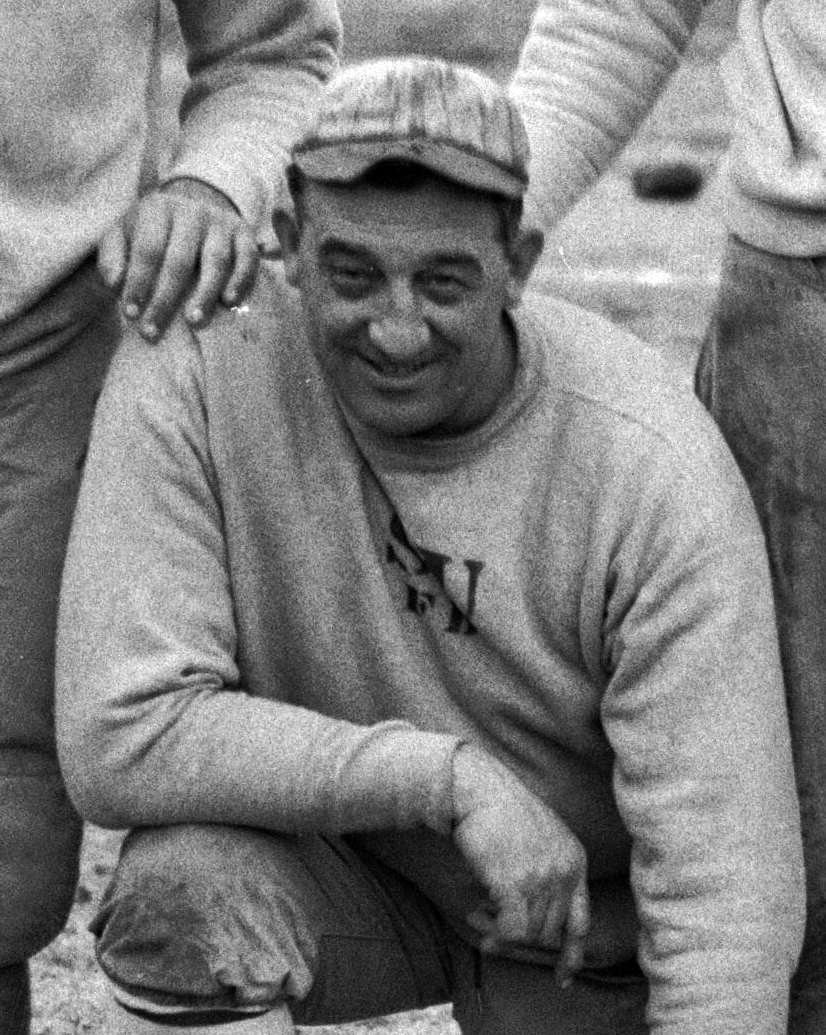
- Head coach Tiny Thornhill
- Conference: Pacific Coast Conference
- Record: 1–7–1 (0–6 PCC)
- Head coach: Tiny Thornhill (7th season)
- Offensive scheme: Single-wing
- Captain: Stan Andersen
- Home stadium: Stanford Stadium

1939 Pacific Coast Conference football standings
| | Conf. | | | | | Overall |
| Team | W | | L | | T | W | | L | | T |
|---|---|---|---|---|---|---|---|---|---|---|
| No. 3 USC $ | 5 | – | 0 | – | 2 | 8 | – | 0 | – | 2 |
| No. 7 UCLA | 5 | – | 0 | – | 3 | 6 | – | 0 | – | 4 |
| Oregon State | 6 | – | 1 | – | 1 | 9 | – | 1 | – | 1 |
| Washington | 4 | – | 4 | – | 0 | 4 | – | 5 | – | 1 |
| Oregon | 3 | – | 3 | – | 1 | 3 | – | 4 | – | 1 |
| Washington State | 3 | – | 5 | – | 0 | 4 | – | 5 | – | 0 |
| Montana | 1 | – | 2 | – | 0 | 3 | – | 6 | – | 0 |
| California | 2 | – | 5 | – | 0 | 3 | – | 7 | – | 0 |
| Stanford | 0 | – | 6 | – | 1 | 1 | – | 7 | – | 1 |
| Idaho | 0 | – | 3 | – | 0 | 2 | – | 6 | – | 0 |
$ – Conference champion; Rankings from AP Poll

The 1939 Stanford Indians football team represented Stanford University as a member of the Pacific Coast Conference (PCC) during the 1939 college football season. Seventh-year head coach Tiny Thornhill led the team to a 1–7–1 record, which ultimately contributed to his relief at the end of the season. He was replaced by Clark Shaughnessy, who surprised critics by leading the following year's team, largely made up of the same players, to the Rose Bowl. Shaughnessy noted that the players were not suited to the single-wing offense that Thornhill had employed.

Stanford was ranked at No. 111 (out of 609 teams) in the final Litkenhous Ratings for 1939.

Before the season, the Stanford Board of Athletic Control retained Thornhill as head coach, despite opposition from some of the alumni base. The Indians finished last in the Pacific Coast Conference with a 0–6–1 record against league opponents. It was the first time in history that Stanford failed to win a single Pacific Coast Conference game in a season. Contemporary sources called the 1939 squad the worst football team to represent Stanford University in the history of the program.

Stanford's only victory came in the season finale against Dartmouth at the Polo Grounds in New York City. At halftime, Stanford trailed 3–0, and Thornhill and his assistants, at a loss for words, asked former "Vow Boys" halfback Bob "Bones" Hamilton to deliver a halftime pep talk. Hamilton told the downtrodden players, "You are by far and large the worst group of players who have ever worn the Stanford red." The insult motivated the team to score 14 unanswered points for their only win of the season.

After the game, the United Press wrote, "Stanford, the worst team the West Coast has produced in years, pulled the day's gridiron surprise by walloping the strong Dartmouth eleven."

== Schedule ==
| Date | Opponent | Site | Result | Attendance | Source |
|---|---|---|---|---|---|
| September 30 | Oregon State | Stanford Stadium; Stanford, CA | L 0–12 | 20,000 | |
| October 7 | vs. Oregon | Multnomah Stadium; Portland, OR | L 0–10 | 20,000 | |
| October 14 | UCLA | Stanford Stadium; Stanford, CA | T 14–14 | 18,000 | |
| October 28 | at Washington | Husky Stadium; Seattle, WA | L 5–8 | 20,000 | |
| November 4 | Santa Clara* | Stanford Stadium; Stanford, CA | L 7–27 | 40,000 | |
| November 11 | at USC | Los Angeles Memorial Coliseum; Los Angeles, CA (rivalry) | L 0–33 | 50,000 | |
| November 18 | Washington State | Stanford Stadium; Stanford, CA | L 0–7 | 10,000 | |
| November 25 | California | Stanford Stadium; Stanford, CA (Big Game) | L 14–32 | 60,000 | |
| December 2 | vs. Dartmouth* | Polo Grounds; New York, NY | W 14–3 | 10,603 | |
*Non-conference game; Source:

== Players drafted by the NFL ==
| Player | Position | Round | Pick | NFL club |
| Hamp Pool | End | 9 | 77 | Chicago Bears |
| Stan Andersen | Tackle | 12 | 101 | Chicago Cardinals |
