= Chicago Charities College All-Star Game =

American football matchup

- College All-Star Football Classic
- Program cover for debut 1934 game
- Stadium: Soldier Field (1934–1942, 1945–1976); Dyche Stadium (1943–1944)
- Location: Chicago (1934–1942, 1945–1976); Evanston, Illinois (1943–1944)
- Operated: 1934–1976

Sponsors
- Chicago Tribune

The Chicago Charities College All-Star Game was a preseason American football game played from 1934 to 1976 between the National Football League (NFL) champions and a team of star college seniors from the previous year. It was also known as the College All-Star Football Classic.

The game was contested annually—except for 1974, due to that year's NFL strike—and was played in July, August, or September. In the 42 College All-Star Games, the defending pro champions won 31, the All-Stars won nine, and two were ties, giving the collegians a .238 winning percentage.

The second game, played in 1935, involved the hometown Chicago Bears, runner-up of the 1934 season, instead of the defending champion New York Giants. The New York Jets played in the 1969 edition, although still an American Football League (AFL) team. Once the AFL–NFL Championship was introduced (including for the two seasons before the "Super Bowl" designation was officially adopted and the remaining two seasons before the AFL–NFL merger) the Super Bowl winner was the professional team involved, regardless of which league the team represented.

== History of the game ==
=== Origins ===
The game was the idea of Arch Ward, the sports editor of the Chicago Tribune and the driving force behind Major League Baseball's All-Star Game. The game originally was a benefit for Chicago-area charities and was played at Soldier Field except for two years during World War II, in 1943 and 1944, when it was held at Northwestern University's Dyche Stadium in Evanston. Since Dyche Stadium was smaller than Soldier Field, the wartime federal government ordered the venue switch to reduce attendance and by extension the use of fuel and tires for travel.

The Chicago game was one of several "pro vs. rookie" college all-star games held across the United States in its early years (the 1939 season featured seven such games, all of which the NFL teams won in shutouts, and the season prior featured eight, with some of the collegiate players playing in multiple games).

Chicago's game had the benefit of being the highest profile, with the NFL champions facing the best college graduates from across the country as opposed to the regional games that were held elsewhere; because of this, the game survived far longer than its contemporaries.

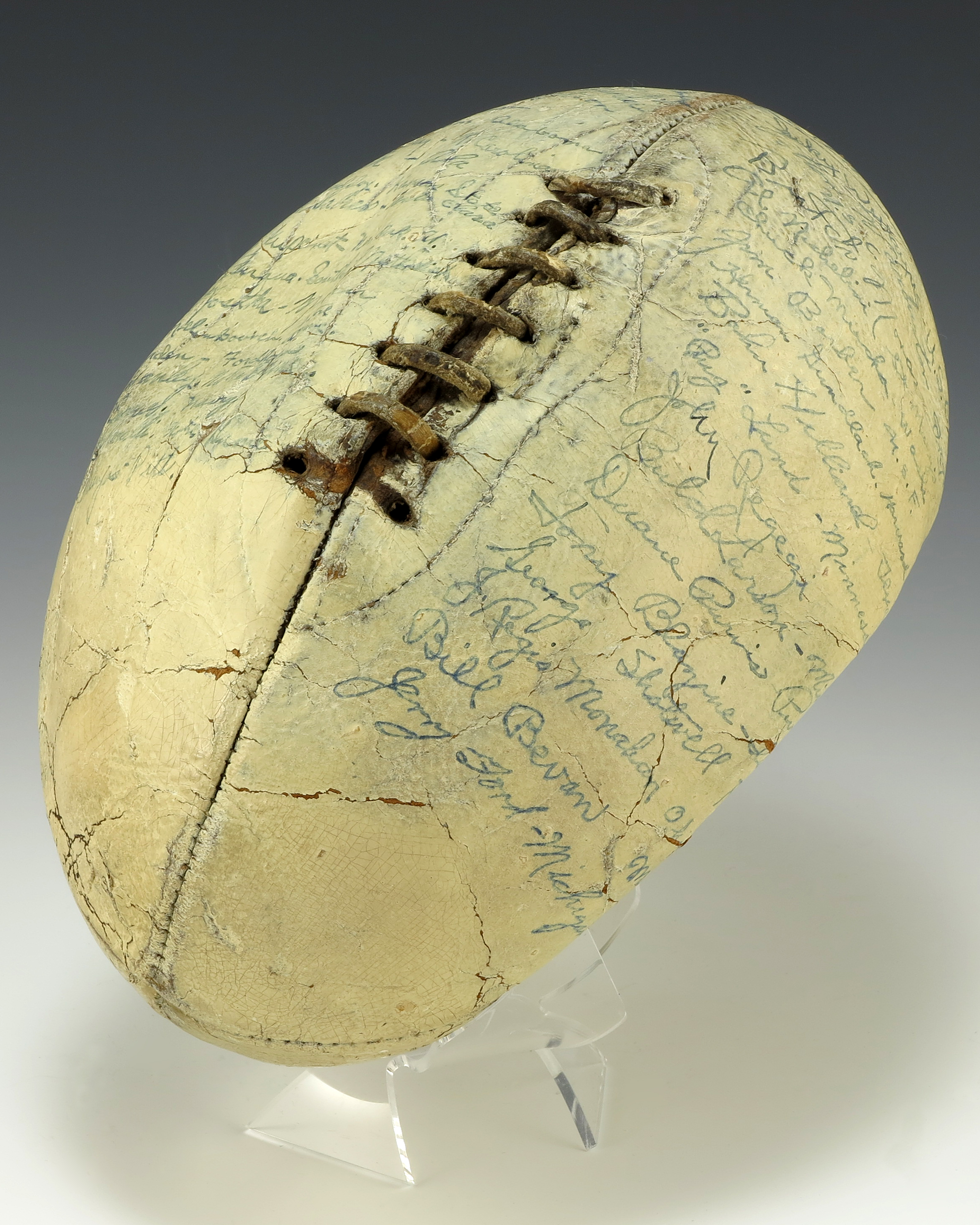
A football signed by the members of the 1935 Collegiate All-Star Team, including Gerald Ford.

The inaugural game in 1934, played before a crowd of 79,432 on August 31, was a scoreless tie between the All-Stars and the Chicago Bears. The following year, in a game that included University of Michigan graduate and future U.S. president Gerald Ford, the Bears won 5–0.

=== Highlights ===
The first All-Star team to win was the 1937 squad, coached by Gus Dorais, which won 6–0 over Curly Lambeau's Green Bay Packers. The only score came on a 47-yard touchdown pass from future Hall of Famer Sammy Baugh to Gaynell Tinsley. Baugh's Washington Redskins lost to the All-Stars the next year, but he did not play due to injury.

In the 1940s, the games were competitive affairs that attracted large crowds to Soldier Field. The college All-Stars had the benefit of being fully integrated, since the NFL's league-wide color barrier did not apply to the squad, meaning black players such as Kenny Washington (who played in the 1940 contest) were allowed to play in the game. As the talent level of pro football improved (and the NFL itself integrated), the pros came to dominate the series.

The qualifying criteria for the College All-Star squad was loose. The 1945 game featured Tom Harmon, whose professional career had begun in 1941, but had been interrupted by military service.

The All-Stars last won consecutive games in 1946 and 1947, and won only four of the final 29 games: the Philadelphia Eagles fell in 1950, the Cleveland Browns in 1955, and the Detroit Lions in 1958.

The last All-Star win came in 1963, when a college team coached by legendary quarterback Otto Graham beat Vince Lombardi's Green Bay Packers, 20–17.

In 1949, Ward, who by this time had founded the competing All-America Football Conference, attempted to have that league's champion, the perennially winning Browns, play that year's game instead of the NFL champion, but after the NFL threatened legal action, the Tribune board overruled Ward and renewed its agreement with the NFL.

=== Decline ===
Program for the 1966 game pitting the All-Stars against the World Champion Green Bay Packers.

By the late 1960s and the 1970s, enthusiasm for the game started to erode as NFL coaches became increasingly reluctant to let their new draftees play in the exhibition game due to their being forced to miss part of training camp, and their draftees being at considerable risk for injury. As early as 1949, these concerns had been raised after Dick Rifenburg suffered a serious knee injury practicing for the game, effectively ending his professional career before it began, and prompting Rifenburg's move into broadcasting. Dan Rooney, vice president of the Steelers, called the game one that "has turned into a farce" as early as 1970.

In 1974, a player's strike and an exodus of stars to the World Football League exacerbated this issue, as the NFL went to all-rookie rosters to allow the preseason to be played: with no rookies available to play for the College All-Stars, the game was cancelled that year.

During most of its run, the College All-Star Game was not particularly unique, since NFL teams frequently played exhibition games against non-NFL competition in its early decades. However, by the 1970s, the NFL was withdrawing from competition against teams that were not members of the league. Following the end of preseason games against teams from the Eastern Conference of the Canadian Football League in 1961, the NFL played only three games against non-NFL teams (excluding pre-merger exhibition games against AFL teams and College All-Star Games). The first two of these games, a 1969 split-squad match against a Continental Football League team and a 1972 split-squad match against a Seaboard Football League team, were large blowout wins for the NFL teams, while the third, between the Houston Oilers rookie and practice squad and the San Antonio Toros, was a much closer contest.

The final College All-Star Game took place in 1976 during a torrential downpour at Soldier Field on July 23. Despite featuring star players such as Chuck Muncie, Mike Pruitt, Lee Roy Selmon, and Jackie Slater, the All-Stars were hopelessly outmatched by the Pittsburgh Steelers, winners of consecutive Super Bowls (IX, X).

The star quarterback for the College All-Stars, Steeler draft pick Mike Kruczek of Boston College, left ten minutes into the first quarter after pulling his left thigh, with backup quarterback Craig Penrose of San Diego State suffering two broken fingers in the second quarter. Jeb Blount of Tulsa played most of the game.

With 1:22 remaining in the third quarter and the Steelers leading 24–0, high winds and lightning prompted All-Stars coach Ara Parseghian to call for a time out.

After the officials ordered both teams to their locker rooms, fans invaded the field and began sliding on the turf as the rain continued to fall heavily. Despite the efforts of officials, stadium security and Chicago Police, all attempts to clear the field failed, with a group of drunk fans tearing down the goalposts at the southern end of the stadium. However, by this time, the torrential rain had left parts of the field under 18 inches (45.5 cm) of water, meaning it would have been unplayable in any event.

At 11:01pm CDT, NFL Commissioner Pete Rozelle and the Tribune announced that the game had been called: the announcement was greeted with jeers, and numerous brawls broke out on the flooded field before order was finally restored.

Joe Washington of Oklahoma was selected as the MVP of the final College All-Star game.

=== Termination and legacy ===
Chicago Tribune Charities had every intention of staging a 1977 game, however, a combination of factors, including NFL coaches being increasingly reluctant to let their high draft picks play, rising insurance costs, and higher player salaries meant the game was no longer viable or competitive. As such, the Tribune announced on December 21, 1976, that the game would be discontinued. The game raised over $4 million for charity during the course of its 42-game run.

In the 42 College All-Star Games, the defending pro champions won 31, the All-Stars won nine, and two were ties, giving the collegians a .238 winning percentage. The 1976 College All-Star Game remains, as of 2025, the last time an NFL team has played any team from outside the league.

One aspect of the College All-Star Game was later revived: the concept of the league champion playing in the first game of the season was adopted in 2004 with the National Football League Kickoff game. Since then, the first game of the regular season is hosted by the defending Super Bowl champion.

== Game results ==
All games played at Soldier Field in Chicago, except for the 1943 and 1944 games, which were played at Dyche Stadium in Evanston, Illinois.

Year	Date	Winning team		Losing team		Attendance	Series	Ref.
1934	August 31	College All-Stars	0	Chicago Bears	0	79,432	Tied 0–0–1	
1935	August 29	Chicago Bears	5	College All-Stars	0	77,450	NFL 1–0–1	
1936	September 2	College All-Stars	7	Detroit Lions	7	76,000	NFL 1–0–2	
1937	September 1	College All-Stars	6	Green Bay Packers	0	84,560	Tied 1–1–2	
1938	August 31	College All-Stars	28	Washington Redskins	16	74,250	Colleges 2–1–2	
1939	August 30	New York Giants	9	College All-Stars	0	81,456	Tied 2–2–2	
1940	August 29	Green Bay Packers	45	College All-Stars	28	84,567	NFL 3–2–2	
1941	August 28	Chicago Bears	37	College All-Stars	13	98,203	NFL 4–2–2	
1942	August 28	Chicago Bears	21	College All-Stars	0	101,103	NFL 5–2–2	
1943	August 28	College All-Stars	27	Washington Redskins	7	48,437	NFL 5–3–2	
1944	August 30	Chicago Bears	24	College All-Stars	21	49,246	NFL 6–3–2	
1945	August 30	Green Bay Packers	19	College All-Stars	7	92,753	NFL 7–3–2	
1946	August 23	College All-Stars	16	Los Angeles Rams	0	97,380	NFL 7–4–2	
1947	August 22	College All-Stars	16	Chicago Bears	0	105,840	NFL 7–5–2	
1948	August 22	Chicago Cardinals	28	College All-Stars	0	101,220	NFL 8–5–2	
1949	August 22	Philadelphia Eagles	38	College All-Stars	0	93,780	NFL 9–5–2	
1950	August 11	College All-Stars	17	Philadelphia Eagles	7	88,885	NFL 9–6–2	
1951	August 17	Cleveland Browns	33	College All-Stars	0	92,180	NFL 10–6–2	
1952	August 15	Los Angeles Rams	10	College All-Stars	7	88,316	NFL 11–6–2	
1953	August 14	Detroit Lions	24	College All-Stars	10	93,818	NFL 12–6–2	
1954	August 13	Detroit Lions	31	College All-Stars	6	93,470	NFL 13–6–2	
1955	August 12	College All-Stars	30	Cleveland Browns	27	75,000	NFL 13–7–2	
1956	August 10	Cleveland Browns	26	College All-Stars	0	75,000	NFL 14–7–2	
1957	August 9	New York Giants	22	College All-Stars	12	75,000	NFL 15–7–2	
1958	August 15	College All-Stars	35	Detroit Lions	19	70,000	NFL 15–8–2	
1959	August 14	Baltimore Colts	29	College All-Stars	0	70,000	NFL 16–8–2	
1960	August 12	Baltimore Colts	32	College All-Stars	7	70,000	NFL 17–8–2	
1961	August 4	Philadelphia Eagles	28	College All-Stars	14	66,000	NFL 18–8–2	
1962	August 3	Green Bay Packers	42	College All-Stars	20	65,000	NFL 19–8–2	
1963	August 2	College All-Stars	20	Green Bay Packers	17	65,000	NFL 19–9–2	
1964	August 7	Chicago Bears	28	College All-Stars	17	65,000	NFL 20–9–2	
1965	August 6	Cleveland Browns	24	College All-Stars	16	68,000	NFL 21–9–2	
1966	August 5	Green Bay Packers	38	College All-Stars	0	72,000	NFL 22–9–2	
1967	August 4	Green Bay Packers	27	College All-Stars	0	70,934	NFL 23–9–2	
1968	August 2	Green Bay Packers	34	College All-Stars	17	69,917	NFL 24–9–2	
1969	August 1	New York Jets	26	College All-Stars	24	74,208	AFL 1–0–0	
1970	July 31	Kansas City Chiefs	24	College All-Stars	3	69,940	NFL 25–9–2	
1971	July 30	Baltimore Colts	24	College All-Stars	17	52,289	NFL 26–9–2	
1972	July 28	Dallas Cowboys	20	College All-Stars	7	54,162	NFL 27–9–2	
1973	July 27	Miami Dolphins	14	College All-Stars	3	54,103	NFL 28–9–2	
1974	July 26	Canceled due to 1974 NFL strike Game was originally scheduled between the Miami Dolphins and College All-Stars						
1975	August 1	Pittsburgh Steelers	21	College All-Stars	14	54,562	NFL 29–9–2	
1976	July 23	Pittsburgh Steelers	24	College All-Stars	0	52,095	NFL 30–9–2	†

† Game was called with 1:22 left in the 3rd quarter due to inclement weather.

== Franchise records ==
Listed by number of appearances

Franchise	Games	Wins	Losses	Ties	Pct.	Winning years	Non-wins
Green Bay Packers	8	6	2	0	.750	1940, 1945, 1962, 1966, 1967, 1968	1937, 1963
Chicago Bears	7	5	1	1	.786	1935, 1941, 1942, 1944, 1964	1934, 1947
Cleveland Browns	4	3	1	0	.750	1951, 1956, 1965	1955
Detroit Lions	4	2	1	1	.625	1953, 1954	1936, 1958
Baltimore Colts	3	3	0	0	1.000	1959, 1960, 1971	
Philadelphia Eagles	3	2	1	0	.667	1949, 1961	1950
New York Giants	2	2	0	0	1.000	1939, 1957	
Pittsburgh Steelers	2	2	0	0	1.000	1975, 1976	
Los Angeles Rams	2	1	1	0	.500	1952	1946
Washington Redskins	2	0	2	0	.000		1938, 1943
Chicago Cardinals	1	1	0	0	1.000	1948	
New York Jets	1	1	0	0	1.000	1969	
Kansas City Chiefs	1	1	0	0	1.000	1970	
Dallas Cowboys	1	1	0	0	1.000	1972	
Miami Dolphins	1	1	0	0	1.000	1973	
Total	42	31	9	2	.762		

- Miami's second consecutive appearance in 1974 was cancelled due to NFL players' strike.

== MVPs ==
The Most Valuable Player award was given from 1938 through 1973 and was always awarded to a player on the College All-Stars

Year	Player	Position	College
1938	Cecil Isbell	Running back	Purdue
1939	Bill Osmanski	Running back	Holy Cross
1940	Ambrose Schindler	Running back	USC
1941	George Franck	Running back	Minnesota
1942	Bruce Smith	Running back	Minnesota
1943	Pat Harder	Running back	Wisconsin
1944	Glenn Dobbs	Running back	Tulsa
1945	Charley Trippi	Multiple	Georgia
1946	Elroy Hirsch	Running back	Michigan
1947	Claude Young	Running back	Illinois
1948	Jay Rodemeyer	Running back	Kentucky
1949	Bill Fischer	Offensive lineman	Notre Dame
1950	Charlie Justice	Running back	North Carolina
1951	Lewis McFadin	Multiple	Texas
1952	Babe Parilli	Quarterback	Kentucky
1953	Gib Dawson	Multiple	Texas
1954	Carlton Massey	Defensive end	Texas
1955	Ralph Guglielmi	Quarterback	Notre Dame
1956	Bob Pellegrini	Linebacker	Maryland
1957	John Brodie	Quarterback	Stanford
1958	Bobby Mitchell	Halfback/Wide receiver	Illinois
1958	Jim Ninowski	Quarterback	Michigan State
1959	Bob Ptacek	Running back	Michigan
1960	Jim Leo	End	Cincinnati
1961	Billy Kilmer	Quarterback	UCLA
1962	John Hadl	Quarterback	Kansas
1963	Ron Vander Kelen	Quarterback	Wisconsin
1964	Charley Taylor	Wide receiver	Arizona State
1965	John Huarte	Quarterback	Notre Dame
1966	Gary Lane	Quarterback	Missouri
1967	Charles "Bubba" Smith	Defensive end	Michigan State
1968	Larry Csonka	Running back	Syracuse
1969	Greg Cook	Quarterback	Cincinnati
1970	Bruce Taylor	Defensive back	Boston University
1971	Richard Harris	Defensive end	Grambling State
1972	Pat Sullivan	Quarterback	Auburn
1973	Ray Guy	Punter	Southern Mississippi

== Television ==
- 1950 (DuMont) Jack Brickhouse
- 1951 (DuMont) Jack Brickhouse, Red Grange, and Harry Creighton
- 1952 (DuMont) Jack Brickhouse and Harry Creighton
- 1953 (DuMont) Jack Brickhouse and Harry Creighton
- 1954 (ABC) Red Grange and Joe Boland
- 1955 (ABC) Bill McColgan and Earl Gillespie
- 1956 (ABC) Jack Drees and Red Grange
- 1957 (ABC) Jack Drees and Red Grange
- 1958 (ABC) Jack Drees and Red Grange
- 1959 (ABC) Ray Scott and Red Grange
- 1960 (ABC) Ray Scott and Russ Hodges
- 1961 (ABC) Jack Drees and Russ Hodges
- 1962 (ABC) Curt Gowdy, Paul Christman, Johnny Lujack, and Bill Flemming
- 1963 (ABC) Curt Gowdy, Paul Christman, and Johnny Lujack
- 1964 (ABC) Curt Gowdy, Paul Christman, Johnny Lujack, and Bill Flemming
- 1965 (ABC) Chris Schenkel, Bill Flemming, and Ken Coleman
- 1966 (ABC) Chris Schenkel, Terry Brennan, and Bill Flemming
- 1967 (ABC) Chris Schenkel and Bud Wilkinson
- 1968 (ABC) Chris Schenkel, Bud Wilkinson, Frank Gifford and Bill Flemming
- 1969 (ABC) Chris Schenkel, Bud Wilkinson and Kyle Rote
- 1970 (ABC) Keith Jackson, Bud Wilkinson, Don Meredith, and Dave Diles
- 1971 (ABC) Chris Schenkel, Bud Wilkinson, and Howard Cosell
- 1972 (ABC) Chris Schenkel, Bud Wilkinson, and Howard Cosell
- 1973 (ABC) Chris Schenkel, Bud Wilkinson, and Howard Cosell
- 1975 (ABC) Keith Jackson, Bud Wilkinson, and Howard Cosell
- 1976 (ABC) Frank Gifford and Bud Wilkinson

== See also ==
- Pro Bowl, the AFC–NFC all-star game
- Playoff Bowl, another discontinued annual NFL game
- Armed Forces Benefit Football Game, a discontinued annual preseason game at Soldier Field
- Pro Football Hall of Fame Game
- College football all-star games
