= 1939 Oregon State Beavers football team =

American college football season

1939 Oregon State Beavers football

Pineapple Bowl champion

Pineapple Bowl, W 39–6 vs. Hawaii
- Conference: Pacific Coast Conference
- Record: 9–1–1 (6–1–1 PCC)
- Head coach: Lon Stiner (7th season)
- Home stadium: Bell Field

1939 Pacific Coast Conference football standings
	Conf.					Overall
Team	W		L		T	W		L		T
No. 3 USC $	5	–	0	–	2	8	–	0	–	2
No. 7 UCLA	5	–	0	–	3	6	–	0	–	4
Oregon State	6	–	1	–	1	9	–	1	–	1
Washington	4	–	4	–	0	4	–	5	–	1
Oregon	3	–	3	–	1	3	–	4	–	1
Washington State	3	–	5	–	0	4	–	5	–	0
Montana	1	–	2	–	0	3	–	6	–	0
California	2	–	5	–	0	3	–	7	–	0
Stanford	0	–	6	–	1	1	–	7	–	1
Idaho	0	–	3	–	0	2	–	6	–	0
$ – Conference champion; Rankings from AP Poll

The 1939 Oregon State Beavers football team represented Oregon State College in the 1939 college football season.

The team played its home games at Bell Field in Corvallis, Oregon and Multnomah Stadium in Portland.

The Beavers ended this season with nine wins, one loss, and one tie. The Beavers scored 186 points and allowed 77 points. Oregon State won the inaugural Pineapple Bowl, 39–6. The team was led by head coach Lon Stiner.

Oregon State was not ranked in the final AP poll, but it was ranked at No. 16 in the 1939 Williamson System ratings, No. 18 according to the Azziratem System favored by Illustrated Football Annual magazine, and at No. 53 in the final Litkenhous Ratings for 1939.

== Schedule ==
Date	Opponent	Rank	Site	Result	Attendance	Source
September 30	at Stanford		Stanford Stadium; Stanford, CA	W 12–0	20,000	
October 7	Idaho		Bell Field; Corvallis, OR	W 7–6	8,000	
October 14	at Portland*		Multnomah Stadium; Portland, OR	W 14–12		
October 21	at Washington		Husky Stadium; Seattle, WA	W 13–7	14,000	
October 28	Washington State	No. 15	Bell Field; Corvallis, OR	W 13–0	8,000	
November 4	vs. No. 7 USC	No. 11	Multnomah Stadium; Portland, OR	L 7–19	32,611	
November 11	at Oregon		Hayward Field; Eugene, OR (rivalry)	W 19–14	21,000	
November 18	California	No. 19	Bell Field; Corvallis, OR	W 21–0	9,500	
November 25	at No. 13 UCLA		Los Angeles Coliseum; Los Angeles, CA	T 13–13	50,000	
December 25	at Hawaii All-Stars*		Honolulu Stadium; Honolulu, Territory of Hawaii	W 28–0	13,000	
January 1, 1940	at Hawaii*		Honolulu Stadium; Honolulu, Territory of Hawaii (Pineapple Bowl)	W 39–6	15,000	
*Non-conference game; Rankings from AP Poll released prior to the game

== Team players drafted into the NFL ==
Player	Position	Round	Pick	NFL club
Elbie Schultz	Tackle	4	28	Philadelphia Eagles
Morris Kohler	Back	16	145	Cleveland Rams
Johnny Hackenbruck	Tackle	17	156	Detroit Lions
