= 1939 Washington Huskies football team =

American college football season

1939 Washington Huskies football
- Conference: Pacific Coast Conference
- Record: 4–5 (4–4 PCC)
- Head coach: Jimmy Phelan (10th season)
- Captain: Chuck Bechtol
- Home stadium: University of Washington Stadium

1939 Pacific Coast Conference football standings
	Conf.					Overall
Team	W		L		T	W		L		T
No. 3 USC $	5	–	0	–	2	8	–	0	–	2
No. 7 UCLA	5	–	0	–	3	6	–	0	–	4
Oregon State	6	–	1	–	1	9	–	1	–	1
Washington	4	–	4	–	0	4	–	5	–	1
Oregon	3	–	3	–	1	3	–	4	–	1
Washington State	3	–	5	–	0	4	–	5	–	0
Montana	1	–	2	–	0	3	–	6	–	0
California	2	–	5	–	0	3	–	7	–	0
Stanford	0	–	6	–	1	1	–	7	–	1
Idaho	0	–	3	–	0	2	–	6	–	0
$ – Conference champion; Rankings from AP Poll

The 1939 Washington Huskies football team was an American football team that represented the University of Washington during the 1939 college football season. In its tenth season under head coach Jimmy Phelan, the team compiled a 4–5 record, finished in sixth place in the Pacific Coast Conference, and was outscored by its opponents by a combined total of 93 to 77. Chuck Bechtol was the team captain.

Washington was ranked at No. 82 (out of 609 teams) in the final Litkenhous Ratings for 1939.

== Schedule ==
Date	Opponent	Site	Result	Attendance	Source
September 30	Pittsburgh*	University of Washington Stadium; Seattle, WA	L 6–27	25,000	
October 7	UCLA	University of Washington Stadium; Seattle, WA	L 7–14	13,000	
October 14	at Washington State	Rogers Field; Pullman, WA (rivalry)	L 0–6	18,000	
October 21	Oregon State	University of Washington Stadium; Seattle, WA	L 7–13	14,000	
October 28	Stanford	University of Washington Stadium; Seattle, WA	W 8–5	20,000	
November 4	Montana	University of Washington Stadium; Seattle, WA	W 9–0	16,000	
November 11	at California	California Memorial Stadium; Berkeley, CA	W 13–6	25,000	
November 23	Oregon	University of Washington Stadium; Seattle, WA (rivalry)	W 20–13	25,000	
December 2	at No. 1 USC	Los Angeles Memorial Coliseum; Los Angeles, CA	L 7–9	50,000	
*Non-conference game; Rankings from AP Poll released prior to the game; Source:

== NFL draft selections ==
One University of Washington Husky was selected in the 1940 NFL draft, which lasted 22 rounds with 200 selections.

= Husky Hall of Fame

Player	Position	Round	Pick	NFL club
Don Jones	Back	9	2	Philadelphia Eagles
