= 1939 Oregon Webfoots football team =

American college football season

1939 Oregon Webfoots football
- Conference: Pacific Coast Conference
- Record: 3–4–1 (3–3–1 PCC)
- Head coach: Tex Oliver (2nd season)
- Captain: None
- Home stadium: Hayward Field, Multnomah Stadium

1939 Pacific Coast Conference football standings
	Conf.					Overall
Team	W		L		T	W		L		T
No. 3 USC $	5	–	0	–	2	8	–	0	–	2
No. 7 UCLA	5	–	0	–	3	6	–	0	–	4
Oregon State	6	–	1	–	1	9	–	1	–	1
Washington	4	–	4	–	0	4	–	5	–	1
Oregon	3	–	3	–	1	3	–	4	–	1
Washington State	3	–	5	–	0	4	–	5	–	0
Montana	1	–	2	–	0	3	–	6	–	0
California	2	–	5	–	0	3	–	7	–	0
Stanford	0	–	6	–	1	1	–	7	–	1
Idaho	0	–	3	–	0	2	–	6	–	0
$ – Conference champion; Rankings from AP Poll

The 1939 Oregon Webfoots football team represented the University of Oregon in the Pacific Coast Conference (PCC) during the 1939 college football season. Led by second-year head coach Tex Oliver, the Webfoots compiled a 3–4–1 record (3–3–1 in PCC, fifth), outscored their opponents 101 to 74, and recorded three shutouts.

Oregon was not ranked in the final AP poll, but it was ranked at No. 49 in the 1939 Williamson System ratings, and at No. 50 in the Litkenhous Ratings.

Oregon played three home games on campus at Hayward Field in Eugene and one at Multnomah Stadium in Portland.

== Schedule ==
Date	Opponent	Rank	Site	Result	Attendance	Source
September 30	at USC		Los Angeles Memorial Coliseum; Los Angeles, CA	T 7–7	41,000	
October 7	Stanford		Multnomah Stadium; Portland, OR	W 10–0	20,000	
October 14	at California		California Memorial Stadium; Berkeley, CA	W 6–0	40,000	
October 21	Gonzaga*	No. 11	Hayward Field; Eugene, OR	L 7–12	5,500	
October 28	at UCLA		Los Angeles Memorial Coliseum; Los Angeles, CA	L 6–16	40,000	
November 4	Washington State		Hayward Field; Eugene, OR	W 38–0	4,500	
November 11	Oregon State		Hayward Field; Eugene, OR (rivalry)	L 14–19	21,000	
November 23	at Washington		Husky Stadium; Seattle, WA (rivalry)	L 13–20	25,000	
*Non-conference game; Rankings from AP Poll released prior to the game; Source:
