= Elliott J. Schuchardt =

American civil liberties attorney (born 1966)

Elliott J. Schuchardt is an American politician, writer and civil liberties activist.

Schuchardt is the author of America's Achilles Heel: How to Protect Your Family When America Loses the Reserve Currency. The book argues that the U.S. dollar is artificially overvalued, due to the dollar's use as the world's reserve currency. Schuchardt argues that the dollar could suffer a material decline in value, if the commodities markets use a different reserve currency in the future.

Schuchardt is a candidate for the Tennessee General Assembly in the August 2026 election.

Schuchardt is known for filing a lawsuit against the federal government, which contended that the United States was unlawfully collecting and searching the national e-mail database. The lawsuit was dismissed in 2020 by the U.S. Court of Appeals for the 3rd Circuit for failure to "rebut the government’s evidence that his claims were untrue".

In 2015, Schuchardt filed and argued the case that obtained the injunction that prevented Sweet Briar College, located in Amherst, Virginia, from closing its doors after more than a century.

== Candidate for the Tennessee General Assembly ==
On November 20, 2025, Schuchardt announced that he was running for the Tennessee General Assembly.

Schuchardt is also calling for reform of the law of defamation in Tennessee. Schuchardt says that the existing law is unconstitutional, because it allows a judge to make decisions about the case on the basis of affidavits. He is currently suspended from the practice of law. Schuchardt says that the constitution requires a hearing, to determine issues about credibility.

== America's Achilles Heel ==
Schuchardt is the author of America's Achilles Heel: How to Protect Your Family When America Loses the Reserve Currency. The book argues that the U.S. dollar is artificially overvalued, due to the dollar's use as the world's reserve currency. Schuchardt argues that the dollar could suffer a material decline in value, if the commodities markets use a different reserve currency in the future.

Schuchardt reminds his readers of the Tiffin Dilemma, hypothesized by Yale economist Robert Triffin, in the early 1960s. Triffin argued that a national currency used as the world's reserve currency would eventually collapse due to the need to print large quantities of it to keep the global economy running efficiently. This oversupply erodes international faith in the currency, causing its value to fall.

The book argues that the dollar's current value is maintained by a de facto monopoly on global oil sales, a system often defended by military power. If oil markets were to reject the dollar and price oil in an alternative currency, the dollar's value could plummet overnight.

Schuchardt highlights the efforts of the BRICS nations (Brazil, Russia, India, China, and South Africa) to establish a rival reserve currency. This alliance controls a significant portion of the world's oil and grain production, giving them the power to potentially reroute global trade away from the U.S. dollar, causing chaos in American supply chains and a doubling of import prices.

== Government surveillance litigation ==
In 2014, Schuchardt filed suit against President Barack Obama and several senior government officials contending that the federal government was improperly collecting and "data-mining" the national e-mail database. The lawsuit was initially dismissed by the District Court on the ground that Schuchardt did not have standing to pursue the case. In 2016, the United States Court of Appeals for the Third Circuit reversed, sending the case back for reconsideration. In 2019, the case was dismissed again for failure to "rebut the government’s evidence that his claims were untrue, that decision was reaffirmed in 2020 by the U.S. Court of Appeals for the 3rd Circuit.

== Sweet Briar College litigation ==
In 2015, Sweet Briar College in Amherst, Virginia, announced they would be closing after more than a century due to declining enrollment and an insufficient endowment. In March 2015, Schuchardt filed a lawsuit against the college on behalf of an alumna of the college. The lawsuit alleged that the college's decision to close had damaged the value of the alumna's university degree. Schuchardt subsequently filed an amended complaint on behalf of a number of current and former students of the college.

In April 2015, Schuchardt obtained an injunction on behalf of the student / alumnae group, which prevented the college board from taking any further action to close the school. In June 2015, the Virginia Attorney General's office announced a mediated agreement to keep Sweet Briar College open for the 2015–16 academic year. The agreement called for Sweet Briar College president James Jones to resign.

== National Rifle Association litigation ==
Schuchardt represented millionaire activist, David Dell'Aquila, in a class action lawsuit filed against the National Rifle Association of America (NRA) and its President, Wayne LaPierre. The complaint in the case contended that the National Rifle Association and LaPierre, fraudulently solicited donations from donors during the period from 2016 through 2019, because the NRA knew that the donations would not be used for the purposes solicited. Due to Schuchardt's suspension from practicing law, he was ultimately forced to withdraw from the case.
