= 1939 Rose Bowl =

American college football game

- 25th Rose Bowl Game
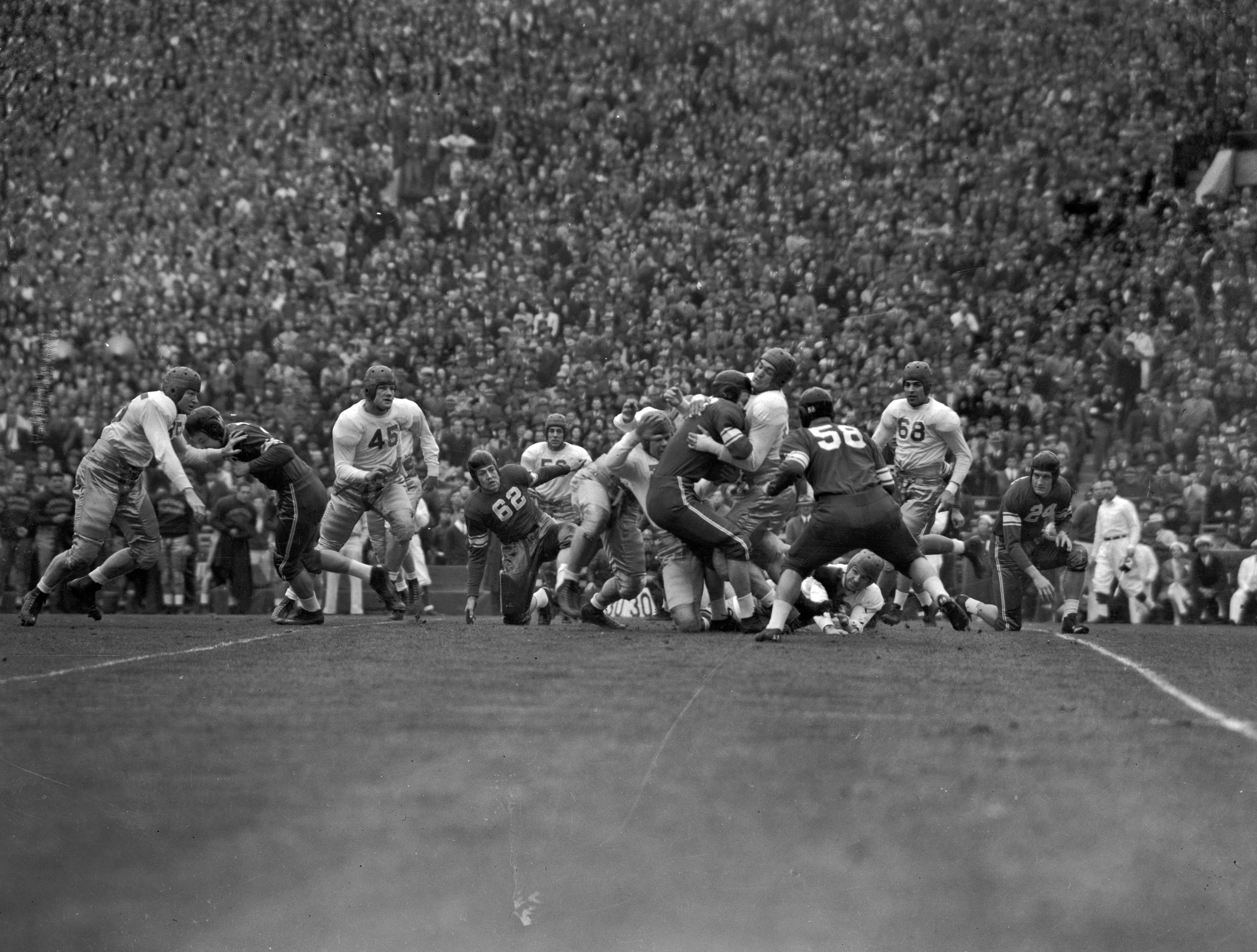
USC Trojans	Duke Blue Devils
(8–2)	(9–0)
PCC	SoCon
7	3
Head coach: Howard Jones	Head coach: Wallace Wade
AP 7	AP 3
	1	2	3	4	Total
USC	0	0	0	7	7
Duke	0	0	0	3	3
- Date: January 2, 1939
- Season: 1938
- Stadium: Rose Bowl
- Location: Pasadena, California
- MVP: Al Krueger (USC E); Doyle Nave (USC QB)
- Favorite: USC by 10 to 14 points
- Referee: Bob Morris (Pacific Coast; split crew: Pacific Coast, Southern)
- Attendance: 93,852

The 1939 Rose Bowl was the 25th edition of the college football bowl game, played at the Rose Bowl in Pasadena, California, on Monday, January 2 and concluded the 1938 college football season.

The seventh-ranked USC Trojans of the Pacific Coast Conference (PCC) downed the undefeated #3 Duke Blue Devils of the Southern Conference, 7–3.

Scoreless after three quarters, Duke gained the lead with a 23-yard field goal by Tony Ruffa early in the fourth. However, backup quarterback Doyle Nave of the Trojans completed four straight passes to sophomore end "Antelope" Al Krueger, who outmaneuvered Eric "The Red" Tipton and scored the winning touchdown with one minute remaining. Krueger's touchdown marked the first points scored against Duke during the season. For his performance in the game, Krueger was inducted into the Rose Bowl Hall of Fame in the class of 1995.

== Scoring ==
=== First quarter ===
No scoring

=== Second quarter ===
No scoring

=== Third quarter ===
No scoring

=== Fourth quarter ===
- Duke – Tony Ruffa 23-yard field goal
- USC – Al Krueger, 19-yard pass from Doyle Nave (Phil Gaspar kick)

== Statistics ==
Team stats	USC	Duke
First downs	13	5
Rushing yards	128	84
Passing (att–com–int)	30–12–3	13–4–2
Passing yards	81	59
Total offense	209	143

== Notes ==
- This was the 50th Tournament of Roses Parade, with ten-year-old Grand Marshal Shirley Temple (the youngest) presiding over the parade and the game

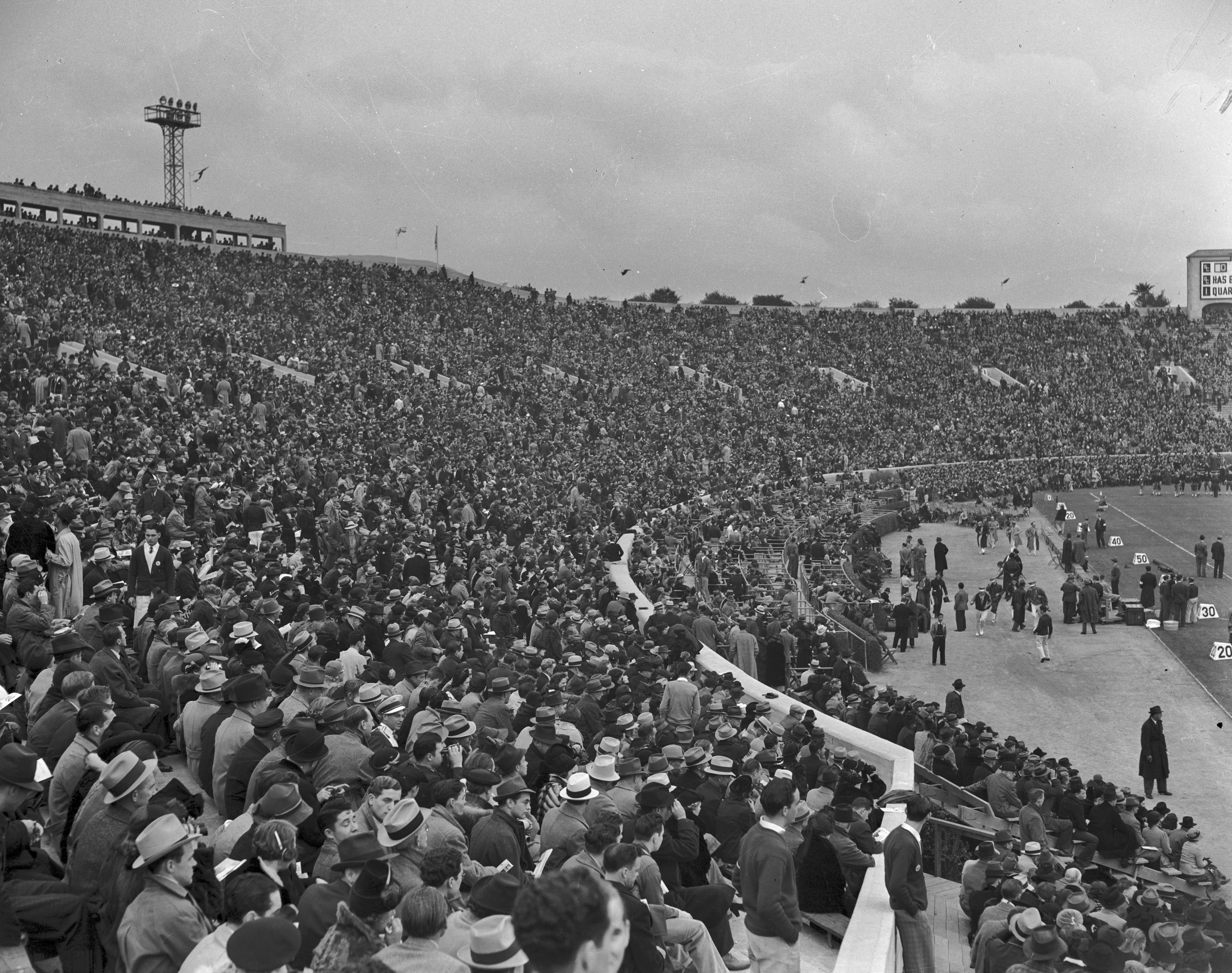
A crowd of over 90,000 assembled to watch the game.
