= 1939 UCLA Bruins football team =

American college football season

1939 UCLA Bruins football
- Conference: Pacific Coast Conference

Ranking
- AP: No. 7
- Record: 6–0–4 (5–0–3 PCC)
- Head coach: Edwin C. Horrell (1st season)
- Home stadium: Los Angeles Memorial Coliseum

1939 Pacific Coast Conference football standings
	Conf.					Overall
Team	W		L		T	W		L		T
No. 3 USC $	5	–	0	–	2	8	–	0	–	2
No. 7 UCLA	5	–	0	–	3	6	–	0	–	4
Oregon State	6	–	1	–	1	9	–	1	–	1
Washington	4	–	4	–	0	4	–	5	–	1
Oregon	3	–	3	–	1	3	–	4	–	1
Washington State	3	–	5	–	0	4	–	5	–	0
Montana	1	–	2	–	0	3	–	6	–	0
California	2	–	5	–	0	3	–	7	–	0
Stanford	0	–	6	–	1	1	–	7	–	1
Idaho	0	–	3	–	0	2	–	6	–	0
$ – Conference champion; Rankings from AP Poll

The 1939 UCLA Bruins football team was an American football team that represented the University of California, Los Angeles during the 1939 college football season. In their first year under head coach Edwin C. Horrell (after 14 years under William H. Spaulding as head coach), the Bruins compiled a 6–0–4 record (5–0–3 conference), finished in second place in the Pacific Coast Conference, played #3-ranked USC to a scoreless tie, and were ranked #7 in the final AP Poll.

UCLA was also ranked at No. 15 in the 1939 Williamson System ratings, and at No. 34 in the final Litkenhous Ratings for 1939.

Jackie Robinson, who is better known for breaking the color barrier in pro baseball, was a running back on the team.

== Schedule ==
Date	Opponent	Rank	Site	Result	Attendance	Source
September 29	TCU*		Los Angeles Memorial Coliseum; Los Angeles, CA	W 6–2	60,000	
October 7	at Washington		Husky Stadium; Seattle, WA	W 14–7	13,000	
October 14	at Stanford		Stanford Stadium; Stanford, CA	T 14–14	18,000	
October 21	Montana		Los Angeles Memorial Coliseum; Los Angeles, CA	W 20–6	25,000	
October 28	Oregon		Los Angeles Memorial Coliseum; Los Angeles, CA	W 16–6	40,000	
November 4	California	No. 19	Los Angeles Memorial Coliseum; Los Angeles, CA (rivalry)	W 20–7	55,000	
November 18	No. 14 Santa Clara*	No. 11	Los Angeles Memorial Coliseum; Los Angeles, CA	T 0–0	55,000	
November 25	Oregon State	No. 13	Los Angeles Memorial Coliseum; Los Angeles, CA	T 13–13	50,000	
November 30	Washington State	No. 13	Los Angeles Memorial Coliseum; Los Angeles, CA	W 24–7	25,000	
December 9	No. 3 USC	No. 9	Los Angeles Memorial Coliseum; Los Angeles, CA (Victory Bell)	T 0–0	103,303	
*Non-conference game; Rankings from AP Poll released prior to the game
