= 1938 New York Giants season =

NFL team 14th season

- Head coach: Steve Owen
- Home stadium: Polo Grounds

Results
- Record: 8–2–1
- Division place: 1st NFL Eastern
- Playoffs: Won NFL Championship (vs. Packers) 23–17

The 1938 New York Giants season was the franchise's 14th season in the National Football League.

== Schedule ==
| Week | Date | Opponent | Result | Record | Venue | Recap |
|---|---|---|---|---|---|---|
| 1 | September 11 | at **Pittsburgh Pirates** | **W** 27–14 | 1–0 | Forbes Field | Recap |
| 2 | Bye | | | | | |
| 3 | September 25 | at **Philadelphia Eagles** | **L** 10–14 | 1–1 | Philadelphia Municipal Stadium | Recap |
| 4 | October 3 | **Pittsburgh Pirates** | **L** 10–13 | 1–2 | Polo Grounds | Recap |
| 5 | October 9 | at **Washington Redskins** | **W** 10–7 | 2–2 | Griffith Stadium | Recap |
| 6 | October 16 | **Philadelphia Eagles** | **W** 17–7 | 3–2 | Polo Grounds | Recap |
| 7 | October 23 | **Brooklyn Dodgers** | **W** 28–14 | 4–2 | Polo Grounds | Recap |
| 8 | Bye | | | | | |
| 9 | November 6 | Chicago Cardinals | **W** 6–0 | 5–2 | Polo Grounds | Recap |
| 10 | November 13 | Cleveland Rams | **W** 28–0 | 6–2 | Polo Grounds | Recap |
| 11 | November 20 | Green Bay Packers | **W** 15–3 | 7–2 | Polo Grounds | Recap |
| 12 | November 24 | at **Brooklyn Dodgers** | **T** 7–7 | 7–2–1 | Ebbets Field | Recap |
| 13 | December 4 | **Washington Redskins** | **W** 36–0 | 8–2–1 | Polo Grounds | Recap |
Note: Intra-division opponents are in **bold** text.

== Game summaries ==
=== Week 1: at Pittsburgh Pirates ===
Week One: New York Giants at Pittsburgh Pirates

| Quarter | 1 | 2 | 3 | 4 | Total |
|---|---|---|---|---|---|
| Giants | 6 | 14 | 0 | 7 | 27 |
| Pirates | 7 | 7 | 0 | 0 | 14 |

at Forbes Field, Pittsburgh, Pennsylvania

- Date: September 11
- Game attendance: 17,340

Game information

First quarter

- PIT Whizzer White 4-yard run (Armand Niccolai kick)
- NYG Tuffy Leemans 1-yard run (kick blocked)

Second quarter

- PIT Eggs Manske 23-yard pass from Frank Filchock (Niccolai kick)
- NYG Lee Shaffer 3-yard pass from Ed Danowski (Hank Soar kick)
- NYG Shaffer 11-yard pass from Danowski (Ward Cuff kick)

Fourth quarter

- NYG Soar 1-yard run (Cuff kick)

=== Week 3: at Philadelphia Eagles ===
Week Three: New York Giants at Philadelphia Eagles

| Quarter | 1 | 2 | 3 | 4 | Total |
|---|---|---|---|---|---|
| Giants | 0 | 7 | 3 | 0 | 10 |
| Eagles | 0 | 7 | 0 | 7 | 14 |

at Philadelphia Municipal Stadium, Philadelphia, Pennsylvania

- Date: September 25
- Game attendance: 23,877

Game information

Second quarter

- PHI Bob Pylman 88-yard fumble return (Henry Reese kick)
- NYG Jim Poole 28-yard pass from Danowski (Cuff kick)

Third quarter

- NYG Cuff 23-yard FG

Fourth quarter

- PHI Joe Carter 92-yard fumble return (Reese kick)

=== Week 4: vs. Pittsburgh Pirates ===
Week Four: Pittsburgh Pirates at New York Giants

| Quarter | 1 | 2 | 3 | 4 | Total |
|---|---|---|---|---|---|
| Pirates | 0 | 7 | 0 | 6 | 13 |
| Giants | 7 | 0 | 3 | 0 | 10 |

at Polo Grounds, New York, New York

- Date: October 3
- Game time: Night
- Game attendance: 18,805

Game information

First quarter

- NYG Cuff 18-yard pass from Danowski (Cuff kick)

Second quarter

- PIT Bill Sortet 24-yard pass from Filchock (Niccolai kick)

Third quarter

- NYG Cuff 10-yard FG

Fourth quarter

- PIT Sortet 13-yard pass from Filchock (kick failed)

=== Week 5: at Washington Redskins ===
Week Five: New York Giants at Washington Redskins

| Quarter | 1 | 2 | 3 | 4 | Total |
|---|---|---|---|---|---|
| Giants | 3 | 0 | 0 | 7 | 10 |
| Redskins | 0 | 7 | 0 | 0 | 7 |

at Griffith Stadium, Washington, DC

- Date: October 9
- Game attendance: 37,500

Game information

First quarter

- NYG Cuff 17-yard FG

Second quarter

- WAS Bob Masterson pass from Sammy Baugh (Masterson kick)

Fourth quarter

- NYG Jim Lee Howell 18-yard pass from Danowski (Cuff kick)

=== Week 6: vs. Philadelphia Eagles ===
Week Six: Philadelphia Eagles at New York Giants

| Quarter | 1 | 2 | 3 | 4 | Total |
|---|---|---|---|---|---|
| Eagles | 0 | 0 | 7 | 0 | 7 |
| Giants | 0 | 14 | 3 | 0 | 17 |

at Polo Grounds, New York, New York

- Date: October 16
- Game attendance: 33,187

Game information

Second quarter

- NYG Bull Karcis 76-yard fumble return (Cuff kick)
- NYG Leemans 3-yard run (Cuff kick)

Third quarter

- PHI Woody Dow 25-yard pass from Emmett Mortell (Reese kick)
- NYG Cuff 20-yard FG

=== Week 7: vs. Brooklyn Dodgers ===
Week Seven: Brooklyn Dodgers at New York Giants

| Quarter | 1 | 2 | 3 | 4 | Total |
|---|---|---|---|---|---|
| Dodgers | 0 | 0 | 0 | 14 | 14 |
| Giants | 7 | 21 | 0 | 0 | 28 |

at Polo Grounds, New York, New York

- Date: October 23
- Game attendance: 36,228

Game information

First quarter

- NYG Howell 31-yard pass from Danowski (Cuff kick)

Second quarter

- NYG Karcis 1-yard run (Cuff kick)
- NYG Len Barnum 1-yard run (Cuff kick)
- NYG Ray Hanken 5-yard pass from Leemans (Kink Richards kick)

Fourth quarter

- BRK Beattie Feathers 8-yard run (Ace Parker kick)
- BRK Scrapper Farrell 26-yard run (Parker kick)

=== Week 9: vs. Chicago Cardinals ===
Week Nine: Chicago Cardinals at New York Giants

| Quarter | 1 | 2 | 3 | 4 | Total |
|---|---|---|---|---|---|
| Cardinals | 0 | 0 | 0 | 0 | 0 |
| Giants | 0 | 0 | 0 | 6 | 6 |

at Polo Grounds, New York, New York

- Date: November 6
- Game attendance: 19,648

Game information

Fourth quarter

- NYG Leemans 5-yard run (kick failed)

=== Week 10: vs. Cleveland Rams ===
Week Ten: Cleveland Rams at New York Giants

| Quarter | 1 | 2 | 3 | 4 | Total |
|---|---|---|---|---|---|
| Rams | 0 | 0 | 0 | 0 | 0 |
| Giants | 7 | 14 | 7 | 0 | 28 |

at Polo Grounds, New York, New York

- Date: November 13
- Game attendance: 25,000

Game information

First quarter

- NYG Karcis 1-yard run (Cuff kick)

Second quarter

- NYG Karcis 1-yard run (Cuff kick)
- NYG Hanken 27-yard pass from Leemans (Richards kick)

Third quarter

- NYG Danowski 31-yard run (Cuff kick)

=== Week 11: vs. Green Bay Packers ===
Week Eleven: Green Bay Packers at New York Giants

| Quarter | 1 | 2 | 3 | 4 | Total |
|---|---|---|---|---|---|
| Packers | 0 | 0 | 3 | 0 | 3 |
| Giants | 0 | 0 | 9 | 6 | 15 |

at Polo Grounds, New York, New York

- Date: November 20
- Game attendance: 48,279

Game information

Third quarter

- NYG Giants tackled Clarke Hinkle in end zone for a Safety
- GB Paul Engebretsen 22-yard FG
- NYG Leemans 75-yard run (Cuff kick)

Fourth quarter

- NYG Mel Hein 50-yard interception return (kick failed)

=== Week 12: at Brooklyn Dodgers ===
Week Twelve: New York Giants at Brooklyn Dodgers

| Quarter | 1 | 2 | 3 | 4 | Total |
|---|---|---|---|---|---|
| Giants | 0 | 0 | 0 | 7 | 7 |
| Dodgers | 7 | 0 | 0 | 0 | 7 |

at Ebbets Field, Brooklyn, New York

- Date: November 24
- Game attendance: 17,400

Game information

First quarter

- BRK Parker 68-yard interception return (Ralph Kercheval kick)

Fourth quarter

- NYG Dale Burnett 7-yard pass from Danowski (Cuff kick)

Ed Danowski's pass to Dale Burnett was the last Giants touchdown on offense on Thanksgiving Day until 2022.

=== Week 13: vs. Washington Redskins ===
Week Thirteen: Washington Redskins at New York Giants

| Quarter | 1 | 2 | 3 | 4 | Total |
|---|---|---|---|---|---|
| Redskins | 0 | 0 | 0 | 0 | 0 |
| Giants | 14 | 0 | 10 | 12 | 36 |

at Polo Grounds, New York, New York

- Date: December 4
- Game attendance: 57,461

Game information

First quarter

- NYG Soar 43-yard run (Cuff kick)
- NYG Karcis run (Cuff kick)

Third quarter

- NYG Cuff 36-yard FG
- NYG Cuff 96-yard interception return (Cuff kick)

Fourth quarter

- NYG Chuck Galatka pass from Leemans (kick failed)
- NYG Galatka 7-yard interception return (kick failed)

The Giants won the Eastern Division in a 36-0 romp of the defending champion Washington Redskins, and a right to play in the championship.

== NFL Championship Game ==
1938 NFL Championship: Green Bay Packers at New York Giants

| Quarter | 1 | 2 | 3 | 4 | Total |
|---|---|---|---|---|---|
| Packers | 0 | 14 | 3 | 0 | 17 |
| Giants | 9 | 7 | 7 | 0 | 23 |

at Polo Grounds, New York, New York

- Date: December 11
- Game attendance: 48,120

Game information

First quarter

- NYG Cuff 14-yard FG. Giants 3-0.
- NYG Leemans 6-yard run (kick failed). Giants 9-0.

Second quarter

- GB Carl Mulleneaux 40-yard pass from Arnie Herber (Engebretsen kick). Giants 9-7.
- NYG Charles Barnard 21-yard pass from Danowski (Cuff kick). Giants 16-7.
- GB Hinkle 1-yard run (Engebretsen kick). Giants 16-14.

Third quarter

- GB Engebretsen 15-yard FG. Packers 17-16.
- NYG Soar 23-yard pass from Danowski (Cuff kick). Giants 23-17.

Fourth quarter

- No scoring plays

Top passers

- GB - Arnie Herber - 5/14, 123 yards, 1 TD
- NYG - Ed Danowski - 7/11, 74 yards, 2 TD

Top rushers

- GB - Charlie Hinkle - 18 rushes, 64 yards, 1 TD
- NYG - Hank Soar - 20 rushes, 68 yards

Top receivers

- GB - Wayland Becker - 2 receptions, 78 yards
- NYG - Hank Soar - 3 receptions, 41 yards, 1 TD

== Roster ==
1938 New York Giants final roster
| Backs: 10 Len Barnum FB/LB; 18 Dale Burnett RB/CB; 14 Ward Cuff RB/CB/K; 22 Ed Danowski RB/CB/S; 28 Nello Falaschi RB/S; 17 Johnny Gildea RB/S; 11 Bull Karcis FB/LB; 4 Tuffy Leemans RB/CB; 13 Kink Richards RB/CB; 20 Leland Shaffer RB/S; 15 Hank Soar FB/LB; 19 Red Wolfe FB/LB | Linemen/Linebackers: 55 Pete Cole G/DG; 36 Frank Cope T/DT; 2 Johnny Dell Isola G/DG; 34 Stan Galazin C/LB; 9 Jack Haden T/DT; 7 Mel Hein C/LB; 31 Larry Johnson C/LB; 5 Kayo Lunday G/DG; 33 John Mellus T/DT; 44 Ox Parry T/DT; 42 Orville Tuttle G/DG; 66 Art White G/DG; 50 Ed Widseth T/DT | Ends/Receivers: 24 Charles Barnard; 29 Chuck Gelatka; 37 Ray Hanken; 21 Jim Lee Howell; 23 Buster Poole; rookies in italics |

== Standings ==
NFL Eastern Division
| | W | L | T | PCT | DIV | PF | PA | STK |
|---|---|---|---|---|---|---|---|---|
| New York Giants | 8 | 2 | 1 | .800 | 5–2–1 | 194 | 79 | W1 |
| Washington Redskins | 6 | 3 | 2 | .667 | 4–2–2 | 148 | 154 | L1 |
| Brooklyn Dodgers | 4 | 4 | 3 | .500 | 3–2–3 | 131 | 161 | T1 |
| Philadelphia Eagles | 5 | 6 | 0 | .455 | 3–5 | 154 | 164 | W2 |
| Pittsburgh Pirates | 2 | 9 | 0 | .182 | 2–6 | 79 | 169 | L6 |

Note: Tie games were not officially counted in the standings until 1972.

== All-Star Game ==
Five weeks after winning the championship, the Giants defeated the NFL All-Stars 13–10 in the first Pro Bowl on January 15, 1939. The game was played at Wrigley Field in Los Angeles, California, where poor weather caused an attendance of just 15,000.

== See also ==
- List of New York Giants seasons
- 1939 National Football League All-Star Game
