= New York Giants all-time roster (A–Kim) =

1,967 players have appeared in at least one regular season or postseason game in the National Football League (NFL) for the New York Giants since 1925. This list includes those whose last names fall between "A" and "Kim". For the rest of the players, see New York Giants all-time roster (Kin–Z). This list is accurate through the end of the 2025 NFL season.

== A ==
- Bobby Abrams
- Ed Adamchik
- Andrew Adams
- George Adams
- Jerell Adams
- Matthew Adams
- O'Neal Adams
- Verlin Adams
- Paulson Adebo
- Ben Agajanian
- Ray Agnew
- Danny Aiken
- Bill Albright
- Steve Alexakos
- Brent Alexander
- Darius Alexander
- Doc Alexander
- John Alexander
- Kevin Alexander
- Brian Alford
- Jay Alford
- Raul Allegre
- Derek Allen
- Ian Allen
- Javorius Allen
- Kenderick Allen
- Matt Allen
- Will Allen
- Neely Allison
- Beau Almodobar
- John Amberg
- Prince Amukamara
- Morten Andersen
- Bob Anderson
- Bruce Anderson
- Cliff Anderson
- Jack Anderson
- Justin Anderson
- Ottis Anderson
- Roger Anderson
- Ryder Anderson
- Winnie Anderson
- Shawn Andrews
- Stacy Andrews
- Eli Apple
- Ben Apuna
- Troy Archer
- Billy Ard
- Jessie Armstead
- Ray-Ray Armstrong
- LaVar Arrington
- Corrie Artman
- Cliff Ashburn
- Pete Athas
- Jess Atkinson
- John Atwood
- Bill Austin
- Marvin Austin
- Chuck Avedisian
- Ken Avery
- Butch Avinger
- Adrian Awasom
- Akeem Ayers
- Robert Ayers

== B ==
- David Baas
- Alex Bachman
- Red Badgro
- Matt Bahr
- Carlton Bailey
- Deandre Baker
- John Baker
- Jon Baker
- Stephen Baker
- Rich Baldinger
- Jake Ballard
- Corey Ballentine
- Gary Ballman
- Carl Banks
- Deonte Banks
- Willie Banks
- Tiki Barber
- Elmer Barbour
- Ramses Barden
- Carl Barisich
- Hub Barker
- Saquon Barkley
- Charles Barnard
- Erich Barnes
- Zaire Barnes
- Len Barnum
- Emmett Barrett
- Micheal Barrow
- Al Barry
- Brad Bars
- Connor Barwin
- Fritz Barzilauskas
- Boogie Basham
- John Bauer
- Mark Bavaro
- Sam Beal
- Willie Beamon
- Jon Beason
- William Beatty
- Darrian Beavers
- Ray Beck
- Odell Beckham Jr.
- Brad Beckman
- Travis Beckum
- Al Bedner
- Keith Beebe
- Earl Beecham
- Larry Beil
- Kevin Belcher (center)
- Gordon Bell
- Jason Bell
- Kay Bell
- Bob Bellinger
- Daniel Bellinger
- Dane Belton
- Heinie Benkert
- Fred Benners
- Lewis Bennett
- Martellus Bennett
- Sean Bennett
- Brad Benson
- George Benyola
- Nat Berhe
- Rocky Bernard
- Jarrick Bernard-Converse
- Wayne Berry
- Bill Berthusen
- Sean Berton
- Art Best
- Antoine Bethea
- Riley Biggs
- Joe Biscaha
- Greg Bishop
- Adam Bisnowaty
- Korie Black
- Mike Black
- Chase Blackburn
- Will Blackmon
- Kory Blackwell
- Cary Blanchard
- Tom Blanchard
- Tony Blazine
- Al Bloodgood
- Tony Blount
- Al Blozis
- Jim Blumenstock
- Ron Blye
- C.J. Board
- Chris Board
- Chris Bober
- Rex Boggan
- Reed Bohovich
- Michael Boley
- Bookie Bolin
- Don Boll
- Curtis Bolton
- Lynn Bomar
- Devontae Booker
- Johnny Bookman
- Kevin Boothe
- John Booty
- Dennis Borcky
- Les Borden
- Kevin Boss
- McKinley Boston
- Jim Bowdoin
- Steve Bowman
- Zack Bowman
- Knuckles Boyle
- Tim Boyle
- Swayze Bozeman
- M. L. Brackett
- James Bradberry
- Beau Brade
- Allen Bradford
- Ahmad Bradshaw
- John Brandes
- Chad Bratzke
- Ben Bredeson
- Matt Breida
- Matt Brennan
- Al Brenner
- Jack Brewer
- James Brewer
- Leon Bright
- Gary Brightwell
- Jasper Brinkley
- Marion Broadstone
- Lorenzo Bromell
- Jay Bromley
- Bobby Brooks
- Michael Brooks
- Fred Broussard
- Andre Brown
- Barry Brown
- Boyd Brown
- Cam Brown
- C. C. Brown
- Charles Brown
- Chykie Brown
- Dave Brown (born 1920)
- Dave Brown (born 1970)
- Derek Brown
- Donald Brown
- Evan Brown
- Gary Brown
- Jamon Brown
- Josh Brown
- Lomas Brown
- Otto Brown
- Ralph Brown
- Roger Brown
- Rosey Brown
- Stevie Brown
- Gregg Browning
- Scott Brunner
- T.J. Brunson
- Bill Bryant
- Matt Bryant
- Deone Bucannon
- Curtis Buckley
- Marcus Buckley
- Terrell Buckley
- Ted Bucklin
- Bart Buetow
- Harry Buffington
- Maury Buford
- Danny Buggs
- Randy Bullock
- Keith Bulluck
- Jarrod Bunch
- Mike Bundra
- Marquis Bundy
- Charlie Burgess
- Terrell Burgess
- Dale Burnett
- Hank Burnine
- Brian Burns
- Curry Burns
- Plaxico Burress
- Jim Burt
- Mike Busch
- Carl Butkus
- James Butler
- Skip Butler
- Vernon Butler
- Rich Buzin
- Ken Byers
- Joseph Byler
- Boris Byrd

== C ==
- Lawrence Cager
- Chris Cagle
- Alan Caldwell
- Bruce Caldwell
- Duke Calhoun
- Austin Calitro
- Len Calligaro
- Chris Calloway
- Dalen Cambre
- Carter Campbell
- Dan Campbell
- Glenn Campbell
- Jesse Campbell
- Parris Campbell
- Billy Campfield
- Phil Cancik
- John Cannady
- John Cannella
- Leo Cantor
- Chris Canty
- Selvish Capers
- Cap Capi
- Roland Caranci
- Art Carney
- John Carney
- Brian Carpenter
- Rob Carpenter
- David Carr
- Henry Carr
- Reggie Carr
- Russ Carroccio
- Jim Carroll
- Vic Carroll
- Harry Carson
- Abdul Carter
- Jonathan Carter
- Lorenzo Carter
- Tim Carter
- Maurice Carthon
- Pete Case
- Jonathan Casillas
- Matt Cavanaugh
- Les Caywood
- Frank Cephous
- Gene Ceppetelli
- Don Chandler
- Karl Chandler
- Sean Chandler
- Ike Charlton
- Clifford Chatman
- Elijah Chatman
- Mike Cherry
- George Cheverko
- John Chickerneo
- O. J. Childress
- Clarence Childs
- Todd Christensen
- Steve Christie
- Mike Ciccolella
- Jim Clack
- Chris Claiborne
- Kendrick Clancy
- Stu Clancy
- Danny Clark
- Jeremy Clark
- Ryan Clark
- Bobby Clatterbuck
- Kaelin Clay
- Randy Clay
- Roy Clay
- Harvey Clayton
- Michael Clayton
- Vince Clements
- Mike Cloud
- Don Clune
- Ray Coates
- R. J. Cobbs
- Ross Cockrell
- Michael Coe
- Junior Coffey
- Randy Coffield
- Barry Cofield
- Adrian Colbert
- Rondy Colbert
- Pete Cole
- Charles Coleman
- Corey Coleman
- Stacy Coley
- Jake Colhouer
- Jim Collier
- Beaux Collins
- Kerry Collins
- Landon Collins
- Mark Collins
- Ray Collins
- Doug Colman
- Jim Colvin
- Greg Comella
- Rudy Comstock
- Glen Condren
- Charlie Conerly
- Ryan Connelly
- John Conner
- Dan Connor
- John Contoulis
- Brett Conway
- Charles Cook
- Johnie Cooks
- Joe Cooper
- Pharoh Cooper
- Frank Cope
- Gus Coppens
- Jashaun Corbin
- Lou Cordileone
- Jim Cordle
- Cody Core
- Chuck Corgan
- José Cortéz
- Red Corzine
- Tom Costello
- Vince Costello
- Carter Coughlin
- Tex Coulter
- Johnny Counts
- Terry Cousin
- Brad Cousino
- Jaime Covington
- Greg Cox
- Michael Cox
- Dennis Crane
- Bill Crawford
- Ed Crawford
- Keith Crawford
- Bobby Crespino
- Chuck Crist
- Jim Crocicchia
- Mike Croel
- Mason Crosby
- Steve Crosby
- Howard Cross
- Keion Crossen
- Lindon Crow
- Tae Crowder
- Tommy Crutcher
- Victor Cruz
- Larry Csonka
- Ward Cuff
- Jim Culbreath
- Mack Cummings
- Jerome Cunningham
- Korey Cunningham
- Bill Currier

== D ==
- Carson Dach
- Craig Dahl
- Brad Daluiso
- Frank Damiani
- Joe Danelo
- Kenny Daniel
- Torrance Daniels
- Ed Danowski
- Orleans Darkwa
- Jaxson Dart
- DJ Davidson
- James Davidson
- Zach Davidson
- Chris Davis
- Don Davis
- Gaines Davis
- Geremy Davis
- Henry Davis
- Jarrad Davis
- Jawill Davis
- Kelvin Davis
- Paul Davis
- Roger Davis
- Rosey Davis
- Russell Davis
- Scott Davis
- Tae Davis
- Thabiti Davis
- Tyrone Davis
- Wyatt Davis
- Joe Dawkins
- Lawrence Dawsey
- Ron Dayne
- Randy Dean
- Donte Deayon
- Lou DeFilippo
- Jim Del Gaizo
- Johnny Dell Isola
- Curtis DeLoatch
- Quintin Demps
- Will Demps
- Darqueze Dennard
- Jerry Dennerlein
- Vince Dennery
- Mike Dennis
- Steve DeOssie
- Zak DeOssie
- Al DeRogatis
- Dan DeRose
- Darrell Dess
- Tommy DeVito
- Garrett Dickerson
- David Diehl
- Phillip Dillard
- Stacey Dillard
- Victor Dimukeje
- Darnell Dinkins
- Fred DiRenzo
- Robert DiRico
- Al Dixon
- Brandon Dixon
- Riley Dixon
- Ron Dixon
- Zachary Dixon
- Bob Dobelstein
- Kevin Dockery
- Matt Dodge
- Larry Donnell
- Jack Doolan
- Dan Doornink
- Derek Dorris
- Eric Dorsey
- Dewayne Douglas
- John Douglas
- Omar Douglas
- Robert Douglas
- Maurice Douglass
- Eddie Dove
- Devante Downs
- Gary Downs
- Marcus Dowtin
- Reuben Droughns
- Fred Dryer
- Tom Dublinski
- Maury Dubofsky
- Walt Dubzinski
- Mark Duckens
- Damane Duckett
- Dick Duden
- Paul Dudley
- Dave Duerson
- Jamal Duff
- Bill Dugan
- Len Dugan
- Gil Duggan
- Bobby Duhon
- Greg Dulcich
- Dave Dunaway
- Jim Duncan
- Bob Dunlap
- Cory Durden
- Rick Dvorak

== E ==
- Ed Eagan
- Kay Eakin
- Lou Eaton
- Scott Eaton
- Nate Ebner
- Keith Eck
- Ox Eckhardt
- Floyd Eddings
- Antonio Edwards
- Ben Edwards
- Mario Edwards Jr.
- Monk Edwards
- Steve Edwards
- Keith Elias
- Ukeme Eligwe
- Bill Ellenbogen
- Jumbo Elliott
- Justin Ellis
- Mark Ellison
- Rhett Ellison
- Percy Ellsworth
- Jermaine Eluemunor
- Carlos Emmons
- Dick Enderle
- Derek Engler
- Evan Engram
- Bobby Epps
- Bill Erickson
- Len Eshmont
- Don Ettinger
- Charlie Evans
- Joshua Ezeudu

== F ==
- Kyler Fackrell
- Art Faircloth
- Nello Falaschi
- Terry Falcon
- Jeff Feagles
- Tiny Feather
- Jay Feely
- Jon Feliciano
- Daniel Fells
- Eric Felton
- Carl Fennema
- Chandler Fenner
- Frank Ferrara
- Thomas Fidone
- Joe Fields
- Frank Filchock
- Jim Files
- Steve Filipowicz
- Gene Filipski
- Jim Finn
- Clete Fischer
- Mike Fitzgerald
- Pat Flaherty
- Ray Flaherty
- Demetrius Flannigan-Fowles
- Cameron Fleming
- Mack Flenniken
- Cordale Flott
- Ereck Flowers
- Larry Flowers
- Richmond Flowers
- D. J. Fluker
- Tom Flynn
- Mark Flythe
- Chris Foote
- Charlie Ford
- Bryce Ford-Wheaton
- Jay Foreman
- Ike Forte
- Bennie Fowler
- Dan Fowler
- Dan Fox
- Mike Fox
- Sam Fox
- Tomon Fox
- George Franck
- Ike Frankian
- Terrence Frederick
- Tucker Frederickson
- Devonta Freeman
- Lorenzo Freeman
- Mike Friede
- Benny Friedman
- Byron Frisch
- Jake Fromm
- Jim Frugone
- John Fuqua

== G ==
- Bob Gaiters
- Stan Galazin
- Tony Galbreath
- Arnold Galiffa
- Dave Gallagher
- Wayne Gallman
- Scott Galyon
- Graham Gano
- Elijah Garcia
- Jim Garcia
- Bob Garner
- Sam Garnes
- Alvin Garrett
- Curtis Garrett
- Jason Garrett
- Art Garvey
- Mike Garzoni
- Nick Gates
- Tom Gatewood
- Rashaan Gaulden
- Bruce Gehrke
- Chuck Gelatka
- Adam Gettis
- Mike Gibbons
- Robert Giblin
- Butch Gibson
- Frank Gifford
- Zyon Gilbert
- Johnny Gildea
- Jamie Gillan
- Cullen Gillaspia
- Walker Gillette
- Xavier Gipson
- Chet Gladchuk
- Chip Glass
- Vencie Glenn
- Mike Glennon
- Rich Glover
- Mark Glowinski
- Chris Godfrey
- Jonathan Goff
- Pete Gogolak
- Dan Goich
- Jack Golden
- Markus Golden
- Wendell Goldsmith
- Kenny Golladay
- Jerry Golsteyn
- Chauncey Golston
- Conrad Goode
- Stephen Goodin
- B. J. Goodson
- Tod Goodwin
- Pete Gorgone
- Robbie Gould
- Paul Governali
- Scott Gragg
- Kent Graham
- Shayne Graham
- Sonny Grandelius
- Curtis Grant
- Deon Grant
- Len Grant
- Carl Grate
- Gordon Gravelle
- Carlton Gray
- Earnest Gray
- Eric Gray
- John Greco
- Art Green
- Barrett Green
- Joe Green
- Ray Green
- Tony Green
- A.J. Greene
- Bob Greenhalgh
- Jack Gregory
- Nick Greisen
- Rosey Grier
- Cornelius Griffin
- Glynn Griffing
- Forrest Griffith
- Tex Grigg
- Bob Grim
- Andy Gross
- Lee Grosscup
- Neal Guggemos
- Ralph Guglielmi
- Jimmy Gunn
- Albert Gursky
- Buzz Guy
- Louis Guy
- Joe Guyon
- Myron Guyton

== H ==
- Matt Haack
- Andy Haase
- Bill Hachten
- Wayne Haddix
- Jack Haden
- Derek Hagan
- Jack Hagerty
- Hinkey Haines
- Ali Haji-Sheikh
- Jon Halapio
- Ryan Hale
- Grant Haley
- Alex Hall
- Harold Hall
- John Hall
- Leon Hall
- Pete Hall
- Antonio Hamilton
- Conrad Hamilton
- Devery Hamilton
- Keith Hamilton
- Woodrow Hamilton
- Bobby Hammond
- Rodney Hampton
- Norman Hand
- Ray Hanken
- Johnathan Hankins
- Herb Hannah
- Dick Hanson
- Merle Hapes
- Dee Hardison
- Cecil Hare
- Sean Harlow
- Art Harms
- Charlie Harper
- LaSalle Harper
- Madre Harper
- Gary Harrell
- Don Harris
- Dwayne Harris
- Johnnie Harris
- Mike Harris
- Nigel Harris
- Phil Harris
- Robert Harris
- Trent Harris
- Wendell Harris
- Damon Harrison
- Max Harrison
- Bobby Hart
- Harold Hart
- Montre Hartage
- Bug Hartzog
- George Hasenohrl
- Don Hasselbeck
- Tim Hasselbeck
- Jeff Hatch
- Dave Hathcock
- Art Hauser
- Tre Hawkins
- Larry Hayes
- Mark Haynes
- Paul Hazel
- Matt Hazeltine
- Andy Headen
- Joe Heap
- Larry Heater
- Bud Hebert
- Ralph Heck
- Madison Hedgecock
- Jack Heflin
- Mel Hein
- Don Heinrich
- Quadree Henderson
- Dutch Hendrian
- Dwayne Hendricks
- Pete Henry
- Steve Henry
- Dick Hensley
- Arnie Herber
- Johnny Hermann
- Will Hernandez
- Don Herrmann
- Mark Herzlich
- Neville Hewitt
- Ray Hickl
- Eddie Hicks
- John Hicks
- Ed Hiemstra
- B.J. Hill
- Cowboy Hill
- John Hill
- Kenny Hill
- Kid Hill
- Ralph Hill
- Will Hill
- Jerry Hillebrand
- Ike Hilliard
- Jason Hilliard
- Justin Hilliard
- Jon Hilliman
- Peyton Hillis
- Hal Hilpirt
- Roy Hilton
- Jack Hinkle
- Chuck Hinton
- Domenik Hixon
- Merwin Hodel
- Isaiah Hodgins
- Mike Hogan
- Paul Hogan
- Colin Holba
- Jim Holifield
- Jevon Holland
- Vernon Holland
- Justin Hollins
- T. J. Hollowell
- John Holman
- Darnay Holmes
- Jaret Holmes
- Kenny Holmes
- Bernard Holsey
- Johnny Holton
- Tam Hopkins
- Mike Horan
- Dick Horne
- Timmy Horne
- Sam Horner
- Ron Hornsby
- Jayron Hosley
- Jeff Hostetler
- Rich Houston
- Junie Hovious
- Anthony Howard
- Dosey Howard
- Erik Howard
- Red Howard
- Jim Lee Howell
- Lane Howell
- Cal Hubbard
- Chris Hubbard
- Bob Hudson
- Bryan Hudson
- James Hudson
- Tanner Hudson
- Sam Huff
- Ed Hughes
- Ernie Hughes
- Montori Hughes
- Pat Hughes
- Lil'Jordan Humphrey
- Byron Hunt
- George Hunt
- Michael Hunter
- Bill Hutchinson
- Ralph Hutchinson
- Gerry Huth
- Jalin Hyatt
- Bob Hyland
- Henry Hynoski

== I ==
- Tut Imlay
- Mark Ingram Sr.
- Tex Irvin
- Duke Iversen

== J ==
- Adoree' Jackson
- Alonzo Jackson
- Bob Jackson
- Brian Jackson
- Cleveland Jackson
- Deon Jackson
- Greg Jackson
- Honor Jackson
- Louis Jackson
- Mark Jackson
- Terry Jackson
- Tyree Jackson
- Allen Jacobs
- Brandon Jacobs
- Proverb Jacobs
- Tramain Jacobs
- Larry Jacobson
- Charles James
- Dick James
- Richie James
- Chuck Janerette
- Paul Jappe
- Tony Jefferson
- Jon Jelacic
- Cullen Jenkins
- Ed Jenkins
- Izel Jenkins
- Janoris Jenkins
- John Jenkins
- Dave Jennings
- Michael Jennings
- Rashad Jennings
- Jerrel Jernigan
- John Jerry
- Gary Jeter
- Dwayne Jiles
- Anthony Johnson
- Austin Johnson
- Bill Johnson
- Bobby Johnson
- Bruce Johnson
- Collin Johnson
- Curley Johnson
- D. J. Johnson
- Damian Johnson
- Darcy Johnson
- Dennis Johnson
- Dwight Johnson
- Dyontae Johnson
- Gartrell Johnson
- Gene Johnson
- Herb Johnson
- Jakob Johnson
- Joe Johnson
- John Johnson
- Ken Johnson
- Larry Johnson
- Len Johnson
- LeShon Johnson
- Marcus Johnson
- Michael Johnson
- Nate Johnson
- Nico Johnson
- Patrick Johnson
- Pepper Johnson
- Randy Johnson
- Raymond Johnson
- Ron Johnson
- Theo Johnson
- Brian Johnston
- Cameron Johnston
- Bob Jones
- Brett Jones
- Cedric Jones
- Chris Jones
- Clarence Jones
- Daniel Jones
- Daryl Jones
- Dhani Jones
- Ernie Jones
- Greg Jones
- Homer Jones
- Mark Jones
- Nic Jones
- Potsy Jones
- Robbie Jones
- T. J. Jones
- Taiwan Jones
- David Jordan
- Mike Jordan
- Greg Joseph
- Linval Joseph
- William Joseph
- Delvin Joyce
- Trey Junkin
- Joe Jurevicius

== Ka-Kim ==
- Vyto Kab
- Herb Kane
- Danny Kanell
- Jim Kanicki
- Bernie Kaplan
- John Karcis
- Carl Karilivacz
- Jim Katcavage
- Duce Keahey
- Tom Kearns
- Bryan Kehl
- Brian Kelley
- Derrick Kelly II
- Ellison Kelly
- Lewis Kelly
- Shipwreck Kelly
- Jim Kendrick
- Devon Kennard
- George Kennard
- Jimmy Kennedy
- Tom Kennedy
- William C. Kenyon
- George Kershaw
- Ken Keuper
- Charlie Killett
- Glenn Killinger
- Bruce Kimball
- Bill Kimber
- Jerry Kimmel
