= History of the New York Giants (1925–1978) =

New York Giants primary logo 1956–1960.

The history of the New York Giants from 1925 to 1978 covers the American football franchise from the team's inception until the conclusion of their tumultuous 1978 season. Currently members of the NFL's National Football Conference, the Giants were founded in 1925 by original owner Tim Mara in the then five-year-old NFL. Mara gave control of the team over to his two sons—Wellington and Jack—early in their lives. During this period in their history the Giants acquired four NFL championships, but also suffered some down times, including consecutive non-playoff seasons from 1964 to 1978.

In just its third season, the team finished with the best record in the league at 11–1–1 and was awarded the NFL title. In a 14-year span from 1933 to 1946, New York qualified to play in the NFL championship game eight times, winning twice. They did not win another league title until 1956, aided by a number of future Pro Football Hall of Fame players such as running back Frank Gifford, linebacker Sam Huff, and offensive tackle Roosevelt Brown. The Giants 1956 Championship team not only comprised players who would eventually find their way to the Pro Football Hall of Fame, but it also had a Hall of Fame coaching staff. Head coach Jim Lee Howell's staff had Vince Lombardi coaching the offense and Tom Landry coaching the defense. From 1958 to 1963, New York played in the NFL championship game five out of those six years, but failed to win. The 1958 NFL Championship game, in which they lost 23–17 in overtime to the Baltimore Colts, is credited with increasing the popularity of the NFL in the United States.

From 1964 to 1978, the Giants registered just two winning seasons and were unable to advance to the playoffs. During this period the team also traded away quarterback Fran Tarkenton, who would later lead the Minnesota Vikings to three Super Bowls and end up in the Hall of Fame. This period was characterized by the front office's bad decisions in the college draft, several ill-advised trades, and the team's fans' growing disappointment. It was not until the 1980s that the Giants would develop a consistent playoff team.

== Birth and success: 1925–1930 ==
In 1925, the NFL was in need of a franchise in a large city market that could be used to showcase the league. To achieve this, NFL President, Joseph Carr traveled to New York City to offer boxing promoter Billy Gibson, a franchise. Gibson was chosen by Carr since he had owned the league's last New York franchise, the New York Brickley Giants, in 1921. However, Gibson refused the offer for a new franchise, but he did refer Carr to a friend of his, Tim Mara. Mara, a bookmaker (then a legal profession), businessman, and promoter, with an investment of US$500, then established the modern-day New York Giants franchise. Other than the name, there is no relation between the Brickley Giants and the modern New York Giants franchise. Mara decided to invest the $500 in the Giants as opposed to heavyweight boxer Gene Tunney in a spur-of-the-moment decision, and started the team with the statement, "an exclusive franchise for anything in New York is worth $500." Mara owned the team until his death in 1959, when it was passed on to his sons Wellington and Jack Mara. Legally named "New York Football Giants" to distinguish themselves from the baseball team of the same name, the Giants played their first game, an exhibition, against the independent All New Britain team in New Britain, Connecticut, on October 4, 1925. They defeated New Britain 26–0 in front of a crowd of 10,000.

The Giants' first regular season NFL game took place a week later, on October 11, 1925, in a 0 to 14 loss against the Providence Steam Roller.

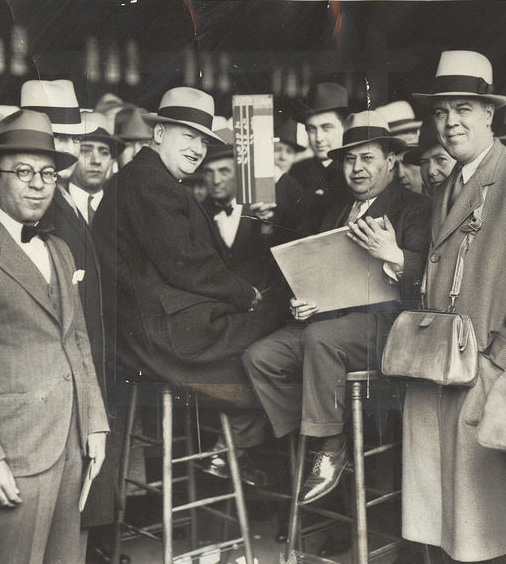
Tim Mara (seated on the left) pictured at the track. Before Mara founded the Giants, he worked as a bookmaker, a profession which was legal in 1925

Mara soon realized that his purchase of the team did not yield a home field nor any players, coaches, or equipment. Harry March, who was part of the group that convinced Mara to buy the team from the league, helped him establish the team by taking a job as the team's secretary. March guiding him through the team's early years, handling the personnel decisions. Mara rented the Polo Grounds as the team's stadium, and March developed a strategy that hinged on acquiring college stars such as Jim Thorpe. At 37 years old, Thorpe was a shadow of his former self, and although he signed with the team, his contract required that he only play parts of games during the early portion of the season, until he got into shape, at which point he would play full games. He played only the first regular season game however, before ending his Giants career due to injury. His absence would severely hurt the team's monetary outlook for the season.

Although the Giants were successful on the field in their first season, going 8–4–0 in 1925, their financial status was a different story. The players' salaries were so low that they could not fully dedicate themselves to the game as most of them had to work other jobs. The team's abbreviated practices, held at 4:30 PM each day so as not to conflict with work schedules, also allowed for little in-season improvement. Overshadowed by baseball, boxing, and college football, professional football was not a popular sport in 1925. Mara had to spend $25,000 of his own money during the season just to keep the franchise alive. This struggle continued until the 11th game of the season when Red Grange and the Chicago Bears came to town, attracting more than 73,000 fans—a pro football record. The game attracted such attention that 20,000 fans were turned away at the gates. This gave the Giants a much needed influx of revenue, and perhaps altered the history of the franchise.

New York went 8–4–1 in 1926, and withstood a challenge from an upstart American football league led by a team featuring Grange. Grange and his agent had formed the American Football League and placed their flagship team, the Yankees, in New York. Grange's agent, C.C. Pyle, had tried to get the franchise admitted into the NFL using Yankee Stadium but was blocked by Mara, who asserted his territorial rights clause. Angered, Pyle swore revenge, saying "I am now ready to put the National Football League, and Mr. Mara out of business." According to a story published by The New York Times in December 1926, the Giants lost over $50,000 during the season. Grange's league lasted one season however, and was subsumed into the NFL. Grange went back to playing for the Bears before the 1928 season, and the Yankees folded a year later.

The Giants had a very successful season in 1927, finishing 11–1–1. Mara had instructed March to spend freely to acquire talent, and he signed Cal Hubbard, a 6'5" 245 lb. two-way end, who had led small Geneva College to a victory over then-powerful Harvard the previous year. Led by team captain, defensive tackle Steve Owen, they held their opponents to 20 points on the season, with their league best defense posting 10 shutouts in 13 games. On offense, they were led by halfback Jack McBride, whose 57 points led the league in scoring, and his versatile backfield partner Hinkey Haines. New coach Earl Potteiger led the team into a game against the Chicago Bears late in the season with first place on the line. New York won 13–7 in what Owen called, "the toughest, roughest football game I ever played." From then on it was an easy trip to the championship, as they had a 2-game lead over the Bears by virtue of their head to head tiebreaker (note: the championship was determined by record in that era; it was not until 1933 that the NFL had a championship game).

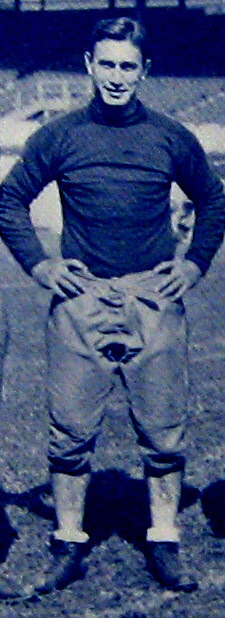
Benny Friedman with the Giants in 1929

Despite solid performances by linemen Hubbard and Steve Owen, New York finished a disappointing 4–7–2 in 1928. Following the season, the team released 18 players and Potteiger was fired and replaced by LeRoy Andrews. Before the 1929 season Mara purchased the entire squad of the Detroit Wolverines, including star quarterback Benny Friedman, a team which had finished in third place the year before. The rosters of the two teams were combined under the Giants name and this led to immediate improvement as the Giants record soared to 13–1–1 in 1929. Friedman's arrival in particular boosted tickets sales and fan interest, which more than covered the expense of his high salary ($10,000). However, their only loss was a 20–6 defeat in November to the Green Bay Packers who by virtue of this win, and their 12–0–1 record, won the NFL title. That Packers team featured Hubbard who Green Bay had bought from New York after he expressed a desire to play there. Before the season, Mara had transferred ownership of the team over to his two sons to insulate the team from creditors, and during the season the team added star Army halfback Red Cagle whose drawing power helped the team's financials, but whose performance did little to aid their on-field product.

In 1930, there were still many who questioned the quality of the professional game, claiming the college "amateurs" played with more intensity. In December 1930, the Giants played a team of Notre Dame All Stars at the Polo Grounds to raise money for the unemployed of New York City. It was also an opportunity to establish the superiority of the pro game. Knute Rockne reassembled his Four Horsemen along with the stars of his 1930 Championship squad and told them to score early, then defend. Rockne, like much of the public, thought little of pro football and expected an easy win. But from the beginning it was a one way contest, with Friedman running for two Giant touchdowns and Hap Moran passing for another. Notre Dame failed to score, and New York played its backups in the second half. When it was all over, Coach Rockne told his team, "That was the greatest football machine I ever saw. I am glad none of you got hurt." The game raised $115,183 for the homeless, and is often credited with establishing the legitimacy of the professional game.

== Steve Owen era: 1931–1953 ==
Following the 1930 season, Friedman retired to become an assistant coach at Yale, and the team hired lineman Steve Owen as the team's new head coach. Owen worked for Mara as a supervisor in his Harlem River area coalyard in the offseason. Mara said that his leaderships skills displayed in that job earned him the top position. Owen was decidedly blue collar; he grew up on a farm in Oklahoma where he was raised by a "prairie schoolmarm and a Cherokee strip farmer", and spent his summer vacations in high school working as a roughneck in a Burkburnett, Texas oil field. An accomplished player who was noted for his toughness and physical strength, Owen had to learn on the job as a head coach. He became an innovator who was responsible for introducing the A formation on offense, and the Umbrella defense, the latter of which helped the team control several high power passers during his tenure.

=== Pre–World War II era: 1931–1940 ===
Friedman was lured back halfway through the 1931 season, and, but the Giants struggled the next two seasons, finishing with a combined record of 11–12–3. They rebounded in 1933 finishing 11–3, and narrowly losing to the Chicago Bears 23–21 in the championship game. New York's resurgence was led by some of the league's best linemen, such as Ray Flaherty, and future Hall of Famers Red Badgro, and Mel Hein. Hein, the team's center, was acquired in 1931, and also played the linebacker position. He would go on to a fifteen-year NFL career in which, as a center, he became an All-NFL first team selection eight times, and the only offensive lineman ever named league MVP. They also were aided by strong seasons from halfbacks Ken Strong, whose 64 points paced the team, and Kink Richards who averaged 6.8 yards per carry on the season.

The Giants started 1–5–1 in 1932, leading Owen to re-enlist McBride, who had been recently released by the Brooklyn Dodgers for lax practice habits, as the team's starting quarterback. McBride restored them to respectability by leading the team to a 3–1–1 finish that season. Before the 1933 season the team acquired University of Michigan All-American quarterback Harry Newman, and versatile free agent halfback Ken Strong. The Giants finished 11–3, first in the new "Eastern Division", and Newman, Hein, and Badgro were named first team All-NFL. Newman led the NFL in passes completed (53), passing yards (973), touchdown passes (11), and longest pass completion (78 yards), with his passing yards total setting an NFL record. They advanced to play the league's first championship game in Chicago's Wrigley Field versus the Bears.

The game was the teams' third meeting of the season. The Bears won the first one, 14–10, and the Giants the second, 3–0. Both teams used several trick plays, and the contest was described at the time as "probably the most spectacular game of the year" and "a brilliant display of offensive power" by the Associated Press. The Bears won 23–21 via a successful hook and ladder play with under two minutes remaining in a game which had six lead changes. Badgro scored the first touchdown in NFL Championship Game history on a 29-yard pass reception from Newman in the second quarter.

The core of New York's 1933 team returned intact in 1934 and they added talented quarterback Ed Danowski who had played collegiately at Fordham the previous year. Owen played Danowski sparingly, ignoring chants from the spectators for the quarterback. The New York fan base consisted of many Long Islanders and Fordham graduates who were eager to see Danowski play. Newman carried the ball a then-record 39 times in a 17–3 victory against Green Bay, but suffered a severe injury to his back in a late season game against Chicago, and his backup, Stu Clancy, was still out due to an elbow injury from a mid-season game. Because of these injuries, Danowski, by default, became the team's starting quarterback. The team finished 8–5, which placed them first in the Eastern Division. Without Newman, Clancy, and Badgro—who was also out due to injury—Owen knew the team was undermanned going into the playoffs, but said "I know it doesn't look good, but we'll give 'em a battle."

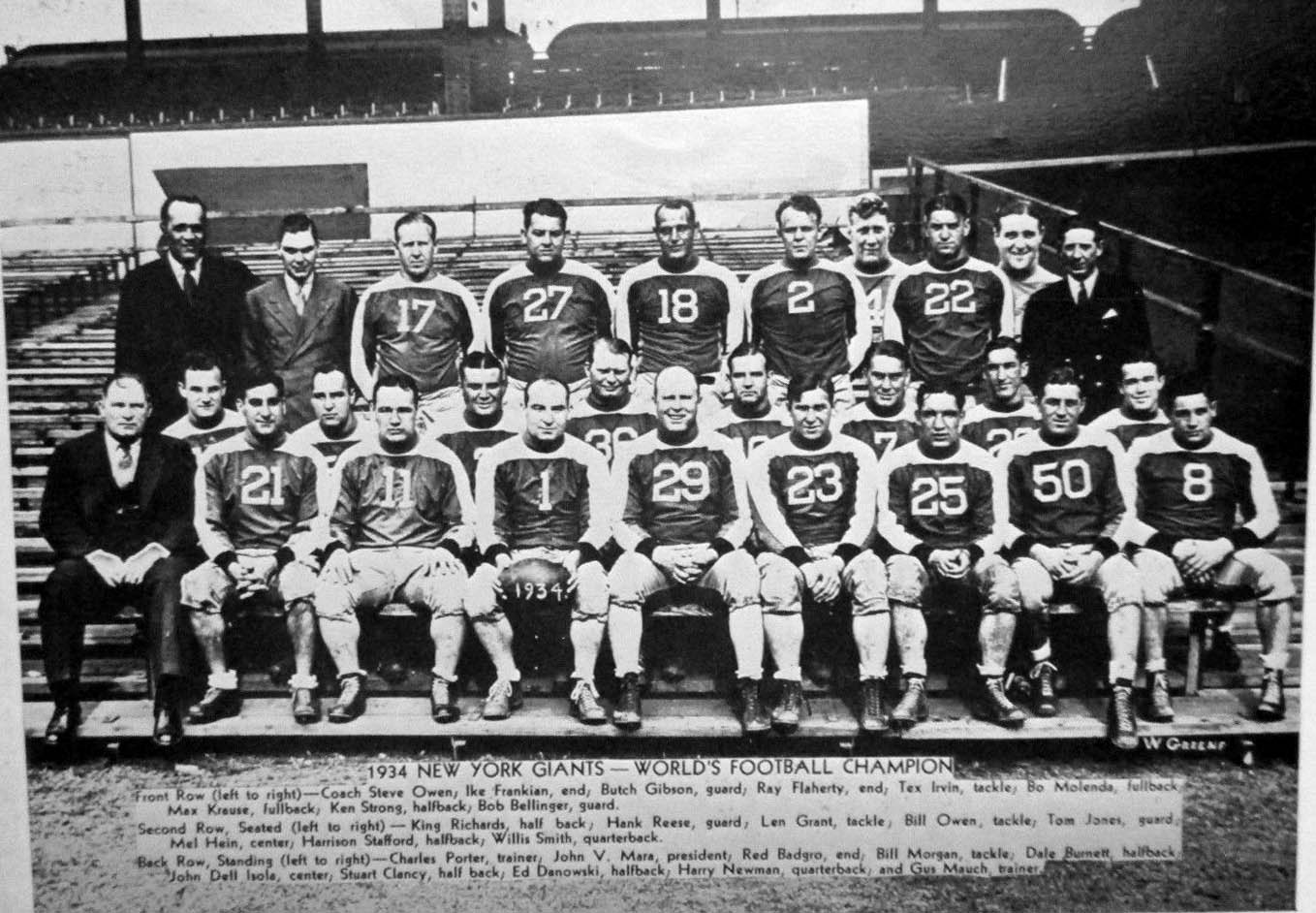
The 1934 NY Giants team.

Although they signed McBride, who had spent the 1934 season playing on a semi-pro team, before the game, the Western Division champion Bears were still 2½–1 favorites. The Giants defeated the previously unbeaten Bears, however, 30–13 at the Polo Grounds on an icy field with temperatures peaking at 25 degrees. Before the game, team treasurer John Mara talked with Owen and captain Ray Flaherty about the frozen field conditions. Flaherty suggested the Giants wear sneakers on the frozen field, as he had played in a game under similar circumstances at Gonzaga and the sneakers proved to be effective. Mara dispatched equipment manager Abe Cohen to get as many sneakers as he could get. Due to traffic and the inability to find any athletic goods stores open on Sunday, Cohen was unable to return before the game started and New York, wearing conventional footwear, trailed 10–3 at the end of the first half. Realizing time was short, Cohen went to Manhattan College—where he had a key to the equipment and locker rooms—and returned to the Polo Grounds at halftime with nine pairs of basketball sneakers, saying that "nine pairs was all I could get." Players donned the sneakers and the Giants, after allowing the Bears another field goal late in the third period, responded with 27 unanswered points in the fourth quarter to win their first NFL Championship game. When they took the lead 17–13 on a touchdown run by Strong, the game had to be stopped because hundreds of fans ran onto the field to celebrate. The game would come to be known as "The Sneakers Game", and the 27 points the Giants scored in the fourth quarter set a single-quarter championship game scoring record that stood for decades. Fans converged on the field after the game, tearing down one of the goal posts. After the game offensive tackle Len Grant expressed his gratitude, saying "God bless Abe Cohen." Oddly, the team's performance was also aided by the consumption of alcohol. The team's trainer felt that whiskey could warm the players up, and he put some into their paper cups. Strong scored a touchdown on the next play, and the trainer did the same thing on the next drive, which again ended in a touchdown. Fearing drunkenness, water was returned to their cups once the team had the lead.

Before the 1935 season the NFL's roster limit was increased from 20 to 24 players. The Giants filled the extra spots with players such as end Tod Goodwin, who played for coach Greasy Neale at West Virginia University the previous season, and running back Leland Shaffer, another rookie, this time out of Kansas State. Newman retired rather than come back from his back injury when the team refused to raise his salary. Goodwin led the league in receptions (26) and yards per catch (16.6), while finishing second behind the Boston Redskins Charley Malone in receiving yards (433–432), and Danowski led the league in passing yards, passes attempted, and passes completed. They were unable to repeat as champions however, as they fell to the Lions 26–7 in the NFL Championship game. Goodwin was knocked out for the game with two broken ribs early in the first quarter. The Lions staked a 13–0 lead before the Giants were able to cut the deficit to 13–7 in the third quarter. The Lions defense helped their team score two late touchdowns with a blocked punt and an interception to give them the win.

By 1935 19‑year‑old Wellington had become the team's secretary, and he started to exert influence over personnel decisions. Wellington was a fan of George Washington University's Alphonse "Tuffy" Leemans, and he selected the obscure running back in the second round of the NFL's first draft in 1936. Leemans led the league in rushing with 830 yards, and posted 118 in the second half of a come-from-behind victory against the Chicago Cardinals. Hubbard came out of retirement to help the team's line towards the end of the season, but despite his solid performance, the Giants finished 5–6–1, losing out on a chance to win the Eastern Division when they lost to eventual Division champion Boston in the final game of the season.

The Giants were very successful from the latter half of the 1930s until the United States entry into World War II. According to one publication, "[f]rom 1936 to 1941 the New York Giants annually fielded a collection of NFL all-stars." Danowski led the league in passing in 1935 and 1936. They added their third NFL championship in 1938 with a 23–17 win over the Green Bay Packers in front of over 48,000 fans at the Polo Grounds. The game was a close one with New York having ridden two blocked Green Bay punts to an early lead, before the Packers came back to take a 17–16 lead. In the fourth quarter however, Danowski threw a 23–yard touchdown pass to Hank Soar, and the defense held the lead to give the Giants their third NFL championship.

The Giants made the championship game again the following year, losing to the Packers in a rematch 27–0.

=== World War II era: 1941–1944 ===
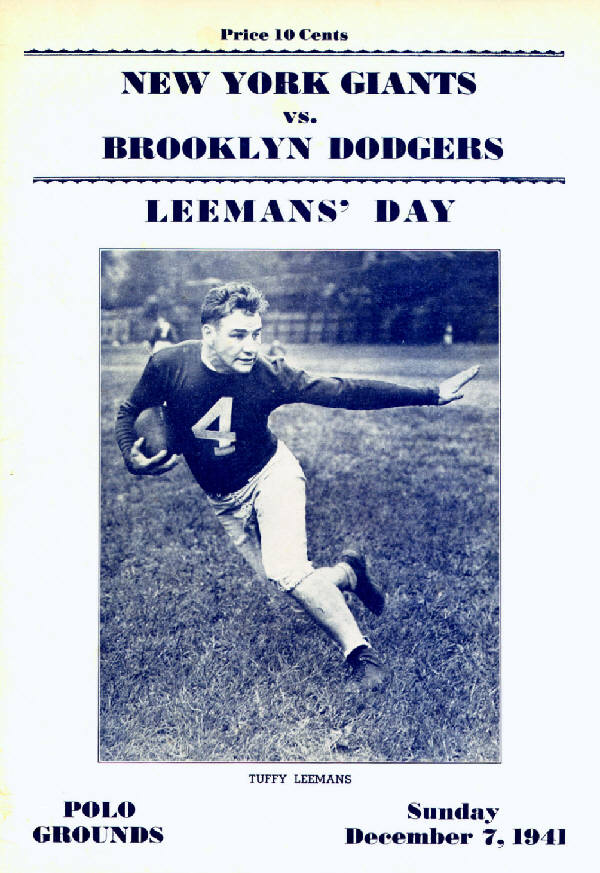
The game program for the Giants December 7, 1941, game versus the Brooklyn Dodgers in which they honored Alphonse "Tuffy" Leemans. Fans and players in attendance were not informed of the Japanese attack on Pearl Harbor until the conclusion of the game.

They finished 8–3 in 1941, and held a ceremony to honor the future Hall of Famer Leemans in the final regular season game on December 7, 1941. Leemans had been with the Giants since 1936, when he led the league in rushing as a rookie with 830 yards. A versatile performer, he rushed for over 3,000 yards, and passed for over 2,300 in his career. During the course of the game the stadium announcer paged Colonel William Joseph Donovan to answer a call from Washington, D.C., and told all servicemen to return to their units, but it was only when the game concluded that players and spectators learned of the attack on the naval base at Pearl Harbor earlier that day. New York advanced to the championship game following the season, in which they lost to the Bears 37–9. Both the 1940 and 1941 championship games were close early before their respective opponents went on an offensive surge to break the games open late. In 1942 and 1943, the Giants totalled an 11–8–2 record and failed to make the postseason.

In 1944, led by standout halfback Bill Paschal, whose 737 rushing yards and 54 points led the team, the Giants reached the championship game where they faced the Green Bay Packers for the third time in 10 seasons. They lost again, this time 14–7 as Ted Fritsch scored two touchdowns and the Packers defense was able to hold on to the lead despite a fourth-quarter touchdown by the Giants.

Notable in this era was a game against the Detroit Lions on November 7, 1943, which ended in a scoreless tie, the last NFL game ever played to end this way. The defensive unit of the 1944 Giants team is ranked #1 of all time in NFL history, giving up only 7.5 points per game – a record that stands to this day.

=== Post World War II era: 1945–1953 ===
By 1946, Mara had given over complete control of the team to his two sons. Jack, the older son, controlled the business aspects, while Wellington controlled the on-field operations. NBC televised the Giants game versus the Green Bay Packers on September 20, 1946,—the first televised game in league history. The Giants advanced to their eighth championship game in fourteen seasons, where they were beaten by the Sid Luckman led Bears 24–14.

Before the 1948 season, New York signed defensive back Emlen Tunnell, who became the first African American player in team history, and who would later become the first African American inducted into the Hall of Fame. They struggled from 1947 to 1949, never finishing above .500, but came back with a solid 10–2 record in 1950. However, they lost to the Cleveland Browns, whom they had beaten twice in the regular season, 8–3 in the 1950 divisional playoff game. In 1949, halfback Gene "Choo-Choo" Roberts scored a league high 17 touchdowns, and in 1950 he set a team record that would stand for over 50 years, when he rushed for 218 yards on November 12.

During this period quarterback Charlie Conerly emerged. Conerly was the team's starting quarterback from 1948 to 1960, and had a franchise-record string of 12 consecutive seasons in which he led the team in passing. A former US Marine, Conerly was renowned among his teammates for his toughness. "There was a time my rookie year when I really saw it", recalled running back Frank Gifford. "He broke his nose really badly, they literally called a timeout and then they called another one while they stopped the bleeding, they stuck stuff up there until it would stop bleeding. You try to get them to do that today. They'd be yelling, 'Get my agent!'". In 1951, the Giants finished 9–2–1, but their inability to beat division rival Cleveland cost them an opportunity to play in the Championship Game. Fullback Eddie Price led the league in rushing and set a league record for rushing attempts in a season, and defensive linemen Arnie Weinmeister and Al DeRogatis, linebacker Jon Baker, and offensive tackle Tex Coulter all made the All-Pro team. The following year New York fell to 7–5, but Tunnell continued to impress. "Tunnell returned interceptions, punts, and kickoffs with such electric flair that he actually outgained the league rushing leader in yards gained" according to one publication. Tunnell amassed 924 yards, while never lining up on offense, whereas the league rushing leader totalled 894. The Giants offense struggled in 1953, and they fell to a 3–9 record. Gifford was forced to play both ways due to a depleted roster, and in the second to last game of the season they lost 62–14 to division rival Cleveland.

== Jim Lee Howell and the Hall of Famers: 1954–1958 ==
Following the 1953 season, an important transition in Giants history occurred. Steve Owen was fired by Wellington and Jack Mara, and replaced by Jim Lee Howell. Owen had coached the Giants for 23 seasons, and compiled a 153–108–17 record. He is credited with introducing several innovations to football, including inventing the "Umbrella defense", which was the first to use four defensive backs. Wellington, who was beginning to take a more active role in the team by this period, later described the move by calling it "the hardest decision I'd ever made". The change would have a profound impact on Gifford. A multi-talented player who could run, catch, and throw, Gifford was a star at the University of Southern California as a quarterback and runner, and while at the school he had bit parts in some Hollywood films. After clashing with Owen, whom he considered a taskmaster, and inspiring jealousy in some of his teammates who despised his "glamour boy" status, Gifford thrived under Howell. Lombardi switched him from defensive back, where he was already a pro bowl performer, to halfback, and Gifford made seven pro bowls at the position. The Giants went 7–5 in 1954 under Howell. In their thirty-first and final season playing their home games at the Polo Grounds in 1955, they went 5–1–1 over their final seven games to finish 6–5–1. They were led by the rejuvenated Gifford who played the entire season solely on offense for the first time in several years.

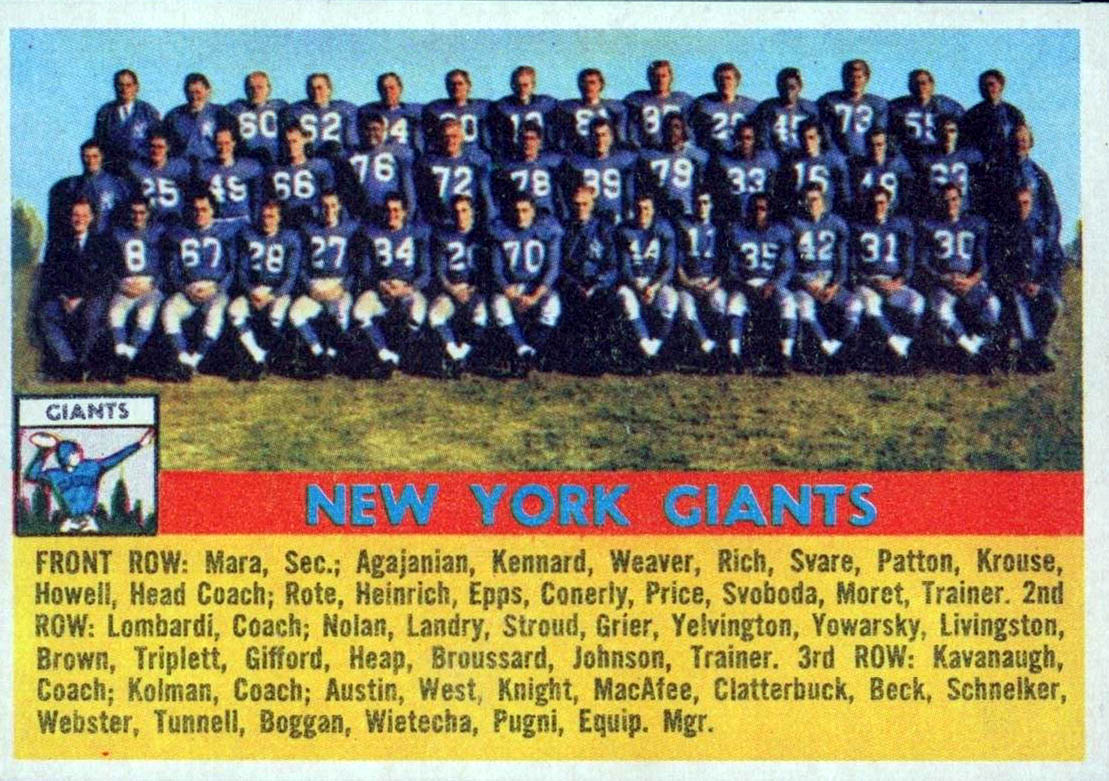
The 1956 NFL champion team

The Giants won their fourth NFL Championship in 1956. Playing their home games at Yankee Stadium for the first time, New York won the Eastern Division with an 8–3–1 record. In the NFL Championship Game on an icy field against the Chicago Bears, the Giants wore sneakers as they had 22 years previous. They dominated the Bears winning the championship by a score of 47–7. The 1956 Giants featured a number of future Hall of Fame players, including 1956 league MVP Gifford, Sam Huff, and Roosevelt Brown. Equally notable, the team featured as its coordinators future Hall of Fame head coaches Tom Landry (defense) and Vince Lombardi (offense). Combined, the pair would later win 7 NFL championships as head coaches. Howell wisely let his assistants do most of the coaching, and acted mostly as an administrator. During his time in New York, Landry (who had been a defensive back for the team) invented the 4-3 defense. This unit, led by middle linebacker Huff and defensive end Andy Robustelli, is credited with "bringing status to the defensive side of the ball", and Giants' fans of this particular team are credited with inventing the "De-fense" chant. Landry used Huff in his middle linebacker position to key in on star Cleveland Browns running back Jim Brown, and this was most effective in a 1958 playoff game where New York held Brown to eight yards in a victory. In addition, those Giants featured Gifford, Kyle Rote, and Pat Summerall, who would go on to highly successful second careers as football announcers. In 1957, the Giants lost their final three games to compile a 7–5 record, finishing second in the NFL's Eastern Division to Cleveland.

=== The Greatest Game Ever Played: 1958 ===
The Giants had another successful year in 1958. They tied for the Eastern Division regular season title with a 9–3 record, and beat the Cleveland Browns 10–0 in a one-game playoff to determine the division winner. In the victory they held Hall of Fame running back Jim Brown to a career low eight yards rushing. They then played in the NFL Championship Game against the Baltimore Colts on December 28, 1958, in front of 64,185 fans at Yankee Stadium. This game, which would become known as "The Greatest Game Ever Played", was a watershed event in the history of the NFL and marked the beginning of the rise of football into the dominant sport in the American market.

The game itself was highly competitive. New York got off to a quick 3–0 lead; however Baltimore scored two touchdowns to take a 14–3 halftime advantage. Late in the third quarter, the Colts appeared ready to put the game out of reach by driving deep into Giants' territory. However, they were stopped and turned the ball over on downs.

This would be a turning point of the game, as the Giants, who had trouble mounting many drives to that point, came back with a 95–yard drive. The key play of the drive was Conerly's pass to Kyle Rote, who after a 62–yard gain, fumbled at the Colts' 25–yard line, where Alex Webster picked up the ball and ran it to the 1–yard line. New York then scored a touchdown, to make the score 14–10. The Giants drove again, with quarterback Charley Conerly throwing a 15–yard touchdown pass to Frank Gifford to take the lead, 17–14.

With just over two minutes left the Giants punted the ball to the Colts, pinning them on their own 14 yard line. The Colts put together one last, desperate drive. The star of this drive was receiver Raymond Berry, who caught three passes for 62 yards, the last one for 22 yards to the Giant 13–yard line. With seven seconds left in regulation, Steve Myhra kicked a 20–yard field goal to tie the score 17–17, sending the game to overtime for the first time in NFL history.

After winning the toss and receiving the ball, the Giants offense stalled and was forced to punt. From their own 20, the Colts drove the ball down the field, with Alan Ameche finally scoring from the 1–yard line to give the championship to the Colts, 23–17.

== More success: 1959–1963 ==
The Giants enjoyed a run of success over the next several years. Led by league MVP quarterback Charlie Conerly, who passed for 1,706 yards, 14 touchdowns, and four interceptions, they finished 9–3 in 1959 and faced the Colts in a championship game rematch. They lost again, this time in a far less dramatic game, 31–16. Conerly struggled with age and injuries in 1960, and was replaced by George Shaw. Gifford was concussed in a vicious hit by Chuck Bednarik during a November game versus the Philadelphia Eagles, and missed the rest of the season, and the following season, as a result. The hit was so devastating, that after being taken to the locker room, Gifford was given his last rites. The team still finished with a winning record at 6–4–2, but were led to acquire former San Francisco 49ers quarterback Y. A. Tittle in the offseason. Led by Tittle and new head coach Allie Sherman, New York won three consecutive Eastern Division titles from 1961 to 1963. In 1961, they were beaten by the Packers, 37–0 in the championship game. In 1962, they went into the championship game with a 12–2 record, and a nine-game winning streak; but lost to the Packers again, 16–7. Nonetheless, the Giants had captivated New York by this time, even though the sold-out game was played in single-digit weather with 35 mph winds, only 299 of the 65,000+ fans who bought tickets stayed home. Before the 1962 season, Gifford came out of his injury-forced retirement, saying he missed the game too much. He changed positions from halfback to flanker. During the season, Tittle and wide receiver Del Shofner set still-standing team records when Tittle threw for seven touchdowns and Shofner amassed 269 receiving yards in the same game on October 28. After the season, the team traded two-time Pro Bowl defensive lineman Roosevelt Grier to the Los Angeles Rams at his request; Grier wanted to move to LA to start his singing career.

Led by league MVP Tittle, who passed for over 3,000 yards and 36 touchdowns, the Giants had an 11–3 record in 1963. They set what remains the NFL's record for most points in a 14-game season by scoring 448. They advanced to face the Chicago Bears in the NFL championship game. On an icy field, New York's defense played well, but Chicago's newly invented zone defense intercepted Tittle five times (including one returned for a score) and injured Tittle in the first half (though he finished the game). Several Giants players including linebacker Huff pleaded with Sherman to replace the hobbled Tittle, who the players felt was pressing and committing too many turnovers, from playing the second half. Sherman however, had little alternative. "The old man kept saying 'I can do it. I feel a little better'" Sherman recalled. "We had a young quarterback (Glynn Griffing), he had gone to get married a couple of weeks earlier but failed to come back in the days he said he would. We couldn't use him." The Giants defense, led by Hall of Famer Huff, held the Bears in check, but they lost 14–10, their third straight NFL Championship Game defeat. New York had a chance to take a 14–0 lead in the first quarter but wide receiver Del Shofner dropped a potential touchdown in the end zone, a drop he said in 2010, that he feels would have won the Giants the game. "I was alone in the end zone—ball right into my hands, nobody around me—and I dropped the ball...as good a defense as we had that year, I don't think the Berar would have ever come back from being down 14–0." On the next play, Tittle threw an interception to Chicago linebacker Larry Morris, which he returned to the New York five-yard line. Two plays later, the Bears tied the game.

New York's run of championship game appearances combined with their large-market location translated into financial success. By the early 1960s, the Giants were receiving $175,000 a game under the NFL's television contract with CBS—four times as much as small-market Green Bay, which was one of the most successful teams of the era. However, in the league's new contract, the Maras convinced the other owners that it would be in the best interest of the NFL to share television revenue equally, a practice which is still current, and is credited with strengthening the league.

== Wilderness years begin: 1964–1972 ==
I think the Jets coming in when they did [1964] contributed to our bad years, because we tried to do everything for the short term rather than the long haul — we'd trade a draft choice for a player, figuring he'd give us one or two good years. We didn't want to accept how the public might react if we had a bad year or two or three.

— Wellington Mara

After the 1963 season, the team fell apart, partly due to trades but also due to poor drafting. Sherman traded away key players on the team's defense — such as Huff and defensive tackle Dick Modzelewski — which was their strongest unit, and Wellington Mara, who came in the 1960s with a reputation as a shrewd judge of talent, exited the decade carrying a sub-par one according to a writer for New York magazine. Modzelewski went on to make the pro bowl in Cleveland in 1964, while Huff did the same in Washington. First round draft choices such as running backs Joe Don Looney, Tucker Frederickson, and Rocky Thompson were disappointments. Frederickson was selected as the first overall draft choice in 1965 (over Hall of Famers Dick Butkus and Gale Sayers), but never rushed for more than 659 yards in a season during his injury-shortened career. This period in team history is often referred to as "the wilderness years".

The Week two game of the 1964 season was played in Pittsburgh. Tittle was brutally tackled by Steelers defensive end John Baker during the second quarter. It was here that Morris Berman, a photographer for the Pittsburgh Gazette, snapped a now famous picture of the injured quarterback kneeling on the ground with blood running down his scalp. Tittle spent that night in a hospital, then returned to play the following week. But it was clear that he was not the same player, and the Giants finished with a disappointing 2-10-2 record. Tittle retired the following summer, and in 1971 was inducted into the Hall of Fame. Following the season Gifford and Alex Webster announced their retirement, and Jack Mara, who had been President of the team for since he was 22, died at the age of 57. The team rebounded with a 7–7 record in 1965, before compiling a league-worst 1–12–1 record in 1966, with their defense setting a new league record by allowing over 500 points. This season also included a 72–41 loss to the rival Redskins at D.C. Stadium in the highest-scoring game in league history. Interest in the team was waning, especially with the rise of the AFL's New York Jets, who featured a wide-open style of play and a charismatic young quarterback in Joe Namath.

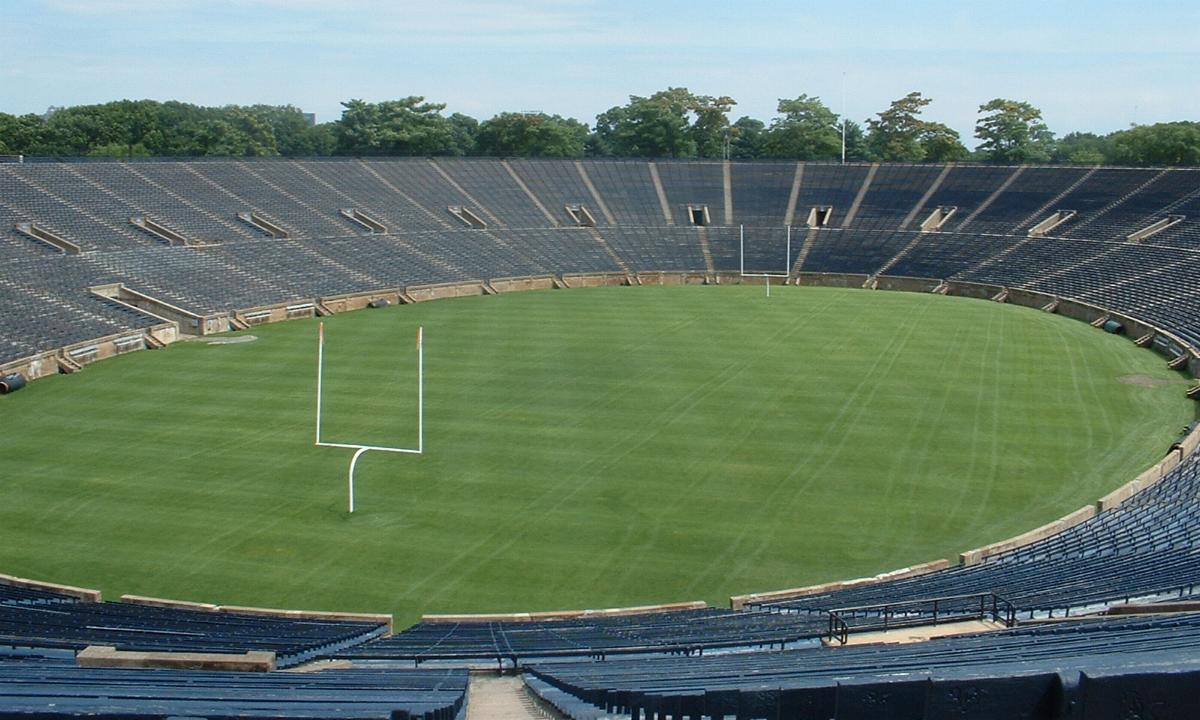
The Yale Bowl was the site of the Giants first meeting with the Jets in 1969, and later served as their home for parts of two seasons.

Looking to improve their on-field product, and also to find a player with talent and star power to better compete with the Jets for New York fans' affections, the Giants acquired quarterback Fran Tarkenton from the Minnesota Vikings before the 1967 season and showed improvement. They finished 7–7 in both the 1967 and 1968 seasons. In those seasons, one of Tarkenton's favorite targets, wide receiver Homer Jones made the Pro Bowl by amassing over 2,200 yards and 21 touchdowns. The team also upset the division champion Dallas Cowboys 27–21 in one of their biggest wins in years, and the Giants' jubilant players carried Sherman off the field on their shoulders. After the game, Wellington Mara said he expected Sherman to remain the team's coach for several more seasons, however, after starting 7–3 they lost their final four games.

During the 1969 preseason, the Giants lost their first meeting with the Jets, 37–14, in front of 70,874 fans at the Yale Bowl in New Haven, Connecticut. Three weeks later, Wellington Mara fired Sherman, and replaced him with former Giants fullback Alex Webster. Sherman was a lax disciplinarian, who Gifford later said "wanted to be loved and that's deadly for a coach." The firing was welcomed by fans: a writer from The New York Times commented, "[t]he Giants last winning season was 1963 and since then the fans's sing-song chant "Good-by Allie!" has mounted to a crescendo." On opening day of the 1969 regular season, Tarkenton led the Giants to a 24–23 victory over his former team, the Vikings, by throwing two touchdown passes in the fourth quarter. New York finished 6–8 in the 1969 season under Webster.

In 1970, Tarkenton's fourth with the Giants, New York showed marked improvement, fielding their most competitive team since 1963. After an 0–3 start the Giants won 9 out of their next 10, and went into their season finale against the Los Angeles Rams with a chance to win the NFC East Division. Though New York took an early 3–0 lead, the Rams scored the next 31 points, dashing the Giants hopes and leaving them out of the playoffs. Tarkenton had his best season as a Giant in 1970 and made the Pro Bowl. Much of the team's success was credited to him. Teammate Fred Dryer later commented, "[w]ithout Tarkenton, I don't think we would have won any games." Running back Ron Johnson also made the Pro Bowl and ran for 1,027 yards, becoming the first Giant ever to gain 1,000 yards rushing in a season, and Webster was named NFL Coach of the Year. Meanwhile, the Jets, much as the Giants had in 1964, fell apart, dropping to a 4–10 record after several consecutive seasons of success, with Namath breaking his wrist in a Super Bowl III rematch with the Baltimore Colts and missing the final eight games.

New York was unable to build on their 1970 success. Tarkenton left the team's 1971 training camp in a salary dispute, before coming back a few days later after signing a one-year contract. In place of a salary increase, Tarkenton had asked for a large loan to get a tax break, but the Maras turned it down, and made sure the press knew the raise and loan were denied. Johnson missed most of the season with a knee injury, and the Giants dropped to 4–10. Before the 1972 season they traded Tarkenton, who frequently feuded with Webster, back to the Vikings. Initially the trade produced positive results, as New York rallied to finish 8–6 in 1972. The 1972 team was led by veteran journeyman quarterback Norm Snead (acquired in the trade for Tarkenton), who led the league in passing and had the best season of his career. They set a still-standing team record on November 26 when they scored 62 points via eight touchdowns and two field goals. After the 1972 season however, the Giants suffered one of the worst prolonged stretches in their history. Meanwhile, Tarkenton would lead the Vikings to three Super Bowls and establish a Hall of Fame resume.

== Leaving New York: 1973–1978 ==
Desiring their own home stadium, in the early 1970s the Giants reached an agreement with the New Jersey Sports and Exposition Authority to play their home games at a brand-new, state-of-the-art, dedicated football stadium. The stadium, which would be known as Giants Stadium, was to be built at a brand new sports complex in East Rutherford, New Jersey.

As the complex was being built, and their current home at Yankee Stadium was being renovated, they would be without a home for three years. Their final full season at Yankee Stadium was 1972. After playing their first two games there in 1973, the Giants played the rest of their home games in 1973, as well as all of their home games in 1974, at the Yale Bowl in New Haven, Connecticut. This was done out of a desire to have their own home field, as opposed to having to share Shea Stadium with the Jets. However, between access problems, neighborhood issues, the age of the stadium (it was built in 1914), and the lack of modern amenities (it did not and still does not have lights or on-site locker rooms), the Giants reconsidered their decision and ultimately agreed to share Shea Stadium with the Jets for the 1975 season. The Giants left Yale Bowl after losing all seven home games played at Yale in the 1974 season and compiling a home record of 1–11 over that two-year stretch.

After the 1973 season the team fired Webster, who later admitted his heart was never in head coaching, and said he more enjoyed life as an assistant. They hired retired star defensive end Andy Robustelli to run their football operations, and he picked Miami Dolphins defensive coordinator Bill Arnsparger as the team's head coach. Arnsparger had built an enviable reputation as the architect of the Dolphins defense which helped the team to two Super Bowl championships. Robustelli traded their 1975 first round draft choice to the Cowboys (who used it to select Hall of Fame defensive lineman Randy White) for quarterback Craig Morton in the middle of the 1974 season.

One of the bright spots in this era was the play of tight end Bob Tucker who, from 1970 through part of the 1977 season was one of the top tight ends in the NFL. He led the league with 59 receptions in 1971, becoming the first Giant ever to do so. Tucker amassed 327 receptions, 4,322 yards and 22 touchdowns during his years as a Giant.

Despite their new home and heightened fan interest, New York suffered posted a 3–11 season in 1976. After compiling a 7–28 record Arsnparger was fired during the middle of that year. They traded the struggling Morton to the Denver Broncos following the season for quarterback Steve Ramsey. Morton led the Broncos to Super Bowl XII in his first season there, while Ramsey never started for the Giants, or any NFL team, after the trade. They went 5–9 in 1977, featuring the unusual choice of three rookie quarterbacks on the roster. In 1978, New York started the year 5–6 and played the Eagles at home with a chance to solidify their playoff prospects. However, the season imploded on November 19, 1978, in one of the most improbable finishes in NFL history. Playing their archrival the Philadelphia Eagles the Giants were leading 17–12 and had possession of the ball with only 30 seconds left. They had only to kneel the ball to end the game, as the Eagles had no time outs.

However, instead of kneeling the ball, offensive coordinator Bob Gibson ordered Giants quarterback Joe Pisarcik to run play "pro 65 up", which was designed to hand the ball off to fullback Larry Csonka. Pisarcik never gained control of the ball after the snap however, and gave a wobbly handoff to Csonka. "I never had control of the ball" Pisarcik later recalled. It rolled off Csonka's hip and bounced free. Eagles safety Herman Edwards picked up the loose ball and ran, untouched, for a score, giving the Eagles an improbable 19–17 victory. After the game Giants coach John McVay stated "[t]hat's the most horrifying ending to a ball game I've ever seen." This play is referred to as "The Miracle at the Meadowlands" among Eagles fans, and "The Fumble" among Giants fans.

In the aftermath of the defeat, Gibson was fired (the next morning). New York lost three out of their last four games to finish 6-10 and out the playoffs for the 15th consecutive season, leading them to let McVay go as well. Two games after "The Fumble", angry Giants fans burned tickets in the parking lot. Protests continued throughout the remainder of the season, reaching a crescendo in the final home game. A group of fans hired a small plane to fly over the stadium on game day carrying a banner that read: "15 years of Lousy Football — We've Had Enough." Fans in the stadium responded, chanting "We've had enough...We've had enough" after the plane flew overhead. The game had 24,374 no-shows, and fans hanged an effigy of Wellington Mara in the Stadium parking lot. However, following the 1978 season came the steps that would, in time, lead the Giants back to the pinnacle of the NFL.

== See also ==
- List of New York Giants seasons
- Logos and uniforms of the New York Giants
- List of New York Giants players

== Sources ==
- Axthelm, Pete. "The Giants go to Jersey, or, Father Mara knows best." New York, New York Media, LLC Vol. 4, No. 44 November 1, 1971 issue, ISSN 0028-7369 (available online)
- Baker, Jim and Corbett, Bernard M. The Most Memorable Games in Giants History: The Oral History of a Legendary Team. Bloomsbury USA 2010 ISBN 1-60819-068-4
- Buckley, James Jr. Great Moments in Football. Milwaukee: Gareth Stevens 2002 ISBN 0-8368-5360-1
- Carroll, John Martin. Grange and the Rise of Modern Football. Urbana: University of Illinois Press 1999 ISBN 0-252-07166-2
- Eskenazi, Gerald. There Were Giants in Those Days. New York: Grosset & Dunlap 1976 ISBN 0-448-12451-3
- Gottehrer, Barry. The Giants of New York, the history of professional football's most fabulous dynasty. New York, G. P. Putnam's Sons 1963 OCLC 1356301
- Lichtenstein, Michael. The New York Giants Trivia Book. New York: St. Martin's Press 2001 ISBN 0-312-28664-3
- Flores, Tom. Coaching Football, New York: McGraw Hill 2006 ISBN 0-07-143914-5
- Frostino, Nino. Right on the Numbers, British Columbia: Trafford Publishing 2004 ISBN 1-4120-3305-5
- Gottehrer, Barry. The Giants of New York, the history of professional football's most fabulous dynasty. New York G. P. Putnam's Sons 1963 OCLC 1356301
- Fullerton, John. Screen Culture: History and Textuality. London: Indiana University Press 2004 ISBN 0-86196-645-7
- Neft, David S., Cohen, Richard M., and Korch, Rick. The Complete History of Professional Football from 1892 to the Present. New York: St. Martin's Press 1994 ISBN 0-312-11435-4
- Pellowski, Steve. The Little Giant Book of Football Facts, New York: Sterling Publishing 2005 ISBN 1-4027-2390-3
- Pervin, Lawrence A. Football's New York Giants: A History. McFarland 2009 ISBN 0-7864-4268-9
- Schwartz, John. Tales from the New York Giants Sideline. Champaign: Sports Publishing LLC 2004 ISBN 1-58261-758-9
- Sprechman, Jordan and Shannon, Bill. This Day in New York Sports. Illinois: Sports Publishing LLC 1998 ISBN 1-57167-254-0
- Walsh, Chris. New York Giants Football: Guide and Record Book. Illinois: Triumph Books 2009 ISBN 1-60078-189-6
- Watterson, John Sayle. College Football: history, spectacle, controversy. Baltimore: Johns Hopkins University Press 2000 ISBN 0-8018-7114-X
- Whittingham, Richard. What Giants They Were. Chicago: Triumph Books 2000 ISBN 1-57243-368-X
