= List of Austin Peay Governors in the NFL draft =

This is a list of Austin Peay Governors football players in the NFL draft.

== Key ==
B	Back	K	Kicker	NT	Nose tackle
C	Center	LB	Linebacker	FB	Fullback
DB	Defensive back	P	Punter	HB	Halfback
DE	Defensive end	QB	Quarterback	WR	Wide receiver
DT	Defensive tackle	RB	Running back	G	Guard
E	End	T	Offensive tackle	TE	Tight end

= Pro Bowler
= Hall of Famer

== Selections ==
Year	Round	Pick	Player	Team	Position
1951	22	266	Waldo Binkley	New York Giants	T
1957	10	115	Joe Grisham	Baltimore Colts	E
1966	18	269	Ron Parson	San Francisco 49ers	WR
1973	10	242	Bonnie Sloan	St. Louis Cardinals	T
1996	4	113	Kirk Pointer	Miami Dolphins	DB

== Notable undrafted players ==
Note: No drafts held before 1920

Debut year	Player name	Position	Debut NFL/AFL team	Notes
1987	Boris Byrd	DB	New York Giants	
1996	Jeff Gooch	LB	Tampa Bay Buccaneers	
2019	D. J. Montgomery	WR	Cleveland Browns	
