= 1939 NFL All-Star Game =

National Football League all-star game

1939 NFL All-star Game
New York Giants	All-America All-Stars
13	10
Head coach: Steve Owen (New York Giants)	Head coach: Gus Henderson (Detroit Lions)
	1	2	3	4	Total
New York Giants	0	3	0	10	13
All-America All-Stars	0	3	0	7	10
- Date: January 15, 1939
- Stadium: Wrigley Field; Los Angeles, California
- MVP: none selected
- Attendance: 15,000

TV in the United States
- Network: not televised

The 1939 National Football League All-star Game was the professional football league's first-ever all-star game, sponsored by the Los Angeles Times as a charity game to benefit the Salvation Army. It pitted the New York Giants, the league's champion for the 1938 season, against a team of all-stars. The game was played on Sunday, January 15, 1939, at Wrigley Field in Los Angeles, California in front of 15,000 fans; although 30,000 spectators were expected, bad weather led to the poor attendance. The Giants defeated the all-stars by a score of 13–10.

The players on the all-star squad were selected by fan balloting. For the only time in the game's history, players from teams outside the NFL were invited; five players from the Los Angeles Bulldogs and Hollywood Stars, two local teams in what would eventually become the Pacific Coast Professional Football League, were among the members of the All-Star team.

== Rosters ==
The players involved in this game were:

=== All-American All-Stars roster ===
Position:	Starters:	Reserves:
Quarterback	Erny Pinckert, Washington Redskins	Stu Smith, Pittsburgh Pirates; Ed Goddard, Cleveland Rams; Gordon Gore, Los Angeles Bulldogs; Johnny Drake, Cleveland Rams; Cecil Isbell, Green Bay Packers
Left Halfback	Sammy Baugh, Washington Redskins	Stu Smith, Pittsburgh Pirates; Ed Goddard, Cleveland Rams; Gordon Gore, Los Angeles Bulldogs; Johnny Drake, Cleveland Rams; Cecil Isbell, Green Bay Packers
Right Halfback	Lloyd Cardwell, Detroit Lions	Stu Smith, Pittsburgh Pirates; Ed Goddard, Cleveland Rams; Gordon Gore, Los Angeles Bulldogs; Johnny Drake, Cleveland Rams; Cecil Isbell, Green Bay Packers
Fullback	Clarke Hinkle, Green Bay Packers	Stu Smith, Pittsburgh Pirates; Ed Goddard, Cleveland Rams; Gordon Gore, Los Angeles Bulldogs; Johnny Drake, Cleveland Rams; Cecil Isbell, Green Bay Packers
Left End	Gaynell Tinsley, Chicago Cardinals	Bob McChesney, Washington Redskins; Joe Carter, Philadelphia Eagles; Bill Moore, Los Angeles Bulldogs
Right End	Perry Schwartz, Brooklyn Dodgers	Bob McChesney, Washington Redskins; Joe Carter, Philadelphia Eagles; Bill Moore, Los Angeles Bulldogs
Left Tackle	Joe Stydahar, Chicago Bears	Ernie Smith, Hollywood Stars
Right Tackle	Frank Kinard, Brooklyn Dodgers	Ernie Smith, Hollywood Stars
Left Guard	Byron Gentry, Pittsburgh Pirates	Owen Hansen, Hollywood Stars; Bill Radovich, Detroit Lions; Russ Letlow, Green Bay Packers
Right Guard	Pete Mehringer, Los Angeles Bulldogs	Owen Hansen, Hollywood Stars; Bill Radovich, Detroit Lions; Russ Letlow, Green Bay Packers
Center	John Wiatrak, Cleveland Rams	Phil Dougherty, Chicago Cardinals

=== New York Giants roster ===
Position:	Starters:	Reserves:
Quarterback	Nello Falaschi	Tuffy Leemans; Len Barnum; John Karcis; Kink Richards; Johnny Gildea; Dale Burnett; Leland Shaffer
Left Halfback	Hank Soar	Tuffy Leemans; Len Barnum; John Karcis; Kink Richards; Johnny Gildea; Dale Burnett; Leland Shaffer
Right Halfback	Ward Cuff	Tuffy Leemans; Len Barnum; John Karcis; Kink Richards; Johnny Gildea; Dale Burnett; Leland Shaffer
Fullback	Ed Danowski	Tuffy Leemans; Len Barnum; John Karcis; Kink Richards; Johnny Gildea; Dale Burnett; Leland Shaffer
Left End	Jim Lee Howell	Hap Barnard; Chuck Gelatka; Jack Haden
Right End	Jim Poole	Hap Barnard; Chuck Gelatka; Jack Haden
Left Tackle	Ed Widseth	Frank Cope; John Mellus
Right Tackle	Ox Parry	Frank Cope; John Mellus
Left Guard	Orville Tuttle	Pete Cole
Right Guard	Kayo Lunday	Pete Cole
Center	Mel Hein	Stan Galazin
