= Ken Lunday =

American football player (1912–2005)

No. 5
- Position: Guard / Linebacker / Center

Personal information
- Born: August 13, 1912; Cleora, Oklahoma, U.S.
- Died: July 13, 2005 (aged 92); Durant, Oklahoma, U.S.
- Listed height: 6 ft 3 in (1.91 m)
- Listed weight: 217 lb (98 kg)

Career information
- High school: Cleora (OK)
- College: Arkansas
- NFL draft: 1937: undrafted

Career history
- New York Giants (1937–1941, 1946–1947)

Awards and highlights
- NFL champion (1938); NFL All-Star Game (1938)
- Stats at Pro Football Reference

Lewis Kenneth "Kayo" Lunday (August 13, 1912 – July 13, 2005) was an American football offensive lineman for the New York Giants of the National Football League (NFL).
