= Nello Falaschi =

American football player (1913–1986)

No. 28
- Positions: Fullback, Center

Personal information
- Born: March 19, 1913; Dos Palos, California, U.S.
- Died: July 29, 1986 (aged 73); Oakland, California, U.S.
- Listed height: 6 ft 0 in (1.83 m)
- Listed weight: 195 lb (88 kg)

Career information
- High school: San Jose (CA) Bellarmine
- College: Santa Clara (1933-1936)
- NFL draft: 1937: 2nd round, 16th overall pick

Career history
- New York Giants (1938–1941)

Awards and highlights
- NFL champion (1938); 2× NFL All-Star Game (1938, 1941); First-team All-American (1936); First-team All-PCC (1936)

Career NFL statistics
- Rushing yards: 10
- Rushing average: 5
- Receptions: 7
- Receiving yards: 39
- Interceptions: 2
- Stats at Pro Football Reference
- College Football Hall of Fame

Nello Donald Falaschi (March 19, 1913 – July 29, 1986), sometimes listed as Nello Frederick Falaschi, also known by the nicknames "Flash" Falaschi and "Gunner" Falaschi, was an American professional football player. He played college football for the Santa Clara University Broncos from 1933 to 1936. He also played professional football for the National Football League (NFL) for the New York Giants from 1938 to 1941. He was inducted into the College Football Hall of Fame in 1971 and the California High School Football Hall of fame in 2023.

== Early life ==
Falaschi was born in 1913 at Dos Palos, California. He played high school football at Bellarmine College Preparatory in San Jose, California.

== College career ==
Falaschi enrolled at Santa Clara University, where he played college football as quarterback for the Santa Clara Broncos football team. Known primarily as a ball carrier and blocker, he led the 1936 Santa Clara Broncos football team to an 8–1 and a victory in victory over LSU in the 1937 Sugar Bowl. At the end of the 1936 season, Fallaschi was selected as the first-team All-America quarterback by the International News Service and the All-America Board of Football.

== Professional career ==
Falaschi was selected by the Washington Redskins in the second round (16th overall pick) of the 1937 NFL draft. Instead, he served as an assistant coach at Santa Clara and after the college football season ended, as a quarterback and fullback for the Salinas Ice Packers during the 1937 football season. The 1937 Salinas team included other star players including Larry Lutz, Larry Siemering, and Dick Bassi.

In January 1938, Falaschi signed a contract to play for the New York Giants. He played for the Giants from 1938 to 1941. He appeared in 42 games for the Giants, 33 as a starter, and helped lead the 1938 Giants to the NFL championship and the 1939 and 1941 teams to Eastern Division crowns. He was named to Pro Bowl team in 1938, 1939, and 1941. He was a 60-minute player who played at the back position on both offense and defense for the Giants and was known for his quarterback sacks.

Falaschi entered the U.S. Navy in 1942 and played for the St. Mary's Pre-Flight football team before deploying overseas.

== After football ==
After his football career ended, Falaschi became a general contractor in Oakland, California. He was inducted into the College Football Hall of Fame in 1971. He was the first player inducted from a Catholic university west of Notre Dame.

Falaschi died in 1986 at age 71 in Oakland.
