= Ox Parry =

American football player (1914–1976)

Profile
- Position: Tackle

Personal information
- Born: November 14, 1914; San Antonio, Texas, U.S.
- Died: March 2, 1976 (aged 61); Henrietta, Texas, U.S.
- Listed height: 6 ft 4 in (1.93 m)
- Listed weight: 230 lb (104 kg)

Career information
- High school: Dallas (TX) Woodrow Wilson
- College: Baylor

Career history
- New York Giants (1937–1939)

Awards and highlights
- NFL champion (1938); NFL All-Star Game (1938); First-team All-SWC (1936)
- Stats at Pro Football Reference

Owen Lloyd "Ox" Parry (November 17, 1914 – March 2, 1976) was a professional American football tackle who played three seasons for the New York Giants.
