= Ray Hanken =

American football player (1911–1980)

No. 18, 37
- Position: End

Personal information
- Born: December 3, 1911; Oelwein, Iowa, U.S.
- Died: November 29, 1980 (aged 68); Vienna, Virginia, U.S.
- Listed height: 5 ft 11 in (1.80 m)
- Listed weight: 190 lb (86 kg)

Career information
- High school: Sacred Heart (Oelwein)
- College: George Washington (1933–1936)
- NFL draft: 1937: undrafted

Career history
- Baltimore Orioles (1936); New York Giants (1937–1938); Jersey City Giants (1939); New York Giants (1940)*; Norfolk Shamrocks (1940)
- * Offseason or practice squad member only

Awards and highlights
- NFL champion (1938); NFL All-Star Game (1938)
- Stats at Pro Football Reference

Raymond George Hanken (December 3, 1911 – November 29, 1980) was an American professional football end who played two seasons with the New York Giants of the National Football League (NFL). He played college football at George Washington University.

== Early life and college ==
Raymond George Hanken was born on December 3, 1911, in Oelwein, Iowa. He attended Sacred Heart High School in Oelwein.

Hanken was a member of the George Washington Colonials of George Washington University from 1933 to 1936 and a two-year letterman from 1935 to 1936. He was a blocking back for two seasons before switching to end as a senior.

== Professional career ==
On November 29, 1936, Hanken made his pro debut in a start for the Baltimore Orioles of the Dixie League against the Washington Pros. The Orioles won 13–7. He wore number 18 with the Orioles.

Hanken signed with the New York Giants in 1937. He played in 11 games, starting two, for the Giants during the 1937 season, catching four passes for 51 yards. He appeared in ten games, starting one, in 1938, recording five receptions for 73 yards and two touchdowns. The Giants beat the Green Bay Packers by a score of 23–17 in the 1938 NFL Championship Game. On January 15, 1939, the Giants played a team of football All-Stars in the NFL's first-ever All-Star game. Hanken was released in 1939.

Hanken played in one game, a start, for the Jersey City Giants of the American Association in 1939.

He signed with the New York Giants again in 1940 but was later released.

Hanken appeared in one game for the Norfolk Shamrocks of the Dixie League in 1940.

== Personal life ==
Hanken served in the United States Navy. He died on November 29, 1980, in Vienna, Virginia.
