= Ed Danowski =

American football player and coach (1911–1997)

- Danowski in 1935

No. 22
- Position: Halfback

Personal information
- Born: September 30, 1911; Jamesport, New York, U.S.
- Died: February 1, 1997 (aged 85); New York, New York, U.S.
- Listed height: 6 ft 1 in (1.85 m)
- Listed weight: 198 lb (90 kg)

Career information
- High school: Riverhead (Riverhead, New York)
- College: Fordham

Career history

Playing
- New York Giants (1934–1941)

Coaching
- Fordham (1946–1954) Head coach

Awards and highlights
- 2× NFL champion (1934, 1938); 2× First-team All-Pro (1935, 1938); Second-team All-Pro (1937); NFL All-Star Game (1938); 2× NFL passer rating leader (1937, 1938); 2× NFL completion percentage leader (1937, 1938); NFL passing yards leader (1935); NFL passing touchdowns leader (1935); Second-team All-American (1933)

Career statistics
- Passing attempts: 637
- Passing completions: 309
- Completion percentage: 48.5%
- TD–INT: 37–44
- Passing yards: 3,817
- Passer rating: 58.1
- Stats at Pro Football Reference

Edward Frank Danowski (September 30, 1911 – February 1, 1997) was an American football player and coach. He played quarterback and halfback in the National Football League (NFL) with the New York Giants from 1934 to 1941. Danowski served as the head football coach at Fordham University from 1946 to 1954.

== Early life ==
Danowski grew up in Aquebogue, New York. His father, Anton, was a Polish immigrant.

== Playing career ==
A graduate of Fordham University, Danowski played for the New York Giants for seven seasons (1934–1939, 1941). Although statistics are not kept for his record of wins and losses during his career, Danowski proved a worthy quarterback presence for seven seasons, with the Giants having just one losing season during his time with the team, as he served as the primary starter from 1935 to 1939, leading the Giants to four NFL Championship games (1934, 1935, 1938, 1939). Danowski's best season as a pro was in 1935, as he threw for 794 yards and 10 touchdowns on a combined 57-of-113 (all of which were league highs) with nine interceptions, and became the first quarterback in league history to throw for more touchdowns than interceptions in a season. He also ran for 335 yards on 130 carries for two touchdowns as he was named First-team All-Pro. Danowski also led the league in passer rating in 1937 and 1938 (with rates of 72.8 and 66.9, respectively). Since records of the passer rating were tabulated for the 1936 season, Danowski was the first quarterback to lead the league in passer rating in consecutive years, which would not occur again until Tommy Thompson did so in 1948–49.

In the 1934 NFL Championship Game, the team faced the 13–0 and heavily favored Chicago Bears. He went 6-of-11 for 83 yards with a touchdown and two interceptions while running for 59 yards on 20 carries and a touchdown as the Giants rallied from being down 13–3 in the final quarter to score four touchdowns (two from Ken Strong and the others being by Danowski) to win 30–13 in a game commonly referred to as the "Sneakers Game", as the Giants switched to the shoe in the third quarter to play better on the frozen Polo Grounds surface. The following year, he led the Giants back to the title game. Facing the Detroit Lions, he went 4-of-7 for 88 yards with a touchdown and an interception while running for 14 yards on seven carries and returning kicks for 51 combined yards. However, in a game of rushing, the Lions outpaced them (running for 246 yards on 65 carries while passing just five times while New York ran for 106 yards on 44 carries) in a 26–7 rout.

In 1938, the Giants returned to the title game. Facing the Green Bay Packers at home, he threw 7-of-11 for 74 yards for two touchdowns. His touchdown pass to Hank Soar from 23 yards in the third quarter proved the winning score as New York overcame being outrun and outpassed with turnover luck (3 to 1) as Danowski became the first quarterback to win and lose two NFL Championship games. The two teams met again the following year for the title, with Green Bay not to be denied this time at home. Danowski threw 4-of-12 for 47 yards with three interceptions while the Packers routed them 27–0. Pulling Danowski from the game did not help matters much, as Eddie Miller, Tuffy Leemans, and Len Barnum went a combined 5-of-14 for three interceptions.

By 1939, the Giants would start other players in the position that ranged from Miller to Leemans (who generally served as a fullback), and a permanent quarterback for the team would not occur until Charlie Conerly was drafted in 1948. After having left the game in 1939, he returned for one more season in 1941, making appearances in six games. He threw a combined 12-of-24 for 179 yards and two touchdowns to three interceptions as Tuffy Leemans helped lead the Giants to an NFL Championship game appearance and Danowski left the game for good after the season ended.

== Coaching career ==
Danowski returned to Fordham as the head football coach from 1946 to 1954, amassing a record of 29–44–3 (.401). His 1949 squad reached No. 20 in the AP poll.

== Family and honors ==
Danowski's son, John Danowski, is the head lacrosse coach at Duke University. His grandson, Matt Danowski, is a former professional lacrosse player.

Danowski was inducted into the Suffolk Sports Hall of Fame in 1991.

== Head coaching record ==
Year	Team	Overall	Conference	Standing	Bowl/playoffs
Fordham Rams (Independent) (1946–1954)
1946	Fordham	0–7			
1947	Fordham	1–6–1			
1948	Fordham	3–6			
1949	Fordham	5–3			
1950	Fordham	8–1			
1951	Fordham	5–4			
1952	Fordham	2–5–1			
1953	Fordham	4–5			
1954	Fordham	1–7–1			
Fordham:		29–44–3			
Total:		29–44–3			

== See also ==
- History of the New York Giants (1925–1978)
