= John Mellus =

American football player (1917–2005)

No. 33, 45, 48
- Position: Offensive tackle

Personal information
- Born: June 16, 1917; Plymouth, Pennsylvania, U.S.
- Died: November 28, 2005 (aged 88); Dallas, Pennsylvania, U.S.
- Listed height: 6 ft 0 in (1.83 m)
- Listed weight: 214 lb (97 kg)

Career information
- High school: Hanover Twp., Luzerne Co., (PA)
- College: Villanova (1934-1937)
- NFL draft: 1938: 9th round, 78th overall pick

Career history
- New York Giants (1938–1941); San Francisco 49ers (1946); Baltimore Colts (1947-1949)

Awards and highlights
- NFL champion (1938); First-team All-Pro (1941); 2× NFL All-Star Game (1938, 1941); Second-team All-American (1937); Second-team All-Eastern (1937)

Career NFL/AAFC statistics
- Games played: 95
- Games started: 47
- Stats at Pro Football Reference

John George Mellus (June 16, 1917 – November 28, 2005) was an American professional football player who played professional football as an tackle for eight seasons in the National Football League (NFL) and the All-America Football Conference (AAFC).

== Career ==
Mellus was born in 1917, at Plymouth, Pennsylvania, the grandson of Lithuanian immigrants, and graduated in 1934 from Hanover High School at Hanover Township, Luzerne County, Pennsylvania.

Mellus attended Villanova University from 1934 to 1937, where he played football. In 1937 he was named to the New York Sun's collegiate All-America team (first-team) and to the Associated Press's 13th annual collegiate All-America team (second-team).

Mellus was drafted in the ninth round of the 1938 NFL Draft. In 1938, Mellus played for the New York Giants on their championship team, and on their teams of 1939 to 1941. In December 1941, he was named to the first-team of the Associated Press's NFL All-Star team. After being drafted into military service in February 1942, Mellus played for the Eastern Army All-Star Team. In December 1943, he was named to the Associated Press's military service All American team.

Following his discharge from the military, Mellus played in 1946 for the San Francisco 49ers and from 1947 to 1949 for the Baltimore Colts. He was inducted into the Luzerne County Sports Hall of Fame in 1988, and into the Villanova University "Wall of Fame" in 2002.

Mellus died at Dallas, Pennsylvania in 2005.
