= New York Giants all-time roster =

The New York Giants all-time roster is split by name into the following two lists:

- New York Giants all-time roster (A–Kim)
- New York Giants all-time roster (Kin–Z)
