= Larry Johnson (linebacker) =

American football player (1909–1972)

No. 31
- Position: Linebacker / Center / End

Personal information
- Born: March 28, 1909; Odanah, Wisconsin, U.S.
- Died: September 3, 1972 (aged 63); Reno, Nevada, U.S.
- Listed height: 6 ft 3 in (1.91 m)
- Listed weight: 223 lb (101 kg)

Career information
- College: Haskell

Career history
- Boston Redskins (1933–1935); New York Giants (1936–1939); Washington Redskins (1944)

Awards and highlights
- NFL champion (1938); NFL All-Star Game (1938)
- Stats at Pro Football Reference

Lawrence Waukechon Johnson (March 28, 1909 – September 3, 1972) was an American football player. He played professionally in the National Football League (NFL) for the Boston/Washington Redskins and the New York Giants. Johnson played college football at the Haskell Institute—now known as Haskell Indian Nations University.
