= Jack Haden =

American football player (1914–1996)

No. 9
- Position: Tackle

Personal information
- Born: October 2, 1914; Fort Worth, Texas, U.S.
- Died: January 25, 1996 (aged 81); Odessa, Texas, U.S.
- Listed height: 6 ft 4 in (1.93 m)
- Listed weight: 233 lb (106 kg)

Career information
- High school: Central (Fort Worth)
- College: Arkansas (1932–1935)
- NFL draft: 1936: undrafted

Career history
- New York Giants (1936–1938); Cleveland Rams (1939)*
- * Offseason or practice squad member only

Awards and highlights
- NFL champion (1938); NFL All-Star Game (1938)
- Stats at Pro Football Reference

Jack Craydon Haden (October 2, 1914 – January 25, 1996) was an American professional football tackle who played three seasons with the New York Giants of the National Football League (NFL). He played college football at the University of Arkansas.

== Early life and college ==
Jack Craydon Haden was born on October 2, 1914, in Fort Worth, Texas. He attended Central High School in Fort Worth.

Haden was a member of the Arkansas Razorbacks of the University of Arkansas from 1932 to 1935 and a three-year letterman from 1933 to 1935.

== Professional career ==
Haden went undrafted in the 1936 NFL draft and later signed with the New York Giants on June 18, 1936. He played in nine games, starting one, for the team during the 1936 season. He appeared in ten games, starting two, in 1937. Haden became a free agent after the season and signed with the Giants again on August 3, 1938. He played in all 11 games, starting four, during the 1938 season as the Giants finished with an 8–2–1 record and beat the Green Bay Packers in the 1938 NFL Championship Game. On January 15, 1939, the Giants played a team of football All-Stars in the NFL's first-ever All-Star game.

In February 1939, Haden was traded to the Cleveland Rams for Carl Littlefield.

== Personal life ==
Haden died on January 25, 1996, in Odessa, Texas.
