= Chuck Gelatka =

American football player (1914–2001)

- Gelatka with the New York Giants in 1938

No. 29
- Position: End

Personal information
- Born: January 28, 1914; Chicago, Illinois, U.S.
- Died: May 23, 2001 (aged 87); Red Bank, New Jersey, U.S.
- Listed height: 6 ft 1 in (1.85 m)
- Listed weight: 185 lb (84 kg)

Career information
- High school: Francis W. Parker (Chicago)
- College: Mississippi State (1933–1936)
- NFL draft: 1937: 10th round, 94th overall pick

Career history
- New York Giants (1937–1940)

Awards and highlights
- NFL champion (1938); NFL All-Star Game (1938); Second-team All-SEC (1935)

Career NFL statistics
- Receptions: 20
- Receiving yards: 250
- Receiving touchdowns: 1
- Stats at Pro Football Reference

Charles T. Gelatka (January 28, 1914 – May 23, 2001) was an American professional football end who played four seasons with the New York Giants of the National Football League (NFL). He was selected by the Giants in the tenth round of the 1937 NFL draft after playing college football at Mississippi State University. He was a member of the Giants team that won the 1938 NFL Championship.

== Early life ==
Charles T. Gelatka was born on January 28, 1914, in Chicago, Illinois. He attended Francis W. Parker School in Chicago, Illinois.

== College career ==
Gelatka was a member of the Mississippi State Bulldogs from 1933 to 1936 and a three-year letterman from 1934 to 1936. In 1935, he was named second-team All-SEC by the Associated Press and first-team All-SEC by The Plainsman, Auburn University's student newspaper. He later played in the 1937 Orange Bowl. He also played in the 1937 Chicago Charities College All-Star Game, a 6–0 victory over the defending NFL champion Green Bay Packers.

== Professional career ==
Gelatka was selected by the New York Giants in the 10th round, with the 94th overall pick, of the 1937 NFL draft. He officially signed with the team on August 10, 1937. He played in four games during the 1937 season and caught one pass for 17 yards. He appeared in ten games, starting three, in 1938, recording seven receptions for 106 yards and one touchdown. Gelatka also played in the 1938 NFL Championship Game, a 23–17 victory over the Green Bay Packers. On January 15, 1939, the Giants played a team of football All-Stars in the NFL's first-ever All-Star game, where Gelatka had a 22-yard reception in the 13–10 victory. Gelatka played in ten games in 1939, catching six passes for 71 yards. He appeared in ten games for the third straight season in 1940 and made six receptions for 56 yards. He became a free agent after the season.

== Personal life ==
During the NFL offseasons, Gelatka worked as a lifeguard in Chicago and at an R.R. Donnelley printing factory. After the 1940 NFL season, Gelatka joined the United States Army Air Forces. He spent time as a fighter pilot in Australia during World War II. He died on May 23, 2001, in Red Bank, New Jersey.
