= Charles Barnard (American football) =

American football player (1915–2008)

Profile
- Position: Wide receiver

Personal information
- Born: March 3, 1915; Ovalo, Texas, U.S.
- Died: June 29, 2008 (aged 93); Garland, Texas, U.S.
- Listed height: 6 ft 2 in (1.88 m)
- Listed weight: 190 lb (86 kg)

Career information
- College: Central State (Oklahoma)

Career history
- New York Giants (1938)

Awards and highlights
- NFL champion (1938); NFL All-Star Game (1938)

Career statistics
- Receptions: 1
- Receiving yards: 33
- Touchdowns: 0
- Stats at Pro Football Reference

William Charles "Happy" Barnard (March 3, 1915 – June 29, 2008) was a professional American football end in the National Football League (NFL). He played one season for the New York Giants (1938).
