= Leland Shaffer =

American football player (1912–1993)

Profile
- Position: Running back / quarterback

Personal information
- Born: May 9, 1912; Minneola, Kansas, U.S.
- Died: January 24, 1993 (aged 80); Hillsboro Beach, Florida, U.S.
- Listed height: 6 ft 2 in (1.88 m)
- Listed weight: 205 lb (93 kg)

Career information
- High school: Minneola (KS)
- College: Kansas State

Career history
- New York Giants (1935–1945)

Awards and highlights
- NFL champion (1938); NFL All-Star Game (1938)
- Stats at Pro Football Reference

Leland Knoy Shaffer (May 9, 1912 – January 24, 1993) was an American football running back and quarterback for the New York Giants of the National Football League (NFL).

Shaffer appeared as an imposter for the marshal of Dodge City, Kansas on the December 25, 1961 episode of the CBS game show To Tell the Truth. When he revealed his true identity, he said that after his football career ended, he worked in the home construction business.
