= Stan Galazin =

American football player (1915–1989)

No. 34, 55
- Positions: Center, linebacker

Personal information
- Born: December 16, 1909; Nanticoke, Pennsylvania, U.S.
- Died: November 12, 1989 (aged 79); Nanticoke, Pennsylvania, U.S.
- Listed height: 6 ft 3 in (1.91 m)
- Listed weight: 211 lb (96 kg)

Career information
- High school: Keystone Academy (Wyoming, Pennsylvania)
- College: Villanova (1933–1936)
- NFL draft: 1937: undrafted

Career history
- New York Giants (1937–1939); Jersey City Giants (1939–1940)

Awards and highlights
- NFL champion (1938); NFL All-Star Game (1938)
- Stats at Pro Football Reference

Stanley Bernard "Bunny" Galazin (December 16, 1909 – November 12, 1989) was an American professional football center who played three seasons with the New York Giants of the National Football League (NFL). He played college football at Villanova University.

== Early life and college ==
Stanley Bernard Galazin was born on December 16, 1909, in Nanticoke, Pennsylvania. He attended Keystone Academy in Wyoming, Pennsylvania.

Galazin was a member of the Villanova Wildcats of Villanova University from 1933 to 1936 and a three-year letterman from 1934 to 1936.

== Professional career ==
After going undrafted in the 1937 NFL draft, Galazin signed with the New York Giants on August 2, 1937. He played in one game for the Giants during the 1937 season. He appeared in five games in 1938. Galazin also played in the 1938 NFL Championship Game, a 23–17 victory over the Green Bay Packers. On January 15, 1939, the Giants played a team of football All-Stars in the NFL's first-ever All-Star game. He played in three games during the 1939 season before being released in 1939.

Galazin played in five games for the Jersey City Giants of the American Association in 1939 and one game in 1940.

== Personal life ==
Galazin died on November 12, 1989, in his hometown of Nanticoke.
