= John Karcis =

American football player and coach (1908–1973)

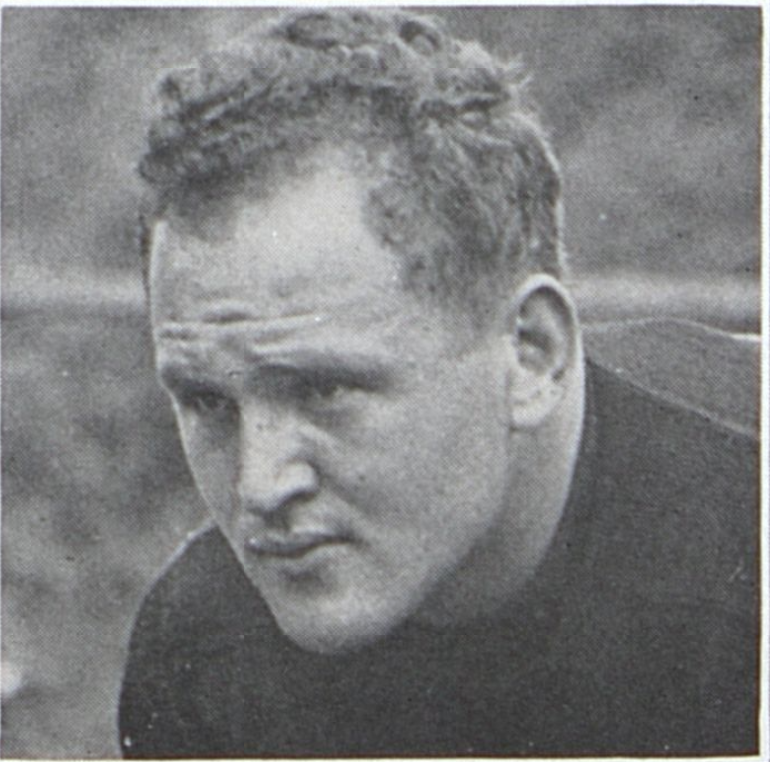
- Karcis at Carnegie Tech, 1928

No. 35, 30, 64, 11, 50
- Position: Fullback

Personal information
- Born: December 3, 1908; Monaca, Pennsylvania, U.S.
- Died: September 4, 1973 (aged 64); Pittsburgh, Pennsylvania, U.S.

Career information
- College: Carnegie Tech

Career history

Playing
- J.P. Rooneys (1931); Brooklyn Dodgers (1932–1935); Pittsburgh Pirates (1936–1938); Patterson Panthers (1938); New York Giants (1938–1939, 1943)

Coaching
- Detroit Lions (1942)

Awards and highlights
- NFL champion (1938); NFL All-Star Game (1938)

Career professional statistics
- Rushing yards: 1,799
- Yards per carry: 3.2
- Touchdowns: 11
- Receptions: 17
- Receiving yards: 152
- Stats at Pro Football Reference

Head coaching record
- Career: 0–8
- Coaching profile at Pro Football Reference

John Karcis (December 3, 1908 – September 4, 1973), sometimes known by the nicknames "Bull" and Johnny "Five Yards", was an American football player and coach. A native of Monaca, Pennsylvania, he played college football as a fullback at Carnegie Tech from 1927 to 1930. He later played professionally in the National Football League (NFL) for the Brooklyn Dodgers, Pittsburgh Pirates, and New York Giants. He ranked third in rushing yardage in the NFL during the 1937 season. He appeared in 89 games over nine years in the NFL, tallying 1,799 yards and 152 receiving yards. Karcis was also the head coach for the Detroit Lions in 1942, compiling a 0–8 record.

== Early life ==
Karcis was born in 1907 at Monaca, Pennsylvania, located 25 miles northwest of Pittsburgh. He attended Monaca High School, where he played football at the tackle position and was selected as a first-team player on the All-Western Pennsylvania Interscholastic Athletic League teams in both 1925 and 1926. In December 1926, John McMahon of The Pittsburgh Press called Karcis "the best lineman in Pennsylvania", "an inspiring leader", and a player with "remarkable speed" who could run 100 yards in 11 seconds.

== Carnegie Tech ==
Karcis enrolled at the Carnegie Institute of Technology in 1927 and played at the fullback position for Carnegie's freshmen football team. He was described in The Pittsburgh Press as a "brilliant" and "gigantic" fullback who hit the line "viciously" and whose "plunging could not be stopped."

As a sophomore, Karcis led the 1928 Carnegie Tech Tartans football team to seven consecutive victories to open the season. Prior to a 1928 game with Carnegie Tech, Notre Dame coach Knute Rockne alerted his team to Karcis' abilities:

They have a fullback named John Karcis who is stronger than Atlas. Karcis grew up eating raw meat and that thick Polish bologna. He just shreds opposing linemen when he carries the ball. That's the man we have to stop!

Despite Rockne's warning, Notre Dame was unable to stop Karcis, as he led Carnegie Tech to a 27–7 victory, the first loss suffered by Notre Dame at their Cartier Field since 1905.

In December 1928, Karcis' father died of pneumonia at the family home in Monaca at age 48.

Karcis continued to play fullback for the Carnegie Tech teams of 1929 and 1930.

In 1931, Karcis played semiprofessional football with the J.P. Rooneys while completing his studies at Carnegie Tech. He sustained a broken leg while playing in his first game for the Rooneys.

== Professional football ==
=== Brooklyn Dodgers ===
In 1932, Karcis signed with the Brooklyn Dodgers of the National Football League (NFL). He spent four years with the Dodgers from 1932 to 1935, appearing in 42 games, 30 as a starter. In 1933 and 1935, Karcis helped the Dodgers to second-place finishes in the NFL Eastern Division. In 1934, he sustained a broken jaw in two places after being struck by an elbow from Turk Edwards. Karcis later recalled:

It's the only time I was ever knocked senseless in a football game. They had a horse doctor who sewed me up. I wasn't even sent to a hospital. For two nights I couldn't sleep.

Karcis was told by a doctor that he would not play football again. However, team owner Dan Topping told Karcis that if he couldn't play, he would not get paid. Karcis couldn't open his mouth to respond to Topping. Adding insult to injury, the Dodgers billed Karcis $250 for the doctor's service; Karcis hired a lawyer and reached an agreement with the Dodgers to pay half of the bill. Faced with losing his pay, Karcis returned to the lineup after missing only two games and being fitted with a specially-constructed face guard.

=== Pittsburgh Pirates ===
Art Rooney had tried to acquire Karcis in 1935, but the deal fell through. In July 1936, Rooney finally closed a deal to purchase Karcis for his Pittsburgh Pirates, as the Steelers were then known. The Pirates had compiled losing records in each of their prior seasons. The 1936 team, with Karcis at fullback, compiled a 6–6 record and finished second in the NFL's Eastern Division. Karcis played for Pittsburgh from 1936 until 1938. In 1937, he rushed for 513 yards, ranking third in the NFL.

After the Pirates lost three straight games to open the 1938 season, head coach Johnny Blood decided to release Karcis, who was being paid the then-hefty sum of $485 per game. Rather than tell Karcis to his face, Blood arranged for Karcis to be given the wrong departure time for the team's train to an exhibition game in Boston. When Karcis arrived at the station, the train carrying the team had already left. Karcis called the team's offices and was told that Blood had released him.

=== New York Giants ===
After his release by the Pirates, Karcis signed with the Patterson Panthers, a minor league club, for $50 per game. Karcis was then signed by the New York Giants on October 5, 1938. After losing two of their first three games, the Giants with Karcis in the lineup did not lose another game and won the NFL championship. In Karcis' home debut as a Giant, he recovered a Philadelphia fumble and returned it 77 yards for a touchdown and also set up the Giants' second touchdown. Karcis scored five touchdowns and tallied 181 rushing yards for the 1938 Giants. He appeared in 20 games for the Giants during the 1938 and 1939 seasons.

== Coaching career ==
After his playing career ended, Karcis attended Slippery Rock State Teachers College where he received sufficient credits to become a high school teacher. In August 1940, he was hired as a teacher and coach at Pitcairn High School in Pitcairn, Pennsylvania.

In July 1942, Karcis was hired as the backfield coach of the Detroit Lions. After the Lions lost the first three games of the 1942 season, team owner Fred L. Mandel Jr. fired head coach Bill Edwards and two of his assistants. Karcis was selected by Mandel to replace Edwards as head coach. Karcis was unable to turn the Lions around, as they lost the remaining eight games of the 1942 season, closing with a 0–11 record. Under Karcis, the Lions were shut out three times and failed to score more than seven points in a game. After the 1942 season, the Lions did not renew Karcis' contract.

In October 1943, Karcis signed with the New York Giants, seeking to make a comeback as a player at age 33. He took a two-month leave of absence from his work as an inspector with the American Bridge Company in Pennsylvania. To supplement his income, he also took a job working afternoons and evenings at a New York war plant. He appeared in eight games for the Giants in 1943, tallying 93 rushing yards on 31 carries (3.0 yards per carry).

In April 1945, Karcis was hired as the football coach at North Catholic High School in the Troy Hill neighborhood of Pittsburgh. He remained at North Catholic through the 1949 season. He returned to coaching in 1957 as the football coach for West Deer High School. He coached the West Deer football team for three years, compiling a 9–21 record. At the end of the 1959 season, he resigned his post at West Deer to join the New Kensington school system. He worked as a math teacher at New Kensington High School.

== Family, later years and legacy ==
Karcis married Frances Taylor, the daughter of John T. Taylor who managed the U.S. Olympic swim teams at the 1924 and 1928 Summer Olympics. Karcis and his wife had two daughters, Alice (born c. 1938) and Joan (born c. 1941).

Karcis was inducted into the Beaver County Sports Hall of Fame.

Karcis died in 1973, age 64, at Presbyterian University Hospital in Pittsburgh. He had been admitted to the hospital for cancer treatment.
