= Orville Tuttle =

American football player and coach (1912–1978)

Profile
- Position: Guard

Personal information
- Born: September 18, 1912; Licking, Missouri, U.S.
- Died: April 20, 1978 (aged 65)

Career information
- High school: Bartlesville (Bartlesville, Oklahoma)
- College: Oklahoma City

Career history

Playing
- New York Giants (1937–1946)

Coaching
- Oklahoma City (1948–1949) (head coach)

Awards and highlights
- NFL champion (1938); 2× NFL All-Star Game (1938, 1939)

Career statistics
- Games played: 60
- Games started: 42
- Stats at Pro Football Reference

James Orville Tuttle (September 18, 1912 – April 20, 1978) was an American football player and coach. He played professionally as guard for six seasons with the New York Giants in the National Football League (NFL). Tuttle played college football at Oklahoma City University. He returned to his alma mater, Oklahoma City, to serve as head football coach during the program's final two years, 1948 and 1949.

== Head coaching record ==
Year	Team	Overall	Bowl/playoffs
Oklahoma City Chiefs (Independent) (1948–1949)
1948	Oklahoma City	4–5–1	L Glass
1949	Oklahoma City	2–8	
Oklahoma City:		6–13–1	
Total:		6–13–1	
