= Alton, Rhode Island =

Village in Richmond, Rhode Island, U.S.

Coordinates: 41°26′15″N 71°43′02″W

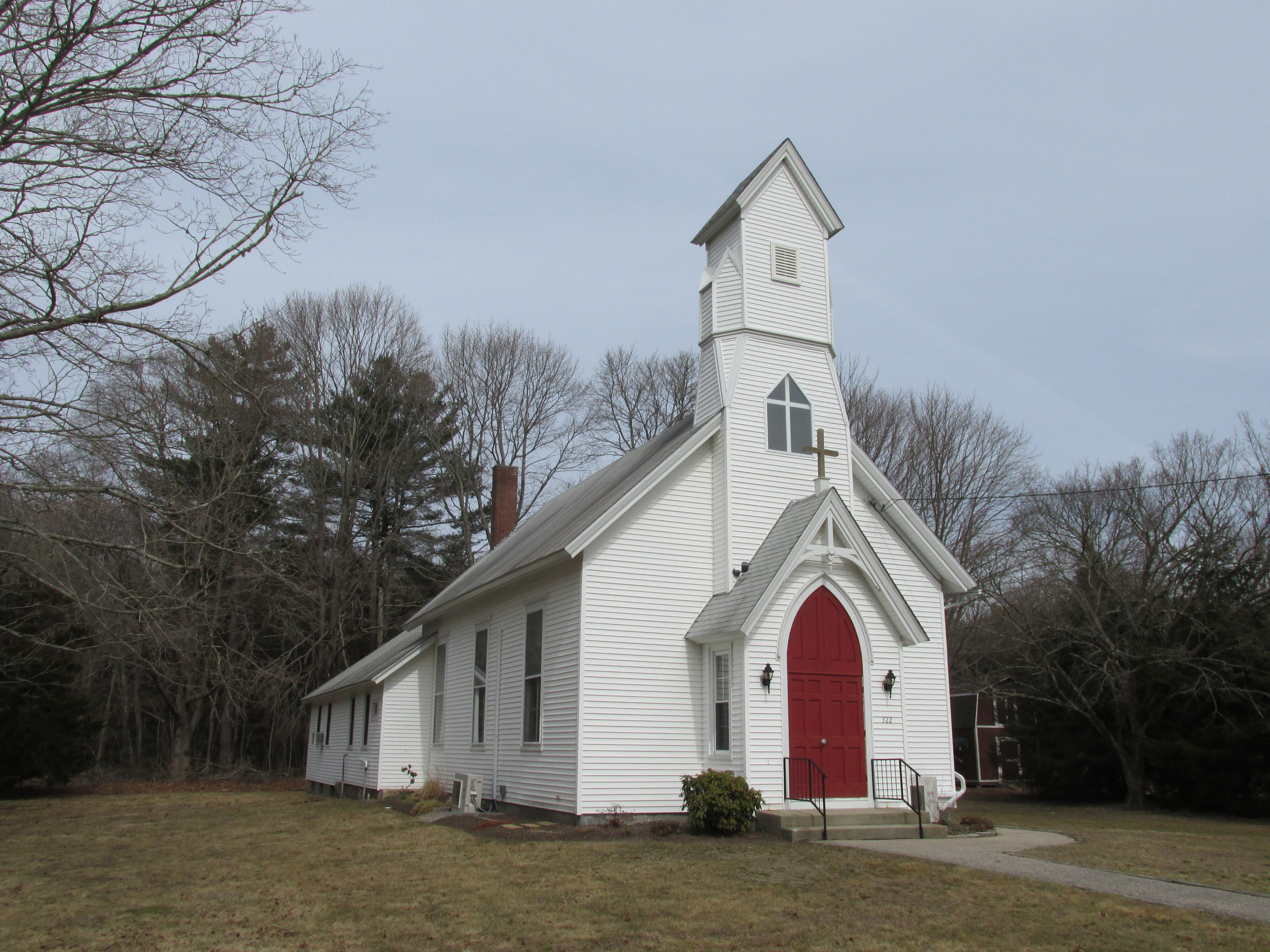
St. Thomas Episcopal Church

Alton is a small village of approximately 250 residents within the town of Richmond, Rhode Island, United States. It is located about one hour south of Providence, the state's capital. The village is primarily residential, with no retail stores. Alton is located at a crossing of the Wood River and is five miles from the Pawcatuck River.

== Local pollution ==
A major employer in the town was Charbert mill, a fabric dye factory located in the center of town. Charbert mill was a division of Narrow Fabrics of America. Though the building still stands, it has been closed for many years.

Residents of Alton have complained about Charbert polluting their air and water since 1978, when a rotten egg smell (hydrogen sulfide) was first perceived. This is primarily due to Charbert's five open-air, unlined lagoons used to treat its wastewater from factory production. As a result, toxins present in the wastewater have seeped into the groundwater, which all residents use for drinking water, and into the air that local residents breathe.

Nineteen homes in Alton had their water tested in 2004 by the Department of Health. Charbert paid for these tests, which considered the levels of 63 different VOCs (volatile organic compound) and MTBE (methyl tert-butyl ether) in the drinking water supply. (Each home has its own private well; there is no public water system.) Three homes were placed on a bottled water supply in response to the test results because their MTBE levels were above health advisory levels. The drinking water supply in four homes on River street that directly face the Charbert factory is tested on a quarterly basis; the other homes have not had their water tested again since 2004.
