= Pete Cole =

American football player (1916–1971)

No. 36, 55
- Position: Guard

Personal information
- Born: May 5, 1916; Stamford, Texas, U.S.
- Died: September 7, 1971 (aged 55); Dallas County, Texas, U.S.
- Listed height: 5 ft 11 in (1.80 m)
- Listed weight: 222 lb (101 kg)

Career information
- High school: Stamford (Texas)
- College: Trinity (TX)
- NFL draft: 1937: undrafted

Career history
- New York Giants (1937–1940)

Awards and highlights
- NFL champion (1938); NFL All-Star Game (1938)
- Stats at Pro Football Reference

Garth Robert Cole (May 5, 1916 – September 7, 1971) was an American professional football guard who played four seasons with the New York Giants of the National Football League (NFL). He played college football at Trinity University.

== Early life and college ==
Garth Robert Cole was born on May 5, 1916, in Stamford, Texas. He attended Stamford High School in Stamford.

Cole was a member of the Trinity Tigers of Trinity University from 1933 to 1936.

== Professional career ==
After going undrafted in the 1937 NFL draft, Cole signed with the New York Giants. He played in two games for the Giants during the 1937 season. He appeared in nine games, starting, one in 1938. Cole also played in the 1938 NFL Championship Game, a 23–17 victory over the Green Bay Packers. On January 15, 1939, the Giants played a team of football All-Stars in the NFL's first-ever All-Star game. Cole played in ten games in 1939. He also appeared in the 1939 NFL Championship Game but the Giants lost 27–0 to the Packers. He played in nine games in 1940.

== Personal life ==
Cole died on September 7, 1971, in Dallas County, Texas.
