= Johnny Gildea =

American football player (1910–1979)

No. 14, 23, 33, 17
- Position: Quarterback

Personal information
- Born: March 9, 1910; Boston Run, Pennsylvania, U.S.
- Died: November 20, 1979 (aged 69); Tamaqua, Pennsylvania, U.S.
- Listed height: 6 ft 2 in (1.88 m)
- Listed weight: 205 lb (93 kg)

Career information
- High school: Coaldale (PA)
- College: St. Bonaventure

Career history
- Pittsburgh Pirates (1935–1937); New York Giants (1938)

Awards and highlights
- NFL champion (1938); NFL All-Star Game (1938)

Career statistics
- Passing attempts: 181
- Passing completions: 51
- Completion percentage: 28.2%
- TD–INT: 5–34
- Passing yards: 964
- Passer rating: 18.9
- Stats at Pro Football Reference

John Thomas Gildea (March 9, 1910 – November 20, 1979) was an American professional football player who was a quarterback, punter and halfback for four seasons in the National Football League (NFL) with the Pittsburgh Steelers and New York Giants.

== Early life ==
Gildea was born in Boston Run, Pennsylvania and attended Coaldale High School, later playing college football for St. Bonaventure University.

== Professional career ==
=== Pittsburgh Pirates ===
Gildea played in 12 games in his first season with the Pirates, starting 10 of them. He threw for two or three touchdowns, depending on the source, and 20 interceptions, which led the league. He also finished third in the league in passing yards, and fifth in completions.

Gildea was used less in the 1936 and 1937 season where he was listed as a tailback. In 1936, he only completed nine passes for 147 yards and one touchdown, while having five more interceptions. In 1937, he passed for 288 yards and two touchdowns, alongside nine interceptions. He was selected second-team All-NFL by the International News Service at the end of the year.

Gildea was also the Pirates' regular punter during his three seasons with the team, sharing duties in his final season with future Hall of Famer Johnny Blood.

=== New York Giants ===
Gildea finished his career with the New York Giants in 1938, where he only recorded two yards on one rushing attempt in nine games, including two starts. Despite the statistics, he was selected to his only Pro Bowl that year. The Giants won the NFL championship that season. Gildea was a non-factor in the championship game, missing his only extra point attempt in the first quarter, while Ward Cuff handled most of the kicking and punting duties.
