= Jim Lee Howell =

American football player and coach (1914–1995)

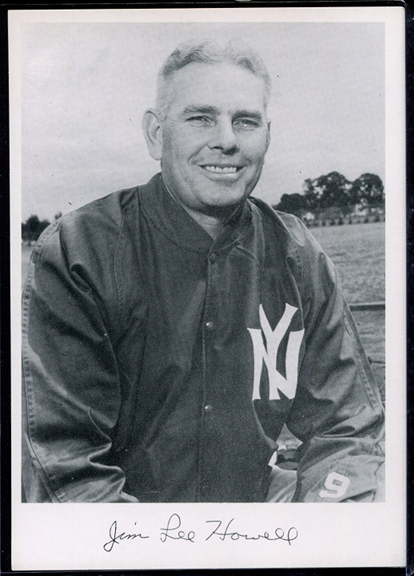
- Howell in 1956

Profile
- Position: End

Personal information
- Born: September 27, 1914; Lonoke, Arkansas, U.S.
- Died: January 4, 1995 (aged 80); Lonoke, Arkansas, U.S.

Career information
- College: Arkansas

Career history

Playing
- New York Giants (1937–1942, 1946–1947)

Coaching
- Wagner (1947–1953); New York Giants (1954–1960)

Awards and highlights
- As player: NFL champion (1938); NFL All-Star Game (1938); As head coach: NFL champion (1956)

Career statistics
- Touchdowns: 7
- Stats at Pro Football Reference

Head coaching record
- Regular season: NFL: 53–27–4 (.655); NCAA: 24–30–3 (.447)
- Postseason: 2–2 (.500)
- Career: 55–27–4 (.663)
- Coaching profile at Pro Football Reference

James Lee Howell (September 27, 1914 – January 4, 1995) was an American professional football player and coach for the New York Giants of the National Football League (NFL). He played college football and basketball at the University of Arkansas.

== Playing career ==
He was drafted by the Giants in the 1937 NFL draft, and played wide receiver and defensive back from 1937 to 1947. While playing for the Giants, he was elected to the Arkansas House of Representatives to represent Lonoke County in 1940 and served one term during the January to March 1941 session of the legislature.

== Coaching career ==
After his playing career ended, he was head coach for Wagner College football.

Howell returned to the Giants in 1954 as head coach, succeeding fan, media, and player favorite Steve Owen after 21 years. Howell quickly hired Vince Lombardi as his offensive coordinator. Shortly afterward, he named punter and defensive back Tom Landry as defensive coordinator, a post which Landry retained after he retired as a player after the 1955 season. From 1954 to 1960, the Giants played in three NFL Championship Games, defeating George Halas's Chicago Bears in 1956 by the score of 47–7.

During Howell's seven seasons as head coach, he earned a career 53–27–4 record, with a .663 winning percentage. He drafted and coached a roster of stars, including six future Pro Football Hall of Famers, Sam Huff, Andy Robustelli, Rosey Brown, Emlen Tunnell, Frank Gifford, and Don Maynard. Although his conservative, defense-oriented style was unpopular with the fans and media, the Giants' success on the field was more satisfying. Several other players from this era went on to become head coaches and broadcasters. His winning percentage of .663 is 12th alltime in NFL history.

Howell played and coached in an era when football went from a relatively simple game, to one of great complexity with schemes, formations, and playbooks designed to deceive as much as over power. With future Hall of Famers Lombardi and Landry as coordinators, Howell's job was frequently to play the diplomat within his own team.

== After football ==
Howell stayed with the team as director of player personnel until his retirement in 1981. He died on January 4, 1995, in Lonoke, Arkansas.

The Professional Football Researchers Association named Howell to the PRFA Hall of Very Good Class of 2007.

Howell appeared on the April 30, 1957, episode of To Tell The Truth posing as a Texas Ranger.

== Head coaching record ==
=== College ===
Year	Team	Overall	Conference	Standing	Bowl/playoffs
Wagner Seahawks (Independent) (1947–1953)
1947	Wagner	4–5			
1948	Wagner	3–3–2			
1949	Wagner	7–1–1			
1950	Wagner	3–6			
1951	Wagner	2–6			
1952	Wagner	3–5			
1953	Wagner	2–4			
Wagner:		24–30–3			
Total:		24–30–3			

=== NFL ===
Team	Year	Regular season					Postseason			
Team	Year	Won	Lost	Ties	Win %	Finish	Won	Lost	Win %	Result
NYG	1954	7	5	0	.583	3rd in NFL Eastern	–	–	–	–
NYG	1955	6	5	1	.545	3rd in NFL Eastern	–	–	–	–
NYG	1956	8	3	1	.727	1st in NFL Eastern	1	0	1.000	Won NFL Championship over Chicago Bears
NYG	1957	7	5	0	.583	2nd in NFL Eastern	–	–	–	–
NYG	1958	9	3	0	.750	1st in NFL Eastern	1	1	.500	Won Eastern Conference Playoff over Cleveland Browns; Lost NFL Championship to Baltimore Colts
NYG	1959	10	2	0	.833	1st in NFL Eastern	0	1	.000	Lost NFL Championship to Baltimore Colts
NYG	1960	6	4	2	.600	3rd in NFL Eastern	–	–	–	–
Total		53	27	4	.663		2	2	.500	-

== See also ==
- History of the New York Giants (1925–1978)
