= Boris Byrd =

American football player (born 1962)

No. 21
- Position: Defensive back

Personal information
- Born: April 15, 1962 (age 64); Warren County, Kentucky, U.S.
- Listed height: 6 ft 0 in (1.83 m)
- Listed weight: 210 lb (95 kg)

Career information
- College: Austin Peay
- NFL draft: 1983: undrafted

Career history
- New York Giants (1987)
- Stats at Pro Football Reference

Boris Kaelin Byrd (born April 15, 1962) is an American former professional football player who was a defensive back in the National Football League (NFL). He played in three games for the New York Giants in the 1987 NFL season. He played college football for the Austin Peay Governs.
