= Hank Soar =

American football player (1914–2001)

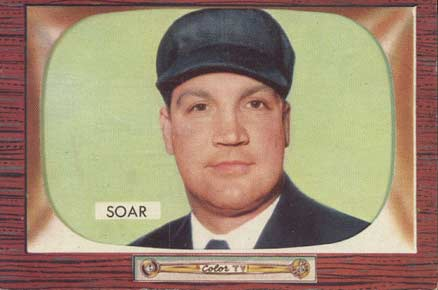

No. 15
- Positions: Running back, defensive back

Personal information
- Born: August 17, 1914; Alton, Rhode Island, U.S.
- Died: December 24, 2001 (aged 87); Pawtucket, Rhode Island, U.S.
- Listed height: 6 ft 2 in (1.88 m)
- Listed weight: 205 lb (93 kg)

Career information
- High school: Pawtucket (RI)
- College: Providence
- NFL draft: 1937: undrafted

Career history
- Boston Shamrocks (1936); New York Giants (1937–1946)

Awards and highlights
- NFL champion (1938); NFL All-Star Game (1938)

Career NFL statistics
- Rushing yards: 1,545
- Rushing average: 3.2
- Receptions: 35
- Receiving yards: 411
- Total touchdowns: 10
- Stats at Pro Football Reference

Albert Henry Soar (August 17, 1914 – December 24, 2001) was an American professional football running back and defensive back in the National Football League (NFL) who went on to have a long career as an umpire in Major League Baseball (MLB). Soar played nine seasons for the New York Giants (1937–1944, 1946), and caught the game-winning touchdown pass in the 1938 NFL Championship Game against the Green Bay Packers at the Polo Grounds.

== Early life and career ==
Soar is featured on the cover of this 1940 Giants game program.

Born in Alton, Rhode Island, Soar later moved to Pawtucket, attending Pawtucket Senior High School (currently William E. Tolman High School) and Providence College. After being named to the Little All-American team, he left college to play semi-pro baseball and pro football, playing for the Boston Shamrocks in 1936. He served in the Army during World War II, and his officiating in a baseball game drew the attention of Philadelphia Athletics manager Connie Mack, who recommended him for an umpiring career. After the war, Soar coached the Providence Steamrollers in the Basketball Association of America (now the NBA) in 1947, but the team achieved only a 2–17 record before he was replaced by Nat Hickey. He then became backfield coach for the football team at Rhode Island State College (also known as the University of Rhode Island) from 1947 to 1949.

== Umpiring career ==
After working in the New England League from 1947 to 1949 and the American Association in 1949, Soar became an American League umpire from 1950 to 1972, and as a league supervisor continued to work occasional games as a substitute through 1975 and in 1977–78. He worked in five World Series (1953, 1956, 1962, 1964 and 1969), serving as crew chief for the '69 Series between the New York Mets and the Baltimore Orioles, one of the most famous of all time.

== Notable games ==
Soar was also the first base umpire when Don Larsen of the New York Yankees pitched a perfect game in Game 5 of the 1956 Series, and was again at first base on June 1, 1975, when Nolan Ryan of the California Angels pitched his fourth no-hitter to tie Sandy Koufax's major league record. Soar also officiated in four All-Star Games (1952, 1955, second 1959 game, 1963), calling balls and strikes for the last contest, as well as the 1971 American League Championship Series, when he again served as crew chief.

In 1941, Soar made a bit of history as one of the first two players ever to be fined by the NFL's league office when commissioner Elmer Layden in August assessed $25 fines on Soar and Green Bay Packers quarterback Larry Craig for fighting.

== Death ==
Soar died at age 87 at a family home in Pawtucket, Rhode Island, and was buried in Swan Point Cemetery in Providence. He has a memorial marker at Slater Park in Pawtucket next to the tennis courts. The athletic complex on Prospect Street in Pawtucket is named after him.

== Head coaching record ==
Legend
Regular season	G	Games coached	W	Games won	L	Games lost	W–L %	Win–loss %
Playoffs	PG	Playoff games	PW	Playoff wins	PL	Playoff losses	PW–L %	Playoff win–loss %

Team	Year	G	W	L	W–L%	Finish	PG	PW	PL	PW–L%	Result
Providence	1947–48	19	2	17	.105	(replaced)	—	—	—	—	—

== See also ==
- List of Major League Baseball umpires (disambiguation)
