= Len Barnum =

American football player (1912–1998)

No. 10, 13
- Position: Quarterback

Personal information
- Born: September 18, 1912; Parkersburg, West Virginia, U.S.
- Died: November 24, 1998 (aged 86); Columbia City, Indiana, U.S.
- Listed height: 6 ft 0 in (1.83 m)
- Listed weight: 200 lb (91 kg)

Career information
- High school: Parkersburg
- College: West Virginia Wesleyan (1932-1935)
- NFL draft: 1936: 2nd round, 12th overall pick

Career history

Playing
- New York Giants (1938–1940); Philadelphia Eagles (1941–1942)

Coaching
- Fort Wayne Warriors (1965) Assistant coach

Awards and highlights
- NFL champion (1938)

Career NFL statistics
- TD–INT: 6–15
- Passing yards: 602
- QB rating: 26.5
- Stats at Pro Football Reference

Leonard Warner "Feets" Barnum (September 18, 1912 – November 24, 1998) was an American professional football player who was a quarterback in the National Football League (NFL) for the New York Giants and Philadelphia Eagles. He was the first and only quarterback selected in the inaugural NFL draft in 1936.

== Early life and education ==
Barnum attended West Virginia Wesleyan College. He served in the United States Navy during the World War II era.
