= 1938 NFL Championship Game =

Coordinates: 40.831°N 73.937°W

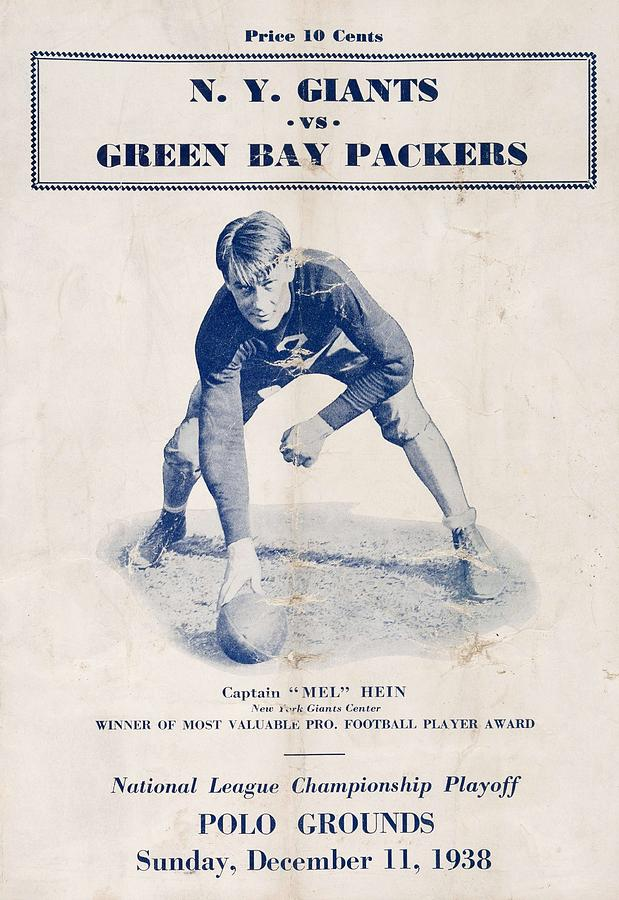
Green Bay Packers (Western) (8–3)	New York Giants (Eastern) (8–2–1)
17	23
Head coach: Curly Lambeau	Head coach: Steve Owen
	1	2	3	4	Total
GB	0	14	3	0	17
NYG	9	7	7	0	23
- Date: December 11, 1938
- Stadium: Polo Grounds; Manhattan, New York
- Attendance: 48,120

Location in the United States

The 1938 NFL Championship Game was the sixth championship game played in the National Football League (NFL). It was played on December 11 at the Polo Grounds in New York City, with an attendance of 48,120, a record crowd for a title game.

The game matched the New York Giants (8–2–1), champions of the Eastern Division, against the Western Division champion Green Bay Packers (8–3–0). The Giants had won the regular season game with Green Bay 15–3 at the Polo Grounds three weeks earlier on November 20, but Green Bay was without hall of fame end Don Hutson; there was no clear favorite for the title game.

This was the Giants' fourth championship game appearance, their previous victory was in the famous "Sneakers game" of 1934 and they were runners-up in 1933 and 1935. It was the Packers' second trip, winning in 1936. New York also won the 1927 NFL title when the championship was awarded to the team with the best season record. Green Bay had similarly won three straight league titles in 1929, 1930, and 1931.

End and future Giants head coach Jim Lee Howell blocked a punt after the Packers opening drive to set up a Ward Cuff field goal. The Giants blocked a second punt in the first quarter to set up a touchdown run by Tuffy Leemans and a 9-0 first quarter lead. The 9 points caused by the two blocked punts would ultimately decide the championship.

At halftime, Packers head coach Curly Lambeau accidentally made a wrong turn going to the team's locker room and walked out of the Polo Grounds, locking himself out. Hurrying to the front gate, Lambeau tried to get back into the Grounds, but the guards at the gate believed Lambeau was a random fan and refused him entry. As Lambeau loudly protested, a couple of sportswriters inside heard the commotion, and identified Lambeau; the guards allowed him back in, by which time halftime was nearly over.

After trailing by two points at halftime, Green Bay took the lead in the third quarter with a short field goal, but New York responded with a touchdown and held on through a scoreless fourth quarter to win, 23–17.

With the victory, the Giants became the first team to win two Championship Games since the league was split into two divisions in 1933. The two teams met again in the Championship Game the following year in Milwaukee, Wisconsin, with the Packers winning 27–0. Ed Danowski became the first Giants starting quarterback to win two NFL Championships for the team (the other is Eli Manning).

The Giants' next title was in 1956, and was won at Yankee Stadium.

== Scoring summary ==
Sunday, December 11, 1938
Kickoff: 2 p.m. EST

- First quarter
  - NYG – FG Ward Cuff 14, 3–0 NYG
  - NYG – Leemans 6 run (Johnny Gildea kick failed), 9–0 NYG
- Second quarter
  - GB – Carl Mulleneaux 40 pass from Arnie Herber (Tiny Engebretsen kick), 9–7 NYG
  - NYG – Barnard 21 pass from Ed Danowski (Cuff kick), 16–7 NYG
  - GB – Clarke Hinkle 1 run (Engebretsen kick), 16–14 NYG
- Third quarter
  - GB – FG Engebretsen 15, 17–16 GB
  - NYG – Hank Soar 23 pass from Danowski (Cuff kick), 23–17 NYG
- Fourth quarter
  - no scoring

== Officials ==
- Referee: Bobby Cahn
- Umpire: Tom Thorp
- Head linesman: Larry Conover
- Field judge: L.C. Meyer

The NFL had only four game officials in 1938; the back judge was added in 1947, the line judge in 1965, and the side judge in 1978.

== Players' shares ==
The victory earned each winning Giant player $504 and each Packer $368.

== See also ==
- Giants–Packers rivalry
