= 1944 New York Giants season =

NFL team 20th season

- Owner: John V. Mara
- Head coach: Steve Owen
- Home stadium: Polo Grounds

Results
- Record: 8–1–1
- Division place: 1st NFL Eastern
- Playoffs: Lost NFL Championship (vs. Packers) 7–14

The 1944 New York Giants season was the franchise's 20th season in the National Football League.

In an April 2013 article, football analytics website Cold Hard Football Facts named the 1944 Giants the "Stingiest Defense in NFL history," as the team only surrendered 75 points in ten games. "The manpower shortage on NFL fields created a variety of statistical anomalies on both sides of the field," said the article, "and the 1944 Giants are no exception. But even then, the 1944 Giants were a truly awesome unit: the average team scored 18.0 points per game in 1944, well above the 7.5 PPG average surrendered by the Giants. But even the best defenses can’t get it done alone: Giants quarterback Arnie Herber threw four interceptions in New York's 14–7 NFL title game loss to Herber's former team, the Packers. The 1944 Giants were a mere No. 5 in scoring offense in the 10-team NFL."

== Schedule ==
Game	Date	Opponent	Result	Record	Venue	Attendance	Recap	Sources
1	October 8	at **Boston Yanks**	**W** 22–10	1–0	Fenway Park	17,463	Recap	
2	October 15	at **Brooklyn Tigers**	**W** 14–7	2–0	Ebbets Field	24,854	Recap	
3	October 22	Card-Pitt	**W** 23–0	3–0	Polo Grounds	40,734	Recap	
4	October 29	**Philadelphia Eagles**	**L** 17–24	3–1	Polo Grounds	42,639	Recap	
5	November 5	**Boston Yanks**	**W** 31–0	4–1	Polo Grounds	28,364	Recap	
6	November 12	at **Philadelphia Eagles**	**T** 21–21	4–1–1	Shibe Park	33,248	Recap	
7	November 19	Green Bay Packers	**W** 24–0	5–1–1	Polo Grounds	56,481	Recap	
8	November 26	**Brooklyn Tigers**	**W** 7–0	6–1–1	Polo Grounds	29,387	Recap	
9	December 3	**Washington Redskins**	**W** 16–13	7–1–1	Polo Grounds	47,457	Recap	
10	December 10	at **Washington Redskins**	**W** 31–0	8–1–1	Griffith Stadium	35,540	Recap	
Note: Intra-division opponents are in **bold** text.

== Standings ==
Program for the October 29 game against the visiting Philadelphia Eagles. It would be New York's only loss of the year.

NFL Eastern Division
	W	L	T	PCT	DIV	PF	PA	STK
New York Giants	8	1	1	.889	6–1–1	206	75	W4
Philadelphia Eagles	7	1	2	.875	6–0–2	267	131	W2
Washington Redskins	6	3	1	.667	4–3–1	169	180	L2
Boston Yanks	2	8	0	.200	2–6	82	233	L2
Brooklyn Tigers	0	10	0	.000	0–8	69	166	L10

Note: Tie games were not officially counted in the standings until 1972.

== Game summaries ==
=== Game 1: at Boston Yanks ===
Week Four: New York Giants at Boston Yanks

Quarter	1	2	3	4	Total
Giants	0	10	12	0	22
Yanks	3	0	7	0	10

at Fenway Park, Boston, Massachusetts

- Date: October 8
- Game attendance: 17,463

Game information

First quarter

- BOS Augie Lio 47-yard FG

Second quarter

- NYG Howie Livingston 38-yard run (Ken Strong kick)
- NYG Strong 36-yard FG

Third quarter

- NYG Safety, George Cafego tackled in end zone
- BOS John Morelli 40-yard fumble return (Lio kick)
- NYG Vic Carroll 28-yard blocked punt return (Strong kick)
- NYG Strong 16-yard FG

=== Game 2: at Brooklyn Tigers ===
Week Five: New York Giants at Brooklyn Tigers

Quarter	1	2	3	4	Total
Giants	0	7	0	7	14
Tigers	0	7	0	0	7

at Ebbets Field, Brooklyn, New York

- Date: October 15
- Game attendance: 24,854

Game information

Second quarter

- BRK Rocky Uguccioni 12-yard blocked punt return (Bruiser Kinard kick)
- NYG Frank Liebel 26-yard pass from Hank Soar (Strong kick)

Fourth quarter

- NYG Neal Adams 35-yard pass from Soar (Strong kick)

=== Game 3: vs Cardinals-Pittsburgh Combine ===
Week Six: Cardinals-Pittsburgh at New York Giants

Quarter	1	2	3	4	Total
Card-Pitt	0	0	0	0	0
Giants	0	9	7	7	23

at Polo Grounds, New York, New York

- Date: October 22
- Game attendance: 40,734

Game information

Second quarter

- NYG Bill Paschal 4-yard run (Strong kick)
- NYG Safety, John McCarthy punt blocked out of end zone

Third quarter

- NYG Paschal 3-yard run (Strong kick)

Fourth quarter

- NYG Paschal 45-yard run (Ward Cuff kick)

=== Game 4: vs. Philadelphia Eagles ===
Week Seven: Philadelphia Eagles at New York Giants

Quarter	1	2	3	4	Total
Eagles	3	7	7	7	24
Giants	7	10	0	0	17

at Polo Grounds, New York, New York

- Date: October 29
- Game attendance: 42,639

Game information

First quarter

- PHI Roy Zimmerman 22-yard FG
- NYG Liebel 63-yard fumble return (Strong kick)

Second quarter

- NYG Strong 26-yard FG
- NYG Paschal 68-yard run (Cuff kick)
- PHI Steve Van Buren 6-yard run (Zimmerman kick)

Third quarter

- PHI Zimmerman 15-yard pass from Zimmerman (Zimmerman kick)

Fourth quarter

- PHI Zimmerman 1-yard run (Zimmerman kick)

=== Game 5: vs. Boston Yanks ===
Week Eight: Boston Yanks at New York Giants

Quarter	1	2	3	4	Total
Yanks	0	0	0	0	0
Giants	10	0	14	7	31

at Polo Grounds, New York, New York

- Date: November 5
- Game attendance: 28,364

Game information

First quarter

- NYG Len Calligaro 1-yard run (Strong kick)
- NYG Strong 38-yard FG

Third quarter

- NYG Cuff 40-yard pass from Joe Sulaitis (Strong kick)
- NYG Paschal 18-yard run (Strong kick)

Fourth quarter

- NYG Bill Petrilas 67-yard interception return (Strong kick)

=== Game 6: at Philadelphia Eagles ===
Week Nine: New York Giants at Philadelphia Eagles

Quarter	1	2	3	4	Total
Giants	7	0	0	14	21
Eagles	7	7	7	0	21

at Shibe Park, Philadelphia, Pennsylvania

- Date: November 12
- Game attendance: 33,248

Game information

First quarter

- NYG Paschal 1-yard run (Strong kick)
- PHI Steve Van Buren 97-yard kickoff return (Zimmerman kick)

Second quarter

- PHI Mel Bleeker 9-yard pass from Zimmerman (Zimmerman kick)

Third quarter

- PHI Bleeker 48-yard pass from Zimmerman (Zimmerman kick)

Fourth quarter

- NYG Livingston 12-yard pass from Arnie Herber (Strong kick)
- NYG Liebel 58-yard pass from Herber (Strong kick)

=== Game 7: vs. Green Bay Packers ===
Week Ten: Green Bay Packers at New York Giants

Quarter	1	2	3	4	Total
Packers	0	0	0	0	0
Giants	7	7	3	7	24

at Polo Grounds, New York, New York

- Date: November 19
- Game attendance: 56,481

Game information

First quarter

- NYG Livingston 34-yard interception return (Strong kick)

Second quarter

- NYG Liebel 36-yard pass from Herber (Strong kick)

Third quarter

- NYG Strong 8-yard FG

Fourth quarter

- NYG Paschal 1-yard run (Strong kick)

Steve Owen won his 100th regular season game as Giants head coach. Tom Coughlin would be the next to accomplish the feat 61 years later.

=== Game 8: vs. Brooklyn Tigers ===
Week Eleven: Brooklyn Tigers at New York Giants

Quarter	1	2	3	4	Total
Tigers	0	0	0	0	0
Giants	7	0	0	0	7

at Polo Grounds, New York, New York

- Date: November 26
- Game attendance: 29,387

Game information

First quarter

- NYG Paschal 1-yard run (Strong kick)

=== Game 9: vs. Washington Redskins ===
Week Twelve: Washington Redskins at New York Giants

Quarter	1	2	3	4	Total
Redskins	0	10	3	0	13
Giants	10	0	0	6	16

at Polo Grounds, New York, New York

- Date: December 3
- Game attendance: 47,457

Game information

First quarter

- NYG Petrilas 24-yard interception return (Strong kick)
- NYG Strong 17-yard FG

Second quarter

- WAS Wilbur Moore 9-yard pass from Sammy Baugh (Joe Aguirre kick)
- WAS Aguirre 43-yard FG

Third quarter

- WAS Aguirre 7-yard FG

Fourth quarter

- NYG Paschal 2-yard run (conversion failed)

=== Game 10: at Washington Redskins ===
Week Thirteen: New York Giants at Washington Redskins

Quarter	1	2	3	4	Total
Giants	14	0	7	10	31
Redskins	0	0	0	0	0

at Griffith Stadium, Washington, D.C.

- Date: December 10
- Game attendance: 35,540

Game information

First quarter

- NYG Cuff 22-yard pass from Herber (Strong kick)
- NYG Liebel 11-yard pass from Herber (Strong kick)

Third quarter

- NYG Liebel 44-yard pass from Herber (Strong kick)

Fourth quarter

- NYG Cuff 32-yard FG
- NYG Chuck Avedisian 48-yard interception return (Strong kick)

== Post-season ==
Round	Date	Opponent	Result	Venue	Attendance	Recap	Sources
Championship	December 17	Green Bay Packers	L 7–14	Polo Grounds	46,015	Recap	

=== 1944 NFL Championship: Green Bay Packers at New York Giants ===
1944 NFL Championship: Green Bay Packers at New York Giants

Quarter	1	2	3	4	Total
Packers	0	14	0	0	14
Giants	0	0	0	7	7

at Polo Grounds, New York, New York

- Date: December 17
- Game attendance: 46,015

Game information

Second quarter

- GB Ted Fritsch 1-yard run (Hutson kick)
- GB Fritsch 28-yard pass from Comp (Hutson kick)

Fourth quarter

- NYG Cuff 1-yard run (Strong kick)

Top passers

- GB – Irv Comp – 3/10, 73 YDS, TD, 3 INT
- NYG – Arnie Herber – 8/22, 117 YDS, 4 INT

Top rushers

- GB – Joe Laws – 13 CAR, 74 YDS
- NYG – Ward Cuff – 12 CAR, 55 YDS, TD

Top receivers

- GB – Don Hutson – 2 REC, 47 YDS
- NYG – Frank Liebel – 3 REC, 71 YDS

== Roster ==
1944 New York Giants final roster
Backs: 42 Hub Barker RB/S; 44 Keith Beebe RB/S/P; 2 Len Calligaro RB/S; 21 Roy Clay RB/CB; 14 Ward Cuff RB/CB/K; 20 Arnie Herber RB/CB; 25 Carl Kinscherf FB/LB; 24 Howie Livingston FB/LB; 8 Bill Paschal FB/LB; 5 Bill Petrilas RB/CB; 37 Joe Sulaitis RB/CB	Linemen/Linebackers: 55 Chuck Avedisian G/DG; 32 Al Blozis T/DT; 70 Roland Caranci T/DT; 26 Vic Carroll T/DT; 36 Frank Cope T/DT; 7 Mel Hein C/LB; 39 Herb Kane T/DT; 29 Bill Piccolo C/LB; 33 Jim Sivell G/DG; 69 Frank Umont G/DG; 31 Larry Visnic G/DG; 60 Len Younce G/DG	Ends/Receivers: 30 O'Neal Adams; 85 Verlin Adams; 22 Frank Liebel; 11 Johnny Weiss; Special teams: 50 Ken Strong K; Reserve: Win Pedersen T/DT (Military); rookies in italics

== See also ==
- List of New York Giants seasons
