= 1945 New York Giants season =

NFL team 21st season

- Head coach: Steve Owen
- Home stadium: Polo Grounds

Results
- Record: 3–6–1
- Division place: 3rd (tied) NFL Eastern
- Playoffs: Did not qualify

The 1945 New York Giants season marked the franchise's 21st season in the National Football League (NFL).

== Schedule ==
Game	Date	Opponent	Result	Record	Venue	Attendance	Recap	Sources
1	October 7	at **Pittsburgh Steelers**	**W** 34–6	1–0	Forbes Field	20,097	Recap	
2	October 14	at **Boston Yanks**	**T** 13–13	1–0–1	Yankee Stadium	30,988	Recap	
3	October 21	**Pittsburgh Steelers**	**L** 7–21	1–1–1	Polo Grounds	43,070	Recap	
4	October 28	**Washington Redskins**	**L** 14–24	1–2–1	Polo Grounds	55,461	Recap	
5	November 4	Cleveland Rams	**L** 17–21	1–3–1	Polo Grounds	46,219	Recap	
6	November 11	at **Philadelphia Eagles**	**L** 17–38	1–4–1	Shibe Park	30,047	Recap	
7	November 18	Detroit Lions	**W** 35–14	2–4–1	Polo Grounds	38,215	Recap	
8	November 25	Green Bay Packers	**L** 14–23	2–5–1	Polo Grounds	52,681	Recap	
9	December 2	**Philadelphia Eagles**	**W** 28–21	3–5–1	Polo Grounds	45,372	Recap	
10	December 9	at **Washington Redskins**	**L** 0–17	3–6–1	Griffith Stadium	34,788	Recap	
Note: Intra-division opponents are in **bold** text.

== Roster ==
1945 New York Giants final roster
Backs: 6 Elmer Barbour RB/S; 14 Ward Cuff RB/CB; 19 Jack Doolan RB/CB; 34 Steve Filipowicz FB/LB; 5 George Franck RB/CB/P; 20 Arnie Herber RB/CB; 43 Junie Hovious RB/CB; 24 Howie Livingston RB/CB/P; 8 Bill Paschal FB/LB; 18 Bill Petrilas RB/CB/S; 4 Leland Shaffer RB/S; 37 Joe Sulaitis RB/S	Linemen/Linebackers: 28 Verlin Adams G/DG; 36 Frank Cope T/DT; 10 Lou DeFilippo T/DT; 17 Carl Grate G/DG; 7 Mel Hein C/LB; 39 Herb Kane T/DT; 15 Win Pedersen T/DT; 39 Phil Ragazzo T/DT; 33 Jim Sivell G/DG; 55 Army Tomaini T/DT; 69 Frank Umont G/DG; 31 Larry Visnic G/DG; 12 Art White G/DG	Ends/Receivers: 70 Sammy Fox; 22 Frank Liebel; 23 Buster Poole; 27 Hal Springer; 11 Johnny Weiss; Special teams: 50 Ken Strong K; Reserve: 26 Vic Carroll T/DT; rookies in italics

== Standings ==
Program for the December 2 game against the Philadelphia Eagles.

NFL Eastern Division
	W	L	T	PCT	DIV	PF	PA	STK
Washington Redskins	8	2	0	.800	6–2	209	121	W2
Philadelphia Eagles	7	3	0	.700	5–2	272	133	W1
Yanks	3	6	1	.333	3–2–1	123	211	L5
New York Giants	3	6	1	.333	2–4–1	179	198	L1
Pittsburgh Steelers	2	8	0	.200	1–7	79	220	L3

Note: Tie games were not officially counted in the standings until 1972.

== See also ==
- List of New York Giants seasons
