= List of New York Giants seasons =

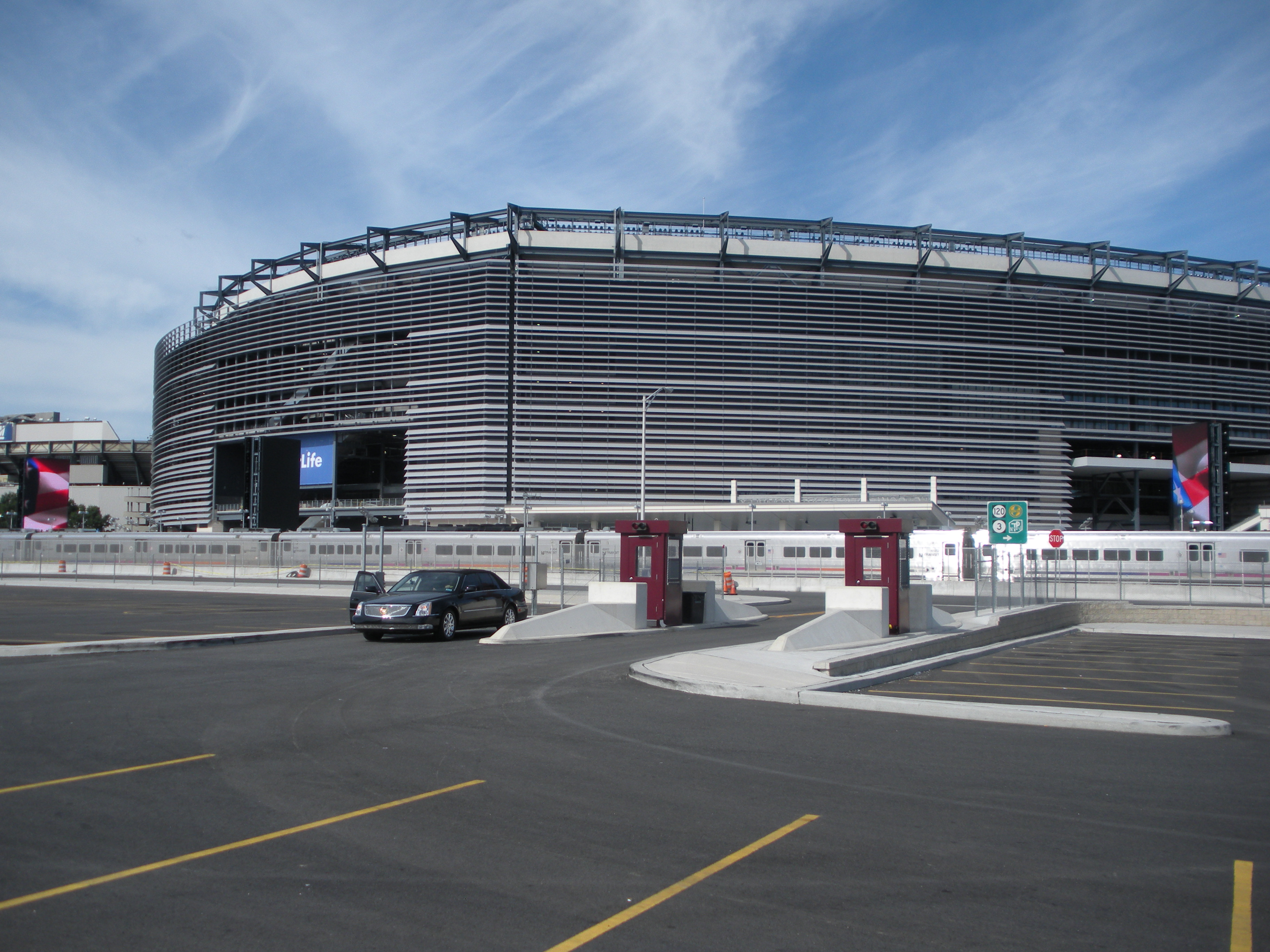
MetLife Stadium, the current home stadium of the New York Giants.

The New York Giants are an American football team based in East Rutherford, New Jersey. They are a member of the National Football League (NFL) and play in the NFL's National Football Conference (NFC) East division. In 101 completed seasons, the franchise has won eight NFL championships, including four Super Bowl victories. The Giants have won more than 700 games and appeared in the NFL playoffs 33 times. Though the Giants play home games in East Rutherford, they draw fans from throughout the New York metropolitan area. In 2010, the team began playing in MetLife Stadium, formerly New Meadowlands Stadium.

After Tim Mara paid $500 for the franchise, the Giants joined the NFL in the 1925 season and won their first championship two years later. In 1934, the team won its second title, defeating the Chicago Bears in the NFL Championship Game. The Giants won another championship four years later, and made four appearances in the NFL Championship Game from 1939 to 1946, losing each time. New York won its fourth NFL title in 1956, with a 47–7 win over the Bears in the championship game. From 1958 to 1963, the Giants reached the NFL Championship Game five times, but were defeated on each occasion. Following the 1963 season, the franchise did not return to the playoffs until 1981, only finishing .500 or better five times during the postseason drought.

Behind the defensive play of Lawrence Taylor and the coaching of Bill Parcells, the team won Super Bowl XXI at the end of the 1986 season, giving the team its first championship in 30 years. The Giants won their second Super Bowl four years later, defeating the Buffalo Bills 20–19 in Super Bowl XXV. In the 2000 season, New York returned to the Super Bowl, but lost to the Baltimore Ravens 34–7. The 2007 season saw the Giants win their seventh NFL championship by defeating the New England Patriots 17–14 in Super Bowl XLII. The victory by the Giants prevented a perfect 19–0 season by the Patriots and is widely regarded as one of the greatest upsets in Super Bowl history. After a run of four consecutive appearances in the playoffs from 2005 to 2008, the Giants returned to the Super Bowl in the 2011 playoffs, where they defeated the Patriots 21–17 in a rematch for their eighth title. Since 2012, the Giants have only made the playoffs twice with 11 losing seasons in that timespan.

== Table key ==
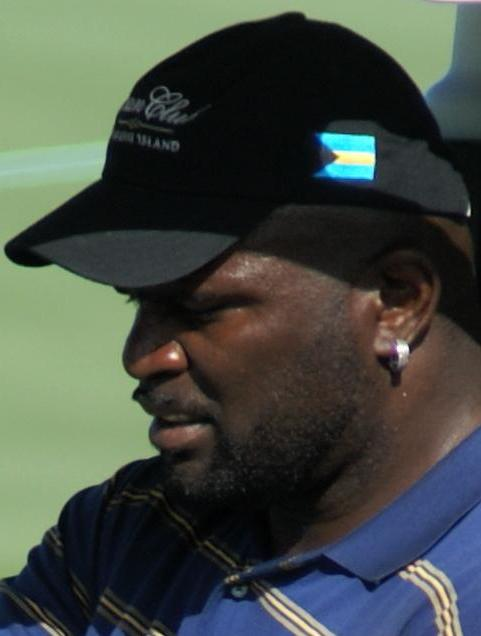
Linebacker Lawrence Taylor helped the Giants win two Super Bowls and was the 1986 NFL Most Valuable Player.

BBA	Bert Bell Award
EOY	NFL Executive of the Year Award
Finish	Final position in league, division, or conference
Losses	Number of regular season losses
NFC POY	United Press International NFC Player of the Year
NFL COY	National Football League Coach of the Year Award
NFL CPOY	National Football League Comeback Player of the Year Award
NFL DPOY	National Football League Defensive Player of the Year Award
NFL DROY	National Football League Defensive Rookie of the Year Award
NFL MVP	National Football League Most Valuable Player Award
NFL OROY	National Football League Offensive Rookie of the Year Award
NFL WPMOY	Walter Payton NFL Man of the Year Award
OT	Game was decided in overtime
Pro Bowl MVP	Pro Bowl Most Valuable Player Award
Season	Each year is linked to an article about that particular NFL season
Super Bowl MVP	Super Bowl Most Valuable Player Award
Team	Each year is linked to an article about that particular Giants season
Ties	Number of regular season ties
UPI NFC ROY	UPI NFL-NFC Rookie of the Year
Wins	Number of regular season wins

== Seasons ==
NFL champions (1920–1969) †	Super Bowl champions (1966–present) ‡	Conference champions *	Division champions +	Wild Card berth #	One-game playoff berth ^

New York Giants yearly win–loss records, with division standings, playoff results, award winners, and head coaches
Season	Team	League	Conference	Division	Regular season				Postseason results	Awards	Head coaches
Season	Team	League	Conference	Division	Finish	W	L	T	Postseason results	Awards	Head coaches
1925	1925	NFL	—	—	4th	8	4	0	—	—	Bob Folwell
1926	1926	NFL	—	—	7th	8	4	1	—	—	Doc Alexander
1927	1927	NFL †	—	—	1st	11	1	1	Named NFL Champions (1)^{[A]} †	—	Earl Potteiger
1928	1928	NFL	—	—	6th	4	7	2	—	—	Earl Potteiger
1929	1929	NFL	—	—	2nd	13	1	1	—	—	LeRoy Andrews
1930	1930	NFL	—	—	2nd	13	4	0	—	—	LeRoy Andrews (11–4) Benny Friedman & Steve Owen (2–0)
1931	1931	NFL	—	—	5th	7	6	1	—	—	Steve Owen
1932	1932	NFL	—	—	5th	4	6	2	—	—	Steve Owen
1933	1933	NFL	—	East^{[B]} +	1st +	11	3	0	Lost NFL Championship (at Bears) 21–23	—	Steve Owen
1934	1934	NFL †	—	East +	1st +	8	5	0	Won NFL Championship (2) (Bears) 30–13 †	—	Steve Owen
1935	1935	NFL	—	East +	1st +	9	3	0	Lost NFL Championship (at Lions) 7–26	—	Steve Owen
1936	1936	NFL	—	East	3rd	5	6	1	—	—	Steve Owen
1937	1937	NFL	—	East	2nd	6	3	2	—	—	Steve Owen
1938	1938	NFL †	—	East +	1st +	8	2	1	Won NFL Championship (3) (Packers) 23–17 †	Mel Hein (NFL MVP)	Steve Owen
1939	1939	NFL	—	East +	1st +	9	1	1	Lost NFL Championship (at Packers) 0–27	—	Steve Owen
1940	1940	NFL	—	East	3rd	6	4	1	—	—	Steve Owen
1941	1941	NFL	—	East +	1st +	8	3	0	Lost NFL Championship (at Bears) 9–37	—	Steve Owen
1942	1942	NFL	—	East	3rd	5	5	1	—	—	Steve Owen
1943	1943	NFL	—	East	2nd ^	6	3	1	Lost Divisional playoff (Redskins) 0–28	—	Steve Owen
1944	1944	NFL	—	East +	1st +	8	1	1	Lost NFL Championship (Packers) 7–14	—	Steve Owen
1945	1945	NFL	—	East	T-3rd	3	6	1	—	—	Steve Owen
1946	1946	NFL	—	East +	1st +	7	3	1	Lost NFL Championship (Bears) 14–24	—	Steve Owen
1947	1947	NFL	—	East	5th	2	8	2	—	—	Steve Owen
1948	1948	NFL	—	East	T-3rd	4	8	0	—	—	Steve Owen
1949	1949	NFL	—	East	3rd	6	6	0	—	—	Steve Owen
1950	1950	NFL	American^{[C]}	—	2nd ^	10	2	0	Lost Conference playoff (at Browns) 3–8	—	Steve Owen
1951	1951	NFL	American	—	2nd	9	2	1	—	—	Steve Owen
1952	1952	NFL	American	—	T-2nd	7	5	0	—	—	Steve Owen
1953	1953	NFL	Eastern	—	5th	3	9	0	—	—	Steve Owen
1954	1954	NFL	Eastern	—	3rd	7	5	0	—	—	Jim Lee Howell
1955	1955	NFL	Eastern	—	3rd	6	5	1	—	—	Jim Lee Howell
1956	1956	NFL †	Eastern *	—	1st *	8	3	1	Won NFL Championship (4) (Bears) 47–7 †	Frank Gifford (NFL MVP)	Jim Lee Howell
1957	1957	NFL	Eastern	—	2nd	7	5	0	—	—	Jim Lee Howell
1958	1958	NFL	Eastern *	—	1st *	9	3	0	Won Conference playoff (Browns) 10–0; Lost NFL Championship (Colts) 17–23 (OT)^{[D]} *	Frank Gifford (Pro Bowl MVP)	Jim Lee Howell
1959	1959	NFL	Eastern *	—	1st *	10	2	0	Lost NFL Championship (at Colts) 16–31 *	—	Jim Lee Howell
1960	1960	NFL	Eastern	—	3rd	6	4	2	—	Sam Huff (Pro Bowl MVP)	Jim Lee Howell
1961	1961	NFL	Eastern *	—	1st *	10	3	1	Lost NFL Championship (at Packers) 0–37 *	Allie Sherman (NFL COY)	Allie Sherman
1962	1962	NFL	Eastern *	—	1st *	12	2	0	Lost NFL Championship (Packers) 7–16 *	Y. A. Tittle (NFL MVP); Allie Sherman (NFL COY); Andy Robustelli (BBA)	Allie Sherman
1963	1963	NFL	Eastern *	—	1st *	11	3	0	Lost NFL Championship (at Bears) 10–14 *	Y. A. Tittle (NFL MVP)	Allie Sherman
1964	1964	NFL	Eastern	—	7th	2	10	2	—	—	Allie Sherman
1965	1965	NFL	Eastern	—	T-2nd	7	7	0	—	—	Allie Sherman
1966	1966	NFL	Eastern	—	8th	1	12	1	—	—	Allie Sherman
1967	1967	NFL	Eastern	Century	2nd	7	7	0	—	—	Allie Sherman
1968	1968	NFL	Eastern	Capitol	2nd	7	7	0	—	—	Allie Sherman
1969	1969	NFL	Eastern	Century	2nd	6	8	0	—	—	Alex Webster
1970	1970	NFL	NFC	East	2nd	9	5	0	—	Alex Webster (NFL COY)	Alex Webster
1971	1971	NFL	NFC	East	5th	4	10	0	—	—	Alex Webster
1972	1972	NFL	NFC	East	3rd	8	6	0	—	—	Alex Webster
1973	1973	NFL	NFC	East	5th	2	11	1	—	—	Alex Webster
1974	1974	NFL	NFC	East	5th	2	12	0	—	John Hicks (UPI NFC ROY)	Bill Arnsparger
1975	1975	NFL	NFC	East	4th	5	9	0	—	—	Bill Arnsparger
1976	1976	NFL	NFC	East	5th	3	11	0	—	—	Bill Arnsparger (0–7) John McVay (3–4)
1977	1977	NFL	NFC	East	5th	5	9	0	—	—	John McVay
1978^{[E]}	1978	NFL	NFC	East	5th	6	10	0	—	—	John McVay
1979	1979	NFL	NFC	East	4th	6	10	0	—	—	Ray Perkins
1980	1980	NFL	NFC	East	5th	4	12	0	—	—	Ray Perkins
1981	1981	NFL	NFC	East	3rd #	9	7	0	Won Wild Card playoffs (at Eagles) 27–21; Lost Divisional playoffs (at 49ers) 24–38	Lawrence Taylor (NFL DPOY/NFL DROY)	Ray Perkins
1982^{[F]}	1982	NFL	NFC	—	10th	4	5	0	—	Lawrence Taylor (NFL DPOY)	Ray Perkins
1983	1983	NFL	NFC	East	5th	3	12	1	—	Lawrence Taylor (NFC POY)	Bill Parcells
1984	1984	NFL	NFC	East	2nd #	9	7	0	Won Wild Card playoffs (at Rams) 16–13; Lost Divisional playoffs (at 49ers) 10–21		Bill Parcells
1985	1985	NFL	NFC	East	2nd^{[G]} #	10	6	0	Won Wild Card playoffs (49ers) 17–3; Lost Divisional playoffs (at Bears) 0–21	Phil Simms (Pro Bowl MVP)	Bill Parcells
1986	1986	NFL ‡	NFC *	East +	1st +	14	2	0	Won Divisional playoffs (49ers) 49–3; Won NFC Championship (Redskins) 17–0; Won Super Bowl XXI (5) (vs. Broncos) 39–20 ‡	Lawrence Taylor (NFL MVP/NFC POY/NFL DPOY/BBA); Bill Parcells (NFL COY); Phil Simms (Super Bowl XXI MVP)	Bill Parcells
1987^{[H]}	1987	NFL	NFC	East	5th	6	9	0	—	—	Bill Parcells
1988	1988	NFL	NFC	East	2nd^{[I]}	10	6	0	—	—	Bill Parcells
1989	1989	NFL	NFC	East +	1st +	12	4	0	Lost Divisional playoffs (Rams) 13–19 (OT)	Ottis Anderson (NFL CPOY)	Bill Parcells
1990	1990	NFL ‡	NFC *	East +	1st +	13	3	0	Won Divisional playoffs (Bears) 31–3; Won NFC Championship (at 49ers) 15–13; Won Super Bowl XXV (6) (vs. Bills) 20–19 ‡	Ottis Anderson (Super Bowl XXV MVP)	Bill Parcells
1991	1991	NFL	NFC	East	4th	8	8	0	—	—	Ray Handley
1992	1992	NFL	NFC	East	4th	6	10	0	—	—	Ray Handley
1993	1993	NFL	NFC	East	2nd #	11	5	0	Won Wild Card playoffs (Vikings) 17–10; Lost Divisional playoffs (at 49ers) 3–44	Dan Reeves (NFL COY); George Young (EOY)	Dan Reeves
1994	1994	NFL	NFC	East	2nd	9	7	0	—	—	Dan Reeves
1995	1995	NFL	NFC	East	4th	5	11	0	—	—	Dan Reeves
1996	1996	NFL	NFC	East	5th	6	10	0	—	—	Dan Reeves
1997	1997	NFL	NFC	East +	1st +	10	5	1	Lost Wild Card playoffs (Vikings) 22–23	Jim Fassel (NFL COY); George Young (EOY)	Jim Fassel
1998	1998	NFL	NFC	East	3rd	8	8	0	—	—	Jim Fassel
1999	1999	NFL	NFC	East	3rd	7	9	0	—	—	Jim Fassel
2000	2000	NFL	NFC *	East +	1st +	12	4	0	Won Divisional playoffs (Eagles) 20–10; Won NFC Championship (Vikings) 41–0; Lost Super Bowl XXXV (vs. Ravens) 7–34 *	—	Jim Fassel
2001	2001	NFL	NFC	East	3rd	7	9	0	—	Michael Strahan (NFL DPOY)	Jim Fassel
2002	2002	NFL	NFC	East	2nd #	10	6	0	Lost Wild Card playoffs (at 49ers) 38–39	—	Jim Fassel
2003	2003	NFL	NFC	East	4th	4	12	0	—	—	Jim Fassel
2004	2004	NFL	NFC	East	2nd	6	10	0	—	—	Tom Coughlin
2005	2005	NFL	NFC	East +	1st +	11	5	0	Lost Wild Card playoffs (Panthers) 0–23	—	Tom Coughlin
2006	2006	NFL	NFC	East	3rd #	8	8	0	Lost Wild Card playoffs (at Eagles) 20–23	—	Tom Coughlin
2007	2007	NFL ‡	NFC *	East	2nd #	10	6	0	Won Wild Card playoffs (at Buccaneers) 24–14; Won Divisional playoffs (at Cowboys) 21–17; Won NFC Championship (at Packers) 23–20 (OT); Won Super Bowl XLII (7) (vs. Patriots) 17–14 ‡	Eli Manning (Super Bowl XLII MVP)	Tom Coughlin
2008	2008	NFL	NFC	East +	1st +	12	4	0	Lost Divisional playoffs (Eagles) 11–23	—	Tom Coughlin
2009	2009	NFL	NFC	East	3rd	8	8	0	—	—	Tom Coughlin
2010	2010	NFL	NFC	East	2nd	10	6	0	—	—	Tom Coughlin
2011	2011	NFL ‡	NFC *	East +	1st +	9	7	0	Won Wild Card playoffs (Falcons) 24–2; Won Divisional playoffs (at Packers) 37–20; Won NFC Championship (at 49ers) 20–17 (OT); Won Super Bowl XLVI (8) (vs. Patriots) 21–17 ‡	Eli Manning (Super Bowl XLVI MVP)	Tom Coughlin
2012	2012	NFL	NFC	East	2nd	9	7	0	—	—	Tom Coughlin
2013	2013	NFL	NFC	East	3rd	7	9	0	—	—	Tom Coughlin
2014	2014	NFL	NFC	East	3rd	6	10	0	—	Odell Beckham Jr. (NFL OROY)	Tom Coughlin
2015	2015	NFL	NFC	East	3rd	6	10	0	—	—	Tom Coughlin
2016	2016	NFL	NFC	East	2nd #	11	5	0	Lost Wild Card playoffs (at Packers) 13–38	Eli Manning (Co-NFL WPMOY)	Ben McAdoo
2017	2017	NFL	NFC	East	4th	3	13	0	—	—	Ben McAdoo (2–10) Steve Spagnuolo (1–3)
2018	2018	NFL	NFC	East	4th	5	11	0	—	Saquon Barkley (NFL OROY)	Pat Shurmur
2019	2019	NFL	NFC	East	3rd	4	12	0	—	—	Pat Shurmur
2020	2020	NFL	NFC	East	2nd	6	10	0	—	—	Joe Judge
2021	2021	NFL	NFC	East	4th	4	13	0	—	—	Joe Judge
2022	2022	NFL	NFC	East	3rd #	9	7	1	Won Wild Card playoffs (at Vikings) 31–24; Lost Divisional playoffs (at Eagles) 7–38	Brian Daboll (NFL COY)	Brian Daboll
2023	2023	NFL	NFC	East	3rd	6	11	0	—	—	Brian Daboll
2024	2024	NFL	NFC	East	4th	3	14	0	—	—	Brian Daboll
2025	2025	NFL	NFC	East	4th	4	13	0	—	—	Brian Daboll (2–8) Mike Kafka (2–5)

Statistics above are current as of January 4, 2026. An em dash (—) indicates that the category is not applicable.

=== All-time records ===
New York Giants all-time win–loss records
Statistic	Wins	Losses	Ties	Win %
New York Giants regular season record	728	676	34	.518
New York Giants postseason record	25	26	—	.490
All-time regular and postseason record	753	702	34	.517

== Notes ==
- ^{A} The NFL did not hold playoff games until 1932. The team that finished with the best regular season record was awarded the league championship.
- ^{B} In 1933, the league split into East and West divisions.
- ^{C} In 1950, the league switched to American and National conferences.
- ^{D} This was the first championship game in NFL history where an overtime period was played, and has been nicknamed "The Greatest Game Ever Played".
- ^{E} In 1978, the NFL expanded its regular season schedule, which had been 14 games since 1961, to 16 games.
- ^{F} Due to the 1982 NFL strike, the league was split into two conferences, instead of its usual divisional alignment. The season was shortened to nine games, and the top eight teams in each conference earned berths in an expanded 16-team playoff tournament.
- ^{G} The Giants, Dallas Cowboys, and Washington Redskins finished the 1985 season with identical 10–6 records. Dallas was awarded the NFC East title because they had the best head-to-head record among the three teams. The Giants were awarded a wild card berth because of their record in NFC play, while Washington did not qualify for the playoffs due to a head-to-head loss against the San Francisco 49ers, who also finished 10–6.
- ^{H} The 1987 NFL strike caused the schedule to be reduced to 15 games.
- ^{I} The Giants, Philadelphia Eagles, Los Angeles Rams (NFC West), and New Orleans Saints (NFC West) finished the 1988 season with identical 10–6 records. Philadelphia was awarded the NFC East title due to a head-to-head sweep of the Giants in regular season play, while Los Angeles was awarded a wild card berth based on winning percentage in NFC play. The Giants and Saints did not qualify for the playoffs.
