= List of NFL annual passing yards leaders =

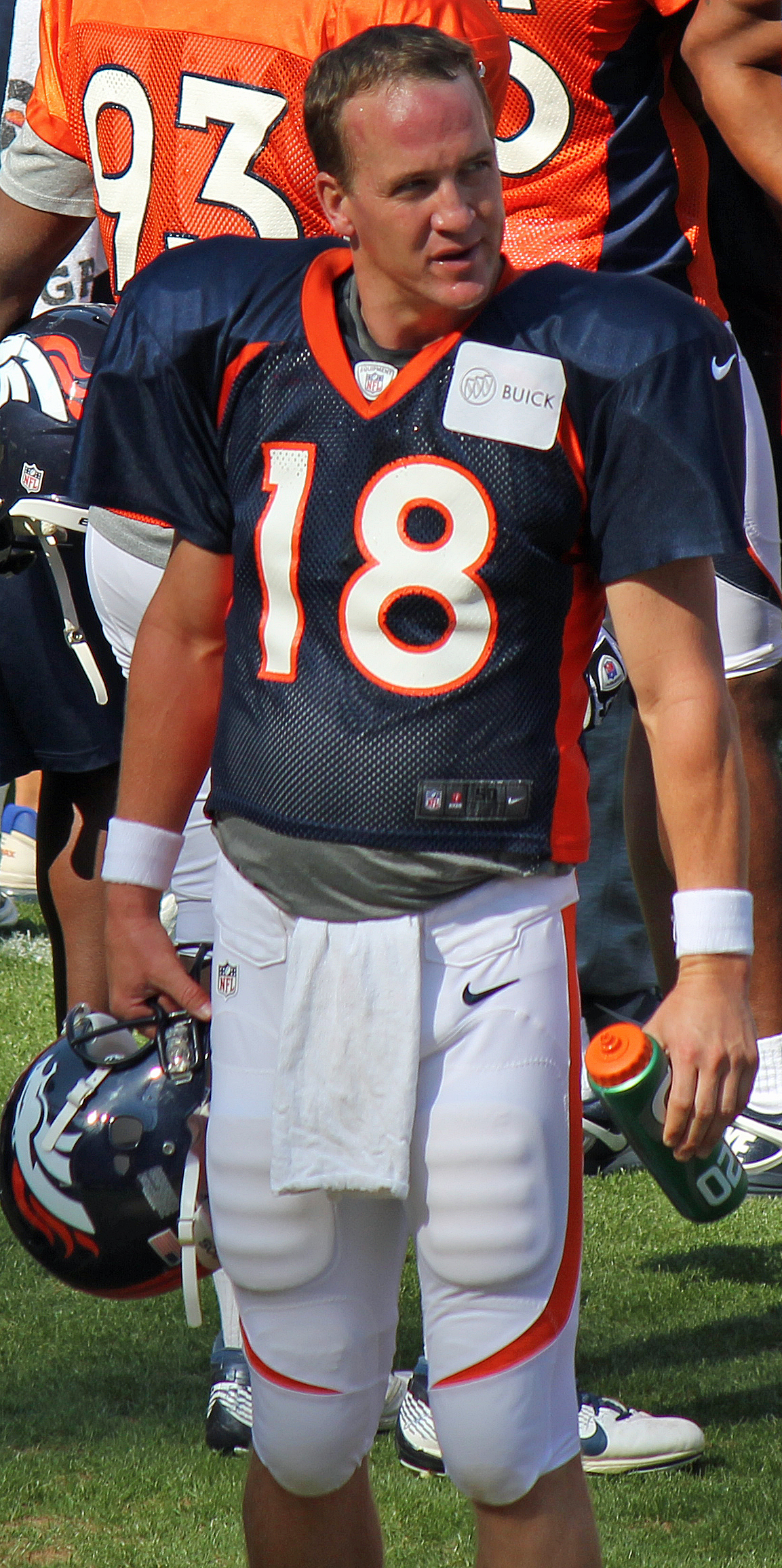
Peyton Manning holds the single-season passing yards record, passing for 5,477 yards in 2013.

In American football, passing, along with running (also referred to as rushing), is one of the two main methods of advancing the ball down the field. Passes are typically attempted by the quarterback, but any offensive player can attempt a pass provided they are behind the line of scrimmage. To qualify as a passing play, the ball must have initially moved forward after leaving the hands of the passer; if the ball initially moved laterally or backwards, the play would instead be considered a running play. A player who catches a forward pass is a receiver. Passing yards are measured in flat yards along one direction of the field, always starting from the line of scrimmage and ending at the point that the receiver is ruled down. If the receiver reaches the end zone and scores a touchdown, then the yardage measurement ends at the opposing team's goal line (the zero-yard line). Passing yards do not include incomplete throws.

The National Football League (NFL) did not begin keeping official records until the 1932 season. In addition to the overall NFL passing yards leaders, league record books recognize the passing yards leaders of the American Football League (AFL), which operated from 1960 to 1969 before being absorbed into the NFL in 1970. The NFL also recognizes the statistics of the All-America Football Conference, which operated from 1946 to 1949 before three of its teams were merged into the NFL, since 2025.

The record for passing yards in a season is held by Peyton Manning of the Denver Broncos who passed for 5,477 yards in 2013. Drew Brees has led the NFL in passing yards in seven seasons, more than any other quarterback in NFL history. Brees has also passed for over 5,000 yards in a season five times, whereas no other player has done so more than twice. Patrick Mahomes led the league in passing yards in 2022 and became the first player in the Super Bowl era to do so and win a league championship in the same season.

== NFL annual passing yards leaders ==
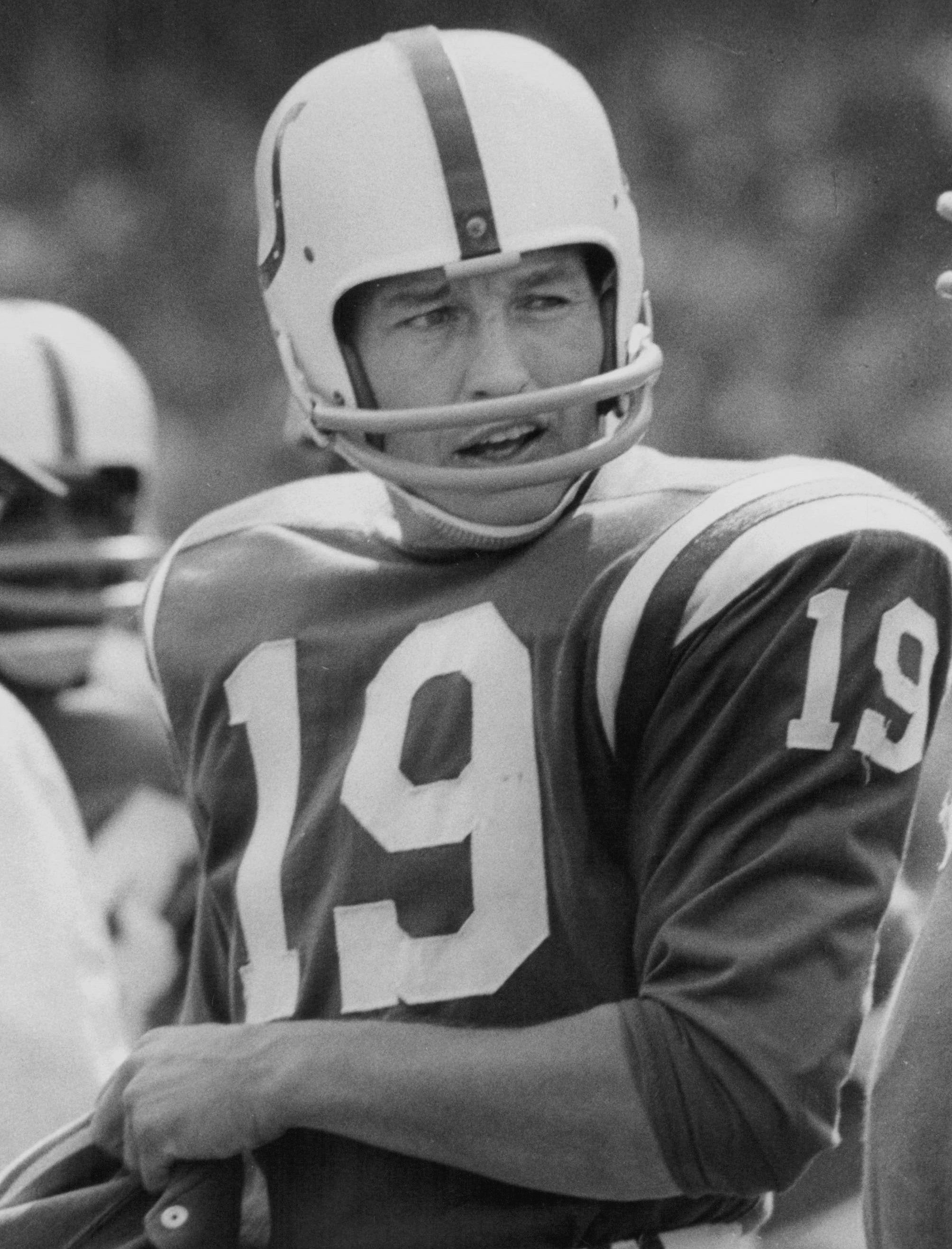
Johnny Unitas, who led the league in passing four times, passed for 3,099 yards in 1960. This marked the first time that a player passed for over 3,000 in a season.

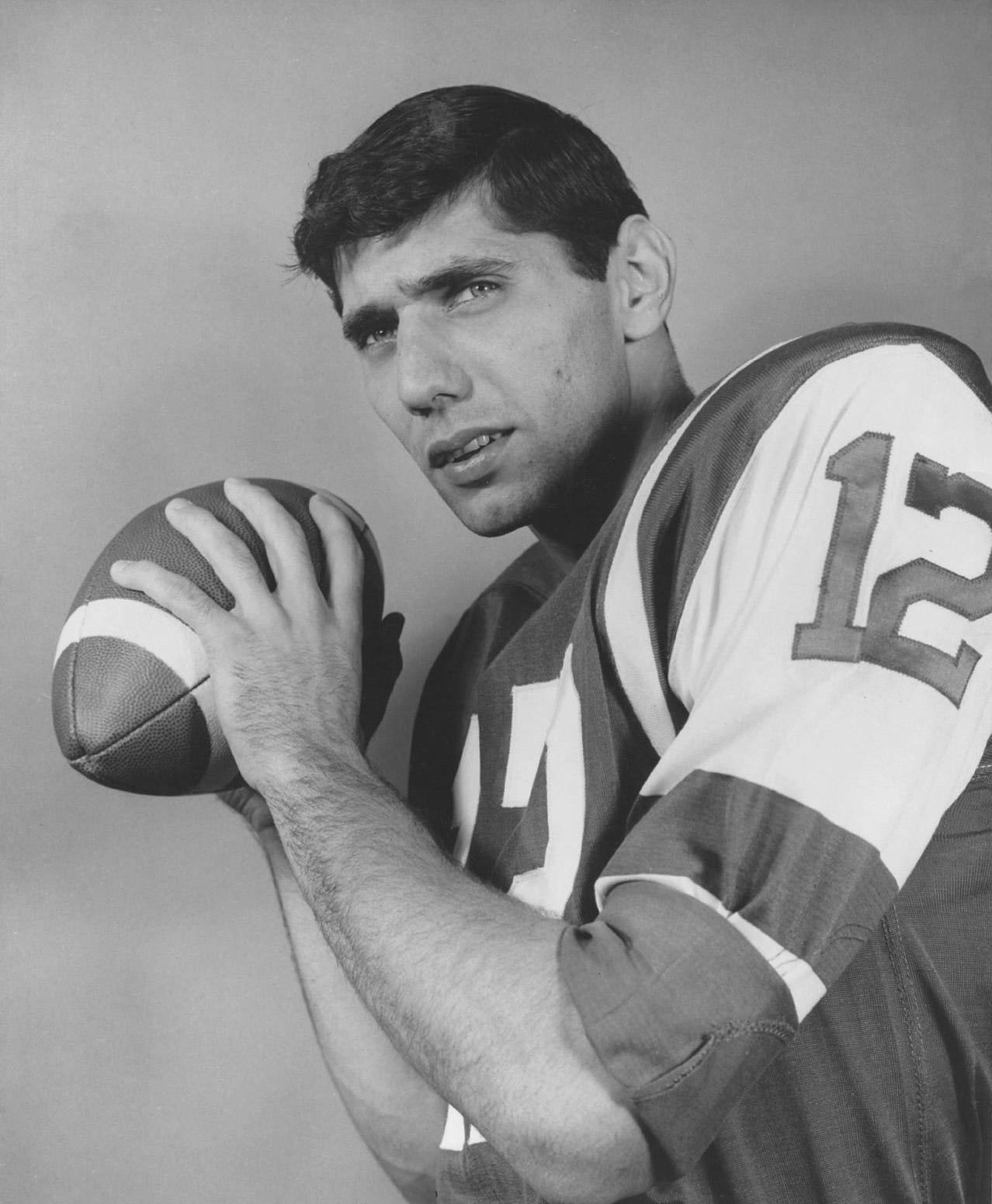
Joe Namath was the first player to pass for over 4,000 yards in a season, doing so in the 1967 AFL season.

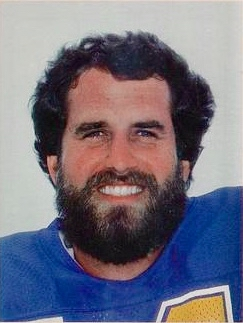
Dan Fouts led the league in four consecutive seasons (1979–1982).

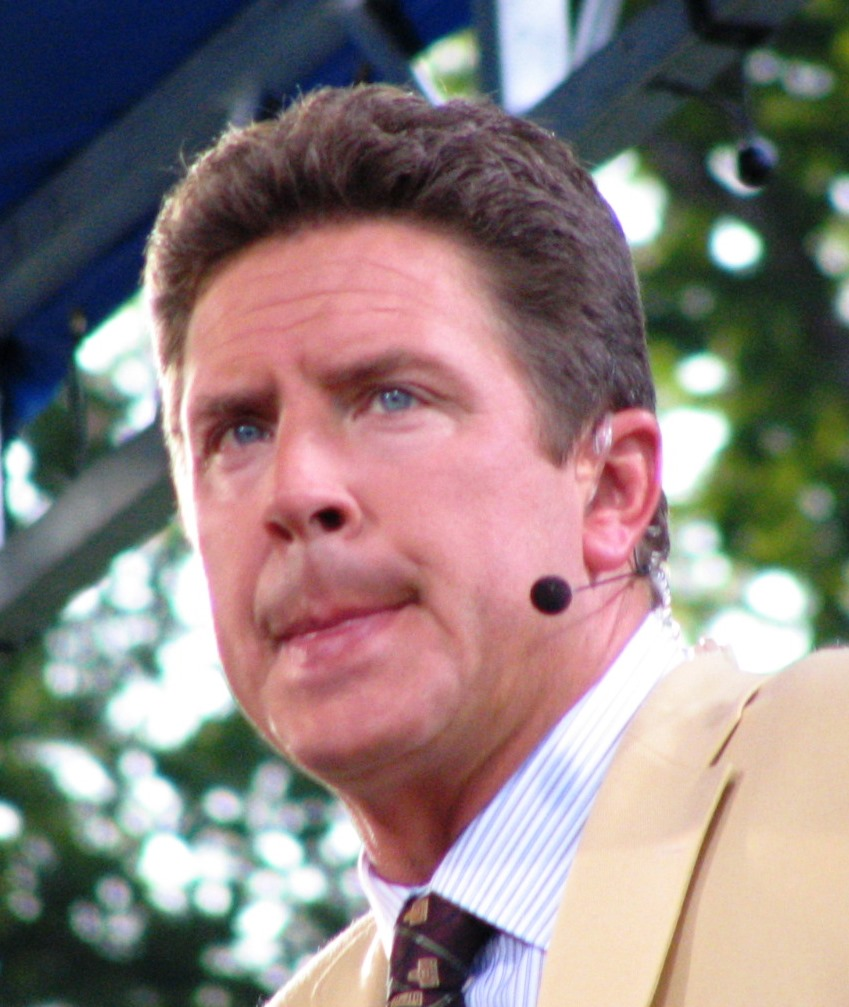
In 1984, Dan Marino passed for 5,084 yards, setting the single-season passing yards record. He was the first player to pass for over 5,000 yards in a season and led the league in passing five times.

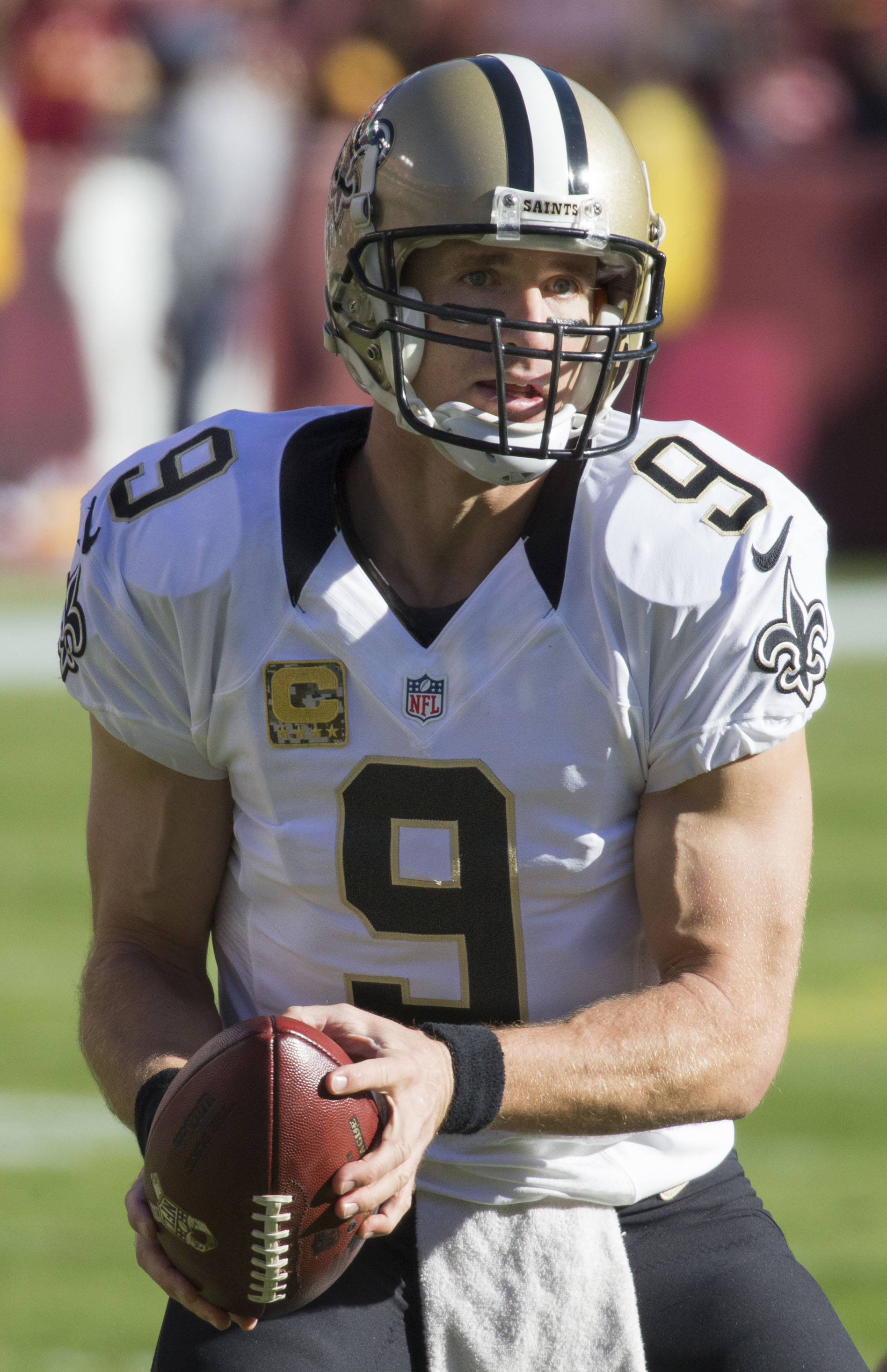
Drew Brees led the league in passing yards in 2006, the first of his record seven times.

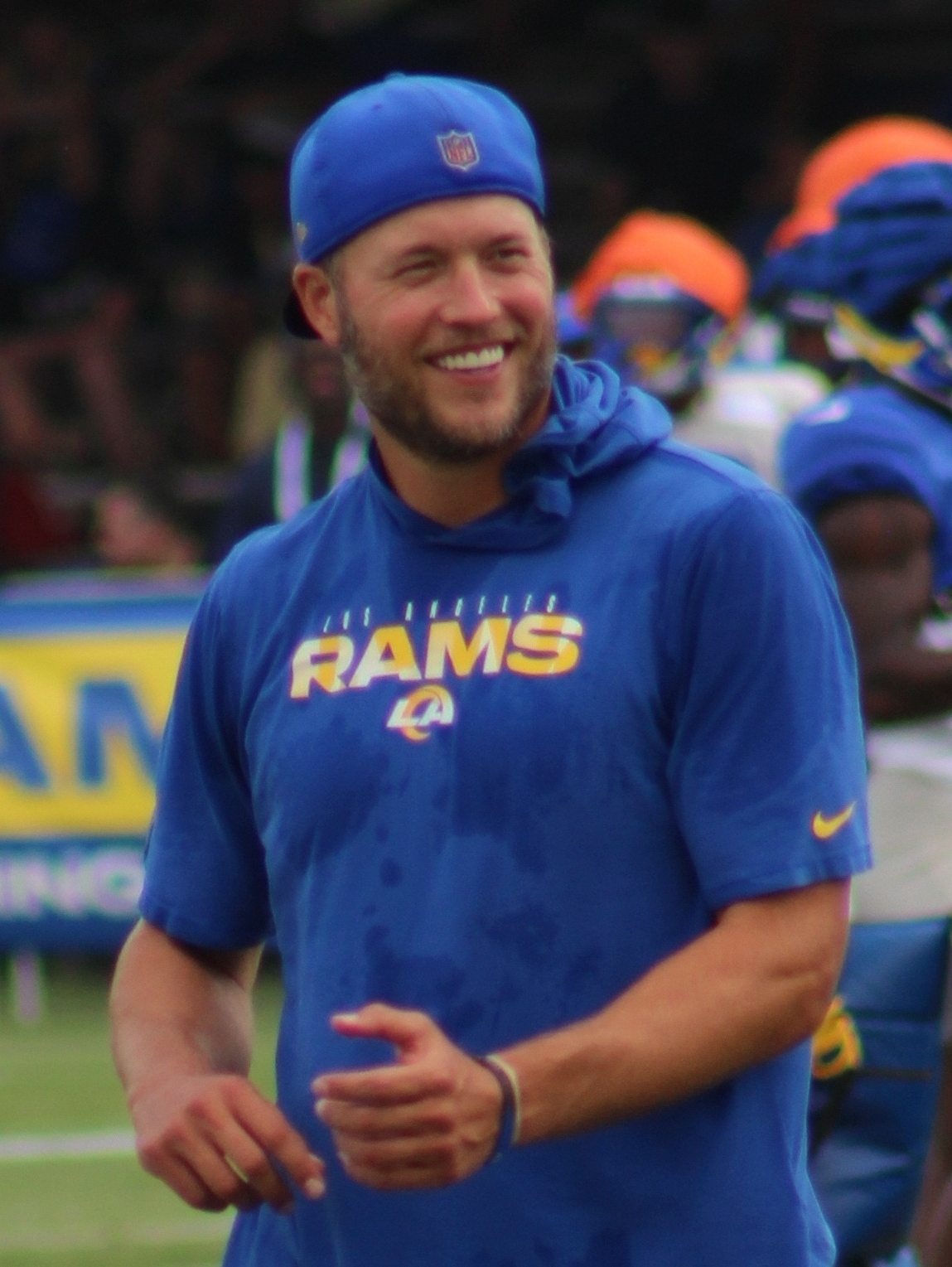
Matthew Stafford is the most recent passing yards leader, having led the league with 4,707 passing yards in the 2025 season.

Key
Symbol	Meaning
Leader	The player who recorded the most passing yards in the NFL
Yds	The total number of passing yards the player had
GP	The number of games played by a player during the season (Note: The NFL did not have a set number of games for teams to play until the 1935 season, instead setting a minimum.)
†	Inducted into the Pro Football Hall of Fame
^	Active player
*	Set the single-season passing yards record
(#)	Denotes the number of times a player appears in this list

NFL annual passing yards leaders by season
Season	Leader	Yds	GP	Team	Refs
1932	Arnie Herber†	639*	14	Green Bay Packers	
1933	Harry Newman	973*	14	New York Giants	
1934	Arnie Herber† (2)	799	11	Green Bay Packers	
1935	Ed Danowski	794	12	New York Giants	
1936	Arnie Herber† (3)	1,239*	12	Green Bay Packers	
1937	Sammy Baugh†	1,127	11	Washington Redskins	
1938	Ace Parker†	865	11	Brooklyn Dodgers	
1939	Davey O'Brien	1,324*	11	Philadelphia Eagles	
1940	Sammy Baugh† (2)	1,367*	11	Washington Redskins	
1941	Cecil Isbell	1,479*	11	Green Bay Packers	
1942	Cecil Isbell (2)	2,021*	11	Green Bay Packers	
1943	Sid Luckman†	2,194*	10	Chicago Bears	
1944	Irv Comp	1,159	10	Green Bay Packers	
1945	Sid Luckman† (2)	1,727	10	Chicago Bears	
1946	Sid Luckman† (3)	1,826	11	Chicago Bears	
1947	Sammy Baugh† (3)	2,938*	12	Washington Redskins	
1948	Sammy Baugh† (4)	2,599	12	Washington Redskins	
1949	Johnny Lujack	2,658	12	Chicago Bears	
1950	Bobby Layne†	2,323	12	Detroit Lions	
1951	Bobby Layne† (2)	2,403	12	Detroit Lions	
1952	Otto Graham†	2,816	12	Cleveland Browns	
1953	Otto Graham† (2)	2,722	12	Cleveland Browns	
1954	Norm Van Brocklin†	2,637	12	Los Angeles Rams	
1955	Jim Finks†	2,270	12	Pittsburgh Steelers	
1956	Tobin Rote	2,203	12	Green Bay Packers	
1957	Johnny Unitas†	2,550	12	Baltimore Colts	
1958	Bill Wade	2,875	12	Los Angeles Rams	
1959	Johnny Unitas† (2)	2,899	12	Baltimore Colts	
1960	Johnny Unitas† (3)	3,099*	12	Baltimore Colts	
1961	Sonny Jurgensen†	3,723*	14	Philadelphia Eagles	
1962	Sonny Jurgensen† (2)	3,261	14	Philadelphia Eagles	
1963	Johnny Unitas† (4)	3,481	14	Baltimore Colts	
1964	Charley Johnson	3,045	14	St. Louis Cardinals	
1965	John Brodie	3,112	13	San Francisco 49ers	
1966	Sonny Jurgensen† (3)	3,209	14	Washington Redskins	
1967	Sonny Jurgensen† (4)	3,747*	14	Washington Redskins	
1968	John Brodie (2)	3,020	14	San Francisco 49ers	
1969	Sonny Jurgensen† (5)	3,102	14	Washington Redskins	
1970	John Brodie (3)	2,941	14	San Francisco 49ers	
1971	John Hadl	3,075	14	San Diego Chargers	
1972	Joe Namath†	2,816	13	New York Jets	
1973	Roman Gabriel	3,219	14	Philadelphia Eagles	
1974	Ken Anderson	2,667	13	Cincinnati Bengals	
1975	Ken Anderson (2)	3,169	13	Cincinnati Bengals	
1976	Bert Jones	3,104	14	Baltimore Colts	
1977	Joe Ferguson	2,803	14	Buffalo Bills	
1978	Fran Tarkenton†	3,468	16	Minnesota Vikings	
1979	Dan Fouts†	4,082*	16	San Diego Chargers	
1980	Dan Fouts† (2)	4,715*	16	San Diego Chargers	
1981	Dan Fouts† (3)	4,802*	16	San Diego Chargers	
1982	Dan Fouts† (4)	2,883	9	San Diego Chargers	
1983	Lynn Dickey	4,458	16	Green Bay Packers	
1984	Dan Marino†	5,084*	16	Miami Dolphins	
1985	Dan Marino† (2)	4,137	16	Miami Dolphins	
1986	Dan Marino† (3)	4,746	16	Miami Dolphins	
1987	Neil Lomax	3,387	12	St. Louis Cardinals	
1988	Dan Marino† (4)	4,434	16	Miami Dolphins	
1989	Don Majkowski	4,318	16	Green Bay Packers	
1990	Warren Moon†	4,689	15	Houston Oilers	
1991	Warren Moon† (2)	4,690	16	Houston Oilers	
1992	Dan Marino† (5)	4,116	16	Miami Dolphins	
1993	John Elway†	4,030	16	Denver Broncos	
1994	Drew Bledsoe	4,555	16	New England Patriots	
1995	Brett Favre†	4,413	16	Green Bay Packers	
1996	Mark Brunell	4,367	16	Jacksonville Jaguars	
1997	Jeff George	3,917	16	Oakland Raiders	
1998	Brett Favre† (2)	4,212	16	Green Bay Packers	
1999	Steve Beuerlein	4,436	16	Carolina Panthers	
2000	Peyton Manning†	4,413	16	Indianapolis Colts	
2001	Kurt Warner†	4,830	16	St. Louis Rams	
2002	Rich Gannon	4,689	16	Oakland Raiders	
2003	Peyton Manning† (2)	4,267	16	Indianapolis Colts	
2004	Daunte Culpepper	4,717	16	Minnesota Vikings	
2005	Tom Brady	4,110	16	New England Patriots	
2006	Drew Brees†	4,418	16	New Orleans Saints	
2007	Tom Brady (2)	4,806	16	New England Patriots	
2008	Drew Brees† (2)	5,069	16	New Orleans Saints	
2009	Matt Schaub	4,770	16	Houston Texans	
2010	Philip Rivers	4,710	16	San Diego Chargers	
2011	Drew Brees† (3)	5,476*	16	New Orleans Saints	
2012	Drew Brees† (4)	5,177	16	New Orleans Saints	
2013	Peyton Manning† (3)	5,477*	16	Denver Broncos	
2014	Drew Brees† (5)	4,952	16	New Orleans Saints	
2014	Ben Roethlisberger	4,952	16	Pittsburgh Steelers	
2015	Drew Brees† (6)	4,870	15	New Orleans Saints	
2016	Drew Brees† (7)	5,208	16	New Orleans Saints	
2017	Tom Brady (3)	4,577	16	New England Patriots	
2018	Ben Roethlisberger (2)	5,129	16	Pittsburgh Steelers	
2019	Jameis Winston^	5,109	16	Tampa Bay Buccaneers	
2020	Deshaun Watson^	4,823	16	Houston Texans	
2021	Tom Brady (4)	5,316	17	Tampa Bay Buccaneers	
2022	Patrick Mahomes^	5,250	17	Kansas City Chiefs	
2023	Tua Tagovailoa^	4,624	17	Miami Dolphins	
2024	Joe Burrow^	4,918	17	Cincinnati Bengals	
2025	Matthew Stafford^	4,707	17	Los Angeles Rams	

== AFL annual passing yards leaders ==
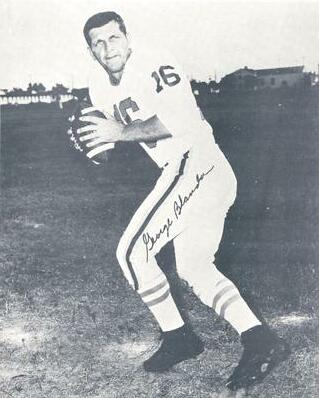
George Blanda, thought to be washed up in the NFL at 33, revived his career in the AFL, where he led the league in passing yards in two of the league's first three seasons (1961, 1963) while winning the AFL MVP in 1961.

Key
Symbol	Meaning
Leader	The player who recorded the most passing yards in the AFL
Yds	The total number of passing yards the player had
GP	The number of games played by a player during the season
†	Pro Football Hall of Fame member
*	Player set the single-season passing yards record
(#)	Denotes the number of times a player appears in this list

AFL annual passing yards leaders by season
Season	Leader	Yds	GP	Team	Refs
1960	Frank Tripucka	3,038*	14	Denver Broncos	
1961	George Blanda†	3,330*	14	Houston Oilers	
1962	Frank Tripucka (2)	2,917	14	Denver Broncos	
1963	George Blanda† (2)	3,003	14	Houston Oilers	
1964	Babe Parilli	3,465*	14	Boston Patriots	
1965	John Hadl	2,798	14	San Diego Chargers	
1966	Joe Namath†	3,379	14	New York Jets	
1967	Joe Namath† (2)	4,007*	14	New York Jets	
1968	John Hadl (2)	3,473	14	San Diego Chargers	
1969	Daryle Lamonica	3,302	14	Oakland Raiders	

== AAFC annual passing yards leaders ==
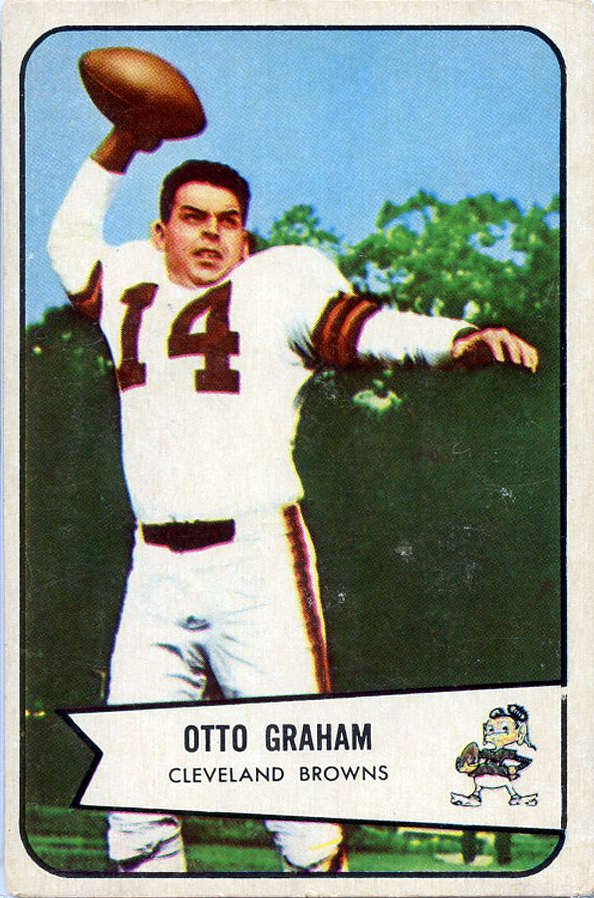
Otto Graham led in passing yards in three of the four seasons held by the AAFC. In 1952, he led the NFL in passing yards to become the first of only two people to lead in passing yards for two different professional football leagues.

Key
Symbol	Meaning
Leader	The player who recorded the most passing yards in the AAFC
Yds	The total number of passing yards the player had
GP	The number of games played by a player during the season
†	Pro Football Hall of Fame member
*	Player set the single-season passing yards record
(#)	Denotes the number of times a player appears in this list

AAFC annual passing yards leaders by season
Season	Leader	TDs	GP	Team	Refs
1946	Glenn Dobbs	1,886*	12	Brooklyn Dodgers	
1947	Otto Graham†	2,753*	14	Cleveland Browns	
1948	Otto Graham† (2)	2,713	14	Cleveland Browns	
1949	Otto Graham† (3)	2,785*	12	Cleveland Browns	

== Most seasons leading the league ==
Count	Player	Seasons	Team(s)	Refs
7	Drew Brees	2006, 2008, 2011, 2012, 2014–2016	New Orleans Saints	
5	Otto Graham	1947, 1948, 1949, 1952, 1953 (Note: AAFC statistics for Graham's 1947-1949 seasons were not recognized by the NFL until 2025.)	Cleveland Browns	
5	Sonny Jurgensen	1961, 1962, 1966, 1967, 1969	Philadelphia Eagles (2), Washington Redskins (3)	
5	Dan Marino	1984–1986, 1988, 1992	Miami Dolphins	
4	Sammy Baugh	1937, 1940, 1947, 1948	Washington Redskins	
4	Tom Brady	2005, 2007, 2017, 2021	New England Patriots (3), Tampa Bay Buccaneers (1)	
4	Dan Fouts	1979–1982	San Diego Chargers	
4	Johnny Unitas	1957, 1959, 1960, 1963	Baltimore Colts	
3	John Brodie	1965, 1968, 1970	San Francisco 49ers	
3	John Hadl	1965, 1968, 1971	San Diego Chargers	
3	Arnie Herber	1932, 1934, 1936	Green Bay Packers	
3	Peyton Manning	2000, 2003, 2013	Indianapolis Colts (2), Denver Broncos (1)	
2	Ken Anderson	1974, 1975	Cincinnati Bengals	
2	George Blanda	1961, 1963	Houston Oilers	
2	Brett Favre	1995, 1998	Green Bay Packers	
2	Cecil Isbell	1941, 1942	Green Bay Packers	
2	Bobby Layne	1950, 1951	Detroit Lions	
2	Warren Moon	1990, 1991	Houston Oilers	
2	Joe Namath	1966, 1967	New York Jets	
2	Ben Roethlisberger	2014, 2018	Pittsburgh Steelers	
2	Frank Tripucka	1960, 1962	Denver Broncos	

== See also ==
- List of NFL annual passing touchdowns leaders
- List of NFL annual pass completion percentage leaders
- List of NFL annual passer rating leaders
- List of NFL career passing yards leaders
