= List of NFL annual passing touchdowns leaders =

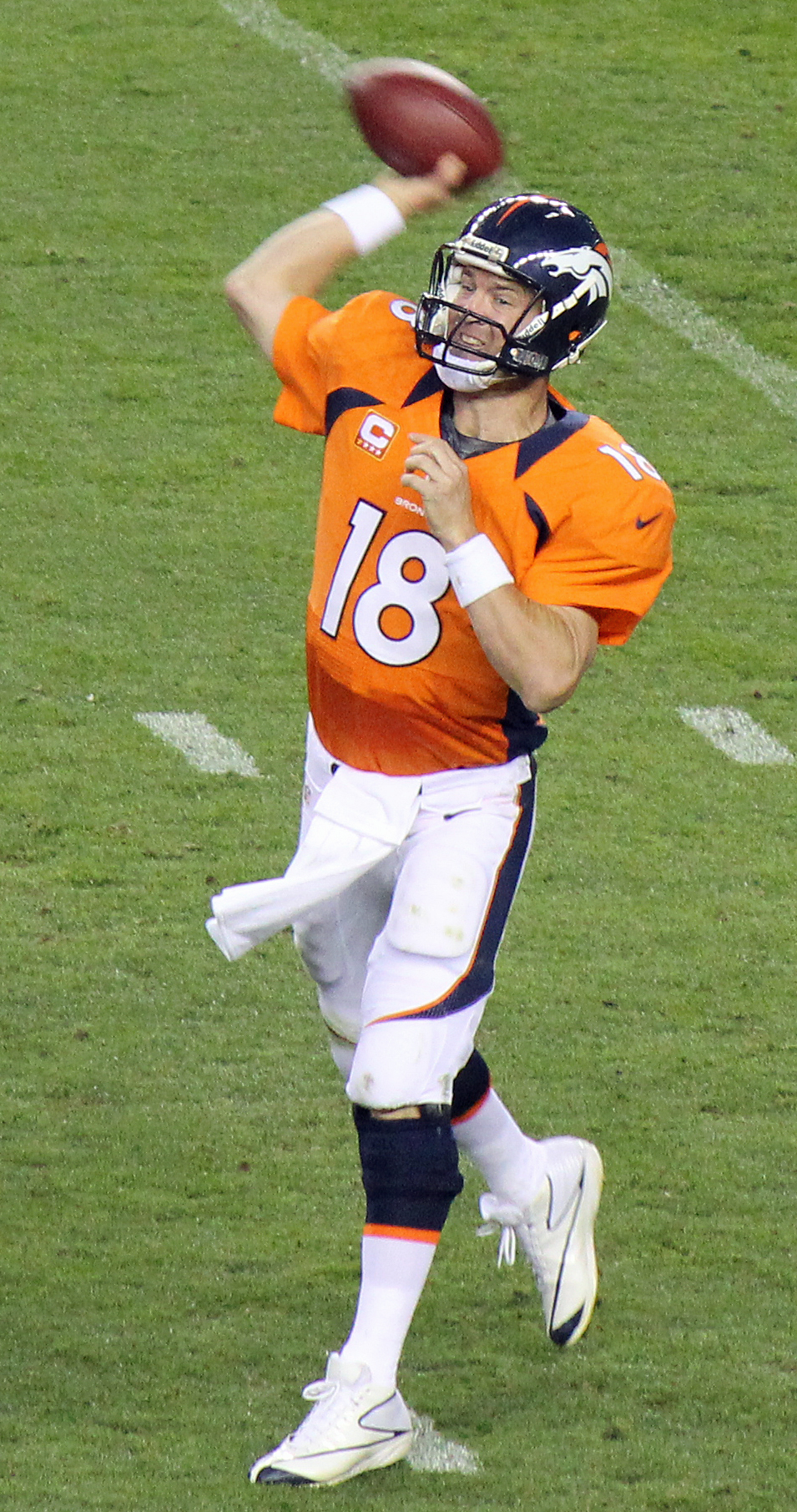
Peyton Manning holds the single-season passing touchdowns record, throwing 55 touchdowns in 2013.

In American football, passing, along with running (also referred to as rushing), is one of the two main methods of advancing the ball down the field. Passes are typically attempted by the quarterback, but any offensive player can attempt a pass provided they are behind the line of scrimmage. To qualify as a passing play, the ball must have initially moved forward after leaving the hands of the passer; if the ball initially moved laterally or backwards, the play would instead be considered a running play. A player who catches a forward pass is called a receiver. A touchdown pass is a pass thrown from a passer to a receiver that results in a touchdown being scored. To be counted as a touchdown pass, the ball can be caught within the field of play and advanced by the receiver into the end zone, or caught by a receiver within the boundaries of the end zone. The number of passing touchdowns a player makes is a recorded statistic in football games. In addition to the overall National Football League (NFL) passing touchdown leaders, league record books recognize the passing touchdown leaders of the American Football League (AFL), which operated from 1960 to 1969 before being absorbed into the NFL in 1970. The NFL also recognizes the statistics of the All-America Football Conference, which operated from 1946 to 1949 before three of its teams were merged into the NFL, since 2025. The NFL did not begin keeping official records until the 1932 season.

Tom Brady has led the NFL in passing touchdowns five times, more than any other quarterback. Johnny Unitas is the only player to lead the league four times consecutively, doing so from 1957 through 1960. The record for touchdown passes in a season is held by Peyton Manning, who had 55 passing touchdowns in the 2013 season while playing for the Denver Broncos. Only two other players have recorded 50 or more passing touchdowns in a season, Brady and Patrick Mahomes.

== NFL annual passing touchdowns leaders ==
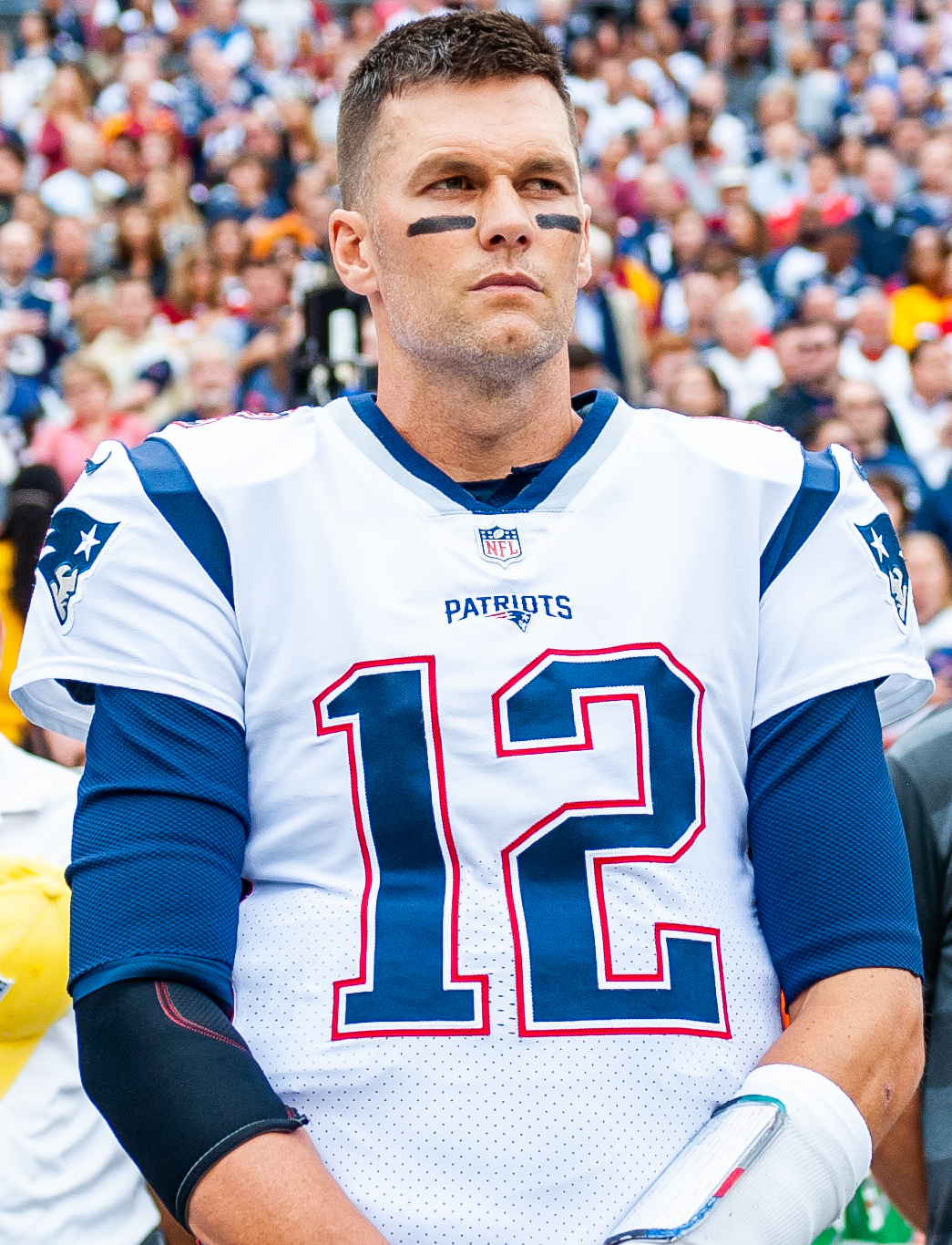
Tom Brady led the league in passing touchdowns five times, an NFL record.

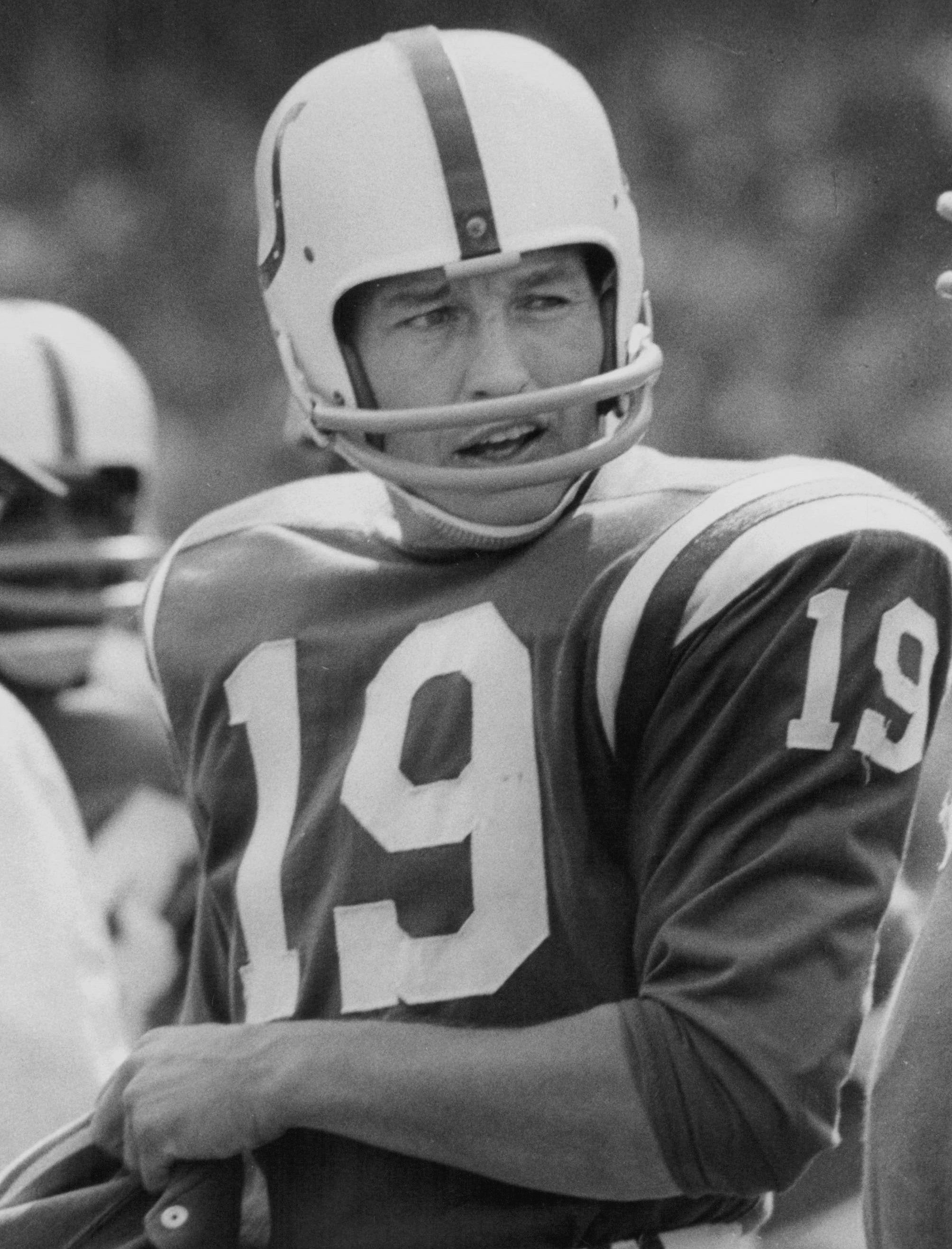
Johnny Unitas is the only player to have led the league in passing touchdowns in four consecutive seasons (1957–1960).

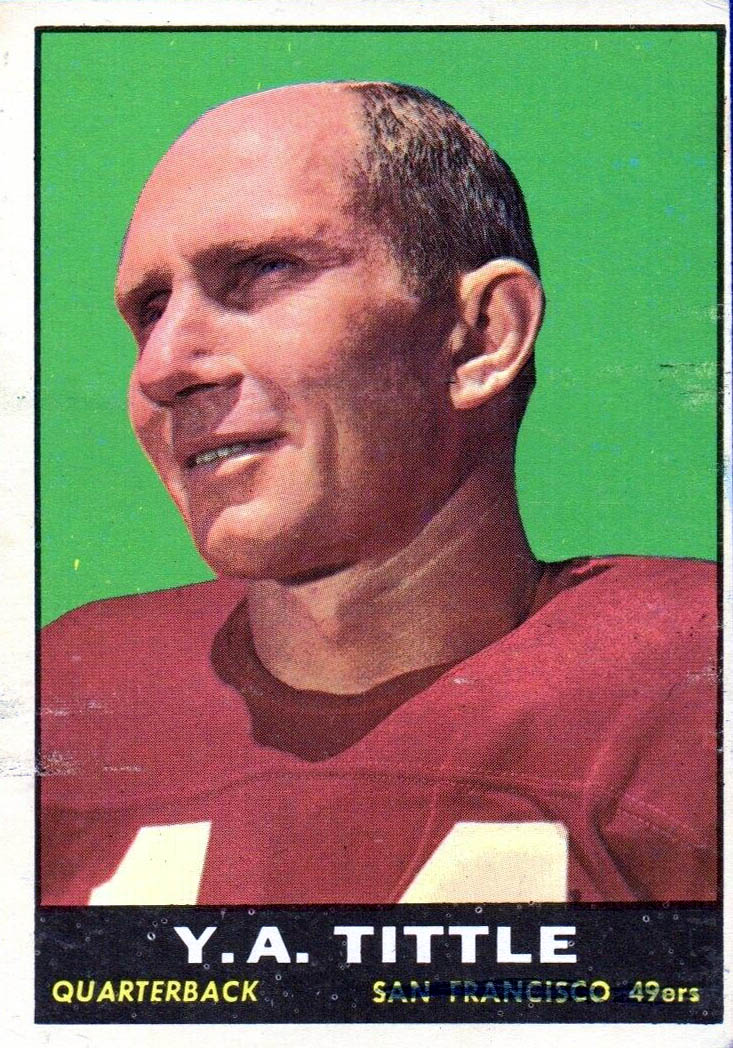
Y. A. Tittle held the record for most passing touchdowns in a season for 21 years and led the league in passing touchdowns three times.

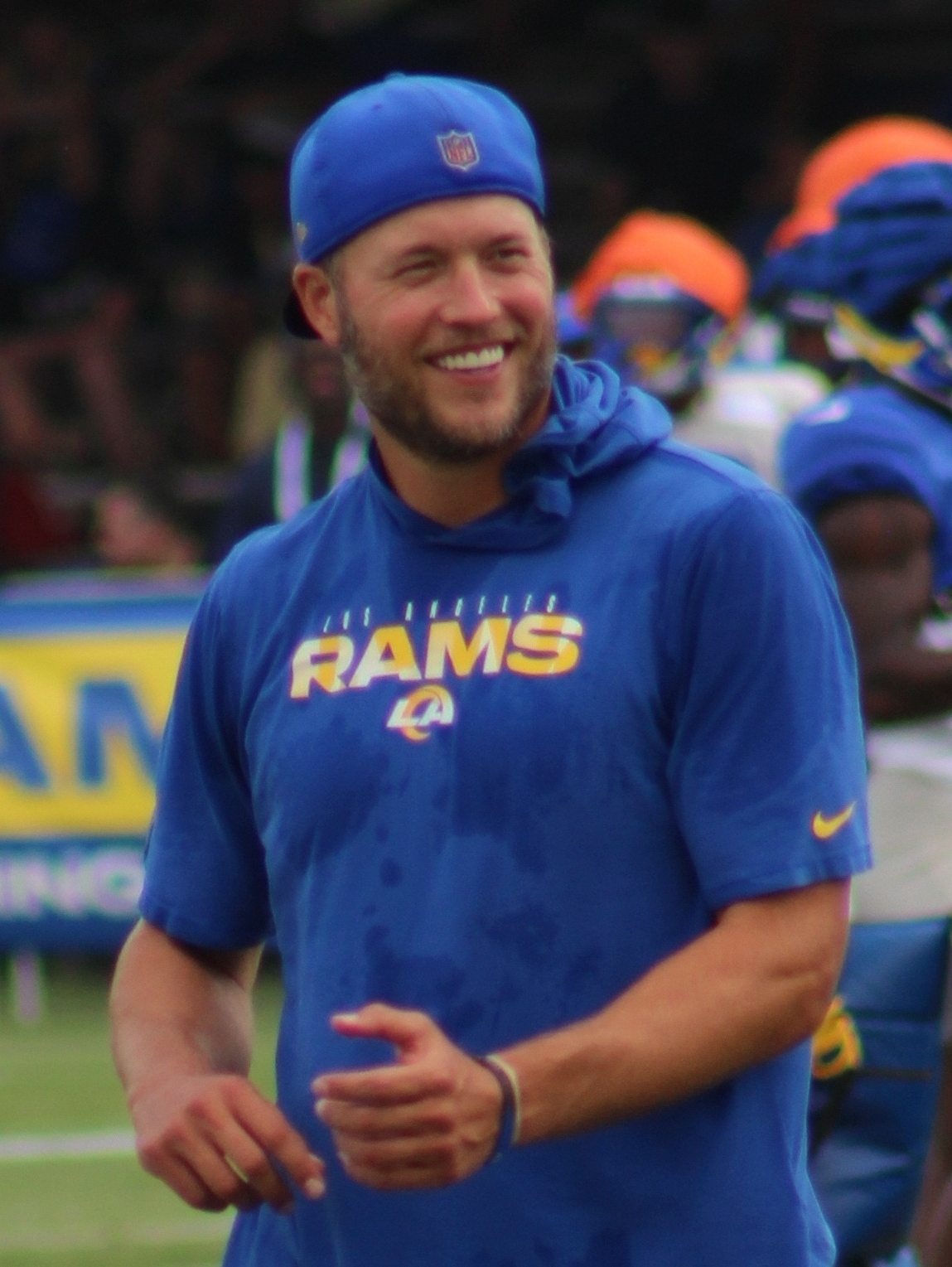
Matthew Stafford is the most recent passing touchdowns leader, having led the league with 46 passing touchdowns in the 2025 season.

Key
Symbol	Meaning
Leader	The player who recorded the most passing touchdowns in the NFL
TDs	The total number of passing touchdowns the player had
GP	The number of games played by a player during the season (Note: The NFL did not have a set number of games for teams to play until the 1935 season, instead setting a minimum.)
†	Inducted into the Pro Football Hall of Fame
^	Active player
*	Set the single-season passing touchdowns record
(#)	Denotes the number of times a player appears in this list

NFL annual passing touchdowns leaders by season
Season	Leader	TDs	GP	Team	Refs
1932	Arnie Herber†	9*	14	Green Bay Packers	
1933	Harry Newman	11*	14	New York Giants	
1934	Arnie Herber† (2)	8	11	Green Bay Packers	
1935	Ed Danowski	10	12	New York Giants	
1936	Arnie Herber† (3)	11	12	Green Bay Packers	
1937	Bernie Masterson	9	10	Chicago Bears	
1938	Bob Monnett	9	8	Green Bay Packers	
1939	Frank Filchock	11	11	Washington Redskins	
1940	Sammy Baugh†	12*	11	Washington Redskins	
1941	Cecil Isbell	15*	11	Green Bay Packers	
1942	Cecil Isbell (2)	24*	11	Green Bay Packers	
1943	Sid Luckman†	28*	10	Chicago Bears	
1944	Frank Filchock (2)	13	10	Washington Redskins	
1945	Sid Luckman† (2)	14	10	Chicago Bears	
1945	Bob Waterfield†	14	10	Cleveland Rams	
1946	Sid Luckman† (3)	17	11	Chicago Bears	
1946	Bob Waterfield† (2)	17	11	Los Angeles Rams	
1947	Sammy Baugh† (2)	25	12	Washington Redskins	
1948	Tommy Thompson	25	12	Philadelphia Eagles	
1949	Johnny Lujack	23	12	Chicago Bears	
1950	George Ratterman	22	12	New York Yanks	
1951	Bobby Layne†	26	12	Detroit Lions	
1952	Jim Finks†	20	12	Pittsburgh Steelers	
1952	Otto Graham†	20	12	Cleveland Browns	
1953	Bobby Thomason	21	12	Philadelphia Eagles	
1954	Adrian Burk	23	12	Philadelphia Eagles	
1955	Y. A Tittle†	17	12	San Francisco 49ers	
1955	Tobin Rote	17	12	Green Bay Packers	
1956	Tobin Rote (2)	18	12	Green Bay Packers	
1957	Johnny Unitas†	24	12	Baltimore Colts	
1958	Johnny Unitas† (2)	19	10	Baltimore Colts	
1959	Johnny Unitas† (3)	32*	12	Baltimore Colts	
1960	Johnny Unitas† (4)	25	12	Baltimore Colts	
1961	Sonny Jurgensen†	32	14	Philadelphia Eagles	
1962	Y. A Tittle† (2)	33*	14	New York Giants	
1963	Y. A Tittle† (3)	36*	13	New York Giants	
1964	Frank Ryan	25	14	Cleveland Browns	
1965	John Brodie	30	13	San Francisco 49ers	
1966	Frank Ryan (2)	29	14	Cleveland Browns	
1967	Sonny Jurgensen† (2)	31	14	Washington Redskins	
1968	Earl Morrall	26	14	Baltimore Colts	
1969	Roman Gabriel	24	14	Los Angeles Rams	
1970	John Brodie (2)	24	14	San Francisco 49ers	
1971	John Hadl	21	14	San Diego Chargers	
1972	Billy Kilmer	19	12	Washington Redskins	
1972	Joe Namath†	19	13	New York Jets	
1973	Roman Gabriel (2)	23	14	Philadelphia Eagles	
1973	Roger Staubach†	23	14	Dallas Cowboys	
1974	Ken Stabler†	26	14	Oakland Raiders	
1975	Fran Tarkenton†	25	14	Minnesota Vikings	
1975	Joe Ferguson	25	14	Buffalo Bills	
1976	Ken Stabler† (2)	27	12	Oakland Raiders	
1977	Bob Griese†	22	14	Miami Dolphins	
1978	Terry Bradshaw†	28	16	Pittsburgh Steelers	
1979	Steve Grogan	28	16	New England Patriots	
1979	Brian Sipe	28	16	Cleveland Browns	
1980	Steve Bartkowski	31	16	Atlanta Falcons	
1981	Dan Fouts†	33	16	San Diego Chargers	
1982	Dan Fouts† (2)	17	9	San Diego Chargers	
1982	Terry Bradshaw† (2)	17	9	Pittsburgh Steelers	
1982	Joe Montana†	17	9	San Francisco 49ers	
1983	Lynn Dickey	32	16	Green Bay Packers	
1984	Dan Marino†	48*	16	Miami Dolphins	
1985	Dan Marino† (2)	30	16	Miami Dolphins	
1986	Dan Marino† (3)	44	16	Miami Dolphins	
1987	Joe Montana† (2)	31	13	San Francisco 49ers	
1988	Jim Everett	31	16	Los Angeles Rams	
1989	Jim Everett (2)	29	16	Los Angeles Rams	
1990	Warren Moon†	33	15	Houston Oilers	
1991	Jim Kelly†	33	15	Buffalo Bills	
1992	Steve Young†	25	16	San Francisco 49ers	
1993	Steve Young† (2)	29	16	San Francisco 49ers	
1994	Steve Young† (3)	35	16	San Francisco 49ers	
1995	Brett Favre†	38	16	Green Bay Packers	
1996	Brett Favre† (2)	39	16	Green Bay Packers	
1997	Brett Favre† (3)	35	16	Green Bay Packers	
1998	Steve Young† (4)	36	15	San Francisco 49ers	
1999	Kurt Warner†	41	16	St. Louis Rams	
2000	Peyton Manning†	33	16	Indianapolis Colts	
2000	Daunte Culpepper	33	16	Minnesota Vikings	
2001	Kurt Warner† (2)	36	16	St. Louis Rams	
2002	Tom Brady	28	16	New England Patriots	
2003	Brett Favre† (4)	32	16	Green Bay Packers	
2004	Peyton Manning† (2)	49*	16	Indianapolis Colts	
2005	Carson Palmer	32	16	Cincinnati Bengals	
2006	Peyton Manning† (3)	31	16	Indianapolis Colts	
2007	Tom Brady (2)	50*	16	New England Patriots	
2008	Drew Brees†	34	16	New Orleans Saints	
2008	Philip Rivers	34	16	San Diego Chargers	
2009	Drew Brees† (2)	34	16	New Orleans Saints	
2010	Tom Brady (3)	36	16	New England Patriots	
2011	Drew Brees† (3)	46	16	New Orleans Saints	
2012	Drew Brees† (4)	43	16	New Orleans Saints	
2013	Peyton Manning† (4)	55*	16	Denver Broncos	
2014	Andrew Luck	40	16	Indianapolis Colts	
2015	Tom Brady (4)	36	16	New England Patriots	
2016	Aaron Rodgers^	40	16	Green Bay Packers	
2017	Russell Wilson	34	16	Seattle Seahawks	
2018	Patrick Mahomes^	50	16	Kansas City Chiefs	
2019	Lamar Jackson^	36	15	Baltimore Ravens	
2020	Aaron Rodgers^ (2)	48	16	Green Bay Packers	
2021	Tom Brady (5)	43	17	Tampa Bay Buccaneers	
2022	Patrick Mahomes^ (2)	41	17	Kansas City Chiefs	
2023	Dak Prescott^	36	17	Dallas Cowboys	
2024	Joe Burrow^	43	17	Cincinnati Bengals	
2025	Matthew Stafford^	46	17	Los Angeles Rams	

== AFL annual passing touchdowns leaders ==
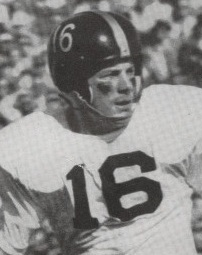
Len Dawson led the AFL in passing touchdowns four times.

Key
Symbol	Meaning
Leader	The player who recorded the most passing touchdowns in the AFL
TDs	The total number of passing touchdowns the player had
GP	The number of games played by a player during the season
†	Pro Football Hall of Fame member
*	Player set the single-season passing touchdowns record
(#)	Denotes the number of times a player appears in this list

AFL annual passing touchdowns leaders by season
Season	Leader	TDs	GP	Team	Refs
1960	Al Dorow	26*	14	New York Titans	
1961	George Blanda†	36*	14	Houston Oilers	
1962	Len Dawson†	29	14	Dallas Texans	
1963	Len Dawson† (2)	26	14	Kansas City Chiefs	
1964	Babe Parilli	31	14	Boston Patriots	
1965	Len Dawson† (3)	21	14	Kansas City Chiefs	
1966	Len Dawson† (4)	26	14	Kansas City Chiefs	
1967	Daryle Lamonica	30	14	Oakland Raiders	
1968	John Hadl	27	14	San Diego Chargers	
1969	Daryle Lamonica (2)	34	14	Oakland Raiders	

== AAFC annual passing touchdowns leaders ==
Frankie Albert threw 29 touchdown passes in the 1948 AAFC season, the most for any professional quarterback for eleven years.

Key
Symbol	Meaning
Leader	The player who recorded the most passing touchdowns in the AAFC
TDs	The total number of passing touchdowns the player had
GP	The number of games played by a player during the season
†	Pro Football Hall of Fame member
*	Player set the single-season passing touchdowns record
(#)	Denotes the number of times a player appears in this list

AAFC annual passing touchdowns leaders by season
Season	Leader	TDs	GP	Team	Refs
1946	Otto Graham†	17*	14	Cleveland Browns	
1947	Otto Graham† (2)	25*	14	Cleveland Browns	
1948	Frankie Albert	29*	14	San Francisco 49ers	
1949	Frankie Albert (2)	27	12	San Francisco 49ers	

== Most seasons leading the league ==
Count	Player	Seasons	Team(s)	Ref.
5	Tom Brady	2002, 2007, 2010, 2015, 2021	New England Patriots (4) / Tampa Bay Buccaneers (1)	
4	Drew Brees	2008, 2009, 2011, 2012	New Orleans Saints	
4	Len Dawson	1962, 1963, 1965, 1966	Kansas City Chiefs	
4	Brett Favre	1995–1997, 2002	Green Bay Packers	
4	Peyton Manning	2000, 2004, 2006, 2013	Indianapolis Colts (3) / Denver Broncos (1)	
4	Johnny Unitas	1957–1960	Baltimore Colts	
4	Steve Young	1992–1994, 1998	San Francisco 49ers	
3	Otto Graham	1946, 1947, 1952	Cleveland Browns	
3	Arnie Herber	1932, 1934, 1936	Green Bay Packers	
3	Sid Luckman	1943, 1945, 1946	Chicago Bears	
3	Dan Marino	1984–1986	Miami Dolphins	
3	Y. A. Tittle	1955, 1962, 1963	San Francisco 49ers (1) / New York Giants (2)	
2	Frankie Albert	1948, 1949	San Francisco 49ers	
2	Sammy Baugh	1940, 1947	Washington Redskins	
2	Terry Bradshaw	1978, 1982	Pittsburgh Steelers	
2	John Brodie	1965, 1970	San Francisco 49ers	
2	Jim Everett	1988, 1989	Los Angeles Rams	
2	Frank Filchock	1939, 1944	Washington Redskins	
2	Dan Fouts	1981, 1982	San Diego Chargers	
2	Roman Gabriel	1969, 1971	Los Angeles Rams (1) / Philadelphia Eagles (1)	
2	John Hadl	1968, 1971	San Diego Chargers	
2	Cecil Isbell	1941, 1942	Green Bay Packers	
2	Sonny Jurgensen	1961, 1967	Philadelphia Eagles (1) / Washington Redskins (1)	
2	Daryle Lamonica	1967, 1969	Oakland Raiders	
2	Patrick Mahomes	2018, 2022	Kansas City Chiefs	
2	Joe Montana	1982, 1987	San Francisco 49ers	
2	Aaron Rodgers	2016, 2020	Green Bay Packers	
2	Tobin Rote	1955, 1956	Green Bay Packers	
2	Frank Ryan	1964, 1966	Cleveland Browns	
2	Ken Stabler	1974, 1976	Oakland Raiders	
2	Kurt Warner	1999, 2001	St. Louis Rams	
2	Bob Waterfield	1945, 1946	Cleveland / Los Angeles Rams	

== See also ==
- List of NFL annual passing yards leaders
- List of NFL annual pass completion percentage leaders
- List of NFL annual passer rating leaders
- List of NFL career passing touchdowns leaders
- List of NFL career passing yards leaders
