= Arnie Herber =

American football player (1910–1969)

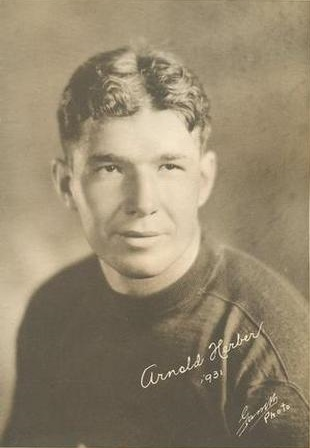

No. 12, 26, 41, 45, 38, 20
- Position: Quarterback

Personal information
- Born: April 2, 1910; Green Bay, Wisconsin, U.S.
- Died: October 14, 1969 (aged 59); Green Bay, Wisconsin, U.S.
- Listed height: 5 ft 11 in (1.80 m)
- Listed weight: 203 lb (92 kg)

Career information
- High school: Green Bay West (WI)
- College: Wisconsin (1928); Regis (1929)

Career history
- Green Bay Packers (1930–1940); New York Giants (1944–1945)

Awards and highlights
- 4× NFL champion (1930, 1931, 1936, 1939); First-team All-Pro (1932); 2× Second-team All-Pro (1935, 1936); Pro Bowl (1939); 3× NFL passing yards leader (1932, 1934, 1936); 3× NFL passing touchdowns leader (1932, 1934, 1936); 3× NFL passer rating leader (1934, 1936, 1939); NFL completion percentage leader (1936); NFL 1930s All-Decade Team; Green Bay Packers Hall of Fame

Career statistics
- Passing attempts: 1,175
- Passing completions: 481
- Completion percentage: 40.9%
- TD–INT: 81–106
- Passing yards: 8,041
- Passer rating: 50.1
- Rushing yards: 116
- Rushing touchdowns: 3
- Stats at Pro Football Reference
- Pro Football Hall of Fame

Arnold Charles "Flash" Herber (April 2, 1910 – October 14, 1969) was an American professional football player who was a quarterback in the National Football League (NFL) for 13 seasons, primarily with the Green Bay Packers. During his Packers tenure from 1930 to 1940, he led the league in passing yards and touchdowns three times (becoming the first player to lead each category three times in NFL history) and won four NFL Championship Games. Herber retired after 11 seasons in Green Bay, but returned in 1944 with New York Giants, where he played his final two seasons. He was inducted to the Pro Football Hall of Fame in 1966.

== Early life ==
Born in Green Bay, Wisconsin, Herber was a Packers fan from a young age, all while starring at local Green Bay West High School in football and basketball. He played two years of college football, where he was on the freshman team with the Wisconsin Badgers and spent his sophomore season with the Regis Rangers, which dropped football after the 1929 season. Herber went back to Green Bay and worked in the club house as a handyman. Coach Curly Lambeau gave Herber a try-out and Herber at age 20 joined a team that was currently dominating the National Football League (NFL).

== Professional career ==
=== Green Bay Packers ===
Green Bay had posted an undefeated 12–0–1 record and won the NFL title in 1929, the year before Herber was on the roster. In his first year, the Packers continued their success and won another title with Herber playing tailback in the famous Notre Dame Box formation. In 1931, with Herber throwing more than usual for that era to early greats like Johnny Blood, the Packers reeled off nine straight wins to start the season and won a third straight title. No other team in NFL history, besides the Packers themselves in the 1960s, has won three consecutive titles.

The NFL did not start keeping statistics until 1932—when they did that year, Herber finished as the top passer in the league with 639 yards and nine touchdowns. He won the passing title again in 1934 with 799 yards and eight touchdowns. But Herber reached his peak as a pro starting in 1935 with the arrival of Don Hutson, the league's first true wide receiver, who changed the game with his graceful moves, precise patterns, and superb hands. Herber loved to throw the ball long and was a perfect fit for Hutson's talent. Hutson's first NFL reception was an 83-yard touchdown pass from Herber on the first play of the game when the Packers beat the Chicago Bears, 7–0. In 1936, Herber and Hutson rewrote the NFL passing-receiving record book. Herber tossed a record 177 passes for a record 1,239 yards, and 11 touchdowns. Hutson set new records with 34 catches, 526 yards receiving, and eight touchdowns, all marks he would soon improve. Green Bay finished 10–1–1 and went to the NFL title game, which they won 21–6 over the Boston Redskins at the Polo Grounds in New York. In that game, Green Bay passed for 153 yards and Herber threw two touchdowns, one to Hutson.

Sharing time with another great passer, Cecil Isbell, Herber led the Packers to the title game again in 1938 and 1939. In the 1938 championship game, Green Bay lost to the New York Giants 23–17 at the Polo Grounds, despite another touchdown pass from Herber. In 1939, Green Bay avenged that loss with a 27–0 drubbing of the Giants in Milwaukee. Herber threw for another touchdown in the 1939 title game. In 1940, Isbell began to get more playing time and Herber was waived at the end of training camp in 1941, and retired after 11 seasons with Green Bay.

=== New York Giants ===
At age 34, Herber came back to the war-depleted NFL in 1944, answering a call to play for the New York Giants. Herber threw sparingly but efficiently, for 651 yards and six touchdowns. As usual for Herber-led teams, the Giants won their conference and went to the NFL title game. Herber's old squad, the Green Bay Packers, still featuring Don Hutson, beat the Giants 14–7. Herber played one more season with the Giants in 1945 and then retired for good.

== Legacy ==
Overall, Herber passed for 8,041 yards, 81 touchdowns, and 106 interceptions. He led his teams to four NFL championships. At the time of Herber's first retirement in 1940, he had equaled Benny Friedman for the all-time lead in touchdown passes with 66. He added to his total later when he came out of retirement for a two-year stint with the New York Giants.

Herber was the first great long thrower in the NFL and his success paved the way for truly "modern" quarterbacks Sammy Baugh and Sid Luckman. Herber was said to throw the ball with all five fingers on the laces, a peculiarity shared by no one else. It was his performance with Don Hutson, however, that made him a legend and assured his place in the Pro Football Hall of Fame in 1966. He was elected to the Wisconsin Athletic Hall of Fame in 1968.

During the NFL's 50th season celebration in 1969, Herber was selected to the All-1930s team in August. Two months later, he died of cancer at age 59 in Green Bay, and is buried at its Fort Howard Memorial Park. He was inducted into the Green Bay Packers Hall of Fame in 1972.

== Professional statistics ==
Legend
	Led the league
**Bold**	Career high

Year	Team	Games		Passing								Rushing				Fumbles	
Year	Team	GP	GS	Cmp	Att	Pct	Yds	Avg	TD	Int	Rtg	Att	Yds	Avg	TD	Fum	Lost
1930	GB	10	4	—	—	—	—	—	3	—	—	—	—	—	—	1	1
1931	GB	3	0	—	—	—	—	—	—	—	—	—	—	—	**1**	2	1
1932	GB	**14**	**8**	37	101	36.6	639	6.3	9	9	51.5	**64**	**149**	**2.3**	**1**	**3**	**2**
1933	GB	11	6	50	124	40.3	656	5.3	3	12	26.2	62	77	1.2	0	0	0
1934	GB	11	7	42	115	36.5	799	6.9	8	12	45.1	37	33	0.9	0	0	0
1935	GB	11	**8**	48	109	36.7	729	6.7	8	14	45.4	19	0	0.0	0	0	0
1936	GB	12	5	**77**	**173**	44.5	**1,239**	7.2	**11**	**13**	58.9	20	-32	-1.6	0	0	0
1937	GB	9	0	47	104	**45.2**	684	6.6	7	10	50.0	5	9	1.8	0	0	0
1938	GB	8	4	22	55	40.0	336	6.1	3	4	48.8	6	-1	-0.2	0	2	**2**
1939	GB	10	7	57	139	41.0	1,107	7.9	8	9	61.6	18	-11	-0.6	0	1	1
1940	GB	10	4	38	89	42.7	560	6.3	6	7	53.6	6	-23	-3.8	0	0	0
1944	NYG	10	3	36	86	41.9	651	7.6	6	8	53.0	7	-58	-8.3	0	0	0
1945	NYG	10	0	35	80	43.8	641	**8.0**	9	8	**69.8**	6	-27	-4.5	0	**3**	1
Total		129	56	481	1,175	40.9	8,041	6.84	81	106	50.1	250	116	0.5	2	12	7
