= A formation =

Formation in American football

In American football, the A formation was a variation of the single-wing formation used with great success by the New York Giants of the 1930s and early 1940s. This formation was masterminded by Giants coach Steve Owen and relied heavily upon Hall of Fame center Mel Hein for its success.

The A formation differed from the traditional single-wing in that the quarterback played further back from the line and closer to the center. It also placed the backfield opposite the "strong" side of the unbalanced line, providing more flexibility in the running game (though less power). The wingback is on the opposite side compared to the single-wing and the quarterback is the primary passer, rather than the tailback. The name of the formation was arbitrary, not from its slight resemblance to the letter "A", unlike formations named "I", "T", "V", and "Y" for the shapes formed by the backs' positioning; Owen labeled the standard single wing his team's "B" formation.

One major advantage of the A is the center could snap the ball to any of three players; typically to the fullback or blocking back for runs and the quarterback for passes. The fourth back, the wingback, became a crucial part of the system when Owen introduced a half-spin sweep series in 1938 which featured a wide sweep play to the motioning wingback, a dive inside by the deep fullback, and a bootleg threat away from sweep action by the quarterback. This triple-threat, highly deceptive series anticipated the Wing-T Buck Sweep series by well over a decade.

A great center like Hein was a major asset, albeit not essential, in running the A formation — however only the Giants used this set-up with any frequency. This gave the Giants an advantage in that teams had to prepare specifically to defend the A whenever they played New York.

Coach Owen experimented with the A from the early 1930s on. Mel Hein joined the Giants in 1931, but Owen didn't use the A full-time until 1937. The Giants, using the A, became the first team to win their second official NFL championship games when they defeated the Green Bay Packers 23–17, adding this 1938 title to their 1934 defeat of Chicago. Green Bay ran the Notre Dame Box, another unique single-wing variant. The 1938 win was the last time the A brought the Giants a title, however, as George Halas' modern T formation began to dominate professional football after 1940. Mel Hein retired after the 1945 season and proved difficult to replace. The Giants and their A formation were beaten for the NFL championship by the Chicago Bears and the T in 1941 and 1946. Owen finally installed the T formation as an additional offense in 1948, although the Giants continued to run the A through his retirement in 1954. No other team used the A formation in the NFL and the offense today is used only by some aficionados at and below high school varsity level. Ted Seay is known to many of them as a coach who decades later developed greater passing possibilities from the nearly forgotten A.

== See also ==
- Single-wing
- T formation
- Notre Dame Box
