= Steve Owen (gridiron football) =

American football player and coach (1898–1964)

- Owen circa 1930

No. 9, 36, 44, 50, 12, 55, 6
- Positions: Tackle, guard

Personal information
- Born: April 21, 1898; Cleo Springs, Territory of Oklahoma, U.S.
- Died: May 17, 1964 (aged 66); Oneida, New York, U.S.
- Listed height: 5 ft 10 in (1.78 m)
- Listed weight: 237 lb (108 kg)

Career information
- High school: Aline (OK)
- College: Oklahoma A&M College, Phillips (OK)

Career history

Playing
- Kansas City Blues (1924); Hartford Blues (1925); Cleveland Bulldogs (1925); Kansas City Cowboys (1925); New York Giants (1926–1931, 1933)

Coaching
- New York Giants (1930–1953) Head coach; South Carolina (1954) Spring practice assistant; Baylor (1954) Spring practice assistant; Baylor (1955) Assistant; Philadelphia Eagles (1956–1957) Defensive assistant; Toronto Argonauts (1959) Interim head coach; Calgary Stampeders (1960) Interim head coach; Saskatchewan Roughriders (1961–1962) Head coach; Syracuse Stormers (1963) Head coach

Awards and highlights
- As player: NFL champion (1927); First-team All-Pro (1927); NFL 1920s All-Decade Team; 54th greatest New York Giant of all-time; As head coach: 2× NFL champion (1934, 1938); Giants career wins record (153); New York Giants Ring of Honor; Annis Stukus Trophy (1962)

Head coaching record
- Regular season: NFL: 153–100–17 (.598); WIFU/CFL: 21–27–3 (.441)
- Postseason: NFL: 2–8 (.200); WIFU/CFL: 0–4 (.000)
- Career: NFL: 155–108–17 (.584); WIFU/CFL: 21–31–3 (.409)
- Coaching profile at Pro Football Reference
- Stats at Pro Football Reference
- Pro Football Hall of Fame

Stephen Joseph Owen (April 21, 1898 – May 17, 1964) was an American professional football player and coach. He earned a place in the Pro Football Hall of Fame as head coach of the National Football League (NFL)'s New York Giants for 24 seasons, from 1930 to 1953.

Owen's skill at designing defenses, his fundamentals-centered approach to the game and his innovative "A formation," a variation on the single-wing, also helped his offenses thrive and were key to his success. His personal style was memorable for the odd congruence of gravelly voice and easy disposition to go with his perpetual tobacco chewing.

== Early life and college ==
Born in Cleo Springs in Oklahoma Territory, Owen was raised in an area known as the Cherokee Strip, where his original goal was to become a jockey, a dream denied by his 5 ft 11 in (1.80 m), 230 lb (104 kg) frame that earned him the nickname "Stout Steve."

While working on a cattle ranch, he attended Phillips University in Enid, where he was an all-around athlete in 1917–18. He supplemented his income at that time as a professional wrestler under the pseudonym "Jack O'Brien," a ruse to preserve his amateur status.

Owen served in the U.S. Army training corps in World War I, then returned to coach for a year at Phillips before going to work in oil fields in various parts of the Southwest.

== Professional playing and coaching career ==
=== Early career (1924–1929) ===
Owen started to play pro football in 1924, at $50 a game, for the NFL's Kansas City Cowboys (who played all their games on the road). After playing for the Cowboys and then the Cleveland Bulldogs in 1925, he was sold to the New York Giants in 1926 for $500. After a futile attempt to get a cut of the purchase price from Kansas City coach Leroy Andrews, he later said of the sale:

I had seen a lot of fat hogs go for more than they paid for me. But in those days, a fat hog was a lot more valuable than a fat tackle. I was going to New York even if I had to walk there.

His leadership became clearly evident during the 1927 season as captain of a team that outscored opponents 197–20, went 11–1–1 and won the NFL title.

=== New York Giants head coach (1930–1953) ===
In 1930, he was promoted to co-player-coach for the final two games of the season with another future Hall of Famer, Benny Friedman. The 2–0 finish was a premonition of Owen's future long-term success as sole head coach starting the following season. In an unusual move for the time, he didn't sign a formal contract with owner Tim Mara. He would coach the next 23 years on a handshake. He retired as a player following the 1931 season, except for a brief comeback in 1933, helping the Giants go 11–3 and get to the title game, the first of eight appearances the Giants would make during his tenure.

The team slipped to 8–5 in 1934, but still made the NFL championship game again. Facing the 13–0 Chicago Bears, the Giants came in as huge underdogs and trailed 10–3 at halftime. The icy conditions and 9 °F (5.0 °C) weather led to an adjustment between halves that became a memorable part of National Football League lore. A friend of the Maras owned a nearby shoe warehouse, and opened it on that freezing Sunday afternoon to supply the entire team with new sneakers for better footing on the frozen turf than they had had with conventional cleats, enabling them to run off 27 unanswered points in the second half for a 30–13 win and the team's first title. More than seven decades later, the contest is still remembered as "the sneakers game."

Despite the institution of the NFL draft due to the continued dominance of the Bears and Giants, the Giants returned to the championship game in 1935 and won their second and last title under Owen in 1938, 23–17 over the Green Bay Packers despite being outgained in yardage 379–208, with nine points on two blocked punts the margin of victory. New York appeared in four more season-ending NFL title clashes under Owen, but lost them all. An early World War II Three Stooges short referred to them when Moe sarcastically asked a hulking adversary, "Did you ever play footborl for da Giants?!"

In 1950, the Giants faced a powerful new foe with the arrival of the All-America Football Conference champion Cleveland Browns. The Browns consigned them to runner-up finishes in each of the next three seasons, though Owen's "umbrella defense" shut down passing attacks and made life miserable for the first-place Browns. New York won four of their six regular-season meetings but dropped a defensive playoff struggle with them after finishing tied with the Browns for the Eastern Division title at the end of the 1950 season.

Owen was the host of Pro Football Highlights on the DuMont Television Network from 1951 to 1953.

After the Giants slipped to 3–8 in 1953, Owen announced his retirement as head coach days before the end of the regular season, ending his 28 years at field level with the Giants. As the final minutes ticked away in his last game as Giant coach, a late-game loss to eventual champion Detroit, television cameras showed him standing alone on the sidelines in tears. His record as head coach was 150–99–17 (.596) and his 150 wins are still the most in franchise history.

=== Later career (1954–1963) ===
Owen remained with the Giants as head scout. During the 1954 season, he served as a collegiate spring practice assistant, first at South Carolina and then at Baylor. He returned to the collegiate ranks full-time in 1955 as an assistant coach at Baylor.

Just weeks after the end of the 1955 season, the Philadelphia Eagles hired Hugh Devore as head coach and added Owen as his assistant soon after. But two seasons of struggling in Philadelphia led to the entire coaching staff's dismissal, and Owen eventually became a head coach yet again, this time on an interim basis with the Canadian Football League's Toronto Argonauts on September 21, 1959.

The Argonauts declined Owen's offer to stay on as full-time head coach for 1960, but retained him as a scout and advisor before he moved to the CFL's Calgary Stampeders on August 23, 1960, as interim head coach, but as in Toronto Owen was replaced at the end of the season. On December 29 of the same year, he was named head coach of the Saskatchewan Roughriders, a CFL team that had won just once in 1960. Owen's 1961 team nearly reached the playoffs, then did so the following year and was voted CFL Coach of the Year. But after suffering a heart attack late in 1962, he resigned on January 6, 1963.

Unable to stay away from the sport, however, he soon came back as head coach of the United Football League's Syracuse Stormers on March 20, 1963. After an 0–12 season, Owen returned to the New York Giants that November to scout for them.

== Death ==
Owen was stricken with a terminal cerebral hemorrhage in May 1964. After eight days in critical care, Owens died at age 66 on May 17 in Oneida, New York. He was buried at St. Patrick's Cemetery in Oneida.

Owen was inducted into the Pro Football Hall of Fame as a member of its fourth class in 1966, enshrined on September 17.

== Head coaching record ==
Team	Year	Regular season					Postseason			
Team	Year	Won	Lost	Ties	Win %	Finish	Won	Lost	Win %	Result
NYG	1931	7	6	1	.538	5th in NFL	-	-	-	-
NYG	1932	4	6	2	.400	5th in NFL	-	-	-	-
NYG	1933	11	3	0	.538	1st in Eastern Division	0	1	.000	Lost NFL Championship to Chicago Bears
NYG	1934	8	5	0	.538	1st in Eastern Division	1	0	1.000	Won NFL Championship over Chicago Bears
NYG	1935	9	3	0	.750	1st in Eastern Division	0	1	.000	Lost NFL Championship to Detroit Lions
NYG	1936	5	6	1	.455	3rd in Eastern Division	-	-	-	-
NYG	1937	6	3	2	.667	2nd in Eastern Division	-	-	-	-
NYG	1938	8	2	1	.800	1st in Eastern Division	1	0	1.000	Won NFL Championship over Green Bay Packers
NYG	1939	9	1	1	.900	1st in Eastern Division	0	1	.000	Lost NFL Championship to Green Bay Packers
NYG	1940	6	4	1	.600	3rd in Eastern Division	-	-	-	-
NYG	1941	8	3	0	.727	1st in Eastern Division	0	1	.000	Lost NFL Championship to Chicago Bears
NYG	1942	5	5	1	.500	3rd in Eastern Division	-	-	-	-
NYG	1943	6	3	1	.667	T-1st in Eastern Division	0	1	.000	Lost Eastern Division playoff to Washington Redskins
NYG	1944	8	1	1	.889	1st in Eastern Division	0	1	.000	Lost NFL Championship to Green Bay Packers
NYG	1945	3	6	1	.333	3rd in Eastern Division	-	-	-	-
NYG	1946	7	3	1	.700	1st in Eastern Division	0	1	.000	Lost NFL Championship to Chicago Bears
NYG	1947	2	8	2	.200	5th in Eastern Division	-	-	-	-
NYG	1948	4	8	0	.333	3rd in Eastern Division	-	-	-	-
NYG	1949	6	6	0	.500	3rd in Eastern Division	-	-	-	-
NYG	1950	10	2	0	.833	T-1st in American Conference	0	1	.000	Lost American Conference playoff to Cleveland Browns
NYG	1951	9	2	1	.818	2nd in American Conference	-	-	-	-
NYG	1952	7	5	0	.583	2nd in American Conference	-	-	-	-
NYG	1953	3	9	0	.455	5th in Eastern Conference	-	-	-	-
Total		153	100	17	.605		2	8	.200	

*was an interim coach; co-coached the last two games of the 1930 season alongside Benny Friedman

== See also ==
- History of the New York Giants (1925–1978)
- List of National Football League head coaches with 50 wins
