= Tom Roberts (American football) =

American football player (1916–)

- Roberts, circa 1938

No. 39, 82, 49
- Positions: Tackle, guard

Personal information
- Born: April 1, 1916; New Troy, Michigan, U.S.
- Died: April 8, 1990 (aged 74); Chicago, Illinois, U.S.
- Listed height: 6 ft 1 in (1.85 m)
- Listed weight: 215 lb (98 kg)

Career information
- High school: New Troy
- College: DePaul
- NFL draft: 1939: 10th round, 90th overall pick

Career history
- New York Giants (1939)*; Chicago Cardinals (1940)*; New York Giants (1943); Chicago Bears (1944–1945); Akron Bears (1946)
- * Offseason or practice squad member only
- Stats at Pro Football Reference

Thomas Albert Roberts (April 1, 1916 – April 8, 1990) was an American professional football player for the Chicago Bears of the National Football League (NFL). He played college football for the DePaul Blue Demons and was selected by the New York Giants in the tenth round of the 1939 NFL draft.

== Early life ==
Thomas Albert Roberts was born on April 1, 1916, in New Troy, Michigan. He played high school football at Fenger High School in Chicago, Illinois under head coach Doug Fessenden.

== College career ==
Roberts enrolled at DePaul University to play college football for the Blue Demons. He was listed as being a sophomore in 1935. He was a two-year varsity letterman from 1937 to 1938, and a team captain in 1938.

== Professional career ==
Roberts was selected by the New York Giants in the tenth round, with the 90th overall pick, of the 1939 NFL draft. He signed with the team on June 29. He suffered a concussion during training camp and was later released.

Roberts signed with the Chicago Cardinals in 1940. He was waived on September 3 before the start of the 1940 regular season. He then served in the United States Navy during World War II.

Roberts was signed by the Giants again in 1943. He played in nine games as a reserve tackle/guard during the 1943 NFL season. He also appeared in the Giants' special play-in game against the Washington Redskins.

Roberts was traded to the Chicago Bears for Bill Petrilas on September 18, 1944. Roberts played in 16 games, starting three, for the Bears from 1944 to 1945.

Roberts played in eight games in a backup role for the Akron Bears during the 1946 American Football League season and was also the team's line coach.

== Personal life ==
After his NFL career, Roberts was a salesman for several companies. He retired in 1978 as a salesman for the Citation Box and Paper Co. in Chicago. He died on April 8, 1990, at the Bernard A. Mitchell Hospital in Chicago.
