= Irv Comp =

American football player (1919–1989)

No. 51
- Position: Back

Personal information
- Born: May 17, 1919; Milwaukee, Wisconsin, U.S.
- Died: July 11, 1989 (aged 70); Woodruff, Wisconsin, U.S.
- Listed height: 6 ft 2 in (1.88 m)
- Listed weight: 204 lb (93 kg)

Career information
- High school: Bay View (Milwaukee)
- College: Benedictine (1939–1942)
- NFL draft: 1943: 3rd round, 23rd overall pick

Career history
- Green Bay Packers (1943–1949)

Awards and highlights
- NFL champion (1944); NFL passing yards leader (1944); Green Bay Packers Hall of Fame

Career NFL statistics
- Passing attempts: 519
- Passing completions: 213
- Completion percentage: 41.0%
- TD–INT: 28–52
- Passing yards: 3,354
- Rushing yards: 519
- Rushing touchdowns: 7
- Interceptions: 34
- Stats at Pro Football Reference

Irving Henry Comp Jr. (May 17, 1919 – July 11, 1989) was an American professional football player. He played his entire seven-year National Football League (NFL) career with the Green Bay Packers and was inducted into the Green Bay Packers Hall of Fame in 1986.

Born in the Bay View section of Milwaukee, Wisconsin, Comp had sight in only one eye. He attended college and played college football at Benedictine College, then known as St. Benedict's College. He graduated in 1942, and became a member of the Ravens Hall of Fame in 1988.

Comp was the 23rd overall selection of the 1943 NFL draft, taken in the third round by the Packers. In his second season in 1944, he led Green Bay to their sixth league title, defeating the New York Giants in the NFL Championship Game. When he retired, he was the all-time leader in interceptions with 34, until he was passed the following year.
