= Len Calligaro =

American football player (1921–2011)

Profile
- Position: Blocking back

Personal information
- Born: June 24, 1921; Hurley, Wisconsin
- Died: June 15, 2011 (aged 89); Ironwood, Michigan
- Listed height: 5 ft 11 in (1.80 m)
- Listed weight: 190 lb (86 kg)

Career information
- College: Wisconsin

Career history
- New York Giants (1944); Jersey City Giants (1946-1947)

Career statistics
- Rushing attempts: 3
- Rushing yards: 4
- Touchdowns: 1
- Receptions: 2
- Receiving yards: 11
- Stats at Pro Football Reference

Len Calligaro (June 24, 1921 – June 15, 2011), sometimes known as "Calli-Goop", was an American football player.

Calligaro was born in 1921 in Hurley, Wisconsin, and attended Lincoln High School in that city. He played college football at the fullback and quarterback positions for the University of Wisconsin Badgers football teams from 1940 to 1943.

Calligaro also played professional football as a blocking back in the National Football League (NFL) for the 1944 New York Giants. He appeared in 10 NFL games, six as a starter. He broke his leg in the preseason and missed the 1945 season. He played for the Jersey City Giants of the American Football League during the 1946 and 1947 seasons.

Calligaro died in 2011 in Ironwood, Michigan.
