= John Weiss (American football) =

American football player (1921–1990)

- Weiss in his later years

No. 11, 83, 18, 45, 28
- Position: End

Personal information
- Born: February 17, 1921; Jersey City, New Jersey, U.S.
- Died: June 10, 1990 (aged 69); Jersey City, New Jersey, U.S.
- Listed height: 6 ft 3 in (1.91 m)
- Listed weight: 198 lb (90 kg)

Career information
- High school: Henry Snyder (Jersey City)
- College: None

Career history
- New York Giants (1944–1947); Jersey City Giants (1946–1950)
- Stats at Pro Football Reference

John George Weiss (February 17, 1921 – June 10, 1990) was an American professional football player who was an end for the New York Giants of the National Football League (NFL).

== Early life ==
John George Weiss was born on February 17, 1921, in Jersey City, New Jersey. He played high school football at Henry Snyder High School in Jersey City and was a "star" end, earning all-state honors. He dropped out of high school and worked at a shipyard. Weiss served in the United States Marine Corps during World War II and was discharged in 1944.

== Professional career ==
On August 3, 1944, Weiss signed with the New York Giants of the National Football League (NFL) despite having no college or pro football experience. He was recommended to the team by fellow Giants player Joe Sulaitis, who also did not have any college football experience. Weiss played in all ten regular season games for the Giants during the 1944 season in a reserve role and caught one pass for ten yards. He also appeared in the 1944 NFL Championship Game, which the Giants lost to the Green Bay Packers by a score of 14–7. Weiss started all ten games at end for the Giants in 1945, recording four receptions for 82 yards and one touchdown, two fumble recoveries, and two kick returns for 36 yards as the team finished with a record of 3–6–1.

On January 16, 1946, Weiss re-signed with the Giants for the 1946 season. He played in seven games for New York in 1946, catching four passes for 70 yards and one touchdown. He was honored by the Giants in 1946 with a "John Weiss Day". In November 1946, the The Jersey Journal noted that Weiss and Sulaitis were among the few players without collegiate experience who had "made good" in the NFL. After the December 1, 1946, game against the Los Angeles Rams at the Polo Grounds, the Haskell Social and Athletic Club of Jersey City presented Weiss with several gifts. He appeared in one game for the New York Giants in 1947.

Weiss also played on and off for the Jersey City Giants of the American Football League from 1946 to 1950. He played in 37 games, starting 26, overall during his time with the Jersey Giants, totaling 32 receptions, 554 receiving yards, seven receiving touchdowns, and one interception return touchdown (although receptions and receiving yards records are incomplete).

== Personal life ==
Weiss lived in Jersey City his entire life. He worked as a warehouseman at Acme Markets for 33 years until retiring in 1984. He died on June 10, 1990, at Jersey City Medical Center.
