= Bill Petrilas =

American football player (1915–1976)

- Petrilas, circa 1947

No. 2, 5, 18, 29, 26, 62
- Position: Halfback

Personal information
- Born: September 28, 1915; New Haven, Connecticut, U.S.
- Died: November 4, 1976 (aged 61); Middletown, Connecticut, U.S.
- Listed height: 6 ft 1 in (1.85 m)
- Listed weight: 195 lb (88 kg)

Career information
- High school: James Hillhouse (New Haven)

Career history
- Hartford Blues (1941); Brooklyn Dodgers (1942)*; Wilmington Clippers (1942); Chicago Bears (1944)*; New York Giants (1944–1945); Wilmington Clippers (1946); Ottawa Trojans (1947)
- * Offseason or practice squad member only
- Stats at Pro Football Reference

William Anthony Petrilas (September 28, 1915 – November 4, 1976) was an American professional football halfback who played for the New York Giants of the National Football League (NFL).

== Early life ==
William Anthony Petrilas was born on September 28, 1915, in New Haven, Connecticut. He was a "star" high school football player at James Hillhouse High School in New Haven.

== Professional career ==
Petrilas first played professional football for the Stratford Rams, based out of Stratford, Connecticut. He played for the Hartford Blues in 1941. He signed with the Brooklyn Dodgers of the National Football League (NFL) on August 12, 1942, but was released on August 20, 1942. Petrilas then played the 1942 season with the independent Wilmington Clippers, appearing in nine games while starting two.

Petrilas signed with the Chicago Bears on July 28, 1944. He was traded to the New York Giants for Tom Roberts on September 18, 1944. Petrilas played in 14 games, starting four, for the Giants from 1944 to 1945, totaling seven interceptions for 145 yards and two touchdowns, 12 carries for 29 yards, and four punt returns for 58 yards. His two interception return touchdowns in 1944 were tied with Don Perkins for the NFL lead. Petrilas also appeared in the 1944 NFL Championship Game in a reserve role. He missed part of the 1945 season while serving in the United States Navy during World War II.

In July 1946, Petrilas signed with the Wilmington Clippers for the 1946 American Football League season and played in five games (three starts). He started all ten games for the Ottawa Trojans of the Ontario Rugby Football Union (ORFU) in 1947 and scored three touchdowns. The Trojans lost in the Eastern Final to the eventual Grey Cup-champion Toronto Argonauts. Petrilas was named an ORFU All-Star for his performance during the 1947 season.

== Personal life ==
Petrilas died on November 4, 1976, in Middletown, Connecticut.
