= Rocky Uguccioni =

American football player (1918–)

No. 35
- Position: End

Personal information
- Born: April 20, 1918; New London, Connecticut, U.S.
- Died: January 12, 2005 (aged 86); New London, Connecticut, U.S.
- Listed height: 6 ft 0 in (1.83 m)
- Listed weight: 195 lb (88 kg)

Career information
- High school: Bulkeley (Hartford, Connecticut)
- College: None

Career history
- Brooklyn Tigers (1944); New York Yankees (1946)*
- * Offseason or practice squad member only
- Stats at Pro Football Reference

Edward Enrico "Rocky" Uguccioni (April 20, 1918 – January 12, 2005) was an American professional football end who played for the Brooklyn Tigers of the National Football League (NFL).

== Early life ==
Edward Enrico Uguccioni was born on April 20, 1918, in New London, Connecticut. He played basketball at Bulkeley High School in Hartford, Connecticut, and graduated in 1937.

== Professional career ==
A few sources say Uguccioni played college football at Murray State Teachers College but this does not appear to have happened. In 1937, at the age of 19, he was playing for the Electric Boat Diesels of New London, Connecticut. In 1943, he was still playing for the Diesels.

Uguccioni played in all ten games, starting one, for the Brooklyn Tigers of the National Football League (NFL) in 1944 as an end and caught seven passes for 94 yards. On October 15, 1944, against the New York Giants, Brooklyn's Ray Hare blocked Len Younce's kick and Uguccioni returned it for a 12-yard touchdown. The Tigers finished the year with an 0–10 record.

Uguccioni spent the 1945 in the United States Navy and played for the 1945 Fleet City Bluejackets. He signed a two-year contract with the New York Yankees of the All-America Football Conference on January 6, 1946. He reported to training camp in July 1946 but was released before ever playing for the Yankees. Uguccioni played the 1946 season with the minor league Providence Steam Rollers.

== Personal life ==
Uguccioni was an installer for the Southern New England Telephone Company for 35 years until retiring in 1986. He died on January 12, 2005, at Lawrence + Memorial Hospital in New London, Connecticut.
