= Roland Caranci =

American football player (1921–1998)

Profile
- Position: Tackle

Personal information
- Born: March 4, 1921; Marshall, Colorado
- Died: February 26, 1998 (aged 76); Arlington Heights, Illinois
- Listed height: 6 ft 2 in (1.88 m)
- Listed weight: 214 lb (97 kg)

Career information
- High school: Boulder (CO)
- College: Colorado

Career history
- New York Giants (1944)
- Stats at Pro Football Reference

Roland Caranci (March 4, 1921 – February 26, 1998) was an American football tackle. He played for the New York Giants in 1944.
