= Jim Sivell =

American football player (1914–1997)

No. 28, 33, 41
- Position: Guard

Personal information
- Born: March 12, 1914; Chipley, Georgia, U.S.
- Died: March 16, 1997 (aged 83); Troup County, Georgia, U.S.
- Listed height: 5 ft 9 in (1.75 m)
- Listed weight: 205 lb (93 kg)

Career information
- High school: Monroe Academy (Monroeville, Alabama)
- College: Auburn (1934-1937)
- NFL draft: 1938: 10th round, 83rd overall pick

Career history
- Brooklyn Dodgers/Tigers (1938–1942, 1944); New York Giants (1944–1946); Miami Seahawks (1946)

Awards and highlights
- Pro Bowl (1941); Third-team All-American (1937)

Career NFL statistics
- Games played: 80
- Games started: 49
- Fumble recoveries: 1
- Stats at Pro Football Reference

Ralph James "Happy" Sivell (March 12, 1914 – March 16, 1997) was an American professional football player who was a guard in the National Football League (NFL) and the All-America Football Conference (AAFC). He played college football for the Auburn Tigers and was selected in the tenth round of the 1938 NFL draft with the 83rd overall pick. He played for the NFL's Brooklyn Dodgers/Tigers (1938–1942, 1944) and New York Giants (1944–1945) and the AAFC's Miami Seahawks (1946).
