= Joe Sulaitis =

American football player (1921–1980)

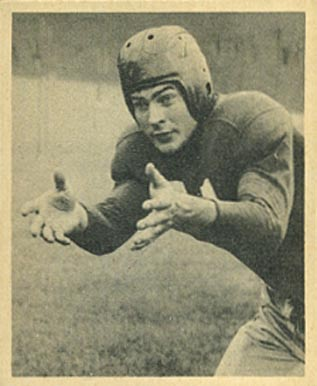
- Sulaitis on a 1948 Bowman football card

Profile
- Position: Running back

Personal information
- Born: June 20, 1921; Hoboken, New Jersey, U.S.
- Died: February 8, 1980 (aged 58); Point Pleasant, New Jersey, U.S.

Career information
- High school: Dickinson (Jersey City, New Jersey)
- College: None

Career history
- 1943–1945: New York Giants
- 1946: Boston Yanks
- 1947–1953: New York Giants

Joseph Sulaitis (June 20, 1921, in Hoboken, New Jersey – February 8, 1980, in Point Pleasant, New Jersey) was an American football running back for the New York Giants of the NFL from 1943 to 1953.

Sulaitis played high school football at William L. Dickinson High School in Jersey City, New Jersey. He signed with the Giants in 1943 despite having no college or pro football experience.
