= 1944 NFL Championship Game =

Coordinates: 40.831°N 73.937°W

Green Bay Packers (Western) (8–2)	New York Giants (Eastern) (8–1–1)
14	7
Head coach: Curly Lambeau	Head coach: Steve Owen
	1	2	3	4	Total
GB	0	14	0	0	14
NYG	0	0	0	7	7
- Date: December 17, 1944
- Stadium: Polo Grounds; Manhattan, New York
- Favorite: Green Bay by 7 points
- Referee: Ronald Gibbs
- Attendance: 46,016

Radio in the United States
- Network: Blue
- Announcers: Harry Wismer

Location in the United States

The 1944 NFL Championship Game was the 12th National Football League (NFL) title game, played on December 17 at the Polo Grounds in New York City, with an attendance of 46,016. The game featured the Green Bay Packers (8–2), champions of the Western Division versus the Eastern Division champion New York Giants (8–1–1).

== Background ==
The Packers were led by longtime head coach Curly Lambeau and its stars were running back Ted Fritsch, end Don Hutson, and quarterback Irv Comp. The Giants were led by head coach Steve Owen, running back Bill Paschal, former Packers quarterback Arnie Herber, and a dominant defense.

The Packers were slight favorites, despite the Giants' 24–0 shutout win four weeks earlier. Prior to the game, the Packers had spent over a week preparing in Charlottesville, Virginia; they had completed their regular season on November 26, while the Giants finished on December 10. If the title game ended in a tie, the teams would share the championship.

== Game recap ==
Green Bay scored two touchdowns in the second quarter then yielded one early in the fourth to win 14–7 for their sixth and final league title under Lambeau, their first since 1939.

The Packers did not return to the championship game for sixteen years, and won the following year in 1961, the first of five titles in seven seasons in the 1960s under head coach Vince Lombardi.

== Scoring summary ==
Sunday, December 17, 1944
Kickoff: 2 p.m. EWT (EDT)

- First quarter
  - no scoring
- Second quarter
  - GB – Ted Fritsch 1 run (Don Hutson kick), 7–0 GB
  - GB – Fritsch 28 pass from Irv Comp (Hutson kick), 14–0 GB
- Third quarter
  - no scoring
- Fourth quarter
  - NY – Ward Cuff 1 run (Ken Strong kick), 14–7 GB

== Officials ==
- Referee: Ronald Gibbs
- Umpire: Carl Brubaker
- Head linesman: Charlie Berry
- Field judge: Eugene Miller

The NFL had only four game officials in 1944; the back judge was added in 1947, the line judge in 1965, and the side judge in 1978.

== Players' shares ==
The players' shares were the highest to date: each Packer player received about $1,500 while each Giant saw about $900.

== See also ==
- Giants–Packers rivalry
