= 1944 Green Bay Packers season =

NFL team season

- Head coach: Curly Lambeau
- Home stadium: City Stadium; Wisconsin State Fair Park

Results
- Record: 8–2
- Division place: 1st NFL Western
- Playoffs: Won NFL Championship (at Giants) 14–7

The 1944 Green Bay Packers season was their 26th season overall and their 24th season in the National Football League. The team finished with an 8–2 record under coach Curly Lambeau, earning them a first-place finish in the Western Conference. The Packers ended the season beating the New York Giants 14–7 in the NFL Championship Game, their sixth league title. Don Hutson led the NFL in touchdowns for a record-setting eighth time in his career.

== Offseason ==
=== 1944 NFL draft ===
Round	Pick	Player	Position	School/Club Team
1	7	Merv Pregulman	Guard	Michigan
3	22	Tom Kuzma	Halfback	Michigan
5	38	Bill McPartland	Tackle	St. Mary's (CA)
6	49	Mickey McCardle	Back	USC
7	60	Jack Tracy	End	Washington
8	71	Alex Agase	Guard	Illinois
9	82	Don Whitmire	Tackle	Alabama/Navy
10	93	Bob Koch	Back	Oregon
11	104	Virgil Johnson	End	Arkansas
12	115	Roy Giusti	Back	St. Mary's (CA)
13	126	Bill Baughman	Center	Alabama
14	137	Don Griffin	Back	Illinois
15	148	Bert Gissler	End	Nebraska
16	159	Lou Shelton	Back	Oregon State
17	170	Charley Cusick	Guard	Colgate
18	181	Hugh Cox	Back	North Carolina
19	192	Kermit Davis	End	Mississippi State
20	203	Bob Johnson	Center	Purdue
21	214	Jim Cox	Tackle	Stanford
22	225	Cliff Anderson	End	Minnesota
23	236	John Wesley Perry	Back	Duke
24	247	Pete DeMaria	Guard	Purdue
25	258	Len Liss	Tackle	Marquette
26	269	Ray Jordan	Back	North Carolina
27	280	Al Grubaugh	Tackle	Nebraska
28	291	A. B. Howard	End	Mississippi State
29	302	Paul Paladino	Guard	Arkansas
30	313	Bob Butchofsky	Back	Texas A&M
31	319	Russ Deal	Guard	Indiana
32	325	Abel Gonzales	Back	SMU

== Regular season ==
=== Schedule ===
Game	Date	Opponent	Result	Record	Venue	Attendance	Recap	Sources
1	September 17	Brooklyn Tigers	**W** 14–7	1–0	State Fair Park	12,994	Recap	
2	September 24	**Chicago Bears**	**W** 42–28	2–0	City Stadium	24,362	Recap	
3	October 1	**Detroit Lions**	**W** 27–6	3–0	State Fair Park	18,556	Recap	
4	October 8	**Card-Pitt**	**W** 34–7	4–0	City Stadium	16,535	Recap	
—	Bye							
5	October 22	**Cleveland Rams**	**W** 30–21	5–0	City Stadium	18,780	Recap	
6	October 29	at **Detroit Lions**	**W** 14–0	6–0	Briggs Stadium	30,844	Recap	
7	November 5	at **Chicago Bears**	**L** 0–21	6–1	Wrigley Field	45,553	Recap	
8	November 12	at **Cleveland Rams**	**W** 42–7	7–1	League Park	17,166	Recap	
9	November 19	at New York Giants	**L** 0–24	7–2	Polo Grounds	56,481	Recap	
10	November 26	at **Card-Pitt**	**W** 35–20	8–2	Comiskey Park	7,158	Recap	
Note: Intra-division opponents are in **bold** text.

== Standings ==
NFL Western Division
	W	L	T	PCT	DIV	PF	PA	STK
Green Bay Packers	8	2	0	.800	7–1	238	141	W1
Chicago Bears	6	3	1	.667	4–3–1	258	172	W2
Detroit Lions	6	3	1	.667	4–3–1	216	151	W4
Cleveland Rams	4	6	0	.400	4–4	188	224	L2
Card-Pitt	0	10	0	.000	0–8	108	328	L10

Note: Tie games were not officially counted in the standings until 1972.

== Postseason ==
Week	Date	Opponent	Result	Record	Venue	Attendance	Recap	Sources
NFL Championship	December 17	at New York Giants	W 14–7	1–0	Polo Grounds	46,015	Recap	

NFL Championship

Team	1	2	3	4	Total
• Packers	0	14	0	0	14
Giants	0	0	0	7	7

- Date: December 17
- Location: Polo Grounds
- Game attendance: 46,015

Scoring summary
Q2	GB	Fritsch 1 yard run (Hutson kick)	GB 7–0
Q2	GB	Fritsch 28 yard pass from Comp (Hutson kick)	GB 14–0
Q4	NYG	Cuff 1 yard run (Strong kick)	GB 14–7

== Roster ==
1944 Green Bay Packers final roster
Backs: 16 Lou Brock RB/CB/P; 51 Irv Comp RB/CB; 54 Larry Craig RB/S; 42 Paul Duhart RB/CB; 64 Ted Fritsch FB/LB/P; 24 Joe Laws RB/CB; 3 Roy McKay RB/CB/P; 8 Bob Kahler RB/CB; 23 Don Perkins FB/LB; 63 Ben Starret RB/S	Linemen/Linebackers: 47 Paul Berezney T/DT; 29 Charley Brock C/LB; 19 Mike Bucchianeri G/DG; 75 Tiny Croft T/DT; 35 Bob Flowers C/LB; 43 Buckets Goldenberg G/DG; 45 Bill Kuusisto G/DG; 72 Forrest McPherson C/LB/T/DT; 44 Baby Ray T/DT; 58 Tar Schwammel T/DT; 33 Glen Sorenson G/DG/K; 21 Pete Tinsley G/DG; 46 Chuck Tollefson G/DG	Ends/Receivers: 14 Don Hutson K; 48 Harry Jacunski; 7 Joel Mason; 18 Alex Urban; 17 Ray Wehba; Reserve: 3 Tony Canadeo RB/CB/P; Rookies in italics

== Awards, records and honors ==
- Don Hutson, NFL Leader, Touchdowns
- Don Hutson, NFL Record, Touchdown Leader, Eighth Time
