= 1932 Chicago Bears season =

NFL team season

- Owner: George Halas
- Head coach: Ralph Jones
- Home stadium: Wrigley Field

Results
- Record: 7–1–6
- League place: 1st NFL
- Playoffs: Won NFL Championship (vs. Spartans) 9–0

Team photo of the 1932 Bears.

The 1932 season was the Chicago Bears' 13th in the National Football League. The team was able to improve on their 9–4–1 record from 1931 and finished with a 7–1–6 record under third-year head coach Ralph Jones.

== Season overview ==
The season started with three consecutive 0–0 ties. After a 2–0 loss to the Packers, the Bears had scored zero points in their first four games. After that, the Bears offense improved starting with a 27–7 victory over the Staten Island Stapletons; while their defense never allowed any team, except for the Portsmouth Spartans on November 13, to score in double-digit points. The Bears were undefeated in their last nine "regular season" games (there was no established playoff system), with six wins – four of which were by shutout – and three ties.

The team that gave the Bears the most trouble was the Portsmouth Spartans. The club tied with the Spartans with identical 6–1 records (ties did not count then and were omitted), so a playoff game was set up to determine a winner. The Bears defeated the Spartans, 9–0 in the first-ever NFL postseason game. The game was played indoors at Chicago Stadium because it was expected to be cold at Wrigley Field, and organizers wanted to maximize the attendance and gate revenue.

For the year, the tandem of Red Grange and Bronko Nagurski again paced the Bears as Grange scored seven touchdowns, whereas Nagurski ran for four and passed for three more. Keith Molesworth also contributed with three touchdowns on his own while passing for three more. Luke Johnsos caught two touchdown passes and scored twice on defense as well. Coach Ralph Jones also found a kicker in Paul "Tiny" Engebretson, who had a league-leading 10 extra-point field goals made.

Despite ending with a league championship, the 1932 season was a financial disaster for the Bears, who lost $18,000 on the season. This was the only year during which the team lost money outside of the 1921 season, when the team's books closed $71.63 in the red.

== Schedule ==
| Game | Date | Opponent | Result | Record | Venue | Attendance | Recap | Sources |
|---|---|---|---|---|---|---|---|---|
| 1 | September 25 | at Green Bay Packers | T 0–0 | 0–0–1 | City Stadium | 13,000 | Recap | |
| 2 | October 2 | at Staten Island Stapletons | T 0–0 | 0–0–2 | Thompson Stadium | 8,000 | Recap | |
| 3 | October 9 | at Chicago Cardinals | T 0–0 | 0–0–3 | Wrigley Field | 7,234 | Recap | |
| 4 | October 16 | Green Bay Packers | L 0–2 | 0–1–3 | Wrigley Field | 17,500 | Recap | |
| 5 | October 23 | Staten Island Stapletons | W 27–7 | 1–1–3 | Wrigley Field | 27,540 | Recap | |
| 6 | October 30 | at Boston Braves | T 7–7 | 1–1–4 | Braves Field | 18,000 | Recap | |
| 7 | November 6 | at New York Giants | W 28–8 | 2–1–4 | Polo Grounds | 12,000 | Recap | |
| 8 | November 13 | Portsmouth Spartans | T 13–13 | 2–1–5 | Wrigley Field | 5,500 | Recap | |
| 9 | November 20 | Brooklyn Dodgers | W 20–0 | 3–1–5 | Wrigley Field | 6,500 | Recap | |
| 10 | November 24 | Chicago Cardinals | W 34–0 | 4–1–5 | Wrigley Field | 6,800 | Recap | |
| 11 | November 27 | at Portsmouth Spartans | T 7–7 | 4–1–6 | Universal Stadium | 7,000 | Recap | |
| 12 | December 4 | New York Giants | W 6–0 | 5–1–6 | Wrigley Field | | Recap | |
| 13 | December 11 | Green Bay Packers | W 9–0 | 6–1–6 | Wrigley Field | 5,000 | Recap | |
| Playoff | December 18 | Portsmouth Spartans | W 9–0 | 7–1–6 | Chicago Stadium | 11,198 | Recap | |

Note: The December 18 game was added to break the tie and is known as the 1932 NFL Playoff Game. It was moved indoors to Chicago Stadium due to inclement weather.

== Standings ==
NFL standings
| | W | L | T | PCT | PF | PA | STK |
|---|---|---|---|---|---|---|---|
| Chicago Bears ^{1} | 7 | 1 | 6 | .875 | 160 | 44 | W3 |
| Green Bay Packers | 10 | 3 | 1 | .769 | 152 | 63 | L2 |
| Portsmouth Spartans ^{1} | 6 | 2 | 4 | .750 | 116 | 71 | L1 |
| Boston Braves | 4 | 4 | 2 | .500 | 55 | 79 | W2 |
| New York Giants | 4 | 6 | 2 | .400 | 93 | 113 | L1 |
| Brooklyn Dodgers | 3 | 9 | 0 | .250 | 63 | 131 | L4 |
| Chicago Cardinals | 2 | 6 | 2 | .250 | 72 | 114 | L5 |
| Staten Island Stapletons | 2 | 7 | 3 | .222 | 77 | 173 | L1 |

Note: Tie games were not officially counted in the standings until 1972.

^{1} The Bears and Spartans records include the result of the 1932 NFL Playoff Game; thus, the Spartans are ranked third behind the Packers.

== Roster ==
1932 Chicago Bears final roster
| Backs: 8 Carl Brumbaugh QB/RB/CB/S; 5 George Corbett RB/QB/CB/S; 27 John Doehring RB/S; 77 Red Grange RB/CB; 4 Keith Molesworth QB/RB/CB/S; 3 Bronko Nagurski FB/LB; 2 Dick Nesbitt RB/CB; 7 Johnny Sisk RB/CB | Linemen: 23 Gil Bergerson G/DG; 15 Bill Buckler G/DG; 14 Lloyd Burdick T/DT; 20 Zuck Carlson G/DG; 21 Tiny Engebretsen T/DT; 29 Joe Kopcha G/DG; 76 Ookie Miller C/MG; 18 Don Murry T/DT; 26 Bert Pearson C/MG; 13 George Trafton C/MG | Ends/Receivers: 9 Paul Franklin; 56 Bill Hewitt; 24 Luke Johnsos K; 19 Cookie Tackwell K; Reserve: Link Lyman T/DT; Rookies in italics |

=== Players departed from 1931 ===
- Link Lyman, tackle (did not play for unknown reasons)

=== Future Hall of Fame players ===
- Red Grange, back
- Bill Hewitt, end (rookie from University of Michigan)
- Bronko Nagurski, fullback
- George Trafton, center

=== Other leading players ===
- Carl Brumbaugh, quarterback
- John Doehring, back (rookie)
- Paul Engebretsen, guard/kicker (rookie from Northwestern)
- Luke Johnsos, end
- Joe Kopcha, guard (back after two years off)
- Keith Molesworth, back
- Dick Nesbitt, back
- Ookie Miller, center

== Awards ==
- NFL Championship (2)
