= List of NFL champions (1920–1969) =

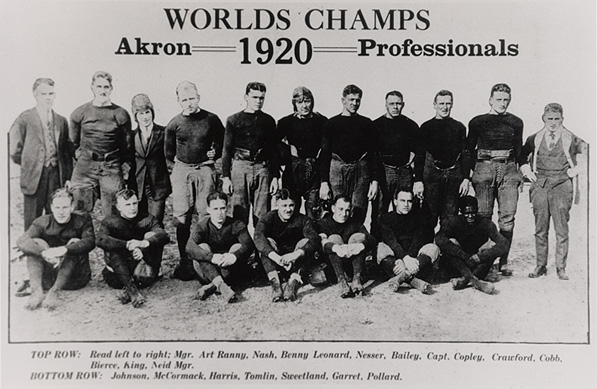
The 1920 Akron Pros were named the first APFA (NFL) champions.

The National Football League champions, prior to the merger between the National Football League (NFL) and American Football League (AFL) in 1970, were determined by two different systems. The National Football League was established on September 17, 1920, as the American Professional Football Association (APFA). The APFA changed its name in 1922 to the National Football League, which it has retained ever since. From 1921 to 1931, the APFA/NFL determined its champion by overall win–loss record, with no playoff games; ties were not counted in the winning percentage total. The APFA did not keep records of the 1920 season; they declared the Akron Pros, who finished the season with an 8–0–3 (8 wins, 0 losses, 3 ties) record, as the league's first champions by a vote of the owners. The Canton Bulldogs won two straight championships from 1922 to 1923, and the Green Bay Packers won three in a row from 1929 to 1931.

The 1932 NFL season resulted in a tie for first place between the Chicago Bears and Portsmouth Spartans, and could not be resolved by the typical win–loss system. To settle the tie, a playoff game was played; Chicago won the game and the championship. The following year, the NFL split into two divisions, and the winner of each division would play in the NFL Championship Game. In 1967, the NFL and the rival AFL agreed to merge, effective following the 1969 season; as part of this deal, the NFL champion from 1966 to 1969 would play the AFL champion in an AFL–NFL World Championship Game in each of the four seasons before the completed merger. The NFL Championship Game was ended after the 1969 season, succeeded by the NFC Championship Game. The champions of that game play the champions of the AFC Championship Game in the Super Bowl to determine the NFL champion.

From 1934 to 1967, teams were regularly awarded the Ed Thorp Memorial Trophy (a custom cast silver trophy) for winning the championship, with the team keeping the trophy for a year; the 1960, 1968, and 1969 champions were not engraved onto the trophy for inconclusive reasons. The Green Bay Packers won the most NFL championships before the merger, winning eleven of the fifty championships. The Packers were also the only team to win three straight championships, an achievement they accomplished twice: from 1929 to 1931 and from 1965 to 1967, the latter stretch being the first since the NFL went to a divisional system in 1933. The Chicago Bears won a total of eight titles, and the Cleveland Browns, Detroit Lions, and New York Giants each won four. The Bears recorded the largest victory in a championship game, defeating the Washington Redskins 73–0 in the 1940 NFL Championship Game; six other title games ended in a shutout as well. The Philadelphia Eagles recorded two consecutive shutouts in 1948 and 1949. New York City hosted the most championship games (eight), while the highest-attended title game was the 1955 NFL Championship Game, where 85,693 fans showed up in Los Angeles to watch the Browns beat the Rams 38–14.

== APFA/NFL champions (1920–1932) ==
Champion determined by win–loss percentage, with ties excluded. The number in parentheses indicates the number of championships the franchise had won to that point.

Season	Champion	Wins	Losses	Ties (Note: Ties were disregarded in the standings.)	Pct.	Runner-up	Wins	Losses	Ties	Pct.	Ref.
1920	Akron Pros (Note: No official standings were recorded for the 1920 season and teams played games against opponents outside of the league. The championship was awarded to the Akron Pros in an APFA meeting on April 30, 1921.)	8	0	3	1.000	Decatur Staleys	10	1	2	.909	
1921 (Note: Chicago beat Buffalo on a controversial tiebreaker.)	Chicago Staleys	9	1	1	.900	Buffalo All-Americans	9	1	2	.900	
1922	Canton Bulldogs	10	0	1	1.000	Chicago Bears	9	3	0	.750	
1923	Canton Bulldogs (2)	11	0	1	1.000	Chicago Bears	9	2	1	.818	
1924	Cleveland Bulldogs	7	1	1	.875	Chicago Bears	6	1	4	.857	
1925 (Note: Chicago was awarded the championship controversially because the Maroons had been suspended from the NFL for playing an exhibition game against a group of Notre Dame All-Stars.)	Chicago Cardinals	11	2	1	.846	Pottsville Maroons	10	2	0	.833	
1926	Frankford Yellow Jackets	14	1	2	.933	Chicago Bears	12	1	3	.923	
1927	New York Giants	11	1	1	.917	Green Bay Packers	7	2	1	.778	
1928	Providence Steam Roller	8	1	2	.889	Frankford Yellow Jackets	11	3	2	.786	
1929	Green Bay Packers	12	0	1	1.000	New York Giants	13	1	1	.929	
1930	Green Bay Packers (2)	10	3	1	.769	New York Giants	13	4	0	.765	
1931	Green Bay Packers (3)	12	2	0	.857	Portsmouth Spartans	11	3	0	.786	
1932 (Note: Chicago and Portsmouth finished with identical win–loss records, tying for first place in the NFL. To solve the tie, a playoff game was held between the two, counting towards the regular-season total. Chicago won the game and the championship while Portsmouth's loss dropped them to third place, behind Green Bay.)	Chicago Bears (2)	7	1	6	.875	Green Bay Packers	10	3	1	.769	

== NFL champions (1933–1969) ==
Numbers in parentheses in the table indicate the number of times that team won the NFL championship as of the championship game.

Divisions/Conferences
Eastern Division (1933–1949)^{‡}	Western Division (1933–1949)^{^}
American Conference (1950–1952)^{‡}	National Conference (1950–1952)^{^}
Eastern Conference (1953–1969)^{‡}	Western Conference (1953–1969)^{^}

NFL Championship Games
Season	Date	Winning team	Score	Losing team	Venue	City	Attendance	Ref(s)
1933	December 17, 1933	Chicago Bears (3)^{^}	23–21	New York Giants^{‡}	Wrigley Field	Chicago, Illinois	26,000	
1934	December 9, 1934	New York Giants (2)^{‡}	30–13	Chicago Bears^{^}	Polo Grounds	New York City, New York	35,059	
1935	December 15, 1935	Detroit Lions	26–7	New York Giants^{‡}	University of Detroit Stadium	Detroit, Michigan	15,000	
1936	December 13, 1936	Green Bay Packers (4)^{^}	21–6	Boston Redskins^{‡}	Polo Grounds (2) (Note: George Preston Marshall, the owner of the Boston Redskins, gave up home-field advantage and moved the game out of Fenway Park to New York due to apathy and low support in Boston.)	New York City, New York (2)	29,545	
1937	December 12, 1937	Washington Redskins^{‡}	28–21	Chicago Bears^{^}	Wrigley Field (2)	Chicago, Illinois (2)	15,870	
1938	December 11, 1938	New York Giants (3)^{‡}	23–17	Green Bay Packers^{^}	Polo Grounds (3)	New York City, New York (3)	48,120	
1939	December 10, 1939	Green Bay Packers (5)^{^}	27–0	New York Giants^{‡}	Dairy Bowl	West Allis, Wisconsin	32,279	
1940	December 8, 1940	Chicago Bears (4)^{^}	73–0	Washington Redskins^{‡}	Griffith Stadium	Washington, D.C.	36,034	
1941	December 21, 1941	Chicago Bears (5)^{^}	37–9	New York Giants^{‡}	Wrigley Field (3)	Chicago, Illinois (3)	13,341	
1942	December 13, 1942	Washington Redskins (2)^{‡}	14–6	Chicago Bears^{^}	Griffith Stadium (2)	Washington, D.C. (2)	36,006	
1943	December 26, 1943	Chicago Bears (6)^{^}	41–21	Washington Redskins^{‡}	Wrigley Field (4)	Chicago, Illinois (4)	34,320	
1944	December 17, 1944	Green Bay Packers (6)^{^}	14–7	New York Giants^{‡}	Polo Grounds (4)	New York City, New York (4)	46,016	
1945	December 16, 1945	Cleveland Rams^{^}	15–14	Washington Redskins^{‡}	Cleveland Stadium	Cleveland, Ohio	32,178	
1946	December 15, 1946	Chicago Bears (7)^{^}	24–14	New York Giants^{‡}	Polo Grounds (5)	New York City, New York (5)	58,346	
1947	December 28, 1947	Chicago Cardinals (2)^{^}	28–21	Philadelphia Eagles^{‡}	Comiskey Park	Chicago, Illinois (5)	30,759	
1948	December 19, 1948	Philadelphia Eagles^{‡}	7–0	Chicago Cardinals^{^}	Shibe Park	Philadelphia, Pennsylvania	36,309	
1949	December 18, 1949	Philadelphia Eagles (2)^{‡}	14–0	Los Angeles Rams^{^}	Los Angeles Memorial Coliseum	Los Angeles, California	27,980	
1950	December 24, 1950	Cleveland Browns^{‡}	30–28	Los Angeles Rams^{^}	Cleveland Stadium (2)	Cleveland, Ohio (2)	29,751	
1951	December 23, 1951	Los Angeles Rams (2)^{^}	24–17	Cleveland Browns^{‡}	Los Angeles Memorial Coliseum (2)	Los Angeles, California (2)	57,522	
1952	December 28, 1952	Detroit Lions (2)^{^}	17–7	Cleveland Browns^{‡}	Cleveland Stadium (3)	Cleveland, Ohio (3)	50,934	
1953	December 27, 1953	Detroit Lions (3)^{^}	17–16	Cleveland Browns^{‡}	Briggs Stadium	Detroit, Michigan (2)	54,577	
1954	December 26, 1954	Cleveland Browns (2)^{‡}	56–10	Detroit Lions^{^}	Cleveland Stadium (4)	Cleveland, Ohio (4)	43,827	
1955	December 26, 1955	Cleveland Browns (3)^{‡}	38–14	Los Angeles Rams^{^}	Los Angeles Memorial Coliseum (3)	Los Angeles, California (3)	85,693	
1956	December 30, 1956	New York Giants (4)^{‡}	47–7	Chicago Bears^{^}	Yankee Stadium	New York City, New York (6)	56,836	
1957	December 29, 1957	Detroit Lions (4)^{^}	59–14	Cleveland Browns^{‡}	Briggs Stadium (2)	Detroit, Michigan (3)	55,263	
1958	December 28, 1958	Baltimore Colts^{^}	23–17	New York Giants^{‡}	Yankee Stadium (2)	New York City, New York (7)	64,185	
1959	December 27, 1959	Baltimore Colts (2)^{^}	31–16	New York Giants^{‡}	Memorial Stadium	Baltimore, Maryland	57,545	
1960	December 26, 1960	Philadelphia Eagles (3)^{‡}	17–13	Green Bay Packers^{^}	Franklin Field	Philadelphia, Pennsylvania (2)	67,325	
1961	December 31, 1961	Green Bay Packers (7)^{^}	37–0	New York Giants^{‡}	City Stadium (Note: Lambeau Field was originally known as City Stadium.)	Green Bay, Wisconsin	39,029	
1962	December 30, 1962	Green Bay Packers (8)^{^}	16–7	New York Giants^{‡}	Yankee Stadium (3)	New York City, New York (8)	64,892	
1963	December 29, 1963	Chicago Bears (8)^{^}	14–10	New York Giants^{‡}	Wrigley Field (5)	Chicago, Illinois (6)	45,801	
1964	December 27, 1964	Cleveland Browns (4)^{‡}	27–0	Baltimore Colts^{^}	Cleveland Stadium (5)	Cleveland, Ohio (5)	79,544	
1965	January 2, 1966	Green Bay Packers (9)^{^}	23–12	Cleveland Browns^{‡}	Lambeau Field (2)	Green Bay, Wisconsin (2)	50,777	
1966	January 1, 1967	Green Bay Packers (10) (Note: Green Bay beat the American Football League's Kansas City Chiefs 35–10 in Super Bowl I.)^{^}	34–27	Dallas Cowboys^{‡}	Cotton Bowl	Dallas, Texas	74,152	
1967	December 31, 1967	Green Bay Packers (11) (Note: Green Bay beat the AFL's Oakland Raiders 33–14 in Super Bowl II.)^{^}	21–17	Dallas Cowboys^{‡}	Lambeau Field (3)	Green Bay, Wisconsin (3)	50,861	
1968	December 29, 1968	Baltimore Colts (3) (Note: Baltimore lost to the AFL's New York Jets 16–7 in Super Bowl III.)^{^}	34–0	Cleveland Browns^{‡}	Cleveland Stadium (6)	Cleveland, Ohio (6)	78,410	
1969	January 4, 1970	Minnesota Vikings (Note: Minnesota lost to the AFL's Kansas City Chiefs 23–7 in Super Bowl IV.)^{^}	27–7	Cleveland Browns^{‡}	Metropolitan Stadium	Bloomington, Minnesota	46,503	

== Total NFL championships won (1920–1969) ==
Club	Winners	Runners-up	Winning years
Green Bay Packers	11	4	1929, 1930, 1931, 1936, 1939, 1944, 1961, 1962, 1965, 1966, 1967
Chicago Bears	8	9	1921, 1932, 1933, 1940, 1941, 1943, 1946, 1963
New York Giants	4	13	1927, 1934, 1938, 1956
Detroit Lions	4	2	1935, 1952, 1953, 1957
Cleveland Browns	4	7	1950, 1954, 1955, 1964
Philadelphia Eagles	3	1	1948, 1949, 1960
Baltimore Colts	3	1	1958, 1959, 1968
Canton Bulldogs	2	0	1922, 1923
Chicago Cardinals	2	1	1925, 1947
Los Angeles Rams	2	3	1945, 1951
Washington Redskins	2	4	1937, 1942
Akron Pros	1	0	1920
Cleveland Bulldogs	1	0	1924
Providence Steam Roller	1	0	1928
Minnesota Vikings	1	0	1969
Frankford Yellow Jackets	1	1	1926
Dallas Cowboys	0	2	N/A
Buffalo All-Americans	0	1	N/A
Pottsville Maroons	0	1	N/A

== See also ==
- NFC Championship Game
- AFC Championship Game
- All-America Football Conference playoffs
