= Jim Bowdoin =

American football player (1904–1969)

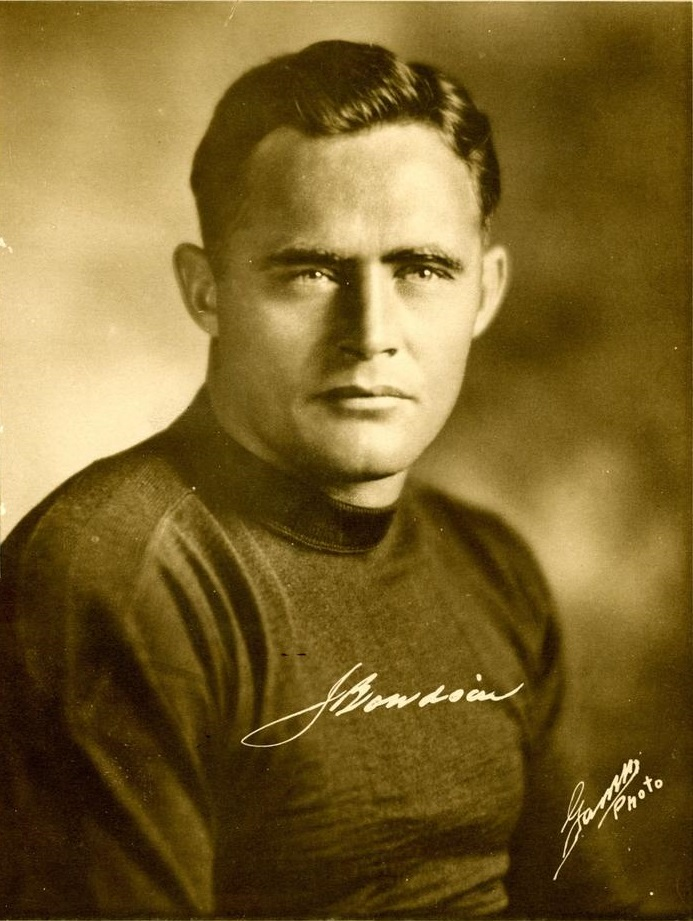

No. 19, 32, 34, 16, 55, 46, 5
- Positions: Guard, Halfback, Fullback

Personal information
- Born: January 15, 1904; Coffee Springs, Alabama, U.S.
- Died: May 11, 1969 (aged 65); Mobile, Alabama, U.S.
- Listed height: 6 ft 1 in (1.85 m)
- Listed weight: 227 lb (103 kg)

Career information
- High school: Elba (AL)
- College: Alabama

Career history
- Green Bay Packers (1928–1931); Brooklyn Dodgers (1932); New York Giants (1932); Portsmouth Spartans (1933); Brooklyn Dodgers (1934)

Awards and highlights
- 3× NFL champion (1929–1931); 2× National champion (1925, 1926)

Career NFL statistics
- Games played: 75
- Games started: 50
- Stats at Pro Football Reference

James L. (Goofy) Bowdoin (January 15, 1904 – May 11, 1969) was an American football guard for seven years, primarily with the Green Bay Packers of the National Football League (NFL). He played college football for Alabama, where he won two national championships. Bowdoin also had professional stints with the New York Giants, Portsmouth Spartans, and two separate seasons with the Brooklyn Dodgers.

== Early life and education ==
Bowdoin was born on January 15, 1904 in Coffee Springs, Alabama. He attended Elba High School in Alabama. While at Elba, he played football and became an all-state player. He then went to the University of Alabama for his university education. He played for the Alabama Crimson Tide football team from the 1924 to 1927 season. He was on the starting roster in the 1926 season and lettered in 1927. While he was playing for the Crimson Tide, they won the college football season in the 1925 and 1926 seasons. In the 1927 Rose Bowl, he came on as a substitute and won the game for his team after blocking a punt that would have won the game for the opposing team, the Stanford Cardinal. He played as a halfback and a fullback for the university.

== Professional career ==
Bowdoin was signed to the Green Bay Packers in the 1928 season, and won three NFL championships until he left the team in the 1931 season on August 1, 1931. While playing for the team, he worked for a road construction company along with teammates Claude Perry and Johnny Blood. In the 1928 season the team achieved a record of 6-4-3 and came fourth in the league. The next season, they had a 12-0-1 and won the league. The 1930 season, saw the team get a 10-3-1 record and win again. In his final year with the team, 1931, the team's record was 12-2-0 and they won again. He was bought by the Brooklyn Dodgers in 1932 from the Packers after a deal between the Packer's coach Curly Lambeau and Dodgers manager Benny Friedman. He was appointed assistant coach during his time there. He was released the same year. He was then signed by the New York Giants on November 2, 1932, one day after being released by the Dodgers. He then played for the Portsmouth Spartans in the 1933 season. He left after that and then signed with the Dodgers again for the 1934 season. He then retired later that season. During his professional career, he was 6 feet 1 inch tall and weighed 227 pounds. He played as a guard.

== Personal life ==
Bowdoin's nickname was Goofy. He was married to Louise Akard and had a daughter named La-Vonda, who was born in May 1960. After graduating from Alabama in June 1957, he went back to his old high school, Elba, to work as a coach until 1958. He later became the track and backfield coach for the Tennessee High Vikings, from the autumn of 1958 until his resignation on June 28, 1960. He was also a health teacher at the school. He resigned to pursue a career in his father-in-law's funeral home. He died on May 11, 1969, in Mobile, Alabama, aged 65.
