= Bears–Lions rivalry =

National Football League rivalry

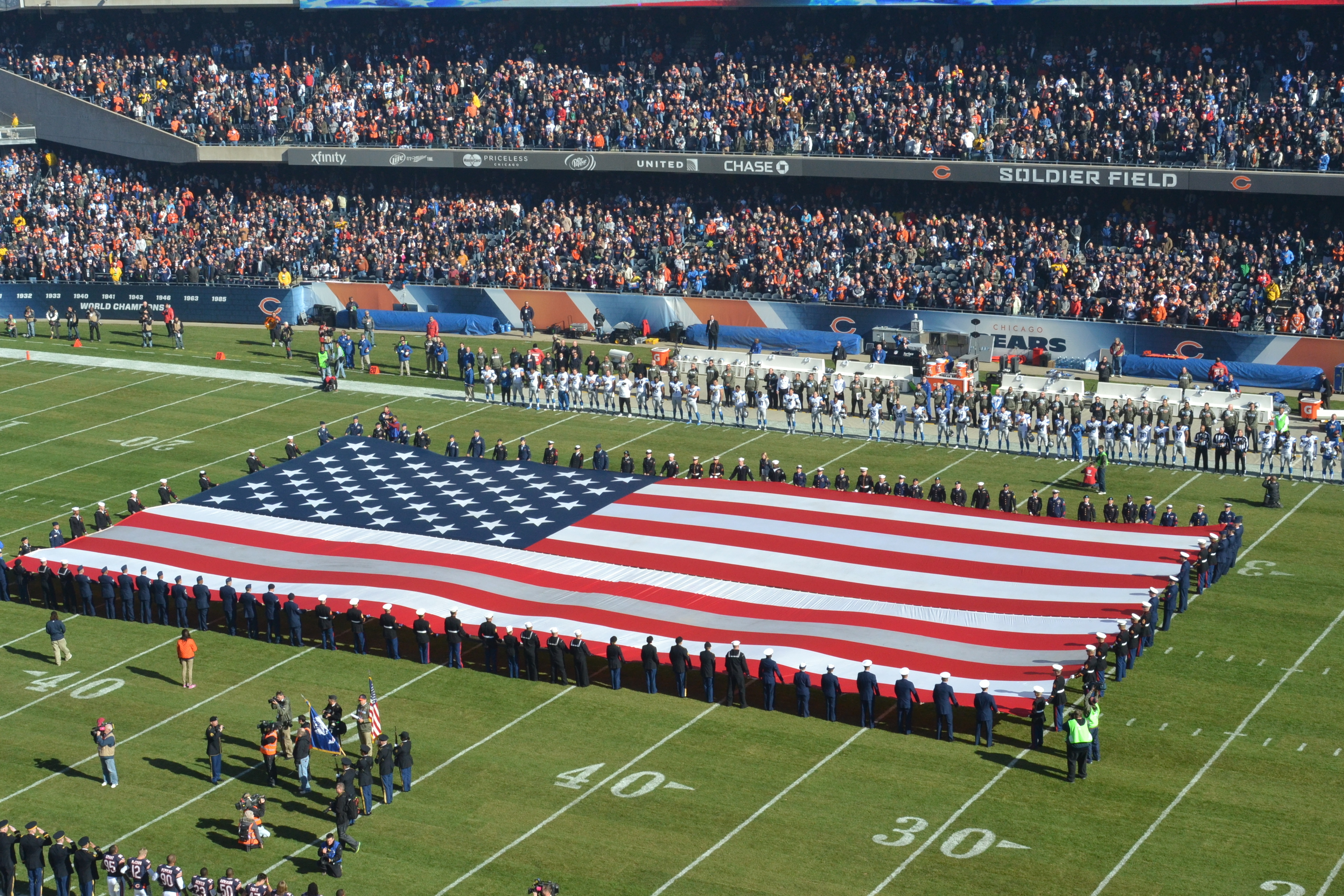
- Pre-game ceremonies ahead of Bears and Lions' 2013 meeting in Chicago.

- Chicago Bears Detroit Lions
- Location: Chicago, Detroit
- First meeting: October 22, 1930; Spartans 7, Bears 6
- Latest meeting: January 4, 2026; Lions 19, Bears 16
- Next meeting: November 26, 2026
- Stadiums: Bears: Soldier Field; Lions: Ford Field

Statistics
- Total meetings: 192
- All-time series: Bears: 105–82–5
- Largest victory: Bears: 49–0 (1941); Lions: 42–0 (1968)
- Most points scored: Bears: 49 (1941); Lions: 55 (1997)
- Longest win streak: Bears: 11 (1946–1951); Lions: 6 (1968–1970, 2013–2015)
- Current win streak: Lions: 4 (2024–present)
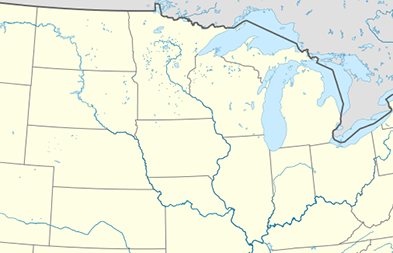

The Bears–Lions rivalry is a National Football League (NFL) rivalry between the Chicago Bears and Detroit Lions.

The franchises first met in 1930 when the Lions were known as the Portsmouth Spartans and based in Portsmouth, Ohio. They moved to Detroit for the 1934 season. The Bears and Lions have been rivals within their division since 1933, facing each other twice each season since the inception of the Lions franchise, except the 1987 season. The two teams play in the two largest metropolitan areas in the Midwest. Chicago and Detroit's home stadiums, Soldier Field and Ford Field, are 280 miles apart and both are easily accessible from I-94. This rivalry is the longest-running annual series in the NFL as both teams have met at least once a season since 1930. (Note: Due to the 1982 strike, the Bears–Packers rivalry, which began in 1921, was not played that season.)

The Bears dominated the rivalry in the early days from the 1930s to the 1950s, when they were a perennial powerhouse team under head coach George "Papa Bear" Halas. Through the 1965 season, the final season before the first Super Bowl was played, Chicago was 47–22–4 against Detroit. However, the series has been far more even since then, with Detroit holding a 60–58–1 lead since then. This is despite the fact the Bears have been far more successful than the Lions since that season, reaching the NFC Divisional Playoffs twelve times (winning five of those playoff games, two NFC titles, and a Super Bowl). In comparison, the Lions have only reached the Divisional Playoffs five times, winning two of those games, and have not won an NFC title.

The Bears lead the overall series, 105–82–5. The two teams have not met in the playoffs. The 1932 NFL Playoff Game, despite its name, is included in the final standings of the regular season.

== Notable rivalry moments ==
- December 18, 1932, 1932 NFL Playoff Game

- The 1932 regular season ended with the Spartans (6–1–4) and Bears (6–1–6) tied atop the NFL standings (at the time, ties were not considered in a team's win percentage). There were no playoffs at the time and the champion was simply the team with the better win percentage with head-to-head results serving as the only tiebreaker. As both teams had the same record and they tied both of their meetings during the season, the NFL staged its first ever playoff game. The teams were set to meet at Wrigley Field, but the game was instead moved to the indoor Chicago Stadium due to severe weather, and modified rules were used because the stadium was smaller than regulation size. The Bears won the game, 9–0, to claim the NFL title. The championship game proved to be popular, so the league split into two divisions beginning in 1933 and staged a championship game between the two division winners at the end of the season. To date, this is the two teams' only playoff meeting (although the game officially counted in the regular season standings).

- November 29, 1934

- The Lions, having just moved to Detroit, decided to schedule an annual game on Thanksgiving in an attempt to draw fans. This idea proved to work as the game was played in front of a sellout crowd. The Bears entered the game with a perfect 11–0 record, while the Lions were 10–1. The Lions built a 16–7 lead at halftime, but the Bears would score 12 unanswered points in the second half to come away with the 19–16 to clinch the NFL Western Division title. The Bears and Lions have met a total of 20 times on Thanksgiving, all in Detroit, with the Bears holding a 11–9 record in the Thanksgiving meetings.

- December 16, 1956

- With the Western Division on the line at Wrigley Field, the Lions jumped out to a 7-3 lead in the 2nd quarter (Thanks to Bill Bowman's 18 yard reception from backup quarterback, Harry Gilmer), following Bobby Layne's game ending injury. Then, the Bears scored 14 unanswered points (Rick Casares' 68 yard and J.C. Caroline's 9 yard rushing touchdowns) to put themselves up 17-7. With Leon Hart's 1 yard touchdown, the Lions would cut that lead, to 3. This was the closest they would ever get, as the Bears would tack on three more touchdowns (Harlon Hill's 44 yard reception, Bobby Watkins's 7 yard rush, and Joe Fortunato's 27 yard interception return). Although the Lions responded with a touchdown of their own in the 4th quarter (Dorne Dibble's 9 yard reception), the hole was too big for them to climb out of, as the Bears clinched the title. They would go on to lose in the 1956 NFL Championship Game.

- October 24, 1971

- Lions wide receiver Chuck Hughes collapsed on the field and was rushed to the hospital, where he was pronounced dead. He remains the only player in NFL history to have died on the field.

- November 27, 1980

- The Bears come back from 14 points down in the fourth quarter to force overtime. Bears running back Dave Williams returned the opening kickoff of overtime 95 yards for a touchdown as the Bears left Detroit with a stunning 23–17 win. At the time, it was the shortest overtime in NFL history.

- November 22, 1987

- The Bears beat the Lions 30-10 in the teams only meeting that year, as the game in Detroit was cancelled during the NFL players strike. To date, this is the only season in which the Lions and Bears have not met twice in a season. Highlights of this game were later shown during the Max Headroom signal hijacking that took place across the city of Chicago that night.

- December 24, 2000

- The Lions entered Week 17 needing one final win over a last-place Bears team to clinch a playoff spot. Despite building a 10–0 lead in the first quarter, the Lions found themselves trailing 20–17 in the fourth. The Lions tied the game at 20 with under two minutes to go, but the Bears' rookie kicker Paul Edinger secured the win for Chicago with a 54-yard field goal with two seconds left, all but eliminating the Lions from playoff contention. This proved to be a franchise-altering moment for Detroit, who hired Matt Millen in the offseason to rebuild the team.

- September 30, 2007

- It was a defensive slugfest for the first three quarters, with the score 13-3 in favor of Chicago. However, starting with a Shaun McDonald touchdown pass for Detroit in the early moments of the fourth quarter, the Lions' offense caught fire, scoring an additional 27 points in the fourth quarter, while still allowing two Bears touchdowns, to stun the Bears 37-27. The fourth quarter saw an NFL-record 48-points scored.

- September 12, 2010

- Lions wide receiver Calvin Johnson appeared to catch a touchdown pass late in the game that would have given the Lions the lead, but it was controversially ruled to not be a catch after Johnson was ruled to not have completed the process of catching the ball. Johnson had the ball in both hands, got both feet down, rolled over on his backside and put his hand with the ball in it on the ground. The call was reviewed on the instant replay review, but the "no catch" ruling was upheld. The rule for what defines a catch was updated in 2015, with this play (along with other similar plays) being a large reason for the change.

- September 13, 2020

- In both teams' first game of the season, the Lions led the Bears 23–6 in the fourth quarter. The Bears rallied back scoring 21 unanswered points and took a 27–23 lead with 1:54 left in the game. The Lions, however, still had a chance to win. Lions quarterback Matthew Stafford drove his team from their own 25 yard line all the way to the Bears' 16 yard line with 11 seconds left. The Lions attempted to go to the endzone but Stafford's pass was dropped in the endzone by Lions rookie running back D'Andre Swift which would've won the game for the Lions. On the next and last play of the game, Stafford's pass to the endzone was broken up by Bears rookie cornerback Jaylon Johnson to seal the Bears' 27–23 come-from-behind victory.

- November 19, 2023

- The Bears were beating the Lions 26–14 with around 3 minutes left in the game when the Lions scored on a touchdown catch from Jameson Williams to cut the lead to 26–21. The Bears went three-and-out on their next possession that lasted only 15 seconds before they punted it back to the Lions. The Lions drove down the field from their own 27 yard line and would score a go-ahead touchdown with only 29 seconds left in the game on a 1-yard run by former Bears running back David Montgomery to take a one point lead. The Lions went for two points and succeeded to take a three point lead with 29 seconds left. The Bears started on their own 25 yard line with 29 seconds left and was hoping to get to field goal range and potentially tie the game. But on the first snap, Lions defensive end Aidan Hutchinson sacked Bears quarterback Justin Fields that caused Fields to fumble before the ball was kicked out of the endzone by Bears tackle Darnell Wright for a safety and preserve the Lions comeback win 31–26.

- November 28, 2024

- In this edition of the Thanksgiving Day game at Ford Field, the Lions jumped out to a 23–7 lead and appeared to be cruising to victory. However, the Bears managed to cut the lead to 23–20 and were driving in the fourth quarter to tie the game or even pull off the upset. That bid would fall short in the final minute of regulation when Chicago rookie quarterback Caleb Williams was sacked and the Bears did not use their remaining timeout. With the clock running out, Williams threw a desperation pass towards the end zone to Rome Odunze, which fell incomplete. As a result, Detroit won their first Thanksgiving game since 2016. Meanwhile, it was the Bears' sixth consecutive loss, prompting management to fire Matt Eberflus the next day. It was the first time a head coach had been released during the season in franchise history.

== Season-by-season results ==
Chicago Bears vs. Portsmouth Spartans/Detroit Lions Season-by-Season Results
1930s (Bears, 11–7–3)

Season	Season series	at Chicago Bears	at Portsmouth Spartans/Detroit Lions	Overall series	Notes
1930	Tie 1–1	Bears; 14–6	Spartans; 7–6	Tie; 1–1	Portsmouth Spartans join the National Football League (NFL) as an expansion team. Spartans won their first meeting against the Bears to take their only overall series lead in the rivalry.
1931	Tie 1–1	Bears; 9–6	Spartans; 3–0	Tie; 2–2	
1932	Bears 1–0–2	Tie; 13–13	Tie; 7–7	Bears; 3–2–2	Both teams finished with 6 wins and 1 loss and split the season series, setting up a tiebreaker game. The 1932 NFL Playoff Game was moved indoors to Chicago Stadium due to bad weather and saw the Bears winning 9–0 to be named NFL Champions. Despite its name, the game was officially included in the final standings, leading to the Bears finishing with a 7–1–6 record and the Spartans finishing with a 6–2–4 record, behind the second-place Green Bay Packers. The success and popularity of the game led to future NFL playoff games.
1932	Bears 1–0–2	Bears; 9–0	Tie; 7–7	Bears; 3–2–2	
1933	Bears 2–0	Bears; 17–14	Bears; 17–7	Bears; 5–2–2	Due to the popularity and success of the 1932 NFL Playoff Game, the league divided its teams into two divisions, with the Bears and Spartans placed in the NFL Western Division, becoming divisional rivals. Last season Spartans played as a Portsmouth-based team and under the name "Spartans". Bears win 1933 NFL Championship.
1934	Bears 2–0	Bears; 10–7	Bears; 19–16	Bears; 7–2–2	Spartans relocate to Detroit and rename themselves to the Detroit Lions. Game in Detroit marked the Lions' inaugural annual Thanksgiving home game. In Detroit, Bears win the NFL Western Division title with their win. With their win in Chicago, Bears become the first team to go unbeaten and untied in the NFL's regular season. Bears lose 1934 NFL Championship.
1935	Lions 1–0–1	Tie; 20–20	Lions; 14–2	Bears; 7–3–3	Game in Detroit was played on Thanksgiving. Lions win 1935 NFL Championship.
1936	Tie 1–1	Bears; 12–10	Lions; 13–7	Bears; 8–4–3	Game in Detroit was played on Thanksgiving.
1937	Bears 2–0	Bears; 28–20	Bears; 13–0	Bears; 10–4–3	Game in Detroit was played on Thanksgiving. Bears lose 1937 NFL Championship.
1938	Lions 2–0	Lions; 13–7	Lions; 14–7	Bears; 10–6–3	Game in Detroit was played on Thanksgiving.
1939	Tie 1–1	Lions; 10–0	Bears; 23–13	Bears; 11–7–3	

1940s (Bears, 15–4–1)

Season	Season series	at Chicago Bears	at Detroit Lions	Overall series	Notes
1940	Tie 1–1	Bears; 7–0	Lions; 17–14	Bears; 12–8–3	Bears win 1940 NFL Championship.
1941	Bears 2–0	Bears; 49–0	Bears; 24–7	Bears; 14–8–3	Lions move to Tiger Stadium. In Chicago, Bears record their largest victory against the Lions with a 49–point differential, score their most points in a game against the Lions, and set a franchise record for their largest victory overall (broken in 1943). Bears win 1941 NFL Championship.
1942	Bears 2–0	Bears; 16–0	Bears; 42–0	Bears; 16–8–3	Bears lose 1942 NFL Championship.
1943	Bears 2–0	Bears; 35–14	Bears; 27–21	Bears; 18–8–3	Bears win 1943 NFL Championship.
1944	Lions 1–0–1	Tie; 21–21	Lions; 41–21	Bears; 18–9–4	The tie result snapped the Bears' 17-game home winning streak.
1945	Lions 2–0	Lions; 35–28	Lions; 16–10	Bears; 18–11–4	
1946	Bears 2–0	Bears; 42–6	Bears; 45–24	Bears; 20–11–4	Bears win 1946 NFL Championship.
1947	Bears 2–0	Bears; 33–24	Bears; 34–14	Bears; 22–11–4	Game in Detroit was played on Thanksgiving.
1948	Bears 2–0	Bears; 28–0	Bears; 42–14	Bears; 24–11–4	
1949	Bears 2–0	Bears; 27–24	Bears; 28–7	Bears; 26–11–4	Game in Detroit was played on Thanksgiving.

1950s (Bears, 13–7)

Season	Season series	at Chicago Bears	at Detroit Lions	Overall series	Notes
1950	Bears 2–0	Bears; 6–3	Bears; 35–21	Bears; 28–11–4	As a result of the AAFC–NFL merger, the Bears and Lions were placed in the NFL National Conference (later renamed to the NFL Western Conference in the 1953 season).
1951	Tie 1–1	Lions; 41–28	Bears; 28–23	Bears; 29–12–4	Bears win 11 straight meetings (1946–1951).
1952	Tie 1–1	Bears; 24–23	Lions; 45–21	Bears; 30–13–4	Lions win 1952 NFL Championship.
1953	Lions 2–0	Lions; 20–16	Lions; 13–7	Bears; 30–15–4	Lions win 1953 NFL Championship.
1954	Tie 1–1	Bears; 28–24	Lions; 48–23	Bears; 31–16–4	Lions lose 1954 NFL Championship.
1955	Bears 2–0	Bears; 21–20	Bears; 24–14	Bears; 33–16–4	
1956	Tie 1–1	Bears; 38–21	Lions; 42–10	Bears; 34–17–4	Bears lose 1956 NFL Championship.
1957	Tie 1–1	Lions; 21–13	Bears; 27–7	Bears; 35–18–4	Bears' win is the Lions only home loss in the 1957 season. Lions win 1957 NFL Championship.
1958	Bears 2–0	Bears; 21–16	Bears; 20–7	Bears; 37–18–4	
1959	Bears 2–0	Bears; 25–14	Bears; 24–14	Bears; 39–18–4	

1960s (Bears, 10–9–1)

Season	Season series	at Chicago Bears	at Detroit Lions	Overall series	Notes
1960	Tie 1–1	Bears; 28–7	Lions; 36–0	Bears; 40–19–4	
1961	Tie 1–1	Lions; 16–15	Bears; 31–17	Bears; 41–20–4	
1962	Tie 1–1	Bears; 3–0	Lions; 11–3	Bears; 42–21–4	
1963	Bears 2–0	Bears; 24–14	Bears; 37–21	Bears; 44–21–4	Bears win 1963 NFL Championship.
1964	Tie 1–1	Lions; 10–0	Bears; 27–24	Bears; 45–22–4	Game in Detroit was played on Thanksgiving.
1965	Bears 2–0	Bears; 38–10	Bears; 17–10	Bears; 47–22–4	
1966	Lions 1–0–1	Tie; 10–10	Lions; 14–3	Bears; 47–23–5	
1967	Bears 2–0	Bears; 14–3	Bears; 27–13	Bears; 49–23–5	As a result of expansion, the two eight-team divisions became two eight-team conferences split into two divisions, with the Bears and Lions placed in the NFL Central division.
1968	Lions 2–0	Lions; 28–10	Lions; 42–0	Bears; 49–25–5	In Detroit, Lions set a franchise record for their largest victory overall (broken in 1983) and record their largest victory against the Bears with a 42–point differential. Lions first season series sweep against the Bears since the 1953 season.
1969	Lions 2–0	Lions; 20–3	Lions; 13–7	Bears; 49–27–5	

1970s (Lions, 12–8)

Season	Season series	at Chicago Bears	at Detroit Lions	Overall series	Notes
1970	Lions 2–0	Lions; 16–10	Lions; 28–14	Bears; 49–29–5	As a result of the AFL–NFL merger, the Bears and Lions were placed in the National Football Conference (NFC) and the NFC Central (later renamed to the NFC North in the 2002 season).
1971	Tie 1–1	Lions; 28–3	Bears; 28–23	Bears; 50-30–5	Bears open Soldier Field.
1972	Lions 2–0	Lions; 38–24	Lions; 14–0	Bears; 50–32–5	
1973	Lions 2–0	Lions; 30–7	Lions; 40–7	Bears; 50–34–5	
1974	Tie 1–1	Bears; 17–9	Lions; 34–17	Bears; 51–35–5	
1975	Tie 1–1	Bears; 25–21	Lions; 27–7	Bears; 52–36–5	Lions open Pontiac Silverdome.
1976	Tie 1–1	Bears; 10–3	Lions; 14–10	Bears; 53–37–5	
1977	Bears 2–0	Bears; 30–20	Bears; 31–14	Bears; 55–37–5	Game in Detroit was played on Thanksgiving.
1978	Tie 1–1	Lions; 21–17	Bears; 19–0	Bears; 56–38–5	
1979	Tie 1–1	Bears; 35–7	Lions; 20–0	Bears; 57–39–5	Game in Detroit was played on Thanksgiving .

1980s (Bears, 13–6)

Season	Season series	at Chicago Bears	at Detroit Lions	Overall series	Notes
1980	Bears 2–0	Bears; 24–7	Bears; 23–17 (OT)	Bears; 59–39–5	Game in Detroit was played on Thanksgiving, which saw the Bears overcome a 17–3 fourth quarter deficit and ended with Bears' RB Dave Williams returning the opening kickoff in overtime 95 yards for the game-winning touchdown.
1981	Lions 2–0	Lions; 23–7	Lions; 48–17	Bears; 59–41–5	
1982	Tie 1–1	Bears; 20–17	Lions; 17–10	Bears; 60–42–5	Both games were played despite 1982 NFL players' strike reducing the season to 9 games.
1983	Lions 2–0	Lions; 38–17	Lions; 31–17	Bears; 60–44–5	
1984	Bears 2–0	Bears; 16–14	Bears; 30–13	Bears; 62–44–5	
1985	Bears 2–0	Bears; 24–3	Bears; 37–17	Bears; 64–44–5	Bears win Super Bowl XX.
1986	Bears 2–0	Bears; 13–7	Bears; 16–13	Bears; 66–44–5	
1987	Bears 1–0	Bears; 30–10	canceled	Bears; 67–44–5	Due to the 1987 NFL Players' strike, the game scheduled in Detroit was canceled. Highlights of the game in Chicago were shown during the Max Headroom broadcast intrusion.
1988	Bears 2–0	Bears; 13–12	Bears; 24–7	Bears; 69–44–5	
1989	Tie 1–1	Lions; 27–17	Bears; 47–27	Bears; 70–45–5	Bears win 10 straight meetings (1984–1989).

1990s (Lions, 12–8)

Season	Season series	at Chicago Bears	at Detroit Lions	Overall series	Notes
1990	Tie 1–1	Bears; 23–17 (OT)	Lions; 38–21	Bears; 71–46–5	
1991	Tie 1–1	Bears; 20–10	Lions; 16–6	Bears; 72–47–5	Game in Detroit was played on Thanksgiving.
1992	Tie 1–1	Bears; 27–24	Lions; 16–3	Bears; 73–48–5	
1993	Tie 1–1	Lions; 20–14	Bears; 10–6	Bears; 74–49–5	Game in Detroit was played on Thanksgiving.
1994	Tie 1–1	Bears; 20–10	Lions; 21–16	Bears; 75–50–5	Both teams finished with 9–7 records, but the Lions clinched the better playoff seed based on a better division record.
1995	Lions 2–0	Lions; 24–17	Lions; 27–7	Bears; 75–52–5	Lions' first season series sweep against the Bears since the 1983 season.
1996	Tie 1–1	Bears; 31–14	Lions; 35–16	Bears; 76–53–5	
1997	Lions 2–0	Lions; 32–7	Lions; 55–20	Bears; 76–55–5	Game in Detroit was played on Thanksgiving, ending with the Lions setting a franchise record for their most points scored in the regular season.
1998	Tie 1–1	Bears; 31–27	Lions; 26–3	Bears; 77–56–5	In Chicago, Bears overcame a 27–10 fourth quarter deficit.
1999	Tie 1–1	Bears; 28–10	Lions; 21–17	Bears; 78–57–5	Game in Detroit was played on Thanksgiving.

2000s (Bears, 13–7)

Season	Season series	at Chicago Bears	at Detroit Lions	Overall series	Notes
2000	Tie 1–1	Lions; 21–14	Bears; 23–20	Bears; 79–58–5	Bears' win, coupled with the Rams' win against the Saints, eliminated the Lions from playoff contention.
2001	Bears 2–0	Bears; 13–0	Bears; 24–0	Bears; 81–58–5	Bears' first season series sweep against the Lions since the 1988 season.
2002	Tie 1–1	Bears; 20–17 (OT)	Lions; 23–20 (OT)	Bears; 82–59–5	Lions open Ford Field. Due to renovations being made to Soldier Field, Bears' home game was played at Memorial Stadium in Champaign. In Chicago, Lions won the coin toss in overtime but chose to take the wind instead of opting for possession, resulting in the Bears scoring and winning and the Lions never getting possession back.
2003	Tie 1–1	Bears; 24–16	Lions; 12–10	Bears; 83–60–5	
2004	Lions 2–0	Lions; 20–16	Lions; 19–13	Bears; 83–62–5	With their win in Chicago, the Lions snapped their 24-game road game losing streak, an NFL record (broken by the 2010 Lions).
2005	Bears 2–0	Bears; 38–6	Bears; 19–13 (OT)	Bears; 85–62–5	
2006	Bears 2–0	Bears; 34–7	Bears; 26–21	Bears; 87–62–5	Bears lose Super Bowl XLI.
2007	Lions 2–0	Lions; 16–7	Lions; 37–27	Bears; 87–64–5	In Detroit, Bears led 13–3 at the end of the third quarter before both teams exploded for a combined 48 points in the fourth quarter, setting an NFL record for most points scored in the fourth quarter. Following their win in Chicago, the Lions went on a 26-game road losing streak, an NFL record, and a 19-game division losing streak.
2008	Bears 2–0	Bears; 27–23	Bears; 34–7	Bears; 89–64–5	Lions complete first 0–16 season in NFL history.
2009	Bears 2–0	Bears; 48–24	Bears; 37–23	Bears; 91–64–5	

2010s (Tie, 10–10)

Season	Season series	at Chicago Bears	at Detroit Lions	Overall series	Notes
2010	Bears 2–0	Bears; 19–14	Bears; 24–20	Bears; 93–64–5	In Chicago, Lions WR Calvin Johnson appears to catch a game-winning touchdown, but it is controversially ruled a no-catch.
2011	Tie 1–1	Bears; 37–13	Lions; 24–13	Bears; 94–65–5	
2012	Bears 2–0	Bears; 13–7	Bears; 26–24	Bears; 96–65–5	
2013	Lions 2–0	Lions; 21–19	Lions; 40–32	Bears; 96–67–5	
2014	Lions 2–0	Lions; 20–14	Lions; 34–17	Bears; 96–69–5	Game in Detroit was played on Thanksgiving.
2015	Lions 2–0	Lions; 24–20	Lions; 37–34 (OT)	Bears; 96–71–5	
2016	Tie 1–1	Bears; 17–14	Lions; 20–17	Bears; 97–72–5	
2017	Lions 2–0	Lions; 27–24	Lions; 20–10	Bears; 97–74–5	
2018	Bears 2–0	Bears; 34–22	Bears; 23–16	Bears; 99–74–5	In Chicago, Bears' placekicker Cody Parkey hits the upright four times (two FG attempts, two XP attempts). Game in Detroit was played on Thanksgiving.
2019	Bears 2–0	Bears; 20–13	Bears; 24–20	Bears; 101–74–5	Bears record their 100th win in the rivalry, becoming the third team to record 100 wins over a single opponent. Meanwhile, the Lions became the first team to record 100 losses to two different opponents. Game in Detroit was played on Thanksgiving .

2020s (Lions, 8–4)

Season	Season series	at Chicago Bears	at Detroit Lions	Overall series	Notes
2020	Tie 1–1	Lions; 34–30	Bears; 27–23	Bears; 102–75–5	In Detroit, Bears overcame a 23–6 fourth-quarter deficit. In Chicago, Lions overcame a 30–20 fourth-quarter deficit with three minutes left. Road team splits the season series for the first time since the 2000 season.
2021	Bears 2–0	Bears; 24–14	Bears; 16–14	Bears; 104–75–5	Game in Detroit was played on Thanksgiving.
2022	Lions 2–0	Lions; 31–30	Lions; 41–10	Bears; 104–77–5	In Chicago, Lions overcame a 24–10 fourth-quarter deficit and snapped their 13-game road winless streak.
2023	Tie 1–1	Bears; 28–13	Lions; 31–26	Bears; 105–78–5	In Detroit, Lions overcome a 26–14 fourth-quarter deficit in the final 4 minutes.
2024	Lions 2–0	Lions; 34–17	Lions; 23–20	Bears; 105–80–5	Game in Detroit was played on Thanksgiving. Following their loss, Bears fired HC Matt Eberflus, becoming the first Bears' head coach to be fired mid-season. Lions win all of their division games for the first time in franchise history.
2025	Lions 2–0	Lions; 19–16	Lions; 52–21	Bears; 105–82–5	Bears hire Lions offensive coordinator Ben Johnson as their head coach.
2026		January 3	November 26	Bears; 105–82–5	Game in Detroit will be played on Thanksgiving.

Summary of Results

Season	Season series	at Chicago Bears	at Portsmouth Spartans/Detroit Lions	Notes
Regular season	Bears 105–82–5	Bears 61–32–4	Lions 50–44–1	Spartans/Lions have a 2–1–1 record in Portsmouth, Ohio. Bears are 1–0 at Memorial Stadium in Champaign (2002), accounted as a Bears' home game. Despite its name, the 1932 NFL Playoff Game is counted to the regular season standings.

== Notable players that played for both teams ==
Name	Pos.	Years with Bears	Years with Lions
Michael Badgley	K	2022	2022, 2023–2024
Mark Carrier	S	1990–1996	1997–1999
Marcus Cooper	CB	2017–2018	2018
Chase Daniel	QB	2018–2019	2020
Kellen Davis	TE	2008–2012	2014
Rashied Davis	WR	2005–2010	2011
C. J. Gardner-Johnson	S	2025	2023
Chris Harris	S	2005–2006, 2010–2011	2011
Israel Idonije	DE	2004–2012	2013
Bruce Irvin	LB	2021	2023
Jesse James	TE	2021	2019–2020
Kevin Jones	RB	2008	2004–2007
Erik Kramer	QB	1994–1998	1991–1993
Dave Krieg	QB	1996	1994
Greg Landry	QB	1984	1968–1978
Bobby Layne	QB	1948	1950–1958
R. W. McQuarters	CB	2000–2004	2005
Josh McCown	QB	2011–2013	2006
Glyn Milburn	RB	1998–2001	1996–1997
D'Andre Swift	RB	2024–present	2020–2022
David Montgomery	RB	2019–2022	2023–2025
Jon Morris	C	1978	1975–1977
Alonzo Spellman	DL	1992–1997	2001
Nathan Vasher	CB	2004–2009	2010
Kindle Vildor	CB	2020–2022	2023–2024
Dave Whitsell	CB	1961–1966	1958–1960
Roy Williams	WR	2011	2004–2008
Willie Young	DE	2014–2017	2010–2013

== See also ==
- List of NFL rivalries
- NFC North
- Bulls–Pistons rivalry
- Blackhawks–Red Wings rivalry
- Illinois–Michigan football rivalry
- Michigan–Northwestern football rivalry
