= 1932 Brooklyn Dodgers (NFL) season =

National Football League team season

1932 Brooklyn Dodgers season
- Owner: Bill Dwyer
- Head coach: Benny Friedman
- Home stadium: Ebbets Field

Results
- Record: 3–9
- Division place: 6th NFL
- Playoffs: Did not qualify

The 1932 Brooklyn Dodgers season was their third in the league. They improved on their previous season's output of 2–12, winning three games and failing to qualify for the playoffs.

== Schedule ==
Game	Date	Opponent	Result	Record	Venue	Recap
1	September 25	at Staten Island Stapletons	W 7–0	1–0	Thompson Stadium	Recap
2	October 2	at Boston Braves	W 14–0	2–0	Braves Field	Recap
3	October 9	Staten Island Stapletons	L 6–7	2–1	Ebbets Field	Recap
4	October 16	at New York Giants	L 12–20	2–2	Polo Grounds	Recap
5	October 23	at Green Bay Packers	L 0–13	2–3	City Stadium	Recap
6	October 30	at Chicago Cardinals	L 7–27	2–4	Wrigley Field	Recap
7	November 6	Portsmouth Spartans	L 7–17	2–5	Ebbets Field	Recap
8	November 13	Chicago Cardinals	W 3–0	3–5	Ebbets Field	Recap
9	November 20	at Chicago Bears	L 0–20	3–6	Wrigley Field	Recap
10	November 24	Green Bay Packers	L 0–7	3–7	Ebbets Field	Recap
11	November 27	New York Giants	L 7–13	3–8	Ebbets Field	Recap
12	December 4	Boston Braves	L 0–7	3–9	Ebbets Field	Recap

== Roster ==
1932 Brooklyn Dodgers final roster
Backs: 1 Benny Friedman RB/S/K; 5 Jack Grossman RB/CB/S; 4 Bull Karcis FB/LB; 6 Ray Novotny RB/CB/S; 8 Ollie Sansen RB/CB/S; 21 Stumpy Thomason RB/CB; Ends/Receivers: 3 Frank McNeil; 33 Bill Raffel; 19 Paul Riblett; 17 Ev Rowan	Linemen: 14 John Ambrose C/MG; 8 Les Caywood G/DG; 16 Harold Ely T/DT; 20 Donn Greenshields T/DT; 22 Herman Hickman G/DG; 23 Bruce Jones G/DG; 11 Lou Lubratovich T/DT; 12 Babe Lyon T/DT; 10 Saul Mielziner C/MG; 18 Stu Worden G/DG; Rookies in italics

== Standings ==
NFL standings
	W	L	T	PCT	PF	PA	STK
Chicago Bears ^{1}	7	1	6	.875	160	44	W3
Green Bay Packers	10	3	1	.769	152	63	L2
Portsmouth Spartans ^{1}	6	2	4	.750	116	71	L1
Boston Braves	4	4	2	.500	55	79	W2
New York Giants	4	6	2	.400	93	113	L1
Brooklyn Dodgers	3	9	0	.250	63	131	L4
Chicago Cardinals	2	6	2	.250	72	114	L5
Staten Island Stapletons	2	7	3	.222	77	173	L1

Note: Tie games were not officially counted in the standings until 1972.

^{1} The Bears and Spartans records include the result of the 1932 NFL Playoff Game; thus, the Spartans are ranked third behind the Packers.
