= 1932 Portsmouth Spartans season =

NFL team season

- Owner: Portsmouth National League Football Corporation
- General manager: Harry N. Snyder
- Head coach: Potsy Clark
- Home stadium: Universal Stadium

Results
- Record: 6–2–4
- League place: 3rd NFL
- Playoffs: Lost NFL Championship (at Bears) 0–9

"Seventeen Iron Men" of the 1932 Spartans team.

In 1932, the Portsmouth Spartans appeared in the league championship game, the first playoff game in NFL history, losing to the Chicago Bears 9–0. With a record of 6–1–4 in 1932, the Spartans finished in a tie for the NFL title with the Chicago Bears. It was the first time in history that the season ended with two teams atop the league's standings. (Ties were omitted in calculating winning percentage.) Both games during the season between Portsmouth and Chicago had ended in ties; to determine a sole champion, the league office arranged for the first playoff game in NFL history.

The game was originally scheduled to be played at Wrigley Field, the Bears' home stadium. Due to severe blizzards and sub-zero wind chill throughout the week, the game was moved indoors to Chicago Stadium. The arena allowed only an 80-yard field (end lines) that came right to the walls, and the goal posts were moved from the end lines to the goal. The Bears won 9–0, scoring the winning touchdown on a two-yard pass from Bronko Nagurski to Red Grange in the fourth quarter. Attendance for the game was 11,198.

With the loss, Portsmouth dropped to third in the final league standings, behind the runner-up Green Bay Packers (10–3–1).

== Season ==
=== Schedule ===
Week	Date	Opponent	Result	Record	Venue	Recap
1	September 25	New York Giants	W 7–0	1–0	Universal Stadium	Recap
2	October 2	Chicago Cardinals	T 7–7	1–0–1	Universal Stadium	Recap
3	October 9	at Green Bay Packers	L 10–15	1–1–1	City Stadium	Recap
4	October 16	at Staten Island Stapletons	T 7–7	1–1–2	Thompson Stadium	Recap
5	October 20	at Staten Island Stapletons	W 13–6	2–1–2	Thompson Stadium	Recap
6	October 30	at New York Giants	W 6–0	3–1–2	Polo Grounds	Recap
7	November 6	at Brooklyn Dodgers	W 17–7	4–1–2	Ebbets Field	Recap
8	November 13	at Chicago Bears	T 13–13	4–1–3	Wrigley Field	Recap
9	November 20	Boston Braves	W 10–0	5–1–3	Universal Stadium	Recap
10	November 27	Chicago Bears	T 7–7	5–1–4	Universal Stadium	Recap
11	December 4	Green Bay Packers	W 19–0	6–1–4	Universal Stadium	Recap
Playoff	December 18	at Chicago Bears	L 0–9	6–2–4	Chicago Stadium	Recap

== Standings ==
NFL standings
	W	L	T	PCT	PF	PA	STK
Chicago Bears ^{1}	7	1	6	.875	160	44	W3
Green Bay Packers	10	3	1	.769	152	63	L2
Portsmouth Spartans ^{1}	6	2	4	.750	116	71	L1
Boston Braves	4	4	2	.500	55	79	W2
New York Giants	4	6	2	.400	93	113	L1
Brooklyn Dodgers	3	9	0	.250	63	131	L4
Chicago Cardinals	2	6	2	.250	72	114	L5
Staten Island Stapletons	2	7	3	.222	77	173	L1

Note: Tie games were not officially counted in the standings until 1972.

^{1} The Bears and Spartans records include the result of the 1932 NFL Playoff Game; thus, the Spartans are ranked third behind the Packers.

== Roster ==
1932 Portsmouth Spartans final roster
Backs: 25 Gene Alford RB/CB/S; 6 John Cavosie FB/LB; 5 Ace Gutowsky FB/LB; 2 Father Lumpkin RB/CB; 20 Glenn Presnell RB/CB/S/K; 8 Mule Wilson RB/CB; Ends: 30 Harry Ebding; 10 Bill McKalip	Linemen: 33 Bob Armstrong T/DT; 16 Maury Bodenger G/DG; 27 George Christensen T/DT; 17 Ray Davis C/T/MG/DT; 7 Ox Emerson G/DG; 24 Buster Mitchell T/DT; 4 Clare Randolph C/MG; 31 Am Rascher G/DG; 9 John Wager C/G/MG; Reserve: 12 Dutch Clark RB/CB/S/K; rookies in italics

== Playoff Game ==
Chicago Bears 9, Portsmouth Spartans 0
