= 1932 Chicago Cardinals season =

American football team season

- Owner: Dr. David J. Jones
- Head coach: Jack Chevigny
- Home stadium: Wrigley Field

Results
- Record: 2–6–2
- League place: 7th place NFL
- Playoffs: None Scheduled

The 1932 Chicago Cardinals season was their 13th season in the league. The team failed to improve on their previous year's 5–4 record, winning only two games. This was the last NFL season without a scheduled postseason or divisions.

This was the last season of ownership for Dr. David J. Jones, who sold the team to attorney Charles Bidwill for $50,000.

== Schedule ==
Game	Date	Opponent	Result	Record	Venue	Recap
1	September 18	at Green Bay Packers	L 7–15	0–1–0	City Stadium	Recap
2	October 2	at Portsmouth Spartans	T 7–7	0–1–1	Universal Stadium	Recap
3	October 9	Chicago Bears	T 0–0	0–1–2	Wrigley Field	Recap
4	October 16	at Boston Braves	W 9–0	1–1–2	Braves Field	Recap
5	October 30	Brooklyn Dodgers	W 27–7	2–1–2	Wrigley Field	Recap
6	November 6	Green Bay Packers	L 9–19	2–2–2	Wrigley Field	Recap
7	November 13	at Brooklyn Dodgers	L 0–3	2–3–2	Ebbets Field	Recap
8	November 20	at Staten Island Stapletons	L 7–21	2–4–2	Thompson Stadium	Recap
9	November 24	at Chicago Bears	L 0–34	2–5–2	Wrigley Field	Recap
10	November 27	Boston Braves	L 6–8	2–6–2	Wrigley Field	Recap

== Standings ==
NFL standings
	W	L	T	PCT	PF	PA	STK
Chicago Bears ^{1}	7	1	6	.875	160	44	W3
Green Bay Packers	10	3	1	.769	152	63	L2
Portsmouth Spartans ^{1}	6	2	4	.750	116	71	L1
Boston Braves	4	4	2	.500	55	79	W2
New York Giants	4	6	2	.400	93	113	L1
Brooklyn Dodgers	3	9	0	.250	63	131	L4
Chicago Cardinals	2	6	2	.250	72	114	L5
Staten Island Stapletons	2	7	3	.222	77	173	L1

Note: Tie games were not officially counted in the standings until 1972.

^{1} The Bears and Spartans records include the result of the 1932 NFL Playoff Game; thus, the Spartans are ranked third behind the Packers.
