= 1932 Boston Braves (NFL) season =

NFL team season

1932 Boston Braves season
- Owner: George Preston Marshall
- Head coach: Lud Wray
- Home stadium: Braves Field

Results
- Record: 4–4–2
- League place: 4th in NFL
- Playoffs: Did not qualify

The Boston Braves finished their inaugural 1932 season with a record of four wins, four losses, and two ties, and finished in fourth place in the National Football League (NFL). This was the only season the team was not known as the Redskins until 2020.

== Regular season ==
=== Schedule ===
Week	Date	Opponent	Result	Record	Venue	Recap
1	Bye					
2	Bye					
3	October 2	Brooklyn Dodgers	L 0–14	0–1	Braves Field	Recap
4	October 9	New York Giants	W 14–6	1–1	Braves Field	Recap
5	October 16	Chicago Cardinals	L 0–9	1–2	Braves Field	Recap
6	October 23	at New York Giants	T 0–0	1–2–1	Polo Grounds	Recap
7	October 30	Chicago Bears	T 7–7	1–2–2	Braves Field	Recap
8	November 6	Staten Island Stapletons	W 19–6	2–2–2	Braves Field	Recap
9	November 13	Green Bay Packers	L 0–21	2–3–2	Braves Field	Recap
10	November 20	at Portsmouth Spartans	L 0–10	2–4–2	Universal Stadium	Recap
11	November 27	at Chicago Cardinals	W 8–6	3–4–2	Comiskey Park	Recap
12	December 4	at Brooklyn Dodgers	W 7–0	4–4–2	Ebbets Field	Recap

== Standings ==
NFL standings
	W	L	T	PCT	PF	PA	STK
Chicago Bears ^{1}	7	1	6	.875	160	44	W3
Green Bay Packers	10	3	1	.769	152	63	L2
Portsmouth Spartans ^{1}	6	2	4	.750	116	71	L1
Boston Braves	4	4	2	.500	55	79	W2
New York Giants	4	6	2	.400	93	113	L1
Brooklyn Dodgers	3	9	0	.250	63	131	L4
Chicago Cardinals	2	6	2	.250	72	114	L5
Staten Island Stapletons	2	7	3	.222	77	173	L1

Note: Tie games were not officially counted in the standings until 1972.

^{1} The Bears and Spartans records include the result of the 1932 NFL Playoff Game; thus, the Spartans are ranked third behind the Packers.
