= Bob Armstrong (American football) =

American football player (1909–1990)

No. 31
- Position: Tackle / Guard / Center

Personal information
- Born: February 16, 1909; Dallas, Texas, U.S.
- Died: February 28, 1990 (aged 81); San Antonio, Texas, U.S.
- Listed height: 5 ft 11 in (1.80 m)
- Listed weight: 221 lb (100 kg)

Career information
- High school: Oak Cliff (Dallas)
- College: Rice, Missouri

Career history
- Portsmouth Spartans (1931–1932)
- Stats at Pro Football Reference

Robert Alva Armstrong Jr. (February 16, 1909 – February 28, 1990) was an American professional football player who spent two seasons with the Portsmouth Spartans of the National Football League (NFL). He played college football at Rice and Missouri.

== Early life and college ==
Robert Alva Armstrong Jr. was born on February 16, 1909, in Dallas, Texas. He attended South Oak Cliff High School in Dallas.

Armstrong first played college football for the Rice Owls of Rice Institute. He the transferred to play for the Missouri Tigers of the University of Missouri, and was a two-year letterman from 1929 to 1930.

== Professional career ==
Armstrong played in all 14 games, starting three, for the Portsmouth Spartans of the National Football League during the 1931 season. The Spartans finished the year with an 11–3 record, good for second place in the NFL. Armstrong appeared in six games, starting five, in 1932.

== Personal life ==
Armstrong died on February 28, 1990, in San Antonio, Texas.
