= 1932 New York Giants season =

NFL team 8th season

- Head coach: Steve Owen
- Home stadium: Polo Grounds

Results
- Record: 4–6–2
- League place: 5th NFL
- Playoffs: Did not qualify

The 1932 New York Giants season was the franchise's 8th season in the National Football League.

== Schedule ==
Game	Date	Opponent	Result	Record	Venue	Recap
1	Bye					
2	September 25	at Portsmouth Spartans	L 0–7	0–1	Universal Stadium	Recap
3	October 2	at Green Bay Packers	L 0–13	0–2	City Stadium	Recap
4	October 9	at Boston Braves	L 6–14	0–3	Braves Field	Recap
5	October 16	Brooklyn Dodgers	W 20–12	1–3	Polo Grounds	Recap
6	October 23	Boston Braves	T 0–0	1–3–1	Polo Grounds	Recap
7	October 30	Portsmouth Spartans	L 0–6	1–4–1	Polo Grounds	Recap
8	November 6	Chicago Bears	L 8–28	1–5–1	Polo Grounds	Recap
9	November 13	Staten Island Stapletons	W 27–7	2–5–1	Polo Grounds	Recap
10	November 20	Green Bay Packers	W 6–0	3–5–1	Polo Grounds	Recap
11	November 24	at Staten Island Stapletons	T 13–13	3–5–2	Thompson Stadium	Recap
11	November 27	at Brooklyn Dodgers	W 13–7	4–5–2	Ebbets Field	Recap
12	December 4	at Chicago Bears	L 0–6	4–6–2	Wrigley Field	Recap

== Standings ==
NFL standings
	W	L	T	PCT	PF	PA	STK
Chicago Bears ^{1}	7	1	6	.875	160	44	W3
Green Bay Packers	10	3	1	.769	152	63	L2
Portsmouth Spartans ^{1}	6	2	4	.750	116	71	L1
Boston Braves	4	4	2	.500	55	79	W2
New York Giants	4	6	2	.400	93	113	L1
Brooklyn Dodgers	3	9	0	.250	63	131	L4
Chicago Cardinals	2	6	2	.250	72	114	L5
Staten Island Stapletons	2	7	3	.222	77	173	L1

Note: Tie games were not officially counted in the standings until 1972.

^{1} The Bears and Spartans records include the result of the 1932 NFL Playoff Game; thus, the Spartans are ranked third behind the Packers.

== See also ==
- List of New York Giants seasons
