= 1932 Staten Island Stapletons season =

National Football League team season

- Head coach: Harold Hansen
- Home stadium: Thompson Stadium

Results
- Record: 2–7–3
- Division place: 8th NFL
- Playoffs: Did not qualify

The 1932 Staten Island Stapletons season was their fourth and final in the league. The team failed to improve on their previous output of 4–6–1, winning only two games. They failed to qualify for the playoffs.

== Schedule ==
| Game | Date | Opponent | Result | Record | Venue | Game Recap |
|---|---|---|---|---|---|---|
| 1 | September 25 | Brooklyn Dodgers | L 0–7 | 0–1 | Thompson Stadium | Recap |
| 2 | October 2 | Chicago Bears | T 0–0 | 0–1–1 | Thompson Stadium | Recap |
| 3 | October 9 | at Brooklyn Dodgers | W 7–6 | 1–1–1 | Ebbets Field | Recap |
| 4 | October 16 | Portsmouth Spartans | T 7–7 | 1–1–2 | Thompson Stadium | Recap |
| 5 | October 20 | Portsmouth Spartans | L 6–13 | 1–2–2 | Thompson Stadium | Recap |
| 6 | October 23 | at Chicago Bears | L 7–27 | 1–3–2 | Wrigley Field | Recap |
| 7 | October 30 | at Green Bay Packers | L 0–26 | 1–4–2 | City Stadium | Recap |
| 8 | November 6 | at Boston Braves | L 6–19 | 1–5–2 | Braves Field | Recap |
| 9 | November 13 | at New York Giants | L 7–27 | 1–6–2 | Polo Grounds | Recap |
| 10 | November 20 | Chicago Cardinals | W 21–7 | 2–6–2 | Thompson Stadium | Recap |
| 11 | November 24 | New York Giants | T 13–13 | 2–6–3 | Thompson Stadium | Recap |
| 12 | November 27 | Green Bay Packers | L 3–21 | 2–7–3 | Thompson Stadium | Recap |

== Standings ==
NFL standings
| | W | L | T | PCT | PF | PA | STK |
|---|---|---|---|---|---|---|---|
| Chicago Bears ^{1} | 7 | 1 | 6 | .875 | 160 | 44 | W3 |
| Green Bay Packers | 10 | 3 | 1 | .769 | 152 | 63 | L2 |
| Portsmouth Spartans ^{1} | 6 | 2 | 4 | .750 | 116 | 71 | L1 |
| Boston Braves | 4 | 4 | 2 | .500 | 55 | 79 | W2 |
| New York Giants | 4 | 6 | 2 | .400 | 93 | 113 | L1 |
| Brooklyn Dodgers | 3 | 9 | 0 | .250 | 63 | 131 | L4 |
| Chicago Cardinals | 2 | 6 | 2 | .250 | 72 | 114 | L5 |
| Staten Island Stapletons | 2 | 7 | 3 | .222 | 77 | 173 | L1 |

Note: Tie games were not officially counted in the standings until 1972.

^{1} The Bears and Spartans records include the result of the 1932 NFL Playoff Game; thus, the Spartans are ranked third behind the Packers.
