= Johnny Sisk =

American football player (1906–1986)

No. 7
- Position: Running back

Personal information
- Born: December 11, 1906; New Haven, Connecticut, U.S.
- Died: May 27, 1986 (aged 79); Wauwatosa, Wisconsin, U.S.
- Listed height: 6 ft 2 in (1.88 m)
- Listed weight: 197 lb (89 kg)

Career information
- High school: Kankakee (IL) St. Viator Academy
- College: Marquette

Career history
- Chicago Bears (1932–1936)

Awards and highlights
- 2× NFL champion (1932, 1933)
- Stats at Pro Football Reference

John Martin Sisk Jr. (December 11, 1906 – May 27, 1986) was an American professional football player who played running back for five seasons for the Chicago Bears.
