= Am Rascher =

American football player (1908–1988)

- Rascher, circa 1938

No. 31
- Positions: Guard, tackle

Personal information
- Born: November 3, 1908; Cedar Lake, Indiana, U.S.
- Died: March 6, 1988 (aged 79); Hammond, Indiana, U.S.
- Listed height: 6 ft 2 in (1.88 m)
- Listed weight: 210 lb (95 kg)

Career information
- High school: Cedar Lake
- College: Indiana

Career history
- Portsmouth Spartans (1932)
- Stats at Pro Football Reference

Ambrose Henry Rascher (November 3, 1908 – March 6, 1988) was an American professional wrestler and football player. He played college football for the Indiana Hoosiers and professionally for the Portsmouth Spartans of the National Football League (NFL).

== Early life ==
Ambrose Henry Rascher was born on November 3, 1908, in Cedar Lake, Indiana. He attended Cedar Lake High School.

== College career ==
Rascher enrolled at Indiana University Bloomington to play college football for the Hoosiers. He was a three-year letterman from 1929 to 1931. He also wrestled for the Hoosiers.

== Professional football career ==
Rascher played in seven games, starting one, for the Portsmouth Spartans of the National Football League (NFL) in 1932 as a guard/tackle.

== Professional wrestling career ==
Rascher wrestled hundreds of matches all over the country from 1932 to 1943, including against Lou Thesz. He was later a pro wrestling promoter in Indiana.

== Personal life ==
Rascher was the organizer and director of the First National Bank of Cedar Lake and co-owner of Rascher-Fagen Insurance Agency. He was also the Indiana State Athletic Commissioner from 1952 to 1956. He was inducted into the Indiana Wrestling Hall of Fame on February 21, 1988. Rascher died on March 6, 1988, at St. Catherine Hospital in Hammond, Indiana.

== See also ==
- List of gridiron football players who became professional wrestlers
