= Dick Nesbitt =

American football player (1907–1962)

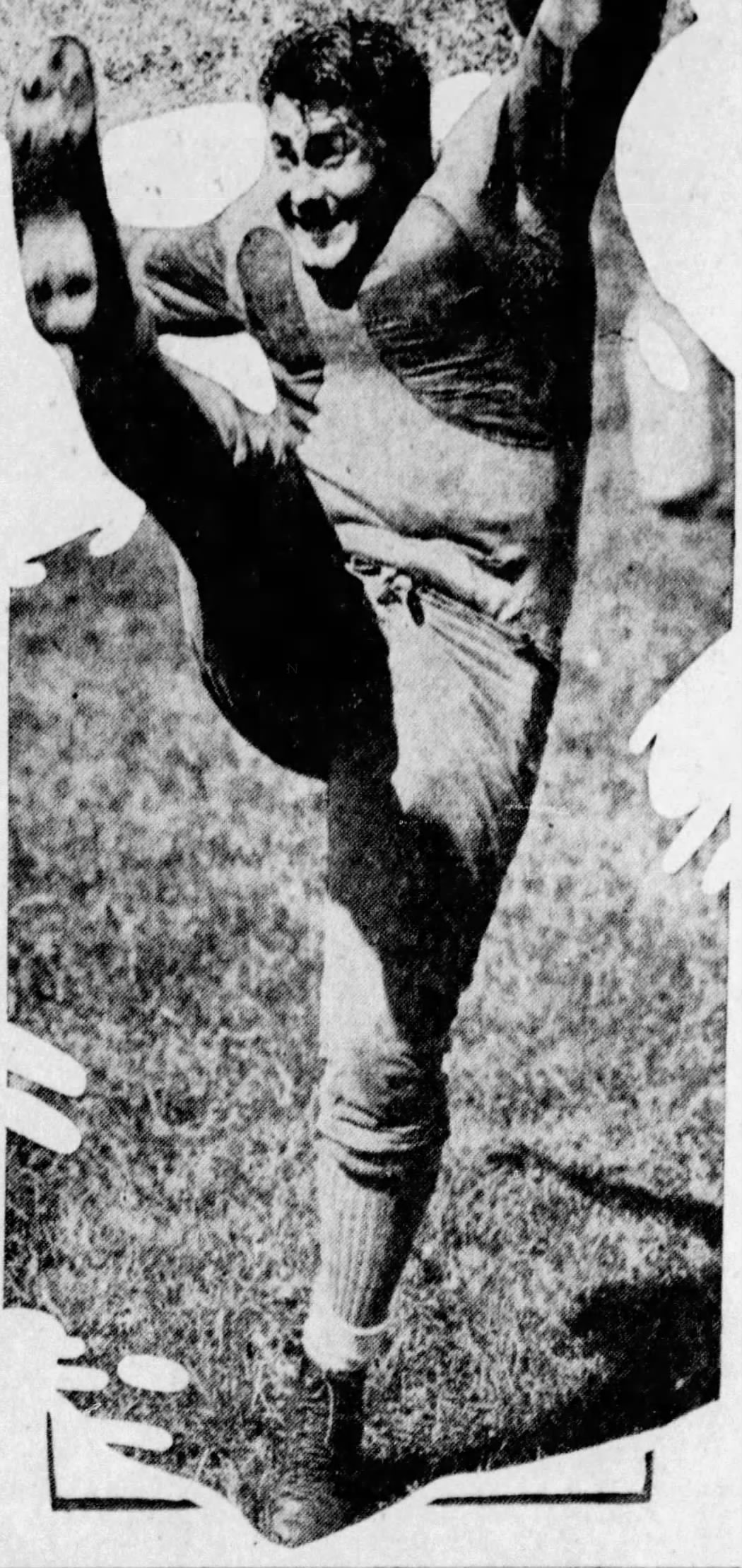
- Nesbitt in 1929

Profile
- Position: Running back

Personal information
- Born: November 14, 1907; Des Moines, Iowa, U.S.
- Died: March 5, 1962 (aged 54); St. Paul, Minnesota, U.S.
- Listed height: 6 ft 0 in (1.83 m)
- Listed weight: 204 lb (93 kg)

Career information
- High school: Des Moines (IA) Roosevelt
- College: Drake

Career history
- Chicago Bears (1930–1933); Chicago Cardinals (1933); Brooklyn Dodgers (1934)

Awards and highlights
- 2× NFL champion (1932, 1933)
- Stats at Pro Football Reference

Richard Jackson Nesbitt (November 14, 1907 – March 5, 1962) was an American professional football player who played running back for five seasons for the Chicago Bears, Chicago Cardinals, and Brooklyn Dodgers.

Nesbitt worked as sports anchor for KSTP-TV, St. Paul/Minneapolis, MN until his death in 1962.
