= Frank McNeil =

American football player (1909–1971)

Francis Kenneth McNeil
No. 34
- Position: End

Personal information
- Born: December 23, 1909; Brooklyn, New York, U.S.
- Died: October 3, 1971 (aged 61); Dade County, Florida, U.S.
- Listed height: 6 ft 0 in (1.83 m)
- Listed weight: 180 lb (82 kg)

Career information
- College: Washington & Jefferson

Career history
- Brooklyn Dodgers (1932)
- Stats at Pro Football Reference

Francis Kenneth McNeil (December 23, 1909 – October 3, 1971) was an American football player. He played professionally as an end for the Brooklyn Dodgers of the National Football League (NFL) in 1932. McNeil attended Washington & Jefferson College.

== See also ==
- 1932 Brooklyn Dodgers (NFL) season
