= John Wager =

American football player (1905–1982)

Profile
- Position: Center

Personal information
- Born: April 28, 1905; Massillon, Ohio
- Died: June 22, 1982 (aged 77); Portsmouth, Ohio
- Listed height: 5 ft 11 in (1.80 m)
- Listed weight: 203 lb (92 kg)

Career information
- College: Carthage

Career history
- Portsmouth Spartans (1931–1933)

Career statistics
- Games played: 30
- Stats at Pro Football Reference

John Byron Wager (April 28, 1905 – June 22, 1982) was a center in the National Football League. He played three seasons for the Portsmouth Spartans. Previously, he played four seasons at Carthage College.
