= Paul Franklin (American football) =

American football player (1906–1959)

Profile
- Position: Running back

Personal information
- Born: January 2, 1906; Plainfield, Indiana, U.S.
- Died: August 26, 1959 (aged 53); Mount Prospect, Illinois, U.S.
- Listed height: 6 ft 2 in (1.88 m)
- Listed weight: 198 lb (90 kg)

Career information
- High school: Plainfield (IN)
- College: Canterbury (IN)

Career history
- Chicago Bears (1931–1933)

Awards and highlights
- 2× NFL champion (1932, 1933)
- Stats at Pro Football Reference

Paul Roland Franklin (January 2, 1906 – August 26, 1959) was an American professional football player who played at the fullback, halfback, and end positions for the Chicago Bears from 1931 to 1933.

Franklin was born in 1906 in Plainfield, Indiana, and attended Plainfield High School. He attended Canterbury College and played college football there.

Franklin played football in the National Football League (NFL) for the Chicago Bears from 1931 to 1933. He scored his first NFL touchdown on November 22, 1931, on a 20-yard run against Brooklyn. He was a member of the Bears' 1932 and 1933 NFL championship team and appeared in 22 NFL games, five of them as a starter. He missed the first part of the 1933 season due to a fractured skull sustained in an automobile accident in August 1933. He also played in the American Football League for the Tulsa Oilers in 1934 and the East Chicago Indians in 1938 and 1939.

Franklin died in 1959 at his home in Mount Prospect, Illinois.
