= John Doehring =

American football player (1909–1972)

No. 11, 27
- Position: Halfback /Fullback

Personal information
- Born: November 6, 1909; Milwaukee, Wisconsin, U.S.
- Died: November 18, 1972 (aged 63); Milwaukee, Wisconsin, U.S.
- Listed weight: 235 lb (107 kg)

Career information
- High school: Milwaukee (WI) West Division

Career history
- Chicago Bears (1932–1934); Pittsburgh Steelers (1935); Chicago Bears (1936–1937)

Awards and highlights
- 2× NFL champion (1932, 1933)

Career statistics
- Rushing attempts-yards: 87-220
- Receptions-yards: 3-42
- Touchdowns: 1
- Stats at Pro Football Reference

John Doehring (November 6, 1909 – November 18, 1972) was an American professional football halfback/fullback in the National Football League (NFL). Despite never playing in college, he played professionally for the Chicago Bears (1932–1934, 1936–1937) and the Pittsburgh Pirates (1935).

== See also ==
- List of Chicago Bears players
- List of Pittsburgh Steelers players
