= Coffee Springs, Alabama =

- Town
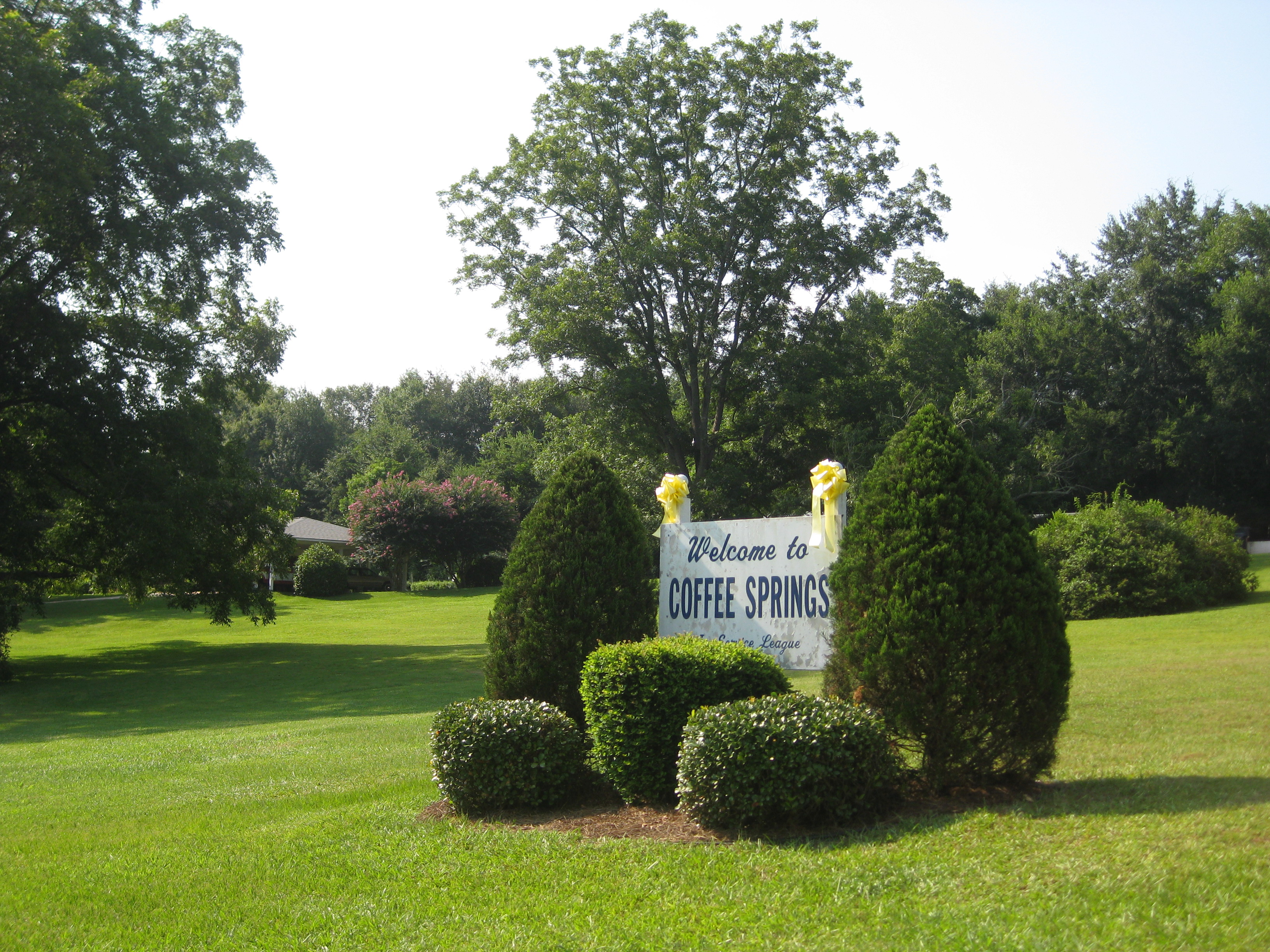
- Welcome sign in Coffee Springs

- Location of Coffee Springs in Geneva County, Alabama.
- Coordinates: 31°09′59″N 85°54′37″W
- Country: United States
- State: Alabama
- County: Geneva

Area
  - Total: 0.80 sq mi (2.06 km^{2})
  - Land: 0.78 sq mi (2.03 km^{2})
  - Water: 0.012 sq mi (0.03 km^{2})
- Elevation: 246 ft (75 m)

Population (2020)
  - Total: 206
  - Density: 262.8/sq mi (101.47/km^{2})
- Time zone: UTC-6 (Central (CST))
  - Summer (DST): UTC-5 (CDT)
- ZIP code: 36318
- Area code: 334
- FIPS code: 01-16240
- GNIS feature ID: 2406288

Coffee Springs is a town in Geneva County, Alabama, United States. It was incorporated in 1900 and is part of the Dothan, Alabama Metropolitan Statistical Area. As of the 2020 census, Coffee Springs had a population of 206.

== Geography ==
According to the U.S. Census Bureau, the town has a total area of 0.8 square miles (2.1 km^{2}), of which 0.8 square miles (2.1 km^{2}) is land and 1.25% is water.

=== Climate ===
The climate in this area is characterized by hot, humid summers and generally mild to cool winters. According to the Köppen Climate Classification system, Coffee Springs has a humid subtropical climate, abbreviated "Cfa" on climate maps.

== Demographics ==
Historical population
Census	Pop.	Note	%±
1910	503		—
1920	312		−38.0%
1930	258		−17.3%
1940	196		−24.0%
1950	173		−11.7%
1960	205		18.5%
1970	329		60.5%
1980	339		3.0%
1990	294		−13.3%
2000	251		−14.6%
2010	228		−9.2%
2020	206		−9.6%
U.S. Decennial Census; 2013 Estimate

As of the census of 2000, there were 251 people, 108 households, and 74 families residing in the town. The population density was 320.3 inhabitants per square mile (123.7/km^{2}). There were 128 housing units at an average density of 163.3 per square mile (63.1/km^{2}). The racial makeup of the town was 93.23% White, 3.98% Black or African American, and 2.79% from two or more races.

There were 108 households, out of which 17.6% had children under the age of 18 living with them, 57.4% were married couples living together, 12.0% had a female householder with no husband present, and 30.6% were non-families. 24.1% of all households were made up of individuals, and 15.7% had someone living alone who was 65 years of age or older. The average household size was 2.32 and the average family size was 2.77.

In the town, the population was spread out, with 16.7% under the age of 18, 8.0% from 18 to 24, 18.3% from 25 to 44, 36.3% from 45 to 64, and 20.7% who were 65 years of age or older. The median age was 50 years. For every 100 females, there were 78.0 males. For every 100 females age 18 and over, there were 77.1 males.

The median income for a household in the town was $26,477, and the median income for a family was $30,000. Males had a median income of $28,750 versus $15,833 for females. The per capita income for the town was $12,393. About 13.8% of families and 17.1% of the population were below the poverty line, including 15.4% of those under the age of eighteen and 25.3% of those 65 or over.

== Notable person ==
- Jim Bowdoin, professional American football player who played guard for seven seasons for five teams
