= Stu Worden =

American football player (1907–1978)

Profile
- Positions: Guard, tackle, center

Personal information
- Born: May 6, 1907; Abingdon, Virginia, U.S.
- Died: March 17, 1978 (aged 70); Elkton, Virginia, U.S.
- Listed height: 6 ft 0 in (1.83 m)
- Listed weight: 210 lb (95 kg)

Career information
- High school: Greenbrier Military Academy (WV)
- College: Hampden-Sydney

Career history
- Brooklyn Dodgers (1930, 1932-1934)

Stuart Barrett Worden (May 6, 1907 – March 17, 1978), sometimes known as "Speck", was an American football player.

Worden was born in 1907 in Abingdon, Virginia. He graduated from the Greenbrier Military School in Lewisburg, West Virginia, and then enrolled at Hampden–Sydney College in Hampden Sydney, Virginia. He played college football for Hampden-Sydney from 1925 to 1928. Coach Charlie Bernier of Hampden-Sydney called Worden "the greatest lineman Hampden-Sydney has ever turned out."

Worden also played professional football in the National Football League (NFL), principally at guard but also some at tackle, for the Brooklyn Dodgers during the 1930, 1932, 1933, and 1934 seasons. He appeared in 44 NFL games, 35 as a starter. He was rated as "one of the best guards in football."

Worden was married to Blair Lewis, and they had two daughters. He died in 1978 in Elkton, Virginia, at age 71.
