= Ollie Sansen =

American football player (1908–1987)

- Sansen in 1930

Profile
- Position: Halfback

Personal information
- Born: March 6, 1908; Alta, Iowa
- Died: March 21, 1987 (aged 79); San Lorenzo, California
- Listed height: 6 ft 1 in (1.85 m)
- Listed weight: 193 lb (88 kg)

Career information
- High school: Alta (Iowa)
- College: Iowa

Career history
- Brooklyn Dodgers (1932–1935)
- Stats at Pro Football Reference

Oliver Marsten Sansen (March 6, 1908 – March 21, 1987) was an American football player.

Sansen was born in Alta, Iowa, in 1908. He played college football for the Iowa Hawkeyes from 1929 to 1931. He was selected as the most valuable player on the 1930 Iowa Hawkeyes football team. He also competed in the shot put and hammer throw for the Iowa track team.

He then played professional football in the National Football League (NFL) as a fullback for the Brooklyn Dodgers. He appeared in 41 NFL games, 22 as a starter, from 1932 to 1935.

In January 1936, Sansen accepted a job as a salesman for Bankers Trust Co. in New York City, deciding then to end his football career. He later lived in San Lorenzo, California, and sold automobiles in Alameda, California. In 1961, he was honored as one of the nation's top 100 salesmen by the American Motors Corporation. He died in 1987.
