= Paul Engebretsen =

American football player (1910–1979)

No. 21, 26, 15, 69, 34
- Position: Tackle / Guard / Placekicker

Personal information
- Born: July 27, 1910; Chariton, Iowa, U.S.
- Died: March 31, 1979 (aged 68); Chariton, Iowa, U.S.
- Listed height: 6 ft 1 in (1.85 m)
- Listed weight: 238 lb (108 kg)

Career information
- High school: Chariton (IA)
- College: Northwestern

Career history
- Chicago Bears (1932); Chicago Cardinals (1933); Pittsburgh Pirates (1933); Brooklyn Dodgers (1934); Green Bay Packers (1934–1941)

Awards and highlights
- 3× NFL champion (1932, 1936, 1939); Green Bay Packers Hall of Fame

Career statistics
- Games played: 94
- starts: 44
- Stats at Pro Football Reference

Paul Joseph “Tiny” Engebretsen (July 27, 1910 – March 31, 1979) was an American professional football player who played offensive lineman and placekicker for the Chicago Bears, Chicago Cardinals, Pittsburgh Pirates, Brooklyn Dodgers, and Green Bay Packers.

== Biography ==
Paul J. Engebretsen was born in Chariton, a town in Lucas County, Iowa to Henry J. Engebretsen (1880–1974) and Frankie Ophelia Kridelbaugh (1881–1972). He was named most valuable player of the Big Ten co-champion in 1931 playing at Northwestern University. Engebretsen had a large presence in his 1932 rookie season with the Chicago Bears, starting at guard and leading the NFL in extra points (10) and attempts (15). He was acquired in a trade with the Brooklyn Dodgers in 1934 and played for nine years in Green Bay.

He was an all-league choice on the 1936 and 1939 champion Packer teams, topped the NFL in extra points (18) in 1939 and retired on September 16, 1941, two days after the season opener. In the NFL, Engebretsen scored 100 points on 15 of 28 field-goal tries and 55 of 62 extra-point attempts. After retiring, he became a Packer scout. In 1941, he coached the Buffalo Tigers of the third American Football League. Engebretsen was inducted into the Green Bay Packers Hall of Fame in 1978.
