= 1932 NFL season =

American football season

Regular season
- Duration: September 18 – December 11, 1932
- Because the Portsmouth Spartans and the Chicago Bears finished the season tied for first place, a playoff game was held to determine the NFL champion.
- Champions: Chicago Bears

NFL teams

The 1932 NFL season was the 13th regular season of the National Football League. It was a year marked by a decrease in the number of franchises to just eight and the last time all teams were encompassed in a single division.

The league title was won by the Chicago Bears in a championship playoff game against the Portsmouth Spartans.

== Teams ==
The league decreased to eight teams in 1932.

First season in NFL *	Last active season †

Team	Head coach	Stadium
Boston Braves *	Lud Wray	Braves Field
Brooklyn Dodgers	Benny Friedman	Ebbets Field
Chicago Bears	Ralph Jones	Wrigley Field
Chicago Cardinals	Jack Chevigny	Comiskey Park
Green Bay Packers	Curly Lambeau	City Stadium
New York Giants	Steve Owen	Polo Grounds
Portsmouth Spartans	George Clark	Universal Stadium
Staten Island Stapletons †	Harold Hansen	Thompson Stadium

== Season history ==
While the Boston Braves (today's Washington Commanders) joined the NFL for the 1932 season, the loss of the Providence Steam Roller, Cleveland Indians, and Frankford Yellow Jackets reduced the league's membership to just eight teams — the fewest in NFL history. The league would again cut down to just eight teams during the 1943 NFL season due to World War II.

Teams did not play an equal number of games during the 1932 season, with the total of games played ranging from 10 (Chicago Cardinals, Boston Braves) to 14 (Green Bay Packers, Chicago Bears). The other four teams in the league played a 12 game schedule.

Following the 1932 season, the NFL would be split into two divisions with the winner of each meeting at the end of the year in a Championship Playoff game.

== Championship race ==
The Green Bay Packers were unbeaten (8–0–1) after nine games, and after the Thanksgiving weekend, their 10–1–1 record (.909) was still well ahead of Portsmouth at 5–1–4 (.833) and Chicago at 4–1–6 (.800).

In Week Twelve (December 4), the Spartans handed the Packers a 19–0 defeat, while the Bears beat the Giants 6–0. Portsmouth, at 6–1–4 (.857), took the lead, while the Packers (10–2–1) and the Bears (5–1–6) were tied for second (.833).

In Week Thirteen, the Bears hosted the Packers; a Green Bay win would have seen the Packers finish second with an 11–2–1 record (.846) and hand Portsmouth their first ever title. The Bears beat the Packers 9–0, meaning the Bears finished at 6–1–6 (.857), and were tied for first with Portsmouth.

Despite the fact that their December 18 game was referred to as a playoff, the Bears' 9–0 win over Portsmouth counted in the regular season standings: as such, while the Bears finished at 7–1–6 (.875) and won the 1932 title, it was the Packers who finished as runners-up, while the Spartans finished in third at 6–2–4 (.750).

== Standings ==
NFL standings
	W	L	T	PCT	PF	PA	STK
Chicago Bears ^{1}	7	1	6	.875	160	44	W3
Green Bay Packers	10	3	1	.769	152	63	L2
Portsmouth Spartans ^{1}	6	2	4	.750	116	71	L1
Boston Braves	4	4	2	.500	55	79	W2
New York Giants	4	6	2	.400	93	113	L1
Brooklyn Dodgers	3	9	0	.250	63	131	L4
Chicago Cardinals	2	6	2	.250	72	114	L5
Staten Island Stapletons	2	7	3	.222	77	173	L1

Note: Tie games were not officially counted in the standings until 1972.

^{1} The Bears and Spartans records include the result of the 1932 NFL Playoff Game; thus, the Spartans are ranked third behind the Packers.

== Championship playoff ==
There was a tie for first place in the standings at the end of the 1932 regular season: as tied games did not count until 1972, the Portsmouth Spartans record of 6–1–4 and the Bears record of 6–1–6 were taken to be six wins, one loss, giving both teams an .857 win percentage.

Had pure win–loss differential or the current (post-1972) system of counting ties as half a win, half a loss been in place in 1932, the Packers' record of 10–3–1 (.750, +7) would have won them the championship, ahead of the Spartans' 6–1–4 (.727, +5) and the Bears' 6–1–6 (.692, +5). However, it would not have been the fourth consecutive championship, but the second consecutive title (and third in four seasons) because had the current rules also applied during previous seasons, the New York Giants would have won the NFL championship in 1930 instead of the Packers.

Since both games between the Bears and Spartans had ended in ties, the NFL arranged for a playoff game to decide the NFL championship, the first ever game of its kind.

Extremely cold weather forced the game to be moved from Wrigley Field to the indoor Chicago Stadium: as the makeshift football field in the stadium was only 80 yards long with undersized endzones, officials moved the goal posts to the goal line due to a lack of space to put them at the back of the end zone, as was standard in college and professional football. This change was favored by players and fans, and the goal posts were moved to the goal line as one of several rule changes the league made in 1933, with the rule lasting until 1973.

The Bears won the playoff game 9–0, which was scoreless until the fourth quarter: since the playoff game counted in the final standings, the Spartans finished the season in third place behind runners-up Green Bay.

1932 NFL Playoff, Portsmouth Spartans at Chicago Bears

Quarter	1	2	3	4	Total
Spartans	0	0	0	0	0
Bears	0	0	0	9	9

at Chicago Stadium, Chicago, Illinois

- Date: December 18
- Game time: 8:15 p.m. CST
- Game weather: Indoors
- Game attendance: 11,198
- Referee: Bobby Cahn
- Boxscore

Game information

Fourth quarter

- CHB Red Grange 2 yard pass from Bronko Nagurski (Paul Engebretsen kick)
- CHB Safety, Mule Wilson tackled in end zone

== Statistical leaders ==
The 1932 season marked a major landmark for the National Football League — the first year in which official statistics were tracked and retained. During this first foray into official record-keeping, certain statistics later regarded as staples were not maintained. These included interceptions, punting average, kickoff return yardage and average, and field goal percentage, among others.

	Name	Team	Yards
Passing	1. Arnie "Flash" Heber	Green Bay Packers	639
	2. Walt Holmer	Chicago Bears	449
	3. Jack McBride	New York Giants	363
Rushing	1. Cliff Battles	Boston Braves	606
	2. Bronko Nagurski	Chicago Bears	573
	3. Bob Campiglio	Staten Island Stapletons	524
Receiving	1. Ray Flaherty	New York Giants	350
	2. Luke Johnsos	Chicago Bears	321
	3. Harry Ebding	Portsmouth Spartans	171
Touchdowns	1. Red Grange	Chicago Bears	7
	2. Dutch Clark	Portsmouth Spartans	6
	3. Jack Grossman	Brooklyn Dodgers	5
	3. Ray Flaherty	New York Giants	5

Source: Pete Palmer, et al. (eds.), The ESPN Pro Football Encyclopedia. First Edition. New York: Sterling Publishing, 2006; p. 1040.
