= Jack Grossman =

Polish American football wide receiver (1910–1983)

- Grossman in 1935

Profile
- Position: Halfback

Personal information
- Born: November 1, 1910; New York City, USA
- Died: February 6, 1983 (aged 72); Hollywood, Florida

Career information
- College: Rutgers

Career history
- 1932–1935: Brooklyn Dodgers

Career statistics
- Games played: 34
- Starts: 15
- Yards rushing: 646 (2.4 average)
- Rushing TDs: 4
- Yards receiving: 356 (15.5 average)
- Receiving TDs: 4
- Stats at Pro Football Reference

John "Jack" Grossman (November 1, 1910 – February 6, 1983) was an American football halfback who played four seasons for the Brooklyn Dodgers. He attended Rutgers College. He was not drafted. In 1932 selected for 2nd Team All-NFL.
