= 1932 Green Bay Packers season =

NFL team season

- Head coach: Curly Lambeau
- Home stadium: City Stadium

Results
- Record: 10–3–1
- League place: 2nd NFL
- Playoffs: None Scheduled

The 1932 Green Bay Packers season was their 14th season overall and their 12th in the National Football League. The team finished with a 10–3–1 record under founder and head coach Curly Lambeau, earning them a second-place finish despite winning three more games than the champion Chicago Bears. With only one loss, the Bears' winning percentage was calculated by the league at .875, as ties were discarded, compared to the Packers' .769.

The Bears and Portsmouth Spartans were tied for first at the end of the season and played an extra game; the winner was the league champion and the loser finished in third in the standings. The game was played indoors on a shortened field and the Bears won, 9–0. Entering December, the Packers were 10–1–1, but were shut out on the road by both Portsmouth and the Bears to close out the season; Green Bay had defeated both teams in October.

In 1933, the NFL divided into two divisions and began an annual NFL championship game to decide the league's crown.

== Schedule ==
Week	Date	Opponent	Result	Record	Venue
1	September 18	Chicago Cardinals	W 15–7	1–0	City Stadium
2	September 25	Chicago Bears	T 0–0	1–0–1	City Stadium
3	October 2	New York Giants	W 13–0	2–0–1	City Stadium
4	October 9	Portsmouth Spartans	W 15–10	3–0–1	City Stadium
5	October 16	at Chicago Bears	W 2–0	4–0–1	Wrigley Field
6	October 23	Brooklyn Dodgers	W 13–0	5–0–1	City Stadium
7	October 30	Staten Island Stapletons	W 26–0	6–0–1	City Stadium
8	November 6	at Chicago Cardinals	W 19–9	7–0–1	Wrigley Field
9	November 13	at Boston Braves	W 21–0	8–0–1	Braves Field
10	November 20	at New York Giants	L 0–6	8–1–1	Polo Grounds
11	November 24	at Brooklyn Dodgers	W 7–0	9–1–1	Ebbets Field
12	November 27	at Staten Island Stapletons	W 21–3	10–1–1	Thompson Stadium
13	December 4	at Portsmouth Spartans	L 0–19	10–2–1	Universal Stadium
14	December 11	at Chicago Bears	L 0–9	10–3–1	Wrigley Field

== Standings ==
NFL standings
	W	L	T	PCT	PF	PA	STK
Chicago Bears ^{1}	7	1	6	.875	160	44	W3
Green Bay Packers	10	3	1	.769	152	63	L2
Portsmouth Spartans ^{1}	6	2	4	.750	116	71	L1
Boston Braves	4	4	2	.500	55	79	W2
New York Giants	4	6	2	.400	93	113	L1
Brooklyn Dodgers	3	9	0	.250	63	131	L4
Chicago Cardinals	2	6	2	.250	72	114	L5
Staten Island Stapletons	2	7	3	.222	77	173	L1

Note: Tie games were not officially counted in the standings until 1972.

^{1} The Bears and Spartans records include the result of the 1932 NFL Playoff Game; thus, the Spartans are ranked third behind the Packers.
