= Portsmouth Spartans =

American football team, 1928–1933

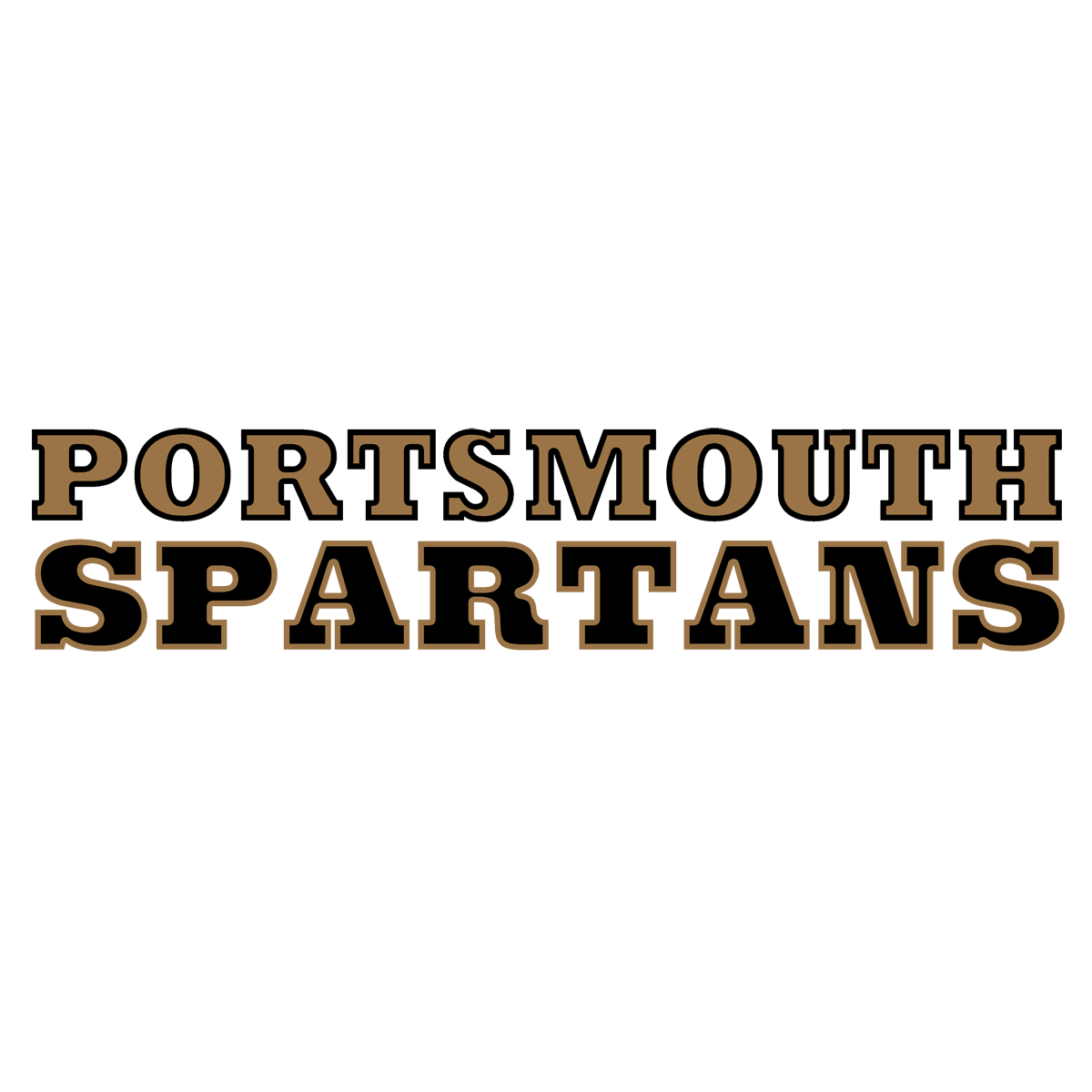
Logo

General information
- Founded: 1928
- Stadium: Universal Stadium
- Headquartered: Portsmouth, Ohio
- Colors: Purple, gold, white

Personnel
- Owners: Portsmouth National League Football Corporation; Harry N. Snyder (largest shareholder)
- Head coach: Hal Griffen (1930); George "Potsy" Clark (1931–1933)

Team history
- Portsmouth Spartans (1928–1933); Detroit Lions (1934–present)

League / conference affiliations
- Independent (1928–1929) National Football League (1930–1933): Western Division (1933)

Playoff appearances (1)
- NFL: 1932

The Portsmouth Spartans were a professional American football team that played in Portsmouth, Ohio, from their founding in 1928 to their relocation to Detroit in 1934. Originally drawing players from defunct independent professional and semi-professional teams, they joined the fledgling National Football League (NFL) in 1930. Their home stadium was Universal Stadium, known today as Spartan Municipal Stadium.

The team was sold to a new ownership group in 1934 and relocated to Detroit, where they became the Detroit Lions — a team which remains part of the NFL today.

== History ==
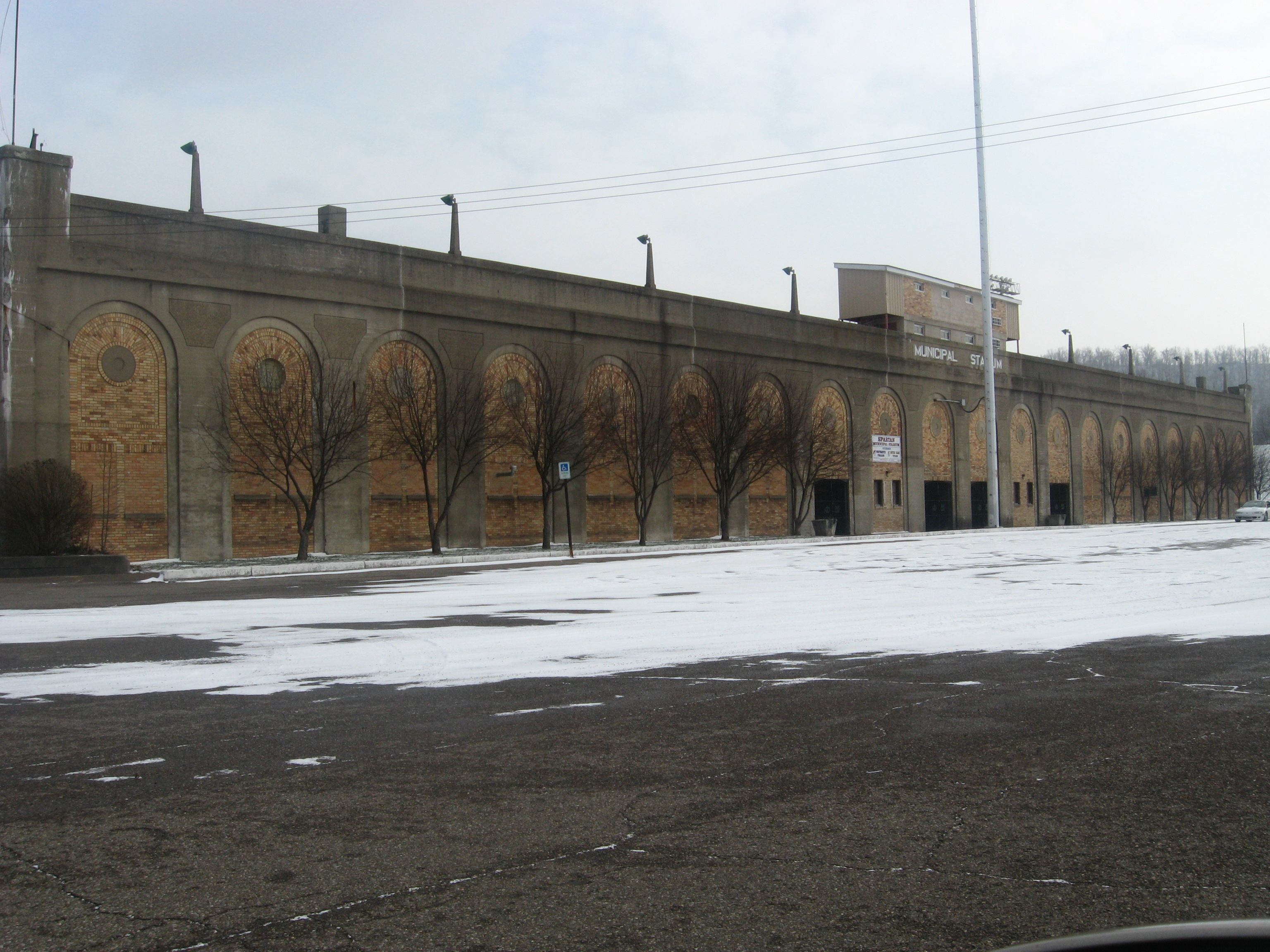
The Spartans' home field in 2008, now known as Spartan Municipal Stadium.

The Spartans formed in 1928 when the team began importing players from defunct independent professional and semi-professional teams. The following year, Portsmouth residents agreed to fund the construction of a football stadium that was comparable to those in neighboring communities along the Ohio River. That approval prompted the National Football League to grant the city a franchise on July 12, 1930.

The Spartans played their first NFL game at Universal Stadium on September 14. With fewer than 43,000 residents in 1930, Portsmouth became the NFL's second smallest city, ahead of only Green Bay, which had a population of under 38,000. During the team's first year in the league, the Spartans compiled a record of 5–6–3, tying for seventh place in the eleven-team league in 1930.

At the end of the 1931 season, the Green Bay Packers refused to play the Spartans in a game that had been tentatively scheduled since before the season had started. The Packers had the best record in the league at 12–2, but had not played the Spartans, who had the second-best record at 11–3. The president of the Packers at the time, Lee Joannes, said there was "no logical reason" to play the Spartans. This led to a new regime for scheduling the entire NFL season of games in advance, by a three-person committee designated by the NFL itself. Ratification by three-fourths of all NFL teams was required before a season would be played. It was the end of ad hoc scheduling by teams and eventually led to NFL teams only playing other NFL teams.

An early highlight of the 1932 season was the "iron man" game against the Green Bay Packers. In that game, Spartans coach Potsy Clark refused to make even a single substitution against the defending NFL champion Packers. Portsmouth won 19–0 and used only 11 players all game. At the end of the season, the Spartans were tied for first place in the league with the Chicago Bears. That prompted what in retrospect became known as the first NFL playoff game. Blizzard conditions in Chicago meant the game was moved from Wrigley Field's outdoor field to the indoor field at Chicago Stadium, which allowed for only an 80-yard field. The Bears won the game 9–0, with a touchdown pass from Bronko Nagurski to Red Grange being the key play. The resulting interest led to the establishment of the Eastern and Western Divisions and a regular championship game beginning in 1933.

During their final three years in Portsmouth, the Spartans posted a record of 23–9–4, a .718 winning percentage that was surpassed only by the Bears. Despite their success on the gridiron, the Spartans were fighting to survive off the field. The team was in so much debt that the players received shares in the team in lieu of their salaries.

In 1934, a group led by George A. Richards, the owner of Detroit radio station WJR, was announced as having bought the Spartans and moved them to Detroit for the 1934 season. Richards renamed the team the Detroit Lions. He not only wanted to offer a nod to the Detroit Tigers, but also wanted to signal his goal of building a team that would be the "king of the NFL."

== List of seasons ==
One-Game Playoff Berth

Season	Team's season	League	Conference	Division	Regular season				Postseason results	Awards
Season	Team's season	League	Conference	Division	Finish	Wins	Losses	Ties	Postseason results	Awards
Portsmouth Spartans
1928	1928	Independent	–	–	–	9	3	2	The Spartans did not compete in a professional league until 1930.	
1929	1929	Independent	–	–	–	12	2	1	The Spartans did not compete in a professional league until 1930.	
1930	1930	NFL	–	–	T–7th	5	6	3	The NFL did not hold playoff games until 1932.	
1931	1931	NFL	–	–	2nd	11	3	0	The NFL did not hold playoff games until 1932.	
1932	1932	NFL	–	–	3rd	6	2	4	Lost Playoff Game^{12} (Bears) (9–0)	
1933	1933	NFL	–	Western	2nd	6	5	0		
1934	Relocated to become the Detroit Lions									
Totals						28	16	7	(1930–1933)	

^{1} The result of the 1932 NFL Playoff Game to determine the NFL champion between the Chicago Bears and the Portsmouth Spartans counted in the standings.
^{2} Prior to the 1972 season, ties did not count in the NFL standings. Therefore, the Bears (6–1–6) and the Spartans (6–1–4) were considered to be tied atop the standings ahead of the Packers (10–3–1).
