= Spartan Municipal Stadium =

Stadium in Portsmouth, Ohio

Coordinates: 38°43′43″N 82°58′42″W

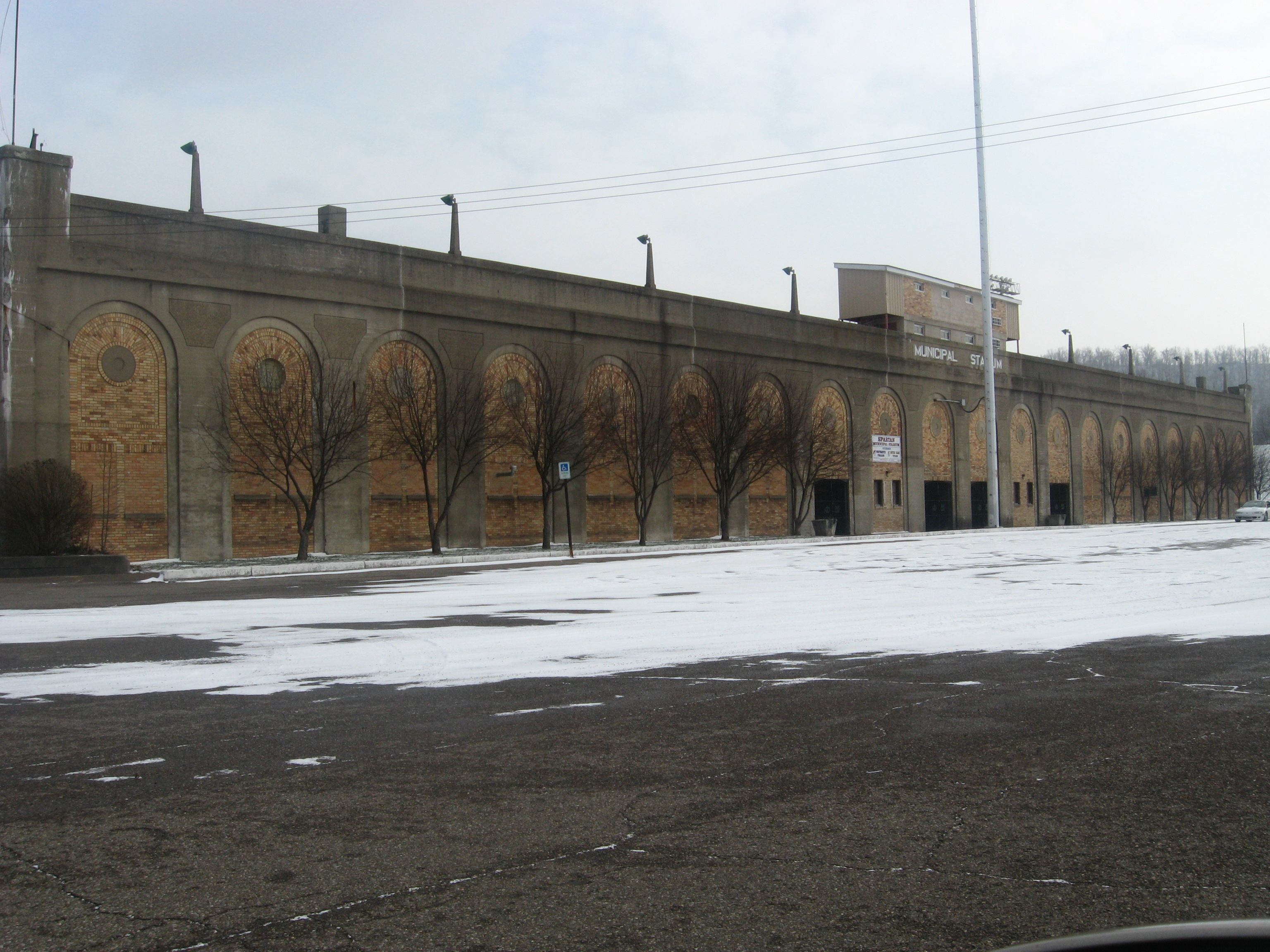
- Interactive map of Spartan Municipal Stadium
- Full name: Spartan Municipal Stadium
- Former names: Universal Stadium (1928-1970)
- Address: 56 James Street; Portsmouth, Ohio; United States
- Owner: Shawnee State University
- Operator: Shawnee State University
- Capacity: 8,500
- Surface: Grass

Construction
- Opened: 1928

Tenants
- Portsmouth Spartans (NFL) (1930–1933); Notre Dame High School football (SOC) (1928–present); Shawnee State Bears football (NCAA) (2028–future)

Spartan Municipal Stadium, formerly known as Universal Stadium, is a stadium in Portsmouth, Ohio. It hosted the National Football League's Portsmouth Spartans (now the Detroit Lions) from 1930 to 1933, as well as local high school teams. The stadium held 8,200 people at its peak and was built in 1928. In 1970, it was renamed Spartan Municipal Stadium. On October 5, 2003, the stadium was designated as a state historical site. The stadium is owned by Shawnee State University. After a fire in the 1990s, the city replaced walls and the press box. The lighting was upgraded using funds from a USDA grant. Several years ago, the city began limiting stadium use to only regular football games to help preserve the sod. In the past, both Portsmouth and Notre Dame High School football teams have played at the facility. The city wanted to sell the stadium to the Portsmouth City School District for one dollar, but the district turned down the offer as they received $10 million from a local foundation to construct their own athletic complex next to the new city school complex.

Notre Dame High School intends to remain at Spartan Stadium. The city has discussed demolishing the stadium for future development but local residents have expressed the need to preserve the historical site.

Spartan Municipal Stadium was recently identified through Portsmouth's participation in the America's Best Communities competition as an invaluable asset for the development of Portsmouth's riverfront area. In September 2017, Dr. Sean Dunne, a Sociology professor at Shawnee State University, submitted an application to State Farm's Neighborhood Assist Program for $25,000 to help renovate the stadium. In October 2017, it was announced that the application had advanced to the final round of 200 applications. After ten days of online voting, the grant was selected as one of 40 projects to win $25,000. The money has been used to begin the process of renovation at the stadium, with further renovation work to follow.

In July 2024, Portsmouth City Council voted to transfer Spartan Municipal Stadium and the surrounding land to Shawnee State University. The university intends to renovate the stadium as a community asset. In June 2025, Shawnee State University announced that they will field a football team beginning in 2028 with the renovated Spartan Municipal Stadium serving as the Bears home field.

Preceded by first stadium	Home of the Portsmouth Spartans; 1930 – 1933	Succeeded by University of Detroit Stadium
