= 1932 NFL Playoff Game =

American football game

Coordinates: 41.8817°N 87.6728°W

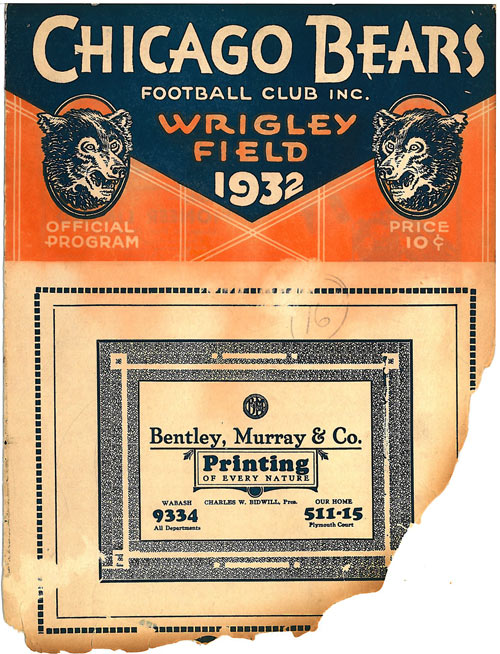
Portsmouth Spartans (6–1–4)	Chicago Bears (6–1–6)
0	9
Head coach: George Clark	Head coach: Ralph Jones
	1	2	3	4	Total
POR	0	0	0	0	0
CHB	0	0	0	9	9
- Date: December 18, 1932
- Stadium: Chicago Stadium; Chicago, Illinois

Location in the United States

The 1932 NFL Playoff Game was an extra game held to break a tie in the 1932 season's final standings in the National Football League (NFL); it matched the host Chicago Bears and the Portsmouth Spartans. Because of snowfall and anticipated extremely cold temperatures in Chicago, Illinois, it was moved indoors and played at the three-year-old Chicago Stadium on December 18 on a reduced-size field on Sunday night. The Bears won, beating the Spartans 9–0.

== Standings controversy ==
Since the NFL's first season in 1920, the league title had been awarded to the team with the best regular season record based on winning percentage with ties excluded.

While four of the first six championships were disputed, only once (in 1921) did two teams finish tied for first place in the standings: the Chicago Staleys, who became the Bears the following year, and the Buffalo All-Americans finished with identical 9-1 records, and had split a two-game series with each other, but league officials used a tiebreaker to controversially give the Staleys the title over the All-Americans.

In 1932, the Spartans and the Bears tied for first place with 6–1 records.

Under the rules at the time, standings were based on winning percentage with ties excluded from the calculation: thus, the Spartans and Bears each finished the regular season with identical .857 winning percentages, ahead of the defending champion Green Bay Packers' .769 (10 wins, 3 losses) winning percentage.

Had pure win–loss differential or the current (post-1972) system of counting ties as half a win, half a loss been in place in 1932, the Packers' record of 10–3–1 (.750, +7) would have won them a fourth consecutive championship, ahead of the Spartans' 6–1–4 (.727, +5) and the Bears' 6–1–6 (.692, +5). The Packers controlled their own destiny at the end of the 1932 season, but lost their last two games to the Spartans and the Bears.

Further complicating matters, though the Spartans and Bears had played each other twice during the regular season and the league's head-to-head tiebreaker accounted for a split two-game series, this tiebreaker only applied if each team won one game: the winner of the second game would be awarded the tiebreaker and the championship. As the two Bears-Spartans games ended in 13–13 and 7–7 ties, this tiebreaker was of no effect.

The league was thus required to make a rule change, as championship-deciding postseason matches were banned in 1924, and for the first time, arranged for a single game (essentially a replay) to determine the NFL champion.

Despite the winner of the game being declared champions, it was ruled the game would be counted in the final standings, meaning the loser would drop to 6–2 (.750) and finish third behind runner-up Green Bay.

== Indoor field ==
The game was played indoors at Chicago Stadium

The game was set to be played at Wrigley Field, the Bears' home stadium, but due to severe blizzards followed by extremely cold temperatures and wind chill, the game was moved indoors to Chicago Stadium. The Stadium at that time was the largest indoor arena in the world with a maximum seating capacity of 26,000.

Two years earlier, the Bears and Cardinals had played a charity exhibition game at the arena after the 1930 season. The game was moved indoors due to extreme weather, allowing for reasonable attendance and gate revenue. The Bears won 9–7. It wasn't an uncommon practice in the city, as local teams played in the Dexter Park Pavilion as early as 1917, when the Racine Cardinals and the Evanstons from Evanston played to a scoreless tie.

A week before the game, the concrete surface had tanbark placed atop for a Salvation Army-sponsored circus; elephant manure from the circus produced an odor that caused a Bears player to vomit on the field.

Because of the limited dimensions of the indoor arena, special rules were adopted for the game:

- The tanbark-covered field itself was only 80 yards long (60 yards between the goal lines) and 45 yards wide, ten yards narrower than the regulation width at the time.
- The goal posts were moved from the endlines to the goal lines (the NFL moved the goalposts to the goal line in 1933, then back to the endline in 1974).
- Every time a team crossed the 10-yard line, the ball was moved back 20 yards to allow for the shortened field.
- For the first time, all plays started with the ball on or between the hash marks, which were ten yards from the sidelines.

It was also decided that due to the smaller field and indoor stadium, drop kicks and field goals would not be used in the game.

== Game summary ==
1932 NFL Playoff, Portsmouth Spartans at Chicago Bears

Quarter	1	2	3	4	Total
Spartans	0	0	0	0	0
Bears	0	0	0	9	9

at Chicago Stadium, Chicago, Illinois

- Date: December 18
- Game time: 8:15 p.m. CST
- Game weather: Indoors
- Game attendance: 11,198
- Referee: Bobby Cahn
- Boxscore

Game information

Fourth quarter

- CHI − Red Grange 2-yard pass from Bronko Nagurski (Paul Engebretsen kick). Bears 7−0
- CHI − Safety, Mule Wilson tackled in end zone. Bears 9−0

The high temperature for that Sunday in Chicago was 20 °F (−7 °C), warmer than anticipated earlier in the week.

With terrible footing on the mulch and limited room for the offenses to work, the defenses dominated the game's first three quarters, with the game remaining scoreless. Bears quarterback John Doehling's first pass flew into the stands, as did most punts and kickoffs: one collided with a Chicago Black Hawks sign and another hit the organist as he played. By the end of the game, only one punt had been returned.

On one drive, the Spartans were in position to score when Glenn Presnell tripped on the field before he could reach the end zone. For the Bears, they employed a heavy run game with fullback Bronko Nagurski, though possessions ended after just three downs as Ralph Jones frequently elected to pooch kick. In the fourth quarter, the Bears scored on a controversial touchdown: Carl Brumbaugh handed the ball off to Nagurski, who pulled up and threw to Red Grange in the end zone for the score. Rules at the time mandated that a forward pass had to be thrown from at least five yards behind the line of scrimmage. The Spartans argued Nagurski did not drop back five yards before passing to Grange, but the touchdown stood. The Bears later scored a safety after the Spartans fumbled the ball out of their end zone.

== Officials ==
- Referee: Bobby Cahn
- Umpire: G.A. Brown
- Head linesman: Meyer Morris

== Legacy ==
Because it proved so popular, the 1932 NFL Playoff Game started a new era for the National Football League and for American football in general. Through 1932, the league had used the same rules as college football. Beginning with the 1933 season, the NFL introduced its own set of rules. The goal posts were moved from the end line back to the goal line (reversed in 1974), all plays started with the ball on or between the hash marks, and the forward pass became legal anywhere behind the line of scrimmage; ironically, the forward pass rule was supported by Spartans head coach George Clark, who quipped, "Nagurski would do it anyway!" Its biggest legacy, however, was the creation of the NFL Championship Game in 1933, the NFL's original championship game, a precursor to the Super Bowl.

NFL Commissioner Joseph Carr described the rule changes as providing better scoring opportunities, which he believed "would improve the game for both players and spectators." Carr had attended the Playoff Game, and kept a ticket stub from the game in his personal scrapbook.

In 1933, the NFL expanded to ten teams and divided into two divisions. The division winners met in a scheduled championship game to determine the NFL champion.

This game was the first time in which the NFL used an 80-yard field: the next occasion was 87 years later, when in 2019, the Raiders and Packers met at IG Field in Winnipeg for a preseason game. IG Field, home to the Winnipeg Blue Bombers of the Canadian Football League, normally has goal posts 110 yards apart. After the posts were moved for the NFL preseason game, the resulting divots in the field caused a safety hazard: to allow the game to go on, the game was played on a hastily shortened 80-yard field, with kickoffs eliminated and each team starting play at its own 15-yard line.

== See also ==
- Bears–Lions rivalry
