= 2007 NBA playoffs =

Postseason tournament

Tournament details
- Dates: April 21–June 14, 2007
- Season: 2006–07
- Teams: 16

Final positions
- Champions: San Antonio Spurs (4th title)
- Runners-up: Cleveland Cavaliers
- Semifinalists: Detroit Pistons; Utah Jazz

Tournament statistics
- Scoring leader(s): LeBron James (Cavaliers) (25.1 PPG)

Awards
- MVP: Tony Parker (Spurs)

The 2007 NBA playoffs was the postseason tournament of the National Basketball Association's 2006–07 season. The tournament concluded with the Western Conference champion San Antonio Spurs defeating the Eastern Conference champion Cleveland Cavaliers 4 games to 0 in the NBA Finals. Tony Parker was named NBA Finals MVP, making him the second Spur after Tim Duncan and the first European–born player to receive the award.

The Miami Heat were the defending champions, but lost to the Chicago Bulls in the first round by a sweep.

== Overview ==
The Dallas Mavericks entered their seventh consecutive postseason. In addition, the Mavericks started the playoffs with a league best 67–15 regular season record, the best in franchise history. The Mavericks also became the first team since 2000 to finish the regular season with 65+ wins. Their in-state rivals, the San Antonio Spurs, entered their tenth consecutive postseason.

The defending champion Miami Heat entered the playoffs for the fourth consecutive season. Despite winning their third consecutive Southeast Division title, the Heat opened the playoffs on the road against the Chicago Bulls (thanks to the Bulls’ 49–33 record versus the Heat's 44–38 record), marking the second consecutive postseason that a division winner opened the playoffs on the road. This was also Pat Riley's final NBA playoff appearance as a head coach, as the Heat would miss the playoffs the following season.

The Houston Rockets returned to the playoffs after a one-season absence, and opened the playoffs at home for the first time since 1997. This would also be Jeff Van Gundy's last postseason appearance as a head coach. Their first round opponent, the Northwest Division leading Utah Jazz made the playoffs for the first time since 2003. Like the Heat, the Jazz opened their postseason on the road.

The New Jersey Nets and the Detroit Pistons entered their sixth consecutive postseason.

The Denver Nuggets entered their fourth consecutive postseason.

The Washington Wizards, Chicago Bulls, and Phoenix Suns entered their third consecutive postseason.

The Los Angeles Lakers entered their second consecutive postseason.

The Golden State Warriors made the NBA Playoffs for the first time since 1994 NBA playoffs.

The Toronto Raptors made the playoffs for the first time since 2002 and earned home-court advantage for the first time in franchise history.

The Orlando Magic made the playoffs for the first time since 2003.

The Indiana Pacers missed the playoffs for the first time since 1997, while the Sacramento Kings missed the playoffs for the first time since 1998. This also marked the first of sixteen consecutive postseasons not to feature the Sacramento Kings.

=== First Round ===
The Nets–Raptors series was notable for Nets guard Vince Carter facing his former team, the Toronto Raptors. His New Jersey Nets won the series in six games, giving the Raptors their second consecutive first round exit. The Nets would not win another playoff series until 2014 as the Brooklyn Nets, which was also against the Raptors.

With their first round sweep of the Orlando Magic, the Detroit Pistons swept a playoff series for the first time since 1990. It was also the Pistons’ first sweep of a best of seven series since the 1989 NBA Finals.

With their first round sweep of the defending champion Miami Heat, the Chicago Bulls won their first playoff series since 1998 and swept a best of seven series for the first time since 1996. As of 2024, this was the Bulls’ most recent playoff sweep. With the loss, the Heat became the first defending champion in 50 seasons to be swept in the first round. In addition, the Heat were swept in a postseason series for the first time since 2001.

For the second consecutive postseason, the Phoenix Suns defeated the Los Angeles Lakers. The Suns would not win another playoff series against the Lakers until 2021.

With their shocking first round upset over the Dallas Mavericks, The Golden State Warriors became the third eighth seed to beat a top seed and the first team to do so since the first round was extended to a best of seven in 2003. The Warriors were also the first eighth seed to eliminate a top seed since the 1999 New York Knicks’ Cinderella run to the Finals. With the loss, the Dallas Mavericks earned the dubious distinction of becoming the first (and currently only) .800+ regular season team to lose in the first round. With the win, the Golden State Warriors also won their first playoff series since 1991. For Warriors head coach Don Nelson, he became the only head coach to win three playoff series as either a seventh or eighth seed, having also achieved the feat in 1989 and 1991.

With their first round series losses, the Miami Heat and Dallas Mavericks became the first NBA Finals pair to lose in the first round in the following year's playoffs. They also share the dubious distinction of being the second and third top seeds, respectively, to lose to an eighth seed in the first round in the NBA Playoffs.

The Jazz–Rockets series marked the eighth straight postseason in which at least one Game 7 was played. The Utah Jazz won over the Houston Rockets, giving the Jazz their first playoff series win since 2000 and the Rockets their fifth consecutive first round exit. This also marked the sole Game 7 of this season's playoffs.

=== Conference Semifinals ===
With the Heat and Mavericks eliminated in the first round, the Western Conference Semifinals series between the Phoenix Suns and San Antonio Spurs was considered “the real finals” as both teams had better records than the other remaining teams in the playoffs (thanks to the Suns’ 61–21 record and the Spurs’ 58–24 record, respectively).

The Detroit Pistons and Chicago Bulls met in the postseason for the first time since 1991, renewing the Bulls–Pistons rivalry.

Game 4 of the Suns–Spurs series was extremely notable thanks to Robert Horry's body-check on Steve Nash. Moments after his flagrant foul, Horry threw an elbow at Raja Bell's head. Horry was ejected and then suspended for two games. In addition, Amar’e Stoudemire and Boris Diaw were suspended, one game each, for leaving the bench during the altercation.

With their Western Conference Semifinals victory, the San Antonio Spurs won their third consecutive playoff series against the Phoenix Suns.

With their Western Conference Semifinals win over the Golden State Warriors, the Utah Jazz made the conference finals for the first time since 1998 (when they last made the NBA Finals). As of 2024, however, this was the most recent time the Jazz advanced past the Conference Semifinals. The Warriors themselves would not advance past the Conference Semifinals until 2015.

With their Eastern Conference Semifinals win against the New Jersey Nets, the Cleveland Cavaliers made their first Conference Finals appearance since 1992. In addition, Game 6 of the Cavaliers–Nets series was the final NBA Playoff game ever played in New Jersey, as well as the last NBA Playoff game ever played at Continental Airlines Arena. The Nets would not return to the playoffs until 2013 as the Brooklyn Nets.

With their Eastern Conference Semifinals victory over the Chicago Bulls, the Detroit Pistons made their fifth consecutive Eastern Conference Finals appearance. The Bulls, on the other hand, would not make the Eastern Conference Finals until 2011.

=== Conference Finals ===
Despite trailing 2–0 to the Detroit Pistons in the Eastern Conference Finals, the Cleveland Cavaliers won the series in six games to make their first ever NBA Finals appearance. Game 5 of the Pistons-Cavaliers series was extremely notable thanks to LeBron James scoring the Cavaliers’ final 25 points in a double-overtime thriller.

With their Western Conference Finals win over the Utah Jazz, the San Antonio Spurs made their fourth NBA Finals appearance, and their third of the 2000s decade.

=== NBA Finals ===
The 2007 NBA Finals was significant due to it being the finals debut for LeBron James. He would not return to the Finals until 2011 (as a member of the Miami Heat). Due to LeBron's inexperience versus the seasoned San Antonio Spurs, this season's NBA Finals produced the lowest ratings of any NBA Finals until 2020.

The San Antonio Spurs won their fourth NBA Championship with a four-game sweep of the Cleveland Cavaliers, the first finals sweep since 2002. The Spurs also became the second team to win three titles in the 2000s decade (the other being the Los Angeles Lakers, who won three straight titles from 2000 to 2002).

Tony Parker is the first European Player to win NBA Finals MVP, and the second member of the San Antonio Spurs to do so, the other being Tim Duncan.

After this series, the Spurs would not reach the NBA Finals until 2013 while the Cavaliers would not return until 2015.

== Seeding ==
The playoffs are conducted in 4 rounds of the best-of-7 series. The 3 division winners in each conference, along with the 5 best non-division winners, qualify for the playoffs. The division winners and top second-place team are seeded 1–4 based on record, with the remaining non-division winners are seeded 5–8 on record.

Until 2006, the division champions were guaranteed no worse than the third seed, while the non-division winners could do no better than the fourth seed regardless of record. This was the source of controversy in the 2006 NBA playoffs when the 63-win Spurs and 60-win Dallas Mavericks — the teams with the second-best and third-best records in the entire league—met in the conference semifinals. In response, the NBA changed the seeding system so that the teams with the two best records in the conference are guaranteed the top two seeds even if the second-best team isn't a division champion. Meanwhile, the division champions are guaranteed no worse than the fourth seed. This ensures that the teams with the two best records in the conference and possibly in the league cannot meet until the conference finals at the earliest.

== Playoff qualifying ==
=== Eastern Conference ===
The following teams clinched a playoff berth in the East:

1. Detroit Pistons (53–29, clinched Central division, best regular season record in Eastern Conference, and home court advantage throughout the Eastern Conference playoffs)
2. Cleveland Cavaliers (50–32)
3. Toronto Raptors (47–35, clinched Atlantic division)
4. Miami Heat (44–38, clinched Southeast division)
5. Chicago Bulls (49–33)
6. New Jersey Nets (41–41; 4–0 head-to-head vs. WSH)
7. Washington Wizards (41–41, 0–4 head-to-head vs. NJ)
8. Orlando Magic (40–42)

=== Western Conference ===
The following teams clinched a playoff berth in the West:

1. Dallas Mavericks (67–15, clinched Southwest division, best regular season record, and home court advantage throughout the playoffs)
2. Phoenix Suns (61–21, clinched Pacific division)
3. San Antonio Spurs (58–24)
4. Utah Jazz (51–31, clinched Northwest division)
5. Houston Rockets (52–30)
6. Denver Nuggets (45–37)
7. Los Angeles Lakers (42–40, 4–0 head-to-head vs. Golden State)
8. Golden State Warriors (42–40, 0–4 head-to-head vs. LA Lakers)

== Bracket ==
This is the bracket for the 2007 NBA Playoffs. Teams in italics had home court advantage. Teams in bold advanced to the next round. Numbers to the left of each team indicate the team's original seeding in their respective conferences. Numbers to the right of each team indicate the number of games the team won in that round. The division champions possess an asterisk (*).

First Round	Conference Semifinals
**E1**	**Detroit***	**4**
E8	Orlando	0
**E1**	**Detroit***	**4**
E5	Chicago	2
E4	Miami*	0
**E5**	**Chicago**	**4**
**Eastern Conference**
E3	Toronto*	2
**E6**	**New Jersey**	**4**
E6	New Jersey	2
**E2**	**Cleveland**	**4**
**E2**	**Cleveland**	**4**
E7	Washington	0
W1	Dallas*	2
**W8**	**Golden State**	**4**
W8	Golden State	1
**W4**	**Utah***	**4**
**W4**	**Utah***	**4**
W5	Houston	3
**Western Conference**
**W3**	**San Antonio**	**4**
W6	Denver	1
**W3**	**San Antonio**	**4**
W2	Phoenix*	2
**W2**	**Phoenix***	**4**
W7	LA Lakers	1

Conference Finals
E1	Detroit*	2
**E2**	**Cleveland**	**4**
W4	Utah*	1
**W3**	**San Antonio**	**4**

NBA Finals
E2	Cleveland	0
**W3**	**San Antonio**	**4**

- * Division winner
- **Bold** Series winner
- Italic Team with home-court advantage

=== Notes ===
- Houston and Chicago had home court advantage in the first round despite being lower seeds. Both teams had better regular season records than their opponents, but did not have the best record of the non-division-champion playoff teams in their respective conferences.

== First round ==
=== Eastern Conference first round ===
==== (1) Detroit Pistons vs. (8) Orlando Magic ====
ESPN

April 21
7:00 pm

Recap

Orlando Magic 92, Detroit Pistons 100
Scoring by quarter: 16–28, 27–23, 24–30, 25–19
Pts: Hedo Türkoğlu 17; Rebs: Dwight Howard 19; Asts: Grant Hill 5	Pts: Hamilton, Billups 22 each Rebs: Antonio McDyess 9 Asts: Chauncey Billups 11
Detroit leads series, 1–0

The Palace of Auburn Hills, Auburn Hills, Michigan
Attendance: 22,076
Referees: Bob Delaney, Joe Forte, David Jones

TNT

April 23
7:00 pm

Recap

Orlando Magic 90, Detroit Pistons 98
Scoring by quarter: 22–28, 22–19, 15–24, 31–27
Pts: Hedo Türkoğlu 22; Rebs: Dwight Howard 11; Asts: Hill, Arroyo 4 each	Pts: Richard Hamilton 22; Rebs: Rasheed Wallace 11; Asts: Chauncey Billups 8
Detroit leads series, 2–0

The Palace of Auburn Hills, Auburn Hills, Michigan
Attendance: 22,076
Referees: Tim Donaghy, Eddie Rush, Greg Willard

TNT

April 26
8:00 pm

Recap

Detroit Pistons 93, Orlando Magic 77
Scoring by quarter: 23–23, 25–19, 23–19, 22–16
Pts: Tayshaun Prince 23; Rebs: Antonio McDyess 11; Asts: Tayshaun Prince 5	Pts: Jameer Nelson 27; Rebs: Dwight Howard 12; Asts: Nelson, Türkoğlu 4 each
Detroit leads series, 3–0

Amway Arena, Orlando, Florida
Attendance: 17,451
Referees: Steve Javie, Jack Nies, Violet Palmer

TNT

April 28
3:00 pm

Recap

Detroit Pistons 97, Orlando Magic 93
Scoring by quarter: 22–25, 25–21, 26–21, 24–26
Pts: Chauncey Billups 25; Rebs: Chris Webber 10; Asts: Chauncey Billups 6	Pts: Dwight Howard 29; Rebs: Dwight Howard 17; Asts: Hedo Türkoğlu 5
Detroit wins series, 4–0

Amway Arena, Orlando, Florida
Attendance: 17,451
Referees: Tony Brothers, Monty McCutchen, Bennett Salvatore

Regular-season series
Detroit won 4–0 in the regular-season series

December 8, 2006

Recap

Detroit Pistons 87, Orlando Magic 83

Amway Arena, Orlando, Florida

February 21, 2007

Recap

Orlando Magic 88, Detroit Pistons 110

The Palace of Auburn Hills, Auburn Hills, Michigan

February 23, 2007

Recap

Detroit Pistons 94, Orlando Magic 89

Amway Arena, Orlando, Florida

April 11, 2007

Recap

Orlando Magic 99, Detroit Pistons 104

The Palace of Auburn Hills, Auburn Hills, Michigan

This was the third playoff meeting between these two teams, with each team winning one series apiece.

Previous playoff series
Tied 1–1 in all-time playoff series

1996

Detroit Pistons 0, Orlando Magic 3

1996 Eastern Conference First Round

2003

Detroit Pistons 4, Orlando Magic 3

2003 Eastern Conference First Round

The Orlando Magic's first playoff trip in 4 seasons was short lived as the top ranked Detroit Pistons dispatched the upstart Magic in 4 games. The Pistons recorded their first series sweep since sweeping Indiana in the first round of the 1990 NBA playoffs. The series was also the first time Orlando forward Grant Hill had appeared in the postseason since leaving Detroit after the 2000 season.

==== (2) Cleveland Cavaliers vs. (7) Washington Wizards ====
TNT

April 22
12:30 pm

Recap

Washington Wizards 82, Cleveland Cavaliers 97
Scoring by quarter: 20–27, 21–21, 26–26, 15–23
Pts: Antawn Jamison 28; Rebs: Antawn Jamison 14; Asts: Antonio Daniels 11	Pts: Larry Hughes 27; Rebs: Anderson Varejão 10; Asts: LeBron James 7
Cleveland leads series, 1–0

Quicken Loans Arena, Cleveland, Ohio
Attendance: 20,562
Referees: Joe DeRosa, Luis Grillo, Tom Washington

NBA TV

April 25
8:00 pm

Recap

Washington Wizards 102, Cleveland Cavaliers 109
Scoring by quarter: 23–23, 25–28, 15–24, 39–34
Pts: Antawn Jamison 31; Rebs: Antawn Jamison 10; Asts: Antonio Daniels 11	Pts: LeBron James 27; Rebs: Drew Gooden 14; Asts: LeBron James 7
Cleveland leads series, 2–0

Quicken Loans Arena, Cleveland, Ohio
Attendance: 20,562
Referees: Bernie Fryer, Derek Richardson, Greg Willard

TNT

April 28
5:30 pm

Recap

Cleveland Cavaliers 98, Washington Wizards 92
Scoring by quarter: 26–22, 35–22, 16–31, 21–17
Pts: LeBron James 30; Rebs: Drew Gooden 12; Asts: LeBron James 9	Pts: Antawn Jamison 38; Rebs: Antawn Jamison 11; Asts: Antonio Daniels 13
Cleveland leads series, 3–0

Verizon Center, Washington, D.C.
Attendance: 20,173
Referees: Steve Javie, Courtney Kirkland, Jack Nies

NBA TV

April 30
7:00 pm

Recap

Cleveland Cavaliers 97, Washington Wizards 90
Scoring by quarter: 22–23, 22–24, 22–20, 31–23
Pts: LeBron James 31; Rebs: Zydrunas Ilgauskas 19; Asts: LeBron James 7	Pts: Antawn Jamison 31; Rebs: Antonio Daniels 6 Asts: Antonio Daniels 12
Cleveland wins series, 4–0

Verizon Center, Washington, D.C.
Attendance: 20,173
Referees: Sean Corbin, Joe Forte, Bennett Salvatore

Regular-season series
Cleveland won 2–1 in the regular-season series

November 1, 2006

Recap

Washington Wizards 94, Cleveland Cavaliers 97

Quicken Loans Arena, Cleveland, Ohio

November 18, 2006

Recap

Cleveland Cavaliers 99, Washington Wizards 111

Verizon Center, Washington, D.C.

April 6, 2007

Recap

Cleveland Cavaliers 99, Washington Wizards 94

Verizon Center, Washington, D.C.

This was the fourth playoff meeting between these two teams, with the Cavaliers winning two of the first three meetings.

Previous playoff series
Cleveland leads 2–1 in all-time playoff series

1976

Cleveland Cavaliers 4, Washington Bullets 3

1976 Eastern Conference Semifinals

1977

Cleveland Cavaliers 1, Washington Bullets 2

1977 Eastern Conference First Round

2006

Cleveland Cavaliers 4, Washington Wizards 2

2006 Eastern Conference First Round

A rematch of the previous year's first round series was spoiled when Wizards stars Gilbert Arenas and Caron Butler were both forced out of the playoffs due to injuries received in the later parts of the regular season. Without Arenas and Butler, the Wizards were unable to stop LeBron James and the Cleveland Cavaliers from sweeping them out of the playoffs. It was Cleveland's first playoff sweep in franchise history.

==== (3) Toronto Raptors vs. (6) New Jersey Nets ====
ESPN

April 21
12:30 pm

Recap

New Jersey Nets 96, Toronto Raptors 91
Scoring by quarter: 23–22, 28–19, 27–24, 18–26
Pts: Richard Jefferson 28; Rebs: Jason Kidd 10; Asts: Jason Kidd 15	Pts: Chris Bosh 22; Rebs: Radoslav Nesterović 10; Asts: José Calderón 8
New Jersey leads series, 1–0

Air Canada Centre, Toronto, Ontario
Attendance: 20,330
Referees: Steve Javie, Scott Wall, Greg Willard

NBA TV

April 24
7:00 pm

Recap

New Jersey Nets 83, Toronto Raptors 89
Scoring by quarter: 12–14, 24–19, 27–25, 20–31
Pts: Vince Carter 19; Rebs: Carter, Kidd 11 each Asts: Jason Kidd 7	Pts: Anthony Parker 26; Rebs: Chris Bosh 13; Asts: T. J. Ford 6
Series tied, 1–1

Air Canada Centre, Toronto, Ontario
Attendance: 20,239
Referees: Tony Brothers, Joe DeRosa, Scott Foster

ESPN2

April 27
7:00 pm

Recap

Toronto Raptors 89, New Jersey Nets 102
Scoring by quarter: 19–31, 20–27, 29–21, 21–23
Pts: T. J. Ford 27; Rebs: Chris Bosh 11; Asts: T. J. Ford 8	Pts: Vince Carter 37; Rebs: Jason Kidd 16; Asts: Jason Kidd 19
New Jersey leads series, 2–1

Continental Airlines Arena, East Rutherford, New Jersey
Attendance: 17,147
Referees: Bernie Fryer, Tom Washington, Mark Wunderlich

TNT

April 29
7:30 pm

Recap

Toronto Raptors 81, New Jersey Nets 102
Scoring by quarter: 15–32, 22–24, 19–30, 25–16
Pts: Andrea Bargnani 16; Rebs: Chris Bosh 10; Asts: T. J. Ford 5	Pts: Vince Carter 27; Rebs: Jason Kidd 8 Asts: Jason Kidd 13
New Jersey leads series, 3–1

Continental Airlines Arena, East Rutherford, New Jersey
Attendance: 20,032
Referees: Dick Bavetta, David Jones, Ken Mauer

TNT

May 1
7:00 pm

Recap

New Jersey Nets 96, Toronto Raptors 98
Scoring by quarter: 13–33, 29–26, 25–20, 29–19
Pts: Vince Carter 30; Rebs: Mikki Moore 10; Asts: Jason Kidd 10	Pts: José Calderón 25; Rebs: Joey Graham 10; Asts: José Calderón 8
New Jersey leads series, 3–2

Air Canada Centre, Toronto, Ontario
Attendance: 20,511
Referees: Mike Callahan, Bob Delaney, Monty McCutchen

ESPN

May 4
8:00 pm

Recap

Toronto Raptors 97, New Jersey Nets 98
Scoring by quarter: 21–21, 25–22, 22–32, 29–23
Pts: Chris Bosh 23; Rebs: Morris Peterson 8 Asts: Chris Bosh 9	Pts: Richard Jefferson 24; Rebs: Kidd, Moore 8 each Asts: Jason Kidd 15
New Jersey wins series, 4–2

Continental Airlines Arena, East Rutherford, New Jersey
Attendance: 17,242
Referees: Jim Clark, Dan Crawford, Tim Donaghy

Regular-season series
Tied 2–2 in the regular-season series

November 1, 2006

Recap

Toronto Raptors 92, New Jersey Nets 102

Continental Airlines Arena, East Rutherford, New Jersey

December 15, 2006

Recap

New Jersey Nets 78, Toronto Raptors 90

Air Canada Centre, Toronto, Ontario

January 9, 2007

Recap

Toronto Raptors 86, New Jersey Nets 101

Continental Airlines Arena, East Rutherford, New Jersey

February 14, 2007

Recap

New Jersey Nets 109, Toronto Raptors 120

Air Canada Centre, Toronto, Ontario

This was the first playoff meeting between the Nets and the Raptors.

The Nets won the first round of the 2007 NBA Playoffs in their sixth straight appearance in the NBA Playoffs. The series was the only one in the Eastern Conference first round not to result in a sweep.

The series was notable for pitting ex-Raptor Vince Carter, who was traded to the Nets in 2004 after an acrimonious split, against his former team. So great was the Toronto crowd's disdain for Carter, that he was booed every time he touched the ball. The Nets took home court advantage in Game 1, holding off a late Raptors rally in the fourth quarter. The Raptors pulled away in Game 2 and tied the series at 1. When the series shifted to New Jersey, the Nets took charge of the series, winning Games 3 and 4 in routs. New Jersey had a chance to win the series in Game 5 in Toronto, but the Raptors took a 20-point lead after one quarter. Still, New Jersey managed to chip away, and had a chance to win it, but Boštjan Nachbar's 3 missed at the buzzer. Needing to win in New Jersey to force a Game 7, Toronto held a one-point lead with under a minute to play in Game 6, but Richard Jefferson hit a layup with 8 seconds left. Toronto attempted to try for the game-winning shot, but Jefferson intercepted the pass to seal the series for the Nets.

==== (4) Miami Heat vs. (5) Chicago Bulls ====
ABC

April 21
2:00 pm

Recap

Miami Heat 91, Chicago Bulls 96
Scoring by quarter: 28–27, 18–22, 16–23, 29–24
Pts: Dwyane Wade 21; Rebs: O'Neal, Haslem 6 each Asts: five players 3 each	Pts: Luol Deng 33; Rebs: Ben Wallace 14; Asts: Ben Gordon 11
Chicago leads series, 1–0

United Center, Chicago, Illinois
Attendance: 22,183
Referees: Monty McCutchen, Eddie Rush, Michael Smith

TNT

April 24
7:00 pm

Recap

Miami Heat 89, Chicago Bulls 107
Scoring by quarter: 21–31, 31–24, 19–30, 18–22
Pts: Dwyane Wade 21; Rebs: O'Neal, Posey 8 each Asts: Dwyane Wade 7	Pts: Ben Gordon 27; Rebs: Ben Gordon 7 Asts: Kirk Hinrich 8
Chicago leads series, 2–0

United Center, Chicago, Illinois
Attendance: 23,097
Referees: Luis Grillo, Steve Javie, Ken Mauer

ESPN

April 27
8:00 pm

Recap

Chicago Bulls 104, Miami Heat 96
Scoring by quarter: 29–23, 16–29, 27–24, 32–20
Pts: Ben Gordon 27; Rebs: Luol Deng 11; Asts: Kirk Hinrich 6	Pts: Dwyane Wade 28; Rebs: Shaquille O'Neal 13; Asts: Dwyane Wade 5
Chicago leads series, 3–0

American Airlines Arena, Miami
Attendance: 20,280
Referees: Luis Grillo, Steve Javie, Ken Mauer

ABC

April 29
1:00 pm

Recap

Chicago Bulls 92, Miami Heat 79
Scoring by quarter: 23–28, 21–20, 24–16, 24–15
Pts: Ben Gordon 24; Rebs: Luol Deng 12; Asts: Gordon, Hinrich 4 each	Pts: Dwyane Wade 24; Rebs: James Posey 18; Asts: Dwyane Wade 10
Chicago wins series, 4–0

American Airlines Arena, Miami, Florida
Attendance: 20,283
Referees: Bernie Fryer, Tom Washington, Mark Wunderlich

- Game 4 is Gary Payton's final NBA game.

Regular-season series
Chicago won 3–1 in the regular-season series

October 31, 2006

Recap

Chicago Bulls 108, Miami Heat 66

American Airlines Arena, Miami

December 27, 2006

Recap

Miami Heat 103, Chicago Bulls 109

United Center, Chicago, Illinois

January 27, 2007

Recap

Miami Heat 97, Chicago Bulls 100

United Center, Chicago, Illinois

March 7, 2007

Recap

Chicago Bulls 70, Miami Heat 103

American Airlines Arena, Miami

This was the fifth playoff meeting between these two teams, with the Bulls winning three of the first four meetings.

Previous playoff series
Chicago leads 3–1 in all-time playoff series

1992

Chicago Bulls 3, Miami Heat 0

1992 Eastern Conference First Round

1996

Chicago Bulls 3, Miami Heat 0

1996 Eastern Conference First Round

1997

Chicago Bulls 4, Miami Heat 1

1997 Eastern Conference Finals

2006

Chicago Bulls 2, Miami Heat 4

2006 Eastern Conference First Round

The Bulls won their first playoff series since the 1998 NBA Finals and the retirement of Michael Jordan. This was the Bulls first 4-game sweep, since sweeping the Magic in the 1996 Eastern Conference Finals. Meanwhile, Miami became the first defending champion since 1957 to be swept in the First Round the following season.

In addition, Southeast Division champions Miami and other division qualifiers Washington and Orlando were swept (0–12) by Chicago, Cleveland, Detroit respectively, all from the Central Division (12–0).

=== Western Conference first round ===
==== (1) Dallas Mavericks vs. (8) Golden State Warriors ====
TNT

April 22
8:30 pm

Recap

Golden State Warriors 97, Dallas Mavericks 85
Scoring by quarter: 23–17, 15–21, 34–28, 25–19
Pts: Baron Davis 33; Rebs: Baron Davis 14; Asts: Baron Davis 8	Pts: Josh Howard 21; Rebs: Josh Howard 13; Asts: Dirk Nowitzki 4
Golden State leads series, 1–0

American Airlines Center, Dallas
Attendance: 20,732
Referees: Dick Bavetta, Mike Callahan, Bill Kennedy

TNT

April 25
8:30 pm

Recap

Golden State Warriors 99, Dallas Mavericks 112
Scoring by quarter: 30–28, 22–26, 22–33, 25–25
Pts: Stephen Jackson 30; Rebs: Jason Richardson 10; Asts: Jason Richardson 3	Pts: Jason Terry 28; Rebs: Josh Howard 11; Asts: Harris, Stackhouse 4 each
Series tied, 1–1

American Airlines Center, Dallas, Texas
Attendance: 20,867
Referees: James Capers, Sean Corbin, Bennett Salvatore

ESPN

April 27
7:30 pm

Recap

Dallas Mavericks 91, Golden State Warriors 109
Scoring by quarter: 20–29, 28–32, 23–28, 20–20
Pts: Nowitzki, Howard 20 each Rebs: Dirk Nowitzki 12; Asts: Terry, Harris 5 each	Pts: Jason Richardson 30; Rebs: Andris Biedriņš 10; Asts: Stephen Jackson 6
Golden State leads series, 2–1

Oracle Arena, Oakland, California
Attendance: 20,629
Referees: Dan Crawford, Tim Donaghy, Joe Forte

TNT

April 29
7:00 pm

Recap

Dallas Mavericks 99, Golden State Warriors 103
Scoring by quarter: 27–21, 22–28, 28–28, 22–26
Pts: Dirk Nowitzki 23; Rebs: Dirk Nowitzki 15; Asts: Jason Terry 5	Pts: Baron Davis 33; Rebs: Baron Davis 8 Asts: Baron Davis 4
Golden State leads series, 3–1

Oracle Arena, Oakland, California
Attendance: 20,672
Referees: Joe DeRosa, Michael Smith, Derrick Stafford

TNT

May 1
8:30 pm

Recap

Golden State Warriors 112, Dallas Mavericks 118
Scoring by quarter: 28–38, 27–24, 32–28, 25–28
Pts: Baron Davis 27; Rebs: Mickaël Piétrus 10; Asts: Baron Davis 9	Pts: Dirk Nowitzki 30; Rebs: Dirk Nowitzki 12; Asts: Devin Harris 7
Golden State leads series, 3–2

American Airlines Center, Dallas, Texas
Attendance: 21,041
Referees: Jim Clark, Bernie Fryer, Ken Mauer

TNT

May 3
7:30 pm

Recap

Dallas Mavericks 86, Golden State Warriors 111
Scoring by quarter: 25–28, 23–22, 15–36, 23–25
Pts: Howard, Stackhouse 20 each Rebs: Dirk Nowitzki 10; Asts: Devin Harris 9	Pts: Stephen Jackson 33; Rebs: Andris Biedriņš 12; Asts: Matt Barnes 7
Golden State wins series, 4–2

Oracle Arena, Oakland, California
Attendance: 20,677
Referees: Ron Garretson, Steve Javie, Mark Wunderlich

Regular-season series
Golden State won 3–0 in the regular-season series

November 6, 2006

Recap

Golden State Warriors 107, Dallas Mavericks 104

American Airlines Center, Dallas

March 12, 2007

Recap

Dallas Mavericks 100, Golden State Warriors 117

Oracle Arena, Oakland, California

April 17, 2007

Recap

Dallas Mavericks 82, Golden State Warriors 111

Oracle Arena, Oakland, California

This was the first playoff meeting between the Mavericks and the Warriors.

The Warriors qualified for the playoffs for the first time since 1994, the second longest such streak in league history. However, the Warriors were heavy underdogs against the Dallas Mavericks despite sweeping the regular season series between the teams, as Dallas had one of the best records in NBA regular season history. Expectations of a short series were immediately dashed by Golden State's Game 1 victory in Dallas, behind guard Baron Davis and his rather frantic style of play. The Mavericks came back to win Game 2 to tie the series at 1.

But when the series shifted to Oakland for the next two games, a new X-factor emerged for the Warriors: their home crowd at the Oracle Arena. The electric crowd, which was the highest paid attendance crowd for an NBA game in the history of that arena, gave the Warriors a huge lift as they blew out Dallas in Game 3, and edged out a close victory in Game 4. As the series shifted back to Dallas, the top-ranked Mavericks found themselves one game from seeing their record breaking season end prematurely. The Mavericks gave their all and staved off elimination in Game 5, but had nothing left in Game 6 in Oakland. The Warriors used a third-quarter 18–0 run, sparked by Stephen Jackson's 13 straight points en route to a franchise playoff record seven 3-pointers, and an unexpected collapse from MVP candidate Dirk Nowitzki (2–13 from the field with 8 points) to finish Dallas and become the first #8 seed to win a best-of-7 series in the first round, and just the third overall in NBA history, following the Denver Nuggets in 1994 and the New York Knicks en route to the 1999 NBA Finals. The Warriors also won their first playoff series since 1991. The Mavericks also became the second team who had a 65+ winning record not to win a championship, the first being the 1972–73 Boston Celtics, and the most recent, the 2017-18 Houston Rockets. To date, they are the only ones who were eliminated in the first round.

Both 2006 NBA Finalists (Dallas and Miami) were eliminated in the first round despite being top 4 seeds. This was the first time since 1957 that this had happened. This would not happen again until 2021 when the NBA Finalists from the previous season (L.A. Lakers and Miami Heat) were eliminated in the first round as lower-seeded teams.

==== (2) Phoenix Suns vs. (7) Los Angeles Lakers ====
ABC

April 22
12:00 pm

Recap

Los Angeles Lakers 87, Phoenix Suns 95
Scoring by quarter: 23–18, 25–21, 29–35, 10–21
Pts: Kobe Bryant 39; Rebs: Lamar Odom 16; Asts: Luke Walton 6	Pts: Amar'e Stoudemire 23; Rebs: Shawn Marion 16; Asts: Steve Nash 10
Phoenix leads series, 1–0

US Airways Center, Phoenix, Arizona
Attendance: 18,422
Referees: Bernie Fryer, Ken Mauer, Leon Wood

TNT

April 24
7:30 pm

Recap

Los Angeles Lakers 98, Phoenix Suns 126
Scoring by quarter: 25–31, 22–37, 23–27, 28–31
Pts: Kobe Bryant 15; Rebs: Andrew Bynum 12; Asts: Kobe Bryant 5	Pts: Leandro Barbosa 26; Rebs: Shawn Marion 10; Asts: Steve Nash 14
Phoenix leads series, 2–0

US Airways Center, Phoenix, Arizona
Attendance: 18,422
Referees: Dick Bavetta, Marc Davis, Joe Forte

TNT

April 26
7:30 pm

Recap

Phoenix Suns 89, Los Angeles Lakers 95
Scoring by quarter: 31–17, 20–31, 19–26, 19–21
Pts: Amar'e Stoudemire 24; Rebs: Amar'e Stoudemire 10; Asts: Steve Nash 13	Pts: Kobe Bryant 45; Rebs: Lamar Odom 16; Asts: Kobe Bryant 6
Phoenix leads series, 2–1

Staples Center, Los Angeles
Attendance: 18,997
Referees: Mike Callahan, Bob Delaney, Derrick Stafford

ABC

April 29
12:30 pm

Recap

Phoenix Suns 113, Los Angeles Lakers 100
Scoring by quarter: 33–28, 25–23, 27–20, 28–29
Pts: Amar'e Stoudemire 27; Rebs: Amar'e Stoudemire 21; Asts: Steve Nash 23	Pts: Kobe Bryant 31; Rebs: Lamar Odom 19; Asts: Kobe Bryant 9
Phoenix leads series, 3–1

Staples Center, Los Angeles, California
Attendance: 18,997
Referees: Dan Crawford, Tim Donaghy, Ron Garretson

TNT

May 2
7:30 pm

Recap

Los Angeles Lakers 110, Phoenix Suns 119
Scoring by quarter: 23–32, 29–32, 33–27, 25–28
Pts: Kobe Bryant 34; Rebs: Odom, Turiaf 10 each Asts: Odom, Farmar 2 each	Pts: Shawn Marion 26; Rebs: Amar'e Stoudemire 16; Asts: Steve Nash 10
Phoenix wins series, 4–1

US Airways Center, Phoenix, Arizona
Attendance: 18,422
Referees: Scott Foster, Eddie Rush, Greg Willard

Regular-season series
Phoenix won 3–1 in the regular-season series

October 31, 2006

Recap

Phoenix Suns 106, Los Angeles Lakers 114

Staples Center, Los Angeles

March 4, 2007

Recap

Los Angeles Lakers 94, Phoenix Suns 99

US Airways Center, Phoenix, Arizona

April 8, 2007

Recap

Phoenix Suns 115, Los Angeles Lakers 107

Staples Center, Los Angeles

April 13, 2007

Recap

Los Angeles Lakers 85, Phoenix Suns 93

US Airways Center, Phoenix, Arizona

This was the 11th playoff meeting between these two teams, with the Lakers winning seven of the first ten meetings.

Previous playoff series
Los Angeles leads 7–3 in all-time playoff series

1970

Los Angeles Lakers 4, Phoenix Suns 3

1970 Western Division Semifinals

1980

Los Angeles Lakers 4, Phoenix Suns 1

1980 Western Conference Semifinals

1982

Los Angeles Lakers 4, Phoenix Suns 0

1982 Western Conference Semifinals

1984

Los Angeles Lakers 4, Phoenix Suns 2

1984 Western Conference Finals

1985

Los Angeles Lakers 3, Phoenix Suns 0

1985 Western Conference First Round

1989

Los Angeles Lakers 4, Phoenix Suns 0

1989 Western Conference Finals

1990

Los Angeles Lakers 1, Phoenix Suns 4

1990 Western Conference Semifinals

1993

Los Angeles Lakers 2, Phoenix Suns 3

1993 Western Conference First Round

2000

Los Angeles Lakers 4, Phoenix Suns 1

2000 Western Conference Semifinals

2006

Los Angeles Lakers 3, Phoenix Suns 4

2006 Western Conference First Round

Kobe Bryant and the Lakers went up against the high powered Phoenix Suns in a rematch of the previous year's first round series, which saw the Lakers take a 3–1 lead before the Suns took the series in 7. Unlike the previous series, the Suns had near complete control of the series, taking the series in 5. The Suns advanced to their third straight conference semifinals by eliminating the Lakers in the first round for the second straight year. In Game 4, Phoenix point guard Steve Nash made a run at the record for most assists in a playoff game, finishing one shy of the record 24 shared by Magic Johnson and John Stockton.

==== (3) San Antonio Spurs vs. (6) Denver Nuggets ====
TNT

April 22
6:00 pm

Recap

Denver Nuggets 95, San Antonio Spurs 89
Scoring by quarter: 21–16, 23–26, 23–24, 28–23
Pts: Allen Iverson 31; Rebs: Nenê 12; Asts: Allen Iverson 5	Pts: Tony Parker 19; Rebs: Tim Duncan 10; Asts: Tony Parker 8
Denver leads series, 1–0

AT&T Center, San Antonio
Attendance: 18,797
Referees: Ron Garretson, Jack Nies, Bennett Salvatore

TNT

April 25
6:00 pm

Recap

Denver Nuggets 88, San Antonio Spurs 97
Scoring by quarter: 18–24, 23–25, 19–25, 28–23
Pts: Carmelo Anthony 26; Rebs: Marcus Camby 18; Asts: Steve Blake 7	Pts: Tim Duncan 22; Rebs: Fabricio Oberto 10; Asts: Tony Parker 6
Series tied, 1–1

AT&T Center, San Antonio, Texas
Attendance: 18,797
Referees: Derrick Collins, Dan Crawford, Monty McCutchen

ESPN

April 28
6:00 pm

Recap

San Antonio Spurs 96, Denver Nuggets 91
Scoring by quarter: 22–25, 21–15, 32–27, 21–24
Pts: Tony Parker 21; Rebs: Tim Duncan 13; Asts: Tony Parker 6	Pts: Carmelo Anthony 28; Rebs: Carmelo Anthony 12; Asts: Steve Blake 7
San Antonio leads series, 2–1

Pepsi Center, Denver, Colorado
Attendance: 19,951
Referees: Mike Callahan, Bob Delaney, Scott Wall

TNT

April 30
8:30 pm

Recap

San Antonio Spurs 96, Denver Nuggets 89
Scoring by quarter: 20–27, 22–23, 25–23, 29–16
Pts: Tim Duncan 22; Rebs: Tim Duncan 11; Asts: Duncan, Ginóbili 6 each	Pts: Carmelo Anthony 29; Rebs: Marcus Camby 17; Asts: Allen Iverson 7
San Antonio leads series, 3–1

Pepsi Center, Denver, Colorado
Attendance: 19,644
Referees: Scott Foster, Bill Kennedy, Eddie Rush

TNT

May 2
7:00 pm

Recap

Denver Nuggets 78, San Antonio Spurs 93
Scoring by quarter: 21–25, 27–19, 11–19, 19–30
Pts: Iverson, Anthony 21 each Rebs: Marcus Camby 19; Asts: Allen Iverson 8	Pts: Michael Finley 26; Rebs: Tim Duncan 12; Asts: Tony Parker 10
San Antonio wins series, 4–1

AT&T Center, San Antonio, Texas
Attendance: 18,797
Referees: Sean Corbin, Joe DeRosa, Tom Washington

Regular-season series
San Antonio won 2–1 in the regular-season series

January 10, 2007

Recap

San Antonio Spurs 92, Denver Nuggets 83

Pepsi Center, Denver, Colorado

February 20, 2007

Recap

Denver Nuggets 80, San Antonio Spurs 95

AT&T Center, San Antonio

April 18, 2007

Recap

Denver Nuggets 100, San Antonio Spurs 77

AT&T Center, San Antonio

This was the sixth playoff meeting between these two teams, with the Spurs winning four of the first five meetings.

Previous playoff series
San Antonio leads 4–1 in all-time playoff series

1983

Denver Nuggets 1, San Antonio Spurs 4

1983 Western Conference Semifinals

1985

Denver Nuggets 3, San Antonio Spurs 2

1985 Western Conference First Round

1990

Denver Nuggets 0, San Antonio Spurs 3

1990 Western Conference First Round

1995

Denver Nuggets 0, San Antonio Spurs 3

1995 Western Conference First Round

2005

Denver Nuggets 1, San Antonio Spurs 4

2005 Western Conference First Round

The Nuggets duo of Carmelo Anthony and Allen Iverson got Denver off to a fast start, winning Game 1 and taking home-court advantage away from Tim Duncan and the Spurs. Despite the early letdown, the Spurs showed their championship mettle and bounced back for a 97–88 win in Game 2. In the pivotal Game 3, the Nuggets built an eight-point first-quarter lead before Manu Ginóbili's eight second-quarter points put San Antonio up 43–40 at halftime. A back-and-forth contest turned in the final 2:24 of the third quarter: Michael Finley hit two 3-pointers, and Robert Horry later hit a 3 that gave the Spurs a 75–67 lead at the end of the quarter. They hung on for a 96–91 win.

Denver started strong again in Game 4 and led by eight at halftime. But San Antonio stormed back after Anthony went to the bench in the third quarter with his fourth foul. The Spurs held a one-point lead with 30 seconds left when Horry, hit a 3 from the right corner to help seal a 96–89 win. The stunned Nuggets did not recover from the Game 4 letdown. Finley was the hero in Game 5, hitting a team-playoff-record eight threes for 26 points as San Antonio won 93–78 to end the series, marking the Nuggets' fourth straight season where they lost in the first round in five games. This is the second time in three seasons that the Nuggets lost the first-round series to the Spurs, after taking Game 1 in San Antonio (the first also happened in five games).

==== (4) Utah Jazz vs. (5) Houston Rockets ====
ESPN

April 21
8:30 pm

Recap

Utah Jazz 75, Houston Rockets 84
Scoring by quarter: 19–20, 23–13, 11–26, 22–25
Pts: Williams, Fisher 15 each Rebs: Carlos Boozer 12; Asts: Deron Williams 9	Pts: Yao Ming 28; Rebs: Yao Ming 13; Asts: Rafer Alston 8
Houston leads series, 1–0

Toyota Center, Houston, Texas
Attendance: 18,195
Referees: Ron Garretson, Jack Nies, Bennett Salvatore

TNT

April 23
8:30 pm

Recap

Utah Jazz 90, Houston Rockets 98
Scoring by quarter: 26–17, 15–22, 21–28, 28–31
Pts: Carlos Boozer 41; Rebs: Carlos Boozer 12; Asts: Deron Williams 7	Pts: Tracy McGrady 31; Rebs: Chuck Hayes 12; Asts: Alston, McGrady 5 each
Houston leads series, 2–0

Toyota Center, Houston, Texas
Attendance: 18,206
Referees: James Capers, Sean Corbin, Bob Delaney

NBA TV

April 26
7:00 pm

Recap

Houston Rockets 67, Utah Jazz 81
Scoring by quarter: 17–23, 25–25, 10–13, 15–20
Pts: Yao Ming 26; Rebs: Yao Ming 14; Asts: Rafer Alston 5	Pts: Carlos Boozer 22; Rebs: Carlos Boozer 12; Asts: Deron Williams 8
Houston leads series, 2–1

EnergySolutions Arena, Salt Lake City
Attendance: 19,911
Referees: Marc Davis, Joe DeRosa, Ron Garretson

ESPN

April 28
8:30 pm

Recap

Houston Rockets 85, Utah Jazz 98
Scoring by quarter: 21–19, 24–31, 17–33, 23–15
Pts: Yao Ming 20; Rebs: Alston, Yao 9 each Asts: Rafer Alston 6	Pts: Deron Williams 25; Rebs: Carlos Boozer 10; Asts: Deron Williams 7
Series tied, 2–2

EnergySolutions Arena, Salt Lake City, Utah
Attendance: 19,911
Referees: Scott Foster, Bill Kennedy, Eddie Rush

TNT

April 30
7:00 pm

Recap

Utah Jazz 92, Houston Rockets 96
Scoring by quarter: 23–21, 21–22, 28–25, 20–28
Pts: Carlos Boozer 26; Rebs: Mehmet Okur 9 Asts: Deron Williams 6	Pts: Tracy McGrady 26; Rebs: Yao Ming 15; Asts: Tracy McGrady 16
Houston leads series, 3–2

Toyota Center, Houston, Texas
Attendance: 18,314
Referees: Steve Javie, Courtney Kirkland, Jack Nies

TNT

May 3
6:00 pm

Recap

Houston Rockets 82, Utah Jazz 94
Scoring by quarter: 22–20, 21–26, 19–22, 20–26
Pts: Tracy McGrady 26; Rebs: Tracy McGrady 10; Asts: Shane Battier 4	Pts: Carlos Boozer 22; Rebs: Okur, Boozer 9 each Asts: Deron Williams 8
Series tied, 3–3

EnergySolutions Arena, Salt Lake City, Utah
Attendance: 19,911
Referees: Dick Bavetta, Joe Forte, Ken Mauer

TNT

May 5
8:30 pm

Recap

Utah Jazz 103, Houston Rockets 99
Scoring by quarter: 29–22, 24–21, 22–24, 28–32
Pts: Carlos Boozer 35; Rebs: Carlos Boozer 14; Asts: Deron Williams 14	Pts: McGrady, Yao 29 each Rebs: Juwan Howard 7 Asts: Tracy McGrady 13
Utah wins series, 4–3

Toyota Center, Houston, Texas
Attendance: 18,307
Referees: Mike Callahan, Bernie Fryer, Tom Washington

Regular-season series
Utah won 3–1 in the regular-season series

November 1, 2006

Recap

Houston Rockets 97, Utah Jazz 107

EnergySolutions Arena, Salt Lake City

January 5, 2007

Recap

Utah Jazz 86, Houston Rockets 100

Toyota Center, Houston, Texas

April 1, 2007

Recap

Utah Jazz 86, Houston Rockets 83

Toyota Center, Houston, Texas

April 18, 2007

Recap

Houston Rockets 91, Utah Jazz 101

EnergySolutions Arena, Salt Lake City

This was the sixth playoff meeting between these two teams, with the Jazz winning three of the first five meetings.

Previous playoff series
Utah leads 3–2 in all-time playoff series

1985

Houston Rockets 2, Utah Jazz 3

1985 Western Conference First Round

1994

Houston Rockets 4, Utah Jazz 1

1994 Western Conference Finals

1995

Houston Rockets 3, Utah Jazz 2

1995 Western Conference First Round

1997

Houston Rockets 2, Utah Jazz 4

1997 Western Conference Finals

1998

Houston Rockets 2, Utah Jazz 3

1998 Western Conference First Round

The resurgent Utah Jazz, fresh off one of their best seasons since the John Stockton/Karl Malone years, faced Yao Ming, Tracy McGrady and the Houston Rockets, who were seeking their first playoff series victory in 10 years. Home court advantage proved to be the key as the series progressed, as both the Rockets and the Jazz won closely contested matches in front of their home crowds.

As a result, the series had to go to a seventh and deciding game, which was played in Houston since the Rockets had the better record and thereby earned home court advantage, despite the division-winning Jazz being the higher-seeded team. Nevertheless, Utah overcame the Houston crowd and stunned the Rockets for the win on the road. The Jazz became only the third road team in history to win Game 7 of a seven-game series in which the home team won each of the first six games, after the Boston Celtics in the 1969 NBA Finals and the Baltimore Bullets in the 1971 Eastern Conference Finals. Houston's Tracy McGrady lost his sixth straight post-season series (out of 10 seasons) and has never played past the first round in his entire career.

After losing the series, the Rockets failed to reach a new contract agreement with their head coach Jeff Van Gundy, who was subsequently fired.

== Conference semifinals ==
=== Eastern Conference semifinals ===
==== (1) Detroit Pistons vs. (5) Chicago Bulls ====
TNT

May 5
7:00 pm

Recap

Chicago Bulls 69, Detroit Pistons 95
Scoring by quarter: 23–29, 18–25, 16–16, 12–25
Pts: Luol Deng 18; Rebs: B. Wallace, Deng 8 each Asts: Kirk Hinrich 6	Pts: Hamilton, Billups 20 each Rebs: Antonio McDyess 10; Asts: Lindsey Hunter 6
Detroit leads series, 1–0

The Palace of Auburn Hills, Auburn Hills, Michigan
Attendance: 22,076
Referees: Tony Brothers, Joe DeRosa, Bennett Salvatore

TNT

May 7
8:00 pm

Recap

Chicago Bulls 87, Detroit Pistons 108
Scoring by quarter: 18–34, 25–24, 19–25, 25–25
Pts: Tyrus Thomas 18; Rebs: Ben Wallace 7 Asts: Kirk Hinrich 7	Pts: Tayshaun Prince 25; Rebs: Richard Hamilton 9 Asts: Chauncey Billups 10
Detroit leads series, 2–0

The Palace of Auburn Hills, Auburn Hills, Michigan
Attendance: 22,076
Referees: Dick Bavetta, Joe Forte, Leon Wood

ESPN

May 10
8:00 pm

Recap

Detroit Pistons 81, Chicago Bulls 74
Scoring by quarter: 18–20, 10–24, 32–17, 21–13
Pts: Tayshaun Prince 23; Rebs: Prince, R. Wallace 11 each Asts: Chauncey Billups 7	Pts: Luol Deng 21; Rebs: Luol Deng 14; Asts: Kirk Hinrich 7
Detroit leads series, 3–0

United Center, Chicago, Illinois
Attendance: 23,462
Referees: Bernie Fryer, Ron Garretson, Tom Washington

ABC

May 13
2:30 pm

Recap

Detroit Pistons 87, Chicago Bulls 102
Scoring by quarter: 19–27, 24–23, 13–27, 31–25
Pts: Chauncey Billups 23; Rebs: Antonio McDyess 8 Asts: Chauncey Billups 8	Pts: Luol Deng 25; Rebs: Ben Wallace 17; Asts: Kirk Hinrich 10
Detroit leads series, 3–1

United Center, Chicago, Illinois
Attendance: 23,099
Referees: Dan Crawford, Ken Mauer, Monty McCutchen

TNT

May 15
8:00 pm

Recap

Chicago Bulls 108, Detroit Pistons 92
Scoring by quarter: 31–25, 28–26, 33–20, 16–21
Pts: Ben Gordon 28; Rebs: P. J. Brown 8 Asts: Kirk Hinrich 13	Pts: Chauncey Billups 17; Rebs: Chris Webber 8 Asts: Chauncey Billups 6
Detroit leads series, 3–2

The Palace of Auburn Hills, Auburn Hills, Michigan
Attendance: 22,076
Referees: Jim Clark, Luis Grillo, Eddie Rush

ESPN

May 17
7:00 pm

Recap

Detroit Pistons 95, Chicago Bulls 85
Scoring by quarter: 28–23, 15–25, 31–21, 21–16
Pts: Richard Hamilton 23; Rebs: Rasheed Wallace 13; Asts: Chauncey Billups 7	Pts: P. J. Brown 20; Rebs: Ben Wallace 7 Asts: Kirk Hinrich 11
Detroit wins series, 4–2

United Center, Chicago, Illinois
Attendance: 23,030
Referees: Sean Corbin, Jack Nies, Bennett Salvatore

Regular-season series
Chicago won 3–1 in the regular-season series

January 6, 2007

Recap

Detroit Pistons 89, Chicago Bulls 106

United Center, Chicago, Illinois

February 25, 2007

Recap

Chicago Bulls 93, Detroit Pistons 95

The Palace of Auburn Hills, Auburn Hills, Michigan

March 29, 2007

Recap

Detroit Pistons 81, Chicago Bulls 83

United Center, Chicago, Illinois

April 4, 2007

Recap

Chicago Bulls 106, Detroit Pistons 88

The Palace of Auburn Hills, Auburn Hills, Michigan

This was the sixth playoff meeting between these two teams, with the Pistons winning three of the first five meetings.

Previous playoff series
Detroit leads 3–2 in all-time playoff series

1974

Chicago Bulls 4, Detroit Pistons 3

1974 Western Conference Semifinals

1988

Chicago Bulls 1, Detroit Pistons 4

1988 Eastern Conference Semifinals

1989

Chicago Bulls 2, Detroit Pistons 4

1989 Eastern Conference Finals

1990

Chicago Bulls 3, Detroit Pistons 4

1990 Eastern Conference Finals

1991

Chicago Bulls 4, Detroit Pistons 0

1991 Eastern Conference Finals

In a renewal of a rivalry from the late '80s and early '90s, the Chicago Bulls and the Detroit Pistons faced off against each other. This was also the first time since 1995 that teams from the two cities met in a major league postseason or game. The series began fairly one-sided as the Pistons took Games 1 and 2 in Detroit in blowout fashion, followed by another convincing victory in Game 3 in Chicago. In all 3 games, the Bulls looked severely outmatched against the more experienced Pistons squad. Expectations were low for the Bulls, since no NBA team has ever won a seven-game series after being down 3–0. (It has only happened five times total in sports history, the 1942 Toronto Maple Leafs, 1975 New York Islanders, 2004 Boston Red Sox, 2010 Philadelphia Flyers and 2014 Los Angeles Kings.)

Despite the huge obstacle, the Bulls rallied to take Game 4 in a romp, and then proceeded to shock everyone with a blow-out victory in Detroit in Game 5. Despite the renewed momentum, the Pistons' playoff experience ultimately won out as they closed out the Bulls in a 95-85 Game 6 win. The Pistons advanced to the Eastern Conference Finals for the fifth straight year.

==== (2) Cleveland Cavaliers vs. (6) New Jersey Nets ====
ABC

May 6
1:00 pm

Recap

New Jersey Nets 77, Cleveland Cavaliers 81
Scoring by quarter: 20–23, 21–20, 18–16, 18–22
Pts: Vince Carter 21; Rebs: Vince Carter 13; Asts: Jason Kidd 9	Pts: LeBron James 21; Rebs: Gooden, Ilgauskas 14 each Asts: LeBron James 7
Cleveland leads series, 1–0

Quicken Loans Arena, Cleveland, Ohio
Attendance: 20,562
Referees: Luis Grillo, Steve Javie, Jack Nies

TNT

May 8
8:00 pm

Recap

New Jersey Nets 92, Cleveland Cavaliers 102
Scoring by quarter: 28–24, 17–24, 28–26, 19–28
Pts: Vince Carter 26; Rebs: Jason Kidd 10; Asts: Jason Kidd 8	Pts: LeBron James 36; Rebs: Drew Gooden 14; Asts: LeBron James 12
Cleveland leads series, 2–0

Quicken Loans Arena, Cleveland, Ohio
Attendance: 20,562
Referees: Ken Mauer, Bennett Salvatore, Michael Smith

ESPN

May 12
5:00 pm

Recap

Cleveland Cavaliers 85, New Jersey Nets 96
Scoring by quarter: 15–22, 28–23, 21–28, 21–23
Pts: Larry Hughes 23; Rebs: Zydrunas Ilgauskas 8 Asts: LeBron James 12	Pts: three players 23 each Rebs: Jason Kidd 13; Asts: Jason Kidd 14
Cleveland leads series, 2–1

Continental Airlines Arena, East Rutherford, New Jersey
Attendance: 20,032
Referees: Scott Foster, Bernie Fryer, Ron Garretson

TNT

May 14
7:00 pm

Recap

Cleveland Cavaliers 87, New Jersey Nets 85
Scoring by quarter: 19–20, 23–26, 29–23, 16–16
Pts: LeBron James 30; Rebs: Zydrunas Ilgauskas 11; Asts: LeBron James 7	Pts: Carter, Moore 25 each Rebs: Jason Kidd 17; Asts: Vince Carter 9
Cleveland leads series, 3–1

Continental Airlines Arena, East Rutherford, New Jersey
Attendance: 20,032
Referees: Dick Bavetta, Joe Forte, Mark Wunderlich

TNT

May 16
8:00 pm

Recap

New Jersey Nets 83, Cleveland Cavaliers 72
Scoring by quarter: 24–18, 23–21, 30–20, 6–13
Pts: Jason Kidd 20; Rebs: Jason Kidd 9 Asts: Vince Carter 10	Pts: LeBron James 20; Rebs: LeBron James 9 Asts: LeBron James 5
Cleveland leads series, 3–2

Quicken Loans Arena, Cleveland, Ohio
Attendance: 20,562
Referees: Mike Callahan, Dan Crawford, Bob Delaney

ESPN

May 18
7:00 pm

Recap

Cleveland Cavaliers 88, New Jersey Nets 72
Scoring by quarter: 32–15, 21–23, 8–22, 27–12
Pts: LeBron James 23; Rebs: LeBron James 8 Asts: LeBron James 8	Pts: Jason Kidd 19; Rebs: Jason Kidd 12; Asts: Jason Kidd 8
Cleveland wins series, 4–2

Continental Airlines Arena, East Rutherford, New Jersey
Attendance: 20,032
Referees: Jim Clark, Joe DeRosa, Eddie Rush

Regular-season series
Cleveland won 2–1 in the regular-season series

December 20, 2006

Recap

Cleveland Cavaliers 111, New Jersey Nets 113

Continental Airlines Arena, East Rutherford, New Jersey

January 6, 2007

Recap

New Jersey Nets 91, Cleveland Cavaliers 96

Quicken Loans Arena, Cleveland, Ohio

April 12, 2007

Recap

New Jersey Nets 76, Cleveland Cavaliers 94

Quicken Loans Arena, Cleveland, Ohio

This was the third playoff meeting between these two teams, with the Cavaliers winning the first two meetings.

Previous playoff series
Cleveland leads 2–0 in all-time playoff series

1992

Cleveland Cavaliers 3, New Jersey Nets 1

1992 Eastern Conference First Round

1993

Cleveland Cavaliers 3, New Jersey Nets 2

1993 Eastern Conference First Round

The Cavaliers advanced to the Eastern Conference Finals for the first time since 1992, while the Nets lost in the Conference Semifinals in three out of the last four years. Game 6 was the final playoff game at the Continental Airlines Arena, while also the last NBA playoff game ever played in New Jersey (the Prudential Center never hosted an NBA playoff game during the Nets' tenure from 2010 to 2012).

New Jersey Nets point guard Jason Kidd averaged a triple double the entire playoffs, scoring 14.6 points, grabbing 10.9 rebounds and dishing out 10.9 assists per game.

=== Western Conference semifinals ===
==== (2) Phoenix Suns vs. (3) San Antonio Spurs ====
ABC

May 6
12:30 pm

Recap

San Antonio Spurs 111, Phoenix Suns 106
Scoring by quarter: 27–26, 24–27, 26–22, 34–31
Pts: Tim Duncan 33; Rebs: Tim Duncan 16; Asts: Tony Parker 8	Pts: Steve Nash 31; Rebs: Amar'e Stoudemire 18; Asts: Steve Nash 8
San Antonio leads series, 1–0

US Airways Center, Phoenix, Arizona
Attendance: 18,422
Referees: James Capers, Bob Delaney, Mark Wunderlich

TNT

May 8
7:30 pm

Recap

San Antonio Spurs 81, Phoenix Suns 101
Scoring by quarter: 25–19, 17–30, 22–22, 17–30
Pts: Tim Duncan 29; Rebs: Tim Duncan 11; Asts: Manu Ginóbili 5	Pts: Amar'e Stoudemire 27; Rebs: Shawn Marion 10; Asts: Steve Nash 16
Series tied, 1–1

US Airways Center, Phoenix, Arizona
Attendance: 18,422
Referees: Jim Clark, Dan Crawford, Bill Kennedy

ABC

May 12
7:00 pm

Recap

Phoenix Suns 101, San Antonio Spurs 108
Scoring by quarter: 30–25, 23–30, 19–25, 29–28
Pts: Shawn Marion 26; Rebs: Kurt Thomas 12; Asts: Steve Nash 11	Pts: Tim Duncan 33; Rebs: Tim Duncan 19; Asts: Tony Parker 5
San Antonio leads series, 2–1

AT&T Center, San Antonio, Texas
Attendance: 18,797
Referees: Tim Donaghy, Eddie Rush, Greg Willard

TNT

May 14
8:30 pm

Recap

Phoenix Suns 104, San Antonio Spurs 98
Scoring by quarter: 24–22, 16–23, 32–35, 32–18
Pts: Amar'e Stoudemire 26; Rebs: Shawn Marion 12; Asts: Steve Nash 15	Pts: Tony Parker 23; Rebs: Tim Duncan 11; Asts: Tony Parker 7
Series tied, 2–2

AT&T Center, San Antonio, Texas
Attendance: 18,797
Referees: Joe DeRosa, Steve Javie, Jack Nies

TNT

May 16
7:30 pm

Recap

San Antonio Spurs 88, Phoenix Suns 85
Scoring by quarter: 13–24, 20–20, 23–18, 32–23
Pts: Manu Ginóbili 26; Rebs: Tim Duncan 12; Asts: Tony Parker 5	Pts: Shawn Marion 24; Rebs: Shawn Marion 17; Asts: Steve Nash 12
San Antonio leads series, 3–2

US Airways Center, Phoenix, Arizona
Attendance: 18,422
Referees: Bernie Fryer, Ron Garretson, Michael Smith

ESPN

May 18
9:30 pm

Recap

Phoenix Suns 106, San Antonio Spurs 114
Scoring by quarter: 23–23, 28–30, 16–28, 39–33
Pts: Amar'e Stoudemire 38; Rebs: Amar'e Stoudemire 12; Asts: Steve Nash 14	Pts: Manu Ginóbili 33; Rebs: Tim Duncan 13; Asts: Parker, Ginóbili 6 each
San Antonio wins series, 4–2

AT&T Center, San Antonio, Texas
Attendance: 18,797
Referees: Dick Bavetta, Joe Forte, Tom Washington

Regular-season series
San Antonio won 2–1 in the regular-season series

November 8, 2006

Recap

Phoenix Suns 106, San Antonio Spurs 111 (OT)

AT&T Center, San Antonio

February 1, 2007

Recap

San Antonio Spurs 87, Phoenix Suns 103

US Airways Center, Phoenix, Arizona

April 5, 2007

Recap

Phoenix Suns 85, San Antonio Spurs 92

AT&T Center, San Antonio

This was the eighth playoff meeting between these two teams, with the Spurs winning four of the first seven meetings.

Previous playoff series
San Antonio leads 4–3 in all-time playoff series

1992

Phoenix Suns 3, San Antonio Spurs 0

1992 Western Conference First Round

1993

Phoenix Suns 4, San Antonio Spurs 2

1993 Western Conference Semifinals

1996

Phoenix Suns 1, San Antonio Spurs 3

1996 Western Conference First Round

1998

Phoenix Suns 1, San Antonio Spurs 3

1998 Western Conference First Round

2000

Phoenix Suns 3, San Antonio Spurs 1

2000 Western Conference First Round

2003

Phoenix Suns 2, San Antonio Spurs 4

2003 Western Conference First Round

2005

Phoenix Suns 1, San Antonio Spurs 4

2005 Western Conference Finals

The highly anticipated match-up between the high-powered Phoenix Suns, led by 2-time MVP Steve Nash, and the San Antonio Spurs, led by 3-time Finals MVP Tim Duncan, had high expectations before the series tip-off. The Suns were looking to make the conference finals for the third straight year, and also looking for their first Finals berth since 1993. The Spurs on the other hand, were looking for their third trip in five years, and their fourth NBA title overall. The series received international interest with a playoff-record of 12 players originating outside the US. When the series ended, it had become one of the most hotly contested and controversial series in recent NBA history.

The Suns had their home court advantage quickly taken away as the Spurs took a tight Game 1, a game that saw Nash missing the final minutes for Phoenix due to a gash to his nose, which bled profusely. Nash and the Suns recovered to take Game 2 but after the game, Suns forward Amar'e Stoudemire accused the Spurs, especially Bruce Bowen and Manu Ginóbili, of being a dirty team. Despite the added scrutiny by the media circles, the Spurs won Game 3. The Suns, trying to overcome their recent failures against Texas teams in the playoffs, willed themselves to a come-from-behind victory in Game 4 to tie the series at 2.

However, the celebration was short-lived. In the closing minute of Game 4, with the Suns up 3, Nash brought up the ball and was body-checked into the press table by Robert Horry. Immediately following this, Amar'e Stoudemire and Boris Diaw stood up and went to check on their fallen teammate. As Horry was walking away, Raja Bell ran up to him, in defense of Nash, and was elbowed in the head. Horry was assessed a flagrant foul and then ejected. A technical foul was called on Bell. For his actions, Horry received a two-game suspension. Although they were not directly involved, Stoudemire and Diaw were suspended, one game each, for leaving the bench during an altercation. Severely undermanned, the Suns came into Game 5 with the task of beating the Spurs without their star big man.

Although the Suns were able to control most of the game without the suspended players, even taking a 16-point lead on the Spurs at one point, the Spurs came back to win an incredibly close Game 5. Diaw and Stoudemire did return for the Suns in Game 6, though that didn't help the Suns to force a Game 7 and the Spurs eliminated them to advance to the Western Conference Finals with a 114–106 win.

==== (4) Utah Jazz vs. (8) Golden State Warriors ====
TNT

May 7
8:30 pm

Recap

Golden State Warriors 112, Utah Jazz 116
Scoring by quarter: 35–37, 31–26, 23–21, 23–32
Pts: Baron Davis 24; Rebs: Barnes, Richardson 10 each Asts: Baron Davis 7	Pts: Deron Williams 31; Rebs: Carlos Boozer 20; Asts: Deron Williams 8
Utah leads series, 1–0

EnergySolutions Arena, Salt Lake City
Attendance: 19,911
Referees: Monty McCutchen, Eddie Rush, Greg Willard

TNT

May 9
7:00 pm

Recap

Golden State Warriors 117, Utah Jazz 127 (OT)
Scoring by quarter: 31–28, 27–35, 31–27, 24–23, Overtime: 4–14
Pts: Baron Davis 36; Rebs: Matt Barnes 7 Asts: Baron Davis 7	Pts: Carlos Boozer 30; Rebs: Mehmet Okur 18; Asts: Deron Williams 14
Utah leads series, 2–0

EnergySolutions Arena, Salt Lake City, Utah
Attendance: 19,911
Referees: Joe DeRosa, Scott Foster, Steve Javie

ESPN

May 11
6:00 pm

Recap

Utah Jazz 105, Golden State Warriors 125
Scoring by quarter: 27–30, 22–40, 36–34, 20–21
Pts: Carlos Boozer 19; Rebs: Carlos Boozer 11; Asts: Deron Williams 6	Pts: Baron Davis 32; Rebs: Andris Biedriņš 13; Asts: Baron Davis 9
Utah leads series, 2–1

Oracle Arena, Oakland, California
Attendance: 20,655
Referees: Dick Bavetta, Jim Clark, Sean Corbin

TNT

May 13
6:00 pm

Recap

Utah Jazz 115, Golden State Warriors 101
Scoring by quarter: 25–23, 25–26, 25–29, 40–23
Pts: Carlos Boozer 34; Rebs: Carlos Boozer 12; Asts: Deron Williams 13	Pts: Jackson, Harrington 24 each Rebs: Andris Biedriņš 10; Asts: Baron Davis 7
Utah leads series, 3–1

Oracle Arena, Oakland, California
Attendance: 20,679
Referees: Tony Brothers, Mike Callahan, Tom Washington

TNT

May 15
8:30 pm

Recap

Golden State Warriors 87, Utah Jazz 100
Scoring by quarter: 32–29, 22–23, 19–25, 14–23
Pts: Baron Davis 21; Rebs: Jason Richardson 8 Asts: Baron Davis 8	Pts: Boozer, Kirilenko 21 each Rebs: Carlos Boozer 14; Asts: Deron Williams 7
Utah wins series, 4–1

EnergySolutions Arena, Salt Lake City, Utah
Attendance: 19,911
Referees: James Capers, Ken Mauer, Bennett Salvatore

Regular-season series
Tied 2–2 in the regular-season series

November 4, 2006

Recap

Golden State Warriors 82, Utah Jazz 106

EnergySolutions Arena, Salt Lake City

November 25, 2006

Recap

Utah Jazz 78, Golden State Warriors 91

Oracle Arena, Oakland, California

March 20, 2007

Recap

Golden State Warriors 100, Utah Jazz 104

EnergySolutions Arena, Salt Lake City

April 9, 2007

Recap

Utah Jazz 102, Golden State Warriors 126

Oracle Arena, Oakland, California

This was the third playoff meeting between these two teams, with the Warriors winning the first two meetings.

Previous playoff series
Golden State leads 2–0 in all-time playoff series

1987

Golden State Warriors 3, Utah Jazz 2

1987 Western Conference First Round

1989

Golden State Warriors 3, Utah Jazz 0

1989 Western Conference First Round

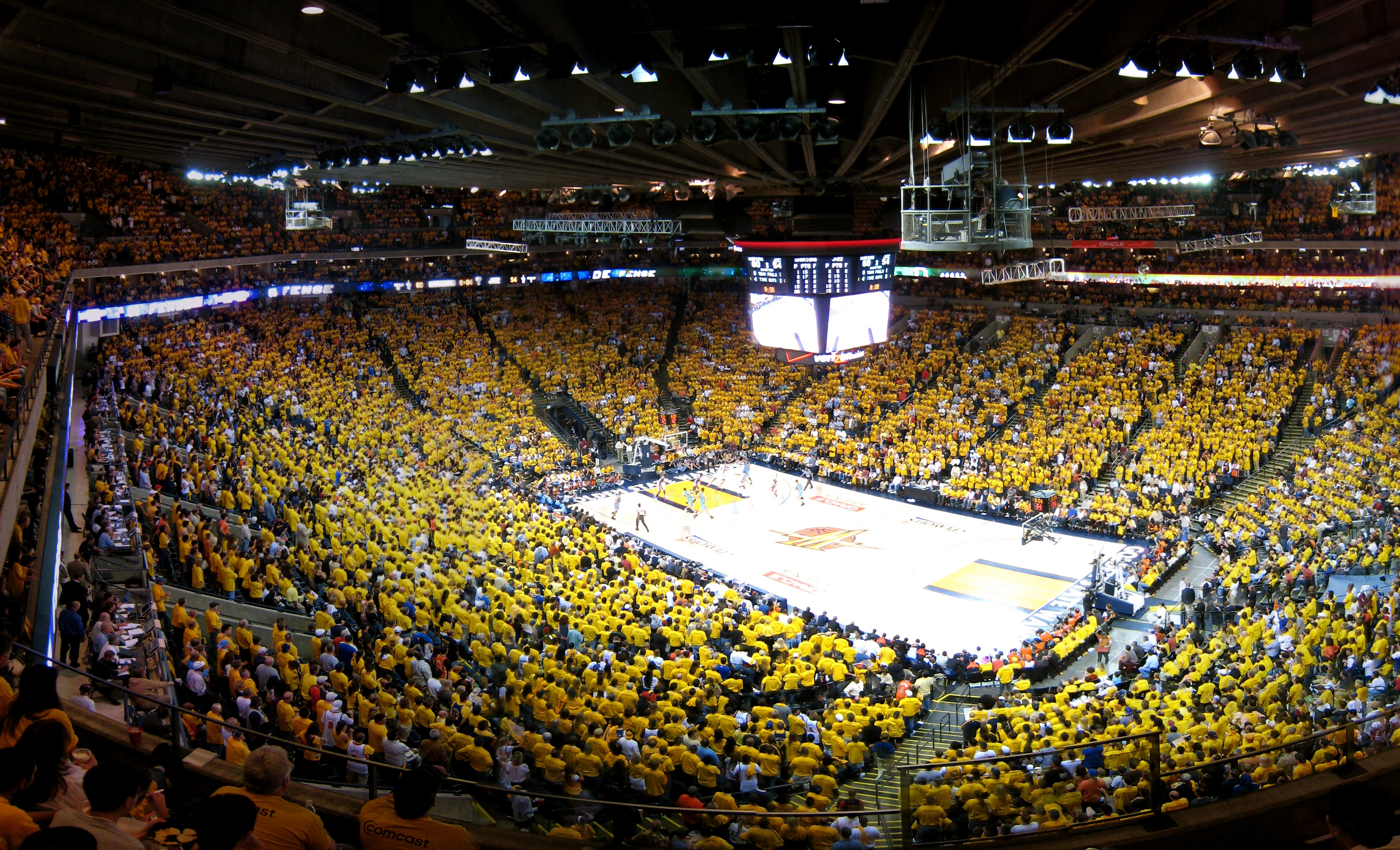
The Warriors play the Jazz at Oracle Arena in Game 3.

Fresh off their stunning upset of the top-seeded Dallas Mavericks, the Golden State Warriors faced a very different team in Utah. The Warriors continued the frantic style of play they exhibited against the Mavericks, but the Jazz, a more defensive-minded team, managed to shut them down to take Game 1. The Warriors tried to bounce back in Game 2, and took the Jazz to overtime. But the Jazz were able to prevail, due to the inspired clutch play of guard Derek Fisher, who arrived at halftime after being with his family in New York City because of his daughter's emergency eye cancer surgery.

The series shifted back to Oakland and the raucous Oracle Arena crowd, which lifted the Warriors to a resounding blowout in Game 3, a game which saw the Warriors hit a playoff record 11 threes in the first half. However, the Jazz shrugged off the crowd and handed the Warriors their only playoff home loss of the year in Game 4. The Warriors' playoff run ended as the Jazz finished them off in Game 5. The Jazz advanced to the Western Conference Finals for the first time since 1998.

== Conference finals ==
=== Eastern Conference finals ===
==== (1) Detroit Pistons vs. (2) Cleveland Cavaliers ====
TNT

May 21
8:00 pm

Recap

Cleveland Cavaliers 76, Detroit Pistons 79
Scoring by quarter: 24–19, 17–16, 14–21, 21–23
Pts: Zydrunas Ilgauskas 22; Rebs: Zydrunas Ilgauskas 13; Asts: LeBron James 9	Pts: Richard Hamilton 24; Rebs: Rasheed Wallace 12; Asts: Tayshaun Prince 9
Detroit leads series, 1–0

The Palace of Auburn Hills, Auburn Hills, Michigan
Attendance: 22,076
Referees: Steve Javie, Ken Mauer, Greg Willard

TNT

May 24
8:00 pm

Recap

Cleveland Cavaliers 76, Detroit Pistons 79
Scoring by quarter: 16–20, 34–18, 13–22, 13–19
Pts: LeBron James 19; Rebs: Anderson Varejão 14; Asts: LeBron James 7	Pts: Rasheed Wallace 16; Rebs: Rasheed Wallace 11; Asts: Chauncey Billups 6
Detroit leads series, 2–0

The Palace of Auburn Hills, Auburn Hills, Michigan
Attendance: 22,076
Referees: Jim Clark, Bernie Fryer, Mark Wunderlich

TNT

May 27
8:30 pm

Recap

Detroit Pistons 82, Cleveland Cavaliers 88
Scoring by quarter: 22–22, 21–24, 20–16, 19–26
Pts: Rasheed Wallace 16; Rebs: Antonio McDyess 9 Asts: three players 3 each	Pts: LeBron James 32; Rebs: LeBron James 9 Asts: LeBron James 9
Detroit leads series, 2–1

Quicken Loans Arena, Cleveland, Ohio
Attendance: 20,562
Referees: Dick Bavetta, Scott Foster, Tom Washington

TNT

May 29
8:00 pm

Recap

Detroit Pistons 87, Cleveland Cavaliers 91
Scoring by quarter: 22–26, 21–24, 24–15, 20–26
Pts: Chauncey Billups 23; Rebs: Chauncey Billups 9 Asts: Tayshaun Prince 4	Pts: LeBron James 25; Rebs: Drew Gooden 8 Asts: LeBron James 11
Series tied, 2–2

Quicken Loans Arena, Cleveland, Ohio
Attendance: 20,562
Referees: Mike Callahan, Dan Crawford, Joe Forte

TNT

May 31
8:00 pm

Recap

Cleveland Cavaliers 109, Detroit Pistons 107 (2OT)
Scoring by quarter: 23–29, 28–23, 19–18, 21–21, Overtime: 9–9, 9–7
Pts: LeBron James 48; Rebs: Zydrunas Ilgauskas 16; Asts: LeBron James 7	Pts: Richard Hamilton 26; Rebs: Tayshaun Prince 9 Asts: Richard Hamilton 5
Cleveland leads series, 3–2

The Palace of Auburn Hills, Auburn Hills, Michigan
Attendance: 22,076
Referees: Bob Delaney, Ron Garretson, Bennett Salvatore

TNT

June 2
8:30 pm

Recap

Detroit Pistons 82, Cleveland Cavaliers 98
Scoring by quarter: 21–27, 27–21, 18–19, 16–31
Pts: Richard Hamilton 29; Rebs: three players 6 each Asts: Tayshaun Prince 6	Pts: Daniel Gibson 31; Rebs: LeBron James 14; Asts: LeBron James 8
Cleveland wins series, 4–2

Quicken Loans Arena, Cleveland, Ohio
Attendance: 20,562
Referees: Joe DeRosa, Jack Nies, Eddie Rush

Regular-season series
Detroit won 3–1 in the regular-season series

December 21, 2006

Recap

Detroit Pistons 87, Cleveland Cavaliers 71

Quicken Loans Arena, Cleveland, Ohio

February 4, 2007

Recap

Detroit Pistons 90, Cleveland Cavaliers 78

Quicken Loans Arena, Cleveland, Ohio

March 7, 2007

Recap

Cleveland Cavaliers 101, Detroit Pistons 97 (OT)

The Palace of Auburn Hills, Auburn Hills, Michigan

April 8, 2007

Recap

Cleveland Cavaliers 82, Detroit Pistons 87

The Palace of Auburn Hills, Auburn Hills, Michigan

This was the second playoff meeting between these two teams, with the Pistons winning the first meeting.

Previous playoff series
Detroit leads 1–0 in all-time playoff series

2006

Cleveland Cavaliers 3, Detroit Pistons 4

2006 Eastern Conference Semifinals

In a rematch of the thrilling 2006 second-round series, the Pistons and Cavaliers matched up was a closely contested series in NBA history, with the first five games being decided by six points or less. The spotlight fell on LeBron James. Despite gaining some momentum in the opening games of the series against the experienced Pistons, key last-second decisions by James led to Cleveland losses in Games 1 and 2 in Detroit, by identical scores, in which Cleveland led for most of the two games. They faced a 0–2 deficit for the second straight year, but would be acknowledged from the year before that they could win three straight games to get back into the series.

With media circles on his back for his complacency in these games (James had a then playoff career low 10 points in Game 1), James came back to will the Cavs to close victories in Games 3 and 4 in Cleveland, evening the series at 2. The series shifted back to Detroit for a Game 5 that proved to be one of the most memorable postseason games in recent NBA history. In a match that went into double overtime, the Cavaliers stunned the Pistons on their home court, thanks to LeBron James' playoff career-high 48-point performance. James scored the Cavaliers' final 25 points, including all 18 points in overtime, forced the second OT with a driving dunk and made a driving layup with 2.2 seconds left in the second OT to silence the Palace crowd. A game tying buzzer beater by Chauncey Billups rimmed out making it two straight 2-point wins at the Palace in Game 5.

The Cavaliers took advantage of their home court in 2007 and exploded in Game 6 to close out the Pistons, and to clinch the franchise's first trip to the NBA Finals (in the process denying a rematch of the 2005 NBA Finals between the Pistons and Spurs). Rookie Daniel Gibson scored a career-high 31 points, including five 3-pointers, to lift the Cavs in the second half behind a roaring home crowd.

Detroit would lose a record-tying 12 consecutive postseason games against Cleveland, a drought that did not end until the 2026 Eastern Conference Semifinals.

=== Western Conference finals ===
==== (3) San Antonio Spurs vs. (4) Utah Jazz ====
ABC

May 20
2:30 pm

Recap

Utah Jazz 100, San Antonio Spurs 108
Scoring by quarter: 20–23, 16–31, 26–24, 38–30
Pts: Deron Williams 34; Rebs: Carlos Boozer 12; Asts: Deron Williams 9	Pts: Tim Duncan 27; Rebs: Tim Duncan 10; Asts: Manu Ginóbili 10
San Antonio leads series, 1–0

AT&T Center, San Antonio
Attendance: 18,300
Referees: Mike Callahan, Dan Crawford, Ron Garretson

ESPN

May 22
8:00 pm

Recap

Utah Jazz 96, San Antonio Spurs 105
Scoring by quarter: 24–26, 17–32, 24–23, 31–24
Pts: Carlos Boozer 33; Rebs: Carlos Boozer 15; Asts: Deron Williams 10	Pts: Tim Duncan 26; Rebs: Tim Duncan 14; Asts: Tony Parker 14
San Antonio leads series, 2–0

AT&T Center, San Antonio, Texas
Attendance: 18,797
Referees: Sean Corbin, Jack Nies, Bennett Salvatore

ABC

May 26
6:30 pm

Recap

San Antonio Spurs 83, Utah Jazz 109
Scoring by quarter: 23–15, 24–28, 20–32, 16–34
Pts: Tony Parker 25; Rebs: Tim Duncan 8 Asts: Tony Parker 7	Pts: Deron Williams 31; Rebs: Carlos Boozer 12; Asts: Deron Williams 8
San Antonio leads series, 2–1

EnergySolutions Arena, Salt Lake City
Attendance: 19,911
Referees: Bob Delaney, Monty McCutchen, Eddie Rush

ESPN

May 28
7:00 pm

Recap

San Antonio Spurs 91, Utah Jazz 79
Scoring by quarter: 21–20, 29–22, 13–20, 28–17
Pts: Manu Ginóbili 22; Rebs: Fabricio Oberto 11; Asts: Jacque Vaughn 4	Pts: Deron Williams 27; Rebs: Carlos Boozer 9 Asts: Deron Williams 10
San Antonio leads series, 3–1

EnergySolutions Arena, Salt Lake City, Utah
Attendance: 19,911
Referees: Steve Javie, Joe DeRosa, Ken Mauer

ESPN

May 30
8:00 pm

Recap

Utah Jazz 84, San Antonio Spurs 109
Scoring by quarter: 15–34, 24–21, 17–28, 28–26
Pts: Andrei Kirilenko 13; Rebs: Carlos Boozer 12; Asts: Carlos Boozer 4	Pts: Duncan, Parker 21 each Rebs: Fabricio Oberto 10; Asts: Jacque Vaughn 6
San Antonio wins series, 4–1

AT&T Center, San Antonio, Texas
Attendance: 18,797
Referees: Bernie Fryer, Tom Washington, Greg Willard

Regular-season series
Tied 2–2 in the regular-season series

November 29, 2006

Recap

San Antonio Spurs 75, Utah Jazz 83

EnergySolutions Arena, Salt Lake City

December 28, 2006

Recap

Utah Jazz 83, San Antonio Spurs 106

AT&T Center, San Antonio

January 31, 2007

Recap

San Antonio Spurs 93, Utah Jazz 97

EnergySolutions Arena, Salt Lake City

March 30, 2007

Recap

Utah Jazz 93, San Antonio Spurs 102

AT&T Center, San Antonio

This was the fourth playoff meeting between these two teams, with the Jazz winning the first three meetings.

Previous playoff series
Utah leads 3–0 in all-time playoff series

1994

San Antonio Spurs 1, Utah Jazz 3

1994 Western Conference First Round

1996

San Antonio Spurs 2, Utah Jazz 4

1996 Western Conference Semifinals

1998

San Antonio Spurs 1, Utah Jazz 4

1998 Western Conference Semifinals

For the first time since 1990, neither the #1 nor #2 seed participated in the Western Conference Finals. However, the series pitted youth against experience as the up-and-coming Utah Jazz faced off against the seasoned San Antonio Spurs. Coming into the series, the Jazz were not given much of a chance due to their inexperience. However, Carlos Boozer, Deron Williams and the Jazz were able to hold their own against San Antonio for a good part of the series.

Unfortunately, it was not enough. The series' first 2 games – both San Antonio home victories – saw the Spurs blow big first-half leads and the Jazz mount last-gasp rallies that were thwarted by San Antonio's clutch shooting. When the Spurs' 19-point first-half lead dwindled to 95-87 late in the fourth quarter of Game 1, Tim Duncan, Tony Parker, Manu Ginóbili came through with timely shots down the stretch. When San Antonio's 22-point edge shrank to 83-76 late in Game 2, Bruce Bowen broke Utah's rhythm with a 3 from the left corner and another from the right to end the threat.

The Jazz, who were undefeated at home in the postseason coming into the series, had their most cohesive effort in a 109-83 Game 3 rout. Utah pestered Duncan into early foul trouble and got baskets from players other than Williams and Boozer, who had combined for 57.7% of their team's points through the first two games. But Jazz fans' euphoria over the team's only series victory gave way to frustration in Game 4 – with most of it aimed at Ginóbili and his flopping. 11 of his 16 fourth-quarter points came at the foul line in an ugly overall team performance in which the Spurs made more free throws (30) than field goals (28). Contributing to that discrepancy were four technical fouls called against Utah in the fourth. The subsequent ejections of Utah head coach Jerry Sloan and Jazz guard Derek Fisher had a charged-up EnergySolutions Arena crowd raining debris onto the court in protest.

The unflappable Spurs responded with yet another commanding start in Game 5. They outscored the Jazz by 19 in the first quarter and led by as many as 29. Not even another late-game arrival of Fisher (from New York again) could help the Jazz enough and the Spurs won a 109–84 series-clinching victory and an eventual date in the NBA Finals with the Cavaliers.

== NBA Finals: (W3) San Antonio Spurs vs. (E2) Cleveland Cavaliers ==
ABC

June 7
8:00 pm

Recap

Cleveland Cavaliers 76, San Antonio Spurs 85
Scoring by quarter: 15–20, 20–20, 14–24, 27–21
Pts: Daniel Gibson 16; Rebs: LeBron James 7 Asts: James, Gibson 4 each	Pts: Tony Parker 27; Rebs: Tim Duncan 13; Asts: Tony Parker 7
San Antonio leads series, 1–0

AT&T Center, San Antonio, Texas
Attendance: 18,797
Referees: Mike Callahan, Steve Javie, Ken Mauer

ABC

June 10
8:00 pm

Recap

Cleveland Cavaliers 92, San Antonio Spurs 103
Scoring by quarter: 17–28, 16–30, 29–31, 30–14
Pts: LeBron James 25; Rebs: Anderson Varejão 10; Asts: LeBron James 6	Pts: Tony Parker 30; Rebs: Duncan, Horry 9 each Asts: Tim Duncan 8
San Antonio leads series, 2–0

AT&T Center, San Antonio, Texas
Attendance: 18,797
Referees: Dick Bavetta, Jim Clark, Joe DeRosa

ABC

June 12
9:00 pm

Recap

San Antonio Spurs 75, Cleveland Cavaliers 72
Scoring by quarter: 16–18, 24–20, 15–12, 20–22
Pts: Tony Parker 17; Rebs: Bowen, Duncan 9 each Asts: Manu Ginóbili 5	Pts: LeBron James 25; Rebs: Zydrunas Ilgauskas 18; Asts: LeBron James 7
San Antonio leads series, 3–0

Quicken Loans Arena, Cleveland, Ohio
Attendance: 20,562
Referees: Dan Crawford, Bob Delaney, Bernie Fryer

ABC

June 14
9:00 pm

Recap

San Antonio Spurs 83, Cleveland Cavaliers 82
Scoring by quarter: 19–20, 20–14, 21–18, 23–30
Pts: Manu Ginóbili 27; Rebs: Tim Duncan 15; Asts: three players 3 each	Pts: LeBron James 24; Rebs: Zydrunas Ilgauskas 13; Asts: LeBron James 10
San Antonio wins series 4–0

Quicken Loans Arena, Cleveland, Ohio
Attendance: 20,562
Referees: Joe Forte, Eddie Rush, Bennett Salvatore

Regular-season series
Cleveland won 2–0 in the regular-season series

November 3, 2006

Recap

Cleveland Cavaliers 88, San Antonio Spurs 81

AT&T Center, San Antonio, Texas

January 2, 2007

Recap

San Antonio Spurs 78, Cleveland Cavaliers 82

Quicken Loans Arena, Cleveland, Ohio

This was the first playoff meeting between the Cavaliers and the Spurs.

The Cavaliers, led by superstar LeBron James, entered the 2007 Finals looking for their first franchise championship, as well as the first championship for a pro team based out of Cleveland since the Cleveland Browns won the 1964 National Football League Championship. However, the Cavs were considered heavy underdogs against the 3-time champion Spurs. The Spurs' veteran leadership and championship experience overwhelmed the Cavs, who were swept by the Spurs after two blowouts in San Antonio and two close games in Cleveland.

== Statistic leaders ==
Category	High			Average			
Category	Player	Team	Total	Player	Team	Avg.	Games played
Points	LeBron James	Cleveland Cavaliers	48	Kobe Bryant	Los Angeles Lakers	32.8	5
Rebounds	Amar'e Stoudemire	Phoenix Suns	21	Marcus Camby	Denver Nuggets	14.8	5
Assists	Steve Nash	Phoenix Suns	23	Steve Nash	Phoenix Suns	13.3	11
Steals	Baron Davis	Golden State Warriors	6	Baron Davis	Golden State Warriors	2.9	11
Blocks	Tim Duncan	San Antonio Spurs	9	Marcus Camby	Denver Nuggets	3.2	5

== Broadcasters ==
=== Eastern Conference first round ===
==== National television ====
Year	Teams	Network	Play-by-play announcer	Color analyst(s)	Sideline reporter(s)	Studio host	Studio analyst(s)
2007	Cleveland–Washington	TNT (Games 1, 3); NBA TV (Games 2, 4)	Marv Albert				

==== Local television ====
Year	Teams	Network	Play-by-play announcer	Color analyst(s)	Sideline reporter(s)
2007	Cleveland–Washington	Fox Sports Ohio and WUAB-TV (Cleveland area)	Michael Reghi	Austin Carr	
2007	Cleveland–Washington	Comcast SportsNet (Washington D.C. area)			

==== Local radio ====
Year	Teams	Flagship station	Play-by-play	Color commentator(s)
2007	Detroit–Orlando	WDFN-AM (Detroit)		
2007	Detroit–Orlando	WDBO-AM (Orlando)		
2007	Chicago–Miami	WCKG-FM (Chicago)		
2007	Chicago–Miami	WIOD-AM (Miami)		
2007	Cleveland–Washington	WTAM-AM (Cleveland)	Joe Tait	
2007	Cleveland–Washington	WTEM-AM (Washington)		
2007	New Jersey–Toronto	WFAN-AM (New Jersey)		
2007	New Jersey–Toronto	CJCL-AM (Toronto)		

=== Eastern Conference semifinals ===
==== National television ====
Year	Teams	Network	Play-by-play announcer	Color analyst(s)	Sideline reporter(s)	Studio host	Studio analyst(s)
2007	Cleveland–New Jersey	ABC (Game 1); TNT (Games 2, 4–5); ESPN (Games 3, 6)					

==== Local television ====
Year	Teams	Network	Play-by-play announcer	Color analyst(s)	Sideline reporter(s)
2007	Cleveland–New Jersey	Fox Sports Ohio and WUAB-TV (Cleveland area) (Games 3, 6)			
2007	Cleveland–New Jersey	YES Network (New Jersey) (New York area) (Games 3, 6)			

==== National radio ====
Year	Teams	Network	Play-by-play	Color commentator(s)
2007	Detroit–Chicago			
2007	Cleveland–New Jersey	ESPN (Game 1)		

==== Local radio ====
Year	Teams	Flagship station	Play-by-play	Color commentator(s)
2007	Detroit–Chicago	WDFN-AM (Detroit)		
2007	Detroit–Chicago	WCKG-FM (Chicago)		
2007	Cleveland–New Jersey	WTAM-AM (Cleveland)	Joe Tait	
2007	Cleveland–New Jersey	WFAN-AM (New Jersey)		
