= Jordan Rules =

Basketball strategy against Michael Jordan

The Jordan Rules was a basketball tactic employed by the Detroit Pistons of the National Basketball Association to limit scoring by the Chicago Bulls' Michael Jordan.

== History ==
After the Chicago Bulls’ Michael Jordan scored 59 points against the Detroit Pistons in a game on April 3, 1988 at the Pontiac Silverdome, Pistons coach Chuck Daly and his assistants, Ron Rothstein and Dick Versace, devised a strategy "to play him tough, to physically challenge him and to vary its defenses so as to try to throw him off balance." Key players were Dennis Rodman and Bill Laimbeer.

The Jordan Rules became part of the rivalry between the "Bad Boys" Pistons and Jordan's Bulls in the late 1980s and early 1990s.

Daly described the Jordan Rules in an interview with Sports Illustrated:

If Michael was at the point, we forced him left and doubled him. If he was on the left wing, we went immediately to a double team from the top. If he was on the right wing, we went to a slow double team. He could hurt you equally from either wing—hell, he could hurt you from the hot-dog stand—but we just wanted to vary the look. And if he was on the box, we doubled with a big guy. The other rule was, any time he went by you, you had to nail him. If he was coming off a screen, nail him. We didn't want to be dirty—I know some people thought we were—but we had to make contact and be very physical.

On offense, the Detroit players Jordan was guarding would pass the basketball, forcing Jordan to work hard on both ends of the court. "I don't think Chuck Daly wanted to hurt him; he was just looking to wear him out", former Bulls center Will Perdue said years later. In an ESPN 30 for 30, Joe Dumars said, "It was like the Da Vinci Code, the formula to Coca-Cola, and the Jordan rules".

The Pistons sometimes used the strategy against other prolific scoring guards.

The Jordan Rules were most effective for the Pistons during their first three playoff meetings with the Bulls. In 1988, Detroit beat Chicago four games to one. then defeated the Bulls in six games in 1989 and seven games in 1990, both of the latter victories leading to championships.

=== Response ===
To counter the Jordan Rules, Jordan bulked up to 215 pounds to withstand the physical play of his opponents, and the Bulls began mastering the triangle offense behind head coach Phil Jackson and assistant Tex Winter. The new offense emphasized more ball movement and spacing, enabling Jordan to share the offensive load rather than shouldering it. In the 1990–91 season, the Bulls won a franchise-record 61 games and swept the Pistons in the 1991 Eastern Conference Finals. Soon after, the Bulls won their first NBA title, beating the Los Angeles Lakers in the NBA Finals 4 games to 1. The Pistons qualified for the playoffs again in 1992, 1996, 1997, 1999, and 2000, but did not advance to the second round until 2002.

The teams that faced the Pistons in the playoffs disliked the Jordan Rules. It was rumored that Jordan, Magic Johnson, and Larry Bird lobbied for the Pistons' Isiah Thomas to be excluded from the 1992 United States men's Olympic basketball team (also known as the "Dream Team"). Although Daly was named head coach of Team USA, Thomas was seen as the ringleader of the Pistons' implementation of the Jordan Rules.

The Jordan Rules strategy was used by the New York Knicks from 1992 to 1998, under the tutelage of Pat Riley who served as their head coach from the 1991-92 to the 1994-95 seasons. However, the Knicks were not successful as Detroit in containing Jordan and the Bulls. Jordan faced the Knicks in the NBA Playoffs in 1991, 1992, 1993, and 1996, and won NBA titles in all four of those seasons. The only Knicks playoff series win against the Bulls during this period was in 1994, during Jordan's first retirement.
