= Bulls–Pistons rivalry =

National Basketball Association rivalry

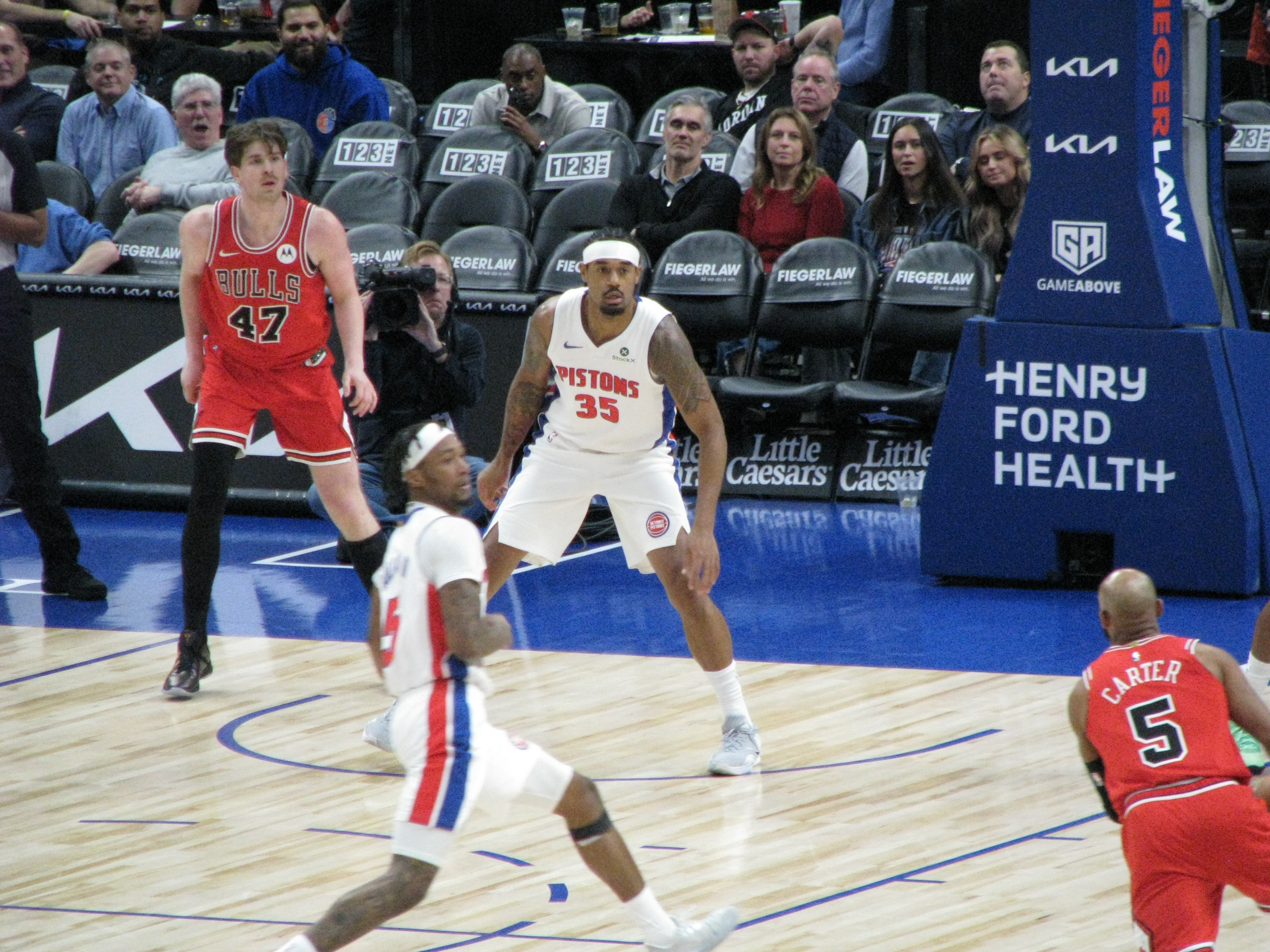
- Chicago Bulls vs. Detroit Pistons regular season game at the Little Caesars Arena in January 2026

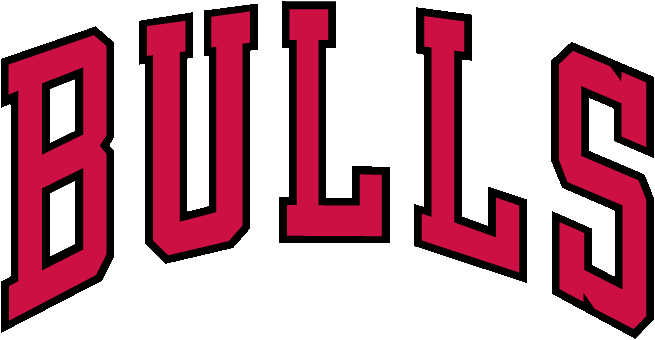
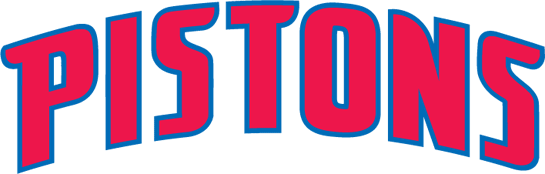
- Chicago Bulls Detroit Pistons
- First meeting: October 28, 1966; Pistons 129, Bulls 117
- Latest meeting: February 21, 2026; Pistons 126, Bulls 110
- Next meeting: December 26, 2026

Statistics
- Total meetings: 324
- All-time series: 164–160 (CHI)
- Regular season series: 148–141 (CHI)
- Postseason results: 19–16 (DET)
- Longest win streak: CHI W19
- Current win streak: DET W3

Postseason history
- 1974 Western Conference Semifinals: Bulls won, 4–3; 1988 Eastern Conference Semifinals: Pistons won, 4–1; 1989 Eastern Conference Finals: Pistons won, 4–2; 1990 Eastern Conference Finals: Pistons won, 4–3; 1991 Eastern Conference Finals: Bulls won, 4–0; 2007 Eastern Conference Semifinals: Pistons won, 4–2

Locations of the Chicago Bulls and Detroit Pistons

The Bulls–Pistons rivalry is an NBA rivalry between the Chicago Bulls and Detroit Pistons. The rivalry began in the late 1980s and was one of the most intense in NBA history for several years, when Michael Jordan evolved into one of the league's best players and the Pistons became a playoff contender. They represent the two largest metro areas in the Midwest and are only separated by a 280-mile (450 km) stretch of road, mostly covered by I-94, which is a factor in the two cities’ rivalries with each other in other sports besides basketball.

== History ==
=== 1988–90: The Bad Boys and Jordan Rules ===
The two teams met in the playoffs for the first time in the 1974 Western Conference Semifinals which the Bulls won in seven games. But the rivalry really started in the 1988 Eastern Conference Semifinals after the Pistons and Bulls beat the Bullets and Cavs in the first round 3–2. The aggressive Bad Boys, as Detroit became known, were the rising power in the Eastern Conference. Michael Jordan, on the other hand, was league MVP, Defensive Player of the Year, and the ultimate challenge for the Pistons' top-notch defense. In a nationally televised game in Detroit on Easter Sunday, Jordan scored 59 points in a 112–110 Bulls victory. Previously, in 1987, he had scored 61 points in a 125–120 OT victory. This angered Chuck Daly, who vowed never to allow Jordan to light them up again. Despite Jordan's individual skills, the Bulls lacked the talent and mental toughness to beat Detroit, who defeated Chicago in 5 games. The Pistons went on to beat Boston in 6 and won their first Conference title since they moved from Fort Wayne. In 1989, the Pistons were stronger and posted a season-best record of 63–19. They reached the Conference Finals by sweeping the Celtics and Bucks. The 6th-seeded Bulls (47–35) had surprising success in the playoffs by upsetting the Cavs 3–2 with The Shot and Knicks 4–2. The Bulls met Detroit in the Eastern Conference Finals. Bulls success continued as they took a 2–1 series lead. But the Pistons clamped down and employed the "Jordan Rules" (which consisted of solely targeting Jordan) which worked so well for them the year prior. While they remained silent about them when asked by the media, many Pistons today say that it was just another psychological ploy they made up to throw the Bulls off their game. According to Pistons forward Rick Mahorn,

We were just throwing stuff out there. It was just a joke. Chuck throws it out there that we had some secret plan to stop Jordan, and everybody just jumped on it. Everybody was writing stories about this strategy. When we kept reading about it, Isiah told us that we had gotten in their heads, and that's how we had them beat.

The Pistons won 3 straight games and went on to win their first NBA title.

While both teams intensely disliked each other, there was particular animosity between Michael Jordan and Pistons star Isiah Thomas. Thomas, who was a Chicago native and basketball legend in the city, is accused of feeling that Jordan was taking the city away from him and getting unearned attention. Thomas was accused of leading a so-called "freeze-out" in the 1985 NBA All-Star Game that involved Thomas and other NBA veterans keeping the ball away from Jordan. In retaliation, when the 1992 United States men's Olympic basketball team was being formed Isiah was not part of the team, which people attribute to Jordan and Scottie Pippen stating that they did not want to play if Thomas was on the team, with Pippen going as far to label him as a "cheap shot artist".

For the 1989–90 season under new coach Phil Jackson, the Bulls sought to subvert the "Jordan Rules" by focusing on the triangle offense refined by assistant coach Tex Winter. By sharing responsibility rather than shouldering it, Jordan led Chicago to the second-best record in the East at 55–27 behind the defending champion Pistons, who finished 59–23. The rematch was set up when Detroit swept Indiana in the opening round, then ousted New York in 5. The Bulls beat the Bucks in 4 and 76ers in 5. In an Eastern Conference Finals rematch, Chicago pushed Detroit to the limit. But the Pistons showed their dominance and won Game 7 at home. The Pistons went on to win their 2nd straight NBA title against the Blazers.

=== 1991: The Bulls finally break through ===
For the 1990–91 season, Bulls posted the best record in the East at 61–21, while the Pistons would drop to third with a record of 50–32. The Bulls reached the Conference Finals by sweeping the Knicks and beating the 76ers in 5, while the Pistons disposed of Atlanta in 5 and beat Boston in 6. Both teams met in the Conference Finals for the third straight year, with Chicago holding home-court advantage for the first time. Chicago swept Detroit. Isiah Thomas, Bill Laimbeer and Mark Aguirre, in their last show of defiance, walked off the court with 7.9 seconds left so as not to congratulate them. Only Joe Dumars and John Salley shook hands with any of the Bulls. In the NBA Finals, the Bulls defeated Magic Johnson's Lakers to win their 1st NBA title.

=== Dormancy ===
The Pistons and Bulls would never again meet in the playoffs during the Bulls dynasty, although they came close in both 1992 and 1997. Following the 1991 sweep, James Edwards and Vinnie Johnson would leave the Pistons as free agents, and the team would see a steady decline. Chuck Daly would resign as head coach after the 1991–92 season. Following Daly's departure, the Pistons went through a lengthy transitional period, as key players either retired (Laimbeer in 1993 and Thomas in 1994) or got traded (John Salley, Dennis Rodman among others). They would bottom out in the 1993–94 season, finishing only 20–62.

With the arrival of Grant Hill (drafted 3rd overall in 1994), the Pistons once again became a playoff team in the latter half of the 1990s. Despite seeing some success during that period, they never became true title contenders.

Meanwhile, the Bulls proceeded to win 6 titles in 8 years, including two three-peats, with an early retirement and return of Michael Jordan in between. Former Piston Dennis Rodman, would be traded to the Bulls in 1995 and play an integral part in the second three-peat and during that second three-peat Dennis Rodman would not interact with Jordan or Pippen outside of games(John Salley and James Edwards were also on the team during the record-breaking 72-win 1995–96 season). After the 6th title, the Bulls were dramatically dismantled: Jordan, Scottie Pippen, Rodman, and coach Phil Jackson all left. Afterwards, the Bulls had five losing seasons and did not yield a competitive squad until former Bull John Paxson (who was a member of the first 3 title teams) became the GM and acquired players to form a team with efficient perimeter offense and strong interior defense.

After being swept by the Miami Heat in the 2000 playoffs, Joe Dumars was hired as President of Basketball Operations of Pistons. Dumars eventually revamped the Pistons' roster with players like Ben Wallace, Chucky Atkins, Chauncey Billups, Richard "Rip" Hamilton, Tayshaun Prince. and Rasheed Wallace. They were constant playoff contenders with Six consecutive Eastern Conference Finals appearances between 2003 and 2008. They defeated the Los Angeles Lakers in five games for the team's third NBA championship in 2004 NBA Finals.

=== The rivalry returns ===
The rivalry was restored in the 2006 offseason when the Bulls signed free agent Ben Wallace, the cornerstone of the Pistons' defense. The addition of Wallace was immediately felt when the Bulls won the first regular season game in a blowout against the defending champion Miami Heat, the team that defeated the Pistons in the 2006 Eastern Conference Finals.

The move of Ben Wallace stymied the Pistons early in the season, as the team sought to look for consistency without him. Dumars took the initiative and signed Chris Webber, who was just released from the 76ers. The teams met in the Eastern Conference Semifinals after the Pistons swept the Magic and the Bulls swept the Heat. The Pistons dominated the early parts of the series, stifling the Bulls' guards to sub-40% shooting to win not only the first two games at home, but also the first game in Chicago, in which the Pistons came back from a 17-point deficit in the second half. The Bulls shut down the Pistons' offense in the next two games to win Games 4 and 5. However, the Pistons won Game 6 in Chicago, winning the series 4–2.

=== Another dormant period ===
The Pistons made it back to the Conference Finals in 2008. Chauncey Billups was traded early in the 2009 season, and they steadily declined. The Cleveland Cavaliers swept them in 2009. The Pistons signed free-agents Ben Gordon and Charlie Villanueva, and welcomed back Ben Wallace that offseason. However, injuries demoted them from an Eastern Conference power, winning only 27 games in the 2010 season, thus a rebuilding period for the team began. The team did manage to make it to the playoffs once again in 2016, once again losing to the Cleveland Cavaliers in a four-game sweep.

After missing the playoffs in a dismal 2008, the Bulls earned the first pick in the 2008 NBA draft. They selected Chicago native Derrick Rose. The Bulls steadily rose to one of the NBA's elite teams; after a pair of 41-win seasons in Rose's first two seasons, the Bulls signed free-agent forward Carlos Boozer, and with the development of Joakim Noah to one of the best centers in the league, the Bulls rose the ranks in the Eastern Conference. However, subsequent injuries to Rose demoted them from being an elite team, and the team would struggle with inconsistency for several years. After trading Rose in 2016 and star forward Jimmy Butler in 2017, another rebuilding period began for the Bulls. Later on, Jordan would reflect on the Bulls–Pistons rivalry and he still does not like the Bad Boys Pistons team.

On January 19, 2023, the Bulls and Pistons played the NBA Paris Game at Accor Arena in Paris, France during the regular season. The Bulls, led by Zach LaVine, won the game 126–108.

The 2023–24 NBA season was the first since 2019 where the Bulls did not sweep the season series against the Pistons. Despite the Pistons notoriously going a terrible 14–68 on the season, they managed to tie their season series with the Bulls, both winning and dropping one apiece at home. During their 2024–25 turnaround campaign from league-worst to playoff team, the Pistons defeated the Bulls 132–92 at the United Center on February 11, 2025. In the blowout victory, the Pistons recorded a franchise-record 42-point halftime lead and led by as many as 49 points, while the Bulls also missed 20 consecutive three-point attempts, a franchise record, to begin the game, shooting just 10-of-47 from deep.

== Season-by-season results ==
Chicago Bulls vs. Detroit Pistons Season-by-Season Results
1960s (Pistons, 15–13)

Season	Season series		at Chicago Bulls	at Detroit Pistons	at Neutral Site	Overall series	Notes
1966–67	Pistons	5–4	Pistons, 3–1	Bulls, 2–1	Tie, 1–1	Pistons; 5–4	Neutral site games were played at: War Memorial Coliseum, Fort Wayne, Indiana; Roberts Stadium, Evansville, Indiana; Chicago Bulls join the NBA as an expansion team and were placed in the Western Division alongside the Detroit Pistons.
1967–68	Pistons	4–3	Bulls, 2–1	Pistons, 3–0	Bulls, 1–0	Pistons; 9–7	Neutral site game was played at Madison Square Garden (IV), New York City, New York. Pistons move to the Eastern Division. Bulls open up Chicago Stadium.
1968–69	Tie	3–3	Bulls, 2–1	Pistons, 2–1		Pistons; 12–10	On March 23, 1969, at Detroit, Pistons beat the Bulls 158–114, tied for their largest victory against the Bulls with a 44-point differential, their most points scored in a game overall against the Bulls, and their largest victory at home against the Bulls.
1969–70	Tie	3–3	Bulls, 2–0	Pistons, 2–1	Pistons, 1–0	Pistons; 15–13	Neutral game site was played at Municipal Auditorium, Kansas City, Missouri. Last season the rivalry was played at a neutral site.

1970s (Bulls, 34–29)

Season	Season series		at Chicago Bulls	at Detroit Pistons	Overall series	Notes
1970–71	Tie	3–3	Bulls, 2–1	Pistons, 2–1	Pistons; 18–16	Bulls and Pistons are placed in the Western Conference and in the Midwest Division
1971–72	Bulls	5–1	Bulls, 3–0	Bulls, 2–1	Bulls; 21–19	Bulls take the overall series record for the first time.
1972–73	Pistons	4–3	Bulls, 2–1	Pistons, 3–1	Bulls; 24–23	
1973–74	Bulls	5–2	Bulls, 4–0	Pistons, 2–1	Bulls; 29–25	
1974 Western Conference Semifinals	Bulls	4–3	Bulls, 3–1	Pistons, 2–1	Bulls; 33–28	1st postseason series. Only time both teams faced each other in the Western Conference playoffs.
1974–75	Pistons	5–4	Bulls, 3–1	Pistons, 4–1	Bulls; 37–33	
1975–76	Pistons	4–3	Tie, 2–2	Pistons, 2–1	Bulls; 40–37	
1976–77	Tie	2–2	Tie, 1–1	Tie, 1–1	Bulls; 42–39	
1977–78	Tie	2–2	Tie, 1–1	Tie, 1–1	Bulls; 44–41	Last season Pistons played at Cobo Arena.
1978–79	Tie	2–2	Tie, 1–1	Tie, 1–1	Bulls; 46–43	Pistons move to the Eastern Conference and are placed in the Central Division. Pistons open up Pontiac Silverdome.
1979–80	Tie	1–1	Bulls, 1–0	Pistons, 1–0	Bulls; 47–44	

1980s (Pistons, 48–22)

Season	Season series		at Chicago Bulls	at Detroit Pistons	Overall series	Notes
1980–81	Bulls	5–1	Bulls, 3–0	Bulls, 2–1	Bulls; 52–45	Bulls move to the Eastern Conference and are placed in the Central Division, reuniting them with the Pistons and making them divisional rivals again. On January 22, 1981, at Detroit, Bulls beat the Pistons 125–92, their largest victory against the Pistons at Detroit with a 33-point differential.
1981–82	Pistons	6–0	Pistons, 3–0	Pistons, 3–0	Bulls; 52–51	First time Pistons sweep the Bulls in the season series. First time the Pistons finish with a winning record in Chicago since the 1966 season. Isiah Thomas makes his debut for the Pistons.
1982–83	Pistons	4–2	Bulls, 2–1	Pistons, 3–0	Pistons; 55–54	Pistons retake the overall record. On January 4, 1983, at Chicago, Bulls beat the Pistons 147–138, their most points scored in a game overall against the Pistons. On November 3, 1982, at Detroit, Bulls lost to the Pistons 144–152, their most points scored in a game at Detroit against the Pistons.
1983–84	Pistons	5–1	Pistons, 2–1	Pistons, 3–0	Pistons; 60–55	
1984–85	Tie	3–3	Bulls, 2–1	Pistons, 2–1	Pistons; 63–58	Michael Jordan makes his debut for the Bulls.
1985–86	Pistons	4–2	Bulls, 2–1	Pistons, 3–0	Pistons; 67–60	
1986–87	Tie	3–3	Bulls, 2–1	Pistons, 2–1	Pistons; 70–63	
1987–88	Pistons	4–2	Pistons, 2–1	Pistons, 2–1	Pistons; 74–65	Last season Pistons played at Pontiac Silverdome.
1988 Eastern Conference Semifinals	Pistons	4–1	Pistons, 2–0	Pistons, 2–1	Pistons; 78–66	2nd postseason series. Pistons deployed a defensive basketball strategy known as "Jordan Rules" to beat Michael Jordan and the Bulls. Pistons go on to lose 1988 NBA Finals.
1988–89	Pistons	6–0	Pistons, 3–0	Pistons, 3–0	Pistons; 84–66	Pistons open The Palace of Auburn Hills. Pistons finish with the best record in the league (63–19)
1989 Eastern Conference Finals	Pistons	4–2	Pistons, 2–1	Pistons, 2–1	Pistons; 88–68	3rd postseason series. Pistons go on to win 1989 NBA Finals, their first NBA championship.
1989–90	Pistons	4–1	Pistons, 2–1	Pistons, 2–0	Pistons; 92–69	

1990s (Bulls, 38–16)

Season	Season series		at Chicago Bulls	at Detroit Pistons	Overall series	Notes
1990 Eastern Conference Finals	Pistons	4–3	Bulls, 3–0	Pistons, 4–0	Pistons; 96–72	4th postseason series. First time home team wins all games in this postseason series. Pistons go on to win 1990 NBA Finals.
1990–91	Bulls	3–2	Bulls, 2–0	Pistons, 2–1	Pistons; 98–75	One game was played on Christmas. Bulls win the season series for the first time since the 1980 season.
1991 Eastern Conference Finals	Bulls	4–0	Bulls, 2–0	Bulls, 2–0	Pistons; 98–79	5th postseason series. Bulls and Pistons meet in three consecutive Eastern Conference Finals and four consecutive times in the playoffs Bulls go on to win 1991 NBA Finals, their first NBA championship.
1991–92	Bulls	4–1	Bulls, 3–0	Tie, 1–1	Pistons; 99–83	Bulls finish with the best record in the league (67–15). Bulls win 1992 NBA Finals.
1992–93	Bulls	3–1	Bulls, 2–0	Tie, 1–1	Pistons; 100–86	Pistons record their 100th win over the Bulls. Bulls win 1993 NBA Finals, their first Three-peat.
1993–94	Bulls	5–0	Bulls, 2–0	Bulls, 3–0	Pistons; 100–91	Michael Jordan leaves the Bulls in the offseason. First time Bulls sweep the Pistons in the season series. Last season Isiah Thomas played for the Pistons. Last season Bulls played at Chicago Stadium.
1994–95	Bulls	5–0	Bulls, 3–0	Bulls, 2–0	Pistons; 100–96	Midway through the season, Michael Jordan rejoins the Bulls. In the offseason, Isiah Thomas announces his retirement. Bulls open up United Center.
1995–96	Bulls	4–0	Bulls, 2–0	Bulls, 2–0	Tie; 100–100	Bulls record their 100th win over the Pistons. Bulls finish with the best record in the league and also set a record for most wins in a season at the time (72–10) (Broken by the 2015 73–9 Warriors). Bulls win 1996 NBA Finals.
1996–97	Bulls	3–1	Bulls, 2–0	Tie, 1–1	Bulls; 103–101	One game was played on Christmas. Bulls win 19 games in a row against the Pistons. Bulls finish with the best record in the league (69–13). Bulls win 1997 NBA Finals.
1997–98	Bulls	3–1	Bulls, 2–0	Tie, 1–1	Bulls; 106–102	Bulls win 23 home games in a row against the Pistons. Bulls win 1998 NBA Finals, becoming the first team in NBA history to have two separate three-peats. Last season Michael Jordan played for the Bulls.
1998–99	Pistons	3–0	Pistons, 2–0	Pistons, 1–0	Bulls; 106–105	Pistons win the season series against the Bulls and finish with a winning record at Chicago for the first time since the 1989 season. On May 3, 1999 at Chicago, Pistons beat the Bulls 115–71, tied for their largest victory against the Bulls with a 44-point differential and their largest victory at Chicago against the Bulls.
1999–2000	Pistons	3–1	Tie, 1–1	Pistons, 2–0	Pistons; 108–107	

2000s (Pistons, 28–18)

Season	Season series		at Chicago Bulls	at Detroit Pistons	Overall series	Notes
2000–01	Pistons	4–0	Pistons, 2–0	Pistons, 2–0	Pistons; 112–107	
2001–02	Pistons	3–1	Pistons, 2–0	Tie, 1–1	Pistons; 115–108	
2002–03	Pistons	4–0	Pistons, 2–0	Pistons, 2–0	Pistons; 119–108	
2003–04	Pistons	4–0	Pistons, 2–0	Pistons, 2–0	Pistons; 123–108	Pistons win 9 games in a row against the Bulls. Pistons win 2004 NBA Finals.
2004–05	Tie	2–2	Pistons, 2–0	Bulls, 2–0	Pistons; 125–110	Pistons lose 2005 NBA Finals.
2005–06	Pistons	4–0	Pistons, 2–0	Pistons, 2–0	Pistons; 129–110	Pistons win 12 away games in a row against the Bulls. Pistons finish with the best record in the league (64–18).
2006–07	Bulls	3–1	Bulls, 2–0	Tie, 1–1	Pistons; 130–113	
2007 Eastern Conference Semifinals	Pistons	4–2	Pistons, 2–1	Pistons, 2–1	Pistons; 134–115	6th postseason series. First time both teams meet in the postseason in the 21st century.
2007–08	Bulls	3–1	Bulls, 2–0	Tie, 1–1	Pistons; 135–118	
2008–09	Bulls	3–1	Bulls, 2–0	Tie, 1–1	Pistons; 136–121	
2009–10	Bulls	4–0	Bulls, 2–0	Bulls, 2–0	Pistons; 136–125	

2010s (Bulls, 24–16)

Season	Season series		at Chicago Bulls	at Detroit Pistons	Overall series	Notes
2010–11	Bulls	4–0	Bulls, 2–0	Bulls, 2–0	Pistons; 136–129	Bulls finish with the best record in the league (62–20).
2011–12	Bulls	4–0	Bulls, 2–0	Bulls, 2–0	Pistons; 136–133	Bulls finish tied with the best record in the league (50–16).
2012–13	Bulls	3–1	Bulls, 2–0	Tie, 1–1	Pistons; 137–136	Bulls win 18 games in a row against the Pistons. Bulls win 12 home games in a row against the Pistons.
2013–14	Bulls	3–1	Tie, 1–1	Bulls, 2–0	Bulls; 139–138	
2014–15	Tie	2–2	Bulls, 2–0	Pistons, 2–0	Bulls; 141–140	
2015–16	Pistons	3–1	Pistons, 2–0	Tie, 1–1	Pistons; 143–142	Pistons finish with a winning record in Chicago in the regular season for the first time since the 2005 season. On December 18, 2015, Pistons beat the Bulls 147–144, their most points scored in a game at Chicago against the Bulls.
2016–17	Tie	2–2	Bulls, 2–0	Pistons, 2–0	Pistons; 145–144	Last season Pistons played at The Palace of Auburn Hills.
2017–18	Pistons	3–1	Tie, 1–1	Pistons, 2–0	Pistons; 148–145	Pistons open up Little Caesars Arena.
2018–19	Pistons	4–0	Pistons, 2–0	Pistons, 2–0	Pistons; 152–145	Pistons sweep the season series over the Bulls for the first time since the 2005 season.
2019–20	Bulls	4–0	Bulls, 2–0	Bulls, 2–0	Pistons; 152–149	

2020s (Bulls, 15–8)

Season	Season series		at Chicago Bulls	at Detroit Pistons	Overall series	Notes
2020–21	Bulls	3–0	Bulls, 1–0	Bulls, 2–0	Tie; 152–152	
2021–22	Bulls	4–0	Bulls, 2–0	Bulls, 2–0	Bulls; 156–152	On January 11, 2022 at Chicago, Bulls beat the Pistons 133–87, their largest victory over the Pistons with a 46-point differential.
2022–23	Bulls	4–0	Bulls, 2–0	Bulls, 2–0	Bulls; 160–152	Bulls win 15 games in a row against the Pistons, the third time they have won 15+ in a row against the Pistons. On January 19, 2023, Bulls beat the Pistons 126–108 at Accor Arena in Paris, France. The game is accounted as a Detroit home game.
2023–24	Tie	2–2	Tie, 1–1	Tie, 1–1	Bulls; 162–154	
2024–25	Pistons	3–1	Pistons, 2–0	Tie, 1–1	Bulls; 163–157	On February 11, 2025, at Chicago, the Pistons beat the Bulls 132–92 after setting a franchise record of 42-point halftime lead over the Bulls, while the Bulls set a franchise record of missing 20 consecutive three-point attempts to start the game during the first half.
2025–26	Pistons	3–1	Tie, 1–1	Pistons, 2–0	Bulls; 164–160	

Summary of Results

Season	Season series		at Chicago Bulls	at Detroit Pistons	at Neutral Site	Notes
Regular season games	Bulls	148–141	Bulls, 91–54	Pistons, 85–57	Tie, 2–2	
Postseason games	Pistons	19–16	Bulls, 10–7	Pistons, 12–6		
Postseason series	Pistons	4–2	Pistons, 2–1	Pistons, 2–1		Western Conference Semifinals: 1974; Eastern Conference Semifinals: 1988, 2007; Eastern Conference Finals: 1989, 1990, 1991
Regular and postseason	Bulls	164–160	Bulls, 99–61	Pistons, 97–63	Tie, 2–2	There were 4 neutral site games played in total: 1 game was played at War Memorial Coliseum, Roberts Stadium, Evansville, Madison Square Garden (IV), and Municipal Auditorium.

== See also ==
- Bears–Lions rivalry
- Blackhawks–Red Wings rivalry
- George Jewett Trophy
- Illinois–Michigan football rivalry

== Notes ==
- During the 2007 NBA All-Star Weekend, the two teams competed against each other in the Shooting Stars Competition. Chicago (Ben Gordon, Candice Dupree, Scottie Pippen) and Detroit (Chauncey Billups, Swin Cash, Bill Laimbeer) both qualified to reach the Finals. The Bulls were disqualified when Gordon shot out of order before Dupree, allowing Detroit to win by default. Billups, Cash, and Laimbeer celebrated by shouting out Mason's famous chant of, "Deeeeee-troit Basket-ball!" Mason was at the Thomas and Mack Center to announce during the games and events at the 2007 NBA All-Star Weekend.
