= 1935 Pittsburgh Pirates (NFL) season =

3rd season of NFL team Pittsburgh Steelers

1935 Pittsburgh Pirates season
- Owner: Art Rooney
- Head coach: Joe Bach
- Home stadium: Forbes Field

Results
- Record: 4–8
- Division place: 3rd NFL Eastern
- Playoffs: Did not qualify

The 1935 Pittsburgh Pirates season was the team's third season since its formation two years prior. The 1935 Pirates (would later be renamed in 1940) fired former coach Luby DiMeolo after completing the '34 season with a 2–10 record. They brought in Duquesne head coach, Joe Bach, who improved their record to 4–8, and stayed until the next season before returning to coach in college.

== Regular season ==
=== Schedule ===
Game	Date	Opponent	Result	Record	Venue	Attendance	Recap	Sources
1	September 13	at **Philadelphia Eagles**	**W** 17–7	1–0	Temple Stadium	20,000	Recap	
2	September 22	**New York Giants**	**L** 7–42	1–1	Forbes Field	24,000	Recap	
3	September 29	Chicago Bears	**L** 7–23	1–2	Forbes Field	11,858	Recap	
4	October 6	at Green Bay Packers	**L** 0–27	1–3	City Stadium	5,000	Recap	
5	October 9	**Philadelphia Eagles**	**L** 6–17	1–4	Forbes Field	6,271	Recap	
6	October 20	Chicago Cardinals	**W** 17–13	2–4	Forbes Field	7,000	Recap	
7	October 27	**Boston Redskins**	**W** 6–0	3–4	Forbes Field	12,000	Recap	
8	November 3	**Brooklyn Dodgers**	**L** 7–13	3–5	Forbes Field	13,390	Recap	
9	November 10	at **Brooklyn Dodgers**	**W** 16–7	4–5	Ebbets Field	18,000	Recap	
10	November 24	Green Bay Packers	**L** 14–34	4–6	Forbes Field	12,902	Recap	
11	December 1	at **Boston Redskins**	**L** 3–13	4–7	Fenway Park	5,000	Recap	
12	December 8	at **New York Giants**	**L** 0–13	4–8	Polo Grounds	7,000	Recap	
Note: Intra-division opponents are in **bold** text.

== Standings ==
NFL Eastern Division
	W	L	T	PCT	DIV	PF	PA	STK
New York Giants	9	3	0	.750	8–0	180	96	W5
Brooklyn Dodgers	5	6	1	.455	3–4–1	90	141	T1
Pittsburgh Pirates	4	8	0	.333	3–5	100	209	L3
Boston Redskins	2	8	1	.200	2–4–1	65	123	T1
Philadelphia Eagles	2	9	0	.182	2–5	60	179	L5

Note: Tie games were not officially counted in the standings until 1972.

=== Game summaries ===
==== Week 1 (Friday September 13, 1935): Philadelphia Eagles ====
	1	2	3	4	Total
Pirates	14	0	0	3	17
Eagles	7	0	0	0	7

at Temple Stadium, Philadelphia, Pennsylvania

- Game time:
- Game weather:
- Game attendance: 20,000
- Referee:

Scoring Drives:

- Philadelphia – Manske 1 pass from Kirkman (Kirkman kick)
- Pittsburgh – Casper 1 run (Niccolai kick)
- Pittsburgh – Ribble blocked punt recovery in end zone (Niccolai kick)
- Pittsburgh – FG Niccolai 47

==== Week 2 (Sunday September 22, 1935): New York Giants ====
	1	2	3	4	Total
Giants	7	21	0	14	42
Pirates	0	0	0	7	7

at Forbes Field, Pittsburgh, Pennsylvania

- Game time:
- Game weather:
- Game attendance: 23,298
- Referee:

Scoring Drives:

- New York – Richards 13 run (Strong kick)
- New York – Burnett 45 pass from Danowski (Strong kick)
- New York – Molenda 30 interception (Strong kick)
- New York – Clancy 10 run (Sarausky kick)
- Pittsburgh – Weisenbaugh 3 pass from Gildea (Niccolai kick)
- New York – Burnett 25 pass from Danowski (Strong kick)
- New York – Sarausky 10 run (Molenda kick)
- Notes: New York head coach Steve Owen admits in 1935 that he "shaved" the game, ordering his Giants to fumble 3 times inside the 10 & didn't call a pass play in the 4th quarter, the world's first public admission of game fixing.

==== Week 3 (Sunday September 29, 1935): Chicago Bears ====
	1	2	3	4	Total
Bears	0	23	0	0	23
Pirates	0	0	7	0	7

at Forbes Field, Pittsburgh, Pennsylvania

- Game time:
- Game weather:
- Game attendance: 11,858
- Referee:

Scoring Drives:

- Chicago Bears – Pollock 13 pass from Masterson (Manders kick)
- Chicago Bears – Johnsos 18 pass from Molesworth (Manders kick)
- Chicago Bears – Johnsos 13 pass from Dunlap (kick failed)
- Chicago Bears – FG Kopcha 26
- Pittsburgh – Casper lateral from Sortet after pass from Gildea (Niccolai kick)

==== Week 4 (Sunday October 6, 1935): Green Bay Packers ====
	1	2	3	4	Total
Pirates	0	0	0	0	0
Packers	0	20	0	7	27

at City Stadium, Green Bay, Wisconsin

- Game time:
- Game weather:
- Game attendance: 5,000
- Referee:

Scoring Drives:

- Green Bay – Sauer 3 run (Schwammel kick)
- Green Bay – Laws run (kick failed)
- Green Bay – Hutson 50 pass from Herber (Smith kick)
- Green Bay – Hutson 1 pass from Herber (Engebretsen kick)

==== Week 5 (Wednesday October 9, 1935): Philadelphia Eagles ====
	1	2	3	4	Total
Eagles	10	0	0	7	17
Pirates	0	0	0	6	6

at Forbes Field, Pittsburgh, Pennsylvania

- Game time:
- Game weather:
- Game attendance: 6,271
- Referee:

Scoring Drives:

- Philadelphia – Matesic 2 run (Reese kick)
- Philadelphia – FG Reese 40
- Philadelphia – Carter 58 pass from Storm (Reese kick)
- Pittsburgh – Weisenbaugh 10 pass from Doehring (kick failed)

==== Week 6 (Sunday October 20, 1935): Chicago Cardinals ====
	1	2	3	4	Total
Cardinals	0	7	0	0	7
Pirates	6	6	0	14	26

at Forbes Field, Pittsburgh, Pennsylvania

- Game time:
- Game weather:
- Game attendance: 7,000
- Referee:

Scoring Drives:

- Pittsburgh – Casper 14 pass from Doehring (Niccolai kick)
- Chicago Cardinals – Sarboe 80 punt return (Smith kick)
- Pittsburgh – FG Niccolai 22
- Chicago Cardinals – Nichelini 5 run (kick blocked)
- Pittsburgh – Strutt 74 interception (Niccolai kick)

==== Week 7 (Sunday October 27, 1935): Boston Redskins ====
	1	2	3	4	Total
Redskins	0	0	0	0	0
Pirates	0	3	3	0	6

at Forbes Field, Pittsburgh, Pennsylvania

- Game time:
- Game weather:
- Game attendance: 12,000
- Referee:

Scoring Drives:

- Pittsburgh – FG Niccolai 41
- Pittsburgh – FG Niccolai 46

==== Week 8 (Sunday November 3, 1935): Brooklyn Dodgers ====
	1	2	3	4	Total
Dodgers	7	6	0	0	13
Pirates	0	0	7	0	7

at Forbes Field, Pittsburgh, Pennsylvania

- Game time:
- Game weather:
- Game attendance: 13,390
- Referee:

Scoring Drives:

- Brooklyn – Becker pass from Franklin (Kercheval kick)
- Brooklyn – Hubbard 56 pass from Kercheval (kick blocked)
- Pittsburgh – Wetzel 1 run (Niccolai kick)

==== Week 9 (Sunday November 10, 1935): Brooklyn Dodgers ====
	1	2	3	4	Total
Pirates	6	0	3	7	16
Dodgers	7	0	0	0	7

at Ebbets Field, Brooklyn, New York

- Game time:
- Game weather:
- Game attendance: 18,000
- Referee:

Scoring Drives:

- Brooklyn – Grossman 5 run (Kercheval kick)
- Pittsburgh – Levey 34 pass from Gildea (kick blocked)
- Pittsburgh – FG Niccolai 25
- Pittsburgh – Levey run (Niccolai kick)

Week 10 (Sunday November 17, 1935): Bye

==== Week 11 (Sunday November 24, 1935): Green Bay Packers ====
	1	2	3	4	Total
Packers	6	14	0	14	34
Pirates	0	7	7	0	14

at Forbes Field, Pittsburgh, Pennsylvania

- Game time:
- Game weather:
- Game attendance: 12,902
- Referee:

Scoring Drives:

- Green Bay – Sauer 3 run (kick blocked)
- Green Bay – Sauer 75 interception (Smith kick)
- Pittsburgh – Levey 3 run (Niccolai kick)
- Green Bay – Blood 41 pass from Monnett (Smith kick)
- Pittsburgh – Levey 13 pass from Turley (Niccolai kick)
- Green Bay – Hinkle 2 run (Smith kick)
- Green Bay – Blood 11 interception (Smith kick)

==== Week 12 (Sunday December 1, 1935): Boston Redskins ====
	1	2	3	4	Total
Pirates	0	3	0	0	3
Redskins	0	0	0	13	13

at Fenway Park, Boston, Massachusetts

- Game time:
- Game weather:
- Game attendance: 5,000
- Referee:

Scoring Drives:

- Pittsburgh – FG Niccolai 27
- Boston – Musick run (Musick kick)
- Boston – Renter 19 run (kick failed)

==== Week 13 (Sunday December 8, 1935): New York Giants ====
	1	2	3	4	Total
Pirates	0	0	0	0	0
Giants	3	7	0	3	13

at Polo Grounds, New York, New York

- Game time:
- Game weather:
- Game attendance: 7,000
- Referee:

Scoring Drives:

- New York – FG Newman 29
- New York – Goodwin 65 pass from Danowski (Strong kick)
- New York – FG Strong 44

== Roster ==
1935 Pittsburgh Pirates final roster
Backs: 21 Cy Casper RB/CB/S; 33 Johnny Gildea RB/CB; 15 Warren Heller RB/CB; 12 Jim Levy RB/CB/S; 23 Mike Sebastian RB/CB; 44 Art Strutt RB/CB; 24 John Turley RB/S; 10 Buzz Wetzel FB/LB; 22 Silvio Zaninelli FB/LB; Ends/Receivers: 29 Ben Smith; 20 Bill Sortet; 19 Vic Vidoni	Linemen/Linebackers: 40 Al Arndt G/DG; 11 Maury Bray T/DT; 16 Ben Ciccone C/LB; 14 Henry Hayduk G/DG; 47 Bob Hoel G/DG; 18 Lee Mulleneaux C/LB; 17 Armand Niccolai T/DT/K; 30 Stan Olejniczak T/DT; 13 George Rado G/DG; 28 Sandy Sandberg T/DT; 26 Ed Skoronski C/LB; 25 Bill Snyder G/DG; Rookies in italics
