= 1935 New York Giants season =

NFL team 11th season

- Head coach: Steve Owen
- Home stadium: Polo Grounds

Results
- Record: 9–3
- Division place: 1st NFL Eastern
- Playoffs: Lost NFL Championship (at Lions) 7–26

The 1935 New York Giants season was the franchise's 11th season in the National Football League.

== Schedule ==
Game	Date	Opponent	Result	Record	Venue	Attendance	Recap	Sources
1	September 22	at **Pittsburgh Pirates**	**W** 42–7	1–0	Forbes Field	24,000	Recap	
2	September 29	at Green Bay Packers	**L** 7–16	1–1	City Stadium	10,000	Recap	
3	October 6	at **Boston Redskins**	**W** 20–12	2–1	Fenway Park	8,000	Recap	
4	October 13	**Brooklyn Dodgers**	**W** 10–7	3–1	Polo Grounds	30,000	Recap	
5	October 20	**Boston Redskins**	**W** 17–6	4–1	Polo Grounds	20,000	Recap	
6	October 27	Chicago Cardinals	**L** 13–14	4–2	Polo Grounds	32,000	Recap	
7	November 3	Chicago Bears	**L** 3–20	4–3	Polo Grounds	40,000	Recap	
—	Bye							
8	November 17	at Chicago Bears	**W** 3–0	5–3	Wrigley Field	19,000	Recap	
9	November 24	**Philadelphia Eagles**	**W** 10–0	6–3	Polo Grounds		Recap	
10	November 28	at **Brooklyn Dodgers**	**W** 21–0	7–3	Ebbets Field	25,000	Recap	
11	December 1	at **Philadelphia Eagles**	**W** 21–14	8–3	Baker Bowl	6,500	Recap	
12	December 8	**Pittsburgh Pirates**	**W** 13–0	9–3	Polo Grounds	7,000	Recap	
Note: Intra-division opponents are in **bold** text.

== Game summaries ==
=== Game 1: at Pittsburgh Pirates ===
Week Two: New York Giants at Pittsburgh Pirates

Quarter	1	2	3	4	Total
Giants	7	21	0	14	42
Pirates	0	0	0	7	7

at Forbes Field, Pittsburgh, Pennsylvania

- Date: September 22
- Game attendance: 24,000

Game information

First quarter

- NYG Kink Richards 13-yard run (Ken Strong kick)

Second quarter

- NYG Dale Burnett 45-yard pass from Ed Danowski (Strong kick)
- NYG Bo Molenda 30-yard interception return (Strong kick)
- NYG Stu Clancy 10-yard run (Strong kick)

Fourth quarter

- PIT Heinie Weisenbaugh 3-yard pass from Johnny Gildea (Armand Niccolai kick)
- NYG Burnett 25-yard pass from Danowski (Strong kick)
- NYG Tony Sarausky 10-yard run (Molenda kick)

=== Game 2: at Green Bay Packers ===
Week Three: New York Giants at Green Bay Packers

Quarter	1	2	3	4	Total
Giants	0	7	0	0	7
Packers	0	0	6	10	16

at City Stadium, Green Bay, Wisconsin

- Date: September 29
- Game attendance: 10,000

Game information

Second quarter

- NYG Burnett 45-yard TD after lateral (Strong kick)

Third quarter

- GB Hank Bruder 65-yard interception return (conversion failed)

Fourth quarter

- GB Bob Monnett 17-yard FG
- GB Cal Hubbard 8-yard interception return (Monnett kick)

=== Game 3: at Boston Redskins ===
Week Four: New York Giants at Boston Redskins

Quarter	1	2	3	4	Total
Giants	6	14	0	0	20
Redskins	0	6	6	0	12

at Fenway Park, Boston, Massachusetts

- Date: October 6
- Game attendance: 8,000

Game information

First quarter

- NYG Richards run (conversion failed)

Second quarter

- NYG Burnett 12-yard pass from Danowski (Strong kick)
- BOS Cliff Battles 85-yard kickoff return (conversion failed)
- NYG Burnett pass from Danowski (Strong kick)

Third quarter

- BOS Pug Rentner fumble recovery in end zone (conversion failed)

=== Game 4: vs. Brooklyn Dodgers ===
Week Four: Brooklyn Dodgers at New York Giants

Quarter	1	2	3	4	Total
Dodgers	0	0	0	7	7
Giants	7	0	0	3	10

at Polo Grounds, New York, New York

- Date: October 13
- Game attendance: 30,000

Game information

First quarter

- NYG Strong 24-yard run (Strong kick)

Fourth quarter

- NYG Strong 24-yard FG
- BRK Ray Fuqua 4-yard pass from Wilbur White (Ralph Kercheval kick)

=== Game 5: vs. Boston Redskins ===
Week Six: Boston Redskins at New York Giants

Quarter	1	2	3	4	Total
Redskins	0	0	6	0	6
Giants	17	0	0	0	17

at Polo Grounds, New York, New York

- Date: October 20
- Game attendance: 20,000

Game information

First quarter

- NYG Strong 25 yard FG
- NYG Red Corzine 13-yard return of blocked punt (Strong kick)
- NYG Richards 1-yard run (Harry Newman kick)

Third quarter

- BOS Battles 1 yard run (conversion failed)

=== Game 6: vs. Chicago Cardinals ===
Week Seven: Chicago Cardinals at New York Giants

Quarter	1	2	3	4	Total
Cardinals	0	0	7	7	14
Giants	6	0	7	0	13

at Polo Grounds, New York, New York

- Date: October 27
- Game attendance: 32,000

Game information

First quarter

- NYG Danowski 1-yard run (conversion failed)

Third quarter

- CHC Bill Smith 46-yard pass from Ike Petersen (Smith kick)
- NYG Tod Goodwin 29-yard pass from Danowski (Newman kick)

Fourth quarter

- CHC Phil Sarboe 88-yard punt return (Smith kick)

=== Game 7: vs. Chicago Bears ===
Week Eight: Chicago Bears at New York Giants

Quarter	1	2	3	4	Total
Bears	0	0	7	13	20
Giants	3	0	0	0	3

at Polo Grounds, New York, New York

- Date: November 3
- Game attendance: 40,000

Game information

First quarter

- NYG Richards 8-yard FG

Third quarter

- CHB Beattie Feathers 6-yard run (Jack Manders kick)

Fourth quarter

- CHB Keith Molesworth 1-yard run (conversion failed)
- CHB Bill Karr 29-yard pass from Bernie Masterson (Gene Ronzani kick)

=== Game 8: at Chicago Bears ===
Week Ten: New York Giants at Chicago Bears

Quarter	1	2	3	4	Total
Giants	0	0	3	0	3
Bears	0	0	0	0	0

at Wrigley Field, Chicago, Illinois

- Date: November 17
- Game attendance: 19,000

Game information

Third quarter

- NYG Strong 14-yard FG

=== Game 9: vs. Philadelphia Eagles ===
Week Eleven: Philadelphia Eagles at New York Giants

Quarter	1	2	3	4	Total
Eagles	0	0	0	0	0
Giants	0	0	7	3	10

at Polo Grounds, New York, New York

- Date: November 24

Game information

Third quarter

- NYG Goodwin 55-yard pass from Danowski (Strong kick)

Fourth quarter

- NYG Newman 20-yard FG

=== Game 10: at Brooklyn Dodgers ===
Week Twelve, Game 1: New York Giants at Brooklyn Dodgers

Quarter	1	2	3	4	Total
Giants	0	7	7	7	21
Dodgers	0	0	0	0	0

at Ebbets Field, Brooklyn, New York

- Date: November 28
- Game attendance: 25,000

Game information

Second quarter

- NYG Burnett 7-yard pass from Danowski (Strong kick)

Third quarter

- NYG Goodwin 31-yard pass from Danowski (Molenda kick)

Fourth quarter

- NYG Ike Frankian 10-yard fumble return (Molenda kick)

=== Game 11: at Philadelphia Eagles ===
Week Twelve, Game 2: New York Giants at Philadelphia Eagles

Quarter	1	2	3	4	Total
Giants	0	14	0	7	21
Eagles	7	7	0	0	14

at Baker Bowl, Philadelphia, Pennsylvania

- Date: December 1
- Game attendance: 6,500

Game information

First quarter

- PHI Jim Leonard 1-yard run (Hank Reese kick)

Second quarter

- PHI Eggs Manske 59-yard pass from Ed Storm (Reese kick)
- NYG Danowski run (Molenda kick)
- NYG Walt Singer 7-yard pass from Danoski (Molenda kick)

Fourth quarter

- NYG Richards 31-yard run (Richards kick)

=== Game 12: vs. Pittsburgh Pirates ===
Week Thirteen: Pittsburgh Pirates at New York Giants

Quarter	1	2	3	4	Total
Pirates	0	0	0	0	0
Giants	3	7	0	3	13

at Polo Grounds, New York, New York

- Date: December 8
- Game attendance: 7,000

Game information

First quarter

- NYG Newman 29-yard FG

Second quarter

- NYG Goodwin 65-yard pass from Danowski (Strong kick)

Fourth quarter

- NYG Strong 44-yard FG

== Playoffs ==
Round	Date	Opponent	Result	Venue	Attendance	Recap	Sources
Championship	December 15	at Detroit Lions	L 7–26	University of Detroit Stadium	15,000	Recap	

=== Championship Game: at Detroit Lions ===
1935 NFL Championship: New York Giants at Detroit Lions

Quarter	1	2	3	4	Total
Giants	0	7	0	0	7
Lions	13	0	0	13	26

at University of Detroit Stadium, Detroit, Michigan

- Date: December 15
- Game attendance: 15,000

Game information

First quarter

- DET Ace Gutowsky 2-yard run (Glenn Presnell kick)
- DET Dutch Clark 40-yard run (conversion failed)

Second quarter

- NYG Strong 42-yard pass from Danowski (Strong kick)

Fourth quarter

- DET Ernie Caddell 4-yard run (Clark kick)
- DET Buddy Parker 4-yard run (conversion failed)

== Roster ==
1935 New York Giants final roster
Backs: 18 Dale Burnett RB/CB; 33 Red Corzine FB/LB; 22 Ed Danowski RB/CB/S; 25 Max Krause FB/LB; 23 Bo Molenda FB/LB/K; 12 Harry Newman RB/CB/S/K; 13 Kink Richards RB/CB/S; 11 Tony Sarausky RB/CB/S; 20 Leland Shaffer RB/CB; 50 Ken Strong RB/CB/S/K	Linemen/Linebackers: 8 Bob Bellinger G/DG; 2 Johnny Dell Isola C/LB; 3 Len Grant T/DT; 7 Mel Hein C/LB; 29 Tex Irvin G/DG; 10 Potsy Jones G/DG; 55 Bernie Kaplan G/DG; 27 Bill Morgan T/DT; 36 Bill Owen T/DT; 9 Jess Quatse T/DT	Ends/Receivers: 21 Ike Frankian; 14 Tod Goodwin; 5 Buster Mitchell; 15 Walt Singer; Reserve: 17 Red Badgro E; 4 Stu Clancy RB/CB/S; rookies in italics

== Standings ==
Program for the October 20 game against the visiting Boston Redskins.

NFL Eastern Division
	W	L	T	PCT	DIV	PF	PA	STK
New York Giants	9	3	0	.750	8–0	180	96	W5
Brooklyn Dodgers	5	6	1	.455	3–4–1	90	141	T1
Pittsburgh Pirates	4	8	0	.333	3–5	100	209	L3
Boston Redskins	2	8	1	.200	2–4–1	65	123	T1
Philadelphia Eagles	2	9	0	.182	2–5	60	179	L5

Note: Tie games were not officially counted in the standings until 1972.

== See also ==
- List of New York Giants seasons
