= 1935 All-Pro Team =

Official list of the best NFL players in 1935

The 1935 All-Pro Team consisted of American football players chosen by various selectors for the All-Pro team of the National Football League (NFL) for the 1935 NFL season. Teams were selected by, among others, the NFL coaches (NFL), the United Press (UP), the Green Bay Press-Gazette (GB), Collyer's Eye (CE), and the Chicago Daily News (CDN).

Players displayed in bold were consensus first-team selections. The following six players were selected to the first team by all five selectors: Detroit Lions quarterback Dutch Clark; New York Giants halfback Ed Danowski; Chicago Cardinals end Bill Smith; Chicago Bears end Bill Karr; New York Giants tackle Bill Morgan; and New York Giants center Mel Hein.

== Team ==
Position	Player	Team	Selector(s)
Quarterback	**Dutch Clark**	Detroit Lions	NFL-1, UP-1, GB-1, CE, CDN
Quarterback	**Ed Danowski**	New York Giants	NFL-1, UP-1, GB-1, CE, CDN
Quarterback	Arnie Herber	Green Bay Packers	NFL-2, GB-2 (halfback), CE
Quarterback	Phil Sarboe	Chicago Cardinals	NFL-2, UP-2, GB-2
Halfback	**Ernie Caddel**	Detroit Lions	NFL-1, UP-2, CDN
Halfback	Gene Ronzani	Chicago Bears	NFL-2 [fullback], UP-1
Halfback	George Sauer	Green Bay Packers	GB-1
Halfback	Cliff Battles	Boston Redskins	NFL-2
Halfback	Kink Richards	New York Giants	UP-2
Fullback	**Mike Mikulak**	Chicago Cardinals	NFL-1, GB-1
Fullback	Jack Manders	Chicago Bears	CE, CDN
Fullback	Clarke Hinkle	Green Bay Packers	UP-1
Fullback	Bill Shepherd	Detroit Lions	UP-2, GB-2 [halfback]
Fullback	Ralph Kercheval	Brooklyn Dodgers	GB-2
End	**Bill Smith**	Chicago Cardinals	NFL-1, UP-1, GB-1, CE, CDN
End	**Bill Karr**	Chicago Bears	NFL-1, UP-1, GB-1, CE, CDN
End	Tod Goodwin	New York Giants	NFL-2, UP-2, GB-2
End	Don Hutson	Green Bay Packers	NFL-2, UP-2
End	Eggs Manske	Philadelphia Eagles	GB-2
Tackle	**Bill Morgan**	New York Giants	NFL-1, UP-1, GB-1, CE, CDN
Tackle	**George Musso**	Chicago Bears	NFL-1, UP-2, GB-2, CE, CDN
Tackle	Ade Schwammel	Green Bay Packers	UP-1
Tackle	Turk Edwards	Boston Redskins	GB-1
Tackle	Armand Niccolai	Pittsburgh Pirates	UP-2
Tackle	Tony Blazine	Chicago Cardinals	NFL-2
Tackle	George Christensen	Detroit Lions	NFL-2
Tackle	Bill Lee	Brooklyn Dodgers	GB-2
Guard	**Ox Emerson**	Detroit Lions	NFL-2, UP-1, GB-1, CE, CDN
Guard	**Mike Michalske**	Green Bay Packers	NFL-1, UP-2, GB-1, CDN
Guard	Joe Kopcha	Chicago Bears	NFL-1, UP-1, GB-2
Guard	Potsy Jones	New York Giants	CE
Guard	Phil Handler	Chicago Cardinals	UP-2
Guard	Louis Evans	Green Bay Packers	NFL-2
Guard	Bree Cuppoletti	Chicago Cardinals	GB-2
Center	**Mel Hein**	New York Giants	NFL-1, UP-1, GB-1, CE, CDN
Center	Clare Randolph	Detroit Lions	NFL-2, UP-2
Center	Nate Barragar	Green Bay Packers	GB-2
