= 1935 Philadelphia Eagles season =

NFL team season

- Owner: Bert Bell
- Head coach: Lud Wray
- Home stadium: Baker Bowl (Phillies Park)

Results
- Record: 2–9
- Division place: 5th NFL Eastern
- Playoffs: Did not qualify

The 1935 Philadelphia Eagles season marked their third year in the National Football League (NFL). The team failed to improve on their previous output of 4–7, winning only two games. They failed to qualify for the playoffs for the third consecutive season.

A home game against the Boston Redskins scheduled for November 17 was canceled due to inclement weather — rain which had transformed the playing field at the Baker Bowl (Phillies Park) into a lake. Consequently, the Eagles and the Redskins only played 11 games in 1935, while the other eight teams in the league played 12.

== Off season ==
The Eagles move their training camp to a private school, the Chestnut Hill Academy in Philadelphia, Pennsylvania

== Regular season ==
Although seemingly a mundane 2–9 season, the 1935 Eagles campaign was marked by one rare occurrence in the National Football League — a cancelled game. Torrential rain had hit Philadelphia ahead of the scheduled November 17 match-up with the Boston Redskins, turning the playing surface at the Baker Bowl into a veritable swimming pool. Team owner Bert Bell announced the indefinite postponement of the contest, and expressed hope that a new date could be agreed upon. Holders of tickets purchased in advance were entitled either to a cash refund or to exchange the useless cardboard for tickets to the forthcoming game with the New York Giants on December 1 at Phillies Park, it was declared.

Although both teams had Thanksgiving Day open, logistical difficulties on such short order proved insurmountable and no make-up game was ever held. Both the Eagles and the Redskins completed their season having played just 11 games, with their winning percentage calculated on that basis.

=== Schedule ===
Game	Date	Opponent	Result	Record	Venue	Attendance	Recap	Sources
1	September 13	Pittsburgh Pirates	**L** 7–17	0–1	Temple Stadium	20,000	Recap	
2	September 20	at Detroit Lions	**L** 0–35	0–2	University of Detroit Stadium	10,000	Recap	
3	October 9	at Pittsburgh Pirates	**W** 17–6	1–2	Forbes Field	6,271	Recap	
4	October 13	Chicago Bears	**L** 0–39	1–3	Baker Bowl	20,000	Recap	
5	October 27	at Brooklyn Dodgers	**L** 6–17	1–4	Ebbets Field	20,000	Recap	
6	November 3	at Boston Redskins	**W** 7–6	2–4	Fenway Park	10,000	Recap	
7	November 5	Brooklyn Dodgers	**L** 0–3	2–5	Baker Bowl	10,000	Recap	
8	November 10	at Chicago Cardinals	**L** 3–12	2–6	Wrigley Field	6,000	Recap	
9	November 17	Boston Redskins	**cancelled**	—	—	—	—	
10	November 24	at New York Giants	**L** 0–10	2–7	Polo Grounds	10,000	Recap	
11	December 1	New York Giants	**L** 14–21	2–8	Baker Bowl	6,500	Recap	
12	December 8	Green Bay Packers	**L** 6–13	2–9	Baker Bowl	4,000	Recap	
Note: Intra-division opponents are in **bold** text.

== Standings ==
NFL Eastern Division
	W	L	T	PCT	DIV	PF	PA	STK
New York Giants	9	3	0	.750	8–0	180	96	W5
Brooklyn Dodgers	5	6	1	.455	3–4–1	90	141	T1
Pittsburgh Pirates	4	8	0	.333	3–5	100	209	L3
Boston Redskins	2	8	1	.200	2–4–1	65	123	T1
Philadelphia Eagles	2	9	0	.182	2–5	60	179	L5

Note: Tie games were not officially counted in the standings until 1972.

== Playoffs ==
The Eagles failed to make the playoffs

== Roster ==
(All time List of Philadelphia Eagles players in franchise history)

No.	Player	Age	Pos.	GP	GS	Weight	Height	Years	College
	Lud Wray	41	Coach	_{1935 record} 2–9	_{As Eagles Coach} 9–21–1	_{NFL Lifetime} 13–25–3		3rd	Pennsylvania
	Howard Bailey	23	T	1	0	205	6–0	Rookie	Tennessee
	Steve Banas	24	BB-DB	2	0	190	6–0	Rookie	Notre Dame
	Harry Benson	26	G	6	0	218	5–10	Rookie	Western Maryland
	Bill Brian	23	T-C-LB	9	5	210	6–2	Rookie	Gonzaga
	Tom Bushby	24	TB-WB	2	0	200	5–10	1	Kansas State
	Glenn Campbell	31	E	1	0	199	5–11	6	Kansas State Teachers
	Joe Carter	25	E	11	11	201	6–1	2	Austin & SMU
	Paul Cuba	27	T	10	8	212	6–0	2	Pittsburgh
	Dick Frahm	29	WB-T	1	0	195	5–10	3	Nebraska
	Tom Graham	26	G	2	0	210	6–3	Rookie	Temple
	Homer Hanson	25	C-G-LB	1	0	217	6–0	1	Kansas State
	Tom "Swede" Hanson	28	B	11	8	192	6–1	4	Temple
	Carl Jorgensen	24	T	11	2	205	6–0	1	St. Mary's (CA)
	George Kenneally	33	E	8	2	190	6–0	9	St. Bonaventure
	Red Kirkman	30	B	1	1	195	6–1	2	Case Western Reserve and Washington & Jefferson
	Joe Kresky	29	G-T	9	8	215	6–0	3	Wisconsin
	Irv Kupcinet	23	QB	2	1	190	6–1	Rookie	North Dakota & Northwestern
	Rick Lackman	25	HB	11	0	186	5–11	2	None
	Jim Leonard	25	B	11	11	204	6–0	1	Notre Dame
	Jim MacMurdo	26	T-G	4	3	209	6–1	3	Pittsburgh
	Eggs Manske	23	E	10	9	185	6–0	Rookie	Northwestern
	Ed Matesic	28	TB-HB	11	11	198	6–1	1	Pittsburgh
	Forrest McPherson	24	G-C-T	7	3	233	5–11	Rookie	Nebraska
	Max Padlow	23	E	4	0	199	6–1	Rookie	Ohio State
	Alabama Pitts	25	HB	3	0	185	5–10	Rookie	None
	Leo Raskowski	29	T	2	0	219	6–3	3	Ohio State
	Hank Reese	26	C-G	11	11	214	5–11	2	Temple
	Burle Robison	25	E-C	7	0	197	6–4	Rookie	BYU
	Bob Rowe	24	HB	4	0	198	6–0	1	Colgate
	Mike Sebastian	25	HB-WB	4	0	185	5–11	Rookie	Pittsburgh
	Harry Shaub	24	G	1	0	215	5–7	Rookie	Cornell
	Ed Storm	28	B	11	3	195	6–1	1	Santa Clara
	Stumpy Thomason	29	B	7	7	189	5–7	5	Georgia Tech
	Izzy Weinstock	22	FB-BB	11	2	190	5–11	Rookie	Pittsburgh
	Clyde Williams	25	T	3	0	210	6–2	Rookie	Georgia Tech
	Diddie Willson	24	G-E-DE	10	10	196	5–10	2	Pennsylvania
	Vince Zizak	27	G-T	4	1	208	5–8	1	Villanova
	Jim Zyntell	25	G	7	4	200	6–1	2	Holy Cross
	38 Players; Team Average	25.3		11		201.6	5–11.8	1.5	
