= 1935 Chicago Cardinals season =

American football team season

- Head coach: Milan Creighton
- Home stadium: Wrigley Field

Results
- Record: 6–4–2
- Division place: 3rd NFL Western
- Playoffs: Did not qualify

The 1935 Chicago Cardinals season marked the franchise's 16th year in the National Football League (NFL). The team improved on their previous output of 5–6, winning six games, but failed to qualify for the league's Championship Playoff.

== Schedule ==
Game	Date	Opponent	Result	Record	Venue	Attendance	Recap	Sources
1	September 15	at **Green Bay Packers**	**W** 7–6	1–0	City Stadium	10,000	Recap	
2	September 29	at **Detroit Lions**	**T** 10–10	1–0–1	Dinan Field	8,200	Recap	
3	October 13	at **Green Bay Packers**	**W** 3–0	2–0–1	State Fair Park	13,000	Recap	
4	October 20	at Pittsburgh Pirates	**L** 13–17	2–1–1	Forbes Field	7,000	Recap	
5	October 27	at New York Giants	**W** 14–13	3–1–1	Polo Grounds	32,000	Recap	
6	November 3	**Detroit Lions**	**L** 6–7	3–2–1	Wrigley Field	5,000	Recap	
7	November 10	Philadelphia Eagles	**W** 12–3	4–2–1	Wrigley Field	6,000	Recap	
8	November 19	at Brooklyn Dodgers	**L** 12–14	4–3–1	Ebbets Field	18,000	Recap	
9	November 24	at Boston Redskins	**W** 6–0	5–3–1	Fenway Park	5,000	Recap	
10	November 28	**Green Bay Packers**	**W** 9–7	6–3–1	Wrigley Field	7,500	Recap	
11	December 1	at **Chicago Bears**	**T** 7–7	6–3–2	Wrigley Field	12,167	Recap	
12	December 8	**Chicago Bears**	**L** 0–13	6–4–2	Wrigley Field	17,373	Recap	
Note: Intra-conference opponents are in **bold** text. Thanksgiving Day: November 28.

== Roster ==
1935 Chicago Cardinals final roster
Backs: 26 Dave Cook RB/CB; 25 Mule Dowell FB/LB; 48 Mike Mikulak FB/LB; 43 Al Nichelini RB/CB; 21 Hal Pangle RB/CB/S; 12 Paul Pardonner RB/S; 30 Ike Petersen RB/CB; 33 Doug Russell RB/CB; 41 Phil Sarboe RB/CB/S	Linemen/Linebackers: 23 Tony Blazine T/DT; 47 Bree Cuppoletti G/DG; 31 Harry Field T/DT; 22 Lou Gordon T/DT; 11 Phil Handler G/DG; 18 Bernie Hughes C/LB; 49 Ted Isaacson T/DT; 19 Peter Mehringer G/DG/T/DT; 46 Bert Pearson C/LB; 27 Howie Tipton G/DG; 44 Billy Volok G/DG	Ends/Receivers: 24 Milan Creighton; 20 Bob Neuman; 40 Bill Smith K; 42 Billy Wilson; rookies in italics

== Standings ==
NFL Western Division
	W	L	T	PCT	DIV	PF	PA	STK
Detroit Lions	7	3	2	.700	3–2–2	191	111	W2
Green Bay Packers	8	4	0	.667	4–4	181	96	W1
Chicago Cardinals	6	4	2	.600	3–2–2	99	97	L1
Chicago Bears	6	4	2	.600	1–3–2	192	106	W1

Note: Tie games were not officially counted in the standings until 1972.
