= List of NFL annual receiving touchdowns leaders =

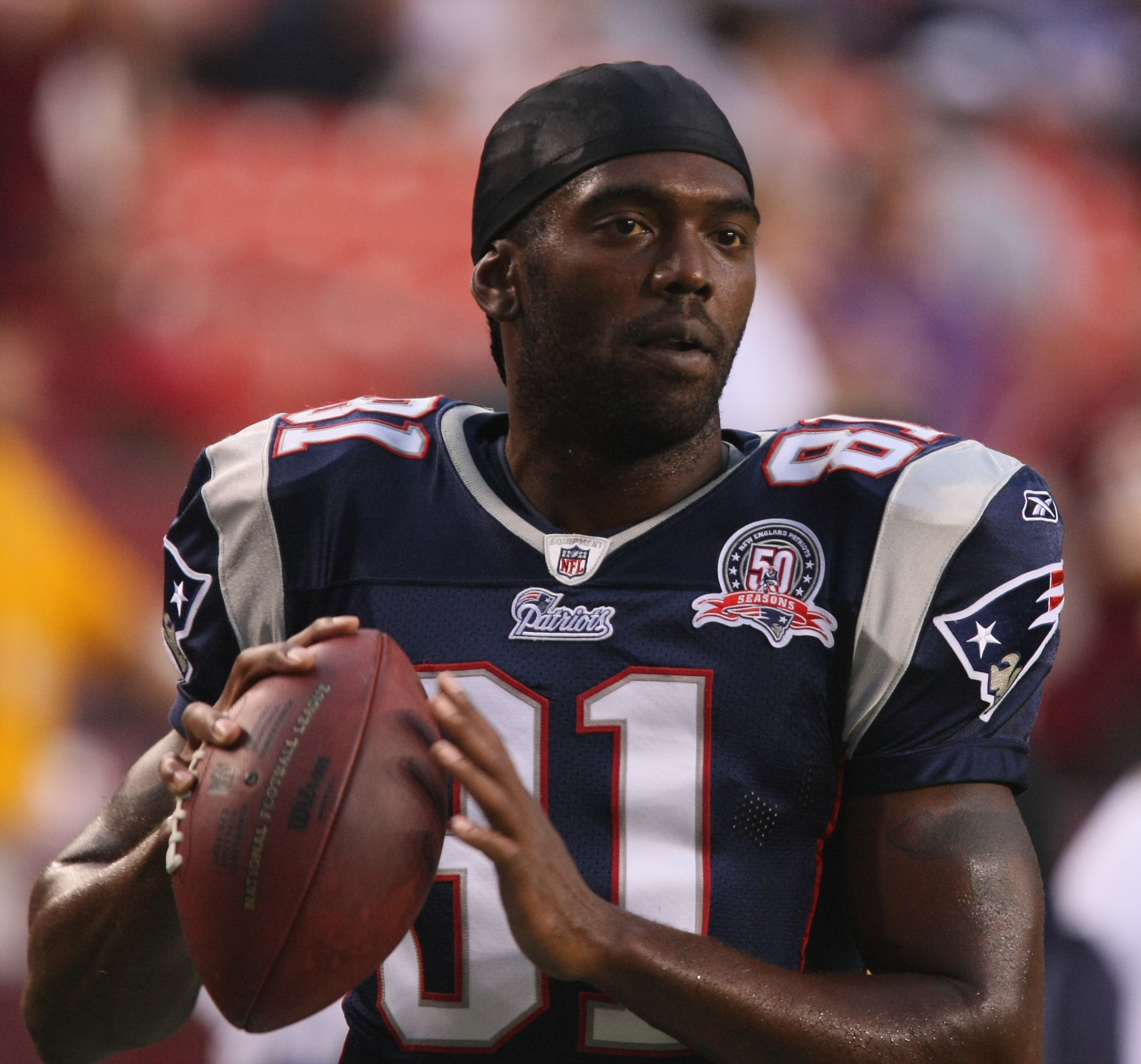
Randy Moss currently holds the single-season touchdown receptions record with 23 in 2007.

In American football, passing, along with running (also referred to as rushing), is one of the two main methods of advancing the ball down the field. Passes are typically attempted by the quarterback, but any offensive player can attempt a pass provided they are behind the line of scrimmage. To qualify as a passing play, the ball must have initially moved forward after leaving the hands of the passer; if the ball initially moved laterally or backwards, the play would instead be considered a running play. A receiving touchdown is scored when a player catches the ball in the field of play and advances it into the end zone, or catches it while already being within the boundaries of the end zone.

The National Football League (NFL) did not begin keeping official records until the 1932 season. Since the adoption of the 14-game season in 1961, only one season (the strike-shortened 1982 season) has had a receiving touchdowns league leader record fewer than 10 touchdown catches. The record for receiving touchdowns in a season is 23, set by Randy Moss during the 2007 season; only one other player (Jerry Rice) has recorded 20 or more receiving touchdowns in a season. In addition to the overall NFL receiving touchdown leaders, league record books recognize the receiving touchdown leaders of the American Football League (AFL), which operated from 1960 to 1969 before being absorbed into the National Football League in 1970. The NFL also recognizes the statistics of the All-America Football Conference, which operated from 1946 to 1949 before three of its teams were merged into the NFL, since 2025.

Don Hutson led the league in receiving touchdowns nine times, the most of any player in league history; Rice ranks second with six league-leading seasons. Hutson also holds the record for the two longest streaks leading the league in receiving touchdowns, doing so for four consecutive seasons (1935 to 1938) and then doing it for five consecutive years from 1940 to 1944.

== NFL annual receiving touchdowns leaders ==
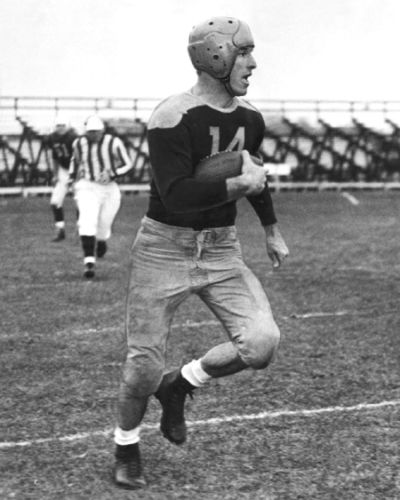
Don Hutson led the NFL in touchdown receptions nine times, the most of any player.

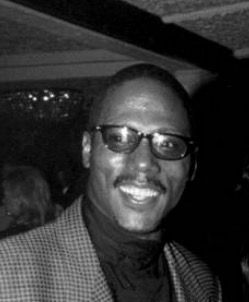
Mark Clayton's 18 touchdown receptions in 1984 broke Don Hutson's 42-year-old record.

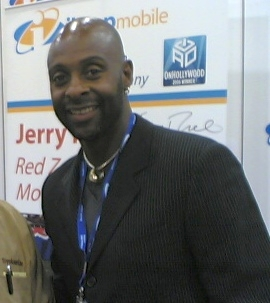
Jerry Rice led the NFL in receiving touchdowns six times.

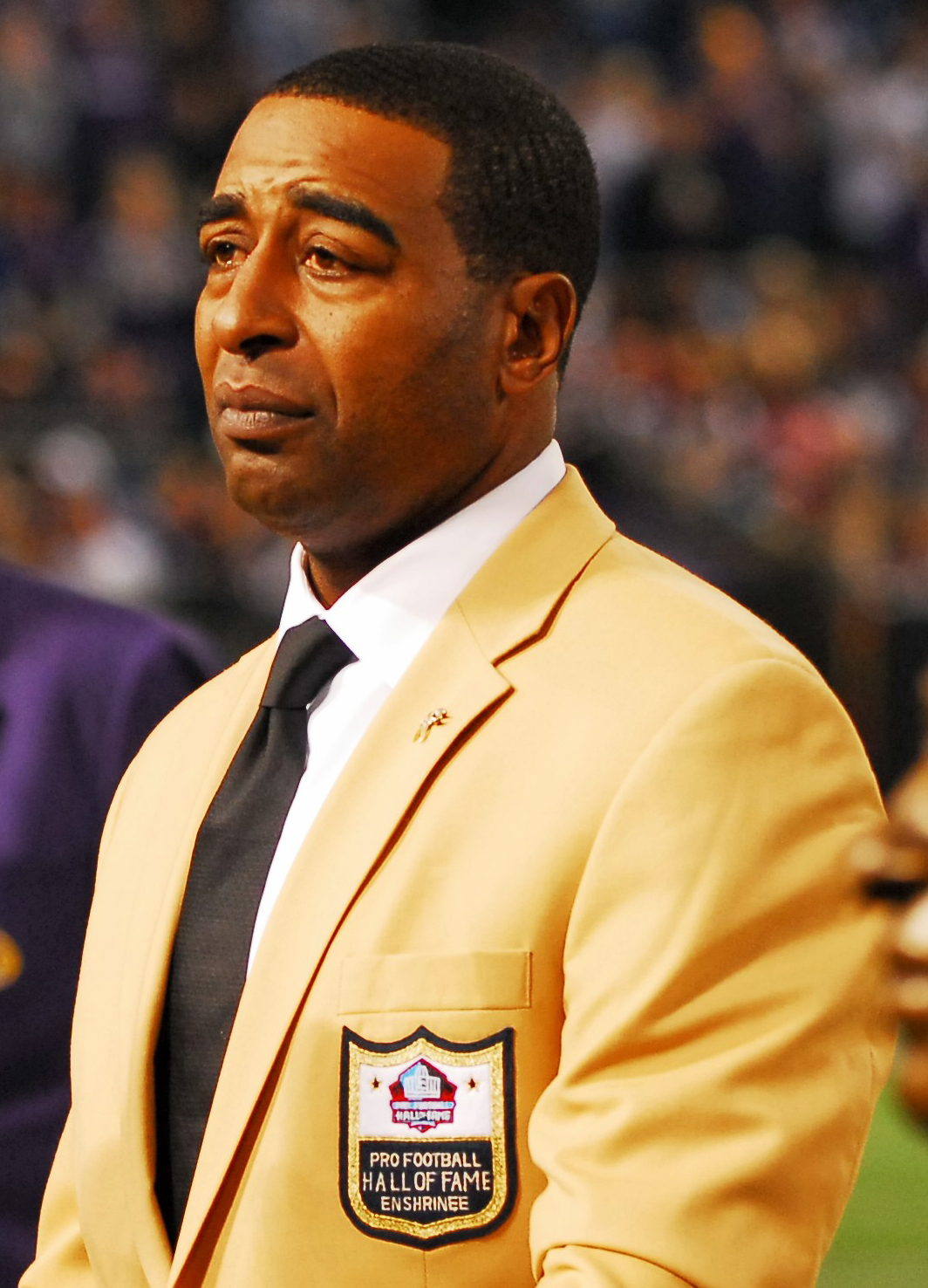
Cris Carter and Minnesota Vikings teammate Randy Moss alternated in winning the title from 1997 to 2000.

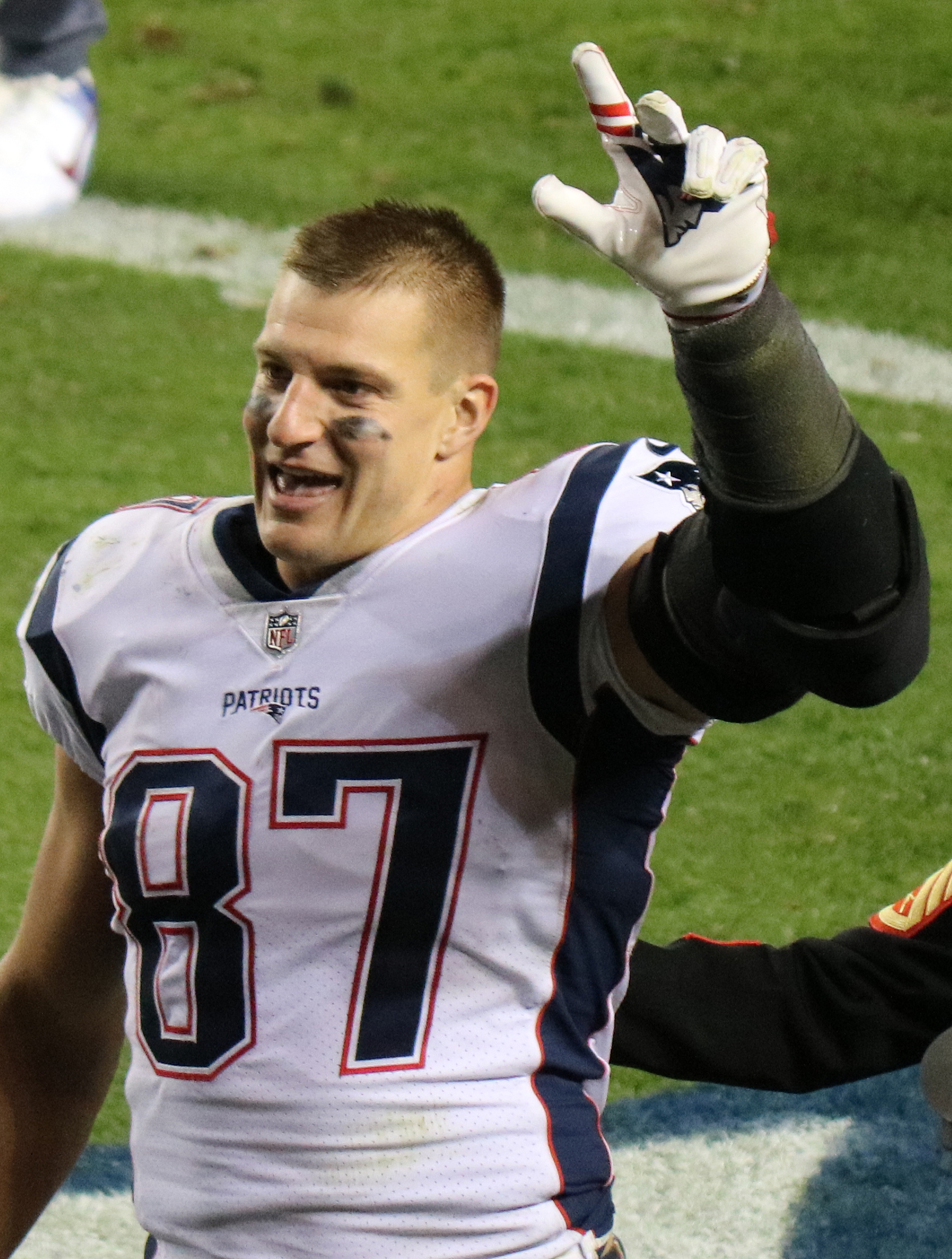
Rob Gronkowski's 17 touchdown receptions in 2011 is the highest single-season total among tight ends.

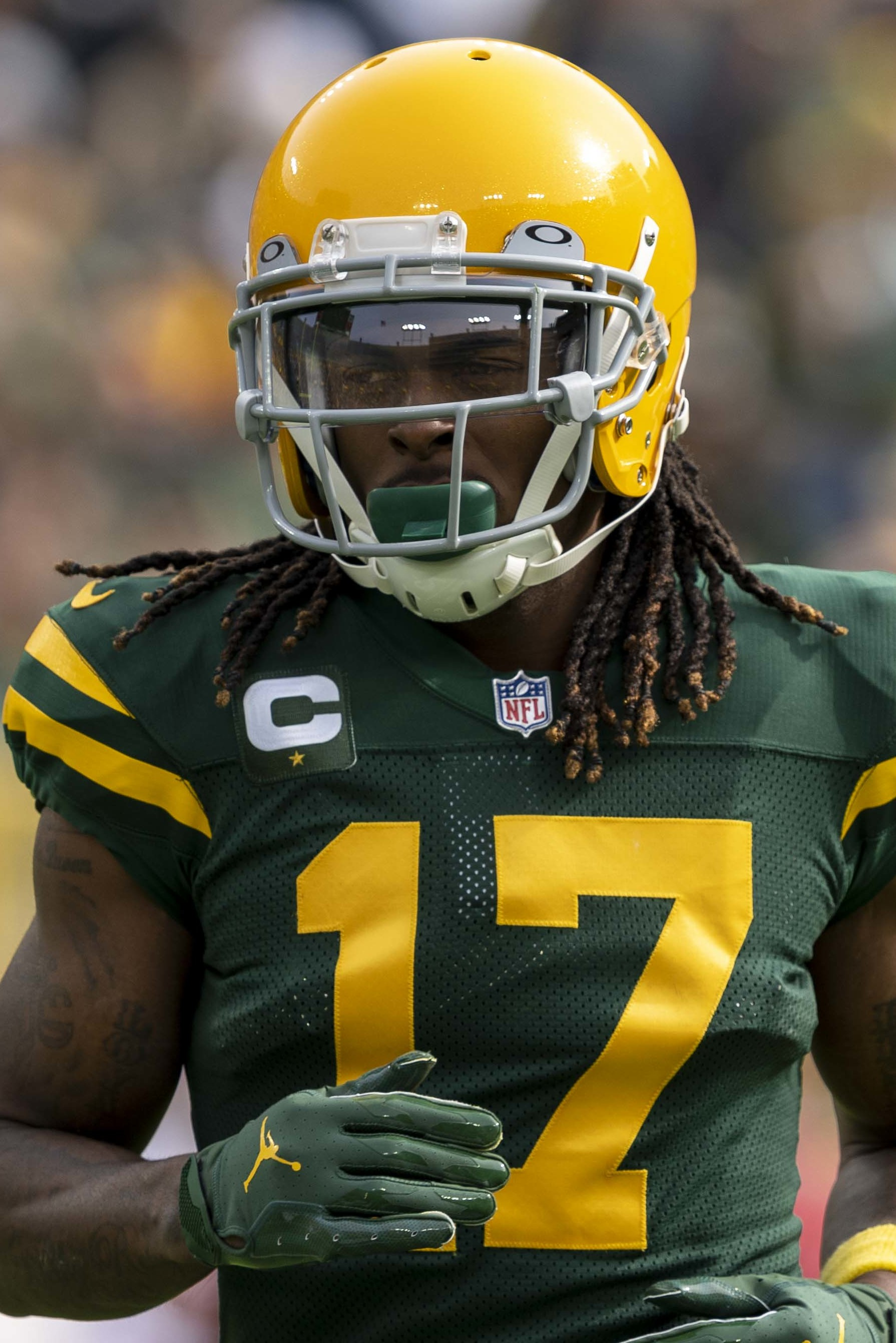
Davante Adams led the NFL in receiving touchdowns in 2020, 2022, and in 2025.

Key
Symbol	Meaning
Leader	The player who recorded the most receiving touchdowns in the NFL
TDs	The total number of receiving touchdowns the player had
GP	The number of games played by a player during the season (Note: The NFL did not have a set number of games for teams to play until the 1935 season, instead setting a minimum.)
†	Inducted into the Pro Football Hall of Fame
^	Active player
*	Set the single-season receiving touchdowns record
(#)	Denotes the number of times a player appears in this list

NFL annual receiving touchdowns leaders by season
Season	Leader	TDs	GP	Team	Refs
1932	Ray Flaherty†	5*	12	New York Giants	
1933	Dale Burnett	3	14	New York Giants	
1933	Ernie Caddel	3	11	Portsmouth Spartans	
1933	Luke Johnsos	3	13	Chicago Bears	
1933	Bill Karr	3	13	Chicago Bears	
1933	Shipwreck Kelly	3	10	Brooklyn Dodgers	
1933	Johnny Blood†	3	13	Green Bay Packers	
1933	Kink Richards	3	14	New York Giants	
1934	Bill Hewitt†	5	13	Chicago Bears	
1935	Don Hutson†	6*	12	Green Bay Packers	
1935	Bill Karr (2)	6*	12	Chicago Bears	
1936	Don Hutson† (2)	8*	12	Green Bay Packers	
1937	Don Hutson† (3)	7	11	Green Bay Packers	
1938	Don Hutson† (4)	9*	11	Green Bay Packers	
1939	Jim Benton	7	11	Cleveland Rams	
1940	Don Hutson† (5)	7	11	Green Bay Packers	
1941	Don Hutson† (6)	10*	11	Green Bay Packers	
1942	Don Hutson† (7)	17*	11	Green Bay Packers	
1943	Don Hutson† (8)	11	10	Green Bay Packers	
1944	Don Hutson† (9)	9	10	Green Bay Packers	
1945	Frank Liebel	10	10	New York Giants	
1946	Billy Dewell	7	11	Chicago Cardinals	
1947	Ken Kavanaugh	13	12	Chicago Bears	
1948	Malcolm Kutner	14	12	Chicago Cardinals	
1949	Tom Fears†	9	12	Los Angeles Rams	
1949	Ken Kavanaugh (2)	9	12	Chicago Bears	
1949	Hugh Taylor	9	12	Washington Redskins	
1950	Bob Shaw	12	12	Chicago Cardinals	
1951	Elroy Hirsch†	17	12	Los Angeles Rams	
1952	Cloyce Box	15	12	Detroit Lions	
1953	Pete Pihos†	10	12	Philadelphia Eagles	
1953	Billy Wilson	10	12	San Francisco 49ers	
1954	Harlon Hill	12	12	Chicago Bears	
1955	Harlon Hill (2)	9	12	Chicago Bears	
1956	Billy Howton	12	12	Green Bay Packers	
1957	Jim Mutscheller	8	12	Baltimore Colts	
1958	Raymond Berry†	9	12	Baltimore Colts	
1958	Tommy McDonald†	9	12	Philadelphia Eagles	
1959	Raymond Berry† (2)	14	12	Baltimore Colts	
1960	Sonny Randle	15	12	St. Louis Cardinals	
1961	Tommy McDonald† (2)	13	14	Philadelphia Eagles	
1962	Frank Clarke	14	14	Dallas Cowboys	
1963	Terry Barr	13	14	Detroit Lions	
1963	Gary Collins	13	14	Cleveland Browns	
1964	Bobby Mitchell†	10	14	Washington Redskins	
1964	Johnny Morris	10	14	Chicago Bears	
1964	Bucky Pope	10	14	Los Angeles Rams	
1965	Bob Hayes†	12	14	Dallas Cowboys	
1965	Dave Parks	12	14	San Francisco 49ers	
1966	Bob Hayes† (2)	13	14	Dallas Cowboys	
1967	Homer Jones	13	14	New York Giants	
1968	Paul Warfield†	12	14	Cleveland Browns	
1969	Lance Rentzel	12	14	Dallas Cowboys	
1970	Dick Gordon	13	14	Chicago Bears	
1971	Paul Warfield† (2)	11	14	Miami Dolphins	
1972	Gene Washington	12	14	San Francisco 49ers	
1973	Harold Jackson	13	14	Los Angeles Rams	
1974	Cliff Branch†	13	14	Oakland Raiders	
1975	Mel Gray	11	14	St. Louis Cardinals	
1975	Lynn Swann†	11	14	Pittsburgh Steelers	
1976	Cliff Branch† (2)	12	14	Oakland Raiders	
1977	Nat Moore	12	14	Miami Dolphins	
1978	John Jefferson	13	16	San Diego Chargers	
1979	Stanley Morgan	12	16	New England Patriots	
1980	John Jefferson (2)	13	16	San Diego Chargers	
1981	Alfred Jenkins	13	16	Atlanta Falcons	
1981	Steve Watson	13	16	Denver Broncos	
1982	Wes Chandler	9	8 (Note: The 1982 season was reduced from 16 to 9 games due to a 57-day players' strike.)	San Diego Chargers	
1983	Roy Green	14	16	St. Louis Cardinals	
1984	Mark Clayton	18*	16	Miami Dolphins	
1985	Daryl Turner	13	16	Seattle Seahawks	
1986	Jerry Rice†	15	16	San Francisco 49ers	
1987	Jerry Rice† (2)	22*	12	San Francisco 49ers	
1988	Mark Clayton (2)	14	16	Miami Dolphins	
1989	Jerry Rice† (3)	17	16	San Francisco 49ers	
1990	Jerry Rice† (4)	13	16	San Francisco 49ers	
1991	Jerry Rice† (5)	14	16	San Francisco 49ers	
1992	Sterling Sharpe†	13	16	Green Bay Packers	
1993	Jerry Rice† (6)	15	16	San Francisco 49ers	
1993	Andre Rison	15	16	Atlanta Falcons	
1994	Sterling Sharpe† (2)	18	16	Green Bay Packers	
1995	Cris Carter†	17	16	Minnesota Vikings	
1995	Carl Pickens	17	16	Cincinnati Bengals	
1996	Michael Jackson	14	16	Baltimore Ravens	
1996	Tony Martin	14	16	San Diego Chargers	
1997	Cris Carter† (2)	13	16	Minnesota Vikings	
1998	Randy Moss†	17	16	Minnesota Vikings	
1999	Cris Carter† (3)	13	16	Minnesota Vikings	
2000	Randy Moss† (2)	15	16	Minnesota Vikings	
2001	Terrell Owens†	16	16	San Francisco 49ers	
2002	Terrell Owens† (2)	13	16	San Francisco 49ers	
2003	Randy Moss† (3)	17	16	Minnesota Vikings	
2004	Muhsin Muhammad	16	16	Carolina Panthers	
2005	Marvin Harrison†	12	16	Indianapolis Colts	
2005	Steve Smith	12	16	Carolina Panthers	
2006	Terrell Owens† (3)	13	16	Dallas Cowboys	
2007	Randy Moss† (4)	23*	16	New England Patriots	
2008	Larry Fitzgerald†	12	16	Arizona Cardinals	
2008	Calvin Johnson†	12	16	Detroit Lions	
2009	Vernon Davis	13	16	San Francisco 49ers	
2009	Larry Fitzgerald† (2)	13	16	Arizona Cardinals	
2009	Randy Moss† (5)	13	16	New England Patriots	
2010	Dwayne Bowe	15	16	Kansas City Chiefs	
2011	Rob Gronkowski	17	16	New England Patriots	
2012	James Jones	14	16	Green Bay Packers	
2013	Jimmy Graham	16	16	New Orleans Saints	
2014	Dez Bryant	16	16	Dallas Cowboys	
2015	Doug Baldwin	14	16	Seattle Seahawks	
2015	Brandon Marshall	14	16	New York Jets	
2015	Allen Robinson	14	16	Jacksonville Jaguars	
2016	Jordy Nelson	14	16	Green Bay Packers	
2017	DeAndre Hopkins	13	15	Houston Texans	
2018	Antonio Brown	15	15	Pittsburgh Steelers	
2019	Kenny Golladay	11	16	Detroit Lions	
2020	Davante Adams^	18	14	Green Bay Packers	
2021	Cooper Kupp^	16	17	Los Angeles Rams	
2022	Davante Adams^ (2)	14	17	Las Vegas Raiders	
2023	Mike Evans^	13	17	Tampa Bay Buccaneers	
2023	Tyreek Hill	13	16	Miami Dolphins	
2024	Ja'Marr Chase^	17	17	Cincinnati Bengals	
2025	Davante Adams^ (3)	14	14	Los Angeles Rams	

== AFL annual receiving touchdowns leaders ==
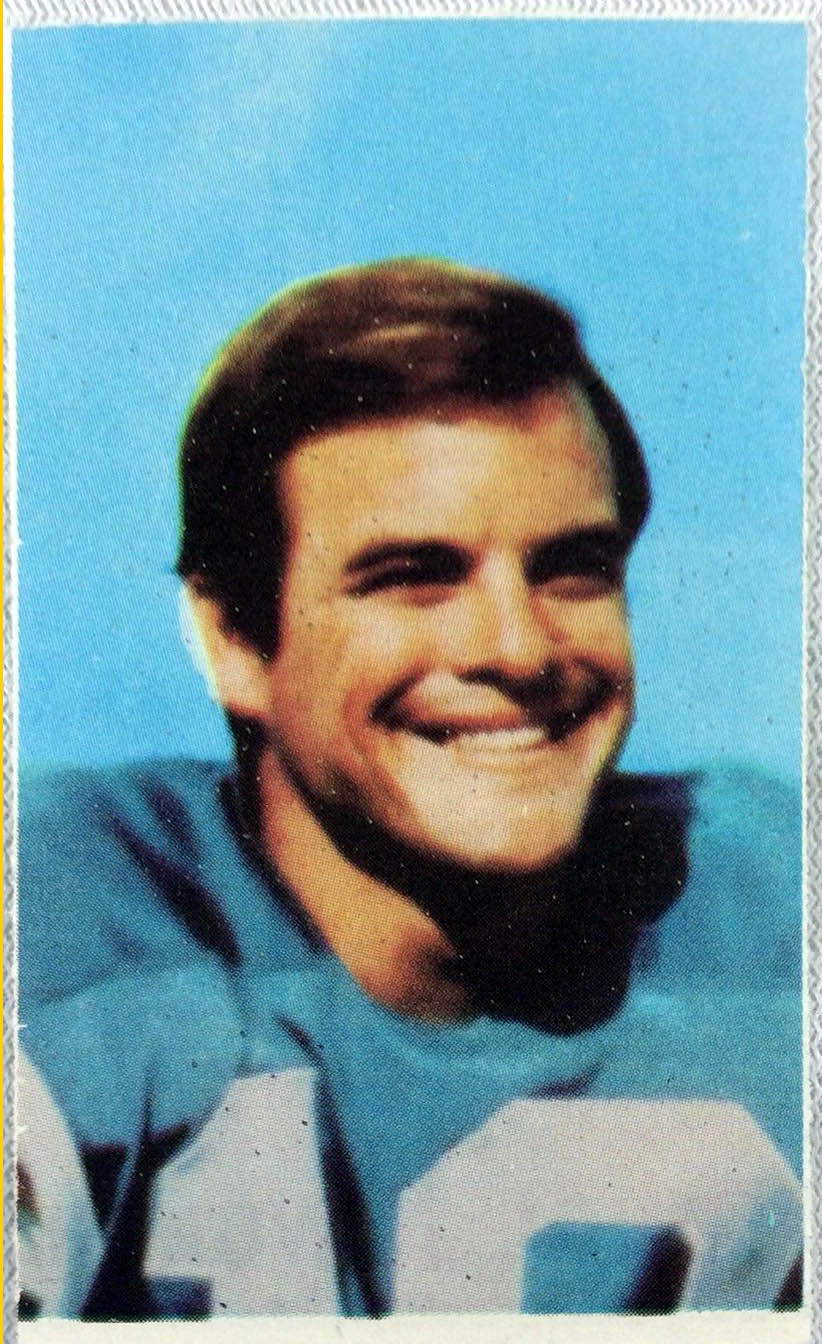
Lance Alworth led the AFL in receiving touchdowns three times, the most in the AFL era. Only four players have led a league in receiving touchdowns more than Alworth.

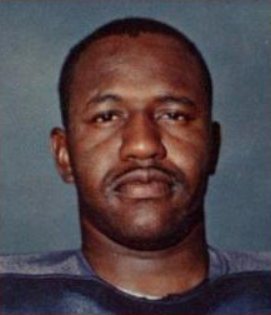
Art Powell (pictured in 1963) was the third man with 80 receiving touchdowns, all of them coming in the AFL from 1960 to 1967.

Key
Symbol	Meaning
Leader	The player who recorded the most receiving touchdowns in the AFL
TDs	The total number of receiving touchdowns the player had
GP	The number of games played by a player during the season
†	Pro Football Hall of Fame member
*	Player set the single-season receiving touchdowns record
(#)	Denotes the number of times a player appears in this list

AFL annual receiving touchdowns leaders by season
Season	Leader	TDs	GP	Team	Refs
1960	Art Powell	14*	14	New York Titans	
1961	Bill Groman	17*	14	Houston Oilers	
1962	Chris Burford	12	14	Dallas Texans	
1963	Art Powell (2)	16	14	Oakland Raiders	
1964	Lance Alworth†	13	14	San Diego Chargers	
1965	Lance Alworth† (2)	14	14	San Diego Chargers	
1965	Don Maynard†	14	14	New York Jets	
1966	Lance Alworth† (3)	13	14	San Diego Chargers	
1967	Al Denson	11	14	Denver Broncos	
1967	Otis Taylor	11	14	Kansas City Chiefs	
1968	Karl Noonan	11	14	Miami Dolphins	
1968	Warren Wells	11	14	Oakland Raiders	
1969	Warren Wells (2)	14	14	Oakland Raiders	

== AAFC annual receiving touchdowns leaders ==
Alyn Beals led the AAFC in all four seasons for receiving touchdowns.

Key
Symbol	Meaning
Player	The player who recorded the most receiving touchdowns in the AAFC
TDs	The total number of receiving touchdowns the player had
GP	The number of games played by the player during the season
*	Player set the single-season receiving touchdowns record
(#)	Denotes the number of times a player appears in this list

AAFC annual receiving touchdowns leaders by season
Season	Player	TDs	GP	Team	Ref.
1946	Alyn Beals	10*	14	San Francisco 49ers	
1947	Alyn Beals (2)	10	13	San Francisco 49ers	
1948	Alyn Beals (3)	14*	14	San Francisco 49ers	
1949	Alyn Beals (4)	12	12	San Francisco 49ers	

== Most seasons leading the league ==
Count	Player	Seasons	Team(s)	Refs
9	Don Hutson	1935–1938, 1940–1944	Green Bay Packers	
6	Jerry Rice	1986, 1987, 1989–1991, 1993	San Francisco 49ers	
5	Randy Moss	1998, 2000, 2003, 2007, 2009	Minnesota Vikings (3) / New England Patriots (2)	
4	Alyn Beals	1946–1949	San Francisco 49ers	
3	Davante Adams	2020, 2022, 2025	Green Bay Packers (1) / Las Vegas Raiders (1) / Los Angeles Rams (1)	
3	Lance Alworth	1964–1966	San Diego Chargers	
3	Cris Carter	1995, 1997, 1999	Minnesota Vikings	
3	Terrell Owens	2001, 2002, 2006	San Francisco 49ers (2) / Dallas Cowboys (1)	
2	Art Powell	1960, 1963	New York Titans (1) / Oakland Raiders (1)	
2	Warren Wells	1968, 1969	Oakland Raiders	
2	Raymond Berry	1958, 1959	Baltimore Colts	
2	Cliff Branch	1974, 1976	Oakland Raiders	
2	Mark Clayton	1984, 1988	Miami Dolphins	
2	Larry Fitzgerald	2008, 2009	Arizona Cardinals	
2	Bob Hayes	1965, 1966	Dallas Cowboys	
2	Harlon Hill	1954, 1955	Chicago Bears	
2	John Jefferson	1978, 1980	San Diego Chargers	
2	Bill Karr	1933, 1935	Chicago Bears	
2	Ken Kavanaugh	1947, 1949	Chicago Bears	
2	Tommy McDonald	1958, 1961	Philadelphia Eagles	
2	Sterling Sharpe	1992, 1994	Green Bay Packers	
2	Paul Warfield	1968, 1971	Cleveland Browns (1) / Miami Dolphins	

== See also ==
- List of NFL career receiving touchdowns leaders
- List of NFL annual receiving yards leaders
- List of NFL annual receptions leaders
- List of NFL annual rushing touchdowns leaders
- List of NFL annual passing touchdowns leaders
- List of NFL annual scoring leaders
