= 1935 Chicago Bears season =

NFL team season

- Head coach: George Halas
- Home stadium: Wrigley Field

Results
- Record: 6–4–2
- Division place: T-3rd NFL Western
- Playoffs: Did not qualify

The 1935 season was the Chicago Bears' 16th in the National Football League and 13th season under head coach George Halas. The team was unable to match on their 13–0 record from 1934 and finished with a 6–4–2 record and finishing in a tie for third (and last) place in the Western Division, and failed to return to the championship game. The Bears had little trouble with the weaker teams in the league, led the league in scoring, and occasionally showed signs of brilliance against top-flight competition, but for the most part, they were outclassed by the Lions, Packers, and Giants.

The biggest problem was the veterans from the 1920s had largely retired or were past their prime but not enough young talent had emerged to offset these losses. In particular, the retirement of Link Lyman and Red Grange hurt the team, especially on defense. Additionally, Bronko Nagurski and Bill Hewitt were injured for large portions of the season and could not play to their normal level. Their record of missing the playoffs after going undefeated in the regular season the previous year would eventually be broken by the 2008 New England Patriots.

== Season highlights ==
Keith Molesworth was the brightest spot on offense and was a triple threat from the halfback position. Bernie Masterson ran the T-formation adequately but was not particularly accurate as a passer. Luke Johnsos was the most reliable end and led the team in receptions. Gene Ronzani led the club in rushing, but Feathers, Molesworth, and Manders shared rushing duties. Manders had a subpar year as a kicker, making only 1 of 8 field goals. The Bears lost to Green Bay twice, to Detroit once (tying the Lions in the other game), split the series with New York, and beat the Redskins in their only meeting.

After a 5–2 start, the Bears faded in the end, winning only 1 of their last 5 games, with one tie. Of note, every other team in the NFL ran either the Single Wing or the A Formation (a variant of the Single Wing run only by the Giants), but the Bears still used the T formation. Many today falsely believe the Bears of the 1940s "invented" the modern T and then everyone adopted it. The truth is everyone ran the T when the league began in 1920. All the other teams switched to the Single Wing after it was perfected in the college game. Meanwhile, coach George Halas and his assistants perfected the T, which they never changed from, and other teams switched back from the Single Wing only after the Bears of the 1940s demonstrated the T's superiority.

== Schedule ==
Game	Date	Opponent	Result	Record	Venue	Attendance	Recap	Sources
1	September 22	at **Green Bay Packers**	**L** 0–7	0–1	City Stadium	13,600	Recap	
2	September 29	at Pittsburgh Pirates	**W** 23–7	1–1	Forbes Field	11,858	Recap	
3	October 13	at Philadelphia Eagles	**W** 39–0	2–1	Baker Bowl	20,000	Recap	
4	October 20	Brooklyn Dodgers	**W** 24–14	3–1	Wrigley Field	18,000	Recap	
5	October 27	**Green Bay Packers**	**L** 14–17	3–2	Wrigley Field	29,386	Recap	
6	November 3	at New York Giants	**W** 20–3	4–2	Polo Grounds	40,000	Recap	
7	November 10	at Boston Redskins	**W** 30–14	5–2	Fenway Park	16,000	Recap	
8	November 17	New York Giants	**L** 0–3	5–3	Wrigley Field	19,000	Recap	
9	November 24	**Detroit Lions**	**T** 20–20	5–3–1	Wrigley Field	14,624	Recap	
10	November 28	at **Detroit Lions**	**L** 2–14	5–4–1	Titan Stadium	18,000	Recap	
11	December 1	**Chicago Cardinals**	**T** 7–7	5–4–2	Wrigley Field	12,167	Recap	
12	December 8	**Chicago Cardinals**	**W** 13–0	6–4–2	Wrigley Field	17,373	Recap	
Note: Intra-division opponents are in **bold** text. Thanksgiving: November 28.

== Standings ==
Program for a preseason game between the Bears and the Calumet All-Stars.

NFL Western Division
	W	L	T	PCT	DIV	PF	PA	STK
Detroit Lions	7	3	2	.700	3–2–2	191	111	W2
Green Bay Packers	8	4	0	.667	4–4	181	96	W1
Chicago Cardinals	6	4	2	.600	3–2–2	99	97	L1
Chicago Bears	6	4	2	.600	1–3–2	192	106	W1

Note: Tie games were not officially counted in the standings until 1972.

== Roster ==
=== Future Hall of Fame players ===
- Bill Hewitt, end
- George Musso, tackle
- Bronko Nagurski, fullback

=== Other leading players ===
- Beattie Feathers, halfback
- Luke Johnsos, end
- Bill Karr, end
- Joe Kopcha, guard
- Jack Manders, fullback/kicker
- Bernie Masterson, quarterback
- Keith Molesworth, halfback
- Gene Ronzani, back

=== Players departed from 1934 ===
- Carl Brumbaugh, quarterback (did not play for unknown reasons)
- Red Grange, back (retired)
- Walt Kiesling, guard (signed by Packers)
- Link Lyman, tackle (retired)
