= Paul Pardonner =

American football player (1910–1989)

No. 12
- Position: Blocking back

Personal information
- Born: April 29, 1910; Ingomar, Ohio, U.S.
- Died: February 14, 1989 (aged 78); Columbus, Ohio, U.S.
- Listed height: 5 ft 8 in (1.73 m)
- Listed weight: 170 lb (77 kg)

Career information
- High school: Middletown (Middletown, Ohio)
- College: Purdue

Career history
- Chicago Cardinals (1934–1935)
- Stats at Pro Football Reference

Paul Franklin Pardonner (April 29, 1910 – February 14, 1989) was an American professional football player who was a blocking back for the Chicago Cardinals of the National Football League (NFL). He played college football for the Purdue Boilermakers, and was noted for his drop kicking ability.

== Early life ==
Paul Franklin Pardonner was born on April 29, 1910, in Ingomar, Ohio. He was a three-sport star (football, basketball, and track) at Middletown High School in Middletown, Ohio. He also attended Cheshire Academy in Cheshire, Connecticut.

== College career ==
Pardonner played college football for the Purdue Boilermakers, and was a three-year varsity letterman from 1931 to 1933 as a quarterback. He was noted for his drop kicking ability; an October 1933 Associated Press (AP) article said that Pardonner "hasn't carried the ball more than a half dozen times in three seasons of stardom for the Boilermakers" because he was too valuable as a drop kicker. The AP also stated Pardonner was the "outstanding 'pinch hitter' of big time football". Through the second game of the 1933 season, he had made 23 of 25 extra point drop kicks during his varsity career. The two misses did not affect the outcome of any games. Pardonner studied science at Purdue. He was selected to play in the 1933 East–West Shrine Game.

== Professional career ==
Pardonner signed with the Chicago Cardinals on July 19, 1934. He played in six games, starting three, during the 1934 season, scoring one field goal and catching one pass for one yard. He appeared in nine games, starting five, for Chicago in 1935, totaling one made field goal, one made extra point, one completion on five passing attempts for six yards and three interceptions, two receptions for 44 yards, and four rushes for -14 yards. His drop kick field goal on October 13, 1935, was the only score in the Cardinals' 3–0 victory over the Green Bay Packers. Pardonner suffered a shoulder injury late in the 1935 season. A February 1936 article in the Honolulu Star-Advertiser said that Pardonner and Dutch Clark were the only drop kickers in the NFL. Pardonner retired from the NFL in 1936 for a job at a Middletown industrial plant.

== Personal life ==
Pardonner died on February 14, 1989, in Columbus, Ohio.
