= Ray Fuqua =

American football player (1911–1947)

- Fuqua in 1936

No. 23
- Positions: End, defensive end

Personal information
- Born: March 21, 1912; Center, Texas, U.S.
- Died: October 26, 1983 (aged 71); Houston, Texas, U.S.
- Listed height: 6 ft 0 in (1.83 m)
- Listed weight: 190 lb (86 kg)

Career information
- College: SMU

Career history
- Brooklyn Dodgers (1935–1936)

Awards and highlights
- All-Southwestern Conference (1934); SMU All-1930s Team

Career statistics
- Games played: 22
- Starts: 16
- Receptions: 9
- Yards receiving: 84
- Touchdowns: 1
- Stats at Pro Football Reference

Raymond Earl Fuqua (March 21, 1912 – October 26, 1983) was an American football end that played for the Brooklyn Dodgers of the National Football League (NFL) in 1935 and 1936. Fuqua played collegiately at Southern Methodist University.

== Biography ==
=== Early life ===
Ray Fuqua was born March 21, 1912, in Center, Texas, a town of fewer than 2,000 people located about 20 miles from the Louisiana border. He grew up in Shreveport, Louisiana.

Fuqua played sports in Shreveport YMCA leagues starting in 1927, pitching for the "White Sox" baseball team and playing right end for the "Navy" football squad.

=== College career ===
Fuqua attended Southern Methodist University and was a member of the varsity in 1932, 1933, and 1934. SMU fielded a very poor team in 1932, finishing with a record of 1–4–1 in the Southwest Conference (3–7–2 overall) — a season in which the highlight was a 21–14 loss to Nebraska.

Fuqua was elected team captain for the 1933 season. Again, SMU proved less than successful on the field, finishing the year with a record of 2–4 in conference (4–7–1 overall), sixth out of seven teams in the Southwest Conference.

The two-time SMU captain made a name for himself on a national stage as a senior in 1934, when he made catches to help SMU defeat the powerful Fordham University Rams. "The New Yorkers were almost completely snowed under by flying footballs thrown by the Mustangs," sportswriter Joe Utay approvingly noted, allowing the Dallas visitors to sweep to a 26–14 victory at the venerable Polo Grounds.

While the 1934 team still managed only a third-place finish in the Southwest Conference with a record of 3–2–1, the overall record was excellent, with 8 wins and 2 ties, against only 2 losses.

Following the conclusion of the 1934 college football season, Fuqua played in the East-West All-Star game and in the College All-Star Game against the world champion Chicago Bears.

The year after Fuqua's graduation, SMU would run the table during the regular season, finishing 12–0 before losing to Stanford in the 1936 Rose Bowl, 7–0.

=== Professional career ===
As there was no player draft in the National Football League before 1936 NFL draft, independent talent scouting and free agent contracts were the norm in the league during prior years. Fuqua signed a contract to play with the Brooklyn Dodgers of the NFL in 1935. Going in, he planned on playing in the league for two years before leaving to enter the cotton business in Dallas. This is exactly what he did, playing for the Dodgers in the 1935 and 1936 seasons.

During his two years in the NFL, Fuqua played in 22 games for the Dodgers, starting 16 times. He played both offense and defense in this era of the one-platoon system, catching a total of 9 passes for 84 yards and 1 touchdown in his career.

=== Life after football ===
In 1946, with World War II at an end, Fuqua moved to Ballinger, Texas, and worked as an automobile dealer.

=== Death and legacy ===
Fuqua died October 26, 1983, in Houston, Texas, after a short illness. He was survived by his wife, the former Juliette Adams, whom he married in 1937, as well as a son and a daughter. At the time of his death he was remembered by Doug Cox, school superintendent of Balliger for his generosity in providing money for educational scholarships. "He was very well-liked and a very generous person," Cox said.

Fuqua was named a member of the All-1930s team by Southern Methodist University.
