= Ingomar =

Ingomar may refer to:

== People ==
- Inguiomer or Ingomar, uncle of Arminius (fl. AD 15)

== Arts ==
- Ingomar the Barbarian (play), an 1851 play by Maria Ann Lovell
- Ingomar, an opera by Colin McAlpin about the historical character
- Ingomar, the Barbarian, a 1908 silent film

== Places ==
- Ingomar, California
- Ingomar, Mississippi
- Ingomar, Montana
- Ingomar, Nova Scotia, Canada
- Ingomar, Ohio

== Organizations ==
- Ingomar Club, a private club in Eureka, California
