= 1935 Boston Redskins season =

NFL team season

- Owner: George Preston Marshall
- General manager: Dennis J. Shea
- Head coach: Eddie Casey
- Home stadium: Fenway Park

Results
- Record: 2–8–1
- Division place: 4th NFL Eastern
- Playoffs: Did not qualify

The 1935 Boston Redskins season was the franchise's 4th season in the National Football League . The team finished with a record of two wins, eight losses, and one tie, and finished in fourth place in the Eastern Division of the National Football League. They failed to qualify for the playoffs for the fourth consecutive season. A road game against the Philadelphia Eagles scheduled for November 17 was canceled due to snow and rain. This would be the last time the Boston Redskins and its successor in Washington would lose to Detroit at home until 2013.

== Schedule ==
Game	Date	Opponent	Result	Record	Venue	Attendance	Recap	Sources
1	September 29	**Brooklyn Dodgers**	**W** 7–3	1–0	Fenway Park	18,000	Recap	
2	October 6	**New York Giants**	**L** 12–20	1–1	Fenway Park	8,000	Recap	
3	October 13	Detroit Lions	**L** 7–17	1–2	Fenway Park	18,737	Recap	
4	October 20	at **New York Giants**	**L** 6–17	1–3	Polo Grounds	20,000	Recap	
5	October 27	at **Pittsburgh Pirates**	**L** 0–6	1–4	Forbes Field	12,000	Recap	
6	October 30	at Detroit Lions	**L** 0–14	1–5	Dinan Field	14,000	Recap	
7	November 3	**Philadelphia Eagles**	**L** 6–7	1–6	Fenway Park	10,000	Recap	
8	November 10	Chicago Bears	**L** 14–30	1–7	Fenway Park	16,000	Recap	
9	November 17	at **Philadelphia Eagles**	**canceled**	—	Baker Bowl	—	—	
10	November 24	Chicago Cardinals	**L** 0–6	1–8	Fenway Park	5,000	Recap	
11	December 1	**Pittsburgh Pirates**	**W** 13–3	2–8	Fenway Park	5,000	Recap	
12	December 8	at **Brooklyn Dodgers**	**T** 0–0	2–8–1	Ebbets Field	5,000	Recap	
Note: Intra-division opponents are in **bold** text.

== Roster ==
1935 Boston Redskins final roster
Backs: 20 Cliff Battles RB/CB/S; 12 Dick Frahm RB/CB; 26 Steve Hokuf RB/S; 14 Hal McPhail FB/LB; 25 Jim Musick FB/LB/K; 33 Doug Nott RB/S; 11 Erny Pinckert RB/CB/S; 31 Pug Rentner RB/CB/S/K; 16 Heinie Weisenbaugh RB/CB	Linemen/Linebackers: 15 Jim Barber T/DT; 24 Frank Bausch C/LB; 28 Rick Concannon G/DG; 17 Turk Edwards T/DT; 18 Eddie Kahn G/DG; 23 Jim Moran G/DG; 22 Gail O'Brien T/DT; 21 Les Olsson G/DG; 27 Larry Siemering C/LB; 34 Steve Sinko T/DT	Ends/Receivers: 32 Paul Collins; 19 Charley Malone; 30 Flavio Tosi; Reserve: Frank Walton G/DG (inactive); rookies in italics

== Standings ==
NFL Eastern Division
	W	L	T	PCT	DIV	PF	PA	STK
New York Giants	9	3	0	.750	8–0	180	96	W5
Brooklyn Dodgers	5	6	1	.455	3–4–1	90	141	T1
Pittsburgh Pirates	4	8	0	.333	3–5	100	209	L3
Boston Redskins	2	8	1	.200	2–4–1	65	123	T1
Philadelphia Eagles	2	9	0	.182	2–5	60	179	L5

Note: Tie games were not officially counted in the standings until 1972.
