= Art Strutt =

American football player (1912–)

No. 44
- Position: Halfback

Personal information
- Born: December 4, 1912; Mingo Junction, Ohio, U.S.
- Died: January 2, 1993 (aged 80)
- Listed height: 6 ft 0 in (1.83 m)
- Listed weight: 202 lb (92 kg)

Career information
- High school: Mingo
- College: Duquesne

Career history
- Pittsburgh Pirates (1935–1936)
- Stats at Pro Football Reference

Arthur Eugene Strott (December 4, 1912 – January 2, 1993), better known as Art Strutt, was an American football player. He played college football for the Duquesne Dukes and professionally for the Pittsburgh Pirates of the National Football League (NFL). He also played minor league baseball.

== Early life ==
Arthur Eugene Strott was born on December 4, 1912, in Mingo Junction, Ohio. He attended Mingo High School.

== College career ==
Strutt enrolled at Duquesne University to play college football for the Dukes. When he registered at Duquesne, his last name was mistakenly put down as Strutt. He was on the freshmen team in 1931 and the varsity team from 1932 to 1934. Strutt was a team co-captain in 1934. In November 1934, he scored four touchdowns in two straight games. Through November 19, 1934, he was leading the nation in scoring with 102 points. Strutt ultimately finished the season with 108 points, the third-most in the country. Strutt also boxed at Duquesne.

== Professional football career ==
Strutt played in 19 games, starting 10, for the Pittsburgh Pirates of the National Football League (NFL) from 1935 to 1936, recording 130 carries for 291 yards and one touchdown, 18 receptions for 278 yards, and one interception return touchdown. He led the team in yards from scrimmage during the 1935 season with 223 yards.

== Baseball career ==
Strutt played several years of amateur and semi-pro baseball. In January 1935, it was reported that the Pittsburgh Pirates of the National League were hoping to sign Strutt to a contract. He played for the Pirates' Class-C affiliate, the Hutchinson Larks, from 1936 to 1937 as an outfielder and third basemen. Strutt played in 240 total games for the Larks, batting for a .333 average, 46 home runs, and 218 runs batted in. In February 1937, Strutt decided to focus full-time on baseball with hopes to make the majors. He later played in the PONY League.

== Coaching career ==
Strutt was an assistant football coach at Niagara University for several years. He was an assistant coach for the 1942 Fort Knox Armoraiders football team. He scouted the New York Giants on behalf of the Detroit Lions for the Giants–Lions preseason game on September 12, 1943.

== Personal life ==
Strutt died on January 2, 1993.
