= Ed Storm =

American football player and coach (1907–1950)

- Storm in 1935

No. 22, 1
- Position: Halfback

Personal information
- Born: October 2, 1907; Salinas, California, U.S.
- Died: June 4, 1950 (aged 42) near Moss Landing, California, U.S.
- Listed height: 6 ft 1 in (1.85 m)
- Listed weight: 197 lb (89 kg)

Career information
- High school: Salinas (Salinas, California)
- College: Santa Clara (1929–1930)

Career history

Playing
- San Luis Obispo (1932); Memphis Tigers (1933); Philadelphia Eagles (1934–1935); Salinas Iceberg Packers (1936–1938); Oakland Oaks (1939); San Diego Bombers (1941–1942); San Diego Gunners (1944)

Coaching
- Salinas Iceberg Packers (1936–1938); Northern California All-Stars (1939); Oakland Oaks (1939); Kenny Washington's All-Stars (1939); San Diego Bombers (1941–1943); San Diego Gunners (1944); San Diego Tigers (1945)

Operations
- Salinas Iceberg Packers (1936–1938) General manager / owner

Career NFL statistics
- Rushing attempts: 165
- Rushing yards: 445
- Touchdowns: 2
- Passing attempts: 74
- Passing completions: 23
- Passing yards: 469
- TD–INT: 3–16
- Stats at Pro Football Reference

Edward Charles Storm (October 2, 1907 – June 4, 1950) was an American professional football halfback and coach. From Salinas, California, he played college football for the Santa Clara Broncos for one season. Afterwards, he played professional football locally and then with a team in Memphis, Tennessee. He joined the Philadelphia Eagles of the National Football League (NFL) and played two seasons with them, being their leading passer in 1935. Storm later returned to California where he played for and coached a number of teams over the next decade.

Storm founded the Salinas Iceberg Packers, the first football team based in the city, and ran it for three seasons as a player-coach. He played for and coached multiple all-star teams and was head coach of the Oakland Oaks, the first professional team based in Oakland, in 1939. He became a player-coach for the San Diego Bombers of the Pacific Coast Professional Football League (PCFL) in 1941, coaching them for three seasons and playing in two, while leading them to two league championships. He then coached two other San Diego-based teams from 1944 to 1945 to conclude his career. He died in a car crash in 1950, at age 42.

== Early life ==
Storm was born on October 2, 1907, in Salinas, California. His brothers Leo and Connie both also played professional football, the latter captaining the Santa Clara Broncos football team. Ed grew up playing football and was also an amateur boxer. He attended Salinas High School where he played football in the backfield, with the Oakland Tribune calling him a "youthful giant who seldom failed to gain through the line." He and his brother Leo were described as the "outstanding players" for the 1926 season, and Storm graduated in 1927.

In 1927, Storm played for the Salinas Athletic Club football team. He then played for the San Francisco Young Men's Institute (YMI) football team in 1928, being one of their top runners. That season, the YMI football team played against the Pop Warner-led Stanford Cardinal. In the final seconds of a scoreless tie, Storm, playing safety, intercepted a pass from Stanford and ran it back 97 yards for a game-winning touchdown. He also kicked the extra point, prompting a writer for The Oakland Post Enquirer to gush, "I doubt very much if Mr. Red Grange could have climaxed a football show more fittingly than did Eddie Storm." Storm also played baseball locally for a Castroville team.

== College career ==
Storm enrolled at Santa Clara University in 1929, although he was ineligible to play for its Broncos football team that year. He made the varsity football team in 1930, and after impressing against California in the second game of the season, was named Santa Clara's starting quarterback for the Broncos' game against Stanford. Weighing 190 pounds (86 kg), Storm was also used as a halfback and punter in addition to quarterback. He was later shifted to be the starting right halfback at the start of November. Described as a "triple threat man of high caliber," he helped the Broncos compile a record of 5–3–1 during the 1930 season. In addition to football, Storm pitched and played first base for the Santa Clara baseball team. He was declared ineligible for the 1931 season due to academic issues.

== Professional career ==
=== Early career ===
After being ruled ineligible at Santa Clara, Storm began playing for a team in San Luis Obispo, California, in 1932. The following year, he played professional football for the Memphis Tigers in Tennessee. As their starting quarterback, he was noted for his ability to "heave the oval with accuracy between 40 and 55 yards." The Tigers were one of the top independent professional football teams at the time and often played against teams in the National Football League (NFL). He served as team captain for the Tigers and their placekicker, finishing the season having scored 59 points, including being 20 for 22 on extra point attempts.

=== Philadelphia Eagles ===
To stay in shape during the offseason, Storm worked packing railroad refrigerator cars, "hoisting boxes of salad 100 or 150 pounds into freight cars." On August 22, 1934, he signed to play for the Philadelphia Eagles of the NFL. He was used as a quarterback and halfback, and made his NFL debut in the team's season-opening 19–6 loss to the Green Bay Packers, running one time for three yards. He then ran eight times for 25 yards in their subsequent game against the Pittsburgh Pirates, before scoring his first Eagles touchdown in their exhibition win against the Reading Keys on September 30. Storm caught his first pass, a 12-yard reception, and threw his first two passes, both of which were intercepted, in the Eagles' third NFL game of the season, a loss in a rematch to the Pirates.

Storm completed his first pass, for three yards, on six attempts in the team's fourth game, against the Detroit Lions, and then completed two of ten passes for 55 yards and an interception the next week against the Boston Redskins. Two weeks later, he played a part in the Eagles' historic 64–0 win against the Cincinnati Reds, running seven times for 61 yards and opening the scoring with his first NFL touchdown on a 36-yard rush in the first quarter. The Eagles' win over the Reds remains the largest regular season shutout in NFL history, and the Reds folded a few days after the game.

Halfback Ed Storm featured on the cover of this 1934 Philadelphia Eagles program.

Storm ran for over 25 yards in each of the team's remaining games and scored a touchdown in their 13–0 victory against the Brooklyn Dodgers. He closed out the season with a 53-yard rushing performance against the New York Giants, with the Eagles ending the season with a record of 4–7. Overall, Storm totaled 81 rush attempts for 281 yards and two touchdowns, caught five passes for 34 yards, and completed 8-of-30 pass attempts for 97 yards and six interceptions, finishing 10th in the NFL that stat.

Following the NFL season, Storm signed with the Ernie Nevers's Pacific Coast All-Stars and played in their exhibition game against the New York Giants, which the All-Stars lost by a score of 21–0. He later returned to the Philadelphia Eagles for the 1935 season. He ran for 23 yards in the season-opener, a loss to Pittsburgh, then two games later helped beat Pittsburgh by running for 43 yards and completing two of seven passes for 87 yards and his first career passing touchdown, which came on a 58-yard toss to Joe Carter. He threw his second career touchdown pass in the sixth game of the season, which was a 55-yard completion to Edgar Manske in the second quarter which was the margin of victory in their 7–6 win against the Boston Redskins. He threw his third touchdown of the season, a 59-yarder against the New York Giants in the Eagles' 10th game, his only completion in the loss.

The Eagles ended the 1935 season with a record of 2–9. Storm was the team's leading passer, having attempted at least one pass in every game and finishing with 15 completions on 44 attempts for 372 yards with three touchdowns, also throwing 10 interceptions. He also ran the ball 84 times for 164 yards and caught three passes for 44 yards. He ranked among the NFL's passing leaders in several categories, including for completions (9th), yards (6th), touchdowns (4th) and total offense (10th). Storm did not return to the Eagles following the 1935 season, concluding his two-year stint having played in 22 games, eight as a starter, while totaling 165 rush attempts for 445 yards and two touchdowns, eight receptions for 78 yards, and 23 pass completions on 74 attempts for 469 yards and three touchdowns to 16 interceptions.

=== Later career ===
In 1936, Storm returned to California and organized the Salinas Iceberg Packers, a new professional team for which he became the head coach. He became the Packers' team captain, owner and general manager. It was the first professional football team in Salinas, California, and Storm's brother, Leo, played for them as well. He signed many of the top players from northern California colleges, as well as some local players. According to The San Francisco Examiner, in order to pay his players, Storm once mortgaged his home. His team was initially supposed to join the new Pacific Coast League, but it folded before any games were played. Salinas thus played as an independent, and player-coach Storm helped them compile a record of 4–4–1, which included two games against NFL teams: a 18–0 loss to the Brooklyn Dodgers and a 47–7 loss to the Green Bay Packers. One of their wins was a 21–17 upset over the Los Angeles Bulldogs, with Storm making several key plays to allow the Packers to score two touchdowns in the last period to win.

Storm's Packers remained independent for the 1937 season. Continuing as a player-coach, he led them to a record of 7–3, with all three of their losses coming to the Los Angeles Bulldogs, a team that went undefeated that season. Although he played, Storm "permitted his weight to offset his playing ability," according to the Los Angeles Times, weighing at 260 pounds (120 kg) during the season. After the Packers season, Storm was the assistant coach to Johnny Blood for the Pacific Coast All-Stars, which played an exhibition against the NFL champion Washington Redskins and lost 14–13. Storm lost 50 pounds (23 kg) for the 1938 season and his Packers joined the California Football League. After a loss to the Bulldogs in their season opener, the Packers defeated the Oakland Cardinals 47–6, but then lost to the Hollywood Stars, and after a win against the Fresno Wine Crushers, lost their last four to finish the season 2–6. With dwindling support, the Packers disbanded after the season.

In September 1939, Storm became manager and coach for the Northern California All-Stars, and challenged the Los Angeles Bulldogs for a game to determine the state championship, although the game was later canceled. The following month, he became head coach for the newly-formed Oakland Oaks, which was the first professional football team to be based in Oakland, California. The Oaks debuted on November 12 against the Bulldogs, but lost, 28–7, with Storm running for his team's only touchdown. In December, Storm served as coach for Kenny Washington's All-Stars, which played against the Bulldogs. Although he declared that his team would defeat the Bulldogs by two touchdowns, they lost, 22–6. In January 1940, he remained coach as they arranged a rematch against the Bulldogs, and Storm finally led his team to a victory, defeating Los Angeles, 15–14.

Near the end of January 1940, Storm was arrested by the Los Angeles police after being accused of grand theft, with the coach of a Fresno team claiming that Storm had taken $400 worth of uniforms for the Kenny Washington All-Stars and never returned them nor paid for them. A Fresno superior court judge dismissed the case the following month, for lack of evidence. Storm was considered a candidate to be a head coach for a Bakersfield-based team in 1940, but did not take the position. In 1941, he became the head coach of the San Diego Bombers in the Pacific Coast Professional Football League (PCFL) and also played fullback for the team. His team compiled a record of 1–5 and placed third in the league. He was involved in a controversy in the Bombers' 26–7 loss to the Hollywood Bears: after a holding penalty was called for on a play were San Diego scored a 71-yard touchdown, Storm and several of his players attacked the referee before being separated by Hollywood players.

Storm initially was only a coach for San Diego in the 1942 season, but mid-season put himself in as the starting fullback. The Los Angeles Evening Citizen News described him as a "colorful coach ... Big Ed tips the beam at 240 pounds ... and is famed for his 'color,' and [he] usually lives up to his name [Storm], for something always happens when Ed is around." The Los Angeles Times called him the "colorful 'wildman' coach." He appeared in two games at fullback and led the Bombers to first place in the league with a PCFL record of 4–1, while they also overall compiled a record of 6–4 including non-league games, which included one win by a score of 88–0 over Stockton Motor Base; they also defeated the Los Angeles Bulldogs 36–7.

Storm announced that he was "permanently" retired from playing following the 1942 season. While remaining coach for the Bombers in 1943, he also coached a team called the Pacific All-Stars, which lost to the March Field Flyers military service team. He described his 1943 San Diego Bombers as "My greatest team," as they compiled a PCFL record of 7–1 and were first in the league. The Bombers opened the season with six consecutive wins before a loss to the Los Angeles Bulldogs, and later after the PCFL season they lost three more times to the Bulldogs in exhibitions. Overall, his team compiled a record of 8–4, with every loss coming to the Bulldogs.

Storm left the Bombers in 1944 to become head coach for the San Diego Gunners in the American Football League. Although he had previously said he was retired from playing, during a game against the Oakland Hornets he put on a uniform and entered the game in the second half. His team was down 7–6, but he intercepted a pass after entering the game and then led a 76-yard drive before kicking a game-winning field goal. In 1945, he coached the San Diego Tigers, and in 1946, he was one of the candidates to coach a Honolulu-based football team.

Storm was among the first professional football players to use the jump pass. He was described in The Californian as "one of the top flight football players developed in the Salinas Valley ... Extremely fast for his size ... Storm was a plunging fullback who was used at safety position by some of his coaches. He was strictly a football man, and if there was anything to do with the fall sport, Ed could be counted on to lend a hand." The mayor of Salinas, E. J. Raffetto, called Storm "one of the best ever developed around here."

== Personal life and death ==
Storm had two children with his wife, Vincie. He served in World War II, having been drafted at the start of 1945. He was ranked a private and was stationed at Fort Lewis in Washington. In 1947, Storm organized a San Francisco 49ers intra-squad game that was played in Salinas, and he served as the game's public address announcer. After his football career, Storm worked for a Salinas lettuce company. He was killed on June 4, 1950, when he was involved in a five-car collision on the Salinas-Watsonville highway. He was aged 42 at his death.
