= Vic Vidoni =

American football end and tackle

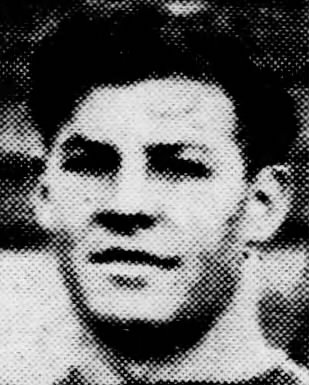
- Vidoni in 1936

No. 19
- Positions: End; Tackle

Personal information
- Born: December 8, 1912; Fostoria, Ohio, U.S.
- Died: October 17, 1994 (aged 81); Ravenna, Ohio, U.S.

Career information
- High school: Bridgeville
- College: Duquesne (1931–1934)

Career history
- Pittsburgh Pirates (1935–1936)

Victor Joseph Vidoni (December 8, 1912 – October 17, 1994) was an American professional football end and tackle. He played for the Pittsburgh Pirates of the National Football League (NFL).

== Life and career ==
Vidoni was born in Fostoria, Ohio. He played high school football at Bridgeville High School in Bridgeville, Pennsylvania. He then enrolled at Duquesne University to play college football for the Duquesne Dukes. He was on the team from 1931 to 1934, and was coached by Elmer Layden.

In 1935, Vidoni joined the Pittsburgh Pirates of the National Football League (NFL). He played in eleven games during the 1935 NFL season, and played in two games during the 1936 NFL season. He was released from the team in 1936. After his football career ended, he worked in a plate glass company.

== Death ==
Vidoni died on October 17, 1994, in Ravenna, Ohio, at the age of 81.
