= William Grinnell =

American football player and coach (1909–1997)

- Grinnell pictured in Cauldron 1949, Northeastern yearbook

Biographical details
- Born: December 29, 1909; Boston, Massachusetts, U.S.
- Died: June 25, 1997 (aged 87); Hyannis, Massachusetts, U.S.

Playing career

Football
- 1932–1934: Tufts
- Position: End

Coaching career (HC unless noted)

Football
- 1935: Wilmington HS (MA)
- 1936: Lexington HS (MA) (assistant)
- 1937–1938: Lexington HS (MA)
- 1939–1943: Brookline HS (MA) (assistant)
- 1946–1947: Northeastern

Basketball
- 1935–1936: Wilmington HS (MA)
- 1939–1941: Tufts (assistant)
- 1942–1944: Brookline HS (MA)
- 1946–1948: Northeastern
- 1948–1957: Brookline HS (MA)

Head coaching record
- Overall: 4–8 (college football); 16–18 (college football)

Accomplishments and honors

Awards
- First-team Little All-American (1934)
- College Football Hall of Fame; Inducted in 1997 (profile)

William Gordon "Johnny" Grinnell (December 29, 1909 – June 26, 1997) was an American football player and coach of football and basketball. He played football at Tufts University from 1932 to 1934. Grinnell served as the head football coach at Northeastern University from 1946 to 1947. He was also the head basketball coach at Northeastern for two seasons, from 1946 to 1948. Grinnell was elected to the College Football Hall of Fame as a coach in 1997.

== Playing career ==
Grinnell was a three-sport star at Medford High School. He worked for two years after graduating and before deciding to resume his education. He was persuaded by his neighbor, Frederick M. Ellis, to attend the Bridgton Academy, where Ellis was a coach. Grinnell was captain of the Bridgton basketball team in 1929.

Grinnell played end for the Tufts football team from 1932 to 1934. In 1934, Grinnell helped lead Tufts to an 8–0 record. That year, Tufts ceded only one touchdown in eight games and cumulatively outscored its opponents by a margin of 91–9. On account of his high caliber of play, Grinnell was named to the first-ever Small College All-America team.

While at Tufts, Grinnell also played basketball, baseball, and track. He was a three-time member of the All-New England basketball team. Grinnell graduated from Tufts in 1935.

== Coaching career ==
Grinnell began his coaching career at Wilmington High School in Wilmington, Massachusetts. He coached football, basketball, and baseball and taught social sciences. WHS had been without a football team for several seasons and Grinnell was tasked with building the program from the ground up. In 1936, he moved to Lexington High School, where he was an assistant football coach and head ice hockey coach. The following year, he was promoted to head football coach.

In 1939, he became an assistant football coach at Brookline High School. That same year, he returned to Tufts as an assistant basketball coach. In 1942, he became the head basketball coach at Brookline High. In 1944, Grinnell was commissioned Lieutenant (junior grade) in the United States Navy Reserve. He was discharged in 1946, but Brookline chose not to return him to his coaching position.

After losing his job in Brookline, Grinnell became the head football and basketball coach at Northeastern. He coached the Northeastern football team from 1946 to 1947, amassing a 4–8 record.

In 1948, Grinnell returned to Brookline High School as an English teacher and basketball coach. One of his players was future Governor of Massachusetts Michael Dukakis. He retired from BHS in 1969 and moved to Centerville, Massachusetts.

== Death and legacy ==
Grinnell died on June 26, 1997, due to congestive heart failure.

In August 1997, Grinnell became the first Tufts alumnus inducted into the College Football Hall of Fame. He was one of the first 13 non-Division I-A players admitted into the Hall of Fame.

On April 21, 2018, Grinnell was a member of the inaugural class inducted into the Tufts University Athletics Hall of Fame.

== Head coaching record ==
=== College football ===
| Year | Team | Overall | Conference | Standing | Bowl/playoffs |
|---|---|---|---|---|---|
Northeastern Huskies (Independent) (1946–1947)
| 1946 | Northeastern | 3–3 | | | |
| 1947 | Northeastern | 1–5 | | | |
| Northeastern: | | 4–8 | | | |
| Total: | | 4–8 | | | |
