= 1934 Little All-America college football team =

The 1934 Little All-America college football team is composed of college football players from small colleges and universities who were selected by the Associated Press as the best players at each position. Quarterback John Mackorell of Davidson was named captain of the 1934 Little All-America team.

== First-team ==
Position	Player	Team
QB	John Mackorell	Davidson
HB	Ike Petersen	Gonzaga
HB	Fritz Hanson	North Dakota Agricultural
FB	John Turely	Ohio Wesleyan
E	William Grinnell	Tufts
E	Tod Goodwin	West Virginia
T	Tony Blazine	Illinois Wesleyan
T	Tubby Garland	Catawba
G	Chris Kjeldsen	Pacific
G	Loren Grannis	Willamette
C	Rudy Prochaska	Tulsa

== Second-team ==
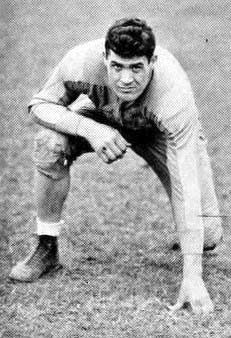
Joe Sydahar

Position	Player	Team
QB	Ralph Semerad	Union (NY)
HB	Cocky Sexton	Fort Hays Teachers
HB	John Arrambide	Whittier
FB	Walter Froelich	Tufts
E	Hermit Davis	Birmingham–Southern
E	Spud Taylor	Davis & Elkins
T	Luke Kellam	Trinity (CT)
T	Joe Stydahar	West Virginia
G	Tom Brown	Western State (CO)
G	Bill Mackey	Emory & Henry
C	Jim Martell	Bluefield

== See also ==
- 1934 College Football All-America Team
