= Al Arndt =

American football player (1911–1969)

Profile
- Position: OG/HB

Personal information
- Born: July 15, 1911; Comfrey, Minnesota
- Died: June 6, 1969 (aged 57)

Career information
- College: South Dakota State

Career history
- Pittsburgh Steelers (1935)

Career statistics
- Games: 7
- Games Started: 2
- Rushing Att. / Yds.: 1 / 21
- Stats at Pro Football Reference

Alfred "Al" Herman Arndt (born July 15, 1911 – June 6, 1969) was a professional American football guard and halfback in the National Football League.

He played collage football and basketball for South Dakota State, and in 1935 played for the Pittsburgh Steelers. In his later years he ran a sporting goods store in Brookings, dying June 6, 1969.
