= John Turley =

American football player (1912–1977)

- Turley, circa 1934

No. 24
- Positions: Blocking back, safety

Personal information
- Born: November 20, 1912; Delaware, Ohio, U.S.
- Died: July 21, 1977 (aged 64); Dayton, Ohio, U.S.
- Listed height: 5 ft 10 in (1.78 m)
- Listed weight: 183 lb (83 kg)

Career information
- High school: Delaware
- College: Ohio Wesleyan

Career history
- Chicago Bears (1935)*; Pittsburgh Pirates (1935–1936)
- * Offseason or practice squad member only
- Stats at Pro Football Reference

John Oscar Turley (November 20, 1912 – July 21, 1977) was an American professional football player for the Pittsburgh Pirates of the National Football League (NFL). He played college football for the Ohio Wesleyan Battling Bishops.

== Early life ==
John Oscar Turley was born on November 20, 1912, in Delaware, Ohio. He was a letterman in football, basketball, and baseball at Delaware High School. He graduated in 1931.

== College career ==
Turley enrolled at Ohio Wesleyan University to play college football for the Battling Bishops. He played quarterback on the varsity team from 1932 to 1934. A November 1934 article in The Cincinnati Enquirer claimed that Turley broke the national field goal record and was one of the top scorers in the country that season. He was adept at kicking, rushing, and passing. Turley also played college baseball and college basketball for the Battling Bishops. He graduated from Ohio Wesleyan in June 1935.

== Professional career ==
On June 8, 1935, Turley signed with the Chicago Bears of the National Football League (NFL). By September 11, 1935, he had joined the Pittsburgh Pirates for the 1935 season. He played in ten games, starting nine, for the Pirates in 1935 as a blocking back on offense and a safety on defense, completing 12 of 27 passes (44.4%) for 144 yards, one touchdown, and six interceptions. Turley started the first four games of the 1936 season and did not record any statistics before being released on October 7, 1936.

== Personal life ==
On December 19, 1935, Turley married Opal E. Hart. He retired from Frigidaire in 1970 due to a heart ailment. He died on July 21, 1977, in Dayton, Ohio.
