= Tony Blazine =

American football player and coach (1912–1963)

No. 23, 69
- Position: Offensive tackle

Personal information
- Born: January 2, 1912; Canton, Illinois
- Died: July 3, 1963 (aged 51); Richland, Washington
- Listed height: 6 ft 0 in (1.83 m)
- Listed weight: 232 lb (105 kg)

Career information
- High school: Johnson City HS (Johnson City, IL)
- College: Illinois Wesleyan (1931–1934)

Career history
- Chicago Cardinals (1935–1940); New York Giants (1941)

Awards and highlights
- First-team Little All-American (1934)

Career statistics
- Games played: 73
- Games started: 46
- Receptions: 1
- Receiving yards: 2
- Stats at Pro Football Reference
- College Football Hall of Fame

Anthony A. Blazine, Jr. (January 2, 1912 – July 3, 1963) was an American football player and coach. He played college football at Illinois Wesleyan University from 1931 to 1934 and professional football in the National Football League for the Chicago Cardinals and New York Giants from 1935 to 1941. He played at the tackle position. He later served as an assistant football coach at the University of Illinois (1944–1946), University of Nebraska (1947–1948), and Washington State College (1949). He was posthumously inducted into the College Football Hall of Fame in 2002.

== Early life ==
Blazine was born in 1912 at Canton, Illinois, and attended high school in Johnson City, Illinois.

== Football player ==
He enrolled at Illinois Wesleyan University where he played college football at the tackle position from 1931 to 1934. In December 1934, he was named to the little All-America team, a team of top players selected with the aid of the Associated Press from the rosters of small college football teams. Blazine was also invited to play in the 1935 Chicago College All-Star Game and played 57 minutes in the game.

After graduating from Illinois Wesleyan, Blazine played professional football in the National Football League. He spent six seasons and appeared in 63 games at the tackle position for the Chicago Cardinals from 1935 to 1940. He was selected as a second-team All-NFL player in 1935 and appeared in the 1939 Pro Bowl. He concluded his professional football career appearing in 10 games for the New York Giants in 1941.

== Coaching career ==
After retiring as a player, Blazine worked for several years as a football coach. By 1944, he was engaged as the line coach for the Illinois Fighting Illini football team under head coach Ray Eliot. In February 1947, Blazine left Illinois and was hired as the line coach for the Nebraska Cornhuskers football team. In 1949, he was hired as an assistant professor of physical education at Washington State College and as an assistant coach for the Washington State Cougars football team. Blazine was an assistant coach at Washington State for only one season.

== Later life ==
Blazine later became a partner in a sporting good store in Richland, Washington. He was married, and he and his wife, Christine, had three children—Barbara, Paul and Mary Frances. Blazine died at his home in Richland in 1963 at age 51. He was posthumously inducted into the College Football Hall of Fame in 2002.
