= 1935 Brooklyn Dodgers (NFL) season =

National Football League team season

1935 Brooklyn Dodgers season
- Owner: Dan Topping
- Head coach: Paul Schissler
- Home stadium: Ebbets Field

Results
- Record: 5–6–1
- Division place: 2nd NFL Eastern
- Playoffs: Did not qualify

The 1935 Brooklyn Dodgers season was their sixth in the National Football League. The team improved on their previous season's output of 4–7, winning five games. They failed to qualify for the playoffs for the fourth consecutive season.

== Schedule ==
Game	Date	Opponent	Result	Record	Venue	Attendance	Recap	Sources
1	September 29	**Boston Redskins**	**L** 3–7	0–1	Fenway Park	18,000	Recap	
2	October 6	Detroit Lions	**W** 12–10	1–1	Ebbets Field	10,000	Recap	
3	October 13	at **New York Giants**	**L** 7–10	1–2	Polo Grounds	30,000	Recap	
4	October 20	at Chicago Bears	**L** 14–24	1–3	Wrigley Field	18,000	Recap	
5	October 27	**Philadelphia Eagles**	**W** 17–6	2–3	Ebbets Field	20,000	Recap	
6	November 3	at **Pittsburgh Pirates**	**W** 13–7	3–3	Forbes Field	13,390	Recap	
7	November 5	at **Philadelphia Eagles**	**W** 3–0	4–3	Baker Bowl	10,000	Recap	
8	November 10	**Pittsburgh Pirates**	**L** 7–16	4–4	Ebbets Field	18,000	Recap	
9	November 19	Chicago Cardinals	**W** 14–12	5–4	Ebbets Field	18,000	Recap	
—	Bye							
10	November 28	**New York Giants**	**L** 0–21	5–5	Ebbets Field	25,000	Recap	
11	December 1	at Detroit Lions	**L** 0–28	5–6	Dinan Field	12,000	Recap	
12	December 8	**Boston Redskins**	**T** 0–0	5–6–1	Ebbets Field	5,000	Recap	
Note: Intra-division opponents are in **bold** text.

== Standings ==
NFL Eastern Division
	W	L	T	PCT	DIV	PF	PA	STK
New York Giants	9	3	0	.750	8–0	180	96	W5
Brooklyn Dodgers	5	6	1	.455	3–4–1	90	141	T1
Pittsburgh Pirates	4	8	0	.333	3–5	100	209	L3
Boston Redskins	2	8	1	.200	2–4–1	65	123	T1
Philadelphia Eagles	2	9	0	.182	2–5	60	179	L5

Note: Tie games were not officially counted in the standings until 1972.
