= Harry Benson (American football) =

American football player (1909–1943)

Harry Hartley Benson (October 7, 1909 – May 14, 1943) was a professional American football guard in the National Football League. He played in the 1935 season for the Philadelphia Eagles. The following year, he played for the Los Angeles Bulldogs.

Benson was born in 1909 in Baltimore. He attended Baltimore City College, Western Maryland College, and the University of Baltimore.

He enlisted in the United States Army on January 27, 1941. Private First Class Benson was killed in action on May 14, 1943, during the Aleutian Islands campaign. His remains were returned from Alaska in September 1948 aboard the transport ship Honda Knot.
