= Stu Clancy =

American football player (1906–1965)

- Clancy in 1934

No. 44, 4
- Positions: Quarterback, halfback, linebacker

Personal information
- Born: June 6, 1906; Branford, Connecticut, U.S.
- Died: September 24, 1965 (aged 59); Branford, Connecticut, U.S.
- Listed height: 5 ft 10 in (1.78 m)
- Listed weight: 189 lb (86 kg)

Career information
- High school: Branford
- College: Holy Cross

Career history
- Newark Tornadoes (1930); Staten Island Stapletons (1931–1932); New York Giants (1932–1935)

Awards and highlights
- NFL champion (1934)

Career statistics
- Games played: 50
- Starts: 11
- Rushing attempts: 128
- Yards rushing: 409
- Receptions: 6
- Yards receiving: 72
- Touchdowns: 4 (Statistics incomplete)
- Stats at Pro Football Reference

Stuart Joseph Clancy (June 6, 1906 – September 24, 1965) was an American professional football player who was a quarterback (i.e. single-wing blocking back) and halfback in the National Football League (NFL) from 1930 to 1935. He played college football for the Holy Cross Crusaders.

== Biography ==
Stu Clancy was born June 6, 1906, in Branford, Connecticut. He attended Branford High School, where he was a member of the football team for four years, running from 1921 to 1924. He then moved to St. John's Prep, where he played the 1925 and 1926 seasons.

Clancy played football for the College of the Holy Cross in Worcester, Massachusetts — halfback on the offense and linebacker on the defensive side of the ball. He earned recognition in 1928 when in a game against Harvard College Clancy made 15 consecutive tackles as a linebacker. He graduated from Holy Cross in 1930 with a Bachelor of Arts degree.

Clancy broke into the NFL in 1930 with the Newark Tornadoes before moving to the Staten Island Stapletons in 1931. After 9 games with the Stapletons in 1932, Clancy was traded to the New York Football Giants, with whom he finished the season. He would remain with the Giants through 1935, winning a world championship in 1934.

Clancy died in Branford on September 24, 1965. He was 59 years old at the time of his death.
