= Glenn Campbell (American football) =

American football player (1904–1973)

Profile
- Position: End

Personal information
- Born: April 20, 1904; Thayer, Kansas, U.S.
- Died: September 16, 1973 (aged 69); Topeka, Kansas, U.S.
- Listed height: 5 ft 11 in (1.80 m)
- Listed weight: 199 lb (90 kg)

Career information
- College: Emporia State

Career history
- New York Giants (1929–1933); Philadelphia Eagles (1935); Pittsburgh Pirates (1935)

Career statistics
- Games played: 70
- Starts: 34
- Receptions: 14
- Receiving yards: 175
- Touchdowns: 6
- Stats at Pro Football Reference

Glenn Rex "Slim" Campbell (April 20, 1904 – September 16, 1973) was an American football end who played for six seasons for three teams, the New York Giants, Philadelphia Eagles and the Pittsburgh Steelers. He played college football at the Emporia State University for the Emporia State Hornets football team.
