= Tony Sarausky =

American football player (1913–1990)

No. 11, 69
- Position: Quarterback

Personal information
- Born: April 7, 1913; Cambridge, Massachusetts, U.S.
- Died: June 21, 1990 (aged 77); Littleton, New Hampshire, U.S.

Career information
- College: Fordham

Career history
- New York Giants (1935–1937); Brooklyn Dodgers (1938)

Career statistics
- TD–INT: 2-3
- Yards: 149
- QB rating: 28.8

Anthony Olgrid Sarausky (April 7, 1913 – June 21, 1990) was an American football quarterback in the National Football League (NFL). He played for the New York Giants and Brooklyn Dodgers. He played college football for the Fordham Rams. In his later years, he lived in Littleton, New Hampshire, teaching and coaching football at the town's high school and also working as an auxiliary fireman and a sportscaster for the local radio station.
