= Tod Goodwin =

American football player (1911–1997)

- Goodwin in 1936

No. 14
- Position: End

Personal information
- Born: December 5, 1911; Wheeling, West Virginia, U.S.
- Died: January 7, 1997 (aged 85)
- Listed height: 6 ft 0 in (1.83 m)
- Listed weight: 184 lb (83 kg)

Career information
- High school: Bellaire (Bellaire, Ohio)
- College: West Virginia

Career history
- New York Giants (1935–1936)

Awards and highlights
- Second-team All-Pro (1935); NFL receptions leader (1935); First-team Little All-American (1934)

Career statistics
- Games played: 20
- Starts: 14
- Receptions: 33
- Receiving yards: 511
- Receiving touchdowns: 6
- Stats at Pro Football Reference

Charles R. "Tod" Goodwin (December 5, 1911 – January 7, 1997) was an American athlete who played football collegiately at West Virginia University. Playing the position of end, Goodwin spent the 1935 and 1936 season playing professional football for the New York Football Giants.

Goodwin was the NFL leader in receptions with 26 in 1935, which earned him second-team honors on the 1935 All-Pro Team. As of 2026, he is the only New York Giant who has led the NFL in pass receptions.

== Biography ==
=== Early life ===
Charles R. Goodwin, known to family and friends as "Tod," was born December 5, 1911, in Wheeling, West Virginia. He grew up in Bellaire, Ohio, attending Bellaire High School in that city. He had over 309 receiving yards and scored 66 points in his high school career.

=== College career ===
Goodwin played football collegiately at West Virginia University (WVU), where the end gained a reputation both for superlative pass-catching skills and for an exuberant confidence that offended the sensibilities of some traditionalists. As a sophomore at WVU, Goodwin's arrogant patter inspired head coach Earle "Greasy" Neale to force him to wear a sign for a week reading "I Am Cocky," in an attempt to shame Goodwin to humility. At the end of the week of what was intended as a public humiliation, Goodwin showed up before the team with a new sign that he had made himself, reading simply "I Am Still Cocky."

While at West Virginia, Goodwin was a three-sport athlete, also starring in basketball and track and field. He was also a member of Sigma Phi Epsilon WVU Beta Chapter.

=== Professional career ===
Goodwin signed to play with the New York Football Giants of the National Football League in 1935, the last year before institution of the NFL draft. The jocular and gregarious Goodwin was popular among his teammates, earning the nicknames "Dingbat," "Baby Face," and "Mouth" from his Giants comrades.

His brashness aside, Goodwin produced on the field, leading the NFL in receiving in the run-heavy year of 1935 with 26 receptions for 432 yards and 4 touchdowns. Goodwin's reception total was a new league record, albeit short-lived, as in 1936 it was surpassed by future Hall of Famer Don Hutson of the Green Bay Packers. The effort was good enough for Goodwin to be named as a second-team member of the 1935 All-Pro Team.

== See also ==
- 1935 New York Giants season
- 1936 New York Giants season
