= Red Kirkman =

American football player (1905–1973)

Profile
- Position: Back

Personal information
- Born: October 17, 1905; Woodland, West Virginia, U.S.
- Died: November 30, 1973 (aged 68); Columbus, Ohio, U.S.
- Listed height: 6 ft 1 in (1.85 m)
- Listed weight: 195 lb (88 kg)

Career information
- College: Western Reserve; Washington & Jefferson College

Career history
- Philadelphia Eagles (1933–1935)
- Stats at Pro Football Reference

Roger Randolph "Red" Kirkman (October 17, 1905 – November 30, 1973) was an American professional football player for the Philadelphia Eagles of the National Football League.

Kirkman attended Central High School in Akron, Ohio. He began his career at Western Reserve, where he played running back. He left the school prior to the 1925 season and enrolled at Washington & Jefferson College in time for the 1926 season. He was the starting quarterback for the undefeated 1927 Washington & Jefferson Presidents football team, sharing a backfield with Bill Amos, Bob Heisel, and Cleve Cook. He also played forward for the Washington & Jefferson Presidents men's basketball team and was team captain during the 1927–28 season.

After graduating from W&J, Kirkman spent two years as the athletic director at Scottdale High School in Scottdale, Pennsylvania. In 1930, he became the freshman football coach and head men's basketball coach at John Carroll University.

From 1933 to 1935, Kirkman was a reserve back for the Philadelphia Eagles. He started sixteen games over those three seasons and completed 30 of 97 passes for 393 yards, 4 touchdowns, and 15 interceptions. He also rushed for 55 yards and caught 12 passes for 198 and two touchdowns. He also played for the Reading Keys in 1935.
