= George Musso =

American football player (1910–2000)

No. 16, 15
- Positions: Guard, offensive tackle

Personal information
- Born: April 8, 1910; Collinsville, Illinois, U.S.
- Died: September 5, 2000 (aged 90); Edwardsville, Illinois, U.S.
- Listed height: 6 ft 2 in (1.88 m)
- Listed weight: 262 lb (119 kg)

Career information
- High school: Collinsville
- College: Millikin (1929–1932)

Career history
- Chicago Bears (1933–1944)

Awards and highlights
- 4× NFL champion (1933, 1940-1941, 1943); 2× First-team All-Pro (1935, 1937); 3× NFL All-Star (1939–1941); NFL 75th Anniversary All-Time Team; 100 greatest Bears of All-Time

Career statistics
- Games played: 128
- Games started: 84
- Stats at Pro Football Reference
- Pro Football Hall of Fame

George Francis Musso (April 8, 1910 – September 5, 2000) was an American professional football guard and offensive tackle who spent his entire 12-year career for the Chicago Bears of the National Football League (NFL). He was inducted into the Pro Football Hall of Fame in 1982.

== Early life ==
Musso was the son of a coal miner who starred in high school sports in Collinsville, Illinois, and was therefore offered an athletic grant to attend James Millikin University. His father, who initially planned to pull him out of school after he completed his "primary" education, grudgingly allowed George to attend college.

== College career ==
Musso attended Millikin University and was a standout in football, basketball, baseball, and track. Millikin was in the "Little 19" conference that included such teams as Eureka, Lombard, and Augustana. In 1929, Musso played against future President Ronald Reagan, who played guard for Eureka College and weighed about 175 pounds; Eureka lost to Musso and Millikin 45–6. Musso was already larger than most linemen of his era, playing college ball at 6' 2", 255 pounds. In 1933, Musso played in the East-West All-Star game, held in Chicago; it was there he first got the attention of George Halas.

== Professional career ==
Halas, who had doubts the small school Musso could make it in the NFL, offered Musso a $90 a game contract (this was half rate for regular players at that time). Musso agreed and, although he struggled at first, became the centerpiece of the Bears line for 12 years. One reason the Bears of that era were called "Monsters of the Midway" was their imposing size—Musso, who played professionally at 270 pounds, was one of the largest Bears and one of the largest players in the league. His teammates called him "Moose." He played offensive tackle until 1937 when he moved to guard. He was the first to win All-NFL at two positions; tackle (1935), and guard (1937). He played middle guard or nose tackle on defense his entire career.

Musso captained the Chicago Bears for nine seasons, playing on the line with other NFL notables as Link Lyman, Joe Kopcha, Walt Kiesling, Bulldog Turner, Joe Stydahar, and Danny Fortmann. He played in seven NFL championship games, with the Bears winning four (1933, 1940, 1941, and 1943). He was inducted to the Pro Football Hall of Fame in 1982. Of note, in 1935 as an NFL lineman, Musso played against Gerald Ford of Michigan in the 1935 College All-Star game.

== After the NFL ==
Musso retired to Edwardsville, Illinois, and began a restaurant business. He served as the Madison County, Illinois, sheriff and treasurer from the 1950s through the 1970s. He died in his home in Edwardsville in 2000.
