= Heinie Weisenbaugh =

American football player (1914–1965)

Profile
- Position: halfback

Personal information
- Born: March 12, 1914; Tarentum, Pennsylvania, U.S.
- Died: September 20, 1965 (aged 51); Tarentum, Pennsylvania, U.S.

Career information
- High school: Tatentum (PA); The Kiski School
- College: Pittsburgh

Career history
- Pittsburgh Pirates (1935); Boston Redskins (1935–1936)

Career statistics
- Games played: 18
- Rushing yards: 59
- Receiving yards: 110
- Touchdowns: 2
- Stats at Pro Football Reference

Henry A. "Heinie" Weisenbaugh (March 12, 1914 – September 20, 1965) was an American professional football player who was a halfback in the National Football League (NFL) for the Pittsburgh Pirates and Boston Redskins. He played college football at the University of Pittsburgh.

== Early life ==
Weisenbaugh was born in Tarentum, Pennsylvania and attended Tarentum High School, where he played high school football. He then attended The Kiski School in Saltsburg, Pennsylvania.

== Football career ==
After Prep School, Weisenbaugh attended and played college football at the University of Pittsburgh as a fullback. In 1932, the Pittsburgh Panthers went undefeated in the regular season, then lost to the USC Trojans in the 1933 Rose Bowl. He graduated from Pittsburgh in 1935 and then joined the Pittsburgh Pirates of the National Football League (NFL). He then played for the Boston Redskins before retiring from playing football. Weisenbaugh then served as a field official for the NFL for several years.

== Dentistry ==
Weisenbaugh graduated from the University of Pittsburgh School of Dental Medicine in 1938 and established his practice in Tarentum.

== Military service ==
During World War II, Weisenbaugh served as a captain and dental officer in the 455th Anti-Aircraft Artillery Battalion in Europe. He later departed the unit and eventually became a major in the Army Medical Corps.
