= Dale Burnett =

American football player (1908–1997)

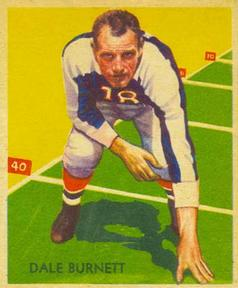

No. 18
- Positions: Halfback, fullback

Personal information
- Born: January 23, 1908; Larned, Kansas, U.S.
- Died: April 17, 1997 (aged 89); Emporia, Kansas, U.S.
- Listed height: 6 ft 1 in (1.85 m)
- Listed weight: 187 lb (85 kg)

Career information
- High school: Dodge City (KS)
- College: Kansas State Teachers College

Career history
- New York Giants (1930–1939); Paterson Panthers (1940–1942)

Awards and highlights
- 2× NFL champion (1934, 1938); NFL All-Star Game (1938); NFL receiving touchdowns co-leader (1933)

Career statistics
- Games played: 115
- Starts: 64
- Receptions: 92
- Receiving yards: 1,310
- Carries: 79
- Rushing yards: 167
- Touchdowns: 25; Rushing and receiving stats exclude first two seasons.
- Stats at Pro Football Reference

Dale M. Burnett (January 23, 1908 – April 17, 1997) was an American professional football back for the New York Giants of the National Football League (NFL). He attended Dodge City High School in Dodge City, Kansas.

Burnett retired in 1939 as the all-time top scorer in Giants history and holder of the franchise record for touchdowns scored, with 25.

== Early life ==
Dale Burnett was born January 23, 1908, in Larned, Kansas, a town of fewer than 3,000 people located in the central part of the state. He was a student at Dodge City High School, where he played football and basketball. As a starting guard on the Dodge City team he helped win back-to-back championships in the Santa Fe League in 1924-25 and 1925–26.

He enrolled at Kansas State Teachers College in Emporia, Kansas in the fall of 1926 and was awarded athletic letters in football, basketball, and track and field competing for the freshman team.

He was elevated to the varsity football team in 1927. This squad would emerge as co-champions of the Kansas Conference with a record of 7–0–1, including five shutouts — not counting a scoreless tied with local rival College of Emporia to finish the year.

Team photo of the 1927 Kansas State Teachers College Hornets team. Dale Burnett is marked #23, near the center. His friend Slim Campbell, who helped him land a pro football job, is marked #21.

In 1928, with a new coach Frank G. Welch leading the team, Teachers College finished second in the new Central Conference of Kansas with a record of 4–1–1. The final game of the season, an 18–0 shutout loss to College of Emporia, had cemented the conference championship for the crosstown rivals. Despite the season's disappointing finish, Burnett, starting fullback on the 1928 squad, was beginning to emerge as a star of the Teachers College team.

Burnett, moving to halfback position, was elected a co-captain of the Kansas State Teachers College team for his 1929 senior season. This time the team "began like champions, and finished like them," racking up a conference record of 5–1 (6–2 overall) and winning the Central Conference of Kansas title. Burnett was for the third straight year accorded All-Conference honors in the aftermath of the successful season.

While at Teachers College, Burnett also competed at basketball — captaining the team as a senior and being named to the All-Conference first team during his final two seasons. He also was a star of the Hornets' track and field team, gaining recognition as a hurdler and broad jumper. In all Burnett won a total of 12 athletic letters during his college career — regarded as a particularly noteworthy achievement.

== Professional career ==
During the early years of the National Football League (NFL), talent scouting was a highly inexact science, with extremely limited staff sizes and travel budgets. Dale Burnett's door-opening connection with the New York Football Giants of the NFL was a former teammate, Glenn "Slim" Campbell. Campbell, who was a rookie end for Giants in 1929, convinced team general manager and coach Leroy Andrews that the athletic Burnett was capable of playing on the professional circuit. The team was intrigued enough to bring him to New York City for a look.

Weighing in at 185 pounds, Burnett was regarded as ineffective plunging the line from the backfield, but was rated as a superior punter and defensive back, with capable passing skills on the offensive side of the ball. Barnett signed a contract with the Giants in the middle of March 1930 (there being no player draft in this era), and was scheduled to report for training camp September 1.

The Giants in this era had a roster disproportionately weighted towards players like Burnett and Campbell from small colleges, following the theory that such athletes were toughened up rigor of needing to play a full 60 minute game, whereas players from large schools typically played only one quarter per half before being removed for substitutes. The pair did charity work on behalf of the Giants organizations, participating as part of a six-man contingent to Sing Sing state penitentiary in November 1931 to serve as a coaches on intramural football teams being organized among inmates.

Although touchdowns were tracked — Burnett scored 6 and 3 in his first two seasons, respectively — it was not until 1932 that the NFL began compiling and publishing playing statistics, so specifics of Burnett's 1930 and 1931 performance are lost. During his subsequent eight years in the league he seems to have been used primarily as a blocker and pass receiver out of the backfield, carrying the ball just 79 times in 87 games played. His most productive year as a receiver came in 1936, when he snared 16 balls for 246 yards and 3 touchdowns in 12 games played.

Burnett was twice an NFL Champion, with the Giants winning the league's "Championship Play-off" in 1934 and 1936. In the 1934 Championship, the legendary "sneakers game" won by the Giants 30–13 over the Chicago Bears, Burnett started at left halfback and was part of the team's ineffectual ground game on a frozen, icy Polo Grounds field. In the 1938 Championship Game, also played in New York, Burnett came off the bench in a reserve role, behind starting halfbacks Hank Soar and Ward Cuff.

At the time of his departure at the end of the 1939 season, Burnett stood as the all-time leading scorer in Giants history, with 166 total points scored. His 25 touchdowns also stood at that time as a franchise best.

From 1940 to 1942, he was a player-coach for the Paterson Panthers of the American Association. He scored nine touchdowns (six receiving, two passing, and one rushing) in 23 games and had a coaching record of 16–8–3.

== Personal life ==
During his NFL career, Burnett lived in the off-season in Earle, Arkansas, where he operated a general store and farmed cotton. He and his wife Claralee raised three children — two boys and a girl.

== Life after football ==
In 1940, Burnett became the head men's basketball coach at Williams College. He was an officer with the United States Navy's physical training division during World War II. He coached football teams in Hawaii and saw service in the air corps. He returned to Williams in 1946 as varsity basketball, assistant football, and freshman baseball coach. In 1949, he was named backfield coach at Arkansas State University. He later made a career as an office manager for the Kansas State Employment Service.

Dale Burnett died April 17, 1997, in Emporia, Kansas. He was 89 years old at the time of his death.
