= Ingomar, Ohio =

Unincorporated community in Ohio, U.S.

Coordinates: 39°42′43″N 84°30′00″W

Ingomar is an unincorporated community in Preble County, in the U.S. state of Ohio.

== History ==
Ingomar had its start around 1886 when the railroad was extended to that point. A post office was established at Ingomar in 1889, and remained in operation until 1958.
