= Bill Morgan (American football) =

American football player (1910–1985)

No. 27
- Position: Offensive lineman

Personal information
- Born: May 8, 1910; Portland, Oregon, U.S.
- Died: July 10, 1985 (aged 75); Canby, Oregon, U.S.
- Listed height: 6 ft 2 in (1.88 m)
- Listed weight: 232 lb (105 kg)

Career information
- High school: Medford (OR)
- College: Oregon

Career history
- New York Giants (1933–1936)

Awards and highlights
- NFL champion (1934); First-team All-PCC (1931); Second-team All-PCC (1932)

Career statistics
- Games played: 48
- Starts: 29
- Stats at Pro Football Reference

Elmer William Morgan (May 8, 1910 – July 10, 1985) was an American professional football player who was an offensive lineman for four seasons for the New York Giants.

== Biography ==
Born in Portland, Oregon, Morgan attended high school at Medford High School in Medford, Oregon and played college football for the University of Oregon.
