= Henry Reese =

American football player (1909–1975)

Hank Reese

Profile
- Positions: Center, guard

Personal information
- Born: October 24, 1909; Scranton, Pennsylvania, U.S.
- Died: August 3, 1975 (aged 65); Ocean City, New Jersey, U.S.
- Listed height: 5 ft 11 in (1.80 m)
- Listed weight: 214 lb (97 kg)

Career information
- College: Temple

Career history
- New York Giants (1933–1934); Philadelphia Eagles (1935–1939)

Awards and highlights
- NFL champion (1934)
- Stats at Pro Football Reference

Henry L. Reese (October 24, 1909 – August 3, 1975) was an American professional football player. He played as a center and guard in the National Football League (NFL) for the New York Giants and Philadelphia Eagles. He played college football at Temple University.
