= Joe Kopcha =

American football player (1905–1986)

No. 22, 29, 18
- Position: Guard

Personal information
- Born: December 23, 1905; Whiting, Indiana, U.S.
- Died: July 29, 1986 (aged 80); Hobart, Indiana, U.S.
- Listed height: 6 ft 0 in (1.83 m)
- Listed weight: 221 lb (100 kg)

Career information
- High school: Whiting (IN)
- College: Chattanooga

Career history
- Chicago Bears (1929–1935); Detroit Lions (1936)

Awards and highlights
- 2× NFL champion (1932, 1933); 3× First-team All-Pro (1933–1935); Second-team All-Pro (1932); 100 greatest Bears of All-Time

Career statistics
- Games played: 72
- Games started: 56
- Receiving yards: 24
- Stats at Pro Football Reference

Joseph Edwards Kopcha (December 23, 1905 – July 29, 1986) was an American professional football player who was a guard for eight seasons in the National Football League (NFL), primarily with the Chicago Bears.

Kopcha attended the University of Tennessee at Chattanooga, where he studied to become an obstetrician, and played professional football in order to fund his university studies. Kopcha played for the Detroit Lions when he obtained an internship at Harper Hospital, after previously studying at the Rush Medical College when playing for the Bears. Kopcha used his knowledge to redesign the shoulder pads worn by players, with his basic designs still in use today.

== Personal life ==
Kopcha was of Polish descent.
