= Bill Karr =

American football player (1911–1979)

No. 22
- Position: End

Personal information
- Born: March 29, 1911; Ripley, West Virginia, U.S.
- Died: October 29, 1979 (aged 68); Clendenin, West Virginia, U.S.
- Listed height: 6 ft 1 in (1.85 m)
- Listed weight: 190 lb (86 kg)

Career information
- High school: Ripley (WV)
- College: West Virginia
- NFL draft: : 3rd round, 76th overall pick

Career history
- Chicago Bears (1933–1938)

Awards and highlights
- First-team All-Pro (1935); 2× NFL receiving touchdowns leader (1933, 1935)

Career statistics
- Receptions: 48
- Receiving yards: 1,032
- Yards per Reception: 21.5
- Receiving touchdowns: 18
- Stats at Pro Football Reference

William Morrison Karr Jr. (November 29, 1911 – October 29, 1979) was an American football end who played six seasons in the National Football League (NFL) for the Chicago Bears from 1933 to 1938. He twice led the NFL in receiving touchdowns and was selected to the 1935 All-Pro Team.

== Early life ==
Karr was born in 1911 in Ripley, West Virginia. He attended West Virginia University from 1929 to 1933, competing in boxing, baseball, football, track, and basketball. He played at the end position for Greasy Neale's 1931 and 1932 West Virginia football teams.

== Professional football ==
Karr joined the Chicago Bears in 1933. As a rookie, he appeared in all 13 games, playing at the end position. He led the NFL in 1933 with three touchdown receptions and helped lead the Bears to their first NFL championship. In the 1933 NFL Championship Game, Karr scored two touchdowns, one on a pass from Bronko Nagurski and then taking a lateral for 31 yards and the winning touchdown with three minutes remaining.

Karr again led the NFL in receiving touchdowns with six in 1935. He was selected as a first-team player on the 1935 All-Pro Team and as a second-team player on the 1934 and 1937 teams.

Playing in six NFL seasons, Karr appeared in 63 games and totaled 48 receptions, 1,032 receiving yards, 18 receiving touchdowns, and 120 points scored. In 1941, George Halas selected Karr as the right end on his All-Time Bears team.

== Later life ==
In 1939, Karr joined the West Virginia State Police.

Karr died in 1978, in Clendenin, West Virginia.
