= Armand Niccolai =

American football player (1911–1988)

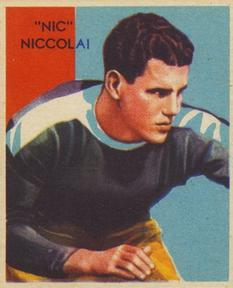

Profile
- Position: Guard

Personal information
- Born: November 8, 1911; Vesta, Pennsylvania
- Died: December 2, 1988 (Age 77)

Career information
- College: Duquesne

Career history
- Pittsburgh Pirates/Steelers (1934–1942)

Armand Niccolai (November 8, 1911 – December 2, 1988) was a guard who played nine seasons in the National Football League. Niccolai attended Duquesne University.

Armand Niccolai played nine seasons for the Pittsburgh Pirates/Steelers after attending nearby Duquesne University. He led the team in scoring in four years, including posting a personal-best 28 points in both 1935 and 1936. He booted a Steelers'-best seven field goals in 1936, which that mark would not be broken for the next 14 years.

Niccolai lived in Monessen, Pennsylvania. He died in 1988 at Mercy Hospital inn Pittsburgh.
