= Eggs Manske =

American football player and coach (1912–2002)

Edgar Manske
- Manske in his playing days

No. 7
- Position: End

Personal information
- Born: July 4, 1912; Nekoosa, Wisconsin, U.S.
- Died: January 27, 2002 (aged 89); Los Angeles, California, U.S.

Career information
- High school: Nekoosa
- College: Northwestern

Career history
- Philadelphia Eagles (1935–1936); Chicago Bears (1937, 1938–1940); Pittsburgh Pirates (1938)

Awards and highlights
- NFL champion (1940); 1935 2nd team All-Pro as a rookie (GB Press-Gazette); Led NFL in TD fumble returns (1938) and TD int returns (1937); First-team All-American (1933); Second-team All-Big Ten (1933)

Career statistics
- Games played: 65
- Starts: 32
- Yards per reception, career: 21.0
- Defensive touchdowns, career: 2
- Stats at Pro Football Reference
- College Football Hall of Fame

Edgar John "Eggs" Manske (July 4, 1912 – January 27, 2002) was an American professional football player who was an end for six seasons in the National Football League (NFL). Manske was the last college football player to play without a helmet. Manske played in two NFL championship games with the Chicago Bears, including the historic 1940 NFL Championship Game, a 73–0 victory over the Washington Redskins.

== Early life and college career ==
Manske was born in 1912 in Nekoosa, Wisconsin. He graduated from Alexander High School (renamed Nekoosa High School).

A member of the College Football Hall of Fame, Manske excelled in college at both football and basketball. A three-year letterman at Northwestern, he began his football career as a walk-on, became a starter during his sophomore season after excelling as a substitute end in a 1930 game against Notre Dame, and ended his career as team Most Valuable Player in 1933. Manske was elected to the All-Big Ten Conference and United Press International All-America teams in 1933. He was also named to the All-Big Ten team in basketball in 1933. In his senior year, Manske played all sixty minutes against Ohio State, Notre Dame, Minnesota, and Illinois, and all but two minutes against Michigan.

== NFL career ==
As part of the first College All-Star team to line up against the current NFL champions, Manske caught the eye of Chicago Bears coach George Halas during the surprising 1934 All-Star game; Manske performed well against starting Bears lineman George Musso. Halas eventually obtained Manske's services by trade with Philadelphia in 1937.

Manske image from matchbook cover, Philadelphia 1937

During his professional football career, Manske played at the end position. Manske led the Philadelphia Eagles in scoring during the 1935 season; his picture appeared on a Wheaties box in 1936. As a member of the Chicago Bears, Manske played his last professional game in the memorable 73–0 playoff win over Washington.

Manske was involved in a trade considered among the most lopsided in NFL history. In 1938, he was traded from Chicago to the Pittsburgh Pirates for the Pirates' first-round selection (#2 overall) in the upcoming 1939 NFL draft. The Bears then drafted future Hall of Fame quarterback Sid Luckman. Manske re-signed with the Bears later in 1939, leaving Pittsburgh with nothing to show for its top pick.

== Military career ==
One of 995 NFL players who served during World War II, Manske joined the Navy as a lieutenant commander. During officer training at the St. Mary's Preflight School in 1942, he also played on the team and earned All-Service All-America honors.

== Coaching and teaching career ==
Manske began his coaching career at the College of the Holy Cross in 1941. After the war, he returned to coach at Boston University and the University of Maryland, then worked as an assistant coach for the University of California, Berkeley under Pappy Waldorf from 1947 to 1952, facing his former Northwestern team in the 1949 Rose Bowl.

Manske eventually became an educator, and taught biology at Berkeley High School from 1955 until his retirement in 1975.

== Personal life and honors ==
Manske was married for 53 years to 1928 Olympian and 1932 Summer Olympics bronze medalist, Jane Fauntz.

In 1988 Manske was inducted into the Northwestern Athletics Hall of Fame and in 1989 he was inducted into the College Football Hall of Fame.
