= 1935 NFL season =

American football season

Regular season
- Duration: September 13 – December 15, 1935
- East Champions: New York Giants
- West Champions: Detroit Lions

Championship Game
- Champions: Detroit Lions

NFL teams: West, East

The 1935 NFL season was the 16th regular season of the National Football League. The season ended with the Detroit Lions' 26–7 victory over the New York Giants in the NFL Championship Game.

== Overview ==
Were it not for the cancellation of a Redskins–Eagles game on November 17 due to heavy rain and snow, all of the teams would have played 12 games, which would have made 1935 the first season in which all NFL teams played the same number of games. The standardization of the league's schedule was formalized the following year and has continued ever since, with the number of games being slowly increased to 14 by 1961, 16 by 1978, and 17 by 2021.

The next season to have any teams play a different amount of regular season games was in 2022, when a Bills–Bengals game on January 2 was declared a no contest due to the in-game collapse of Damar Hamlin.

This marked the last season until 2023 that every team in one division finished with a winning record, in this case the NFL West.

== Teams ==
With the loss of the Cincinnati franchise and its St. Louis successor at the end of the 1934 NFL season, the league stood with a total of just 9 teams, split into divisions of unequal sizes. All of these teams, or their lineage, in the case of the Dodgers, have continued through into the modern NFL.

Team	Head coach	Stadium
Boston Redskins	Eddie Casey	Fenway Park
Brooklyn Dodgers	Paul J. Schissler	Ebbets Field
Chicago Bears	George Halas	Wrigley Field
Chicago Cardinals	Milan Creighton	Comiskey Park
Detroit Lions	George Clark	University of Detroit Stadium
Green Bay Packers	Curly Lambeau	City Stadium and Wisconsin State Fair Park
New York Giants	Steve Owen	Polo Grounds
Philadelphia Eagles	Lud Wray	Phillies Park
Pittsburgh Pirates	Joe Bach	Forbes Field

== Major rule changes ==
- The inbounds lines or hashmarks, introduced two years earlier in 1933, were moved closer to the center of the field, from 10 yards to 15 yards from the sidelines, or 70 feet apart.

This width lasted for ten seasons, through 1944. The hashmarks were moved to 20 yards from the sidelines (40 feet apart) in 1945, which lasted for 27 seasons. They were moved in to the width of the goalposts (18½ feet) in 1972.

== Division races ==
In the Eastern Division, the key game took place on Thanksgiving Day at Ebbets Field in Brooklyn, as the 5–4 Dodgers hosted the 6–3 Giants. A Brooklyn win would have tied the teams at 6–4, but New York won, 21–0, and went on to victories in their remaining two games to win the division championship comfortably at 9–3.

In the Western Division, all 4 teams were in a close race. On Thanksgiving Day the Lions defeated the Bears 14-2 while the Cardinals won over the Packers 9–7, leaving the Lions at 6–3–2 and the Cardinals at 6–3–1. Three days later on December 1, the Lions defeated Brooklyn 28–0, while the Cardinals tied the Bears 7–7. With this win, Detroit finished its season at 7–3–2 and eliminated the Packers and Bears from contention, while the Cardinals stood at 6–3–2 with another game against the Bears coming up on December 8. The Cardinals needed to win in order to force a playoff for the division title. However, the Bears won 13–0, and the Lions were the division champs.

Had the current (post-1972) system of counting ties as half a win and half a loss been in place in 1935, the Packers at 8–4–0 would have tied the 7–3–2 Lions for the Western Division title with .667, requiring a playoff game. This was the last season until 2023 that an entire division finished with a winning record.

== Final standings ==
NFL Eastern Division
	W	L	T	PCT	DIV	PF	PA	STK
New York Giants	9	3	0	.750	8–0	180	96	W5
Brooklyn Dodgers	5	6	1	.455	3–4–1	90	141	T1
Pittsburgh Pirates	4	8	0	.333	3–5	100	209	L3
Boston Redskins	2	8	1	.200	2–4–1	65	123	T1
Philadelphia Eagles	2	9	0	.182	2–5	60	179	L5

Note: Tie games were not officially counted in the standings until 1972.

NFL Western Division
	W	L	T	PCT	DIV	PF	PA	STK
Detroit Lions	7	3	2	.700	3–2–2	191	111	W2
Green Bay Packers	8	4	0	.667	4–4	181	96	W1
Chicago Cardinals	6	4	2	.600	3–2–2	99	97	L1
Chicago Bears	6	4	2	.600	1–3–2	192	106	W1

== NFL Championship Game ==
Detroit 26, N.Y. Giants 7, at University of Detroit Stadium, in Detroit, Michigan, on December 15.

== Statistical leaders ==
The 1935 season marked the fourth year in which official statistics were tracked and retained by the NFL. Certain statistics later regarded as staples were not maintained, including interceptions, punting average, kickoff return yardage and average, and field goal percentage, among others.

In the table below, ‡ denotes a new NFL record.

	Name	Team	Yards
Passing	1. Ed Danowski	New York Giants	794
	2. Arnie "Flash" Herber	Green Bay Packers	729
	3. Johnny Gildea	Pittsburgh Pirates	529
Rushing	1. Doug Russell	Chicago Cardinals	499
	2. Ernie Caddel	Detroit Lions	450
	3. Kink Richards	New York Giants	449
Receiving	1. Charley Malone	Boston Redskins	433
	2. Tod Goodwin	New York Giants	432
	3. Don Hutson	Green Bay Packers	420
Touchdowns	1. Don Hutson	Green Bay Packers	7
	2. Dale Burnett	New York Giants	6
	2. Ernie Caddel	Detroit Lions	6
	2. Dutch Clark	Detroit Lions	6
	2. Bill Karr	Chicago Bears	6

Source: Pete Palmer, et al. (eds.), The ESPN Pro Football Encyclopedia. First Edition. New York: Sterling Publishing, 2006; p. 1043.

== Coaching changes ==
- Boston Redskins: William Dietz was replaced by Eddie Casey.
- Brooklyn Dodgers: Cap McEwen was replaced by Paul J. Schissler.
- Chicago Cardinals: Paul J. Schissler was replaced by Milan Creighton.
- Pittsburgh Pirates: Luby DiMeolo was replaced by Joe Bach.
