= 1934 Philadelphia Eagles season =

NFL team season

- Owner: Bert Bell
- Head coach: Lud Wray
- Home stadium: National League Park

Results
- Record: 4–7
- Division place: 3rd NFL Eastern
- Playoffs: Did not qualify

The 1934 Philadelphia Eagles season was their second in the league. The team failed to improve on their previous output of 3–5–1, losing seven games. They failed to qualify for the playoffs for the second consecutive season. However, on an interesting note, all of Philadelphia's wins were shutouts. Not only that, but the team allowed 7.7 points per game (the best in franchise history). They allowed 6 points or less 5 times, and were 4–1 in those games.

If one excludes the 1920 Rochester Jeffersons' victory over the non-league team Fort Porter, the Eagles' 64–0 defeat of the Cincinnati Reds remains the largest regular season shutout in league history as of 2023.

== Off season ==
The Eagles held their preseason training camp at Bader Field in the New Jersey resort city of Atlantic City, New Jersey.

== Regular season ==
=== Schedule ===
Game	Date	Opponent	Result	Record	Venue	Attendance	Recap	Sources
1	September 16	at Green Bay Packers	L 6–19	0–1	City Stadium	5,000	Recap	
2	September 26	at Pittsburgh Pirates	W 17–0	1–1	Forbes Field	11,559	Recap	
3	October 7	Pittsburgh Pirates	L 7–9	1–2	Baker Bowl	9,000	Recap	
4	October 14	Detroit Lions	L 0–10	1–3	Baker Bowl	9,860	Recap	
5	October 21	at Boston Redskins	L 0–6	1–4	Fenway Park	10,344	Recap	
6	October 28	at New York Giants	L 0–17	1–5	Polo Grounds	8,500	Recap	
7	November 6	Cincinnati Reds	W 64–0	2–5	Temple Stadium	2,000	Recap	
8	November 11	Brooklyn Dodgers	L 7–10	2–6	Baker Bowl	8,000	Recap	
9	November 18	Boston Redskins	L 7–14	2–7	Baker Bowl	8,500	Recap	
10	November 25	at Brooklyn Dodgers	W 13–0	3–7	Ebbets Field	8,000	Recap	
11	December 2	New York Giants	W 6–0	4–7	Baker Bowl	12,471	Recap	
Note: November 6: Tuesday.

== Standings ==
Rookie halfback Ed Matesic on the cover of the program for the October 14 contest against the Lions.

NFL Eastern Division
	W	L	T	PCT	DIV	PF	PA	STK
New York Giants	8	5	0	.615	7–1	147	107	L1
Boston Redskins	6	6	0	.500	5–3	107	94	W1
Brooklyn Dodgers	4	7	0	.364	4–4	61	153	L3
Philadelphia Eagles	4	7	0	.364	3–5	127	85	W2
Pittsburgh Pirates	2	10	0	.167	1–7	51	206	L7

Note: Tie games were not officially counted in the standings until 1972.

== Roster ==
Members of the 1934 Philadelphia Eagles team.

(All time List of Philadelphia Eagles players in franchise history)

Being a 2nd year expansion team the Eagles were mostly stocked with Rookies and 1st or 2nd years players. This was before the NFL draft was started. All the NFL teams competed for the same players in an open market.

A List of the 1934 Philadelphia Eagles.

NO.	Player	AGE	POS	GP	GS	WT	HT	YRS	College
	Lud Wray	40	Coach	_{1934 record} 4–7	_{As Eagles Coach} 7–12–1	_{NFL Lifetime} 11–16–3		2nd	Pennsylvania
	Dan Barnhart	22	HB	1	0	200	6–0	Rookie	Centenary and St. Mary's (CA)
	Joe Carter	24	E	11	10	201	6–1	1	Austin and SMU
	Algy Clark	?	B	3	0	190	5–10	4	Ohio State
	Paul Cuba	26	T	10	10	212	6–0	1	Pittsburgh
	Jack Dempsey	22	T	1	0	225	6–2	Rookie	Bucknell
	Swede Ellstrom	28	HB	8	7	203	6–1	Rookie	Oklahoma
	Bob Gonya	24	T	9	1	208	6–2	1	Northwewstern
	Len Gudd	24	E	1	0	212	6–3	Rookie	Temple
	Chuck Hajek	24	C	11	2	210	6–1	Rookie	Northwestern and South Carolina
	Swede Hanson	27	B	11	8	192	6–1	3	Temple
	Lorne Johnson	25	FB	1	0	195	6–2	Rookie	Temple
	George Kavel	24	HB	1	0	170	5–11	Rookie	Carnegie Mellon
	George Kenneally	32	E	11	10	190	6–1	8	St. Bonaventure University
	Red Kirkman	29	B	10	7	195	6–1	1	Case Western Reserve and Washington & Jefferson
	Jack Knapper	24	B	2	0	190	6–3	Rookie	Ottawa (KS)
	Joe Kresky	28	G-T	10	6	215	6–0	2	Wisconsin
	Rick Lackman	24	HB	8	0	186	5–11	1	none
	Jim Leonard	24	B	9	5	204	6–0	Rookie	Notre Dame
	John Lipski	?	C	10	9	200	5–11	1	Temple
	Jim MacMurdo	25	T-G	11	11	209	6–1	2	Pittsburgh
	Ed Matesic	27	HB	11	11	198	6–1	Rookie	Pittsburgh
	Barnes Milam	28	G-T	2	0	190	6–2	Rookie	Austin
	John Norby	24	HB	1	0	195	6–0	Rookie	Idaho
	Joe Pilconis	23	E	9	2	189	6–1	Rookie	Temple
	Phil Poth	23	G	1	0	195	5–11	Rookie	Gonzaga
	Jack Roberts	24	B	1	1	210	6–0	2	Georgia
	Ed Storm	27	B	10	5	195	6–1	1	Santa Clara
	Guy Turnbow	26	T-E	2	0	217	6–2	Rookie	Mississippi
	Reds Weiner	23	B	5	0	180	5–9	Rookie	Muhlenberg
	Diddie Willson	23	G-E	11	11	196	5–10	1	Pennsylvania
	Vince Zizak	26	G-T	6	1	208	5–8	Rookie	Villanova
	Jim Zyntell	24	G	8	5	200	6–1	1	Holy Cross
	32 Players; Team Average	23.6		11		199.4	6–0.3	0.9	

== Awards and honors ==
- Tom "Swede" Hanson ties as NFL Leader in Rushing Attempts with 146 attempts
- Tom Hanson finishes 2nd in yards rushing with 805 yards.
- Joe Carter ties for league lead with 16 receptions, and Receiving yards with 14.9 yards/catch.
- Joe Carter finished 2nd in 4 Receiving TDs
- Ed Matesic ties for league lead in Interception TD Returns with 1
- Al Weiner finished the season with only 1 FG with. The leader Jack Manders had 10, and 5 finished second with 4 each.
