= 1934 Pittsburgh Pirates (NFL) season =

2nd season of NFL team Pittsburgh Steelers

1934 Pittsburgh Pirates season
- Owner: Art Rooney
- Head coach: Luby DiMeolo
- Home stadium: Forbes Field

Results
- Record: 2–10
- Division place: 5th NFL Eastern
- Playoffs: Did not qualify

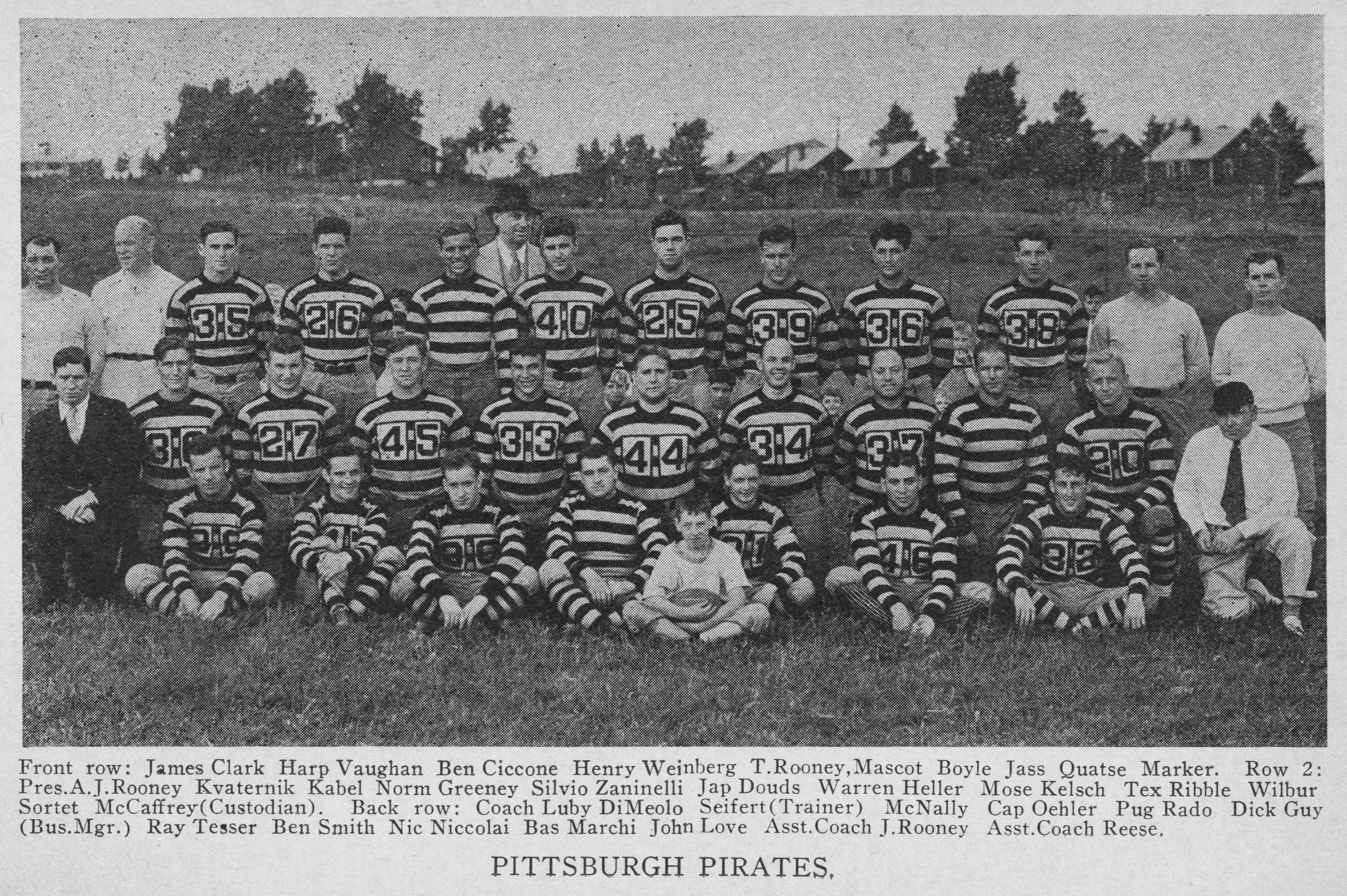
Official team photo of the 1934 Pittsburgh Pirates.

The 1934 Pittsburgh Pirates season was the team's second season following its formation during the previous year. The team, which would later be renamed the Pittsburgh Steelers in 1940, began the season with a new head coach, Luby DiMeolo. Despite the change in leadership, the Pirates once again finished in 5th place in the NFL's Eastern Division.

The Pirates endured a dismal 2–10 season, during which they were shut out in six games and scored more than 10 points in only two games.

A notable storyline from the season was the arrival of All-Pro and future Hall of Famer Johnny Blood, who joined the team for one season after playing with the Green Bay Packers. However, McNally's time with the Pirates had little impact, and he returned to the Packers the following season.

Another defining feature of the 1934 Pirates was their "jailbird" uniforms. These uniforms, which featured horizontal stripes, were mocked by opponents and fans alike, as the team was frequently compared to convicts. While the modern-day Pittsburgh Steelers wore a throwback version of these uniforms from 2012 to 2016 (albeit with updated black and gold colors, leading to the "bumblebee" nickname), the original "jailbird" uniforms were only used during the 1934 season due to widespread ridicule.

== Regular season ==
=== Schedule ===
Week	Date	Opponent	Result	Record	Venue
1	September 9	Cincinnati Reds	**W** 13–0	1–0	Forbes Field
2	September 16	**Boston Redskins**	**L** 0–7	1–1	Forbes Field
3	September 26	**Philadelphia Eagles**	**L** 0–17	1–2	Forbes Field
4	October 3	**New York Giants**	**L** 12–14	1–3	Forbes Field
5	October 7	at **Philadelphia Eagles**	**W** 9–7	2–3	Baker Bowl
6	October 10	Chicago Bears	**L** 0–28	2–4	Forbes Field
7	October 14	at **Boston Redskins**	**L** 0–39	2–5	Fenway Park
8	October 21	at **New York Giants**	**L** 7–17	2–6	Polo Grounds
9	October 28	at **Brooklyn Dodgers**	**L** 3–21	2–7	Ebbets Field
10	November 4	at Detroit Lions	**L** 7–40	2–8	University of Detroit Stadium
11	November 11	at St. Louis Gunners	**L** 0–6	2–9	Sportsman's Park
12	November 18	**Brooklyn Dodgers**	**L** 0–10	2–10	Forbes Field
Note: Intra-division opponents are in **bold** text.

== Standings ==
NFL Eastern Division
	W	L	T	PCT	DIV	PF	PA	STK
New York Giants	8	5	0	.615	7–1	147	107	L1
Boston Redskins	6	6	0	.500	5–3	107	94	W1
Brooklyn Dodgers	4	7	0	.364	4–4	61	153	L3
Philadelphia Eagles	4	7	0	.364	3–5	127	85	W2
Pittsburgh Pirates	2	10	0	.167	1–7	51	206	L7

Note: Tie games were not officially counted in the standings until 1972.

=== Game summaries ===
==== Week 1 (Sunday September 9, 1934): Cincinnati Reds ====
	1	2	3	4	Total
Reds	0	0	0	0	0
Pirates	0	7	0	6	13

at Forbes Field, Pittsburgh, Pennsylvania

- Game time:
- Game weather:
- Game attendance: 14,164
- Referee:
- TV announcers:

Scoring drives:

- Pittsburgh – Clark 27 lateral from Sorlet after pass from Heller (Kelsch kick)
- Pittsburgh – FG Kelsch 13
- Pittsburgh – FG Niccolai 13

==== Week 2 (Sunday September 16, 1934): Boston Redskins ====
	1	2	3	4	Total
Redskins	0	0	7	0	7
Pirates	0	0	0	0	0

at Forbes Field, Pittsburgh, Pennsylvania

- Game time:
- Game weather:
- Game attendance: 17,171
- Referee:
- TV announcers:

Scoring drives:

- Boston – Malone 16 pass from Hokuf (Battles kick)

==== Week 3 (Wednesday September 26, 1934): Philadelphia Eagles ====
	1	2	3	4	Total
Eagles	0	7	7	3	17
Pirates	0	0	0	0	0

at Forbes Field, Pittsburgh, Pennsylvania

- Game time:
- Game weather:
- Game attendance: 11,559
- Referee:
- TV announcers:

Scoring drives:

- Philadelphia – Hanson 16 run (Hanson kick)
- Philadelphia – Hanson 34 pass from Kirkman (Hajek kick)
- Philadelphia – FG Wiener 17

==== Week 4 (Wednesday October 3, 1934): New York Giants ====
	1	2	3	4	Total
Giants	7	0	7	0	14
Pirates	6	6	0	0	12

at Forbes Field, Pittsburgh, Pennsylvania

- Game time:
- Game weather:
- Game attendance: 13,020
- Referee:
- TV announcers:

Scoring drives:

- New York – Badgro 25 pass from Newman (Newman kick)
- Pittsburgh – Skladany 28 pass from Heller (kick failed)
- Pittsburgh – Heller 2 run (kick failed)
- New York – Strong 7 run (Newman kick)

==== Week 5 (Sunday October 7, 1934): Philadelphia Eagles ====
	1	2	3	4	Total
Pirates	3	0	0	6	9
Eagles	0	0	0	7	7

at Baker Bowl, Philadelphia, Pennsylvania

- Game time:
- Game weather:
- Game attendance: 9,000
- Referee:
- TV announcers:

Scoring drives:

- Pittsburgh – FG Niccolai 28
- Pittsburgh – Brovelli 5 run (kick blocked)
- Philadelphia – Gonya 4 pass from Barnhardt (Kirkman kick)

==== Week 6 (Wednesday October 10, 1934): Chicago Bears ====
	1	2	3	4	Total
Bears	7	7	0	14	28
Pirates	0	0	0	0	0

at Forbes Field, Pittsburgh, Pennsylvania

- Game time:
- Game weather:
- Game attendance: 19,386
- Referee:
- TV announcers:

Scoring drives:

- Chicago – Ronzani 6 pass from Burmbaugh (Manders kick)
- Chicago – Feathers 82 run (Manders kick)
- Chicago – Molesworth 2 run (Manders kick)
- Chicago – Johnsos 3 pass from Molesworth (Manders kick)

==== Week 7 (Sunday October 14, 1934): Boston Redskins ====
	1	2	3	4	Total
Pirates	0	0	0	0	0
Redskins	13	6	20	0	39

at Fenway Park, Boston, Massachusetts

- Game time:
- Game weather:
- Game attendance: 15,515
- Referee:
- TV announcers:

Scoring drives:

- Boston – Malone pass from Hokuf (kick failed)
- Boston – Battles run (Wright kick)
- Boston – Battles 19 run (kick failed)
- Boston – Wright 59 run (Wright kick)
- Boston – Pinckert run (kick failed)
- Boston – McPhail 14 fumble return (McPhail kick)

==== Week 8 (Sunday October 21, 1934): New York Giants ====
	1	2	3	4	Total
Pirates	0	0	0	7	7
Giants	3	0	7	7	17

at Polo Grounds, New York, New York

- Game time:
- Game weather:
- Game attendance: 11,000
- Referee:
- TV announcers:

Scoring drives:

- New York – FG Strong 44
- New York – Strong 2 run (Strong kick)
- New York – Smith 3 run (Molenda kick)
- Pittsburgh – Sortet 21 pass from Vaughn (Kelsck kick)

==== Week 9 (Sunday October 28, 1934): Brooklyn Dodgers ====
	1	2	3	4	Total
Pirates	3	0	0	0	3
Dodgers	7	0	0	14	21

at Ebbets Field, Brooklyn, New York

- Game time:
- Game weather:
- Game attendance: 8,000
- Referee:
- TV announcers:

Scoring drives:

- Brooklyn – Grossman 72-yard punt return (Kercheval kick)
- Pittsburgh – FG Niccolai 50 yards
- Brooklyn – Grossman 26-yard pass from Cagle (Kercheval kick)
- Brooklyn – Kercheval 15-yard pass from Montgomery (Kercheval kick)

This game was the first in NFL history in which neither team committed a single penalty.

==== Week 10 (Sunday November 4, 1934): Detroit Lions ====
	1	2	3	4	Total
Pirates	7	0	0	6	13
Lions	7	13	13	7	40

at University of Detroit Stadium, Detroit, Michigan

- Game time:
- Game weather:
- Game attendance: 6,000
- Referee:
- TV announcers:

Scoring drives:

- Pittsburgh – Skladany 62 pass from Vaughn (Niccolai kick)
- Detroit – F. Christensen 1 run (Clark kick)
- Detroit – Clark 45 run (kick failed)
- Detroit – Ebding 37 pass from Caddel (Clark kick)

==== Week 11 (Sunday November 11, 1934): St. Louis Gunners ====
	1	2	3	4	Total
Pirates	0	0	0	0	0
Gunners	0	6	0	0	6

at Sportsman's Park, St. Louis, Missouri

- Game time:
- Game weather:
- Game attendance: 13,678
- Referee:
- TV announcers:

Scoring drives:

- St. Louis – FG Senn 35
- St. Louis – FG Alford 12

==== Week 12 (Sunday November 18, 1934): Brooklyn Dodgers ====
	1	2	3	4	Total
Dodgers	0	0	10	0	10
Pirates	0	0	0	0	0

at Forbes Field, Pittsburgh, Pennsylvania

- Game time:
- Game weather:
- Game attendance: 9,087
- Referee:
- TV announcers:

Scoring drives:

- Brooklyn – Kercheval 23 pass from Cagle (Kercheval kick)
- Brooklyn – FG Kercheval 22

== Roster ==
Player	Age	Pos	G	GS	Wt	Ht	College/Univ	Birth Date	Yrs
Angelo Brovelli	24	B	5	5	193	6’0	St. Mary's (CA)	August 21, 1910	1
Ben Ciccone	25	C	11	0	197	5’10	Duquesne	October 10, 1909	R
James Clark	–	B	9	3	170	5’9	Pittsburgh	unknown	1
Jack Dempsey	22	T	1	1	225	6’2	Bucknell	March 12, 1912	R
Jap Douds	29	T-G-C	11	8	216	5’10	Washington & Jefferson	April 21, 1905	4
Norm Greeney	24	G	11	3	212	5’11	Notre Dame	May 7, 1910	1
Warren Heller	24	HB-TB	12	12	195	5’11	Pittsburgh	November 24, 1910	R
George Kavel	24	HB	1	1	170	5’11	Carnegie Mellon	March 3, 1910	R
Mose Kelsch	37	FB-HB	8	0	223	5’10	none	January 31, 1897	1
Zvonimir Kvaternik	23	G	1	0	210	5’11	Kansas	October 18, 1911	R
Jim Levey	28	B	1	1	156	5’10	none	September 13, 1906	R
Basilio Marchi	25	G-C	5	4	220	6’2	NYU	July 14, 1909	R
Harry Marker	24	B	1	0	155	5’6	West Virginia	September 17, 1910	R
Johnny Blood	31	TB-HB-WB-BB-DB	5	1	188	6’1	N.D., St. John's (MN), Wis-River Falls	November 27, 1903	9
Buster Mott	25	B	1	0	193	5’8	Georgia	June 21, 1909	1
Armand Niccolai	23	T-G	12	12	226	6’2	Duquesne	November 8, 1911	R
Cap Oehler	24	C-LB	12	12	204	6’0	Purdue	August 5, 1910	1
Bill Potts	–	HB	1	0	200		Villanova	unknown	R
Jess Quatse	26	T	12	12	226	5’11	Pittsburgh	April 4, 1908	1
Alex Rado	23	HB-DB	8	4	200	6’1	West Virginia Tech	July 19, 1911	R
Peter Rajkovich	23	FB-LB	3	3	190	5’10	Detroit Mercy	January 17, 1911	R
Dave Ribble	27	G-T	10	8	225	6’1	Hardin-Simmons	March 28, 1907	2
Jack Roberts	24	B	6	0	210	6’0	Georgia	September 27, 1910	2
Pete Saumer	24	B	3	0	195	6’1	St. Olaf	April 30, 1910	R
Joe Skladany	23	E	12	12	210	5’10	Pittsburgh	May 25, 1911	R
Ben Smith	23	E-BB-DE	11	10	208	6’3	Alabama	June 16, 1911	1
Bill Snyder	23	G	5	0	230	6’2	Ohio	October 29, 1911	R
Bill Sortet	22	E	12	1	187	6’1	West Virginia	June 25, 1912	1
Ray Tesser	22	E-DE	12	1	204	6’2	Carnegie Mellon	June 2, 1912	1
Harp Vaughan	31	B	11	7	150	5’7	none	November 19, 1903	1
Henry Weinberg	24	G-T	8	1	190	5’7	Duquesne	March 4, 1910	R
Silvio Zaninelli	21	B	11	11	207	5’10	Duquesne	December 9, 1913	R
