= 1934 New York Giants season =

NFL team 10th season

- Owner: Tim Mara
- Head coach: Steve Owen
- Home stadium: Polo Grounds

Results
- Record: 8–5
- Division place: 1st NFL Eastern
- Playoffs: Won NFL Championship (vs. Bears) 30–13

The 1934 New York Giants season was the franchise's tenth in the National Football League (NFL). On a frozen field at the Polo Grounds, the host Giants upset the undefeated Chicago Bears 30–13 in the league championship game, which became known as the "Sneakers Game".

== Preseason ==
Week	Date	Opponent	Result	Record	Game site	Reference
1	September 9	New Rochelle Bulldogs	W 28–6	1–0	City Park Stadium	

== Schedule ==
Game	Date	Opponent	Result	Record	Venue	Attendance	Recap	Sources
1	September 23	at Detroit Lions	**L** 0–9	0–1	University of Detroit Stadium	12,000	Recap	
2	September 30	at Green Bay Packers	**L** 6–20	0–2	Wisconsin State Fair Park	11,000	Recap	
3	October 3	at **Pittsburgh Pirates**	**W** 14–12	1–2	Forbes Field	13,020	Recap	
4	October 7	at **Boston Redskins**	**W** 16–13	2–2	Fenway Park	17,033	Recap	
5	October 14	**Brooklyn Dodgers**	**W** 14–0	3–2	Polo Grounds	30,000	Recap	
6	October 21	**Pittsburgh Pirates**	**W** 17–7	4–2	Polo Grounds	11,000	Recap	
7	October 28	**Philadelphia Eagles**	**W** 17–0	5–2	Polo Grounds	8,500	Recap	
8	November 4	at Chicago Bears	**L** 7–27	5–3	Wrigley Field	25,000	Recap	
9	November 11	Green Bay Packers	**W** 17–3	6–3	Polo Grounds	22,000	Recap	
10	November 18	Chicago Bears	**L** 9–10	6–4	Polo Grounds	45,404	Recap	
11	November 25	**Boston Redskins**	**W** 3–0	7–4	Polo Grounds	17,435	Recap	
12	November 29	at **Brooklyn Dodgers**	**W** 27–0	8–4	Ebbets Field	15,000	Recap	
13	December 2	at **Philadelphia Eagles**	**L** 0–6	8–5	Shibe Park	12,471	Recap	
Note: Intra-division opponents are in **bold** text. Thanksgiving: November 29.

== Game summaries ==
=== Game 1: at Detroit Lions ===
Week Three: New York Giants at Detroit Lions

Quarter	1	2	3	4	Total
Giants	0	0	0	0	0
Lions	0	3	0	6	9

at Titan Stadium, Detroit, Michigan

- Date: September 23
- Game attendance: 12,000

Game information

Second quarter

- DET Dutch Clark 11-yard FG

Fourth quarter

- DET Father Lumpkin 45-yard interception return (kick failed)

=== Game 2: at Green Bay Packers ===
Week Four: New York Giants at Green Bay Packers

Quarter	1	2	3	4	Total
Giants	0	0	0	6	6
Packers	0	3	10	7	20

at Dairy Bowl, Milwaukee, Wisconsin

- Date: September 30
- Game attendance: 11,000

Game information

Second quarter

- GB Bob Monnett 20-yard FG

Third quarter

- GB Monnett 20-yard FG
- GB Roger Grove 22-yard run (Monnett kick)

Fourth quarter

- NYG Kink Richards 32-yard run (pass failed)
- GB Buckets Goldenberg 2-yard run (Monnett kick)

=== Game 3: at Pittsburgh Pirates ===
Week Five: New York Giants at Pittsburgh Pirates

Quarter	1	2	3	4	Total
Giants	7	0	7	0	14
Pirates	6	6	0	0	12

at Forbes Field, Pittsburgh, Pennsylvania

- Date: October 3 (Wednesday)
- Game attendance: 13,020

Game information

First quarter

- NYG Red Badgro 25-yard pass from Harry Newman (Newman kick)
- PIT Joe Skladany 28-yard pass from Warren Heller (kick failed)

Second quarter

- PIT Heller 2-yard run (kick failed)

Third quarter

- NYG Ken Strong 7-yard run (Newman kick)

=== Game 4: at Boston Redskins ===
Week Five: New York Giants at Boston Redskins

Quarter	1	2	3	4	Total
Giants	10	0	0	6	16
Redskins	0	0	13	0	13

at Fenway Park, Boston, Massachusetts

- Date: October 7
- Game attendance: 17,033

Game information

First quarter

- NYG Newman 93-yard kickoff return (Newman kick)
- NYG Newman 30-yard FG

Third quarter

- BOS Hal McPhail 55-yard fumble return (McPhail kick)
- BOS Doug Wycoff run (kick failed)

Fourth quarter

- NYG Newman 26-yard FG
- NYG Newman 20-yard FG

=== Game 5: vs. Brooklyn Dodgers ===
Week Six: Brooklyn Dodgers at New York Giants

Quarter	1	2	3	4	Total
Dodgers	0	0	0	0	0
Giants	7	0	7	0	14

at Polo Grounds, New York, New York

- Date: October 14
- Game attendance: 30,000

Game information

First quarter

- NYG Strong run (Newman kick)

Third quarter

- NYG Strong run (Strong kick)

=== Game 6: vs. Pittsburgh Pirates ===
Week Seven: Pittsburgh Pirates at New York Giants

Quarter	1	2	3	4	Total
Pirates	0	0	0	7	7
Giants	3	0	7	7	17

at Polo Grounds, New York, New York

- Date: October 21
- Game attendance: 11,000

Game information

First quarter

- NYG Strong 44-yard FG

Third quarter

- NYG Strong 2-yard run (Strong kick)

Fourth quarter

- NYG Strong 3-yard run (Bo Molenda kick)
- PIT Bill Sortet 21-yard pass from Harp Vaughan (Mose Kelsch kick)

=== Game 7: vs. Philadelphia Eagles ===
Week Eight: Philadelphia Eagles at New York Giants

Quarter	1	2	3	4	Total
Eagles	0	0	0	0	0
Giants	0	7	0	10	17

at Polo Grounds, New York, New York

- Date: October 28
- Game attendance: 8,500

Game information

Second quarter

- NYG Strong 1-yard run (Strong kick)

Fourth quarter

- NYG Strong 10-yard FG
- NYG Wee Willie Smith 23-yard run (Strong kick)

=== Game 8: at Chicago Bears ===
Week Nine: New York Giants at Chicago Bears

Quarter	1	2	3	4	Total
Giants	0	0	0	7	7
Bears	14	0	7	6	27

at Wrigley Field, Chicago, Illinois

- Date: November 4
- Game attendance: 25,000

Game information

First quarter

- CHB Bill Karr 49-yard pass from Carl Brumbaugh (Jack Manders kick)
- CHB Bronko Nagurski run (Manders kick)

Third quarter

- CHB Brumbaugh 11-yard pass from Beattie Feathers (Manders kick)

Fourth quarter

- NYG Newman 4-yard run (Newman kick)
- CHB Red Grange 36-yard pass from George Corbett (kick failed)

=== Game 9: vs. Green Bay Packers ===
Week Ten: Green Bay Packers at New York Giants

Quarter	1	2	3	4	Total
Packers	3	0	0	0	3
Giants	3	0	14	0	17

at Polo Grounds, New York, New York

- Date: November 11
- Game attendance: 22,000

Game information

First quarter

- GB Clarke Hinkle 19-yard FG
- NYG Strong 18-yard FG

Third quarter

- NYG Newman 12-yard run (Strong kick)
- NYG Newman 1-yard run (Strong kick)

=== Game 10: vs. Chicago Bears ===
Week Eleven: Chicago Bears at New York Giants

Quarter	1	2	3	4	Total
Bears	0	0	0	10	10
Giants	0	7	2	0	9

at Polo Grounds, New York, New York

- Date: November 18
- Game attendance: 55,000

Game information

Second quarter

- NYG Strong 4-yard run (Strong kick)

Third quarter

- NYG Giants tackled Corbett in end zone for a Safety

Fourth quarter

- CHB Feathers 12-yard run (Manders kick)
- CHB Manders 24-yard FG

=== Game 11: vs. Boston Redskins ===
Week Twelve: Boston Redskins at New York Giants

Quarter	1	2	3	4	Total
Redskins	0	0	0	0	0
Giants	0	3	0	0	3

at Polo Grounds, New York, New York

- Date: November 25
- Game attendance: 20,000

Game information

Second quarter

- NYG Strong 14-yard FG

=== Game 12: at Brooklyn Dodgers ===
Week Thirteen: New York Giants at Brooklyn Dodgers

Quarter	1	2	3	4	Total
Giants	13	14	0	0	27
Dodgers	0	0	0	0	0

at Ebbets Field, Brooklyn, New York

- Date: November 29 (Thursday)
- Game attendance: 15,000

Game information

First quarter

- NYG Ray Flaherty 26-yard pass from Ed Danowski (Jack McBride kick)
- NYG Dale Burnett pass from Danowski (kick failed)

Second quarter

- NYG Burnett pass from McBride (Molenda kick)
- NYG Richards 20-yard pass from Smith (Richards kick)

=== Game 13: at Philadelphia Eagles ===
Week Thirteen: New York Giants at Philadelphia Eagles

Quarter	1	2	3	4	Total
Giants	0	0	0	0	0
Eagles	0	6	0	0	6

at Shibe Park, Philadelphia, Pennsylvania

- Date: December 2
- Game attendance: 12,471

Game information

Second quarter

- PHI Jim Leonard 2-yard run (kick failed)

== NFL Championship Game ==
1934 NFL Championship: Chicago Bears at New York Giants

Quarter	1	2	3	4	Total
Bears	0	10	3	0	13
Giants	3	0	0	27	30

at Polo Grounds, New York, New York

- Date: December 9
- Game attendance: 35,059

Game information

First quarter

- NYG Strong 38-yard FG. Giants 3-0.

Second quarter

- CHB Nagurski 1-yard run (Manders kick). Bears 7-3.
- CHB Manders 17-yard FG. Bears 10-3.

Third quarter

- CHB Manders 24-yard FG. Bears 13-3.

Fourth quarter

- NYG Ike Frankian 28-yard pass from Danowski (Strong kick). Bears 13-10.
- NYG Strong 42-yard run (Strong kick). Giants 17-13.
- NYG Strong 11-yard run (kick failed). Giants 23-13.
- NYG Danowski 9-yard run (Molenda kick). Giants 30-13.

Top passers

- CHI - Keith Molesworth - 4/9, 60 yards, 1 INT
- NYG - Ed Danowski - 6/11, 83 yards, 1 TD, 2 INT

Top rushers

- CHI - Bronko Nagurski - 24 rushes, 68 yards, 1 TD
- NYG - Ken Strong - 9 rushes, 94 yards, 2 TD

Top receivers

- CHI - Bill Hewitt - 2 receptions, 30 yards
- NYG - Dale Burnett - 2 receptions, 30 yards

== Standings ==
NFL Eastern Division
	W	L	T	PCT	DIV	PF	PA	STK
New York Giants	8	5	0	.615	7–1	147	107	L1
Boston Redskins	6	6	0	.500	5–3	107	94	W1
Brooklyn Dodgers	4	7	0	.364	4–4	61	153	L3
Philadelphia Eagles	4	7	0	.364	3–5	127	85	W2
Pittsburgh Pirates	2	10	0	.167	1–7	51	206	L7

Note: Tie games were not officially counted in the standings until 1972.

== Roster ==
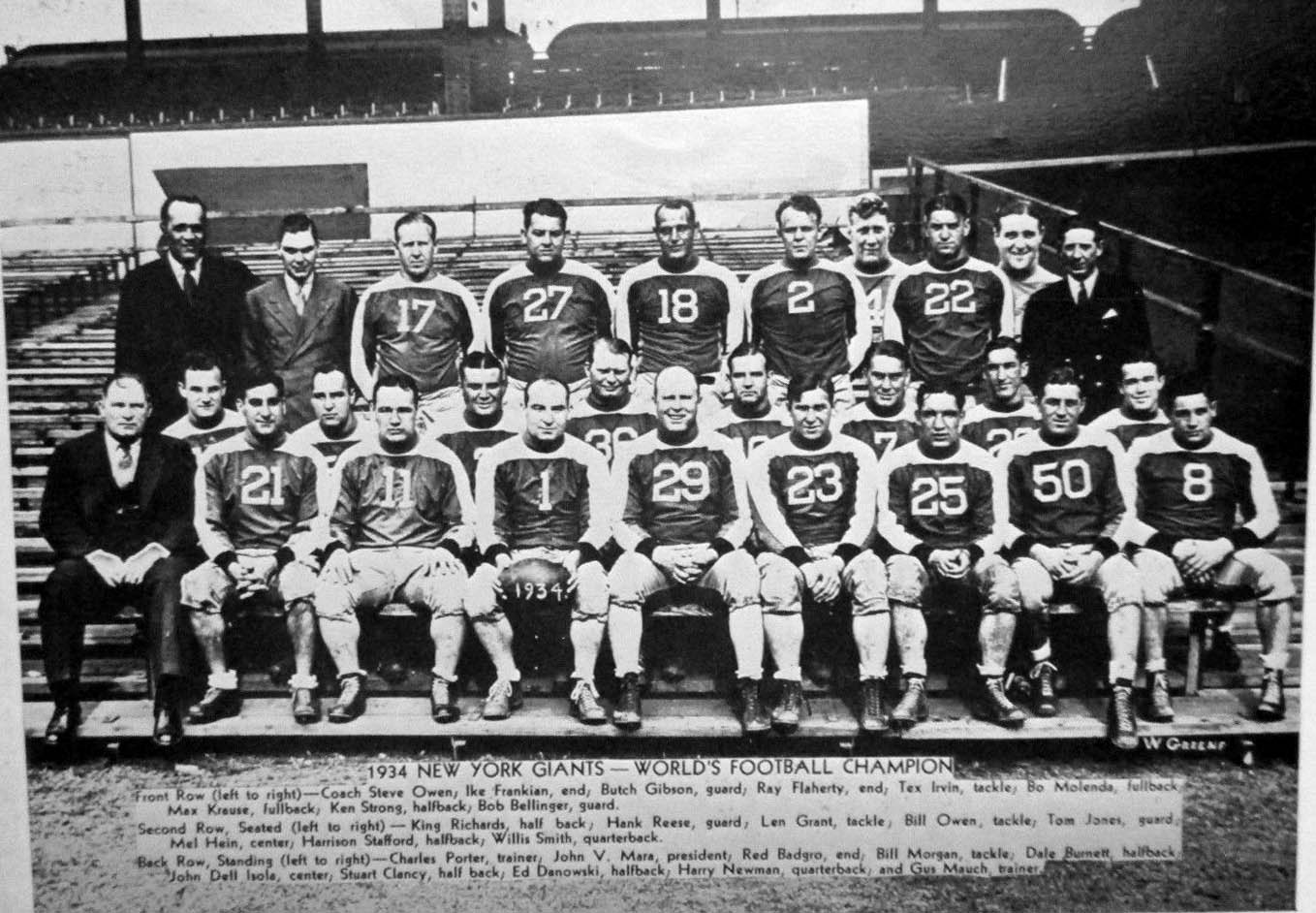
The 1934 New York Giants

1934 New York Giants final roster
Backs: 18 Dale Burnett RB/CB; 4 Stu Clancy RB/CB/S; 22 Ed Danowski RB/CB/S; 25 Max Krause FB/LB; 23 Bo Molenda FB/LB/K; 13 Kink Richards RB/CB; 0 Wee Willie Smith RB/CB/S; 20 Harry Stafford RB/CB; 50 Ken Strong RB/CB/S/K	Linemen: 8 Bob Bellinger G/DG; 2 Johnny Dell Isola C/MG; 11 Butch Gibson G/DG; 3 Len Grant T/DT; 7 Mel Hein C/MG; 29 Tex Irvin T/DT; 10 Potsy Jones G/DG; 27 Bill Morgan T/DT; 36 Bill Owen T/DT; 55 Hank Reese G/DG	Ends/Receivers: 17 Red Badgro; 1 Ray Flaherty; 21 Ike Frankian; Reserve: 12 Harry Newman RB/S/K (IR); rookies in italics

== See also ==
- List of New York Giants seasons
