= Wee Willie Smith (American football) =

American football player (1910–1996)

No. 0
- Position: Back

Personal information
- Born: July 2, 1910; Lexington, Nebraska, U.S.
- Died: September 4, 1996 (aged 86); Albuquerque, New Mexico, U.S.
- Listed height: 5 ft 6 in (1.68 m)
- Listed weight: 148 lb (67 kg)

Career information
- High school: Boise (Boise, Idaho)
- College: Idaho (1931–1933)

Career history

Playing
- New York Giants (1934); Los Angeles Bulldogs (1936)

Coaching
- Fort Warren (1943–1945) Head coach

Awards and highlights
- NFL champion (1934); Second-team All-PCC (1932)

Career statistics
- TD–INT: 1–1
- Passing yards: 37
- Passer rating: 66.2
- Rushing yards: 323
- Rushing touchdowns: 2
- Receptions: 2
- Receiving yards: 32
- Stats at Pro Football Reference

Head coaching record
- Career: 14–14–1 (.500)
- Military career
- Allegiance: United States
- Branch: United States Army
- Rank: Lieutenant Colonel
- Conflicts: World War II; Korean War; Vietnam War

Willis Merton "Wee Willie" Smith (July 2, 1910 – September 4, 1996) was an American football back who played one season with the New York Giants of the National Football League (NFL).

== High school ==
Smith first enrolled at Lexington Senior High School in Lexington, Nebraska, transferred to Sheridan High School in Sheridan, Wyoming, and then to Boise High School in Boise, Idaho, where he graduated.

== College ==
Smith played college football at the University of Idaho in Moscow under head coach Leo Calland. A three-year star at quarterback (1931–1933) in the Pacific Coast Conference, his nickname was "Little Giant" while a Vandal. Smith also played baseball, graduated in 1934 with a degree in education, and was a member of Phi Gamma Delta fraternity.

== Professional football ==
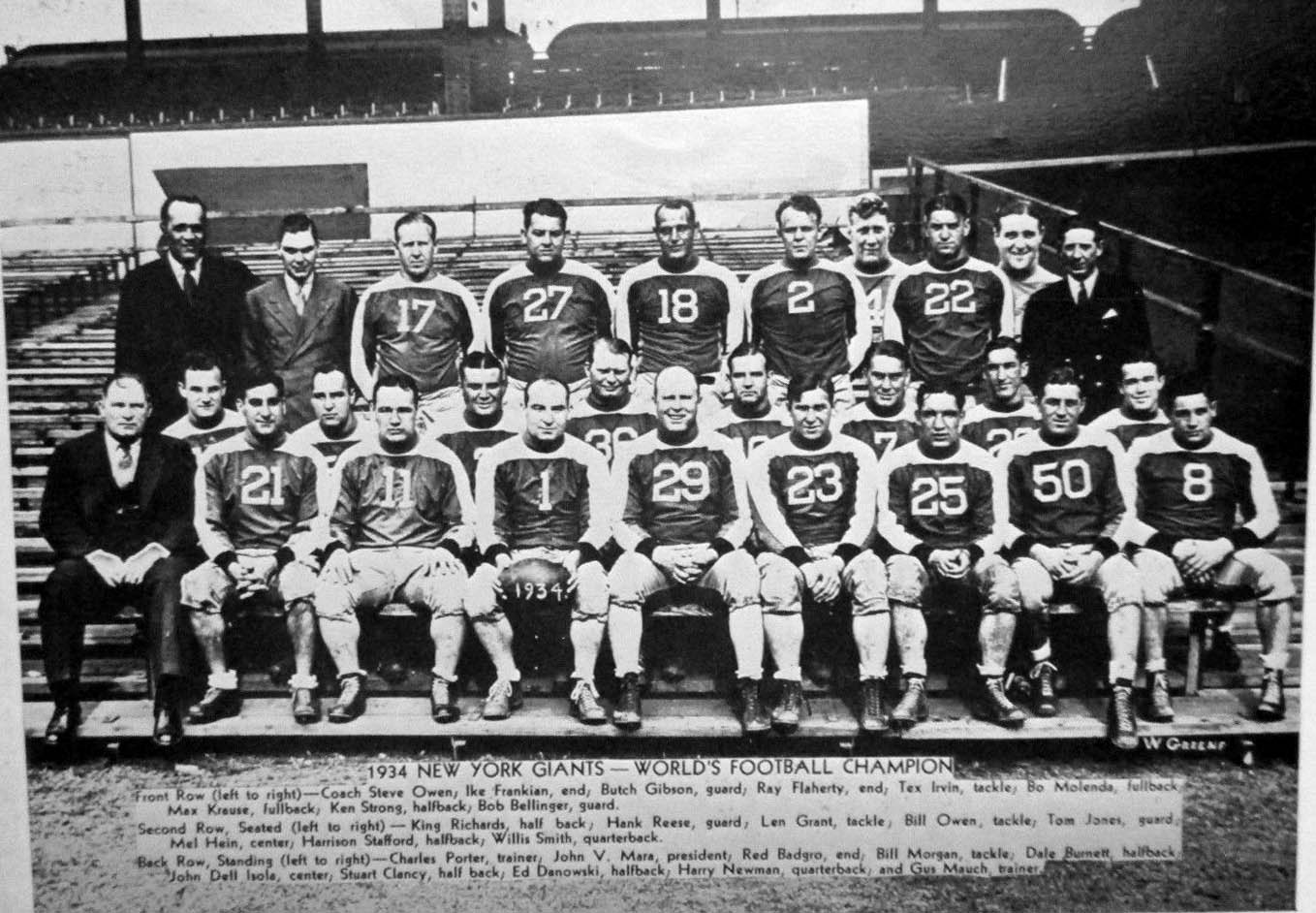
1934 New York Giants, NFL Champions; Smith is in second row at far right

Smith played in nine games in the National Football League, starting one, for the New York Giants in 1934. In the 17–7 win over Pittsburgh on October 21, Smith scored the final touchdown on a three-yard run to seal the win. The following week, he scored a late touchdown on a 24-yard run in the 17–0 win over Philadelphia.

The Giants, coached by Steve Owen, finished 8–5 in the regular season and won the Eastern Division. They met George Halas' undefeated Chicago Bears for a third time that season in the NFL championship game. The Bears had won the two regular season games in November and led 13–3 after three quarters on a frigid December 9, but the Giants scored four touchdowns in the fourth quarter to secure a 30–13 upset at the Polo Grounds for the league title, in what was later known as the "Sneakers" game. Due to his small stature, Smith wore number zero and generated a considerable amount of interest in the press.

In 1936, Smith played for the independent Los Angeles Bulldogs, who played all their games at home at Gilmore Stadium.

== After football ==
By 1937, he was out of football and back in northern Idaho, working as an area supervisor for the Works Progress Administration (WPA) in Coeur d'Alene.

He served as a training officer in the U.S. Army in World War II, and coached the football team at Fort Warren in Cheyenne, Wyoming.

== Personal life ==
Smith was blind in one eye; he died at age 86 in Albuquerque, New Mexico, and is buried at the Santa Fe National Cemetery (section 4, site 8B).

== Head coaching record ==
Year	Team	Overall	Conference	Standing	Bowl/playoffs
Fort Warren Broncos (Independent) (1943–1945)
1943	Fort Warren	4–3			
1944	Fort Warren	5–4–1			
1945	Fort Warren	5–7			
Fort Warren:		14–14–1			
Total:		14–14–1			
