= List of Pittsburgh Steelers head coaches =

The Pittsburgh Steelers franchise has had 17 head coaches throughout its history. Founded as the Pittsburgh Pirates in 1933, the name was changed to the Steelers prior to the 1940 season to celebrate the city's heritage of producing steel. Joe Bach served two separate terms as head coach and Walt Kiesling served three separate terms. During the 1943 and 1944 seasons, due to the number of players who fought in World War II, the Steelers combined their team with Philadelphia and Chicago, respectively. During these seasons, Kiesling shared coaching duties with Greasy Neale and Phil Handler, who have not been included within this list. Since the beginning of the Super Bowl era in 1970, the Steelers have had only four head coaches, the fewest of any NFL franchise.

Struggling with a losing record for much of the franchise's early years, the team's first season with more wins than losses was coached by Jock Sutherland in 1942. In 1947, under Sutherland, the Steelers played their first playoff game against the Philadelphia Eagles. Ten of the 17 head coaches spent their entire professional coaching careers with the franchise, including Kiesling, Johnny Blood, and Chuck Noll, who have also been voted into the Pro Football Hall of Fame. One of only four men to coach the same team for 23 years, Noll retired in 1991. Bill Cowher, who was Noll's replacement, coached the Steelers to their fifth Super Bowl victory in Super Bowl XL (2005) and was voted into the Hall of Fame in 2020. The Steelers' sixth Super Bowl win came in Super Bowl XLIII (2008) under head coach Mike Tomlin, who was hired to replace the retiring Cowher in 2007.

== Key ==
#	Number of coaches
GC	Games Coached
W	Wins
L	Loses
T	Ties
Win%	Winning percentage
†	Elected into the Pro Football Hall of Fame as a coach
‡	Elected into the Pro Football Hall of Fame as a player
^	Elected into the Pro Football Hall of Fame as the NFL Commissioner
*	Spent entire NFL head coaching career with the Steelers
+	Highest winning percentage in franchise history

== Coaches ==
Note: Statistics are accurate through the end of the 2025 NFL season.

#	Image	Name	Term	Regular season					Playoffs				Awards	Ref./ Notes
#	Image	Name	Term	GC	W	L	T	Win%	GC	W	L	Win%	Awards	Ref./ Notes
Pittsburgh Pirates
1		Forrest Douds*	1933*	11	3	6	2	.333	—					
2		Luby DiMeolo*	1934*	12	2	10	0	.167	—					
3		Joe Bach*	1935–1936*	24	10	14	0	.416	—					^{[a]}
4		Johnny Blood ‡*	1937–1939*	25	6	19	0	.240	—					
5		Walt Kiesling ‡*	1939–1940*	19	3	13	3	.188	—					^{[b]}
Pittsburgh Steelers
6		Bert Bell ^	1941	2	0	2	0	.000	—					
7		Aldo Donelli	1941	5	0	5	0	.000	—					
–		Walt Kiesling ‡*	1941–1944*	35	13	20	2	.394	—					^{[b]} ^{[c]}
8		Jim Leonard*	1945*	10	2	8	0	.200	—					
9		Jock Sutherland	1946–1947	23	13	9	1	.591	1	0	1	.000		
10		John Michelosen*	1948–1951*	48	20	26	2	.435	—					
–		Joe Bach*	1952–1953*	24	11	13	0	.485	—					^{[a]}
–		Walt Kiesling ‡*	1954–1956*	36	14	22	0	.389	—					^{[b]}
11		Buddy Parker	1957–1964	104	51	47	6	.520	—					
12		Mike Nixon	1965	14	2	12	0	.143	—					
13		Bill Austin	1966–1968	42	11	28	3	.282	—					
14		Chuck Noll †*	1969–1991*	342	193	148	1	.566	24	16	8	.667	UPI AFC Coach of the Year (1972); Maxwell Football Club NFL Coach of the Year (1989)	
15		Bill Cowher†*	1992–2006*	240	149	90	1	.623	21	12	9	.571	AP NFL Coach of the Year (1992); Sporting News NFL Coach of the Year (1992); Sporting News NFL Coach of the Year (2004)	
16	Mike Tomlin	Mike Tomlin+*	2007–2025	309	193	114	2	.628	20	8	12	.400	Motorola NFL Coach of the Year (2008)	
17		Mike McCarthy	2026–present	0	0	0	0	.000	—					

== Footnotes ==
- ^{a} Bach's full coaching record with the Steelers is 48 regular season games coached with a record of 21–27 and a W–L percentage of .438.
- ^{b} Kiesling's full coaching record with the Steelers is 90 regular season games coached with a record of 30–55–5 and a W–L percentage of .353.
- ^{c} In 1943 the Steelers combined with the Philadelphia Eagles to form the "Steagles", and Walt Kiesling shared the head coach position with Greasy Neale. In 1944 the Steelers combined with the Chicago Cardinals to form "Card-Pitt", and Walt Kiesling shared the head coaching position with Phil Handler.

== See also ==
- List of Pittsburgh Steelers players
