= Bob Bellinger =

American football player (1913–1955)

- Bellinger in 1934

No. 8
- Position: Guard

Personal information
- Born: January 20, 1913; Spokane, Washington, U.S.
- Died: August 27, 1955 (aged 42); Santa Clara, California, U.S.
- Listed height: 5 ft 11 in (1.80 m)
- Listed weight: 216 lb (98 kg)

Career information
- High school: Seattle (WA) Prep
- College: Gonzaga

Career history
- New York Giants (1934–1935)

Awards and highlights
- NFL champion (1934)

Career statistics
- Games played: 18
- Starts: 10
- Stats at Pro Football Reference

Robert Herkimer Bellinger (January 20, 1913 – August 27, 1955) was an American professional football guard who played two seasons with the New York Giants of the National Football League (NFL). He attended Seattle Preparatory School and played college football at Gonzaga University, both Jesuit schools.

== Early life and college ==
Bob Bellinger was born January 20, 1913, in Spokane, Washington. He attended Seattle Prep, a private Catholic high school, where he distinguished himself as a wrestler and football player, playing fullback and tackle.

He played collegiately at Gonzaga Bulldogs football, where he spent three seasons on the varsity team at the tackle position.

== Professional career ==
In 1934 and 1935, Bellinger played for the New York Giants of the National Football League (NFL), moving to the guard position. He played in a total of eighteen games over the two years, starting ten. He was a member of the Giants team which won the 1934 NFL Championship.

== Personal life ==
Bellinger died of a heart attack on August 27, 1955, in Santa Clara, California. He was the manager and vice president of the Valley Equipment Company in San Jose at the time of his death.
