= 1933 Philadelphia Eagles season =

NFL team season

- Owner: Bert Bell
- General manager: Bert Bell (de facto)
- Head coach: Lud Wray
- Home stadium: National League Park

Results
- Record: 3–5–1 (.375)
- Division place: 4th Eastern
- Playoffs: Did not qualify

The 1933 Philadelphia Eagles season was the franchise's inaugural season in the National Football League (NFL). In a year with an unbalanced schedule, the Eagles saw the field a league-low total of 9 times in 1933, finishing the season with a 3–5–1 (.375) record.

== Offseason ==
When Pennsylvania eased some of the Blue laws and allowed Sunday sporting events, Philadelphia and Pittsburgh became available for NFL franchises as they could play home games on Sundays. The Frankford Yellow Jackets played their games on Saturday mostly when at home.

During the offseason, Bert Bell and Lud Wray were granted an expansion franchise in the NFL for the rights to Philadelphia. The previous team, the Frankford Yellow Jackets, were inactive for two years so their rights were pulled by the NFL. They joined the Pittsburgh Pirates and the Cincinnati Reds, for a $2,500 entrance fee. The Eagles got their name from the Blue Eagle, which was used by American companies to symbolize their compliance with the National Industrial Recovery Act, a program within Franklin D. Roosevelt's New Deal. The NFL Eagles' original colors were a light blue and yellow matching the flag of the City of Philadelphia.

== Preseason ==
The Eagles held their first training camp at Bader Field in Atlantic City, New Jersey.

The team played its first ever game on Sunday, September 17, 1933 in a preseason matchup with the Wessington eleven in Clifton, New Jersey in front of 4,000 fans. Swede Hanson scored the loan touchdown for the Eagles; Oren Pape lead the team in rushing; and Les Maynard intercepted Wessington in the closing moments to secure the win.

They scheduled their home games to be played at the Philadelphia Phillies' National League Park in North Philadelphia. The Eagles played at the Phillies' ballpark for three seasons before moving to the newer Philadelphia Municipal Stadium in South Philadelphia at the current site of Philadelphia Sports Complex.

== Regular season ==
=== Schedule ===
| Game | Date | Opponent | Result | Record | Venue | Attendance | Recap | Sources |
|---|---|---|---|---|---|---|---|---|
| 1 | October 15 | at **New York Giants** | **L** 0–56 | 0–1 | Polo Grounds | 18,000 | Recap | |
| 2 | October 18 | **Portsmouth Spartans** | **L** 0–25 | 0–2 | Baker Bowl | 1,750 | Recap | |
| — | Bye | | | | | | | |
| 3 | October 29 | at **Green Bay Packers** | **L** 9–35 | 0–3 | City Stadium | 3,007 | Recap | |
| 4 | November 5 | at **Cincinnati Reds** | **W** 6–0 | 1–3 | Redland Field | < 500 | Recap | |
| 5 | November 12 | **Chicago Bears** | **T** 3–3 | 1–3–1 | Baker Bowl | 17,850 | Recap | |
| 6 | November 19 | **Pittsburgh Pirates** | **W** 25–6 | 2–3–1 | Baker Bowl | 6,000 | Recap | |
| 7 | November 26 | **Cincinnati Reds** | **W** 20–3 | 3–3–1 | Baker Bowl | 10,000 | Recap | |
| 8 | December 3 | **Green Bay Packers** | **L** 0–10 | 3–4–1 | Baker Bowl | 9,500 | Recap | |
| 9 | December 10 | **New York Giants** | **L** 14–20 | 3–5–1 | Baker Bowl | 8,000 | Recap | |
Note: Intra-division opponents are in **bold** text.

== Standings ==
NFL Eastern Division
| | W | L | T | PCT | DIV | PF | PA | STK |
|---|---|---|---|---|---|---|---|---|
| New York Giants | 11 | 3 | 0 | .786 | 7–1 | 244 | 101 | W7 |
| Brooklyn Dodgers | 5 | 4 | 1 | .556 | 2–2–1 | 93 | 54 | L2 |
| Boston Redskins | 5 | 5 | 2 | .500 | 2–3 | 103 | 97 | T1 |
| Philadelphia Eagles | 3 | 5 | 1 | .375 | 1–2 | 77 | 158 | L2 |
| Pittsburgh Pirates | 3 | 6 | 2 | .333 | 1–5–1 | 67 | 208 | L3 |

Note: Tie games were not officially counted in the standings until 1972.

== Roster ==
1933 Philadelphia Eagles roster
| **Backs**: Red Davis TB; Red Kirkman BB; Harry O'Boyle; Nick Prisco TB; Reb Russell; Dick Thornton; Lee Woodruff; **Quarterbacks**: Porter Lainhart; **Halfbacks**: Rick Lackman; Jack Roberts | **Fullbacks**: Swede Hanson; Jodie Whire; **Ends**: Joe Carter; Nip Felber; Dick Fencl; George Kenneally; Ev Rowan | **Guards**: Joe Kresky; Milton Leathers; Roy Lechthaler; Henry Obst; Diddie Willson; Jim Zyntell; **Tackles**: Howie Auer; Joe Carpe; Paul Cuba; Bob Gonya; Tex Leyendecker; Larry Steinbach; Guy Turnbow; **Centers**: Art Koeninger; John Lipski; Dick Smith; Ray Smith | **Head coach**: Lud Wray; Rookies in italics (21); 34 Active, 0 Inactive |
