= Edward Thorpe =

Edward Thorp(e) may refer to:

- Edward Thorpe (chemist) (1845–1925), Thomas Edward Thorpe, British chemist
- Edward O. Thorp (born 1932), American mathematician & entrepreneur

== See also ==
- Eddie Thorpe, character played by Greg Finley
- Ed Thorp Memorial Trophy
- Ted Thorpe (disambiguation)
- Eddy Thorpe, current ring name of the American professional wrestler Karl Fredericks
