= Ted Thorpe =

Ted Thorpe may refer to:

- Ted Thorpe (footballer, born 1898), Edwin Thorpe
- Ted Thorpe (footballer, born 1910), Albert Edward Thorpe

== See also ==
- Edward Thorpe (disambiguation)
