= Thorpe Trophy =

Thorpe or Thorp Trophy may refer to:

- Ed Thorp Memorial Trophy, trophy awarded to the National Football League (NFL) champions from 1934 through 1967
- Jim Thorpe Trophy, NFL most valuable player award from 1955 to 2008
- Jim Thorpe Award, college football award for the top defensive back
