= Diddie =

Diddie is a nickname. Notable people with the nickname include:

- Diddie Vlasto (1903–1985), French tennis player
- Diddie Willson (1911–1961), American football player
