= 1934 Boston Redskins season =

NFL team season

- Owner: George Preston Marshall
- General manager: Dennis J. Shea
- Head coach: Lone Star Dietz
- Home stadium: Fenway Park

Results
- Record: 6–6-0
- Division place: 2nd NFL Eastern
- Playoffs: Did not qualify

Media guide for the team

The 1934 Boston Redskins season was the franchise's 3rd season in the National Football League . The team finished with a record of six wins and six losses and finished in second place in the Eastern Division of the National Football League. They failed to qualify for the playoffs for the third consecutive season.

== Regular season ==
=== Schedule ===
Week	Date	Opponent	Result	Record	Venue
1	Bye				
2	September 16	at **Pittsburgh Pirates**	**W** 7–0	1–0	Forbes Field
3	Bye				
4	September 30	at **Brooklyn Dodgers**	**L** 6–10	1–1	Ebbets Field
5	October 7	**New York Giants**	**L** 13–16	1–2	Fenway Park
6	October 14	**Pittsburgh Pirates**	**W** 39–0	2–2	Fenway Park
6	October 17	at Detroit Lions	**L** 0–24	2–3	University of Detroit Stadium
7	October 21	**Philadelphia Eagles**	**W** 6–0	3–3	Fenway Park
8	October 28	Chicago Cardinals	**W** 9–0	4–3	Fenway Park
9	November 4	Green Bay Packers	**L** 0–10	4–4	Fenway Park
10	November 11	Chicago Bears	**L** 0–21	4–5	Fenway Park
11	November 18	at **Philadelphia Eagles**	**W** 14–7	5–5	Baker Bowl
12	November 25	at **New York Giants**	**L** 0–3	5–6	Polo Grounds
13	December 2	**Brooklyn Dodgers**	**W** 13–3	6–6	Fenway Park
Note: Intra-division opponents are in **bold** text.

== Roster ==
1934 Boston Redskins final roster
Backs: 20 Cliff Battles RB/CB/K; 26 Steve Hokuf RB/S; 14 Hal McPhail FB/LB; 11 Erny Pinckert RB/CB/S; 31 Pug Rentner RB/CB; 12 Ted Wright RB/CB/K; 25 Doug Wycoff FB/LB/K	Linemen: 24 Frank Bausch C/MG; 24 Ben Boswell T/DT; 28 Rick Concannon G/DG; 23 Orien Crow C/MG; 17 Turk Edwards T/DT; 37 Marne Intrieri G/DG; 22 Gail O'Brien G/DG/T/DT; 21 Les Olsson G/DG; 34 Steve Sinko T/DT; 29 Frank Walton G/DG	Ends/Receivers: 32 Paul Collins; 16 Larry Johnson; 19 Charley Malone; 30 Flavio Tosi; rookies in italics

== Standings ==
NFL Eastern Division
	W	L	T	PCT	DIV	PF	PA	STK
New York Giants	8	5	0	.615	7–1	147	107	L1
Boston Redskins	6	6	0	.500	5–3	107	94	W1
Brooklyn Dodgers	4	7	0	.364	4–4	61	153	L3
Philadelphia Eagles	4	7	0	.364	3–5	127	85	W2
Pittsburgh Pirates	2	10	0	.167	1–7	51	206	L7

Note: Tie games were not officially counted in the standings until 1972.
