= Ed Matesic =

American football player (1907–1988)

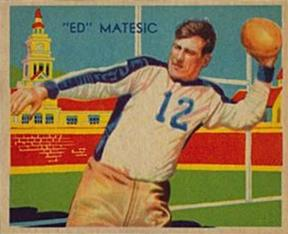

No. 12, 47
- Positions: Halfback, quarterback

Personal information
- Born: November 6, 1907; Marshall County, West Virginia, U.S.
- Died: June 4, 1988 (aged 80); Wheeling, West Virginia, U.S.
- Listed height: 6 ft 1 in (1.85 m)
- Listed weight: 198 lb (90 kg)

Career information
- High school: Benwood High School
- College: Pittsburgh

Career history
- (1934–1935): Philadelphia Eagles
- (1936): Pittsburgh Pirates

Career NFL statistics
- Passing yards: 1,412
- Passing attempts: 262
- TD–INT: 8–34
- Passing completions: 99
- Rushing yards: 377

Edward J. Matesic (November 6, 1907 – June 4, 1988) was an American professional football player for the Philadelphia Eagles and the Pittsburgh Pirates. He led the University of Pittsburgh in interceptions in 1931. In 1931 only the statistics of yards and touchdowns were recorded and not the number of interceptions. In 1931 Ed had 91 yards and one touchdown on interceptions.

Matesic then played HB/TB in the pros. He was the Pittsburgh Pirates (later the Steelers) starting quarterback in 1936, finishing second in the NFL with 850 yards passing.

In his pro career, Matesic threw for 1,412 yards and 8 touchdowns, ran for 377 yards and 1 touchdown, and caught 4 passes for 51 yards and one touchdown.
