= Frank Hood =

American football player (1908–1955)

No. 45
- Position: Halfback

Personal information
- Born: July 18, 1903; Monaca, Pennsylvania, U.S.
- Died: August 21, 1955 (aged 52); Monaca, Pennsylvania, U.S.
- Listed height: 6 ft 0 in (1.83 m)
- Listed weight: 235 lb (107 kg)

Career information
- High school: Bellefonte (Bellefonte, Pennsylvania)
- College: Pittsburgh (1927–1930)

Career history
- Pittsburgh Pirates (1933)
- Stats at Pro Football Reference

James Franklin Hood (July 18, 1903 – August 21, 1955) was an American professional football halfback who played one season in the National Football League (NFL) with the Pittsburgh Pirates. He played college football at the University of Pittsburgh.

== Early life ==
James Franklin Hood was born on July 18, 1903, in Monaca, Pennsylvania. He first played high school football at Monaca High School in Monaca from 1922 to 1923. During his time with Monaca, they outscored opponents by 350 to 51 with Franklin scoring 192 points on 22 touchdowns. He then played three years at Bellefonte Academy in Bellefonte, Pennsylvania. Bellefonte outscored opponents by 1,159 to 41 during Hood's time there. He led Bellefonte to the national prep title in 1925. Hood was inducted into the Beaver County Sports Hall of Fame in 1980.

== College career ==
Hood was a member of the Pittsburgh Panthers of the University of Pittsburgh from 1927 to 1930. His college career was hampered by knee and hand injuries. He earned honorable mention All-American honors in 1930.

== Professional career ==
Hood played semipro football for the J.P. Rooneys from 1931 to 1932.

He later signed with the Pittsburgh Pirates of the National Football League on October 19, 1933. He played in three games, starting one, for the Pirates during the team's inaugural 1933 season, completing six of 18 passes for 45 yards and four interceptions while also rushing once for one yard. He wore jersey number 45 while with the Pirates. Hood was released on November 13, 1933.

== Personal life ==
Hood died on August 21, 1955, in Monaca.
