= Silvio Zaninelli =

American football player (1913–1979)

No. 33, 22
- Positions: Running back, fullback

Personal information
- Born: December 9, 1913; Reading, Pennsylvania, U.S.
- Died: January 29, 1979 (aged 65); Weirton, West Virginia, U.S.
- Listed height: 5 ft 10 in (1.78 m)
- Listed weight: 207 lb (94 kg)

Career information
- High school: Avella (PA)
- College: Duquesne

Career history
- Pittsburgh Pirates (1934–1937)

Career statistics
- Games played: 44
- Rush attempts: 81
- Rushing yards: 150
- Rushing touchdowns: 1
- Receptions: 7
- Receiving yards: 45
- Games started: 25
- Stats at Pro Football Reference

Silvio David Zaninelli (December 9, 1913 – January 29, 1979) was an American football running back and fullback who played four seasons for the Pittsburgh Pirates of the National Football League (NFL). In his career, he scored one touchdown on 81 rushing attempts. He played a total of 44 games, being a starter in 25 of them. Zaninelli played college football at Duquesne.
