= Bill Snyder (American football, born 1911) =

American football player (1911–)

- Snyder, circa 1938

No. 25, 34
- Positions: Guard, tackle

Personal information
- Born: October 29, 1911; London, Ohio, U.S.
- Died: October 29, 1973 (aged 62); Dayton, Ohio, U.S.
- Listed height: 6 ft 2 in (1.88 m)
- Listed weight: 230 lb (104 kg)

Career information
- High school: London
- College: Ohio

Career history
- Boston Redskins (1934)*; Pittsburgh Pirates (1934–1935); Dayton Rosies (1936–1938); Dayton Bombers (1939)
- * Offseason or practice squad member only
- Stats at Pro Football Reference

William Howard Snyder (October 29, 1911 – October 29, 1973) was an American professional football player for the Pittsburgh Pirates of the National Football League (NFL). He played college football for the Ohio Bobcats.

== Early life ==
William Howard Snyder was born on October 29, 1911, in London, Ohio. He attended London High School.

== College career ==
Snyder enrolled at Ohio University to play college football for the Bobcats. He was on the freshmen team in 1930 and a "star" tackle on the varsity team from 1931 to 1933. He earned all-state honors each year he was on the varsity team. Snyder was also a team captain his senior year.

== Professional career ==
In February 1934, Snyder signed with the Boston Redskins of the National Football League (NFL). He was released before the start of the season and signed by the Pittsburgh Pirates. He missed some time in October with a leg infection. His doctor said "The boy told me he'd been sick a couple of days and that he didn't want to report his illness lest his buddies think he was ducking a tough game. When he returned to his hotel he collapsed. Now he'll be out of action for several weeks." Snyder played in five games for the Pirates during the 1934 season as a guard/tackle. He appeared in seven games, starting three, in 1935 at guard.

Snyder played for the Dayton Rosies of the Midwest Football League from 1936 to 1938. He played in all six league games, starting five, for the Rosies during the 1936 season. In December 1936, he was described as the team's "outstanding lineman all season". Snyder appeared in all eight games, starting five, in 1937 as a tackle, guard, and center. The Dayton Herald called him the team's "mainspring" during the 1937 season. He played in five games, starting one, for the Rosies in 1938 at tackle.

Snyder played in all seven league games, starting four, for the Dayton Bombers of the American Professional Football Association in 1939.

== Personal life ==
Snyder died on October 29, 1973, in Dayton, Ohio
