= Lud Wray =

American football player, coach, team owner

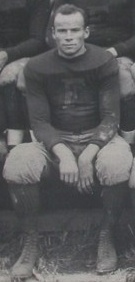
- Wray as a member of the Frankford Athletic Association Yellow Jackets in 1922

Profile
- Position: Center

Personal information
- Born: February 7, 1894; Philadelphia, Pennsylvania, U.S.
- Died: July 24, 1967 (aged 73); Philadelphia, Pennsylvania, U.S.
- Listed height: 6 ft 0 in (1.83 m)
- Listed weight: 180 lb (82 kg)

Career information
- High school: Chestnut Hill (PA)
- College: Penn

Career history

Playing
- Buffalo Niagaras (1918); Buffalo Prospects (1919); Union Club of Phoenixville (1920); Union Quakers of Philadelphia (1921); Buffalo All-Americans (1920–1921); Frankford Yellow Jackets (1922)

Coaching
- Penn (1923–1929) Assistant coach; Penn (1930) Head coach; Boston Braves (1932) Head coach; Philadelphia Eagles (1933–1935) Head coach; Manhattan (1938–1940) Assistant coach; St. Joseph's Prep (PA) (1941) Assistant coach; Holy Cross (1942–1943) Assistant coach; Pittsburgh Steelers (1945) Assistant coach

Head coaching record
- Regular season: 13-25-3 (.342) (NFL); 5–4 (.556) (College)
- Coaching profile at Pro Football Reference
- Stats at Pro Football Reference

James R. Ludlow Wray (February 7, 1894 – July 24, 1967) was an American professional football player, coach, and co-founder, with college teammate Bert Bell, of the Philadelphia Eagles of the National Football League (NFL). He was the first coach of the Boston Braves (now the Washington Commanders) and of the Eagles.

He also served as head coach at his alma mater, the University of Pennsylvania.

== Playing career ==
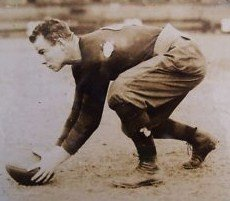
Wray as a member of the Buffalo All-Americans in 1921.

Wray attended Chestnut Hill Academy in Philadelphia, where he lettered in baseball and football. He played his college football at the University of Pennsylvania, was the Quakers' center from 1914 to 1916.

During World War I, Wray served in the United States Marine Corps. He returned for his senior season in 1919. In additional to football, Wray also played catcher on the Penn baseball team.

Professionally, Wray played for the Buffalo Niagaras, Buffalo Prospects, and Buffalo All-Americans from 1918 until 1921. In 1920 and 1921, Buffalo was a member of the National Football League (then called the American Professional Football Association).

== Coaching career ==
=== Penn ===
From 1923 to 1929, Wray served as an assistant football coach at Penn. In 1930, he succeeded Lou Young as head coach. He was fired on December 12, 1930, due to friction with players, alumni, and the public.

=== Boston Braves ===
In 1932, Wray was named head coach of the Boston Braves, a National Football League expansion team. The Braves went 4–4–2 in their inaugural season. He left the team after one season and was replaced by Lone Star Dietz.

=== Philadelphia Eagles ===
In 1933, Wray's former teammate and fellow assistant at Penn, Bert Bell convinced him to become coach of the expansion Philadelphia Eagles. By 1936, the club was suffering significant financial losses and was offered for sale at a public auction. Bell was the only bidder and became the team's sole owner. On April 28, Wray refused a 66% reduction in salary and left the team.

=== Later career ===
In 1938, Wray became an assistant at Manhattan College. He remained with the school until his resignation in November 1940.

In 1941, Wray served as an assistant to Ank Scanlan at St. Joseph's Preparatory School in Philadelphia. When Scanlan became head coach at Holy Cross, Wray followed him. In 1943, Scanlan's war commitments limited him to only being able to coach on game day and Wray led the team the rest of the week. Wray and Scanlan had a falling out and Wray was replaced by Ox DaGrosa for 1944.

Wray served as an assistant coach under Jim Leonard for the Pittsburgh Steelers in 1945.

== Personal life and death ==
On December 26, 1933, Wray married Juanita Sauveur. After Juanita's death in 1950, Wray married the former Frances Cressman. He died on July 25, 1967, in Philadelphia. At the time of his death, Wray resided in Oreland, Pennsylvania. He was survived by his second wife.

== Popular culture ==
Wray's contribution to the founding of the Eagles was referenced by Jane Lynch in an October 9, 2010, Saturday Night Live skit.

== Head coaching record ==
=== College ===
Year	Team	Overall	Conference	Standing	Bowl/playoffs
Penn Quakers (Independent) (1930)
1930	Penn	5–4			
Penn:		5–4			
Total:		5–4–1			

=== NFL ===
Team	Year	Regular season					Postseason			
Team	Year	Won	Lost	Ties	Win %	Finish	Won	Lost	Win %	Result
BOS	1932	4	4	2	.500	4th in NFL	–	–	–	–
BOS Total		4	4	2	.500		–	–	–	
PHI	1933	3	5	1	.375	4th in NFL East	–	–	–	–
PHI	1934	4	7	0	.364	T–3rd in NFL East	–	–	–	–
PHI	1935	2	9	0	.182	5th in NFL East	–	–	–	–
PHI Total		9	21	1	.306		–	–	–	
Total		13	25	3	.342		–	–	–	
