= Zvonimir Kvaternik =

American football player (1918–1994)

No. 19
- Position: Guard

Personal information
- Born: October 18, 1918; Kansas City, Kansas, U.S.
- Died: October 19, 1994 (aged 76); Shawnee Mission, Kansas, U.S.
- Listed height: 5 ft 11 in (1.80 m)
- Listed weight: 210 lb (95 kg)

Career information
- College: Kansas

Career history
- Pittsburgh Steelers (1934)

Career statistics
- Games played: 1
- Fumble recoveries: 1
- Stats at Pro Football Reference

Zvonimir Kvaternik (October 18, 1918 – October 19, 1994) was an American football guard who played one season for the Pittsburgh Steelers of the National Football League (NFL) in 1934. He played college football at the University of Kansas.

Kavernik later operated a remodeling company called Creative Kitchens.
