= Syl Saumer =

American football player (1910–1983)

- Saumer, circa 1930

No. 36, 8
- Position: Back

Personal information
- Born: April 30, 1910; Saint Paul, Minnesota, U.S.
- Died: January 1, 1983 (aged 72); Reno, Nevada, U.S.
- Listed height: 6 ft 1 in (1.85 m)
- Listed weight: 195 lb (88 kg)

Career information
- High school: Canby (Canby, Minnesota)
- College: St. Olaf

Career history
- Boston Redskins (1934); Pittsburgh Pirates (1934); St. Louis Gunners (1934); Cincinnati Reds (1934); St. Louis Gunners (1934); Pittsburgh Pirates (1934); Chicago Bears (1936)*; Brooklyn Dodgers (1936)*
- * Offseason or practice squad member only
- Stats at Pro Football Reference

Sylvan Leon "Pete" Saumer (April 30, 1910 – January 1, 1983) was an American professional football back who played in the National Football League (NFL) with the Pittsburgh Pirates and Cincinnati Reds. He played college football for the St. Olaf Oles. He scored the Reds' only touchdown in 1934.

== Early life ==
Sylvan Leon Saumer was born on April 30, 1910, in Saint Paul, Minnesota. He attended Canby High School in Canby, Minnesota, graduating in 1928. He was inducted into the Montevideo Public Schools athletics hall of fame in 1992.

== College career ==
Saumer enrolled at St. Olaf College to play college football for the Oles. In 1929, he set a new Minnesota scoring record with 75 points. He topped the record in 1930 with 78 points. Saumer was elected a team captain for the 1931 season. In 1933, it was reported that he was not sure if he would continue playing for the Oles due to financial difficulties. However, he ended up playing for the team that year.

== Professional career ==
Saumer signed with the Boston Redskins of the National Football League (NFL) in February 1934. In March 1934, it was reported that he was not eligible to run track for the Oles that spring and that he had dropped out of school.

On September 11, 1934, the Pittsburgh Pirates purchased Saumer from the Redskins. He played in two games for the Pirates in a reserve role, rushing three times for one yard. He was released on September 27, 1934.

On October 10, 1934, Saumer joined the independent St. Louis Gunners. However, he did not play in any games for the Gunners and signed with the Cincinnati Reds on October 16, 1934. He played in three games, starting two, for the Reds in 1934, totaling 48 carries for 183 yards and one touchdown, one reception for six yards, and one completion on four passing attempts for nine yards. Saumer led the Reds in rushing yards in 1934 with 183 and scored their only touchdown all season. In November 1934, the 0–8 Reds were sold to St. Louis, becoming the St. Louis Gunners.

On November 14, 1934, it was reported that the Pirates had purchased Saumer from the Gunners. He appeared in the final league game for the Pirates in 1934 (on November 18), rushing four times for 20 yards while also throwing three incomplete passes for one interception.

Saumer signed with the Chicago Bears in 1936. He reported to the team for training camp in August 1936. By September 11, he had joined the Brooklyn Dodgers, who released him on September 15, 1936, during the preseason.

== Personal life ==
Saumer died on January 1, 1983, in Reno, Nevada.
