= 1934 NFL Championship Game =

1934 American football championship game

Coordinates: 40.831°N 73.937°W

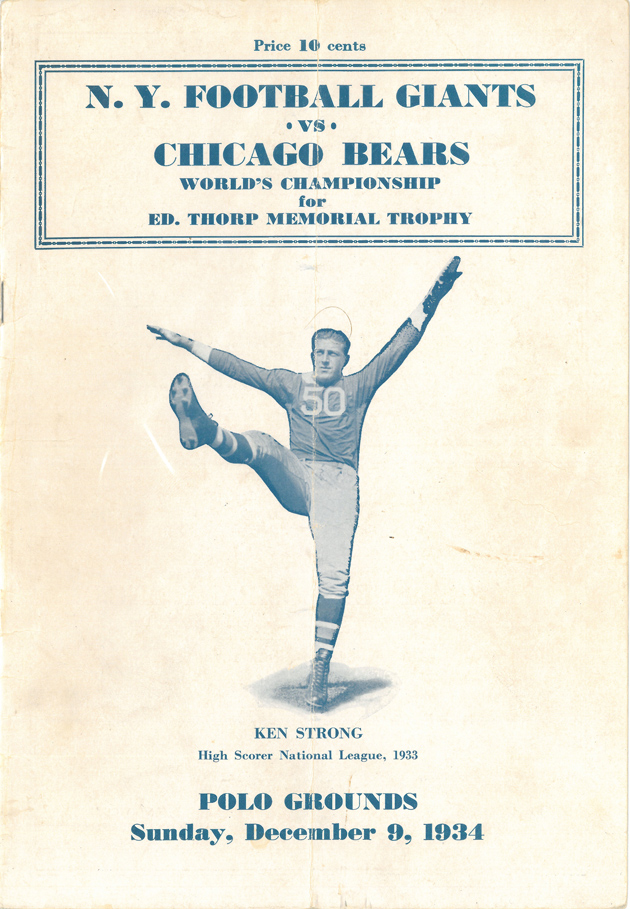
| Chicago Bears (Western) (13–0) | New York Giants (Eastern) (8–5) |
|---|---|
| 13 | 30 |
| Head coach: George Halas | Head coach: Steve Owen |
| | 1 | 2 | 3 | 4 | Total |
|---|---|---|---|---|---|
| CHI | 0 | 10 | 3 | 0 | 13 |
| NYG | 3 | 0 | 0 | 27 | 30 |
- Date: December 9, 1934
- Stadium: Polo Grounds; Manhattan, New York
- Attendance: 35,059

The 1934 NFL Championship Playoff, popularly remembered as "The Sneakers Game", was the second scheduled National Football League (NFL) championship game. Played at the Polo Grounds in New York City on December 9, it was the first title game for the newly created Ed Thorp Memorial Trophy. With a remarkable fourth quarter, the New York Giants defeated the Chicago Bears 30–13, winning their second championship in team history and denying the Bears a three-peat.

== Game summary ==
The defending champion Bears entered the game undefeated at 13–0, with an 18-game winning streak. The Giants (8–5) won consecutive division titles, but had lost their final regular season game at Philadelphia. The Bears were favored to repeat as champions.

A freezing rain the night before the game froze the Polo Grounds field. After Giants end Ray Flaherty remarked to head coach Steve Owen that sneakers would provide better footing on the frozen playing surface, Owen sent his friend Abe Cohen, a tailor who assisted on the Giants sideline, to Manhattan College to get some sneakers.

The Bears led 10–3 at the half when the Giants switched to the basketball sneakers. A Chicago field goal was the only score in the third quarter, extending the lead to ten points. Early in the fourth, Giants quarterback Ed Danowski threw a touchdown pass to Ike Frankian to close the score to 13–10. (The pass was momentarily intercepted at the Bears' 2-yard line, but Frankian was there to snatch the ball out of the defender's hands.) On the next New York drive, running back Ken Strong scored on a 42-yard touchdown run. Later Strong had another touchdown run. The Giants scored for a final time on Danowski's 9-yard run, a fourth unanswered touchdown. New York scored 27 points in the 4th quarter and won 30–13. The Giants 27 fourth quarter points in a championship game set an NFL record that still stands today.

Bears fullback Bronko Nagurski being dragged down by Bo Molenda and Mel Hein of the Giants.

== Scoring summary ==
Chicago Bears 23, New York Giants 21

| Quarter | 1 | 2 | 3 | 4 | Total |
|---|---|---|---|---|---|
| Bears | 0 | 10 | 3 | 0 | 13 |
| Giants | 3 | 0 | 0 | 27 | 30 |

at Polo Grounds, Manhattan, New York

- Date: Sunday, December 9, 1934
- Game time: 2:00 p.m. EST
- Pro-Football-Reference.com

Game information

Scoring

- First quarter
  - NYG – Ken Strong 38-yard field goal. Giants 3–0
- Second quarter
  - CHI – Bronko Nagurski 1-yard run (Jack Manders kick). Bears 7–3
  - CHI – Jack Manders 17-yard field goal. Bears 10–3
- Third quarter
  - CHI – Jack Manders 22-yard field goal. Bears 13–3
- Fourth quarter
  - NYG – Ike Frankian 28-yard pass from Ed Danowski (Strong kick). Bears 13–10
  - NYG – Ken Strong 42-yard run (Strong kick). Giants 17–13
  - NYG – Ken Strong 11-yard run (kick failed). Giants 23–13
  - NYG – Ed Danowski 9-yard run (Bo Molenda kick). Giants 30–13

Top passers

- CHI – Keith Molesworth – 4/9, 60 yards, 1 INT
- NYG – Ed Danowski – 6/11, 83 yards, 1 TD, 2 INT

Top rushers

- CHI – Bronko Nagurski – 24 rushes, 68 yards, 1 TD
- NYG – Ken Strong – 9 rushes, 94 yards, 2 TD

Top receivers

- CHI – Bill Hewitt - 2 receptions, 30 yards
- NYG– Dale Burnett - 2 receptions, 30 yards

== Officials ==
- Referee: Bobby Cahn
- Umpire: George Lowe
- Head linesman: George Vergara
- Field judge: M.J. Meyer

The NFL had only four game officials in 1934; the back judge was added in 1947, the line judge in 1965, and the side judge in 1978.

== Players' shares ==
The projected attendance of 55,000 was not reached, as the week's weather kept it under 36,000. Each player on the winning Giants team received $621 (equivalent to $14,900 in 2025), while the Bears received $414 (equivalent to $10,000 in 2025) each.

== Aftermath ==
This was the Giants second NFL championship, and the first time they won a championship game. After the game, Abe Cohen promptly returned the sneakers to Manhattan College so the basketball team could practice the next day.

Many of the participants have been interviewed since the game took place, most notably Bronko Nagurski of the Bears and Mel Hein of the Giants. Generally, players from both sides have attributed the Giants' second-half dominance to their selection of footwear. As Nagurski put it later, "We immediately said something was wrong because they suddenly had good footing and we didn't...they just out-smarted us." A mini-documentary of the game, narrated by Pat Summerall, can be seen in the 1987 video "Giants Among Men." NFL Films named the game the #8 bad weather game of all time, and in 2019, it was named the 62nd greatest game in NFL history.

22 years later, in the 1956 NFL Championship Game, the Giants employed the same tactic they used against the Bears, this time wearing sneakers throughout the entire game on a frozen Yankees Stadium. The Giants would win that game 47–7.

This wouldn't be the last time that the Giants handed an undefeated team their only loss of the season in the championship game, as 73 seasons later, with the 2007 New England Patriots pursuing an unprecedented 19–0 record, New York upset them 17–14 in dramatic fashion in Super Bowl XLII.

== See also ==
- 1934 NFL season
- History of the NFL championship
- Bears–Giants rivalry
