= 1934 Brooklyn Dodgers (NFL) season =

National Football League team season

1934 Brooklyn Dodgers season
- Owner: Dan Topping and John Simms Kelly
- Head coach: Cap McEwan
- Home stadium: Ebbets Field

Results
- Record: 4–7-0
- Division place: 3rd NFL Eastern
- Playoffs: Did not qualify

The 1934 Brooklyn Dodgers season was their fifth in the league. The team failed to improve on their previous season's output of 5–4–1, winning only four games. They failed to qualify for the playoffs for the third consecutive season.

== Schedule ==
Week	Date	Opponent	Result	Record	Venue
1	Bye				
2	Bye				
3	Bye				
4	September 30	**Boston Redskins**	**W** 10–6	1–0	Ebbets Field
5	October 7	Chicago Bears	**L** 7–21	1–1	Ebbets Field
6	October 14	at **New York Giants**	**L** 0–14	1–2	Polo Grounds
7	October 21	at Detroit Lions	**L** 0–28	1–3	University of Detroit Stadium
8	October 28	**Pittsburgh Pirates**	**W** 21–3	2–3	Ebbets Field
9	November 6	Chicago Cardinals	**L** 0–21	2–4	Ebbets Field
10	November 11	at **Philadelphia Eagles**	**W** 10–7	3–4	Baker Bowl
11	November 18	at **Pittsburgh Pirates**	**W** 10–0	4–4	Forbes Field
12	November 25	**Philadelphia Eagles**	**L** 0–13	4–5	Ebbets Field
13	November 29	**New York Giants**	**L** 0–27	4–6	Ebbets Field
13	December 2	at **Boston Redskins**	**L** 3–13	4–7	Fenway Park
Note: Intra-division opponents are in **bold** text.

== Roster ==
1934 Brooklyn Dodgers final roster
**Backs**: 12 Chris Cagle RB/CB/S; 26 Benny Friedman RB/S; 88 Jack Grossman RB/CB/S; 66 Bull Karcis FB/LB; 44 Shipwreck Kelly RB/S; 22 Ralph Kercheval RB/CB/K; 33 Cliff Montgomery RB/S; 99 Dick Nesbitt FB/LB; 77 Ollie Sansen RB/CB/S; 55 Stumpy Thomason FB/LB	**Linemen**: 5 Jim Bowdoin G/DG; 2 Harold Ely T/DT; 1 Herman Hickman G/DG; 8 Bruce Jones G/T/DG/DT; 7 Lou Lubratovich T/DT; 3 Doc Morrison C/MG; 30 Tony Siano C/MG; 4 Stu Worden G/DG	**Ends/Receivers**: 50 Wayland Becker; 6 Henry Cronkite; 15 Harry Kloppenburg; 20 Paul Riblett; Rookies in italics

== Standings ==
NFL Eastern Division
	W	L	T	PCT	DIV	PF	PA	STK
New York Giants	8	5	0	.615	7–1	147	107	L1
Boston Redskins	6	6	0	.500	5–3	107	94	W1
Brooklyn Dodgers	4	7	0	.364	4–4	61	153	L3
Philadelphia Eagles	4	7	0	.364	3–5	127	85	W2
Pittsburgh Pirates	2	10	0	.167	1–7	51	206	L7

Note: Tie games were not officially counted in the standings until 1972.
