= Guy Turnbow =

American football player (1908–1975)

No. 33, 28
- Position: Tackle

Personal information
- Born: March 28, 1908; Brookhaven, Mississippi, U.S.
- Died: October 4, 1975 (aged 67); Oxford, Mississippi, U.S.
- Listed height: 6 ft 2 in (1.88 m)
- Listed weight: 217 lb (98 kg)

Career information
- High school: Brookhaven (Mississippi)
- College: Mississippi (1929–1932)

Career history
- Philadelphia Eagles (1933–1934)
- Stats at Pro Football Reference

Guy Nicholson Turnbow (March 28, 1908 – October 4, 1975) was an American professional football tackle who played two seasons with the Philadelphia Eagles of the National Football League (NFL). He played college football at the University of Mississippi.

== Early life and college ==
Guy Nicholson Turnbow was born on March 28, 1908, in Brookhaven, Mississippi. He attended Brookhaven High School in Brookhaven.

Turnbow was a member of the Ole Miss Rebels of the University of Mississippi from 1929 to 1932 and a three-year letterman from 1930 to 1932. After his senior season, he kicked the game-winning extra point in the 1932 North–South Shrine Game as the South beat the North by a score of 7–6.

== Professional career ==
Turnbow signed with the Philadelphia Eagles of the National Football League in 1933. He played in all nine games, starting seven, for the Eagles during the 1933 season. He scored a field goal in a 3–3 tie against the Chicago Bears on November 12, 1933. The Eagles finished the year with a 3–5–1 record. On September 23, 1934, Turnbow pulled a knee tendon in an exhibition game against the Fort Atkinson Blackhawks that caused him to miss two weeks. He appeared in two regular season games in 1934. On October 24, 1934, Eagles head coach Lud Wray announced that Turnbow and John Norby had been released. The Courier-Post, in reporting on Turnbow's release, speculated that his play had diminished from the previous season due to his prior knee tendon injury.

== Personal life ==
Turnbow died on October 4, 1975, in Oxford, Mississippi.
