= Barnes Milam =

American football player (1906–1979)

- Milam, c. 1953

No. 30
- Positions: Tackle, guard

Personal information
- Born: January 4, 1906; Hagerman, Texas, U.S.
- Died: December 18, 1979 (aged 73); Austin, Texas, U.S.
- Listed height: 6 ft 2 in (1.88 m)
- Listed weight: 190 lb (86 kg)

Career information
- High school: Sherman (TX); Denison (TX)
- College: Austin (1926–1929)

Career history

Playing
- Philadelphia Eagles (1934)

Coaching
- Sulphur Springs High School (1930–1932) Head coach; Austin (1933) Assistant line coach; Howe High School (1935) Head coach; Lewisville High School (1936) Head coach; Richardson High School (1937–1941) Head coach; Orange High School (1942–1945) Assistant coach (1942) Head coach (1943–1945); Midland High School (1946–1948) Head coach; Austin High School "B" Team (1949–1952) Head coach; Travis High School (1953–1954) Head coach

Operations
- Orange High School (1943–1945) Athletic director; Midland High School (1946–1948) Athletic director

Career statistics
- Games played: 2
- Stats at Pro Football Reference

Israel Barnes "Foots" Milam (January 4, 1906 – December 18, 1979) was an American football player and coach. A guard and tackle, he played one season in the National Football League (NFL) for the Philadelphia Eagles, appearing in two games. He later coached and served as athletic director at several high schools in Texas. After retiring from coaching in 1955, he served through 1971 in high school administrative positions.

== Early life and education ==
Milam was born on January 4, 1906, in Hagerman, Texas. He played football at Denison High School and also attended Sherman High School. While at Denison, he was team captain, playing the tackle position. Milam attended Austin College from 1926 to 1929 and played for their football team in his final two years with the school. He was twice named All-Texas Conference and was co-team captain as a senior.

== Coaching and professional career ==
After graduating from Austin in 1930, Milam became the head football coach at Sulphur Springs High School. He was the first coach to lead them to an undefeated season. After three seasons there, he returned to his alma mater, Austin College, to finish his master's degree and become the assistant line coach. Milam was replaced at Austin College in 1934 after the school hired a new football coach.

After being replaced at Austin, Milam, jobless, was convinced by a friend to try out for the Philadelphia Eagles of the National Football League (NFL). He joined the team in August and received a contract worth $75 per game. Milam later recalled his professional experience in an interview with the Austin American-Statesman: "Never forget it. I was out of a job and they offered me $75 a game to play with the Eagles. Everyone wasn't eating regular back in those days and it looked like awful big money to me. It was, too." He appeared in a total of two games with the team, both as a backup, as the team finished with a record of 4–7.

After the Eagles' season ended, Milam returned to Texas and began teaching at Howe High School. In 1935, he helped form their football team and served as its first head coach. He created their playbook and led them to a 6–4 record in his first and only season. In their first game, they lost 12–0 to Tioga High School, the eventual district champions. At the end of the season, they scheduled an exhibition rematch against Tioga and won 38–0.

After a season at Lewisville High School in 1936, Milam became the head coach at Richardson High School. He coached them to multiple district championships and in his first year was named coach on the district all-star team. Milam was hired in 1942 as an assistant coach at Orange High School, later becoming the head coach in 1943. He also served as Orange's athletic director. In 1945, he led the school to a 7–3 record, including a win over Port Arthur High School, which was the first time in 18 years they had accomplished this.

In 1946, Milam left Orange to become head coach and athletic director at Midland High School. He resigned following the 1948 season. Afterwards, he was hired by Rotary Engineers, a well-known logging firm. In mid-1949, he also was hired to coach the "B" team at Austin High School. After four seasons in that position, he joined Travis High School as head football coach in 1953. Milam resigned prior to the 1955 season to become assistant principal at the school. Travis had compiled a record of 8–11–1 under him.

== Later life and death ==
Milam for years served with Travis, eventually in the mid-1960s becoming head principal until he retired at the end of 1971. Milam was married and had one son. He died on December 18, 1979, at the age of 73.
