= Bellefonte Academy =

- Formerly listed on the U.S. National Register of Historic Places
- Location within Pennsylvania Location within the United States
- Location: 225 W. Bishop St., Bellefonte, Pennsylvania
- Coordinates: 40°54′37″N 77°46′47.6″W
- Area: 2 acres (0.81 ha)
- Built: 1805, 1839–1845, 1904, 1913
- Architect: Robert Cole (1904 expansion)
- Architectural style: Classical Revival
- NRHP reference No.: 76001617

Significant dates
- Added to NRHP: November 7, 1976
- Removed from NRHP: December 17, 2008

Bellefonte Academy was a historic school building located at Bellefonte, Centre County, Pennsylvania. The original building was built in 1805, as a two-story, rectangular limestone building. It was enlarged between 1839 and 1845, with the addition of two bays and wings to the north and south. After a fire in 1904, the building was rebuilt with the addition of a third story and the addition of a portico with six Tuscan order columns and Classical Revival style details. The wings were enlarged in 1913. Also on the property was the headmaster's house.

It was added to the National Register of Historic Places in 1976. It was delisted in 2008, after it was destroyed by fire on July 14, 2004. It was also included in the Bellefonte Historic District.

== Notable alumni ==
- Edward Goodrich Acheson (1856–1931), chemist
- James G. Marshall (1869–1960), industrialist and inventor
- Clifford Carlson (1894–1964), college basketball coach
- Lionel Conacher (1900–1954), Canadian athlete and politician
- Andrew Gregg Curtin (1817–1894), governor of Pennsylvania
- Luby DiMeolo (1903–1966), professional football player and coach
- J. Wesley Gephart (1853–1905), attorney and business executive
- Frank Hood (1908–1955), professional football player
- George K. James (1905–1994), college football and baseball coach
- Mose Kelsch (1897–1935), professional football player
- Martin Kottler (1910–1989), professional football player
- James H. Osmer (1832–1912), U.S. Congressman from Pennsylvania
- Franklin Guest Smith (1840–1912), U.S. Army brigadier general
- Gerald Snyder (1905–1983), professional football player
- Jake Stahl (1891–1966), professional football player and college football coach
- John Hubler Stover (1833–1889), U.S. Congressman from Missouri
- Harp Vaughan (1903–1978), professional football player
- Robert J. Walker (1801–1869), U.S. Senator from Mississippi, territorial governor of Kansas, U.S. Secretary of the Treasury
- John Montgomery Ward (1860–1925), professional baseball player
