= Joe Pilconis =

No. 2, 18, 28
- Position: End

Personal information
- Born: October 9, 1911; Shenandoah, Pennsylvania, U.S.
- Died: June 29, 1993 (aged 81); New Ringgold, Pennsylvania, U.S.
- Listed height: 6 ft 1 in (1.85 m)
- Listed weight: 189 lb (86 kg)

Career information
- High school: Frackville (Frackville, Pennsylvania)
- College: Temple (1930–1933)

Career history
- Philadelphia Eagles (1934); Shenandoah Presidents (1935); Paterson Panthers (1935); Philadelphia Eagles (1936–1937); Paterson Panthers (1938–1939)

Career NFL statistics
- Receiving yards: 113
- Touchdowns: 2
- Stats at Pro Football Reference

Joseph George Pilconis (October 9, 1911 – June 29, 1993) was an American professional football end. He played college football for the Temple Owls and later three seasons in the National Football League (NFL) for the Philadelphia Eagles.
