= John Lipski =

American football player (1904–1963)

No. 20
- Position: Center

Personal information
- Born: July 4, 1904; Pennsylvania, U.S.
- Died: January 22, 1963 (aged 58); Philadelphia, Pennsylvania, U.S.
- Listed height: 5 ft 11 in (1.80 m)
- Listed weight: 200 lb (91 kg)

Career information
- High school: Larksville (Larksville, Pennsylvania)
- College: Temple (1929–1932)

Career history
- Frankford Legion (1933); Philadelphia Eagles (1933–1934); Reading Keys (1935–1936)
- Stats at Pro Football Reference

John J. "Bull" Lipski (July 4, 1904 – January 22, 1963) was an American professional football center who played two seasons with the Philadelphia Eagles of the National Football League (NFL). He played college football at Temple University.

== Early life and college ==
John J. Lipski was born on July 4, 1904, in Pennsylvania. He attended Larksville High School in Larksville, Pennsylvania.

Lipski was a member of the Temple Owls of Temple University from 1929 to 1932. He was a three-year letterman from 1930 to 1932.

== Professional career ==
Lipski was a member of the Frankford Legion of the Interstate Football League in 1933.

He played in eight games, starting six, for the Philadelphia Eagles during the 1933 season. He appeared in ten games, starting nine, for the Eagles in 1934.

Lipski played in ten games, starting six, for the independent Reading Keys in 1935. He was also a member of the Keys during the 1936 season.

== Personal life ==
Lipski died on January 22, 1963, in Philadelphia, Pennsylvania.
