= Crosby, Pennsylvania =

- Unincorporated community
- Location within Pennsylvania Location within the United States
- Coordinates: 41°44′42″N 78°23′25″W
- Country: United States
- State: Pennsylvania
- County: McKean
- Township: Norwich
- Elevation: 1,506 ft (459 m)
- Time zone: UTC-5 (Eastern (EST))
  - Summer (DST): UTC-4 (EDT)
- ZIP code: 16724
- Area code: 814
- GNIS feature ID: 1172734

Crosby is an unincorporated community in McKean County, Pennsylvania, United States. The community is located along Pennsylvania Route 46, 5.4 miles (8.7 km) south-southeast of Smethport. Crosby has a post office with ZIP code 16724.
