= Ike Frankian =

American football player and coach (1905–1963)

Profile
- Position: End

Personal information
- Born: April 3, 1907; Worcester, Massachusetts, U.S.
- Died: April 14, 1963 (aged 56); Dos Palos, California, U.S.
- Listed height: 5 ft 11 in (1.80 m)
- Listed weight: 208 lb (94 kg)

Career information
- High school: Dinuba (CA)
- College: St. Mary's College (Cal.)

Career history

Playing
- Boston Redskins (1933); New York Giants (1934–1935); Los Angeles Bulldogs (1936–1939)

Coaching
- Los Angeles Bulldogs (1938–1948)

Awards and highlights
- NFL champion (1934); 2× PCPFL champion (1940, 1946)
- Stats at Pro Football Reference

Malcolm John Frankian (April 3, 1905 – April 14, 1963) was an American football end in the National Football League (NFL) for the Boston Redskins and the New York Giants. He also played and coached in the second American Football League, the third American Football League and the Pacific Coast Professional Football League for the Los Angeles Bulldogs.

Prior to his professional career, Frankian attended Saint Mary's College of California.

He died in Dos Palos, California.
