= Harp Vaughan =

American football player (1903–1978)

No. 21
- Position: Back

Personal information
- Born: November 19, 1903; Philadelphia, Pennsylvania, U.S.
- Died: December 26, 1978 (aged 75); Macclenny, Florida, U.S.
- Listed height: 5 ft 7 in (1.70 m)
- Listed weight: 150 lb (68 kg)

Career information
- High school: Bellefonte Academy (Bellefonte, Pennsylvania)
- College: Indiana (PA)

Career history
- Pittsburgh Pirates (1933–1934)
- Stats at Pro Football Reference

John Joseph "Harp" Vaughan (November 19, 1903 – December 26, 1978) was an American professional football player who was a back for two seasons with the Pittsburgh Pirates of the National Football League (NFL). He played college football at State Teachers College at Indiana.

== Early life and college ==
John Joseph Vaughan was born on November 19, 1903, in Philadelphia, Pennsylvania. He attended Bellefonte Academy in Bellefonte, Pennsylvania.

Vaughan played college football for the Indiana Indians of State Teachers College at Indiana.

== Professional career ==
Vaughan signed with the Pittsburgh Pirates of the National Football League in 1933. He played in eight games, starting one, for Pirates during the team's inaugural 1933 season, totaling two completions on eight passing attempts for two yards and three interceptions, 26 carries for 74 yards and one touchdown, and six catches for 101 yards. He appeared in 11 games, starting seven, in 1934, recording 19 completions on 42 passing attempts (45.2%) for 262 yards, two touchdowns, and five interceptions, 58 rushing attempts for 196 yards, and two receptions for 56 yards.

== Personal life ==
Vaughan served in the United States Army. He was later a high school and college football official. He died on December 26, 1978, in Macclenny, Florida.
