= George Kavel =

American football player (1910–1995)

No. 14
- Position: Running back

Personal information
- Born: May 3, 1910; Wendel, Pennsylvania, U.S.
- Died: July 15, 1995 (aged 85); Sarasota, Florida, U.S.
- Listed height: 5 ft 11 in (1.80 m)
- Listed weight: 170 lb (77 kg)

Career information
- High school: Norwin (PA)
- College: Carnegie Mellon

Career history
- Pittsburgh Pirates (1934); Philadelphia Eagles (1934)

Career statistics
- Rushing yards: 10
- Rush attempts: 7
- Games started: 1
- Games played: 2
- Stats at Pro Football Reference

George Charles Kavel (May 3, 1910 – July 15, 1995) was an American football player who played for the Pittsburgh Pirates and Philadelphia Eagles of the National Football League (NFL). Kavel played college football at Carnegie Mellon University.
