= Ed Thorp Memorial Trophy =

NFL championship trophy (1934–1967)

- Awarded for: Winning the NFL Championship
- Location: Main trophy: Green Bay Packers Hall of Fame; Replica trophies: Various cities
- Country: United States
- Presented by: National Football League

History
- First award: 1934
- Final award: 1967
- Most wins: Green Bay Packers (8)
- Most recent: Green Bay Packers

The Ed Thorp Memorial Trophy was the trophy awarded to the champions of the National Football League (NFL) from 1934 through 1967. The trophy was named after Ed Thorp, a noted referee, rules expert, sporting goods dealer, and friend to many of the early NFL owners. Thorp died in June 1934, and a large, traveling trophy was made later that year. It was to be passed along from champion to champion each season with each championship team's name inscribed on it.

Unlike the modern day Lombardi trophies, the Ed Thorp Memorial Trophy did not become the possession of the winning team, but instead spent a year with the winning team before being passed on to the next year's champion, much like the Grey Cup in the Canadian Football League or the Stanley Cup in the National Hockey League. For a brief period in the 1930s, teams winning the league championship were awarded a smaller replica of the Ed Thorp Memorial Trophy, which they were allowed to keep, in addition to the year spent with the larger traveling trophy.

In 2015, the trophy was found to be in the possession of the Green Bay Packers Hall of Fame, along with two other copies of it. How the trophy came to be in the possession of the Hall of Fame, rather than the team itself, was eventually solved in June 2018 by Packers historian Cliff Christl.

Some of the trophies, such as the two replicas the Green Bay Packers won in 1936 and 1939, have Thorp misspelled as Thorpe, showing that the name Ed Thorp was not a household name at the time.

== Disappearance ==
The original theory of what happened was that the Minnesota Vikings, who were thought to be the last to win the Trophy in 1969, somehow lost it when the league switched over to the Lombardi Trophy the following year. The Vikings, after winning the Thorp Trophy, went on to face the American Football League champion the Kansas City Chiefs in the AFL-NFL World Championship Game (which is more commonly referred to as Super Bowl IV). The spirit of Ed Thorp was rumored to have cursed the Vikings, since they lost the trophy that was named in his honor.

A similar incident occurred to the first trophy that was awarded to the NFL Champions, the Brunswick-Balke Collender Cup. In 1920, after the Akron Pros were awarded the league championship, that trophy also went missing (like the Thorp trophy, it too was initially to be passed down to each successive champion). The Washington Commanders replica of the Thorp Trophy is on display at FedExField.

== Rediscovery ==
In 2015, the Thorp Trophy was found to have been in the possession of the Green Bay Packers Hall of Fame instead of with the Vikings. Initially, the NFL didn't know how it got there and many theories on how it got there were proposed. Also, the trophy only included the engraved names of the winners from the 1934 New York Giants to the 1951 Los Angeles Rams, adding to the mystery. The trophy was put on display at the Packers Hall of Fame.

After some research by various teams, it was discovered that, contrary to original belief, there had been only six of the individual trophies awarded to teams for their victories, with five of them coming during then-NFL president Joseph Carr's life, and a sixth not long after his death: Those of the 1934 and 1938 New York Giants, the 1935 Detroit Lions, the 1937 Washington Redskins, and the 1936 and 1939 Green Bay Packers, along with one trophy given out to the 1961 Green Bay Packers that was first not thought to be part of the original pattern, being differently shaped than the ones originally presented.

In 2018, a Green Bay Press-Gazette photo from 1962 was donated from a fan, and a trophy base from the Packers Hall of Fame Inc. was found at the bottom of a cardboard box. With this, it was discovered that the trophy on display since 2015 was not fully displayed, with there being names of the winners engraved on the rediscovered base from the 1952 Detroit Lions to the 1967 Green Bay Packers (with the exception of the 1960 Philadelphia Eagles) and that the trophy was the same one that had been given to the Packers in 1961, which was confirmed to be the traveling Ed Thorp Trophy. After the base was discovered, it was reattached to the trophy, thus fully listing the winners from 1934 through 1969 (except 1960, 1968, and 1969) and the complete trophy is now on display at the Packers Hall of Fame.

The 1960 Philadelphia Eagles are not found engraved anywhere on the trophy, being the only team from 1934 through 1967 to not be engraved, although there is a space left for them. It had previously been assumed that the 1968 and 1969 champions, the Baltimore Colts and Minnesota Vikings (both of whom had lost their respective Super Bowls), had been awarded the trophy, but no engravings are present honoring either one. The Browns had a replica trophy created for their 1964 victory in 2004, where they put the trophy on display in the lobby of their team facility.

== List of Ed Thorp Memorial Trophy winners ==
- 1934 New York Giants
- 1935 Detroit Lions
- 1936 Green Bay Packers
- 1937 Washington Redskins
- 1938 New York Giants
- 1939 Green Bay Packers
- 1940 Chicago Bears
- 1941 Chicago Bears
- 1942 Washington Redskins
- 1943 Chicago Bears
- 1944 Green Bay Packers
- 1945 Cleveland Rams
- 1946 Chicago Bears
- 1947 Chicago Cardinals
- 1948 Philadelphia Eagles
- 1949 Philadelphia Eagles
- 1950 Cleveland Browns
- 1951 Los Angeles Rams
- 1952 Detroit Lions
- 1953 Detroit Lions
- 1954 Cleveland Browns
- 1955 Cleveland Browns
- 1956 New York Giants
- 1957 Detroit Lions
- 1958 Baltimore Colts
- 1959 Baltimore Colts
- 1960 Philadelphia Eagles
- 1961 Green Bay Packers
- 1962 Green Bay Packers
- 1963 Chicago Bears
- 1964 Cleveland Browns
- 1965 Green Bay Packers
- 1966 Green Bay Packers
- 1967 Green Bay Packers

== Total trophies won ==
Club	Winners	Winning years
Green Bay Packers	8	1936, 1939, 1944, 1961, 1962, 1965, 1966, 1967
Chicago Bears	5	1940, 1941, 1943, 1946, 1963
Cleveland Browns	4	1950, 1954, 1955, 1964
Detroit Lions	4	1935, 1952, 1953, 1957
Baltimore Colts	2	1958, 1959, 1968
New York Giants	3	1934, 1938, 1956
Philadelphia Eagles	3	1948, 1949, 1960
Cleveland/Los Angeles Rams	2	1945, 1951
Washington Redskins	2	1937, 1942
Chicago Cardinals	1	1947

== See also ==
- Vince Lombardi Trophy
- NFC Championship Game
- Brunswick-Balke Collender Cup
- List of National Football League awards
