= Jack Dempsey (American football) =

American football player (1912–1988)

No. 22
- Position: Tackle

Personal information
- Born: March 12, 1912; Scranton, Pennsylvania, U.S.
- Died: August 26, 1988 (aged 76); Saratoga, California, U.S.
- Listed height: 6 ft 2 in (1.88 m)
- Listed weight: 225 lb (102 kg)

Career information
- High school: Ridley Park
- College: Bucknell

Career history
- Pittsburgh Pirates (1934); Philadelphia Eagles (1935–1936); Pittsburgh Pirates (1937)

Career statistics
- Games played: 4
- Games started: 2
- Stats at Pro Football Reference

John Bernard Dempsey (March 12, 1912 – August 26, 1988) was an American football tackle who played for the Pittsburgh Pirates and Philadelphia Eagles of the National Football League (NFL). He played college football at Bucknell University for the Bucknell Bison.
