= Swede Ellstrom =

American football player (1906–1994)

Profile
- Position: Running back

Personal information
- Born: May 15, 1906; Moline, Illinois
- Died: April 25, 1994 (aged 87)
- Listed height: 6 ft 1 in (1.85 m)
- Listed weight: 203 lb (92 kg)

Career information
- College: Oklahoma

Career history
- 1934: Boston Redskins
- 1934: Philadelphia Eagles
- 1935: Pittsburgh Pirates
- 1936: Chicago Cardinals
- 1936: Boston Shamrocks

Marvin Lawrence "Swede" Ellstrom (May 15, 1906 – April 25, 1994) was an American football running back in the National Football League for the Boston Redskins, Philadelphia Eagles, Pittsburgh Pirates, and Chicago Cardinals. He played college football at the University of Oklahoma.
