= Bo Molenda =

American football player and coach (1905–1986)

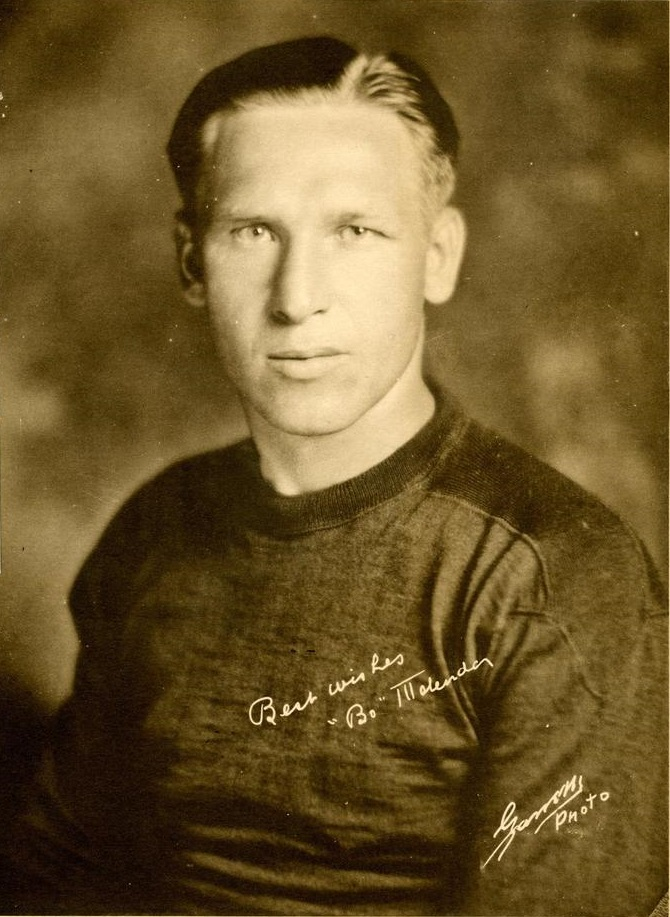

Biographical details
- Born: February 20, 1905; Oglesby, Illinois, U.S.
- Died: July 20, 1986 (aged 81); Banning, California, U.S.

Playing career
- 1925–1926: Michigan
- 1927–1928: New York Yankees
- 1928–1932: Green Bay Packers
- 1932–1935: New York Giants
- Positions: Fullback, quarterback, halfback

Coaching career (HC unless noted)
- 1936–1940: New York Giants (assistant)
- 1943: San Diego NTS
- 1947–1948: Green Bay Packers (backfield)
- 1949: Chicago Hornets (backfield)
- 1950–1969: Menlo

Head coaching record
- Overall: 7–2 (college); 79–86–3 (junior college)

Accomplishments and honors

Championships
- 4 NFL (1929, 1930, 1931, 1934); 4 Coast Conference (1951, 1954–1955, 1964)

Awards
- Second-team All-Big Ten (1925)

John Joseph "Bo" Molenda (February 20, 1905 – July 20, 1986) was an American football player and coach. He played primarily a fullback, in college for the University of Michigan and for nine seasons in the National Football League (NFL) with the New York Yankees, the Green Bay Packers. and the New York Giants. Moldena played for two Big Ten Conference championship teams at Michigan and four NFL championship teams, three with the Packers and one with the Giants. Molenda was the backfield coach for the Packers in 1947 and 1948, as has the same with the Chicago Hornets of the All-America Football Conference (AAFC) in 1949. He served as the head football coach at Menlo College, then a junior college, located in Atherton, California, from 1950 to 1969.

== Youth ==
Molenda was born in Illinois and attended school in Decatur. He helped the Durfee School in Decatur win the Major School league cup. He moved with his family to Detroit, where he attended Detroit Northeastern High School. At Northeastern High, he was considered one of the best athletes ever produced by the city's school system. When Molenda and Bennie Oosterbaan both enrolled at the University of Michigan in September 1924, a newspaper report called them "two of the greatest all round athletes ever turned out in Michigan prep school ranks." In high school, Molenda excelled in football, baseball, basketball and track. He was selected as an All-American center in basketball at the national basketball tournament as a senior in high school.

== University of Michigan ==
Molenda played fullback for the Michigan Wolverines teams that won Big Ten championships in 1925 and 1926. In 1925, Molenda made a name for himself with his defensive performance against the University of Illinois team led by Red Grange. In 1924, Grange had scored four touchdowns against Michigan in the span of ten minutes, and stopping Grange was the key to beating Illinois in 1925. Michigan won the game and stopped Grange, and the Associated Press credited Molenda's efforts: "Molenda was the principal reason why the Illini's aerial attack was unsuccessful. Time after time he got in the way to make the pass incomplete or to gather it in his arms." Molenda was reported to have intercepted five passes in the Illinois game. Molenda also scored three touchdowns in Michigan's 1925 victory over Navy. Molenda was picked as a second-team All-American in 1925. Michigan Coach Fielding Yost said the 1925 team with Benny Friedman, Bennie Oosterbaan, and Molenda was the best team he ever coached. The 1925 team outscored its opponents 225–3, but lost to Northwestern, 3–2, on a muddy Soldier Field in Chicago.

Sophomores Molenda and Oosterbaan also paired up on Michigan's basketball team in 1926, leading some to conclude they were "even better cagers than footballers, which, by the way, is saying quite a little." Molenda was a tough defensive player in basketball and was also the Wolverines' top scorer in 1926, until poor classroom performance resulted in his being placed on the "home list" in February 1926.

Molenda overcame his academic ineligibility in time for the 1926 football season. In a close victory over Illinois, Molenda scored Michigan's only touchdown.

After the football season ended, Molenda again returned to his place on the Michigan basketball team. However, the university announced in February 1927 that Molenda had been again placed on the "home list" due to low grades, making him ineligible to re-enter the university for one year.

== Professional athlete ==
=== Basketball in Flint ===
In February 1927, two weeks after being sent home due to academic deficiencies, Molenda signed a contract to pay professional basketball for the Industrial Mutual Association in Flint, Michigan.

=== Football for the New York Yankees ===
In June 1927, he signed a contract to play professional football for the New York Yankees team organized by sports promoter, C. C. Pyle, and featuring Red Grange. He played for the Yankees through the complete 1927–1928 season. He scored the Yankees' only touchdown in a 7-0 win on Wrigley baseball field in Los Angeles in January 1928.

=== Baseball in Texas ===
In December 1927, Molenda signed a contract to play professional baseball for the Waco team in Texas League starting in March 1928. He had been considered one of the top pitchers in the Detroit high school system. When he reported to Waco in March 1928, he brought his new bride with him, and the Associated Press reported that a number of major league clubs had been angling for his services. In late June 1928, Molenda was sent to the Texarkana club in the Lone Star League.

=== Baseball and football in Green Bay ===
As a fullback, Molenda became one of the stars of the early Packers teams that won NFL championships in 1929, 1930, and 1931.

==== 1928 Packers ====
In November 1928, the Green Bay Packers purchased Molenda's contracts from Charlie Pyle, and one Wisconsin newspaper wrote: "Packer football stock climbed a notch or two here Thursday when Bo Molenda, one of the best fullbacks in the National Football league, joined the Big Bay Blues. ... With Molenda in the fold, the Packer squad is beginning to figure on a national championship. A big powerful fullback like Molenda rounds out the Bay machine to a nicety."

==== 1929 Green Sox ====
After playing several games with the Packers, Molenda went to California in early 1929 where he pitched in the winter league. He reported to the Denver baseball team in the spring of 1929, but was able to secure his release when he learned of an industrial opening in Green Bay. In June 1929, Molenda returned to Green Bay to establish his residence there and signed a contract to play for Green Bay's professional baseball team, the Green Sox of the Bay Fox River Valley League. Molenda had success for the Green Sox, striking out 14 batters in six innings of relief pitching in one game, striking out 10 and 11 in other games, and pitching a three-hit shutout. Molenda pitched for the Green Sox again in the summer of 1931.

==== 1929 Packers ====
Even before the first game of the 1929 season, the Packers, with Molenda at fullback, were being touted as "the greatest team ever." The Packers won their first NFL championship in 1929 after a key 20-6 win over a New York Giants team led by Molenda's former Michigan teammate, Benny Friedman. Molenda scored a touchdown and kicked two extra points in the game as Molenda and Johnny Blood were credited with leading the Packers offense. The 1929 game against the Giants has gone down as one of the great games in Packers' history, in part due to the fact that only 12 Packers played in the game, with the 12th player coming into the game as a last minute substitute. Newspapers described Molenda as the "sparkplug" and the workhorse of the 1929 Packers: "Molenda was the workhorse. He played 60 minutes in nearly every game." The 1929 Packers were the first NFL team to finish the season undefeated with a 13-0 record as the undisputed NFL champions. After the 1929 season, Molenda worked for an engineering concern.

==== 1930 and 1931 Packers ====
Molenda continued to play fullback for the Packers in 1930 and 1931, as the Packers won three consecutive NFL championships. Though Molenda's contributions as a blocker and defensive player do not show up in offensive statistics, he also ranked as the Packers' fourth-leading scorer in 1929 and 1930 and as the fifth-leading scorer in 1931.

=== New York Giants ===
In 1931, the Packers sold Molenda to the New York Giants, where he played until 1936. He was credited with "carrying the brunt of the Giants' victorious offense in the famous "gumshoe game" against the Chicago Bears in 1934.

In his football career, he blocked for Benny Friedman, Red Grange and Johnny Blood. He played in 111 NFL games and scored 108 points in NFL play, including 24 extra points, 12 rushing touchdowns, one receiving touchdown, and one interception returned for a touchdown.

== Football coach and service in World War II ==
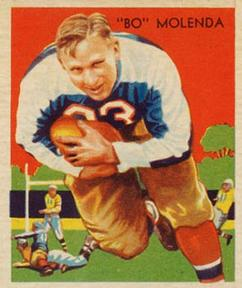
Molenda in 1935

=== New York Giants ===
In 1936, he was hired as an assistant coach for the New York Giants, a position he held until 1941. In December 1939, with Giants' head coach Steve Owen absent due to the death of his mother, Molenda led the Giants in the 1939 NFC Championship Game against the Packers. The Packers beat the Giants in Milwaukee, 27–0, to win the title.

In 1941, Molenda worked as a baseball umpire in the International League.

=== Naval service in World War II ===
With the U.S. entry into World War II, Molenda enlisted in the Navy in early 1942 as a chief petty officer. After duty at Redlands University in charge of the Navy's physical education program, Molenda was promoted to a lieutenant and assigned in the September 1943 as the head coach of the football team at the naval training station in San Diego. His 1943 San Diego Naval Training Station Bluejackets football team defeated both UCLA and USC. The victory over USC, by a 10–7 score, drew attention as the Trojans had been undefeated front-ranking team that had not been scored on in the first six games of the season. In January 1944, Molenda was shipped overseas to active duty in the Pacific where he took part in the Hollandia and Leyte invasions. Molenda later recalled that he was in the Philippines "going on 28 months." He was supposed to have been rotated at 18 months, but the Navy lost his records and he was stuck. One day, George Halas visited and asked Molenda if he would like to return home. Molenda said yes, and two weeks later Molenda was back in the United States. He noted, "That's why I like George Halas."

=== Green Bay Packers ===
In the spring of 1947, Molenda was living in Manhattan Beach, California and working as a baseball umpire. At that time, Curly Lambeau hired Molenda to return to Green Bay as the Packers' backfield coach. In March 1948, the Packers signed Molenda for a second season as the team's backfield coach. In 1948, the Packers had the worst season in club history, finishing with a 3–9 record. In February 1949, head coach Curly Lambeau announced a wholesale shakeup in the coaching staff, and Molenda was replaced after two years coaching the team's backs.

=== Chicago Hornets ===
In March 1949, Molenda signed with the Chicago Hornets of the All-America Football Conference (AAFC) as the team's backfield coach. He spent the 1949 football season in Chicago with the Hornets.

=== Menlo ===
In March 1950, Molenda was hired as the athletic director and head football coach at Menlo College in Atherton, California. He remained at Menlo for nearly 20 years, retiring in 1969. Molenda's Menlo College team's won seven championships, but went into a winless streak in 1966 that lasted until 1968. Molenda won national attention when he noticed a soccer player go into convulsions after being knocked unconscious in a collision with another player. Molenda was credited with saving the unconscious player's life after he pried the player's mouth open with his pipe and pulled his tongue clear of his windpipe. During Molenda's final game as a coach was a November 1969, after which Molenda told a reporter: "I've played on nine championship teams during my career, and last Saturday was a helluva way to end it all. We lost 70-6." He was inducted into the Menlo College of Atherton Hall of Fame in 1999.

== Later years ==
In 1975, 13 living members of the 1925 Michigan team, including Molenda, Benny Friedman, and Bennie Oosterbaan returned to Ann Arbor and were introduced to the homecoming crowd of 93,000 fans. Molenda died in July 1986 in Banning, California. After his death in 1986, the Pro Football Hall of Fame's veterans committee was reportedly considering Molenda as a possible inductee. He was buried in Riverside National Cemetery in Riverside, California.

== Head coaching record ==
=== College ===
Year	Team	Overall	Conference	Standing	Bowl/playoffs
San Diego Naval Training Station Bluejackets (Independent) (1943)
1943	San Diego NTS	7–2			
San Diego NTS:		7–2			
Total:		7–2			

=== Junior college ===
Year	Team	Overall	Conference	Standing	Bowl/playoffs
Menlo Oaks (Northern California Junior College Conference) (1950)
1950	Menlo	3–5–1	1–5	T–7th (Southern)	
Menlo Oaks (Coast Conference) (1951–1969)
1951	Menlo	8–0	4–0	1st	
1952	Menlo	4–3–1	2–2	3rd	
1953	Menlo	5–2	2–2	T–2nd	
1954	Menlo	7–1	4–0	1st	
1955	Menlo	7–0–1	4–0	1st	
1956	Menlo	7–2	4–1	2nd	
1957	Menlo	1–7	0–5	6th	
1958	Menlo	3–5	1–4	5th	
1959	Menlo	3–6	1–5	6th	
1960	Menlo	2–7	0–6	8th	
1961	Menlo	4–5	2–5	6th	
1962	Menlo	3–5	2–3	T–4th	
1963	Menlo	4–4	2–3	4th	
1964	Menlo	8–1	4–0	1st	
1965	Menlo	3–6	1–5	T–6th	
1966	Menlo	4–5	2–5	T–5th	
1967	Menlo	0–9	0–8	9th	
1968	Menlo	1–7	1–4	5th	
1969	Menlo	2–6	0–5	6th	
Compton:		79–86–3	37–68		
Total:		79–86–3			
National championship Conference title Conference division title or championship game berth

== See also ==
- History of the New York Giants (1925–1978)
- 1925 All-America college football team
