= Ted Thorpe (footballer, born 1910) =

English footballer

Albert Edward Thorpe (14 July 1910 – 1971) was an English footballer.

He played for Langwith Colliery, Shirebrook, Wolverhampton Wanderers, Mansfield Town, Notts County, Norwich City, Crystal Palace, Bath City, Scunthorpe & Lindsey United and Hereford United.
