= Peter Rajkovich =

American football player (1911–1979)

Peter Joseph Rajkovich (January 17, 1911 – November 13, 1979) was an American football fullback who played during the 1934 season for the Pittsburgh Pirates. Rajkovich ran for 140 yards in his career on 39 attempts, scoring 0 rushing touchdowns. He played college football for the University of Detroit Mercy.
