= Diddy Willson =

American football player (1911–1961)

No. 15, 14
- Position: Guard

Personal information
- Born: January 17, 1911; Crosby, Pennsylvania, U.S.
- Died: January 19, 1961 (aged 50); Phelps, New York, U.S.
- Listed height: 5 ft 10 in (1.78 m)
- Listed weight: 196 lb (89 kg)

Career information
- High school: Oakfield (NY)
- College: Pennsylvania

Career history
- Philadelphia Eagles (1933–1935)
- Stats at Pro Football Reference

Osbern Putnam "Diddy" Willson (January 17, 1911 – January 19, 1961) was an American professional football guard who played three seasons with the Philadelphia Eagles of the National Football League (NFL). He played college football for the Penn Quakers.

== Early life ==
Osbern Putnam Willson was born on January 17, 1911, in Crosby, Pennsylvania. He attended Oakfield High School in Oakfield, New York.

Willson played college football for the Penn Quakers of the University of Pennsylvania. He was on the freshman team in 1929 and was a three-year letterman from 1930 to 1932. He also played water polo and lacrosse for the Quakers.

== Professional career ==
Willson played in seven games, starting one, for the Philadelphia Eagles during the team's inaugural 1933 season. He started all 11 games in 1934 as the Eagles finished 4–7. He started ten games during the 1935 season as Philadelphia went 2–9. Wilson stood 5'10" and weighed 196 pounds.

== Personal life ==
Wilson died on January 19, 1961, in Phelps, New York.
