= Luby DiMeolo =

American football player and coach (1903–1966)

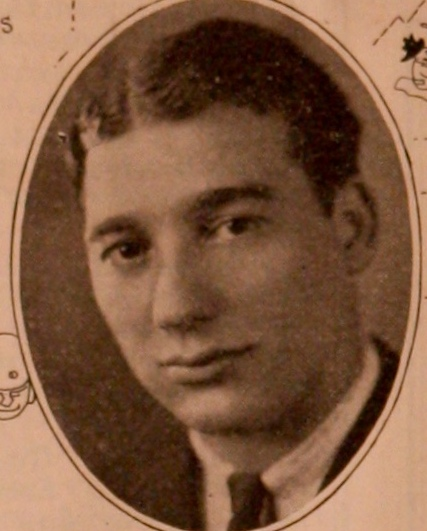
- DiMeolo at the University of Pittsburgh in 1929

Profile
- Position: Head coach

Personal information
- Born: October 27, 1903; Youngstown, Ohio, U.S.
- Died: June 17, 1966 (aged 62); Pittsburgh, Pennsylvania, U.S.

Career information
- High school: Bellefonte Academy
- College: Pittsburgh

Career history
- 1930–1933: NYU (assistant)
- 1934: Pittsburgh Pirates
- 1935: Westminster (PA) (assistant)
- 1937: Carnegie Tech (assistant)

Awards and highlights
- Third-team All-American (1929)
- Coaching profile at Pro Football Reference

Other information
- Military career
- Allegiance: United States
- Branch: U.S. Navy
- Rank: Lt. Commander
- Conflicts: World War II

Albert A. "Luby" DiMeolo (October 27, 1903 – June 17, 1966) was an American football player and coach. He was the second ever head coach for the Pittsburgh Pirates (later renamed the Steelers) of the National Football League. He coached the Pirates during their second season of 1934.

== Early life ==
He was born in Youngstown, Ohio, but lived nearly his entire life in Coraopolis, Pennsylvania, just west of Pittsburgh.

== College career ==
DiMeolo was a guard and captain on the 1929 University of Pittsburgh team that was undefeated before losing in the 1930 Rose Bowl to USC.

== Coaching career ==
=== New York University ===
Upon graduating from Pittsburgh, DiMeolo served as offensive line coach at New York University under head coach Chick Meehan and later Howard Cann.

=== Pittsburgh Pirates ===
When the Pittsburgh Pirates (who later would be renamed the Pittsburgh Steelers) joined the NFL in 1933, DiMeolo was rumored to be the leading candidate to become the team's initial player-coach. He was passed over for the job in favor of Jap Douds, who lasted just a single season as the team's coach. DiMeolo replaced Douds for the team's second season.

The Pirates started strong under DiMeolo, defeating the Cincinnati Reds with a final score of 13-0 before losing three consecutive games and being shut out in two. His team escaped with a narrow 9-7 victory over the Philadelphia Eagles and subsequently lost all of their remaining games. Under DiMeolo, the Pirates were shutout in six of their 12 games, scoring just a total of 51 points during the season and allowing 206. They achieved 2470 yards of total offense during the season (952 passing, 1,518 rushing), equating to about 205 per game, and only scored six total touchdowns collectively, four passing and two rushing.

He led the Pirates to a disappointing 2–10 record in his first season, after which he was dismissed.

=== Return to collegiate coaching ===
After leaving the Pirates, DiMeolo returned to the college ranks as an assistant coach at Westminster College (Pennsylvania) and later at Carnegie Tech.

== Navy career and later life ==
He joined the navy during World War II and served as a physical instructor, rising to the rank of lieutenant commander.

After leaving the navy, DiMeolo worked in the Pennsylvania state Department of Commerce, before losing his position due to a change in the political party running the government. He was shortly thereafter named a U.S. Marshal for western Pennsylvania. He served as Marshal until 1961, after which he worked for U.S. Steel.

DiMeolo was married to Amelia Ann Sciliano; the couple had no children. He died at the age of 62 of a heart attack which occurred shortly after he had completed a game of squash in 1966.
