= Bill Sortet =

American football player (1912–1998)

Profile
- Position: End

Personal information
- Born: June 25, 1912; Vincennes, Indiana, U.S.
- Died: January 22, 1998 (aged 85); Charleston, West Virginia, U.S.

Career information
- College: West Virginia

Career history
- 1933–1940: Pittsburgh Pirates/Steelers

Wilbur John "Bill" Sortet (June 25, 1912 – January 22, 1998) was an American gridiron football end who played eight seasons in the National Football League (NFL) for the Pittsburgh Pirates/Steelers. Sortet attended West Virginia University.

A 1939 official program for a Pirates intra-squad game shows Sortet's position as "R.G." and weighing 190 lbs.
