= Algy Clark =

American football player (1904–1968)

Profile
- Positions: Running back, tackle

Personal information
- Born: May 7, 1904; Franklin, Ohio, U.S.
- Died: November 15, 1968 (aged 64); Dayton, Ohio, U.S.

Career information
- College: Ohio State

Career history
- 1930: Brooklyn Dodgers
- 1931: Cleveland Indians
- 1932: Boston Braves
- 1933: Cincinnati Reds
- 1934: St. Louis Gunners
- 1934: Philadelphia Eagles
- Coaching profile at Pro Football Reference

Myers Arden "Algy" Clark (May 7, 1904 – November 15, 1968) was an American professional football player in the National Football League (NFL) for the Brooklyn Dodgers, Cleveland Indians, Boston Braves, Cincinnati Reds, St. Louis Gunners, and Philadelphia Eagles. He played college football at Ohio State University.

Clark also coached the Cincinnati Reds during their truncated 1933 season. He died at Dayton at the age of 64 in 1968.
