= Hal McPhail =

American football player (1912–1977)

- McPhail in 1931

Profile
- Position: Fullback

Personal information
- Born: October 26, 1912; Columbus, Ohio, U.S.
- Died: August 30, 1977 (aged 64); Fort Thomas, Kentucky, U.S.
- Listed height: 6 ft 2 in (1.88 m)
- Listed weight: 240 lb (109 kg)

Career information
- College: Army (1929); Xavier (1930–1932)

Career history
- Boston Redskins (1934–1935); Cincinnati Bengals (1937–1938); Columbus Bullies (1939)

Career statistics
- Games played: 18
- Rushing yards: 461
- Points: 22

Harold Thomas McPhail (October 26, 1912 – August 1977) was an American football fullback.

McPhail was born in 1912 in Saginaw, Michigan. He attended Aquinas High School in Columbus, Ohio. He played college football for the 1929 Army Cadets football team and for the 1930, 1931, and 1932 Xavier Musketeers football teams. He was elected captain of the 1932 team.

McPhail also played professional football in the National Football League (NFL) for the Boston Redskins during the 1934 and 1935 seasons. He appeared in 18 games for the Redskins, scoring 22 points and rushing for 461 yards. He also played in the American Football League for the Cincinnati Bengals in 1937 and 1938 and for the Columbus Bullies in 1939.

After his football career ended, McPhail worked as a clerk for Cincinnati Annex of the Post Office. He died of a heart attack at age 64 in 1977 while mowing the grass at his home in Fort Thomas, Kentucky.
