= Jim Leonard (American football, born 1910) =

American football player and coach (1910–1993)

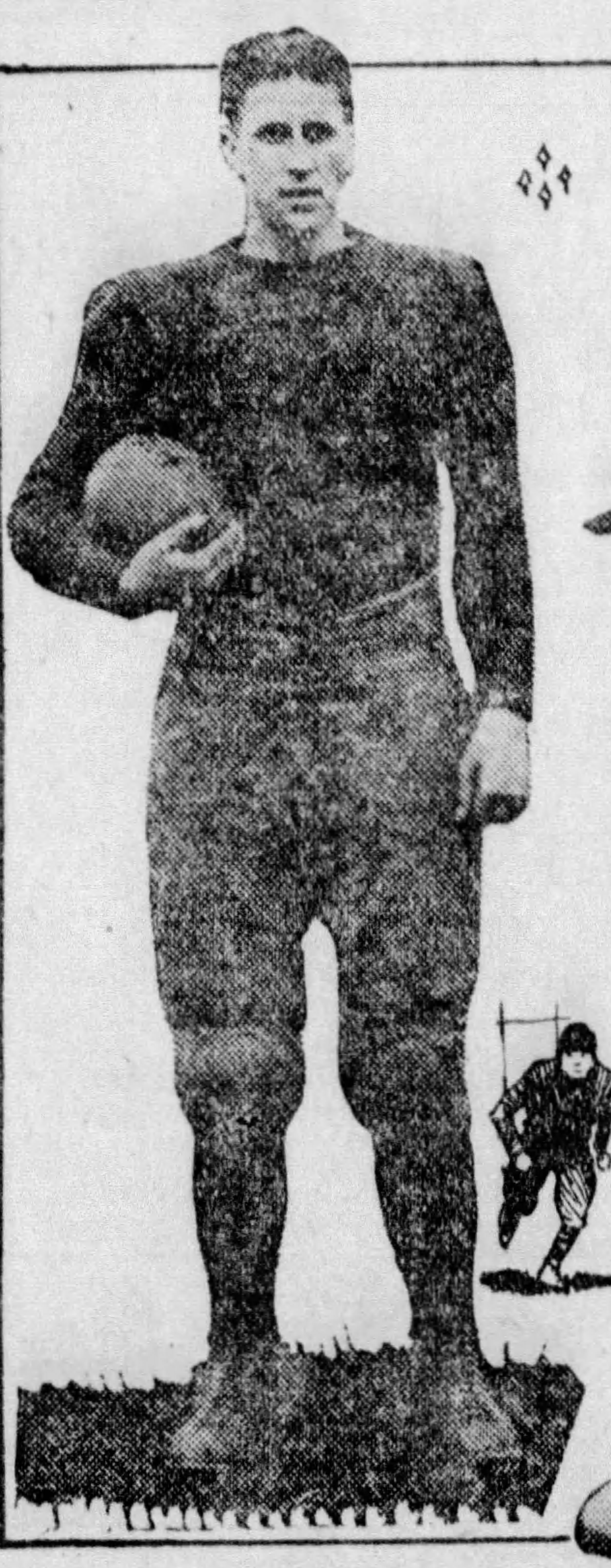
- Leonard in 1923

No. 19
- Positions: Blocking back, fullback

Personal information
- Born: February 14, 1910; Pedricktown, New Jersey, U.S.
- Died: November 28, 1993 (aged 83); Woodbury, New Jersey, U.S.
- Listed height: 6 ft 0 in (1.83 m)
- Listed weight: 204 lb (93 kg)

Career information
- High school: Saint Joseph's Prep (Philadelphia, Pennsylvania)
- College: Notre Dame

Career history

Playing
- Philadelphia Eagles (1934–1937)

Coaching
- Saint Francis (PA) (1938–1941) (head coach); Pittsburgh Steelers (1942) (assistant); Holy Cross (MA) (1943) (assistant); Pittsburgh Steelers (1945) (head coach); Saint Francis (PA) (1947) (head coach); Villanova (1949–1950) (head coach)
- Coaching profile at Pro Football Reference

James Raymond Leonard Sr. (February 14, 1910 – November 28, 1993) was an American professional football player who was a running back in the National Football League (NFL) for the Philadelphia Eagles. He was also the head coach for the Pittsburgh Steelers in 1945.

Leonard was a two sport star at the University of Notre Dame during the 1930s, both as a pitcher in baseball and a fullback in football. After Notre Dame he played for the Philadelphia Eagles for three seasons and was team captain in 1935 and 1936. He left the Eagles to restart the football program at Saint Francis College in Loretto, Pennsylvania, in 1937.

In 1942 he joined the NFL again as a staff coach for the Pittsburgh Steelers, then served as an assistant at the College of the Holy Cross in 1943 before returning to the Steelers as head coach during the 1945 campaign. In 1947 he restarted the football program at Saint Francis College in Loretto, Pennsylvania. It was stopped because of World War II. He finished his career as the head coach of Villanova University from 1949 to 1950.

== Head coaching record ==
=== College ===
Year	Team	Overall	Conference	Standing	Bowl/playoffs	AP^{#}
Saint Francis Red Flash (Independent) (1938–1941)
1938	Saint Francis	1–6				
1939	Saint Francis	0–7–1				
1940	Saint Francis	6–2				
1941	Saint Francis	6–0–1				
Saint Francis Red Flash (Independent) (1947)
1947	Saint Francis	4–1				
Saint Francis:		17–16–2				
Villanova Wildcats (Independent) (1949–1950)
1949	Villanova	8–1				13
1950	Villanova	4–5				
Villanova:		12–6				
Total:		29–22–2				
^{#}Rankings from final AP Poll.
