= 1934 NFL season =

American football season

Regular season
- Duration: September 9 – December 9, 1934
- East Champions: New York Giants
- West Champions: Chicago Bears

Championship Game
- Champions: New York Giants

NFL teams: West, East

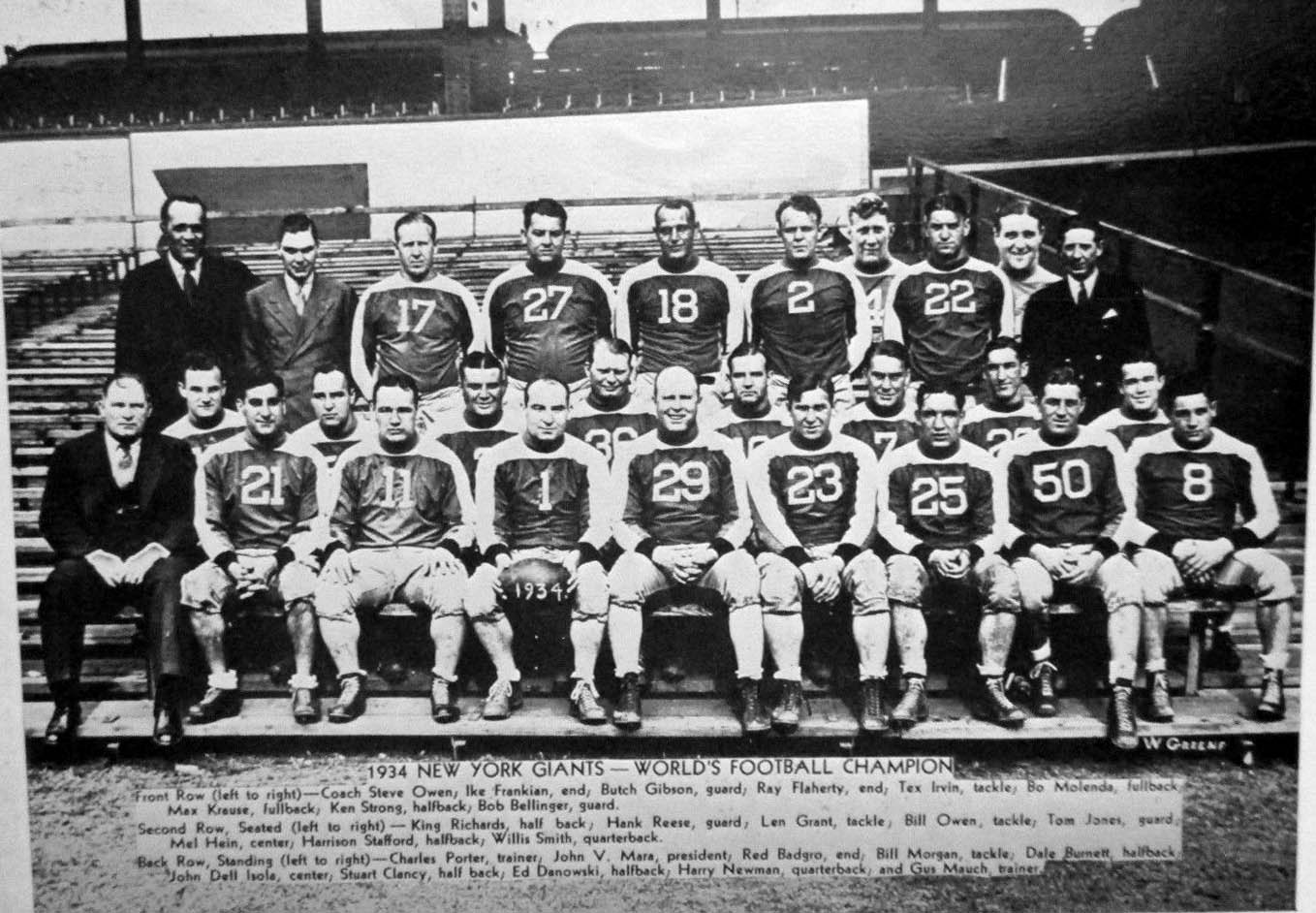
The New York Giants roster posing for a team photo

The 1934 NFL season was the 15th regular season of the National Football League (NFL). Before the season, the Portsmouth Spartans moved from Ohio to Detroit, Michigan, and were renamed the Detroit Lions.

The season ended on December 9 with the NFL Championship Game played for the new Ed Thorp Memorial Trophy. In this final game the New York Giants defeated the Chicago Bears 30–13 at the Polo Grounds in what has become known as the "Sneakers Game".

== Overview ==
A total of 60 regular season games were played during course of the 1934 season. This was followed by the single game play-off between the Eastern division champion New York Giants and the Chicago Bears, undefeated winners of the Western division. This 1934 NFL Championship Game, held December 9 in New York City, was won by the Giants, 30 - 13, denying the Bears the first ever undefeated, untied season.

The Cincinnati Reds lost their first eight games — being shellacked 243–10 in the process — and then were suspended for not paying league dues. The St. Louis Gunners, an independent team, played the last three games of the Reds' 1934 schedule in their stead, managing a surprising shutout victory over the Pittsburgh Pirates in the process.

The top offensive team for the second consecutive year was the Chicago Bears, who racked up 3,750 yards — topping their 1933 total by more than 700. Three other teams — the Boston Redskins, Detroit Lions, and Green Bay Packers — also finished with more yards gained than the 1933 high water mark.

Despite the increase in yardage gained around the league, total passing totals showed a decline, with the average completion rate falling to 30.4% despite an almost equal number of attempts in 1934 compared to 1933. Coaching attention to pass defense hampered the aerial attack although opening up running lanes, with the counterintuitive result that the league's increased offensive output came via the ground rather than the air. Bears rookie running back Beattie Feathers set a new league record of 1,004 yards in 11 games, averaging 9.9 yards per carry en route to shattering the old league mark by nearly 300 yards.

The top defensive unit of 1934 was the Detroit Lions — the freshly relocated and rebranded incarnation of the Portsmouth Spartans. The Lions shut out their first 7 opponents of the year in marching to a 10–0 record, only to lose once to the Packers and twice to the Bears to fall from contention. The Lions still managed to finish the year allowing only 59 points — a niggardly 4.5 points per contest.

The move of the goal posts to the goal line in an attempt to increase the number of field goals accomplished the desired aim of reducing deadlocked results, with more than 20 games decided by three points or less and no games ending in a tie for the first time since the league's inception.

This season would also start a long tradition, which the Detroit Lions would play on Thanksgiving, a holiday they have played every year since.

== Teams ==
The league again included 10 teams during the 1934 season. However, the Cincinnati Reds franchise folded mid-season, with its final three games picked up by the St. Louis Gunners.

| First season in NFL * | Last active season † |

| Team | Head coach | Stadium |
|---|---|---|
| Boston Redskins | William Dietz | Fenway Park |
| Brooklyn Dodgers | Cap McEwan | Ebbets Field |
| Chicago Bears | George Halas | Wrigley Field |
| Chicago Cardinals | Paul J. Schissler | Comiskey Park |
| Cincinnati Reds † | Algy Clark | (various) |
| Detroit Lions | George Clark | University of Detroit Stadium |
| Green Bay Packers | Curly Lambeau | City Stadium and Wisconsin State Fair Park |
| New York Giants | Steve Owen | Polo Grounds |
| Philadelphia Eagles | Lud Wray | Baker Bowl |
| Pittsburgh Pirates | Luby DiMeolo | Forbes Field |
| St. Louis Gunners † | Chile Walsh | Sportsman's Park |

== Major rule changes ==
- A hand-to-hand forward pass made behind the line of scrimmage that becomes incomplete (hits the ground before it is caught) is to be ruled as a fumble.
- Incomplete passes no longer result in a five-yard penalty

== Final standings ==
NFL Eastern Division
| | W | L | T | PCT | DIV | PF | PA | STK |
|---|---|---|---|---|---|---|---|---|
| New York Giants | 8 | 5 | 0 | .615 | 7–1 | 147 | 107 | L1 |
| Boston Redskins | 6 | 6 | 0 | .500 | 5–3 | 107 | 94 | W1 |
| Brooklyn Dodgers | 4 | 7 | 0 | .364 | 4–4 | 61 | 153 | L3 |
| Philadelphia Eagles | 4 | 7 | 0 | .364 | 3–5 | 127 | 85 | W2 |
| Pittsburgh Pirates | 2 | 10 | 0 | .167 | 1–7 | 51 | 206 | L7 |

Note: Tie games were not officially counted in the standings until 1972.

NFL Western Division
| | W | L | T | PCT | DIV | PF | PA | STK |
|---|---|---|---|---|---|---|---|---|
| Chicago Bears | 13 | 0 | 0 | 1.000 | 8–0 | 286 | 86 | W13 |
| Detroit Lions | 10 | 3 | 0 | .769 | 5–3 | 238 | 59 | L3 |
| Green Bay Packers | 7 | 6 | 0 | .538 | 4–5 | 156 | 112 | W1 |
| Chicago Cardinals | 5 | 6 | 0 | .455 | 4–5 | 80 | 84 | W1 |
| St. Louis Gunners | 1 | 2 | 0 | .333 | 0–2 | 27 | 61 | L2 |
| Cincinnati Reds | 0 | 8 | 0 | .000 | 0–6 | 10 | 243 | L8 |

== NFL Championship Game ==
N.Y. Giants 30, Chi. Bears 13 at Polo Grounds, New York City, December 9, 1934

== Statistical leaders ==
The 1934 season marked the third year in which official statistics were tracked and retained by the NFL. Certain statistics later regarded as staples were not maintained, including interceptions, punting average, kickoff return yardage and average, and field goal percentage, among others.

Halfback Beattie Feathers of the Chicago Bears rushed for more than 1,000 yards for the first time in league history. This shattered the previous league record by nearly 300 yards. In the table below, ‡ denotes a new NFL record.

| | Name | Team | Yards |
|---|---|---|---|
| Passing | 1. Arnie "Flash" Heber | Green Bay Packers | 799 |
| | 2. Warren Heller | Pittsburgh Pirates | 511 |
| | 3. Harry Newman | New York Giants | 391 |
| Rushing | 1. Beattie Feathers | Chicago Bears | 1,004 ‡ |
| | 2. Swede Hanson | Philadelphia Eagles | 805 |
| | 3. Dutch Clark | Detroit Lions | 763 |
| Receiving | 1. Harry Ebding | Detroit Lions | 264 |
| | 2. Joe Carter | Philadelphia Eagles | 238 |
| | 3. Joe Skladany | Pittsburgh Pirates | 222 |
| Touchdowns | 1. Beattie Feathers | Chicago Bears | 9 ‡ |
| | 2. Swede Hanson | Philadelphia Eagles | 8 |
| | 2. Dutch Clark | Detroit Lions | 8 |

Source: Gary Gillette, et al. (eds.), The ESPN Pro Football Encyclopedia. First Edition. New York: Sterling Publishing, 2006; p. 1042.

== Coaching changes ==
- Cincinnati Reds: Algy Clark served as head coach, replacing Al Jolley and Mike Palm (who served three and seven games of the previous season, respectively).
- Pittsburgh Pirates: Forrest Douds was replaced by Luby DiMeolo.
- St. Louis Gunners: The team entered the league with Chile Walsh as head coach.

== Stadium changes ==
- The Cincinnati Reds played each of the four home games at different stadiums: Cincinnati's Crosley Field, Dayton's Triangle Park, Portsmouth's Universal Stadium, and Xavier University's Corcoran Stadium.
- The relocated Detroit Lions moved from Portsmouth's Universal Stadium to University of Detroit Stadium
- The Green Bay Packers home games in Milwaukee moved from Borchert Field to Wisconsin State Fair Park
- The St. Louis Gunners played their home games at Sportsman's Park

== Awards ==
The Ed Thorp Memorial Trophy was established as the league's award for the NFL champion, and was awarded through 1967. The host team for the NFL Championship Game would now alternate between the two divisions, with the Eastern Division champion hosting in even-numbered years, and the Western champion hosting in odd-numbered years.
