= 1935 Detroit Lions season =

NFL team season (won NFL Championship)

- Owner: George A. Richards
- General manager: Potsy Clark
- Head coach: Potsy Clark
- Home stadium: University of Detroit Stadium

Results
- Record: 7–3–2
- Division place: 1st NFL Western
- Playoffs: Won NFL Championship (vs. Giants) 26–7

The 1935 Detroit Lions season was the franchise's 6th season in the National Football League (NFL) and second in Detroit. Under fifth-year head coach Potsy Clark, the Lions placed first in the NFL's Western Division and defeated the New York Giants 26–7 in the NFL Championship Game for their first league title.

The leading offensive players were Dutch Clark, who led the NFL with 55 points, and Ernie Caddel, who led the league with 621 yards from scrimmage and 6.4 yards per touch.

== Schedule ==
| Game | Date | Opponent | Result | Record | Venue | Recap |
|---|---|---|---|---|---|---|
| 1 | September 20 | Philadelphia Eagles | **W** 35–0 | 1–0 | University of Detroit Stadium | Recap |
| 2 | September 29 | **Chicago Cardinals** | **T** 10–10 | 1–0–1 | University of Detroit Stadium | Recap |
| 3 | October 6 | at Brooklyn Dodgers | **L** 10–12 | 1–1–1 | Ebbets Field | Recap |
| 4 | October 13 | at Boston Redskins | **W** 17–7 | 2–1–1 | Fenway Park | Recap |
| 5 | October 20 | at **Green Bay Packers** | **L** 9–13 | 2–2–1 | Wisconsin State Fair Park | Recap |
| 6 | October 30 | Boston Redskins | **W** 14–0 | 3–2–1 | University of Detroit Stadium | Recap |
| 7 | November 3 | at **Chicago Cardinals** | **W** 7–6 | 4–2–1 | Wrigley Field | Recap |
| 8 | November 10 | at **Green Bay Packers** | **L** 7–31 | 4–3–1 | City Stadium | Recap |
| 9 | November 17 | **Green Bay Packers** | **W** 20–10 | 5–3–1 | University of Detroit Stadium | Recap |
| 10 | November 24 | at **Chicago Bears** | **T** 20–20 | 5–3–2 | Wrigley Field | Recap |
| 11 | November 28 | **Chicago Bears** | **W** 14–2 | 6–3–2 | University of Detroit Stadium | Recap |
| 12 | December 1 | Brooklyn Dodgers | **W** 28–0 | 7–3–2 | University of Detroit Stadium | Recap |
Note: Intra-division opponents are in **bold** text.

== Season summary ==
=== Week 1: Lions 35, Eagles 0 ===
On Friday, September 20, 1935, the Lions opened their season with a 35–0 victory over the Philadelphia Eagles before a crowd of approximately 10,000 at University of Detroit Stadium. Halfback Ernie Caddel scored three touchdowns. Dutch Clark also scored a touchdown, and a fifth came on a 10-yard pass from Pug Vaughan to Frank Christensen. Clark kicked four extra points, and Glenn Presnell kicked the fifth. The Lions prevented the Eagles from making a first down. The Lions totaled 381 total yards against the Eagles, including 324 rushing yards on 57 carries for an average of 6.8 yards per carry. Following the game, the Associated Press reported that the Lions has "definitely established themselves as serious contenders for the 1935 National Professional football league championship."

=== Week 2: Lions 10, Cardinals 10 ===
On September 29, 1935, in the second game of the season, the Lions and Chicago Cardinals played to a 10–10 tie in front of approximately 10,000 spectators at the University of Detroit Stadium. The Lions trailed 3-0 at halftime but scored a touchdown in the third quarter on a 15-yard pass from Dutch Clark to John Schneller. Chicago retook the lead with a touchdown early in the fourth quarter. The Lions then tied the score in the final minutes, as Glenn Presnell kicked a field goal.

=== Week 3: Dodgers 12, Lions 10 ===
The Lions suffered their first loss of the season in a road game against the Brooklyn Dodgers at Ebbets Field.

=== Week 4: Lions 17, Redskins 7 ===
In week four, the Lions defeated the Boston Redskins 17–7 in front at Fenway Park in Boston. The Lions opened the scoring in the first quarter with a 35-yard field goal by Glenn Presnell. The Lions added a touchdown in the third quarter on a 20-yard touchdown pass from Ace Gutowsky to Dutch Clark. Both teams scored touchdowns in the fourth quarter. The Lions' final touchdown was fueled by a 40-yard run by Ernie Caddel and a final 10-yard touchdown run by Caddel.

This would be the Lions' last road win against the Redskins until the 2013 season, as they went on a 21-game road losing streak against them, one of the longest road losing streaks against a single opponent in NFL history.

=== Week 5: Packers 13, Lions 9 ===
In week five, the Lions suffered their second loss of the season, falling to the Green Bay Packers 13–9 at State Fair Park in Milwaukee. Former Oregon State tackle Tar Schwammel kicked two field goals for the Packers.

Through the first five games, Ernie Caddel was tied with Dale Burnett for the NFL scoring lead with five touchdowns and 30 points. Caddel had gained 297 yards on 39 carries for an average of 7.6 yards per carry.

=== Week 6: Lions 14, Redskins 0 ===
In the sixth game of the season, the Lions defeated the Boston Redskins 14–0 in front of 14,000 spectators in Detroit. In the first quarter, Ernie Caddel threw a 40-yard touchdown pass to Schneller for the first points of the game. The second half was played in heavy fog, "at times almost completely blotting out all action, and making necessary the use of a white ball." The Redskins drove to the Lions' nine-yard line in the third quarter, but the Lions intercepted a pass to stop the drive. The Lions scored in the fourth quarter on a one-yard plunge by Ace Gutowsky.

=== Week 7: Lions 7, Cardinals 6 ===
Detroit Lions at Chicago Cardinals

| Team | 1 | 2 | 3 | 4 | Total |
|---|---|---|---|---|---|
| • Detroit Lions | 7 | 0 | 0 | 0 | 7 |
| Chicago Cardinals | 0 | 6 | 0 | 0 | 6 |

- Date: November 3, 1935
- Location: Wrigley Field
  Chicago, IL

In week seven, the Lions narrowly defeated the Chicago Cardinals in the rain and mud at Wrigley Field. The final score was 7–6 with the difference being a successful extra point kicked by Dutch Clark after a 12-yard touchdown run by Ernie Caddel in the first quarter. The Cardinals scored a touchdown in the second quarter but missed the extra point attempt.

=== Week 8: Packers 31, Lions 7 ===
In week eight, the Lions lost for the second time in 1935 to the Green Bay Packers, this time by a score of 31–7.

=== Week 9: Lions 20, Packers 10 ===
Green Bay Packers at Detroit Lions

| Team | 1 | 2 | 3 | 4 | Total |
|---|---|---|---|---|---|
| Green Bay Packers | 0 | 0 | 0 | 0 | 0 |
| Detroit Lions | 0 | 0 | 0 | 0 | 0 |

- Date: November 18, 1935
- Location: University of Detroit Stadium
  Detroit, MI
- Referee: Kahn, Chicago (referee); Elliot, Notre Dame (umpire); Ritter, Purdue (head linesman); Meyer, Ohio State (field judge)

In week nine, the Lions and Packers met for the third time in the 1935 season. This time, the Lions came out on top 20–10. Bill Shepherd, who had been acquired by the Lions in a trade for Doug Nott on November 4, 1935, scored two touchdowns for the Lions. Ebding added another. Dutch Clark kicked two extra points. The game was attended by 14,000 spectators at University of Detroit Stadium.

=== Week 10: Lions 20, Bears 20 ===
In week 10, the Lions played the Chicago Bears to a 20–20 tie at Wrigley Field. The Bears' Bill Karr caught three touchdown passes in the game. The Lions' touchdowns were scored by Dutch Clark, Bill Shepherd and Klewicki.

=== Week 11: Lions 14, Bears 2 ===
For their 11th game, the Lions played the Bears on Thanksgiving Day in Detroit. Dutch Clark scored two touchdowns as the Lions beat the Bears 14–2. The Bears scored a safety after Buddy Parker fumbled and recovered the ball behind his own goal line.

=== Week 12: Lions 28, Dodgers 0 ===
In their final regular-season game, the Detroit Lions defeated the Brooklyn Dodgers 28–0 in front of 12,000 spectators in Detroit. The Lions scored on a field goal by Glenn Presnell, a touchdown reception by Presnell, two safeties, and touchdowns by Dutch Clark and Ace Gutowsky. They scored 16 points in the fourth quarter. The win gave the Lions the undisputed NFL Western Division title.

== Standings ==
NFL Western Division
| | W | L | T | PCT | DIV | PF | PA | STK |
|---|---|---|---|---|---|---|---|---|
| Detroit Lions | 7 | 3 | 2 | .700 | 3–2–2 | 191 | 111 | W2 |
| Green Bay Packers | 8 | 4 | 0 | .667 | 4–4 | 181 | 96 | W1 |
| Chicago Cardinals | 6 | 4 | 2 | .600 | 3–2–2 | 99 | 97 | L1 |
| Chicago Bears | 6 | 4 | 2 | .600 | 1–3–2 | 192 | 106 | W1 |

Note: Tie games were not officially counted in the standings until 1972.

== Championship Play-off ==
| Round | Date | Opponent | Result | Venue | Recap |
|---|---|---|---|---|---|
| Championship | December 15 | New York Giants | W 26–7 | University of Detroit Stadium | Recap |

NFL Championship Game: New York Giants at Detroit Lions
(1935 NFL Championship Game)

| Team | 1 | 2 | 3 | 4 | Total |
|---|---|---|---|---|---|
| New York Giants (9–3–0) | 0 | 0 | 7 | 0 | 7 |
| • Detroit Lions (7–3–2) | 13 | 0 | 0 | 13 | 26 |

- Date: December 15, 1935
- Location: University of Detroit Stadium
  Detroit, MI
- Game attendance: 12,000
- Referee: Tommy Hughitt, Buffalo (referee), Tommy Cahn, Chicago (umpire), M. J. Mayer, Ohio Wesleyan (head linesman), H. D. Robb, Pittsburgh (field judge)

The 1935 NFL Championship Game was held on December 15, 1935, at University of Detroit Stadium (some sources call it Titan Stadium) in Detroit. The game was played in a snowstorm in front of 12,000 spectators. It was the 3rd annual title game for the NFL. The champion of the Western Division was the Detroit Lions (7–3–2) and the champion of the Eastern Division was the New York Giants (9–3).

On the opening drive of the game, the Lions Glenn Presnell threw a 36-yard pass to Frank Christensen, and Ace Gutowsky threw another long pass to Ed Klewicki at the Giants' 8-yard line. Gutowsky then ran the ball into the end zone to give the Lions a 7–0 lead. The Lions scored again after Christensen intercepted a pass thrown by New York's Ed Danowski and ran it back to midfield. Three plays later, Dutch Clark ran 40 yards for a touchdown. In the fourth quarter, the Lions blocked a punt, and George Christensen recovered the ball on the Giants' 22-yard line. Ernie Caddel ran the ball in from the one-yard line for the Lions' third touchdown.

The Lions added to their lead late in the game after Parker intercepted a pass from New York quarterback (and former University of Michigan star) Harry Newman on the Giants' 45-yard line and returned it to the nine-yard line. Buddy Parker ran for the touchdown as the Lions won the championship by a final score of 26–7.

== Post-season games ==
| Game | Date | Opponent | Result |
|---|---|---|---|
| All-Star Game | January 1, 1936 | NFL All-Stars | W 33–0 |
| Post-season game | January 13, 1936 | Westwood Clubs Los Angeles | W 67–14 |
| Post-season game | January 20, 1936 | Los Angeles All-Stars | W 42–7 |
| Post-season rematch | January 26, 1936 | Green Bay Packers | W 10–3 |

=== All-Star Game: Lions 33, NFL All-Stars 0 ===
NFL All-Star Game

| Team | 1 | 2 | 3 | 4 | Total |
|---|---|---|---|---|---|
| Pro All-Stars | 0 | 0 | 0 | 0 | 0 |
| • Detroit Lions | 13 | 6 | 21 | 6 | 46 |

- Date: January 1, 1936
- Location: Denver, CO
- Game attendance: 11,000

After the NFL Championship Game, the Lions played a game against an NFL All-Star team on January 1, 1936. The game was attended by 11,000 spectators and marked the first NFL game to be played in Denver, Colorado. The Lions scored five touchdowns, including three in the third period, for a 33–0 victory.

== Roster ==
1935 Detroit Lions final roster
| Backs: 1 Ernie Caddel RB/CB; 2 Frank Christensen RB/CB/S; 7 Dutch Clark RB/CB/S/K; 5 Ace Gutowsky FB/LB; 6 Tony Kaska FB/LB; 4 Buddy Parker FB/LB; 3 Glenn Presnell RB/CB/S/K; 9 Bill Shepherd FB/LB; 8 Pug Vaughan RB/CB/S | Ends: 11 Harry Ebding; 10 Ed Klewicki; 27 Butch Morse; 12 John Schneller | Linemen/Linebackers: 14 George Christensen T/DT; 20 Ox Emerson G/DG; 22 Tom Hupke; 16 Jack Johnson T/DT; 21 Sam Knox G/DG; 19 Regis Monahan G/DG; 17 Clare Randolph C/LB; 25 Red Stacy T/DT; 23 Jim Steen T/DT; 18 Elmer Ward C/LB; rookies in italics |

== Detroit: "City of Champions" ==
When the Lions won the 1935 NFL Championship Game, the City of Detroit was mired in the Great Depression, which had hit Detroit and its industries particularly hard. But with the success of the Lions and other Detroit athletes in 1935, Detroit's luck appeared to be changing, as the City was dubbed the "City of Champions." The Detroit Tigers also won the 1935 World Series, and the Detroit Red Wings won the 1935–36 Stanley Cup championship. Detroit's "champions" included Detroit's "Brown Bomber," Joe Louis, the heavyweight boxing champion; native Detroiter Gar Wood who was the champion of unlimited powerboat racing and the first man to go 100 miles per hour on water; Eddie "the Midnight Express" Tolan, a black Detroiter who won gold medals in the 100- and 200-meter races at the 1932 Summer Olympics.

== Statistical leaders ==
=== Rushing ===
| Player | GP | Att | Net Yards | Yds/Att | TD |
| Ernie Caddel | 12 | 87 | 450 | 5.2 | 6 |
| Dutch Clark | 12 | 102 | 427 | 3.6 | 4 |
| Ace Gutowsky | 9 | 59 | 276 | 2.9 | 2 |
| Glenn Presnell | 12 | 71 | 225 | 3.2 | 0 |
| Buddy Parker | 11 | 59 | 156 | 2.6 | 0 |
| Bill Shepherd | 5 | 54 | 140 | 2.6 | 3 |

=== Passing ===
| Player | GP | Att | Comp | Int | Comp % | Yds | Yds/Comp | TD |
| Glenn Presnell | 12 | 45 | 15 | 6 | 33.3 | 193 | 12.9 | 0 |
| Ernie Caddel | 12 | 6 | 4 | 1 | 66.6 | 169 | 42.3 | 2 |
| Dutch Clark | 12 | 26 | 11 | 4 | 42.3 | 133 | 12.1 | 2 |
| Pug Vaughan | 7 | 15 | 7 | 2 | 46.7 | 104 | 14.9 | 2 |
| Bill Shepherd | 5 | 9 | 7 | 0 | 77.8 | 99 | 14.1 | 1 |
| Ace Gutowsky | 12 | 9 | 5 | 1 | 55.6 | 95 | 19.0 | 2 |
| Frank Christensen | 12 | 21 | 6 | 3 | 28.6 | 92 | 15.3 | 0 |

=== Receiving ===
| Player | GP | Recp | Yds | Yds/Recp | TD |
| Ernie Caddel | 12 | 10 | 171 | 17.1 | 0 |
| John Schneller | 12 | 7 | 149 | 21.3 | 2 |
| Harry Ebding | 11 | 8 | 128 | 16.0 | 1 |
| Dutch Clark | 12 | 9 | 124 | 13.8 | 2 |
| Ed Klewicki | 11 | 4 | 112 | 28.0 | 2 |
| Glenn Presnell | 12 | 3 | 73 | 24.3 | 1 |

=== Scoring ===
| Player | GP | Rush TD | Recv TD | PR TD | Total TD | FG | XPM | Points |
| Dutch Clark | 12 | 4 | 2 | 0 | 6 | 1 | 16 | 55 |
| Ernie Caddel | 12 | 6 | 0 | 0 | 6 | 0 | 0 | 36 |
| Glenn Presnell | 12 | 0 | 1 | 1 | 2 | 4 | 4 | 28 |
| Bill Shepherd | 5 | 3 | 0 | 0 | 3 | 0 | 0 | 18 |

== Awards and records ==
- Ernie Cadell

Led NFL in all-purpose yards and yards from scrimmage (621)
Led NFL in rushing touchdowns (6)
Led NFL in yards per rushing attempt (5.2)
Led NFL in yards per touch (6.4)
Tied for NFL lead in rushing/receiving touchdowns (6)
2nd in NFL in rushing yards (450)

- Dutch Clark

Led NFL in points scored (55)
Tied for NFL lead in extra points made (16)
Tied for NFL lead in rushing/receiving touchdowns (6)
2nd in NFL in all-purpose yards (551)

- Glenn Presnell

Tied for NFL lead in punt return touchdowns (1)
