= Ace Gutowsky =

American football player (1909–1976)

- Gutowsky in 1936

No. 5, 55, 11
- Positions: Fullback, linebacker

Personal information
- Born: August 2, 1909; Komolty, Oklahoma, U.S.
- Died: December 4, 1976 (aged 67); Oklahoma City, Oklahoma, U.S.
- Listed height: 5 ft 11 in (1.80 m)
- Listed weight: 201 lb (91 kg)

Career information
- College: Oklahoma City

Career history
- Portsmouth Spartans / Detroit Lions (1932–1938); Brooklyn Dodgers (1939)

Awards and highlights
- NFL champion (1935)

Career statistics
- Rushing yards: 3,279
- Yards per carry: 3.6
- Rushing touchdowns: 20
- Stats at Pro Football Reference

LeRoy Erwin "Ace" Gutowsky (August 2, 1909 – December 4, 1976) was an American professional American football fullback. He played professional football for eight years from 1932 to 1939 and set the NFL career rushing record in October 1939. He held the Detroit Lions' career and single-season rushing records until the 1960s.

== Early life ==
Gutowsky was descended from ethnic German colonists in Ukraine via Poland. His father, Assaph Gutowsky came to the USA with several of his brothers in 1902. He met and married Augusta Ludwig and they settled in Oklahoma. He was raised in Kingfisher, OK. Gutowsky learned to play football in the sandlots of Kingfisher and became an outstanding athlete at Kingfisher High School. Pappy Waldorf recruited him to play football at Oklahoma City University. With Waldorf as coach and Gutowsky in the backfield, the Oklahoma City Goldbugs rose to success in football. Former teammate Leo Higbie recalled, "Lynn Waldorf got OCU's football program really going in 1927 when he brought the great Ace Gutowsky of Kingfisher to the school." With Gutowsky in the backfield, the Goldbugs lost only one game in the first two years of the 1930s.

== Professional career ==
Gutowsky played eight years of professional football in the National Football League for the Portsmouth Spartans (1932–1933), Detroit Lions (1934–1938) and Brooklyn Dodgers (1939). At 5 ft 11 in (1.80 m) and 201 pounds (91 kg), Gutowsky played principally at the fullback position. As a two-way player, Gutowsky's duties on defense were those which in modern football would be associated with a linebacker or safety.

Playing for the Portsmouth Spartans in 1932, Gutowsky was tripped by coaching legend George Halas in a championship game against the Chicago Bears. With the Bears leading and four minutes left in the game, Gutowsky took a kickoff and began returning the ball along the sideline. Halas "stuck out his foot and tripped Gutowsky as he ran past with the ball." The officials didn't notice, but Portsmouth coach Potsy Clark "went off like a roman candle" and told Halas he was playing the game under protest. Halas reportedly responded by yelling, "Protest this," while "saluting Clark with a single finger."

Gutowsky enjoyed his greatest success as a member of the Detroit Lions from 1934 to 1938. In 1934, he carried the ball 146 times for the Lions, the highest number of carries by any player during the 1934 NFL season. Gutowsky was also one of the leaders on a defense that ran seven straight shutouts and gave up only 59 points in 13 games. The following year, he was a member of the 1935 Detroit Lions team that defeated the New York Giants in the 1935 NFL Championship Game. In the mid-1930s, the Lions' backfield with Gutowsky, Dutch Clark and Ernie Caddel became known as the "Infantry Attack." While Clark was considered the "flashier" back, Gutowsky was regarded as the "workhorse" and "the one they turned to when the ball was near the goal line." Teammate Glenn Presnell later recalled that Gutowsky was "a hard line plunger."

In 1936, the Lions rushed for 2,885 yards, a mark that stood as the NFL single-season team rushing record until 1972. Gutowsky led the NFL that year with 857 yards from scrimmage, ranking ahead of teammate Dutch Clark and future Hall of Fame inductees Bronko Nagurski and Don Hutson. He also ranked second in the NFL behind Tuffy Leemans in rushing attempts (191), rushing yards (827), and rushing yards per game (68.9). His six rushing touchdowns in 1936 was exceeded only by his teammate Dutch Clark. His 827 rushing yards was the Lions' single-single season rushing record until 1960, when Nick Pietrosante rushed for 872 yards.

Gutowsky finished his playing career in 1939 with the Brooklyn Dodgers football team. On October 22, 1939, in a 23–14 victory over the Philadelphia Eagles, Gutowsky broke Cliff Battles' NFL career rushing record. While his NFL rushing record was short-lived, he continued to hold the Lions' career rushing record into the 1960s. When he concluded his career in the NFL, Gutowsky, Clarke Hinkle and Bronko Nagurski were rated as "the greatest fullbacks ever to play professional football."

== Bridge accomplishments ==
Gutowsky became a champion bridge player, winning the 1951 Men's Board-a-Match Teams. The American Contract Bridge Association gave him the "life master" ranking, making him the first Oklahoman to achieve the highest ranking in bridge.

=== Wins ===
- North American Bridge Championships (1)
  - Mitchell Board-a-Match Teams (1) 1951

== Later life ==
Gutowsky's father, Assaph "Ace" Gutowsky, was in the oil business. He became convinced that a major petroleum deposit lay under the area north of Oklahoma City and scouted the area extensively. In 1942 or 1943, Gutowsky's father discovered an oil field at West Edmond, Oklahoma, that was estimated at 117,000,000 barrels. Gutowsky's father discovered the oil field using a "doodlebug," a "homemade divining rod" and "struck it rich" as several major oil companies bought leases from him. By 1944, Time magazine called the West Edmond field the "greatest concentration of rotary drilling rigs in the world."

After serving in the U.S. Army during World War II, Gutowsky went into the oil business with his father. He also served as the line coach for Oklahoma City University in the late 1940s.

Gutwosky died of cancer in December 1976 at Mercy Hospital, Oklahoma City, Oklahoma. He was buried in the Kingfisher Cemetery.
