= Joe F. Carr Trophy =

1938: NFL's 1st MVP (Gruen Trophy)

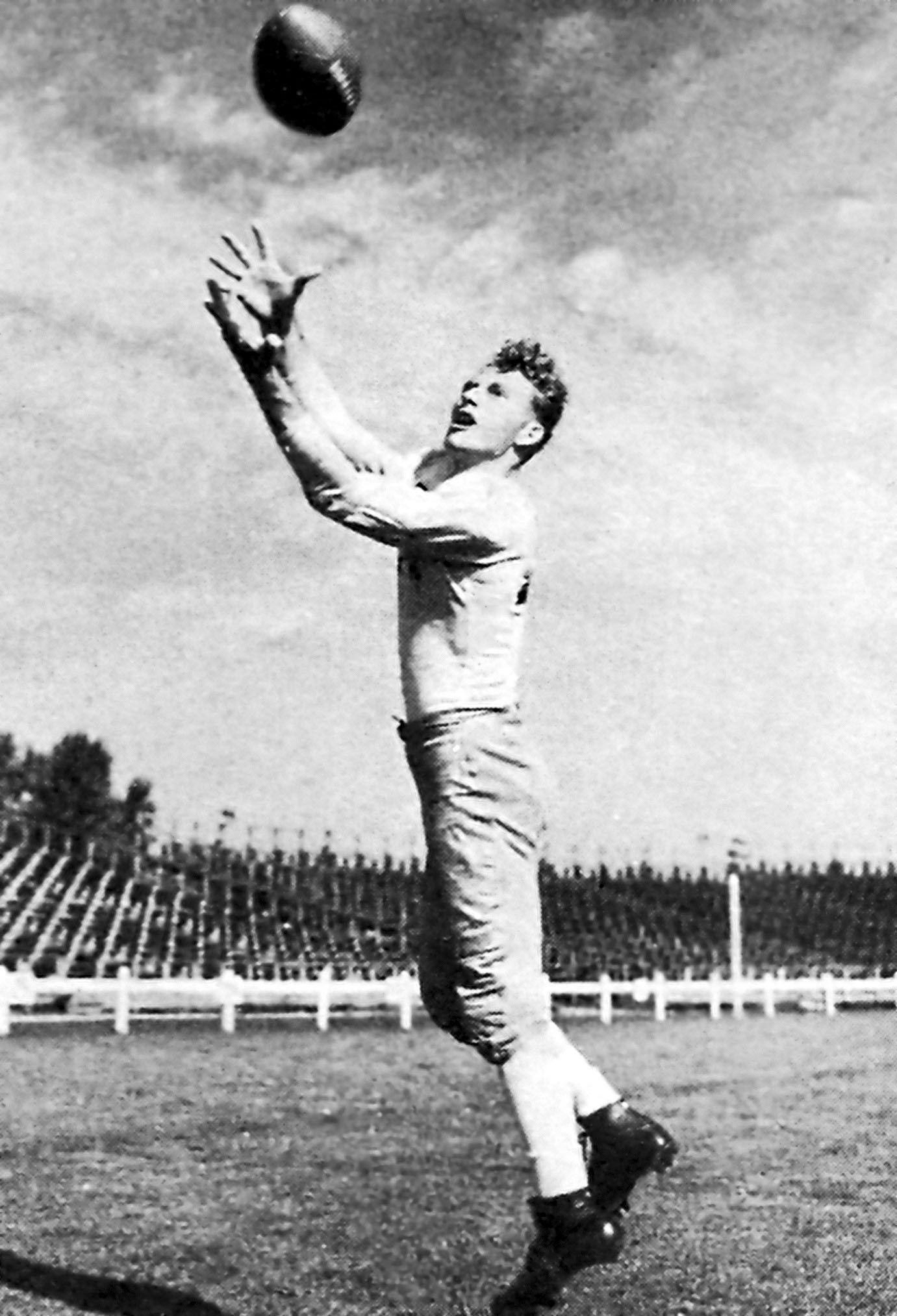
Don Hutson, the first multiple-time NFL MVP

The Joe F. Carr Trophy was the first award given in the National Football League (NFL) to recognize a most valuable player for each season. It was first awarded in 1938, known then as the Gruen Trophy, and renamed in 1939 in honor of NFL commissioner Joseph Carr. The Gruen Trophy, sponsored by Gruen Watch Co., was first awarded in 1937 to Dutch Clark of the Detroit Lions. However, both contemporary and modern sources consider the 1938 award the first retroactive Joe F. Carr Trophy, and thus the first NFL MVP award. Players were chosen by a panel of sportswriters who distributed first and second place votes. It was awarded until the 1946 season, and it remains the only MVP award the NFL has officially sanctioned.

Season	Player	Team	Position	Refs
1938	Mel Hein	New York Giants	C, LB	
1939	Parker Hall	Cleveland Rams	QB, HB	
1940	Ace Parker	Brooklyn Dodgers	QB, HB	
1941	Don Hutson	Green Bay Packers	End	
1942	Don Hutson (2)	Green Bay Packers	End	
1943	Sid Luckman	Chicago Bears	QB	
1944	Frank Sinkwich	Detroit Lions	HB	
1945	Bob Waterfield	Cleveland Rams	QB	
1946	Bill Dudley	Pittsburgh Steelers	HB	

== Multiple-time winners ==
List of multiple-time winners
Awards	Player	Team	Years	Hall of Fame induction
2	Don Hutson	Green Bay Packers	1941, 1942	1951

== See also ==
- NFL Most Valuable Player Award for an overview of NFL MVP awards, both past and present
- List of NFL awards
