= Ed Klewicki =

American football player (1912–1997)

- Klewicki in 1936

No. 10
- Position: End

Personal information
- Born: May 5, 1912; Pittsburgh, Pennsylvania, U.S.
- Died: July 20, 1997 (aged 85); East Lansing, Michigan, U.S.
- Listed height: 5 ft 10 in (1.78 m)
- Listed weight: 209 lb (95 kg)

Career information
- High school: Hamtramck (MI)
- College: Michigan State

Career history
- Detroit Lions (1935–1938)

Awards and highlights
- NFL champion (1935)

Career statistics
- Games played: 43
- Starts: 34
- Yards receiving: 393 (20.7 average)
- Yards rushing: 129 (6.4 average)
- Touchdowns: 2
- Stats at Pro Football Reference

Edward Leonard Klewicki (May 6, 1912 – July 20, 1997) was an American football player who played professionally with the Detroit Lions of the National Football League (NFL), helping them to win the 1935 NFL Championship.

Klewicki was inducted to the National Polish-American Sports Hall of Fame in 1982.

== Early life ==
Ed Klewicki was born in Pittsburgh and moved to Hamtramck, Michigan with his family at a young age. At the time, Hamtramck was an enclave of Polish immigrants in the Detroit area.

He attended Hamtramck High School, where he was the catcher on the school's first championship baseball team and starred in the backfield for the football team.

In 1929 Klewicki received his school's top graduation honor for combining accomplishment in scholarship, athletics, and citizenship.

== College career ==
Klewicki moved on the play college football at Michigan State College (today's Michigan State University). His college coach, Charles Bachman, rated Klewicki as the best defensive end he had ever coached. He was also competent on the offensive side of the ball, pulling down five passes for touchdowns during his 1934 season in helping lead the team to a 9–1 record.

The New York Sun selected him to the second-team 1934 College Football All-America Team, and he was named MVP of the 1934 Michigan State Spartans football team.

== Professional career ==
In 1935, Klewicki signed a pro contract with the Detroit Lions and was a member of the NFL's World Championship team that season, starting 7 games at left end.

Klewicki played a key role in the Detroit Lions' 26–7 triumph over the New York Giants for the National Football League crown on a raw, gloomy afternoon at the University of Detroit Stadium before 15,000 fans on December 19, 1935. In the early minutes of play, Lions' coach Potsy Clark decided to surprise the Giants with a shotgun offense.

Glenn Presnell, the Lions' passer, fired a long pass intended for Klewicki, but the ball hit New York Giants' Ed Danowski's chest. The ball squirted high in the air, but Klewicki reached out quickly, gathered the ball in and put the Lions into scoring position from the two-yard line. Ace Gutowsky plunged for a touchdown, Presnell kicked the extra point and the Lions led 7–0 on their way to the championship.

He continued to play football with the Lions through the 1938 season.

== Life after football ==
Klewicki earned a B.S. degree from Michigan State and attended Purdue University for post-graduate work.

He served in a number of positions including president of the Michigan State Varsity Alumni for two years as well as secretary for the same club for four years. In addition, he served as president of the Detroit Lions Alumni and the president of the Lansing Country Club.

== Death and legacy ==
Klewicki died July 20, 1997, at East Lansing, Michigan. He was 85 years old at the time of his death.

Klewicki was inducted into the National Polish-American Sports Hall of Fame in 1982.
