= Dutch Clark =

American football player and coach (1906–1978)

- Photo from The Pueblo Chieftain

No. 19, 12, 7
- Position: Back

Personal information
- Born: October 11, 1906; Fowler, Colorado, U.S.
- Died: August 5, 1978 (aged 71); Cañon City, Colorado, U.S.
- Listed height: 6 ft 0 in (1.83 m)
- Listed weight: 185 lb (84 kg)

Career information
- High school: Central (Pueblo, Colorado)
- College: Colorado College (1927–1929)

Career history

Playing
- Portsmouth Spartans / Detroit Lions (1931–1932; 1934–1938)

Coaching
- Colorado College (1930) Assistant coach; Colorado Mines (1933) Head coach; Detroit Lions (1937–1938) Head coach; Cleveland Rams (1939–1942) Head coach; Seattle Bombers (1944) Head coach; Los Angeles Dons (1949) Backfield coach; Detroit Titans (1950) Assistant coach; Detroit Titans (1951–1953) Head coach

Operations
- Detroit Lions (1936–1938) General manager; Cleveland Rams (1939–1940) General manager; Detroit Titans (1951–1954) Athletic director

Awards and highlights
- As a player: NFL champion (1935); 6× First-team All-Pro (1931, 1932, 1934–1937); 3× NFL rushing touchdowns leader (1934, 1936, 1937); 3× NFL scoring leader (1932, 1935, 1936); NFL 1930s All-Decade Team; NFL 75th Anniversary All-Time Team; NFL 100th Anniversary All-Time Team; Pride of the Lions; Detroit Lions 75th Anniversary Team; Detroit Lions All-Time Team; Detroit Lions No. 7 retired; First-team All-American (1928)

Career statistics
- TD–INT: 11–26
- Passing yards: 1,507
- Rushing yards: 2,772
- Rushing touchdowns: 36
- Receptions: 28
- Receiving yards: 341
- Receiving touchdowns: 6
- Points scored: 369
- Stats at Pro Football Reference

Head coaching record
- Career: NFL: 30–34–2 (.470); College: 14–22 (.389)
- Coaching profile at Pro Football Reference
- Executive profile at Pro Football Reference
- Pro Football Hall of Fame
- College Football Hall of Fame

Earl Harry "Dutch" Clark (October 11, 1906 – August 5, 1978), sometimes also known as "the Flying Dutchman" and "the Old Master", was an American football player and coach, basketball player and coach, and university athletic director. He gained his greatest acclaim as a football player and was inducted into the College Football Hall of Fame with its inaugural class in 1951 and the Pro Football Hall of Fame with its inaugural class in 1963. He was also named in 1969 to the NFL 1930s All-Decade Team and was the first player to have his jersey (No. 7) retired by the Detroit Lions.

Born in Colorado, Clark attended Colorado College where he played football, basketball, and baseball, and also competed in track and field in the hammer throw. During the 1928 football season, he rushed for 1,349 yards, scored 103 points, and became the first player from Colorado to receive first-team All-American honors. After graduating in 1930, he remained at Colorado College as the head basketball coach and assistant football coach.

Clark played professionally in the National Football League (NFL) with the Portsmouth Spartans / Detroit Lions for 7 seasons from 1931 to 1938. He was selected as the first-team All-Pro quarterback six times, was named by the United Press (UP) as the best player in the NFL in both 1935 and 1936, led the Lions to the 1935 NFL championship, and led the NFL in total offense in 1934 and scoring in 1932, 1935, and 1936. In his final two seasons with the Lions, he also served as the team's head coach. In 1940, he was selected by the Associated Press (AP) as the outstanding football player of the 1930s.

Clark was the head coach at the Colorado School of Mines (1933) and with the Cleveland Rams (NFL, 1939–1942) and Seattle Bombers (American Football League, 1944), an assistant coach with the Los Angeles Dons (All-America Football Conference, 1949) and University of Detroit Titans (1950), and head coach and athletic director for the University of Detroit (1951–1953).

== Early life ==
Clark was born in the town of Fowler in Otero County, Colorado, in 1906. He was the son of Harry J. Clark (1874–1924), a Michigan native, and Mary Etta (Lackey) Clark (1876–1969), a North Carolina native. Clark had an older sister, Mabel May (1899–1990), two older brothers, Carl (1901–1927) and Fred (1903–1942), and a younger sister, Pearl (1919–2003). As of 1910, the family lived in La Junta, Otero County, where the father was a farmer. In 1917, when Dutch was 10 years old, the family moved approximately 60 miles to the west to Pueblo, where the father was employed as a locomotive fireman on a steam railroad.

Clark attended Pueblo's Central High School. As a sophomore in the 1923–24 academic year, he was a member of the football team, captain of the basketball team, and was voted the most popular man in the school.

As a junior during the 1924–1925 academic year, Clark was voted as the class president. He was also regarded as "the best all-around athlete in the state." Playing at fullback for the football team, he helped Central win the 1924 South Central League championship and was named to the all-state team. He was named captain of the basketball team for the second consecutive year, played at the center position, and was selected as an all-conference player.

According to an account published in 1980, Clark earned all-state honors in football and basketball and set South Central League track & field records in the discus and high hurdles. Baseball was his "weak" sport, on account of impaired vision in his left eye. He earned 16 letters at Central High and graduated in 1926.

== Colorado College ==
In the fall of 1926, Clark enrolled at the Colorado College in Colorado Springs. He played football for four years and was team captain as a senior. He also played basketball for four years and was team captain as both a junior and a senior. He also competed in track all four years and in baseball as a senior.

During the 1928 season, Clark averaged 10 yards every time he carried the ball. He rushed for 1,349 yards on 135 carries and scored 103 of the team's 203 points. At the end of the 1928 season, he was selected by the Associated Press as the first-team quarterback on the 1928 College Football All-America Team. He was the first All-American football player from any of Colorado's colleges and universities.

Clark graduated from Colorado College in June 1930 with a Bachelor of Arts degree in biology. After graduating, Clark remained at Colorado College during the 1930–1931 academic year as an assistant football coach and head basketball coach.

== NFL playing career ==
=== Portsmouth Spartans ===
In May 1931, Clark was granted a leave of absence from his coaching responsibilities at Colorado College to allow him to play for the Portsmouth Spartans in the National Football League (NFL), with the understanding that he would return to coach the school's basketball team when the Spartans' season was over. The Spartans compiled an 11–3 record in 1931, good for second place in the NFL. Clark appeared in 11 games and was the team's leading scorer with 60 points on nine touchdowns and six extra points. He ranked third in the NFL in scoring and was selected as the first-team All-Pro quarterback. Clark was actually the leading scorer in the NFL when he secured permission to leave the team early to resume his coaching responsibilities with the Colorado College basketball team.

Clark returned to the Spartans in the fall of 1932 and led the team to a 6–2–4 record and third place in the NFL. Clark led the NFL with 581 rushing yards; he also led the league with 55 points scored, 10 extra points, and three field goals. For the second consecutive year, he was selected as the first-team All-Pro quarterback. In December 1932, United Press sportswriter George Kirksey rated Clark as the greatest football player of the past 10 years.

Despite his success during the 1931 and 1932 NFL seasons, Clark returned to Colorado College as the school's head basketball coach at the end of the 1932 season. Then, in March 1933, he surprised followers of the professional game by announcing that he would not return to the NFL in 1933, having elected instead to serve as the head football coach for the Colorado School of Mines.

=== Detroit Lions ===
Clark signed with the Detroit Lions in May 1934 and joined the team for training camp at the end of August. (The Portsmouth Spartans moved to Detroit and became the Lions in 1934.)

"Coach" Clark on the cover of a 1938 Detroit Lions game program.

Clark was the quarterback for the 1934 Detroit Lions team that compiled a 10–3 record and finished in second place in the NFL West behind the undefeated Chicago Bears. Clark led the NFL in 1934 with 1,146 yards of total offense and eight rushing touchdowns and ranked among the leaders with 73 points scored (second), 763 rushing yards (third), and 383 passing yards (fourth). At the end of the 1934 season, Clark was selected as the first-team All-Pro quarterback for the third time in three years playing in the NFL.

In August 1935, Clark was selected by his Detroit teammates as the team captain without a dissenting vote. As quarterback and captain, Clark led the 1935 Detroit Lions to the NFL championship. Clark led the NFL with 55 points scored and 16 extra points. Clark later cited the Lions' 13–0 victory over the Bears on Thanksgiving Day as his most memorable game. In that game, Clark scored both Detroit touchdowns, the first on a pass from Bill Shepherd and the second when he rolled out on a flanker play and took a lateral pass 21 yards into the end zone. In the 1935 NFL Championship Game, Clark had "a sensational 42-yard dash" for a touchdown in the second quarter, as the Lions defeated the New York Giants, 26–7.

On January 1, 1936, Clark led the Lions to a 33–0 victory over an all-star team in the first professional football game played in Denver. Clark scored two touchdowns in the game, including a 52-yard touchdown run.

After the 1935 season, Clark was again selected as the first-team All Pro quarterback; the United Press also selected him as the best player in the NFL, calling him the "keenest football strategist", the "most dangerous one-man threat", "a fine drop-kicker and a deadly tackler." The Los Angeles Times noted that Clark "has been acclaimed as the greatest back in the history of the game." Another writer said he had "the nimblest legs in football" and called him the modern back who comes "nearest to perfection"." Red Grange called Clark "the hardest man in football to tackle" and noted: "His change of pace fools the best tacklers." Lions' head coach Potsy Clark cited intelligence and leadership as the factors that separated Clark from others:

For one thing he knows what plays to call. He is one of the most intelligent men who ever played football. He knows the game thoroughly. He rarely makes a mistake. But his main asset is ability to gain the confidence of players. He makes them absolutely believe in him. They never question any play he calls, they regard him as infallible. This confidence is not misplaced. I have never known 'Dutch' to criticize any player. Any time a play goes wrong he takes the entire blame, regardless of who is responsible."

In February 1936, Clark announced that, despite the successful 1935 season, he might quit professional football. He noted that time had slowed him, and he preferred pursuing a business career in his hometown of Pueblo, Colorado. He took a job as the general manager of the Colorado State Fair, but wrote to the Lions in June advising that he had been granted a leave of absence to rejoin the club in August, with time to prepare for the Chicago College All-Star Game set for September 1.

During the 1936 NFL season, Clark led the Lions to an 8–4 record, third-best in the NFL. For the third time in his career, Clark led the NFL in scoring with 73 points, Clark's tally coming on seven touchdowns, 19 extra points, and four field goals. He ranked second in the league with 1,095 yards of total offense. He also ranked among the NFL's leaders with 628 rushing yards (third) and 467 passing yards (sixth). For the fifth time in five years of NFL play, he was selected as the first-team All-Pro quarterback. The United Press also selected Clark as the most valuable player in the NFL, citing his talents as "the smartest quarterback in football" and his multiple talents as ball carrier, passer, drop-kicker, and defensive player.

At the end of the 1936 season, Clark announced that he intended to pursue a coaching position for the 1937 season. Three weeks after Clark's announcement, the Lions' head coach Potsy Clark resigned to accept the head coaching job with the Brooklyn Dodgers. Dutch Clark was signed the next day as the Lions' head coach, adding coaching duties to his pre-existing duties as player and team captain.

During the 1937 season, Clark finished among the NFL leaders with five rushing touchdowns (first), 4.9 yards per rushing attempt (second), 468 rushing yards (fourth), and 45 points scored (fourth). For the Lions' 1937 Thanksgiving Day game against the Bears, the team held a "Dutch Clark Day". Before a capacity crowd of 26,000, the Lions presented Clark with an automobile, and his wife received a platinum wristwatch set with diamonds. After the game, a punishing loss, Clark announced his retirement as a player, saying: "I'm too old. Look how long it takes me to get undressed." Tod Rockwell of the Detroit Free Press wrote that, as Clark announced his retirement, he was "bruised from head to foot", his left hand was "swollen double its normal size", there were "welts on his legs, a lump over one eye, and a belt on the mouth had split open his lips in several places."

After the 1937 season, Clark was named the first-team All-Pro quarterback for the sixth time. In polling of 27 sports editors in NFL cities, Clark led all other players with 25 first-team votes.

In May 1938, Clark announced that he was open to playing during the 1938 season, though he intended to play "as little as possible," and not at all if the Lions could secure the services of a satisfactory quarterback. Bill Shepherd took over as the club's starting quarterback in 1938, and Clark appeared only briefly in six games, carrying the ball seven times and completing six of 12 passes.

During his eight years as a player in the NFL, Clark appeared in 75 games, totaled 2,772 rushing yards, 1,507 passing yards, and 341 receiving yards, scored 42 touchdowns, kicked 72 extra points and 15 field goals, and totaled 369 points scored. He held the NFL's career scoring record at the time of his retirement.

== Coaching career ==
=== Colorado School of Mines ===
In March 1933, Clark was hired as head football coach for the Colorado School of Mines football team. He led the team to a 1–5 record during the 1933 college football season. He resigned his post in March 1934 in order to return to the NFL with the Detroit Lions.

=== Detroit Lions ===
Clark was player-coach with the Lions during the 1937 and 1938 seasons. Under his leadership, the Lions compiled identical 7–4 records and finished in second place in the NFL's West Division in both years.

=== Cleveland Rams ===
In December 1938, Clark resigned as head coach of the Lions and signed a two-year contract as head coach of the Cleveland Rams. During the 1939 season, Clark sought permission to play for the Rams, but the NFL ruled that the Lions held rights to him as a player, rejected the Rams' request to declare Clark a free agent, and held that the Rams must strike a deal with the Lions to allow Clark to play. The Lions expressed a willingness to work something out but only if the Rams sent a player to the Lions in exchange. No deal was reached, and Clark's role with the Rams in 1939 was limited to coaching. In January 1940, after the Lions were sold to new owners, the club agreed to grant Clark a players' release if he submitted a request.

As head coach, Clark led the Rams to records of 5–5–1 in 1939, 4–6–1 in 1940, 2–9 in 1941, and 5–6 in 1942.

In March 1943, Clark announced that he would not seek renewal of his contract as coach of the Rams.

=== Military service and business career ===
After retiring from the Rams, Clark returned to Pueblo, Colorado, where he took a job selling insurance. In February 1944, Clark was accepted for limited service in the United States Army. After the war, Clark continued to work in the insurance business and acquired an ownership interest in a wine merchant in Colorado Springs.

=== Seattle Bombers ===
In July 1944, Clark signed as coach of the Seattle team in the newly formed American Football League (not to be confused with the more successful American Football League of the 1960s which is now the basis of the NFL's American Football Conference) of the Pacific Coast. He coached the Seattle Bombers to a 5–5–1 record in the league's only season.

=== Los Angeles Dons ===
In March 1949, Clark was hired as backfield coach for the Los Angeles Dons of the All-America Football Conference. In December 1949, after one season with the Dons (which folded after the season, with some of the other AAFC teams merging into the NFL), Clark accepted a job offer to become backfield coach with the Chicago Cardinals for the 1950 season, but that opportunity was lost days later when Buddy Parker resigned as the Cardinals' head coach.

=== University of Detroit ===
In March 1950, Clark was hired as an assistant coach of the University of Detroit Titans football team. The 1950 Detroit Titans football team, with Clark as backfield coach, compiled a 6–3–1 record. After the 1950 season, Chuck Baer resigned as the school's head football coach. In February 1951, Clark was promoted to the dual role of head football coach and athletic director at the University of Detroit. Despite leading the Titans to records of 4–7 and 3–6 in 1951 and 1952, respectively, Clark was selected by his fellow Missouri Valley Conference (MVC) coaches as coach of the year at the end of the 1952 season. In 1953, he led the Titans to a 6–4 record and a tie with Oklahoma A&M for the MVC championship.

At the end of December 1953, Clark resigned as the University of Detroit's head football coach to pursue a business opportunity in Detroit. He remain as athletic director through the end of February 1954 when his contract expired.

== Legacy and honors ==
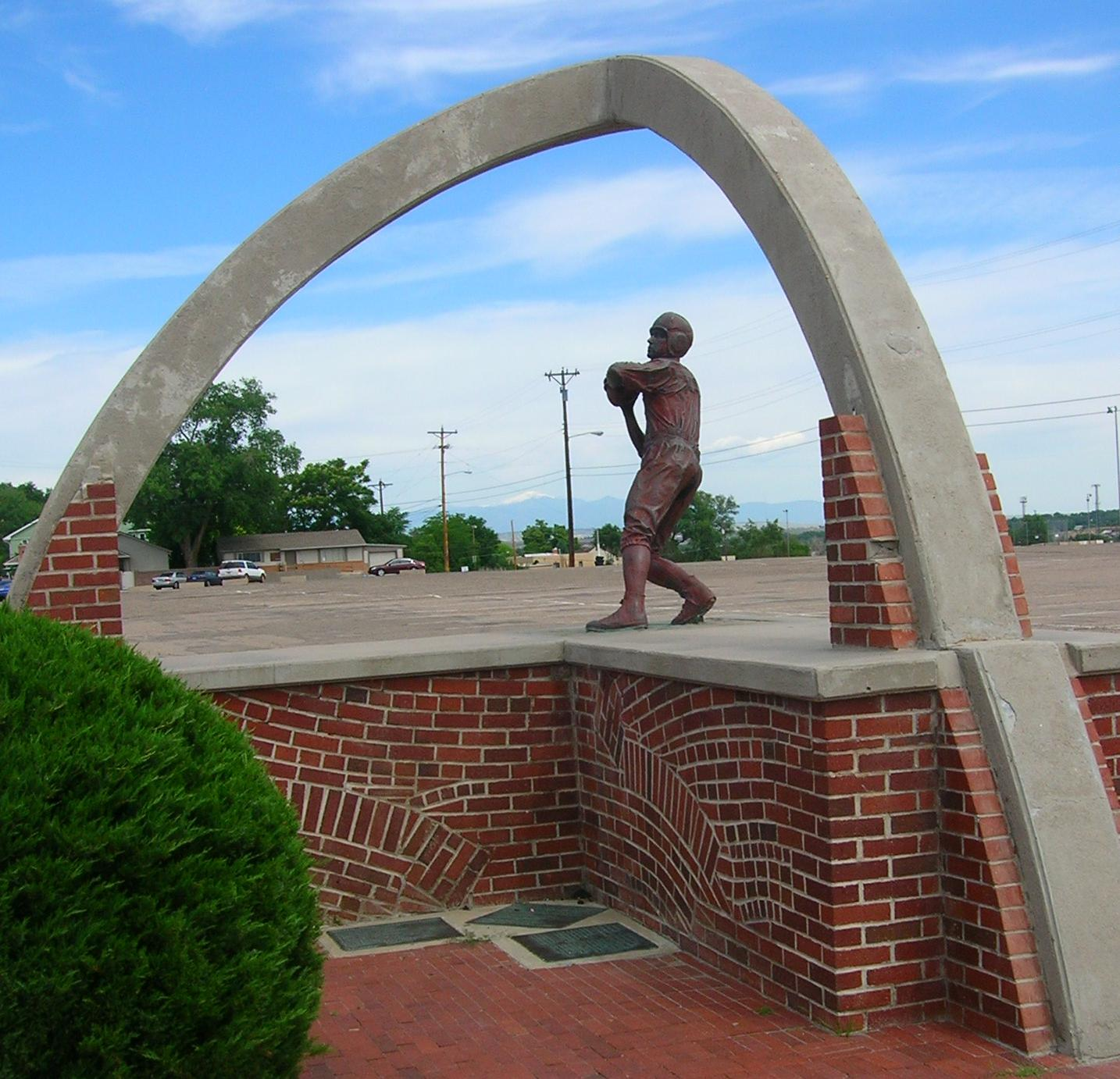
Entrance to Dutch Clark Stadium in Pueblo, Colorado, with Pikes Peak in the distant background.

Clark has received numerous honors for his contributions to the sport. His honors include the following:

- In January 1940, the Associated Press (AP) selected Clark as "Football's Man of the Decade", the outstanding football player of the 1930s, beating out competitors such as Don Hutson, Sammy Baugh, and Mel Hein. In selecting Clark, the AP noted: "He could do everything. An accurate punter, a great drop-kicker, a sure tackler and a skillful, hard blocker, he was also one of the National league's better passers and had few equals as a runner. As a quarterback, he was virtually a coach on the field. Clark was not only fast but ran with a deceptive change of pace."
- In August 1950, Clark was one of 24 players selected as charter inductees into the Helms Athletic Foundation's Professional Football Hall of Fame.
- In November 1951, Clark was one of 52 inaugural inductees into the National Football Foundation's Football Hall of Fame (later renamed the College Football Hall of Fame).
- In May 1959, Clark was inducted into the Michigan Sports Hall of Fame.
- In January 1963, Clark was selected as one of the 17 inaugural inductees into the Pro Football Hall of Fame. At the time of the announcement, Clark called it his greatest thrill since being selected as an All-American in 1928.
- In March 1965, Clark was one of three inaugural inductees (along with Byron White and Jack Dempsey) into the Colorado Sports Hall of Fame.
- In August 1969, Clark was named to the NFL 1930s All-Decade Team.
- In October 1973, Clark was selected as one of two inaugural inductees into the Greater Pueblo Sports Association's Hall of Fame.
- In 1980, the Pueblo Public School Stadium was renamed Earl "Dutch" Clark Stadium. A statue of Clark by the Latka Studios was added in 1985.
- In 1995, Clark was inducted posthumously, and as one of the inaugural inductees, into the Colorado College Athletic Hall of Fame. He was also inducted into the National High School Hall of Fame that same year.
- In November 2009, Clark was one of 12 former Detroit Lions to be included in the club's "Pride of the Lions" charter class.
- In November 2019, Clark was among 12 running backs named to the NFL 100th Anniversary All-Time Team.

== Family and later years ==
In June 1930, Clark received his degree from Colorado College. Later the same day, he was married to Dorothy Schrader, a school teacher and Clark's high school sweetheart, in a ceremony at Pueblo, Colorado. They had a son, Earl Clark Jr., born in December 1934.

Clark's wife, Dorothy, died suddenly in May 1952 as the result of a stroke at age 43. In January 1955, Clark was remarried to Ruth Jane Lowther, the widow of former Detroit Lions player Jackie Lowther. In December of that year, their son, Timothy Clark was born. Clark also became stepfather to his second wife's two sons, Charles and Thomas Lowther, ages nine and five.

After retiring from football in the 1950s, Clark lived in Royal Oak, Michigan, and worked as a sales representative for an engineering firm.

In 1975, Clark and his second wife, Ruth Jane, moved to Canon City, Colorado. In August 1978, Clark died from cancer at age 71 at his home in Canon City. He was buried at Lakeside Cemetery in Canon City.

== Head coaching record ==
=== College football ===
Year	Team	Overall	Conference	Standing	Bowl/playoffs
Colorado Mines Orediggers (Rocky Mountain Conference) (1933)
1933	Colorado Mines	1–5	1–5	10th	
Colorado Mines:		1–5	1–5		
Detroit Titans (Missouri Valley Conference) (1951–1953)
1951	Detroit	4–7	2–4	T–5th	
1952	Detroit	3–6	1–3	4th	
1953	Detroit	6–4	3–1	T–1st	
Detroit:		13–18	6–8		
Total:		14–22			
National championship Conference title Conference division title or championship game berth

=== College basketball ===
Record table
Season	Team	Overall	Conference	Standing	Postseason
Colorado College Tigers (Rocky Mountain Faculty Athletic Conference) (1930–1933)
1930–31	Colorado College	14–15			
1931–32	Colorado College	14–6			
1932–33	Colorado College	7–12			
Colorado College:		35–33			
Colorado Mines Orediggers (Rocky Mountain Faculty Athletic Conference) (1933–1934)
1933–34	Colorado Mines	1–13			
Colorado Mines:		1–13			
Colorado Buffaloes (Rocky Mountain Faculty Athletic Conference) (1934–1935)
1934–35	Colorado	3–9	3–9		
Colorado:		3–9	3–9		
Total:		39–55			

=== Professional football ===
Team	Year	Regular season					Postseason			
Team	Year	Won	Lost	Ties	Win %	Finish	Won	Lost	Win %	Result
DET	1937	7	4	0	.636	2nd in NFL Western	–	–	–	–
DET	1938	7	4	0	.636	2nd in NFL Western	–	–	–	–
DET Total		14	8	0	.636		–	–	–	–
CLE	1939	5	5	1	.500	4th in NFL Western	–	–	–	–
CLE	1940	4	6	1	.409	4th in NFL Western	–	–	–	–
CLE	1941	2	9	0	.182	5th in NFL Western	–	–	–	–
CLE	1942	5	6	0	.455	3rd in NFL Western	–	–	–	–
CLE Total		16	26	2	.386		–	–	–	–
NFL Total		30	34	2	.470		–	–	–	–
Total		30	34	2	.470		–	–	–	–
