= List of NFL Most Valuable Player awards =

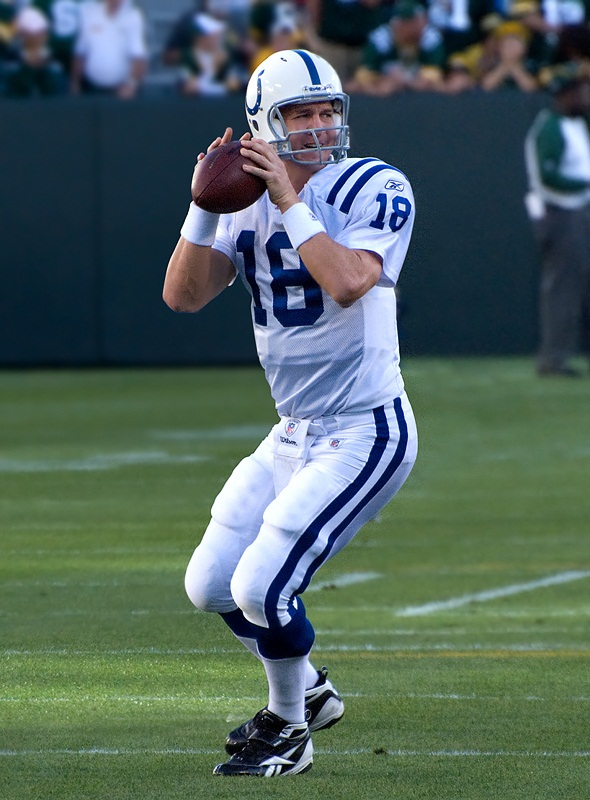
Peyton Manning was named AP NFL MVP a record five times.

In American football, most valuable player (MVP) awards are given by various entities to the National Football League (NFL) player who is considered the most valuable during the regular season. Organizations which issue an NFL MVP award include the Associated Press (AP) and the Pro Football Writers of America (PFWA). The Maxwell Football Club awards the Bert Bell Award to the league's player of the year, which many sources refer to as an NFL MVP award. Since the 2011 season, the NFL has held the annual NFL Honors ceremony, which recognizes the winner of the Associated Press MVP award.

The first award described as a most valuable player award was the Joe F. Carr Trophy, presented by the NFL from 1938 to 1946. Other organizations that previously issued an MVP include The Sporting News, United Press International (UPI), and the Jim Thorpe Trophy by the Newspaper Enterprise Association (NEA).

== List of winners ==
^	Denotes year in which a player swept all given awards

Year	AP	PFWA	The Sporting News	Jim Thorpe Trophy	Joe F. Carr Trophy	UPI	Bert Bell Award
1938	—	—	—	—	Mel Hein	—	—
1939	—	—	—	—	Parker Hall	—	—
1940	—	—	—	—	Ace Parker	—	—
1941	—	—	—	—	Don Hutson	—	—
1942	—	—	—	—	Don Hutson (2)	—	—
1943	—	—	—	—	Sid Luckman	—	—
1944	—	—	—	—	Frank Sinkwich	—	—
1945	—	—	—	—	Bob Waterfield	—	—
1946	—	—	—	—	Bill Dudley	—	—
1947	—	—	—	—	—	—	—
1948	—	—	—	—	—	Pat Harder	—
1949	—	—	—	—	—	—	—
1950	—	—	—	—	—	—	—
1951	—	—	—	—	—	Otto Graham	—
1952	—	—	—	—	—	—	—
1953	—	—	—	—	—	Otto Graham (2)	—
1954	—	—	Lou Groza	—	—	Joe Perry	—
1955	—	—	Otto Graham	Harlon Hill	—	Otto Graham (3)	—
1956	—	—	Frank Gifford	Frank Gifford	—	Frank Gifford	—
1957	Jim Brown	—	Jim Brown	Johnny Unitas	—	Y. A. Tittle	—
1958	Jim Brown (2)	—	Jim Brown (2)	Jim Brown	—	Jim Brown	—
1959	Johnny Unitas	—	Johnny Unitas	Charlie Conerly	—	Johnny Unitas	Johnny Unitas
1960	Norm Van Brocklin	—	Norm Van Brocklin	Norm Van Brocklin	—	Norm Van Brocklin	Norm Van Brocklin
1961	Paul Hornung	—	Paul Hornung	Y. A. Tittle	—	Paul Hornung	Paul Hornung
1962	Jim Taylor	—	Y. A. Tittle	Jim Taylor	—	Y. A. Tittle (2)	Andy Robustelli
1963	Y. A. Tittle	—	Y. A. Tittle (2)	Y. A. Tittle (2)	—	Jim Brown (2)	Jim Brown
1963	Y. A. Tittle	—	Y. A. Tittle (2)	Jim Brown (2)	—	Jim Brown (2)	Jim Brown
1964	Johnny Unitas (2)	—	Johnny Unitas (2)	Lenny Moore	—	Johnny Unitas (2)	Johnny Unitas (2)
1965	Jim Brown (3)	—	Jim Brown (3)	Jim Brown (3)	—	Jim Brown (3)	Pete Retzlaff
1966	Bart Starr	Bart Starr	Bart Starr	Bart Starr	—	Bart Starr	Don Meredith
1967	Johnny Unitas (3)	—	Johnny Unitas (3)	Johnny Unitas (2)	—	Johnny Unitas (3)	Johnny Unitas (3)
1968	Earl Morrall	—	Earl Morrall	Earl Morrall	—	Earl Morrall	Leroy Kelly
1969	Roman Gabriel	—	Roman Gabriel	Roman Gabriel	—	Roman Gabriel	Roman Gabriel
1970	John Brodie	—	—	John Brodie	—	—	George Blanda
1971	Alan Page	—	—	Bob Griese	—	—	Roger Staubach
1972	Larry Brown	—	—	Larry Brown	—	—	Larry Brown
1973	O. J. Simpson	—	—	O. J. Simpson	—	—	O. J. Simpson
1974	Ken Stabler	—	—	Ken Stabler	—	—	Merlin Olsen
1975	Fran Tarkenton	Fran Tarkenton	—	Fran Tarkenton	—	—	Fran Tarkenton
1976	Bert Jones	Bert Jones	—	Bert Jones	—	—	Ken Stabler
1977	Walter Payton	Walter Payton	—	Walter Payton	—	—	Bob Griese
1978	Terry Bradshaw	Earl Campbell	—	Earl Campbell	—	—	Terry Bradshaw
1979	Earl Campbell	Earl Campbell (2)	—	Earl Campbell (2)	—	—	Earl Campbell
1980	Brian Sipe	Brian Sipe	Brian Sipe	Earl Campbell (3)	—	—	Ron Jaworski
1981	Ken Anderson	Ken Anderson	Ken Anderson	Ken Anderson	—	—	Ken Anderson
1982	Mark Moseley	Dan Fouts	Mark Moseley	Dan Fouts	—	—	Joe Theismann
1983	Joe Theismann	Joe Theismann	Eric Dickerson	Joe Theismann	—	—	John Riggins
1984	Dan Marino	Dan Marino	Dan Marino	Dan Marino	—	—	Dan Marino
1985	Marcus Allen	Marcus Allen	Marcus Allen	Walter Payton (2)	—	—	Walter Payton
1986	Lawrence Taylor	Lawrence Taylor	Lawrence Taylor	Phil Simms	—	—	Lawrence Taylor
1987	John Elway	Jerry Rice	Jerry Rice	Jerry Rice	—	—	Jerry Rice
1988	Boomer Esiason	Boomer Esiason	Boomer Esiason	Roger Craig	—	—	Randall Cunningham
1989	Joe Montana	Joe Montana	Joe Montana	Joe Montana	—	—	Joe Montana
1990	Joe Montana (2)	Randall Cunningham	Jerry Rice (2)	Warren Moon	—	—	Randall Cunningham (2)
1991	Thurman Thomas	Thurman Thomas	Thurman Thomas	Thurman Thomas	—	—	Barry Sanders
1992	Steve Young	Steve Young	Steve Young	Emmitt Smith	—	—	Steve Young
1993	Emmitt Smith	Emmitt Smith	Emmitt Smith	Emmitt Smith (2)	—	—	Emmitt Smith
1994	Steve Young (2)	Steve Young (2)	Steve Young (2)	Steve Young	—	—	Steve Young (2)
1995	Brett Favre	Brett Favre	Brett Favre	Brett Favre	—	—	Brett Favre
1996	Brett Favre (2)	Brett Favre (2)	Brett Favre (2)	Brett Favre (2)	—	—	Brett Favre (2)
1997	Brett Favre (3)	Barry Sanders	Barry Sanders	Barry Sanders	—	—	Barry Sanders (2)
1997	Barry Sanders	Barry Sanders	Barry Sanders	Barry Sanders	—	—	Barry Sanders (2)
1998	Terrell Davis	Terrell Davis	Terrell Davis	Randall Cunningham	—	—	Randall Cunningham (3)
1999	Kurt Warner	Kurt Warner	Kurt Warner	Kurt Warner	—	—	Kurt Warner
2000	Marshall Faulk	Marshall Faulk	Marshall Faulk	Marshall Faulk	—	—	Rich Gannon
2001	Kurt Warner (2)	Marshall Faulk (2)	Marshall Faulk (2)	Kurt Warner (2)	—	—	Marshall Faulk
2002	Rich Gannon	Rich Gannon	Rich Gannon	Rich Gannon	—	—	Rich Gannon (2)
2003	Peyton Manning	Jamal Lewis	Peyton Manning	Peyton Manning	—	—	Peyton Manning
2003	Steve McNair	Jamal Lewis	Peyton Manning	Peyton Manning	—	—	Peyton Manning
2004	Peyton Manning (2)	Peyton Manning	Peyton Manning (2)	Peyton Manning (2)	—	—	Peyton Manning (2)
2005	Shaun Alexander	Shaun Alexander	Shaun Alexander	Shaun Alexander	—	—	Shaun Alexander
2006	LaDainian Tomlinson	LaDainian Tomlinson	LaDainian Tomlinson	LaDainian Tomlinson	—	—	LaDainian Tomlinson
2007	Tom Brady	Tom Brady	Tom Brady	Tom Brady	—	—	Tom Brady
2008	Peyton Manning (3)	Peyton Manning (2)	—	Kurt Warner (3)	—	—	Adrian Peterson
2009	Peyton Manning (4)	Peyton Manning (3)	—	—	—	—	Drew Brees
2010	Tom Brady (2)	Tom Brady (2)	—	—	—	—	Michael Vick
2011	Aaron Rodgers	Aaron Rodgers	—	—	—	—	Aaron Rodgers
2012	Adrian Peterson	Adrian Peterson	—	—	—	—	Adrian Peterson (2)
2013	Peyton Manning (5)	Peyton Manning (4)	—	—	—	—	Peyton Manning (3)
2014	Aaron Rodgers (2)	Aaron Rodgers (2)	—	—	—	—	J. J. Watt
2015	Cam Newton	Cam Newton	—	—	—	—	Cam Newton
2016	Matt Ryan	Matt Ryan	—	—	—	—	Matt Ryan
2017	Tom Brady (3)	Tom Brady (3)	—	—	—	—	Carson Wentz
2018	Patrick Mahomes	Patrick Mahomes	—	—	—	—	Patrick Mahomes
2019	Lamar Jackson	Lamar Jackson	—	—	—	—	Lamar Jackson
2020	Aaron Rodgers (3)	Aaron Rodgers (3)	—	—	—	—	—
2021	Aaron Rodgers (4)	Aaron Rodgers (4)	—	—	—	—	Jonathan Taylor
2022	Patrick Mahomes (2)	Patrick Mahomes (2)	—	—	—	—	Jalen Hurts
2023	Lamar Jackson (2)	Lamar Jackson (2)	—	—	—	—	Lamar Jackson (2)
2024	Josh Allen	Lamar Jackson (3)	—	—	—	—	Saquon Barkley
2025	Matthew Stafford	Matthew Stafford	—	—	—	—	Drake Maye

== See also ==
- List of NFL awards
- NFL Defensive Player of the Year Award
- NFL Offensive Player of the Year Award
- American Football League Most Valuable Player Award
- Bert Bell Award
- Super Bowl Most Valuable Player
