= Ike Petersen =

American football player (1909–1995)

- Petersen (far-left, holding football) October 27, 1935 (Chicago Cardinals vs. New York Giants)

No. 30, 6
- Position: Back

Personal information
- Born: July 8, 1909; Cedar River, Michigan, U.S.
- Died: August 6, 1995 (aged 86); Kirkland, Washington, U.S.
- Listed height: 5 ft 9 in (1.75 m)
- Listed weight: 185 lb (84 kg)

Career information
- College: Gonzaga (1931–1934)

Career history
- Chicago Cardinals (1935); Detroit Lions (1936)

Awards and highlights
- First-team Little All-American (1934)

Career statistics
- Rushing attempts: 136
- Rushing yards: 575
- Rushing touchdowns: 3
- Rushing average: 4.2
- Receptions: 10
- Receiving yards: 75
- Passing yards: 93
- TD–INT: 1–4
- Stats at Pro Football Reference

Kenneth Anthony "Ike" Petersen (July 8, 1909 – August 6, 1995) was an American professional football back who played two seasons in the National Football League (NFL) with the Chicago Cardinals and Detroit Lions. He played college football at Gonzaga University. His last name is sometimes misspelled as "Peterson".

== Early life and college ==
Kenneth Anthony Petersen was born on July 8, 1909, in Cedar River, Michigan. He attended Gonzaga Preparatory School in Spokane, Washington.

Petersen was a member of the Gonzaga Bulldoga of Gonzaga University from 1931 to 1934 and a three-year letterman from 1932 to 1934. He was named a first-team Little All-American by the Associated Press his senior year in 1934.

== Professional career ==
Petersen signed with the Chicago Cardinals in 1935. He played in 11 games, starting four, for the Cardinals during the 1935 season, recording 95 carries for 297 yards, two catches for 37 yards, and five completions on 17 passing attempts for 92 yards, one touchdown, and three interceptions.

In May 1936, Petersen was traded to the Detroit Lions for Pug Vaughan. Petersen appeared in 11 games, starting two, in 1936, totaling 41 rushing attempts for 278 yards and three touchdowns, eight receptions for 38 yards, and six incomplete passes for one interception. He had the longest carry in the NFL that year with an 84-yarder.

== Personal life ==
Petersen died on August 6, 1995, in Kirkland, Washington.
