= Connie Champagne =

American singer-songwriter and actress

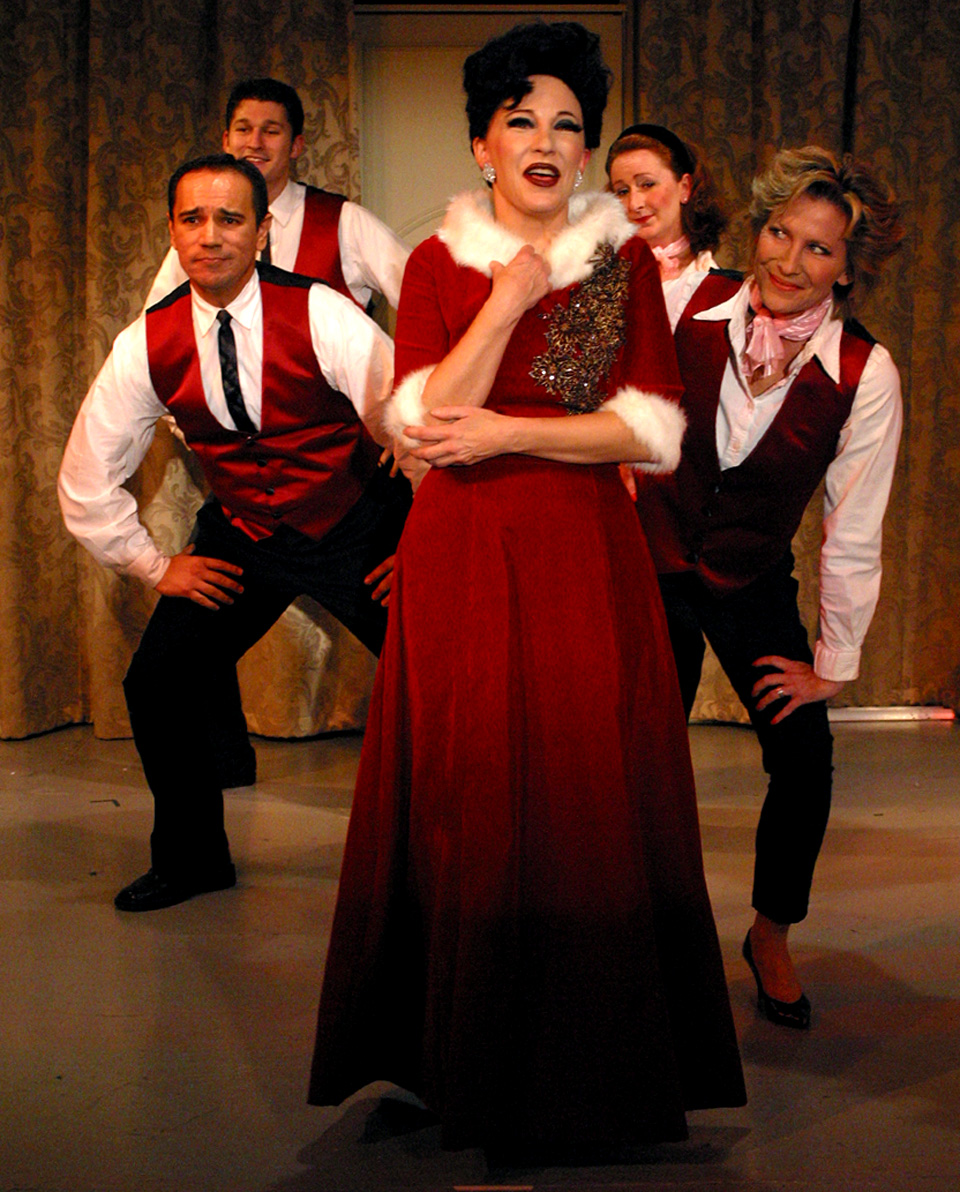
- Connie Champagne as Judy Garland in the musical Judy's Scary Little Christmas
- Born: Kelly Kay Brock; November 23, 1959 (age 66)
- Occupations: Actress, singer-songwriter
- Website: www.missconniechampagne.com

Connie Champagne, née Kelly Kay Brock, (born November 23, 1959), is an American singer, songwriter and actress. She won the SF Weekly Wammie Award for Outstanding Cabaret Performer. She is known for performing the character of actress Judy Garland in productions including Christmas With the Crawfords in 2001 and Imagine Judy Garland: An Evening With Connie Champagne in 2003. She won a 2007 San Francisco Bay Area Theater Critics Circle Award (BACTC) for her role in Goodbye Yellow Brick Road. Despite fierce competition by acclaimed Broadway actors including Phylicia Rashad, Champagne also earned Los Angeles' Ovation Award for Outstanding Performance by an Actress in A Musical, Judy's Scary Little Christmas, directed by Kay Cole. Specializing in numerous styles of music and theater including cabaret, swing, jazz, rock and roll, and musical theater, Champagne has performed in numerous venues throughout the US and Europe.

== Career ==
Champagne was born and raised in Roseville, California. She got her start at 9 years old singing with Bob Ringwald (father of film star Molly Ringwald) at the Placer County Fair. Despite Champagne's chaotic and sometimes painful childhood, her grandfather, former Detroit Lions football star Ernie Caddel, encouraged her to pursue singing and acting as a career. Her early attempts at singing were with local rock bands, including 'The Innocents' with Ric Walz-Smith and her then boyfriend Eric Martin, vocalist of the band Mr Big. In Sacramento, Connie starred in a summer music workshop production of Jesus Christ Superstar with Eric Martin. She starred in the role of Mary Magdalene as Kelly Brock. Champagne spent the early 80s as a vocalist for avant garde rock group Clocks of Paradise which featured Michael Belfer of The Sleepers, Mark Isham, Brian MacLeod, and Benjamin Bossi from Romeo Void, which led her to a stint as a back-up singer for Debora Iyall, and eventually Romeo Void. She toured extensively with Iyall, including tours with Cyndi Lauper and Jim Carroll. Champagne then switched gears and decided to study acting, landing her first role at San Francisco's Magic Theatre in a play titled Love In the 3rd Degree, written by noted actress O-Lan Jones. After performances at Theatre on the Square, Climate Theater, and Theatre Artaud, Champagne decided to study acting formally and earned her MFA from the American Conservatory Theater, where she also taught acting to youth for a number of years. During this time, Champagne met former Cockette Scrumbly Koldewyn, and the two formed the neo-cabaret group Connie Champagne and her Tiny Bubbles, which won numerous accolades including the SF Wammie Award for Outstanding Cabaret Performer. She also graduated from Mills College with a BA in Theater Arts. Champagne was originally named Kelly Brock, but the nickname “Champagne” stuck and is now her legal name. Prior to Champagne's irreverent approach to the Great American Songbook, cabaret artists primarily stuck to one genre, and Champagne “broke the rules.” Champagne's unique repertoire incorporated more modern songs written by artists such as Bob Dylan, David Bowie, Lou Reed, and Patti Smith and has since been emulated by many artists who came later, including Justin Bond and Paula West. In the 1990s she recorded and toured with swing pioneers The New Morty Show, featuring band leader Morty Okin and singer Vise Grip including a one-year engagement at the New York New York Hotel in Las Vegas, celebrating the music of Keely Smith and Louis Prima, Anita O’Day, and Louis Jordan. She still sings occasionally with the group.

In 1992, Champagne starred as Neely O’Hara in Phillip R. Ford’s adaptation of Valley of the Dolls which ran for four months. She was spotted by director F. Allen Sawyer, who cast her as the legendary Judy Garland in a holiday spoof titled Christmas With The Crawfords, which ran each holiday season for 12 years, playing in both LA and NYC. Working with drag performers Joey Arias and Doris Fish was an inspiration to Champagne, and she credits them for helping her develop vivid characters and sparking her interest in the work of Charles Ludlam's Theater of the Ridiculous. Champagne then performed at many night clubs as Judy, using her same eclectic approach singing Garland classics along with contemporary songs, produced by Harry Lit and the late Dan Kryston. Sawyer, along with musical director Joe Wicht, developed Goodbye Yellow Brick Road at the New Conservatory Theater; the production garnered several awards, including the Bay Area Theater Critic's Circle Award for Outstanding Performance by an Actress in a Musical. Champagne then was cast in two Los Angeles productions of Judy’s Scary Little Christmas, directed by Broadway legend Kay Cole. For this performance, Champagne won the Ovation Award for Outstanding Actress in a Musical. She often appears in clubs as Garland, and when asked if she is bored with being type cast in the Garland role, she answered, “No—the character is always complex & interesting—plus I’m a performer and I like to work!”

Champagne has done numerous voiceover projects, including the voice of Budgie in the animated feature FernGully 2: The Magical Rescue, voice directed by Jack Fletcher and work with Nik Phelps and the Sprocket Ensemble.

Champagne also performed in the 2008 Dusty Springfield tribute show Brand New Me. In 2009, Champagne reunited with Musical Director Scrumbly Koldewyn and began working with the award-winning underground theater group the Thrillpeddlers, and most recently appeared in Marat/Sade, directed by Russell Blackwood and produced by impresario Marc Huestis. In 2012, Champagne appeared in Trevor Anderson's Award-winning independent film The Man That Got Away, which was featured internationally, including at Berlinale Berlin, LA's OutFest, and Toronto's HotDocs Film Festivals.

In the spring of 2016, Champagne performed the role Judy Garland in Landmark Musical Theatre's Bay area premiere production of The Boy From Ozat the Great Star Theater.

Champagne is slated to perform Easter Parade In Concert with Scrumbly Koldewyn of The Cockettes' fame in March/April 2018 at Michael Feinstein's club "Feinstein's At The Nikko in 2018. She is currently based in San Francisco.

== Discography ==
- single ”Look Out Before the Word is No” (as Kelly Brock on Stymie Records)
- SF Compilation featuring Clocks of Paradise (Vet Records)
- La Strada (HeyDay Records) featuring original songs by They Might Be Giants and Jeff Trott (Sheryl Crow & World Party
- The Acoustic Music Project (HeyDay Records)
- Toast with The Electric Chairmen—(Weasel Disc) featuring Victor Krummenacher, Jonathan Segel, and John Kruth of Camper Van Beethoven
- The New Morty Show—Morty-Fied! (SlimStyle Records)
- Meet the Magnum Brutes featuring Connie Champagne (MG Records)
- Market Street Live (Du Nord Recording Company)
- Did Somebody Say Swing (Ripe Records)
- Pottery Barn Swing Compilation (Rock River, available through Pottery Barn)
- Imagine Judy Garland—An Evening with Connie Champagne (Castrobear Presents)
- Connie Sings Dusty (Appollo Records)
- Judy's Scary Little Christmas—(Original LA Cast Album)
- Judy—LIVE at the Rrazz Room! An Evening With Connie Champagne as Judy Garland (Adrian Records)
- Have Yourself A Merry Little Christmas—Recorded at SF's Rrazz Room (Adrian Records)
