= 1935 NFL Championship Game =

American football game

Coordinates: 42.416°N 83.137°W

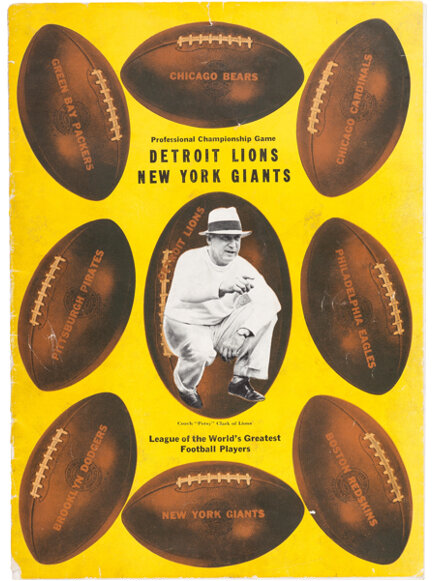
New York Giants (Eastern) (9–3)	Detroit Lions (Western) (7–3–2)
7	26
Head coach: Steve Owen	Head coach: Potsy Clark
	1	2	3	4	Total
NYG	0	7	0	0	7
DET	13	0	0	13	26
- Date: December 15, 1935
- Stadium: University of Detroit Stadium; Detroit, Michigan
- Attendance: 15,000

Location in the United States

The 1935 NFL Championship game was the third National Football League (NFL) title game, held on December 15 at University of Detroit Stadium (Titan Stadium) in Detroit, Michigan. The 1935 champion of the Western Division was the Detroit Lions (7–3–2) and the champion of the Eastern Division was the New York Giants (9–3).

The Giants, coached by Steve Owen, were in their third straight title game and were defending champions, while the Lions (coached by George "Potsy" Clark) were in their first title game, three years removed from their nailbiting loss in the indoor 1932 NFL Playoff Game as the Portsmouth Spartans.

With an estimated 15,000 fans in attendance, it was the least attended peacetime championship game in league history.

== Game summary ==
The weather in Detroit for the game was gray, wet, and windy, and the field at the University of Detroit's Titan Stadium was sloppy. The Lions took the opening kickoff and marched 61 yards down the field for a touchdown, with fullback Ace Gutowsky doing the honors on a 2-yard run. The Lions scored another first quarter touchdown on a twisting 40-yard run by star halfback Dutch Clark, giving Detroit a 13–0 lead.

Midway through the second quarter the Giants fought back with a 42-yard scoring pass from Ed Danowski to Ken Strong, with Detroit's Gutowsky managing to get a hand on the ball on defense but failing to break up the play.

The 13–7 halftime score managed to hold until late in the fourth quarter, when a low Giants punt hit one of the team's linemen and became a live ball, which was recovered by Detroit on the New York 26 yard line. A sweep by Ernie Caddel found the end zone, essentially icing the game for the home team. A pass interception by future Lions coach Buddy Parker gave the ball back to the Lions on the 10, leading to a final 4-yard touchdown run by Parker in the game's final seconds.

== Starting lineups ==
Players played both offensively and defensively until replaced by a substitute in this era. The starters included:

New York Giants	—	Detroit Lions
Ike Frankian	LE	Ed Klewicki
Bill Morgan	LT	John Johnson
Potsy Jones	LG	Regis Monahan
Mel Hein	C	Clare Randolph
Steve Owen	RG	Ox Emerson
Len Grant	RT	George Christensen
Tod Goodwin	RE	John Schneller
Ed Danowski	QB	Glenn Presnell
Ken Strong	LHB	Frank Christensen
Kink Richards	RHB	Ernie Caddel
Les Corzine	FB	Ace Gutowsky

=== Substitutes ===
Giants

Ends: Walt Singer, Gran Mitchell; Tackles: Tex Irvin, Jess Quatse; Guards: Bob Bellinger, Johnny Isola, Bernard Kaplan; Backs: Harry Newman, Leland Shaffer, Max Krause.

Lions

Ends: Ray Morse, Harry Ebding; Tackles: Jim Steen, Jim Stacey; Guards: Sam Knox, Tom Hupke; Center Elmer Ward; Backs: Dutch Clark, Bill Shepherd, Buddy Parker, Pug Vaughan, Tony Kaska.

== Scoring summary ==
Sunday, December 15, 1935
Kickoff: 2 p.m. EST

- First quarter
  - DET – Ace Gutowsky 2-yard run (Glenn Presnell kick) Lions 7–0
  - DET – Dutch Clark 40-yard run (kick failed) Lions 13–0
- Second quarter
  - NYG – Ken Strong 42-yard pass from Ed Danowski (Strong kick) Lions 13–7
- Third quarter
  - no scoring
- Fourth quarter
  - DET – Ernie Caddel 4-yard run (Clark kick) Lions 20–7
  - DET – Buddy Parker 4-yard run (kick failed) Lions 26–7

== Officials ==
- Referee: Tommy Hughitt
- Umpire: Bobby Cahn
- Head linesman: Maurice J. Meyer
- Field judge: Harry Robb

The NFL had only four game officials in 1935; the back judge was added in 1947, the line judge in 1965, and the side judge in 1978.

== Legacy ==
When asked about the game over 70 years later, Glenn Presnell (who was also the last surviving member of the Detroit Lions inaugural 1934 team) said about the game:

"I remember that it was a snowy day, very cold, and there were far less fans there than the '34 Thanksgiving Day game. In those days, people didn’t go very often when it wasn’t nice weather.

"I was the starting quarterback that game and for most of the season. Potsy liked to start me and see what was going on before sending in Dutch Clark. The one thing that stands out to me is that we scored in the first two minutes. I had thrown a flat pass to our blocking back on a fake for a 60-yard play to about their four-yard line. Ace Gutowsky punched it over for the score and I kicked the extra point. If we celebrated when we made a touchdown like the way they do today we would have been hooted off the field.

"For winning the championship, we each received $300. We never got a championship ring like they do now, but it was certainly one of my proudest moments. Remember, professional football was not nearly as popular as college football and baseball. It was much more exciting to play college football at Nebraska in front of 40,000 people. It was a way to make a living during the Depression."

== Detroit: "City of Champions" ==
When the Lions won the 1935 NFL Championship, the city of Detroit was mired in the Great Depression, which had hit Detroit and its industries particularly hard. But with the success of the Lions and other Detroit teams and athletes in 1935–1936, their luck appeared to be changing, as the city was dubbed the "City of Champions." The Detroit Tigers started the winning streak by capturing the 1935 World Series. The Lions continued the streak by winning the 1935 NFL Championship. They were followed by the Detroit Red Wings winning the 1935–36 Stanley Cup. With the Stanley Cup win on April 11, 1936, Detroit reigned as triple major league champions for nearly six months, until the Yankees clinched the 1936 World Series on October 6. No city has ruled as champions of three major sports simultaneously since.

But the Tigers, Lions and Wings were not the Motor City's only champions: Detroit's "Brown Bomber," Joe Louis, was the heavyweight boxing titlist; Detroiter Gar Wood, the first man to go 100 miles per hour on water, reigned as the world's top unlimited powerboat racer; and black Detroiter Eddie "the Midnight Express" Tolan had won gold medals in the 100- and 200-meter races at the 1932 Summer Olympics.
