= Pug Vaughan =

American football player (1911–1964)

Charles "Pug" Vaughan
- Vaughan in 1936

No. 8, 12
- Positions: Tailback, defensive halfback

Personal information
- Born: March 18, 1911; Knoxville, Tennessee, U.S.
- Died: March 30, 1964 (aged 53); Knoxville, Tennessee, U.S.
- Listed height: 5 ft 11 in (1.80 m)
- Listed weight: 181 lb (82 kg)

Career information
- High school: Knoxville (TN)
- College: Tennessee

Career history
- Detroit Lions (1935); Chicago Cardinals (1936)

Awards and highlights
- NFL champion (1935)

Career statistics
- Games played: 19
- Starts: 2
- Yards rushing: 130
- Stats at Pro Football Reference

Charles Wesley "Pug" Vaughan (March 18, 1911 – March 30, 1964) was an American football running back. He played college football under head coach Bob Neyland at the University of Tennessee from 1932 to 1934 and professional football for the Detroit Lions in 1935 and the Chicago Cardinals in 1936.

== Early life ==
Vaughan was born in Knoxville, Tennessee in 1911. He enrolled at the University of Tennessee and played at the halfback position under head football coach Bob Neyland from 1932 to 1934. For many years, he was regarded as "perhaps the finest passer in Tennessee football history." Coach Neyland considered Vaughan the best passer he developed at Tennessee, adding: "Vaughan's passing was almost perfect. His timing couldn't have been improved. The ball just floated into the hands of the receivers." During Vaughan's three years playing for the Volunteers, the team compiled an overall record of 24–5–1 and outscored opponents by a combined score of 589 to 141. In December 1934, Vaughan was voted as the most valuable player on the 1934 Tennessee Volunteers football team.

== Career ==
In his first year of professional football, Vaughan played for the 1935 Detroit Lions team that won the 1935 NFL Championship Game. He appeared in seven games for the Lions, completing 7 of 15 passes for 104 yards and rushing for 51 yards on 13 carries.

In May 1936, Vaughan was traded to the Chicago Cardinals for Ike Petersen. Playing for the Chicago Cardinals as a single-wing tailback in 1936, Vaughan rushed for only 79 yards on 67 carries, but he became one of the leading passers in the NFL. He completed 30 of 79 passes for 546 yards. He ranked fourth in the NFL in passing yards and sixth in passes completed during the 1936 NFL season.

During World War II, Vaughan served in the U.S. Coast Guard and played on the Coast Guard football team.

== Death ==
In March 1964, Vaughan died at age 53 at Ft. Sanders Presbyterian Hospital in Knoxville. He had been seriously ill since September 1963.
