= Butch Morse =

American football player (1910–1995)

- Morse in 1936

No. 27, 13
- Position: End

Personal information
- Born: December 5, 1910; Cleveland, Ohio, U.S.
- Died: May 22, 1995 (aged 84); Corvallis, Oregon, U.S.
- Listed height: 6 ft 2 in (1.88 m)
- Listed weight: 199 lb (90 kg)

Career information
- High school: Benson Poly Portland, OR
- College: Oregon

Career history
- Detroit Lions (1935–38; 1940)

Awards and highlights
- NFL champion (1935); First-team All-PCC (1934)

Career statistics
- Games played: 44
- Starts: 16
- Yards receiving: 345
- Touchdowns: 1
- Stats at Pro Football Reference

Raymond Joseph "Butch" Morse (December 5, 1910 – May 22, 1995) was an American football end who played five seasons in the National Football League (NFL).

== High school and college career ==
Born in Cleveland, Ohio, Morse later moved to Portland, Oregon, where he graduated from Benson Polytechnic High School in 1931. In addition to football, where he was MVP on Benson's 1928 city championship team, he played baseball and was the leading scorer for the school's basketball team in 1930.

Morse attended the University of Oregon, where he was a two-time all-Pacific Coast Conference end, and an All-American in his senior year of 1934, when he was also team co-captain.

== NFL career ==
Morse signed with the Detroit Lions in 1935, the year the Lions won their first NFL championship. Morse played for the Lions until 1940, when he was drafted into the United States Army Air Corps. In 1944, he was an assistant coach for the Air Corps' Randolph Field Flyers in the 1944 Cotton Bowl Classic, in which the Flyers tied the heavily favored Texas Longhorns, 7–7.

== Personal life and legacy ==
Morse as an assistant coach at Oregon State, 1951.

Morse married Alice Marie Simonsen in 1935 in Portland, and the couple had three children.

In 1951 Morse joined the staff headed by head coach Kip Taylor as an assistant coach at Oregon State College coaching the team's ends.

He was named to the Oregon Sports Hall of Fame in 1981 and the University of Oregon Athletic Hall of Fame in 1997. He died in Corvallis, Oregon in 1995.
