= Tony Kaska =

American football player (1911–1994)

No. 4, 6, 29, 9, 22, 56
- Position: Fullback

Personal information
- Born: July 1, 1911; Johnston City, Illinois, U.S.
- Died: August 9, 1994 (aged 83); Marin County, California, U.S.
- Listed height: 5 ft 11 in (1.80 m)
- Listed weight: 193 lb (88 kg)

Career information
- High school: Johnston City (Illinois)
- College: Illinois Wesleyan (1930–1933)

Career history
- St. Louis/Kansas City Blues (1934); Detroit Lions (1935); Brooklyn Dodgers (1936–1938); San Diego Bombers (1940); San Francisco Packers (1941–1942)

Awards and highlights
- NFL champion (1935); AFL champion (1934); All-AFL (1934)
- Stats at Pro Football Reference

Anton "Tony" Kaska (July 1, 1911 – August 9, 1994) was an American professional football fullback who played four seasons in the National Football League (NFL) with the Detroit Lions and Brooklyn Dodgers. He played college football at Illinois Wesleyan University.

== Early life and college ==
Anton Kaska was born on July 1, 1911, in Johnston City, Illinois. He attended Johnston City High School in Johnston City.

Kaska was a four-year letterman for the Illinois Wesleyan Titans of Illinois Wesleyan University from 1930 to 1933.

== Professional career ==
Kaska started all eight games for the St. Louis/Kansas City Blues of the American Football League (AFL) in 1934, scoring seven rushing touchdowns as the Blue finished the year first in the AFL with a 7–0–1 record. He earned Associated Press and Coaches All-AFL honors for the 1934 season.

Kaska signed with the Detroit Lions of the National Football League (NFL) on October 25, 1935. He played in two games for the Lions during the 1935 season, rushing five times for 15 yards. He also played in the 1935 NFL Championship Game, 26–7 victory over the New York Giants.

On August 26, 1936, it was reported that Kaska had signed with the Brooklyn Dodgers of the NFL. He appeared in all 12 games for the Dodgers in 1936, recording nine carries for 29 yards and one touchdown, one reception for five yards, and one passing attempt for an interception. He played in ten games, starting six, in 1937 totaling one rushing attempt for four yards and four catches for 84 yards. Kaska appeared in all 11 games, starting four, for the Dodgers during the 1938 season, rushing two times for one yard while also catching two passes for 77 yards.

Kaska signed with the San Diego Bombers of the Pacific Coast Professional Football League (PCPFL) on October 23, 1940. He played in, and started, one game for the Bombers that year.

Kaska started four games for the San Francisco Packers of the PCPFL in 1941. He was also a member of the Packers in 1942.

== Personal life ==
Kaska died on August 9, 1994, in Marin County, California.
