= Ernie Caddel =

American football player (1911–1992)

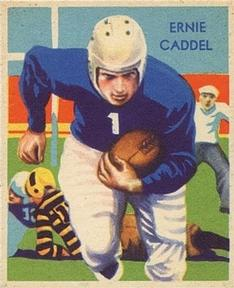
- 1935 National Chicle football card for Caddel

Profile
- Position: Running back

Personal information
- Born: March 12, 1911; Granite, Oklahoma, U.S.
- Died: March 28, 1992 (aged 80); Roseville, California, U.S.
- Listed height: 6 ft 2 in (1.88 m)
- Listed weight: 199 lb (90 kg)

Career information
- High school: Corcoran (CA)
- College: Stanford

Career history
- Portsmouth Spartans / Detroit Lions (1933–1938)

Awards and highlights
- NFL champion (1935); NFL rushing touchdowns leader (1935); NFL receiving touchdowns co-leader (1933); Second-team All-PCC (1932)
- Stats at Pro Football Reference

Ernest Wiley Caddel (March 12, 1911 – March 28, 1992) was an American football running back. He played college football for Glenn "Pop" Warner at Stanford University from 1930 to 1932 and later played six seasons in the National Football League (NFL) for the Portsmouth Spartans / Detroit Lions franchise (1933–1938). He helped lead the Detroit Lions to the NFL championship in 1935 and led the NFL in average yards gained per rushing carry for three consecutive years, from 1935 to 1937. He was also the first player in NFL history to finish among the top 10 players in the league in both rushing and receiving yards, accomplishing the feat in 1934 and again in 1936. He was known during his football career as the "Blond Antelope."

== Early life ==
Caddel was born in Granite, Oklahoma in 1911 and was raised near Fresno, California.

== Stanford ==
Caddel was given the name "Ee-Dub" after his father's initials E.W., as was the custom in those days. He enrolled at Stanford University in 1929 on a baseball scholarship, having never played football. Stanford would not recognize the initials "E.W," and so Caddel became "Ernie." While attending Stanford, head football coach Glenn "Pop" Warner noticed Caddel's athletic ability and persuaded him to play for the football team. He played at the halfback position for Stanford from 1930 to 1932. In November 1931, he drew national attention when he ran for three touchdowns, two on long runs, in a 32-6 victory over Dartmouth.

As a senior in 1932, Caddel starred for Stanford in September and October. In October 1932, a United Press correspondent wrote: "Ernie Caddel, a rangy fleet-footed halfback, is regarded by many as an All-America candidate. In every appearance this season he has brought spectators from their seats by his spectacular wide, sweeping runs around the end -- invariably evading tacklers for 15 to 30 yards." Caddel suffered two broken ribs in a game against Oregon State. To allow Caddel to play through the injury, Stanford's coach Warner created what has been described as the first flak jacket worn by a running back. The San Jose News in October 1932 noted that Caddel was wearing a shoulder brace "to permit him to play as long as wind and limib hold out." Another writer noted, "Pop made a paper pattern one day and the thing that night. It was an ingenious affair. ... It had steel ribs, but you hardly noticed the weight." Due to this injury, however, Caddel was unable to play baseball in the spring of his senior year, and he lost his Stanford scholarship. He was then recruited by the Portsmouth Spartans to play professional football in Ohio.

== Professional football ==
After graduating from Stanford, Caddel played professional football in the National Football League for six years from 1933 to 1938. Caddel was 6 feet, 2 inches, and weighed 190 pounds during his football playing career. With blonde, curly hair and "a beach-boy tan," he was "a striking figure in the Midwest" and became known as the "Blond Antelope."

Caddel began his professional football career in 1933 with the Portsmouth Spartans in Portsmouth, Ohio. He ran 82 yards for a touchdown on his first carry for the Spartans. Caddel accumulated 393 yards from scrimmage for the Spartans in 1933 and scored five touchdowns. As a rookie, he led the NFL in receiving touchdowns with three and finished second in the league with an average of 5.2 yards per touch.

In 1934, the Spartans were sold, and the new owner moved the team to Detroit, Michigan, and renamed them the Detroit Lions. Caddel started all 12 games and helped the Lions post a 10-3 record in their inaugural season. He was among the NFL leaders in 1934 with 655 yards from scrimmage (4th in the NFL), an average of 5.7 yards per touch (4th in the NFL), and 528 rushing yards (5th in the NFL).

As a third-year player, Caddel was both the leading rusher and the leading receiver for the 1935 Detroit Lions team that won the 1935 NFL Championship. He was also the second leading passer for the 1935 Lions with 169 passing yards. Caddel also led the NFL in 1935 in all-purpose yards (621), rushing touchdowns (6), yards per rushing attempt (5.2), and yards per touch (6.4). He also finished second in the NFL with 450 rushing yards.

Caddel remained one of the NFL's leading players in 1936. He accumulated 730 yards from scrimmage, third best in the NFL, and led the league with an average of 6.6 yards per touch and 6.4 yards per rushing attempt. His total of 19 pass receptions was also good for third best in the NFL during the 1936 season.

Caddel was the first player in NFL history to finish among the top 10 players in the league in both rushing and receiving yards. He accomplished the feat in 1934 and again in 1936. The next player to twice rank in the top 10 in both categories was Frank Gifford in 1956 and 1957.

In 1937, Caddel led the NFL for the third consecutive year in yards per rushing attempt with an average of 5.6 yards per carry.

== Later life ==
After retiring from football, Caddel operated an automobile dealership, Caddel Chevrolet, in Roseville, California, for 42 years. He became known for his charismatic personality and for starring in light-hearted TV commercials" with "The Roseville Gang." He died due to complications Alzheimer's in Roseville in 1992 at age 81, possibly brought on by head trauma from his years with the Lions.

During his early Spartan years, Caddel met his wife Nell Margaret Gableman, the daughter of Portsmouth's mayor. When they moved to Detroit, during the off-season, Caddel built cars in GM factory. General Motors noted his personality and good looks, and promoted him to sales. They had a daughter, Trudy Frances, and a granddaughter, noted vocalist Connie Champagne née Kelly Brock.
