= 1935 Green Bay Packers season =

NFL team season

- Head coach: Curly Lambeau
- Home stadium: City Stadium; Wisconsin State Fair Park

Results
- Record: 8–4
- Division place: 2nd NFL Western
- Playoffs: Did not qualify

The 1935 Green Bay Packers season was the franchise 's 17th season overall, 15th season in the National Football League, and the 17th under head coach Curly Lambeau. The team improved on their 7–6 record from 1934 and finished with an 8–4 record and earning them a second-place finish in the Western Conference. They failed to qualify for the playoffs for the fourth consecutive season.

== Regular season ==
=== Schedule ===
Game	Date	Opponent	Result	Record	Venue	Attendance	Recap	Sources
1	September 15	Chicago Cardinals	**L** 6–7	0–1	City Stadium	10,000	Recap	
2	September 22	Chicago Bears	**W** 7–0	1–1	City Stadium	13,600	Recap	
3	September 29	New York Giants	**W** 16–7	2–1	City Stadium	10,000	Recap	
4	October 6	Pittsburgh Pirates	**W** 27–0	3–1	City Stadium	5,000	Recap	
5	October 13	Chicago Cardinals	**L** 0–3	3–2	State Fair Park	13,000	Recap	
6	October 20	Detroit Lions	**W** 13–9	4–2	State Fair Park	9,500	Recap	
7	October 27	at Chicago Bears	**W** 17–14	5–2	Wrigley Field	29,386	Recap	
8	November 10	Detroit Lions	**W** 31–7	6–2	City Stadium	12,000	Recap	
9	November 17	at Detroit Lions	**L** 10–20	6–3	Dinan Field	12,500	Recap	
10	November 24	at Pittsburgh Pirates	**W** 34–14	7–3	Forbes Field	12,902	Recap	
11	November 28	at Chicago Cardinals	**L** 7–9	7–4	Wrigley Field	7,500	Recap	
12	December 8	at Philadelphia Eagles	**W** 13–6	8–4	Baker Bowl	4,000	Recap	
Note: Intra-division opponents are in **bold** text. Thanksgiving: November 28.

== Standings ==
NFL Western Division
	W	L	T	PCT	DIV	PF	PA	STK
Detroit Lions	7	3	2	.700	3–2–2	191	111	W2
Green Bay Packers	8	4	0	.667	4–4	181	96	W1
Chicago Cardinals	6	4	2	.600	3–2–2	99	97	L1
Chicago Bears	6	4	2	.600	1–3–2	192	106	W1

Note: Tie games were not officially counted in the standings until 1972.
