= Bill Shepherd (American football) =

American football player (1911–1967)

No. 33, 9
- Position: Running back

Personal information
- Born: December 4, 1911; Clearfield, Pennsylvania, U.S.
- Died: March 8, 1967 (aged 55); Detroit, Michigan, U.S.
- Listed height: 5 ft 9 in (1.75 m)
- Listed weight: 198 lb (90 kg)

Career information
- High school: Clearfield (PA)
- College: Western Maryland

Career history
- Boston Redskins (1935); Detroit Lions (1935–1940)

Awards and highlights
- NFL champion (1935)
- Stats at Pro Football Reference

William Leroy Shepherd (December 4, 1911 – March 8, 1967) was an American football running back who played six seasons in the National Football League (NFL) with the Boston Redskins and Detroit Lions. He played college football for the Western Maryland Green Terror.

== Attributes ==
Shepherd was describe as "heavy, strong, sawed-off (5′9″) running back who could be positioned at tailback or fullback alternately (and was a) productive pro passer." Shepherd was also known as being a great defensive player being "part of a vigorous defensive unit that shut out eight of its nine opponents, including all of the major foes: Villanova, Boston College, Catholic U, Georgetown and Bucknell.

== Football highlights ==
=== College ===
- In 1934 he led the nation in points with 133 at Western Maryland.
- Started and primary Back in the 1934 Chicago College All-Star Game against the #1 rank Chicago Bears.
- Started and was primary offence weapon in the 1934 East–West Shrine Game behind Michigan, center and later United States president; Gerald R. Ford
- Reported that the 55,000 fans at the 1934 Shrine game gave Shepherd a standing applause.
- 1934 AP All American Honorable Mention
- 1934 Liberty Magazine and Hearst All-Players 3rd Team
- Hall of Fame sports writer Grantland Rice, called Shepherd a triple threat, a better running back then Navy's Fred "Buzz" Borries and was a mistake he was not included on the All-American Team.

=== NFL ===
- Voted #1 or #2 running back four of his five years in the NFL.
- Helped lead the 1935 Detroit Lions to win the 1935 NFL Championship
- While Starting, the Detroit Lions, were the best rushing team in the NFL. Ranking #1 in 1935, '36, '37, '38; #4 in '39 and #5 in '40.
- Rank in the top 10 for rushing 3 times.
- Over 3,000 career Total offense.

All NFL Team

Year	Team	Voters
1935	2nd	GB Press-Gazette
1935	2nd	United Press International
1937	2nd	Collyers Eye Magazine
1938	1st	Collyers Eye Magazine
1938	1st	NY Daily News
1938	2nd	International News Service
1938	2nd	Pro Football Writers Association
1939	2nd	International News Service

== All-American controversy ==
According to James Mark Purcell, one of the founders of College Football Historical Society, Bill Shepherd, like many other players during his time, did not make the All-American Team due to politics. Purcell Explains that the coaches knew who he was as he was considered the best back the two All-star colleges games, while then 1st team all American Fred "Buzz" Borries only made it on as a reserve. He describe the situation in 1934 as "[would have been] politically impossible for even Jim Thorpe to get any All-America voter attention". Purcell gives the example that only one All-American started in the Chicago all-star game. He implies that the reasons for this were due Buzz Borriess playing for Navy and that two other great running backs also for consideration were from Shepherd's home town, splitting the vote among the local writers. Even Grantland Rice was quoted as saying that Shepherd was a better back then Buzz Borries and should have been on the all American team.

== See also ==
- List of NCAA major college football yearly scoring leaders
