= Elmer Ward =

American football player (1912–1996)

- Ward, c. 1937

Profile
- Position: Center

Personal information
- Born: October 13, 1912; Willard, Utah, U.S.
- Died: March 26, 1996 (aged 83); Ogden, Utah, U.S.
- Listed height: 6 ft 2 in (1.88 m)
- Listed weight: 215 lb (98 kg)

Career information
- High school: Box Elder (Brigham City, Utah)
- College: Utah State

Career history
- Detroit Lions (1935)

Awards and highlights
- NFL champion (1935); First-team All-American (1934)
- Stats at Pro Football Reference

Elmer Henry "Bear" Ward (October 13, 1912 – March 26, 1996) was an American football player. Ward was born in Willard, Utah, and attended Box Elder High School in Brigham City, Utah. He then enrolled at Utah State Agricultural College where he played college football for the Utah State Aggies football team. He was selected by the Newspaper Enterprise Association as a first-team center on the 1934 College Football All-America Team. He also played professional football for the NFL champion Detroit Lions during the 1935 NFL season. He was Utah State's first All-American athlete in any sport, and he was inducted into the Utah Sports Hall of Fame in 1984. He has also been inducted into the Utah State University Hall of Fame.
