= Don Hutson =

American football player and coach (1913–1997)

- Hutson in 1940

No. 14
- Positions: End, safety, kicker

Personal information
- Born: January 31, 1913; Pine Bluff, Arkansas, U.S.
- Died: June 26, 1997 (aged 84); Rancho Mirage, California, U.S.
- Listed height: 6 ft 1 in (1.85 m)
- Listed weight: 183 lb (83 kg)

Career information
- High school: Pine Bluff
- College: Alabama (1932–1934)

Career history

Playing
- Green Bay Packers (1935–1945)

Coaching
- Green Bay Packers (1944–1948) Assistant coach

Awards and highlights
- 3× NFL champion (1936, 1939, 1944); 2× NFL Most Valuable Player (1941, 1942); 8× First-team All-Pro (1938–1945); 3× Second-team All-Pro (1935–1937); 4× Pro Bowl (1939–1942); 8× NFL receptions leader (1936, 1937, 1939, 1941–1945); 7× NFL receiving yards leader (1936, 1938, 1939, 1941–1944); 9× NFL receiving touchdowns leader (1935–1938, 1940–1944); 5× NFL scoring leader (1940–1944); NFL interceptions co-leader (1940); NFL 1930s All-Decade Team; NFL 50th Anniversary All-Time Team; NFL 75th Anniversary All-Time Team; NFL 100th Anniversary All-Time Team; Green Bay Packers Hall of Fame; Green Bay Packers No. 14 retired; National champion (1934); Consensus All-American (1934); First-team All-SEC (1934); Third-team All-SEC (1933); SEC All-Time Team (1982); NFL records: Most seasons leading league in points scored: 5, (1940–1944; tied) (Note: Tied with Gino Cappelletti and Stephen Gostkowski) (Note: Hutson is the only player in league history to lead in points in five consecutive seasons); Most seasons leading league in touchdowns: 8 (1935–1938, 1941–1944) (Note: Hutson is the only player in league history to lead in touchdowns in consecutive seasons of four and five times each); Most triple crowns: 5

Career statistics
- Receptions: 488
- Receiving yards: 7,991
- Receiving touchdowns: 99
- Interceptions: 30
- Interception return yards: 389
- Safeties: 1
- Stats at Pro Football Reference
- Pro Football Hall of Fame
- College Football Hall of Fame

Donald Montgomery Hutson (January 31, 1913 – June 26, 1997), nicknamed "the Alabama Antelope", was an American professional football player and coach in the National Football League (NFL). In the era of the one-platoon football, he played as an end and spent his entire 11-year career with the Green Bay Packers. Under head coach Curly Lambeau, Hutson led the Packers to four NFL Championship Games, winning three in 1936, 1939, and 1944.

Hutson joined the Packers in 1935 and played 11 seasons before he retired in 1945. He led the league in receiving yards in seven separate seasons and led the league in receiving touchdowns in nine seasons. A talented safety on defense, he also led the NFL in interceptions in 1940. He is the only player to lead the league in receiving touchdowns and interceptions in the same season. Hutson was an eight-time All-Pro selection, a four-time All-Star, and was twice awarded the Joe F. Carr Trophy as the NFL Most Valuable Player.

Hutson is considered to have been the first modern wide receiver and is credited with creating many of the modern pass routes used in the NFL today. He was the dominant receiver of his day and is widely considered one of the greatest receivers in NFL history. Hutson was the first 1,000-yard receiver in the NFL, doing so in only 11 games. He held almost all major receiving records at the time of his retirement, including career receptions, yards, and receiving touchdowns. He was inducted as a charter member of both the College Football Hall of Fame and the Pro Football Hall of Fame. Hutson's number 14 was the first jersey retired by the Packers. He is a member of the Green Bay Packers Hall of Fame and was selected to the National Football League 50th Anniversary All-Time Team as one of the greatest players of the NFL's first 50 years in 1969, to the 75th in 1994, and to the 100th in 2019.

== Early life, family and education ==
Don Hutson was born on January 31, 1913, in Pine Bluff, Arkansas, one of three sons of Roy B. Hutson and Mabel Clark Hutson. He was a Boy Scout and played with snakes. He said that is where he got his quickness and agility. As a teenager Hutson played baseball for Pine Bluff's town team. As a senior at Pine Bluff High School he was an all-state basketball player, which he said was his favorite sport. "I'm like most [athletes]," he said. "I'd rather see football, but I'd rather play basketball." Hutson played one year of football at Pine Bluff. Paul "Bear" Bryant once remarked, "...he was something to see even then. We'd hitchhike to Pine Bluff just to watch him play. I saw him catch five touchdown passes in one game in high school."

== College athletic career ==
Hutson played at end for coach Frank Thomas's Alabama Crimson Tide football team from 1932 to 1934. Bear Bryant, future long-time coach of the Tide, was the self-described "other end" on the Tide in 1933 and 1934.

Sportswriter Morgan Blake ranked the undefeated 1934 Tide as the best team he ever saw. Hutson's College Football Hall of Fame profile reads: "Fluid in motion, wondrously elusive with the fake, inventive in his patterns and magnificently at ease when catching the ball ... Hutson and fellow Hall of Famer Millard "Dixie" Howell became football's most celebrated passing combination." In the 1935 Rose Bowl against Stanford, Hutson had six catches for 165 yards, including two touchdowns of 54 and 59 yards. He also scored the winning touchdown over Robert Neyland's Tennessee Volunteers on an end-around.

Hutson was recognized as a first-team All-American by six different organizations and received a second-team selection by one other. In an attempt to name retroactive Heisman Trophy winners before its first year of 1936, Hutson was awarded it for 1934 by the National Football Foundation. Georgia Tech coach Bill Alexander once said, "All Don Hutson can do is beat you with clever hands and the most baffling change of pace I've ever seen."

== Professional athletic career ==
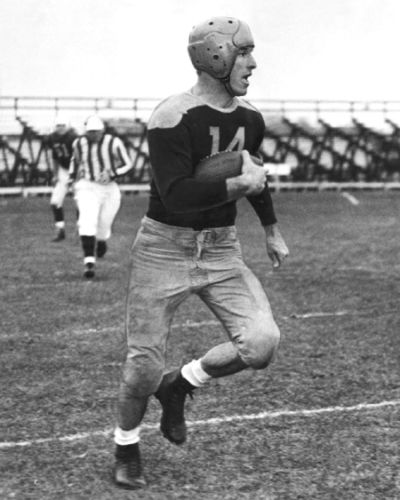
Hutson with the Packers

When he graduated from Alabama, Hutson did not plan on playing professionally. In those days, the NFL was not highly regarded in the South compared to college football. However, Green Bay Packers head coach Curly Lambeau saw the speedy Hutson as the perfect receiver for an expanded passing attack, which at the time revolved around the passing of single-wing backs Red Dunn and Arnie Herber to shifty halfback Johnny Blood.

Before the NFL draft existed, college players could sign with any team they wanted, and while Hutson did sign a contract with Green Bay, he had also signed a contract with the NFL's Brooklyn Dodgers. Both contracts came to the NFL office at the same time, and NFL president Joseph Carr declared that Hutson would go to Green Bay, as the Green Bay contract had an earlier date of signing. Hutson later claimed he chose the Packers because they offered the most money—$300 a game. "That was far and above what they had ever paid a player," said Hutson. "Each week they'd give me a check for $150 from one bank and $150 from another so nobody would know how much I was getting paid."

Hutson's first catch as a professional was on an 83-yard touchdown pass from Herber on the first play from scrimmage against the Chicago Bears, in the second game of the 1935 season. It was the only score of the game as the Packers won 7–0. He caught six touchdowns total in his rookie season, which led the league. It was the first in a string of four straight seasons and nine seasons total that Hutson led the league in touchdown receptions.

The 1936 season brought the Packers their fourth league title, with a 21–6 win over the Boston Redskins in the 1936 NFL Championship Game. Hutson scored the first touchdown of the game, on a 48-yard pass from Herber in the first quarter. Hutson became the youngest player in league history to lead the league in both receptions and receiving yardage, a record not broken until 2022 by Minnesota Vikings receiver, Justin Jefferson. He completed the season with 34 receptions for 536 yards and eight touchdowns, which were all league records, and helped Herber set the NFL season passing yards record. Hutson's yardage record was broken the next season by Chicago Cardinals receiver Gaynell Tinsley, who challenged Hutson over the next few years for the title of best receiver in the NFL.

In 1938, Hutson had nine touchdown receptions, again setting the league record, as he led the Packers to another NFL Championship Game, this time against the New York Giants. However, a knee injury he suffered four weeks earlier kept him out of the game's starting lineup. He entered as a substitute three separate times late in the game but was unable to be a factor, catching no passes as Green Bay was defeated 23–17.

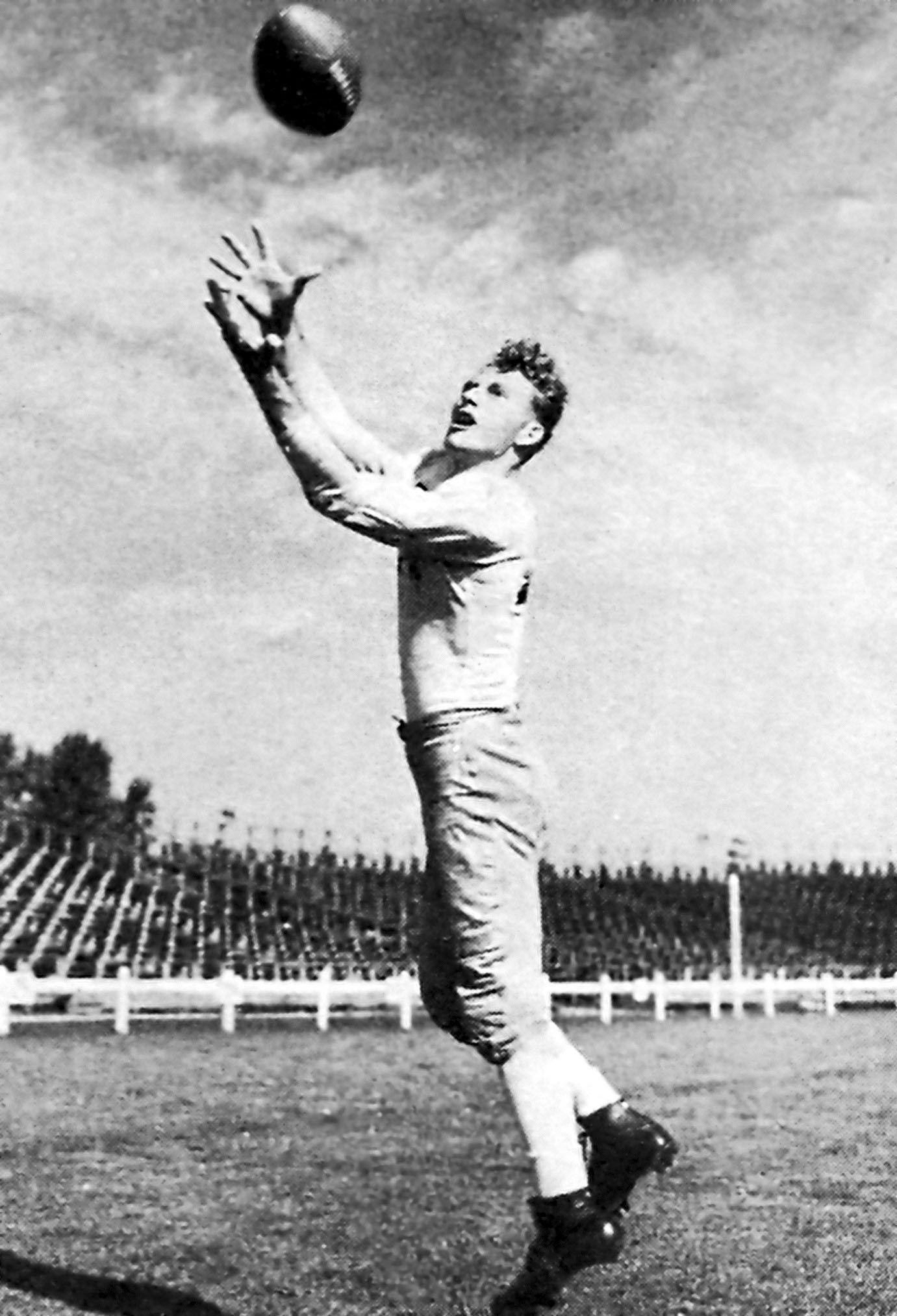
Hutson making a catch c. 1940

Hutson reclaimed the season receiving yards record from Tinsley in 1939 by catching 34 passes for 846 yards—an average of 24.9 yards per reception, the highest of his career. He again led the Packers to the championship game, for a rematch against the Giants. This time Green Bay was victorious, with a 27–0 shutout win. Hutson had two receptions in the game for 21 yards and a rushing attempt that went for three yards.

In 1940, Hutson scored seven touchdowns and kicked 15 extra points to lead the league in scoring by edging out Rams fullback Johnny Drake by a single point. On September 29, Hutson caught his 38th career touchdown pass, breaking Johnny Blood's record. With 99 touchdown receptions for his career, he remained the record holder for almost 50 years, until surpassed by the last touchdown of Steve Largent's career in 1989.

In 1941, Hutson became the first receiver to catch 50 passes in a season, doing so while again leading the league in receptions, receiving yards, and touchdowns. He also scored two rushing touchdowns, for a total of 12. After the season, he was awarded the Joe F. Carr Trophy as the league's most valuable player. He received six of the nine first place votes, finishing ahead of his quarterback Cecil Isbell, who received two first place votes.

Hutson repeated as league MVP in 1942 as he shattered most of his own records; he caught 74 passes for 1,211 yards and 17 touchdowns and averaged over 110 receiving yards per game. This was the first time a receiver had reached the 1,000 yard milestone. He again received six of nine first place votes for the Joe F. Carr Trophy. "The selection did not rest alone on his great pass catching ability," reasoned the selection committee. "Also considered were his nuisance value as a disrupter of enemy defenses and his ability to transform the Packers into a confident, powerful aggregation in clutch situations." His production helped Isbell become the first NFL quarterback to throw for over 2,000 yards in a season.

In February 1943, Hutson announced his retirement from football due to a lingering chest injury. He changed his mind and returned for the 1943 season, however, and caught 47 passes for 776 yards and eleven touchdowns, leading the league in all three. He also threw his first and only completed pass of his career: a 38-yard touchdown pass to Harry Jacunski against the Bears. Additionally, he successfully kicked 36 extra points on 36 tries, and had an 83-yard interception return touchdown. After the season Hutson again announced his intention to retire as a player, this time to be an assistant coach for the Packers. He once again returned as a player in 1944 and again led the league with 58 receptions, 866 yards, and nine touchdowns, while also serving as assistant coach. He led the Packers to the 1944 NFL Championship Game against the Giants and caught two passes for 47 yards, as the Packers won their third and final championship with Hutson, 14–7.

Diagram of the chair route, a Hutson innovation

For the third time in as many years, Hutson announced his retirement, and for the third time he returned as a player in 1945. A sportswriter for The Pittsburgh Press jokingly declared Hutson "holder of the world's record for coming out of retirement." In a week three, 57–21 blowout win against the Detroit Lions, Hutson set an NFL record with four touchdown receptions in a game, all of them coming in the second quarter. He also kicked five extra points in the quarter, for a total of 29 points, which as of 2025 remains a record for points by a player in a single quarter. In all, Hutson caught 488 passes for 7,991 yards and 99 touchdowns. He rushed for three touchdowns, scored two touchdowns on blocked punts, and had an interception return touchdown for a career total of 105. He scored at least six receiving touchdowns in each of his 11 seasons. Hutson led the NFL in receptions eight times, including five consecutive times: 1941 to 1945. He led the NFL in receiving yards seven times, including four straight times: 1941 to 1944. He led the NFL in scoring five times: 1941 to 1945. As of 2016, Hutson still holds the highest career average touchdowns per game for a receiver, at 0.85. Hutson's single season record of 17 touchdown receptions in 1942 stood for 42 years until broken by receiver Mark Clayton in 1984, a year in which Miami's quarterback Dan Marino had more completions (362) than the entire 1942 Packers team's pass attempts (330). His four receiving touchdowns in a game has been surpassed three times and tied several times, but his four in a single quarter has yet to be matched. His record 99 touchdown receptions stood for 44 years until it was finally broken by Steve Largent in 1989, well into the modern era. In his 11-year professional career, Hutson never missed a game due to injury. He invented many pass routes still in use today, including the chair route.

At his peak, Hutson was a challenge to defend, mainly because no one had ever seen anything like him in the NFL before. Even when opposing defenses deployed their best defender or multiple defenders against Hutson, he was almost always able to break free. Hutson's ability to beat defenders was remarkable considering he played in an era when there were far fewer restrictions on how and when a defender could legally hit a receiver. It was initially thought that the 6–1, 185-pound Hutson was too fragile for the NFL. However, according to Tony Canadeo, who played alongside Hutson from 1941 to 1944, Hutson was as skilled going over the middle as he was going deep.

=== Defense and special teams ===
For many of his 11 seasons, Hutson was also the Packers' kicker. He added 172 extra points on 183 attempts and seven field goals on 15 attempts for another league record 823 points. He led the league in extra points made and attempted in 1941, 1942 and 1945 and in field goals made in 1943. As did almost all players in his day, Hutson played both offense and defense. On defense, he played safety and intercepted 30 passes over the final six years of his career. (Note: Interceptions were not counted in statistics until the 1940 season.) His highest season total was in 1943, when he intercepted eight passes in ten games. In 1940, he led the NFL with six interceptions.

Hutson was a player-coach during the last two seasons of his playing career. After his retirement as a player, Hutson remained on the Packers staff as an assistant until 1948.

== Personal and later life ==
From an early age Hutson was interested in business. "At the university [of Alabama], I was the only athlete in the business school," he said. "The only reason I wanted to play pro sports was to get a stake." While both were students at Alabama, he partnered with Bear Bryant to operate a laundromat in Tuscaloosa called Captain Kidd Cleaners. However, neither were educated in laundering, and they sold the business after two years. While in Green Bay, Hutson opened the Packer Playdium bowling alley, which proved so successful that he twice considered retirement from football to fully dedicate his time to its operation. He then started the Hutson Motor Car Co. dealership and in 1951 purchased Chevrolet and Cadillac agencies in Racine, Wisconsin. "I never aimed for automobiles," said Hutson. "That just happened to be the thing I got into. I just wanted to run a business, any business. He also served on the Packers board of directors from 1952 to 1980, when he was elected a director emeritus.

Hutson was a Freemason.

After he retired from the dealership business, Hutson settled in Rancho Mirage, California, where he lived until his death on June 26, 1997, at the age of 84.

== Honors and recognition ==
Hutson at his induction to the Pro Football Hall of Fame in 1963

Hutson has been honored in a variety of ways. He was elected to the Wisconsin Athletic Hall of Fame as a charter member in 1951, and the Alabama Sports Hall of Fame in 1968, also as an initial member. His number 14 was the first number retired by the Packers, in a public ceremony at a game at City Stadium on December 2, 1951. Hutson Street in the Packerland Industrial Park in Green Bay is named for him, and in 1994 the Packers named their new state-of-the-art indoor practice facility across the street from Lambeau Field the "Don Hutson Center."

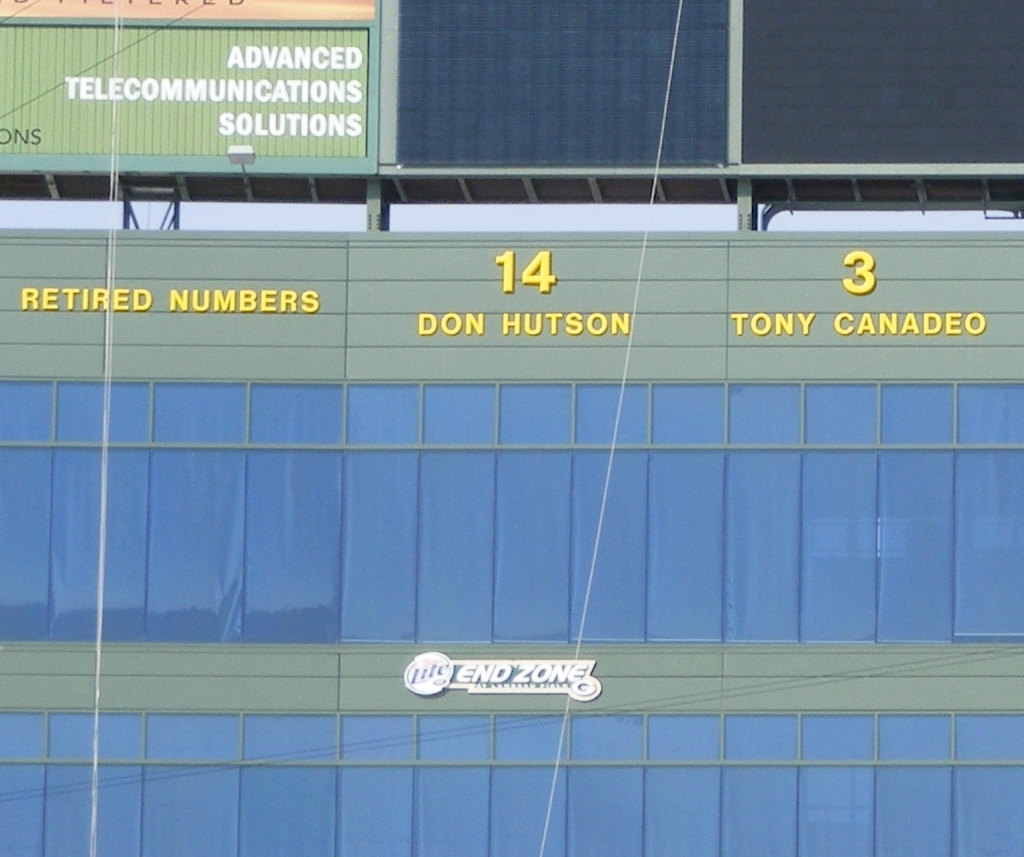
Hutson's number 14 displayed at Lambeau Field

Hutson was inducted as a charter member of both the College Football Hall of Fame in 1951, and Pro Football Hall of Fame in 1963. His college career made him a unanimous choice for the Associated Press Southeast Area All-Time football team 1920–1969 era. Hutson is a member of the Green Bay Packers Hall of Fame, inducted in 1972 along with his quarterbacks, Arnie Herber and Cecil Isbell. There is a park named after him in his hometown of Pine Bluff, Arkansas. On the occasion of his 75th birthday he performed the ceremonial coin toss of Super Bowl XXII to end the pregame ceremonies. Hutson was named to the NFL's 1930s All-Decade Team and 50th Anniversary Team in 1970, and in 1994 he was named to the NFL 75th Anniversary All-Time Team. In 1999, he was ranked sixth on The Sporting News list of the 100 Greatest Football Players, the highest-ranking Packer and the highest-ranking pre–World War II player. In 2012, the NFL Network named Hutson the greatest Green Bay Packer of all time.

In 2005, the Flagstad family of Green Bay donated to the Green Bay Packers Hall of Fame an authentic Packers No. 14 jersey worn by Hutson. The jersey was found in a trunk of old uniforms in 1946 at the Rockwood Lodge, the Packers' summer training camp from 1946 to 1949, owned by Melvin and Helen Flagstad. The jersey, a rare NFL artifact valued at over $17,000, was donated by son Daniel Flagstad in memory of his parents.

Hutson's most productive seasons were from 1942 to 1945, a time in which the NFL was severely depleted with many of its most talented players and prospective college athletes serving in the military during World War II. Hutson was classified I-A for the military draft, but had three daughters, so was able to avoid conscription. On the notion that Hutson exploited watered-down defenses, former Packers Hall of Fame running back Paul Hornung responded as such: "I'm a believer. Am I a believer! You know what Hutson would do in this league today? The same things he did when he played."

== NFL records ==
As of the end of the 2017 NFL season, Hutson still holds the following records: most seasons leading league in pass receptions (8), most consecutive seasons leading league in pass receptions (5), most seasons leading league in pass receiving yards gained (7), most consecutive seasons leading league in pass receiving yards gained (4), most seasons leading league in pass receiving touchdowns (9), most seasons leading the league in total touchdowns (8), Most consecutive seasons leading league in pass receiving touchdowns (5), most seasons leading league in scoring (5, now tied), and most consecutive seasons leading league in scoring (5). Sportswriter Zipp Newman referred to Hutson as "the Ty Cobb of the gridiron."

Records held as of retirement:

- Most seasons led league, scoring: 5*
- Most consecutive seasons led league, scoring: 5*
- Most touchdowns scored in a quarter: 4*
- Most touchdown receptions in a quarter: 4*
- Most points scored in a quarter: 29*
- Most seasons led league, touchdowns: 8*
- Most consecutive seasons led league, touchdowns: 4*
- Most seasons led league, receiving touchdowns: 9*
- Most consecutive seasons led league, receiving touchdowns: 5*
- Most seasons led league, receptions: 8*
- Most consecutive seasons led league, receptions: 5*
- Most seasons led league, receiving yards: 7*
- Most consecutive seasons led league, receiving yards: 4*
- Most receptions, career: 488
- Most receptions, season: 74
- Most receptions, game: 14
- Most receiving yards, career: 7,991
- Most receiving yards, season: 1,211
- Most receiving yards, game: 209
- Most receiving touchdowns, career: 99
- Most touchdowns, season: 17
- Most touchdowns, game: 4
- Most points scored in a calendar month: 74 (Four games in October 1945)

Note: * = remains an NFL record as of 2017 season

Hutson was the youngest receiver in NFL history, at the age of 23 during the 1936 season, to lead the league in both receptions and receiving yards during a single season. The mark was not broken for 86 years until 2022, when Minnesota Vikings receiver Justin Jefferson surpassed it.

== NFL career statistics ==
Legend
	Joe F. Carr MVP Trophy
	NFL champion
	Led the league
**Bold**	Career high

=== Regular season ===
Year	Team	Games		Receiving							Rushing							Defense				Kicking				Total Pts
Year	Team	GP	GS	Rec	Yds	Avg	Lng	TD	R/G	Y/G	Att	Yds	Avg	Lng	TD	A/G	Y/G	Int	Yds	TD	Sfty	XPM	XPA	FGM	FGA	Total Pts
1935	GB	9	5	18	420	23.3	83	6	2.0	46.7	6	22	3.7	—	0	0.7	2.4	—	—	—	—	1	—	—	—	43
1936	GB	12	5	34	536	15.8	58	8	2.8	44.7	1	-3	-3.0	-3	0	-0.1	-0.3	—	—	—	—	—	—	—	—	54
1937	GB	11	5	41	552	13.5	78	7	3.7	50.2	**14**	26	1.9	—	0	1.3	2.4	—	—	—	**1**	—	—	—	—	42
1938	GB	10	7	32	548	17.1	54	9	3.2	54.8	3	-1	-3.0	—	0	-0.3	-0.1	—	—	—	—	3	3	—	—	57
1939	GB	11	8	34	846	**24.9**	**92**	6	3.1	76.9	5	26	5.2	—	0	0.5	2.4	—	—	—	—	2	2	—	—	38
1940	GB	11	6	45	664	14.8	36	7	4.1	60.4	—	—	—	—	—	—	—	6	24	0	0	15	16	—	—	57
1941	GB	11	4	58	738	12.7	45	10	5.3	67.1	4	22	5.5	18	**2**	0.4	2.0	1	32	0	0	20	24	1	1	95
1942	GB	11	4	**74**	**1,211**	16.4	73	**17**	**6.7**	**110.1**	3	4	1.3	9	0	0.3	0.4	7	71	0	0	33	34	1	4	**138**
1943	GB	10	9	47	776	16.5	79	11	4.7	77.6	6	41	6.8	16	0	0.6	4.1	**8**	**197**	**1**	0	**36**	**36**	**3**	**5**	117
1944	GB	10	7	58	866	14.9	55	9	5.8	86.6	12	**87**	7.3	**27**	0	**1.2**	**8.7**	4	50	0	0	31	33	0	3	85
1945	GB	10	0	47	834	17.7	75	9	4.7	83.4	8	60	**7.5**	18	1	0.8	6.0	4	15	0	0	31	35	2	4	97
Career		116	60	488	7,991	16.4	92	99	4.2	68.9	62	284	4.6	27	3	0.5	2.4	30	389	1	1	172	183	7	17	825

=== Post-season ===
Year	Team	Games		Receiving							Rushing							Kicking		Total Pts
Year	Team	GP	GS	Rec	Yds	Avg	Lng	TD	R/G	Y/G	Att	Yds	Avg	Lng	TD	A/G	Y/G	XPM	XPA	Total Pts
1936	GB	1	1	**5**	**76**	15.2	**48**	**1**	**5.0**	**76.0**	—	—	—	—	—	—	—	—	—	**6**
1938	GB	1	0	—	—	—	—	—	—	—	—	—	—	—	—	—	—	—	—	0
1939	GB	1	1	2	21	10.5	15	0	2.0	21.0	**1**	**3**	**3.0**	**3**	**0**	**1.0**	**3.0**	—	—	0
1941	GB	1	1	1	19	19.0	19	0	1.0	19.0	—	—	—	—	—	—	—	**2**	**2**	2
1944	GB	1	1	2	47	**23.5**	24	0	2.0	47.0	—	—	—	—	—	—	—	**2**	**2**	2
Career		5	4	10	163	16.3	48	1	2.0	32.6	1	3	3.0	3	0	0.6	0.2	4	4	10
