= George Clark (American football coach) =

American football coach (1894–1972)

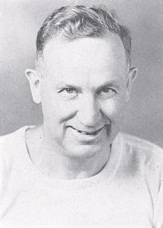
- Clark from 1946 Cornhusker

Biographical details
- Born: March 20, 1894; Carthage, Illinois, U.S.
- Died: November 8, 1972 (aged 78); La Jolla, California, U.S.

Playing career

Football
- 1914–1915: Illinois

Baseball
- 1915–1916: Illinois
- Position: Quarterback (football)

Coaching career (HC unless noted)

Football
- 1916: Kansas (assistant)
- 1919: Illinois (assistant)
- 1920: Michigan Agricultural
- 1921–1925: Kansas
- 1926: Minnesota (associate HC)
- 1927–1929: Butler
- 1931–1936: Portsmouth Spartans / Detroit Lions
- 1937–1938: Brooklyn Dodgers
- 1940: Detroit Lions
- 1945: Nebraska
- 1948: Nebraska

Baseball
- 1920: Illinois
- 1921: Michigan Agricultural
- 1922–1925: Kansas
- 1927: Minnesota
- 1928: Butler

Administrative career (AD unless noted)
- 1927–1930: Butler
- 1948–1953: Nebraska

Head coaching record
- Overall: 40–45–7 (college football); 64–42–12 (NFL); 71–55–3 (college baseball)

Accomplishments and honors

Championships
- Football; 1 NVC (1923); NFL Championship (1935)

Awards
- Third-team All-American (1914); First-team All-Western (1914)

George M. "Potsy" Clark (March 20, 1894 – November 8, 1972) was an American football and baseball player, coach, and athletics administrator. He served as the head football coach at Michigan Agricultural College, now Michigan State University, (1920), the University of Kansas (1921–1925), Butler University (1927–1929), and the University of Nebraska–Lincoln (1945, 1948), compiling a career college football record of 40–45–7. Clark was also the head coach of the National Football League's Portsmouth Spartans/Detroit Lions (1931–1936, 1940) and Brooklyn Dodgers (1937–1938), amassing a career NFL mark of 64–42–12. Clark's 1935 Detroit Lions team won the NFL Championship. From 1945 to 1953, Clark served as the athletic director at Nebraska.

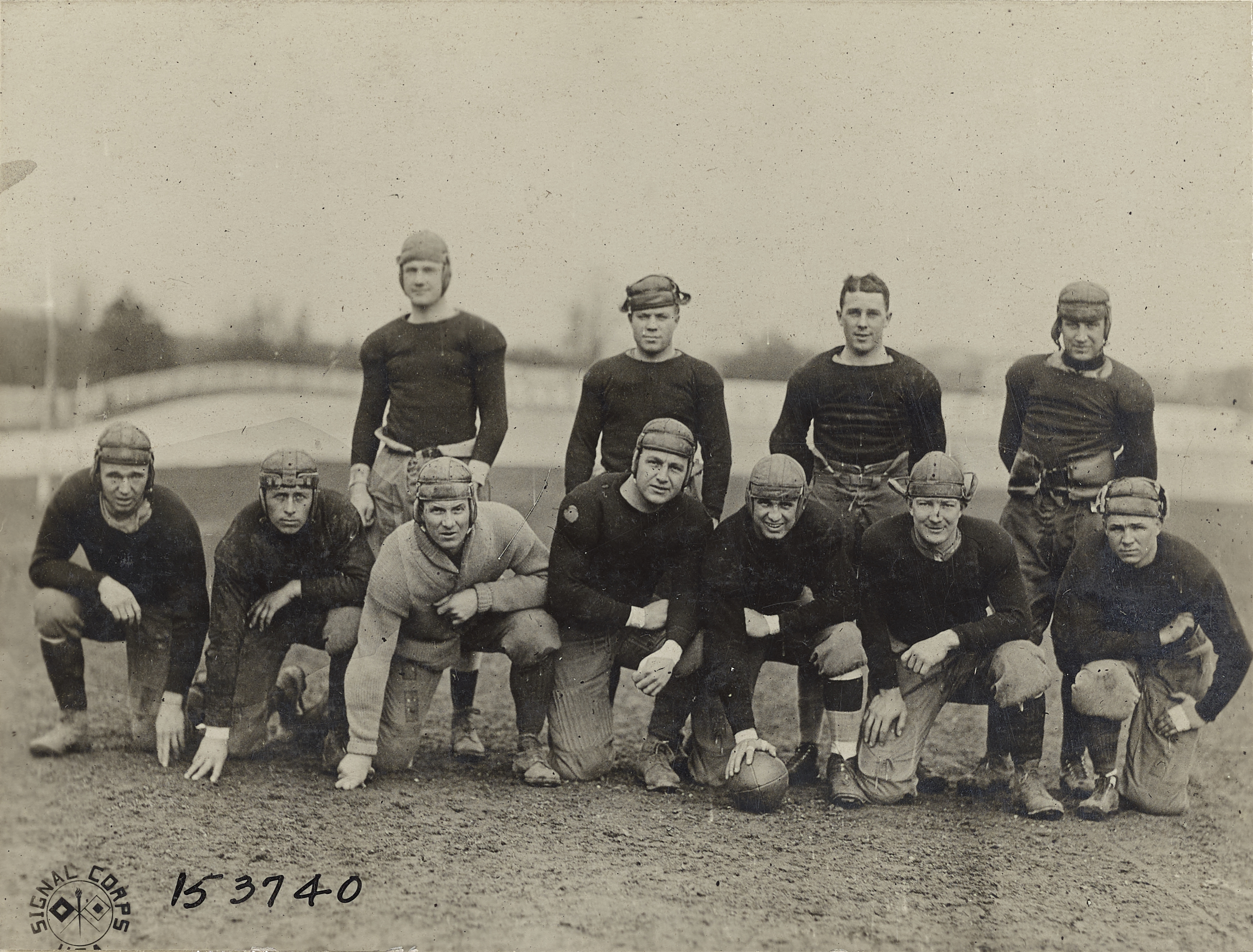
89th Division team, Clark at top right

As a member of the American Expeditionary Force (AEF) during World War I, Clark was a member of the U.S. Army's 89th Division's football team that won the AEF championship in March 1919. In a team with many college football stars, Charles Gerhardt played quarterback and Clark played left halfback under the direction of right guard, team captain and coach Paul Withington.

== Head coaching record ==
=== College football ===
Year	Team	Overall	Conference	Standing	Bowl/playoffs
Michigan Agricultural Aggies (Independent) (1920)
1920	Michigan Agricultural	4–6			
Michigan Agricultural:		4–6			
Kansas Jayhawks (Missouri Valley Conference) (1921–1925)
1921	Kansas	4–3	3–3	5th	
1922	Kansas	3–4–1	1–3–1	6th	
1923	Kansas	5–0–3	3–0–3	T–1st	
1924	Kansas	2–5–1	2–4–1	7th	
1925	Kansas	2–5–1	2–5–1	8th	
Kansas:		16–17–6	11–15–6		
Butler Bulldogs (Independent) (1927–1929)
1927	Butler	4–3–1			
1928	Butler	6–2			
1929	Butler	4–4			
Butler:		14–9–1			
Nebraska Cornhuskers (Big Six Conference) (1945)
1945	Nebraska	4–5	2–3	4th	
Nebraska Cornhuskers (Big Seven Conference) (1948)
1948	Nebraska	2–8	2–4	T–5th	
Nebraska:		6–13	4–7		
Total:		40–45–7			
National championship Conference title Conference division title or championship game berth

=== NFL ===
Team	Year	Regular season					Postseason			
Team	Year	Won	Lost	Ties	Win %	Finish	Won	Lost	Win %	Result
PRT	1931	11	3	0	.786	2nd in NFL	-	-	-	-
PRT	1932	6	2	2	.750	3rd in NFL	0	1	.000	Lost Playoff Game to Chicago Bears
PRT	1933	6	5	0	.545	2nd in NFL Western	-	-	-	-
DET	1934	10	3	0	.769	2nd in NFL Western	-	-	-	-
DET	1935	7	3	2	.769	1st in NFL Western	1	0	1.000	Won NFL Championship over New York Giants
DET	1936	8	4	0	.667	3rd in NFL Western	-	-	-	-
BKK	1937	3	7	1	.300	4th in NFL Eastern	-	-	-	-
BKK	1937	4	4	3	.500	3rd in NFL Eastern	-	-	-	-
BKK	1939	4	6	1	.400	3rd in NFL Eastern	-	-	-	-
BKK Total		11	17	5	.393		-	-	-	
DET	1940	5	5	1	.500	3rd in NFL Western	-	-	-	-
PRT/DET Total		53	25	7	.679		1	0	1.000	
Total		64	42	12	.604		1	0	1.000	

== See also ==
- List of college football head coaches with non-consecutive tenure
