= List of NFL annual receptions leaders =

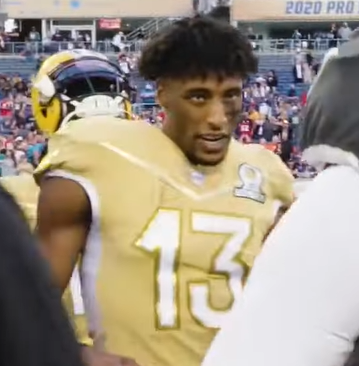
Michael Thomas currently holds the single-season receptions record with 149 in 2019.

In American football, passing, along with running (also referred to as rushing), is one of the two main methods of advancing the ball down the field. Passes are typically attempted by the quarterback, but any offensive player can attempt a pass provided they are behind the line of scrimmage. To qualify as a passing play, the ball must have initially moved forward after leaving the hands of the passer; if the ball initially moved laterally or backwards, the play would instead be considered a running play. The act of catching a forward pass is a reception. The number of receptions each player makes is a recorded statistic in football games. In addition to the overall National Football League (NFL) receiving champion, league record books recognize statistics from the American Football League (AFL), which operated from 1960 to 1969 before being absorbed into the NFL in 1970. The NFL also recognizes the statistics of the All-America Football Conference, which operated from 1946 to 1949 before three of its teams were merged into the NFL, since 2025. Previously, these statistics were recognized by the Pro Football Hall of Fame.

The NFL did not begin keeping official records until the 1932 season. The total receptions of the leader has increased over time due to the increase of the number of games within an NFL season as well as the increase in the prevalence of passing in the NFL. Don Hutson led the league in receptions a record eight times. The first NFL player to record over 100 receptions in a season was Art Monk in 1984; Lionel Taylor and Charlie Hennigan had accomplished the feat in the AFL in 1961 and 1964 respectively. The NFL record for single-season receptions has changed on 15 occasions, with Michael Thomas holding the current record of 149 receptions set in 2019.

== NFL annual receptions leaders ==
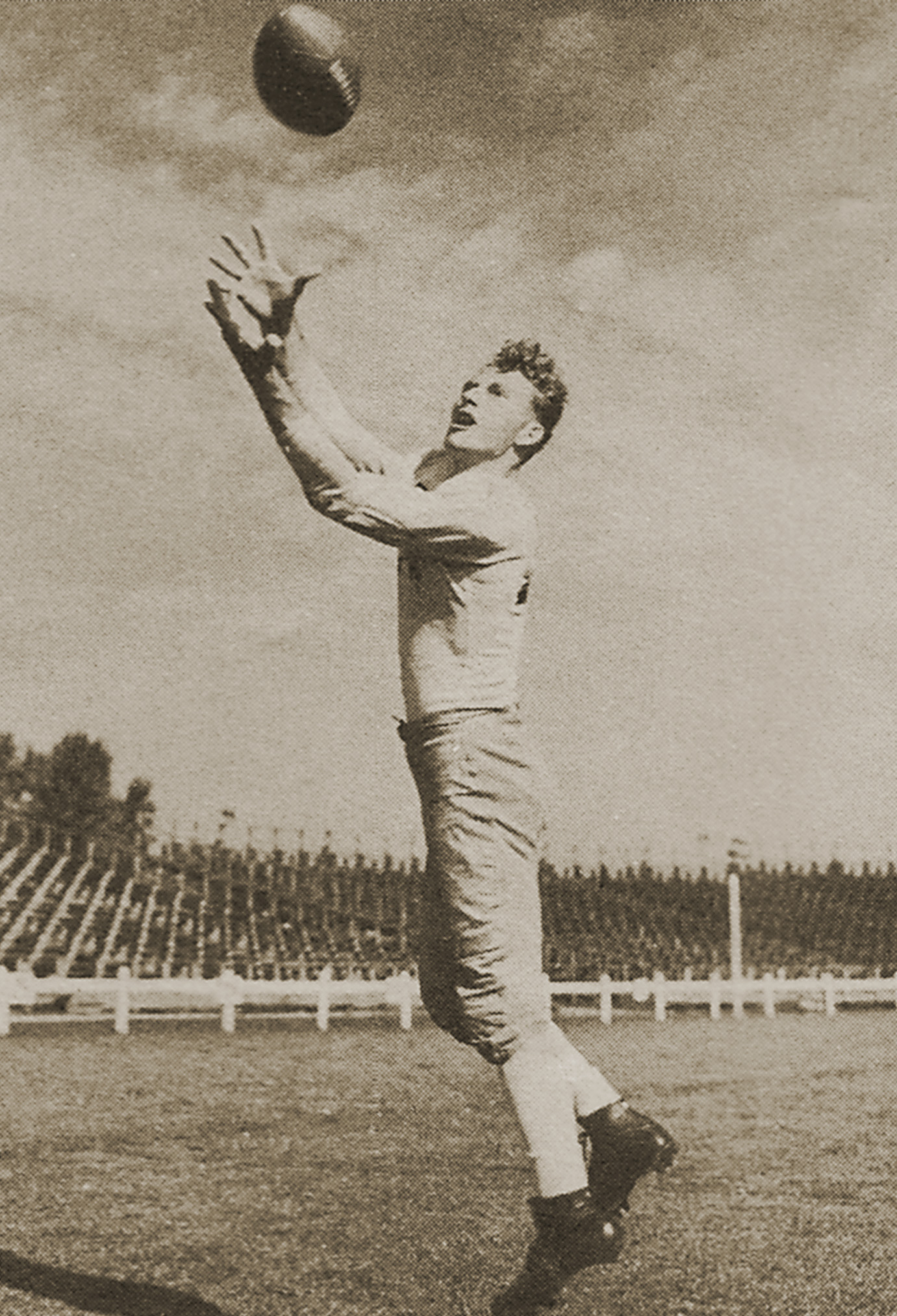
Don Hutson led the NFL in receptions a record 8 times.

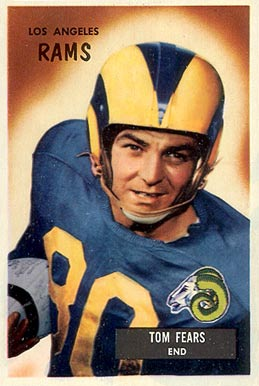
Tom Fears broke the single-season receptions record in consecutive years in 1949 and 1950.

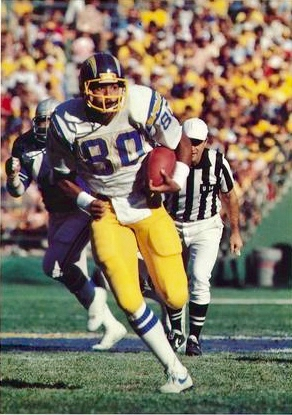
Kellen Winslow led the NFL in receptions in 1980 and 1981.

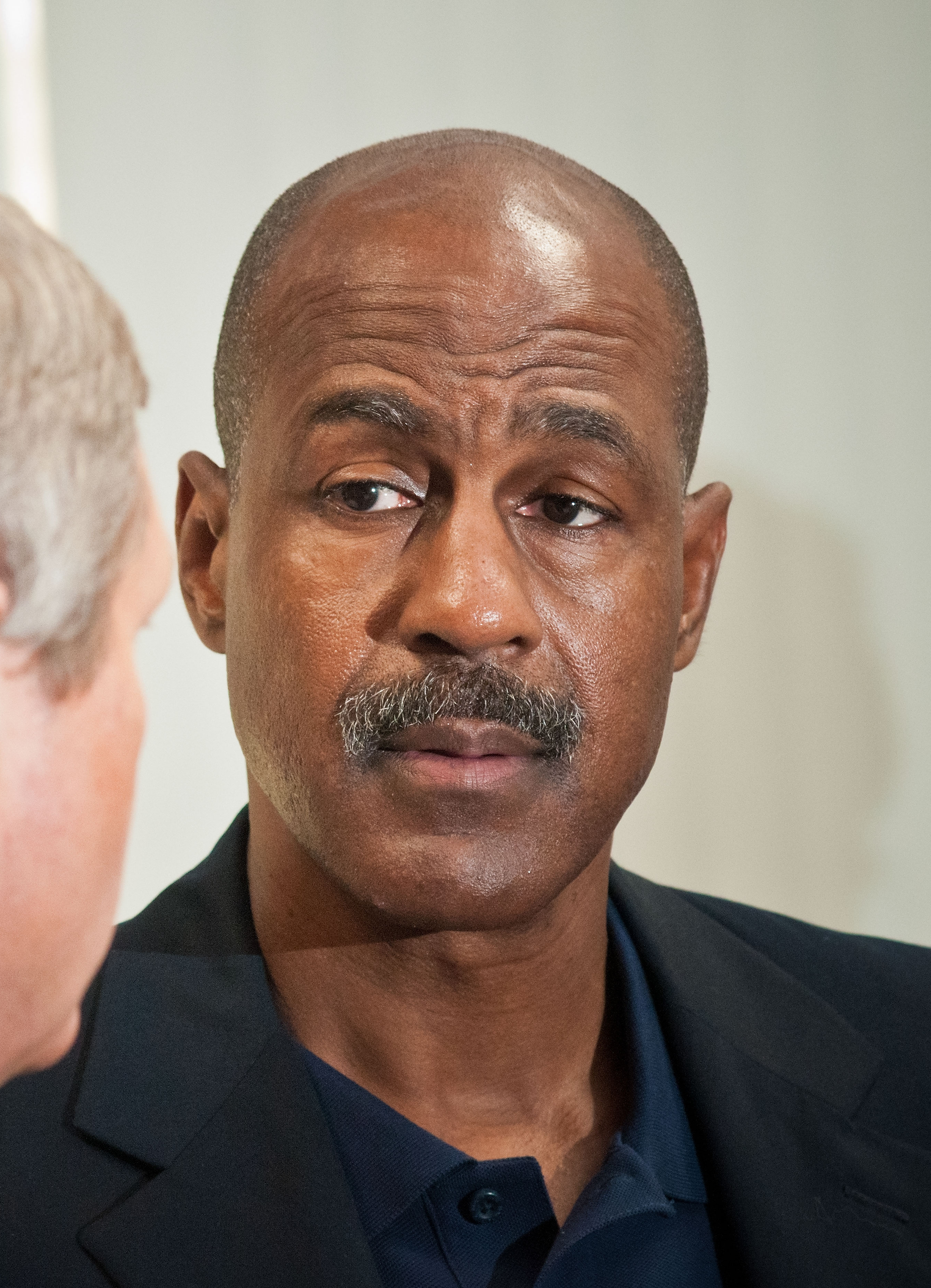
Art Monk became the first NFL player to record over 100 receptions in a season with 106 in 1984. Lionel Taylor and Charlie Hennigan had accomplished the feat in the AFL.

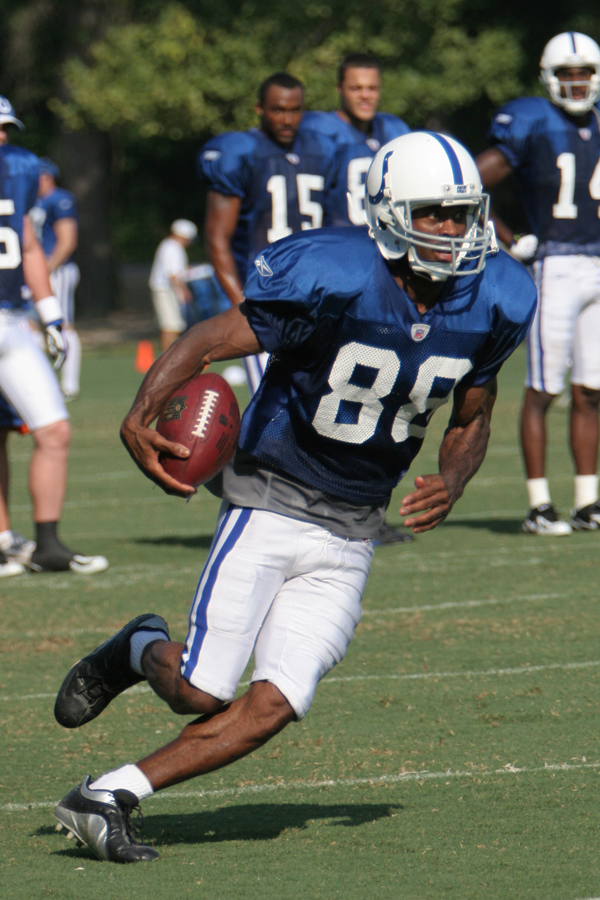
Marvin Harrison led the NFL in receptions twice in his career including a then-record 143 receptions in 2002.

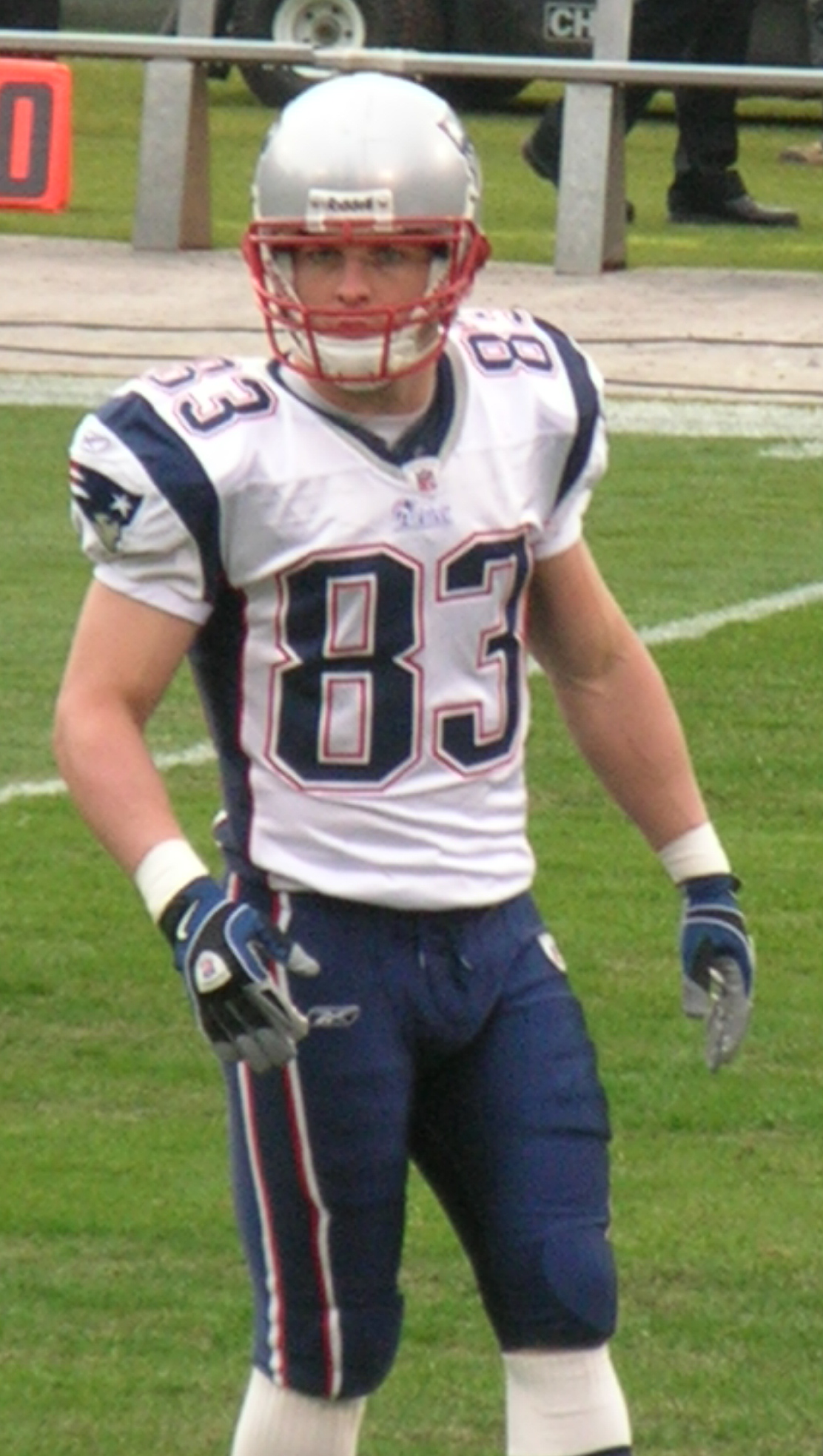
Wes Welker led the league in receptions three times in his career, the most of any player in the 21st century.

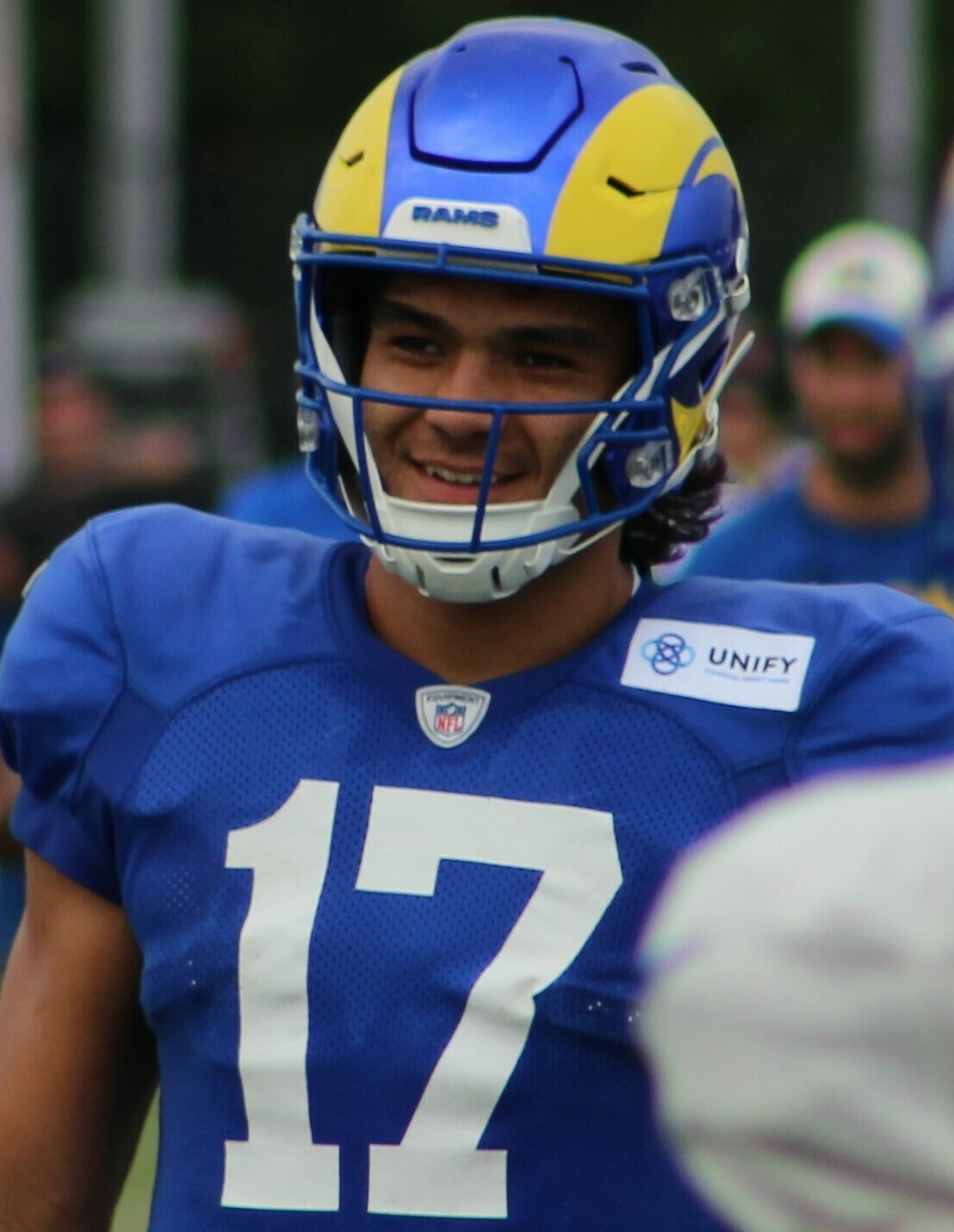
Puka Nacua is the most recent receptions leader, having led the league with 129 receptions in the 2025 season.

Key
Symbol	Meaning
Leader	The player who recorded the most receptions in the NFL
Rec	The total number of receptions the player had
GP	The number of games played by a player during the season (Note: The NFL did not have a set number of games for teams to play until the 1935 season, instead setting a minimum.)
†	Inducted into the Pro Football Hall of Fame
^	Active player
*	Set the single-season receptions record
(#)	Denotes the number of times a player appears in this list

NFL annual receptions leaders by season
Season	Leader	Rec	GP	Team	Refs
1932	Ray Flaherty†	21*	12	New York Giants	
1933	Shipwreck Kelly	22*	10	Brooklyn Dodgers	
1934	Red Badgro†	16	13	New York Giants	
1934	Joe Carter	16	11	Philadelphia Eagles	
1935	Tod Goodwin	26*	12	New York Giants	
1936	Don Hutson†	34*	12	Green Bay Packers	
1937	Don Hutson† (2)	41*	11	Green Bay Packers	
1938	Gaynell Tinsley	41	11	Chicago Cardinals	
1939	Don Hutson† (3)	34	11	Green Bay Packers	
1940	Don Looney	58*	11	Philadelphia Eagles	
1941	Don Hutson† (4)	58	11	Green Bay Packers	
1942	Don Hutson† (5)	74*	11	Green Bay Packers	
1943	Don Hutson† (6)	47	10	Green Bay Packers	
1944	Don Hutson† (7)	58	10	Green Bay Packers	
1945	Don Hutson† (8)	47	10	Green Bay Packers	
1946	Jim Benton	63	11	Los Angeles Rams	
1947	Jim Keane	64	12	Chicago Bears	
1948	Tom Fears†	51	12	Los Angeles Rams	
1949	Tom Fears† (2)	77*	12	Los Angeles Rams	
1950	Tom Fears† (3)	84*	12	Los Angeles Rams	
1951	Elroy Hirsch†	66	12	Los Angeles Rams	
1952	Mac Speedie†	62	12	Cleveland Browns	
1953	Pete Pihos†	63	12	Philadelphia Eagles	
1954	Pete Pihos† (2)	60	12	Philadelphia Eagles	
1954	Billy Wilson	60	12	San Francisco 49ers	
1955	Pete Pihos† (3)	62	10	Philadelphia Eagles	
1956	Billy Wilson (2)	60	12	San Francisco 49ers	
1957	Billy Wilson (3)	52	11	San Francisco 49ers	
1958	Raymond Berry†	56	12	Baltimore Colts	
1958	Pete Retzlaff	56	12	Philadelphia Eagles	
1959	Raymond Berry† (2)	66	12	Baltimore Colts	
1960	Raymond Berry† (3)	74	12	Baltimore Colts	
1961	Jim Phillips	78	14	Los Angeles Rams	
1962	Bobby Mitchell†	72	14	Washington Redskins	
1963	Bobby Joe Conrad	73	14	St. Louis Cardinals	
1964	Johnny Morris	93*	14	Chicago Bears	
1965	Dave Parks	80	14	San Francisco 49ers	
1966	Charley Taylor†	70	14	Washington Redskins	
1967	Charley Taylor† (2)	70	12	Washington Redskins	
1968	Clifton McNeil	71	14	San Francisco 49ers	
1969	Danny Abramowicz	73	14	New Orleans Saints	
1970	Dick Gordon	71	14	Chicago Bears	
1971	Fred Biletnikoff†	61	14	Oakland Raiders	
1972	Harold Jackson	62	14	Philadelphia Eagles	
1973	Harold Carmichael†	67	14	Philadelphia Eagles	
1974	Lydell Mitchell	72	14	Baltimore Colts	
1975	Chuck Foreman	73	14	Minnesota Vikings	
1976	MacArthur Lane	66	14	Kansas City Chiefs	
1977	Lydell Mitchell (2)	71	14	Baltimore Colts	
1978	Rickey Young	88	16	Minnesota Vikings	
1979	Joe Washington	82	15	Baltimore Colts	
1980	Kellen Winslow†	89	16	San Diego Chargers	
1981	Kellen Winslow† (2)	88	16	San Diego Chargers	
1982	Dwight Clark	60	9	San Francisco 49ers	
1983	Todd Christensen	92	16	Los Angeles Raiders	
1984	Art Monk†	106*	16	Washington Redskins	
1985	Roger Craig†	92	16	San Francisco 49ers	
1986	Todd Christensen (2)	95	16	Los Angeles Raiders	
1987	J. T. Smith	91	15	St. Louis Cardinals	
1988	Al Toon	93	15	New York Jets	
1989	Sterling Sharpe†	90	16	Green Bay Packers	
1990	Jerry Rice†	100	16	San Francisco 49ers	
1991	Haywood Jeffires	100	16	Houston Oilers	
1992	Sterling Sharpe† (2)	108*	16	Green Bay Packers	
1993	Sterling Sharpe† (3)	112*	16	Green Bay Packers	
1994	Cris Carter†	122*	16	Minnesota Vikings	
1995	Herman Moore	123*	16	Detroit Lions	
1996	Jerry Rice† (2)	108	16	San Francisco 49ers	
1997	Tim Brown†	104	16	Oakland Raiders	
1997	Herman Moore (2)	104	16	Detroit Lions	
1998	O. J. McDuffie	90	16	Miami Dolphins	
1999	Jimmy Smith	116	16	Jacksonville Jaguars	
2000	Marvin Harrison†	102	16	Indianapolis Colts	
2000	Muhsin Muhammad	102	16	Carolina Panthers	
2001	Rod Smith	113	15	Denver Broncos	
2002	Marvin Harrison† (2)	143*	16	Indianapolis Colts	
2003	Torry Holt	117	16	St. Louis Rams	
2004	Tony Gonzalez†	102	16	Kansas City Chiefs	
2005	Larry Fitzgerald†	103	16	Arizona Cardinals	
2005	Steve Smith Sr.	103	16	Carolina Panthers	
2006	Andre Johnson†	103	16	Houston Texans	
2007	T. J. Houshmandzadeh	112	16	Cincinnati Bengals	
2007	Wes Welker	112	16	New England Patriots	
2008	Andre Johnson† (2)	115	16	Houston Texans	
2009	Wes Welker (2)	123	14	New England Patriots	
2010	Roddy White	115	16	Atlanta Falcons	
2011	Wes Welker (3)	122	16	New England Patriots	
2012	Calvin Johnson†	122	16	Detroit Lions	
2013	Pierre Garçon	113	16	Washington Redskins	
2014	Antonio Brown	129	16	Pittsburgh Steelers	
2015	Antonio Brown (2)	136	16	Pittsburgh Steelers	
2015	Julio Jones	136	16	Atlanta Falcons	
2016	Larry Fitzgerald† (2)	107	16	Arizona Cardinals	
2017	Jarvis Landry	112	16	Miami Dolphins	
2018	Michael Thomas	125	16	New Orleans Saints	
2019	Michael Thomas (2)	149*	16	New Orleans Saints	
2020	Stefon Diggs^	127	16	Buffalo Bills	
2021	Cooper Kupp^	145	17	Los Angeles Rams	
2022	Justin Jefferson^	128	17	Minnesota Vikings	
2023	CeeDee Lamb^	135	17	Dallas Cowboys	
2024	Ja'Marr Chase^	127	17	Cincinnati Bengals	
2025	Puka Nacua^	129	16	Los Angeles Rams	

== AFL annual receptions leaders ==
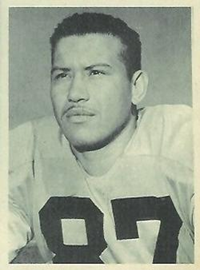
Lionel Taylor led the American Football League in receptions for five seasons. No player has led a league in receptions as many times as Taylor did since his retirement.

Key
Symbol	Meaning
Leader	The player who recorded the most receptions in the AFL
Rec	The total number of receptions the player had
GP	The number of games played by a player during the season
†	Pro Football Hall of Fame member
*	Player set the single-season receptions record
(#)	Denotes the number of times a player appears in this list

AFL annual receptions leaders by season
Season	Leader	Rec	GP	Team	Refs
1960	Lionel Taylor	92*	12	Denver Broncos	
1961	Lionel Taylor (2)	100*	14	Denver Broncos	
1962	Lionel Taylor (3)	77	14	Denver Broncos	
1963	Lionel Taylor (4)	78	14	Denver Broncos	
1964	Charlie Hennigan	101*	14	Houston Oilers	
1965	Lionel Taylor (5)	85	14	Denver Broncos	
1966	Lance Alworth†	73	13	San Diego Chargers	
1967	George Sauer	74	14	New York Jets	
1968	Lance Alworth† (2)	68	14	San Diego Chargers	
1969	Lance Alworth† (3)	64	14	San Diego Chargers	

== AAFC annual receptions leaders ==
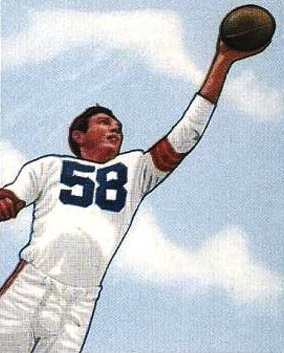
Mac Speedie led the AAFC in receptions three times in its four-year existence. In his final season as a football player in 1952, he led the NFL in receptions. Upon formal recognition of AAFC statistics by the NFL, Speedie retroactively became noted as the second player to lead a league four times in receptions in football history; only one other player has surpassed Speedie since his retirement.

Key
Symbol	Meaning
Leader	The player who recorded the most receptions in the AAFC
Rec	The total number of receptions the player had
GP	The number of games played by a player during the season
†	Pro Football Hall of Fame member
*	Player set the single-season receptions record
(#)	Denotes the number of times a player appears in this list

AAFC annual receptions leaders by season
Season	Player	Rec	GP	Team	Refs
1946	Alyn Beals	40*	14	San Francisco 49ers	
1946	Dante Lavelli†	40*	14	Cleveland Browns	
1947	Mac Speedie†	67*	14	Cleveland Browns	
1948	Mac Speedie† (2)	58	12	Cleveland Browns	
1949	Mac Speedie† (3)	62	12	Cleveland Browns	

== Most seasons leading the league ==
Count	Player	Seasons	Team	Refs
8	Don Hutson	1936, 1937, 1939, 1941–1945	Green Bay Packers	
5	Lionel Taylor	1960–1963, 1965	Denver Broncos	
4	Mac Speedie	1947–1949, 1952	Cleveland Browns	
3	Lance Alworth	1966, 1968, 1969	San Diego Chargers	
3	Raymond Berry	1958–1960	Baltimore Colts	
3	Tom Fears	1948–1950	Los Angeles Rams	
3	Pete Pihos	1953–1955	Philadelphia Eagles	
3	Sterling Sharpe	1989, 1992, 1993	Green Bay Packers	
3	Wes Welker	2007, 2009, 2011	New England Patriots	
3	Billy Wilson	1954, 1956, 1957	San Francisco 49ers	
2	Antonio Brown	2014, 2015	Pittsburgh Steelers	
2	Todd Christensen	1983, 1986	Los Angeles Raiders	
2	Larry Fitzgerald	2005, 2016	Arizona Cardinals	
2	Marvin Harrison	2000, 2002	Indianapolis Colts	
2	Andre Johnson	2006, 2008	Houston Texans	
2	Lydell Mitchell	1974, 1977	Baltimore Colts	
2	Herman Moore	1995, 1997	Detroit Lions	
2	Jerry Rice	1990, 1996	San Francisco 49ers	
2	Charley Taylor	1966, 1967	Washington Redskins	
2	Michael Thomas	2018, 2019	New Orleans Saints	
2	Kellen Winslow	1980, 1981	San Diego Chargers	

== See also ==
- List of NFL career receptions leaders
- List of NFL annual receiving yards leaders
- List of NFL annual receiving touchdowns leaders
