= List of NFL receivers who have won the triple crown =

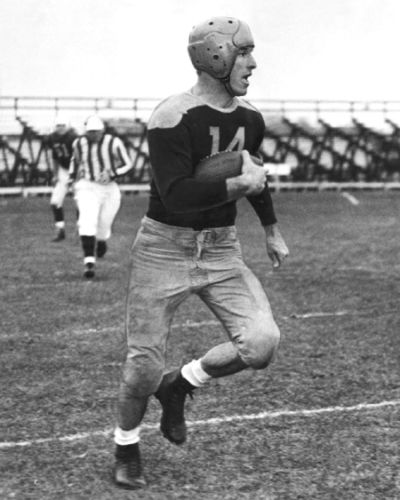
Don Hutson won four triple crowns in a row and five in total, both records.

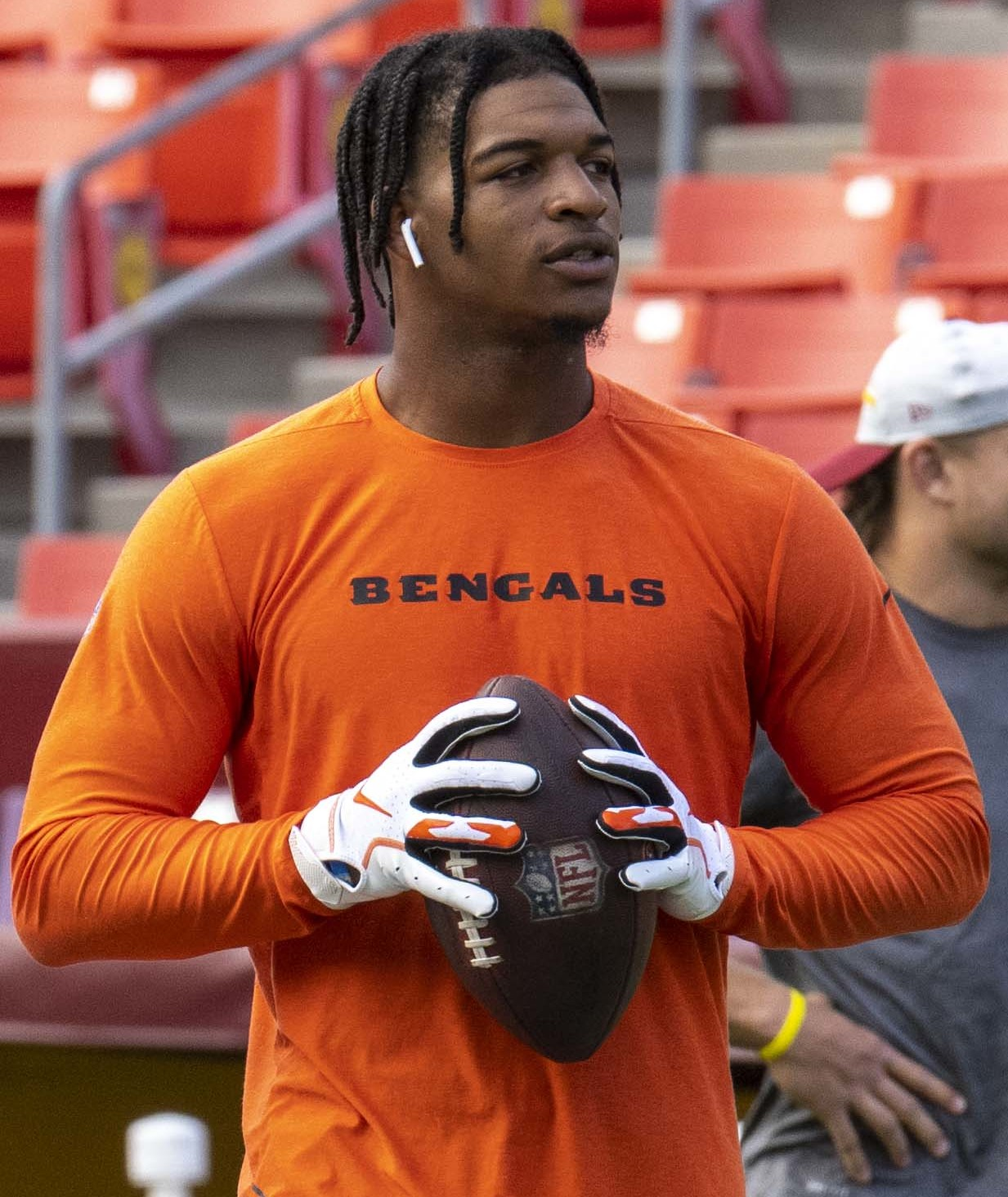
Ja'Marr Chase is the most recent triple crown winner.

In the National Football League (NFL) a receiver is said to have won the triple crown if he leads the league in receptions, receiving yards and receiving touchdowns within a particular season. Finishing joint first in any or all of those three categories is also considered sufficient. The term triple crown has been used to describe the feat at least as far back as 1990, when it was achieved by Jerry Rice.

Since the NFL began keeping statistics in 1932, the triple crown has been won seventeen times by thirteen different players. This includes one player (Lance Alworth) who did so in the American Football League (AFL), the NFL having adopted AFL records when the two leagues merged in 1970. Don Hutson of the Green Bay Packers is the only man to win more than one triple crown, having done so five times (1936, 1941–44). The most recent triple crown winner was Ja'Marr Chase of the Cincinnati Bengals, in 2024.

== NFL and AFL receivers who have won the triple crown ==
Table key
†	Indicates the player has been inducted into the Pro Football Hall of Fame
*	Active player
^{^}	NFL champions (before 1967) or Super Bowl champions (since 1967)

Receiving triple crown winners
Year	Name	Position	Team	Receptions	Yards	Touchdowns	Notes	Ref
1932	Ray Flaherty†	End	New York Giants	21	350	5		
1936	Don Hutson†	End	Green Bay Packers^{^}	34	536	8		
1941	Don Hutson† (2)	End	Green Bay Packers	58	738	10	Won the Joe F. Carr Trophy as the NFL MVP.	
1942	Don Hutson† (3)	End	Green Bay Packers	74	1,211	17	Won the Joe F. Carr Trophy as the NFL MVP. Hutson achieved more than double the numbers of his nearest competitors in all three categories.	
1943	Don Hutson† (4)	End	Green Bay Packers	47	776	11		
1944	Don Hutson† (5)	End	Green Bay Packers^{^}	58	866	9		
1951	Elroy Hirsch†	End	Los Angeles Rams^{^}	66	1,495	17		
1953	Pete Pihos†	End	Philadelphia Eagles	63	1,049	10	Tied with Billy Wilson for touchdowns.	
1959	Raymond Berry†	End	Baltimore Colts^{^}	66	959	14		
1964	Johnny Morris	Flanker	Chicago Bears	93	1,200	10	Tied with Bobby Mitchell for touchdowns. Surpassed by AFL receivers in all three categories.	
1965	Dave Parks	End	San Francisco 49ers	80	1,344	12	Tied with Bob Hayes for touchdowns. Surpassed by AFL receivers in all three categories.	
1966	Lance Alworth†	Flanker	San Diego Chargers	73	1,383	13	AFL triple crown winner. Alworth would also win the triple crown if NFL players were included, being top in receptions and yards, while tying Bob Hayes for touchdowns.	
1990	Jerry Rice†	Wide receiver	San Francisco 49ers	100	1,502	13	Voted NFL Player of the Year by the Sporting News.	
1992	Sterling Sharpe†	Wide receiver	Green Bay Packers	108	1,461	13		
2005	Steve Smith Sr.	Wide receiver	Carolina Panthers	103	1,563	12	Tied with Larry Fitzgerald for receptions; tied with Marvin Harrison for touchdowns.	
2021	Cooper Kupp*	Wide receiver	Los Angeles Rams^{^}	145	1,947	16	Voted the Associated Press NFL Offensive Player of the Year Award and the Super Bowl MVP.	
2024	Ja'Marr Chase*	Wide receiver	Cincinnati Bengals	127	1,708	17		

=== Most Triple Crown Winners ===
Count	Player	Seasons	Team
5	Don Hutson	1936, 1941, 1942, 1943, 1944	Green Bay Packers
