= Steve Smith Sr. =

American football player and broadcaster (born 1979)

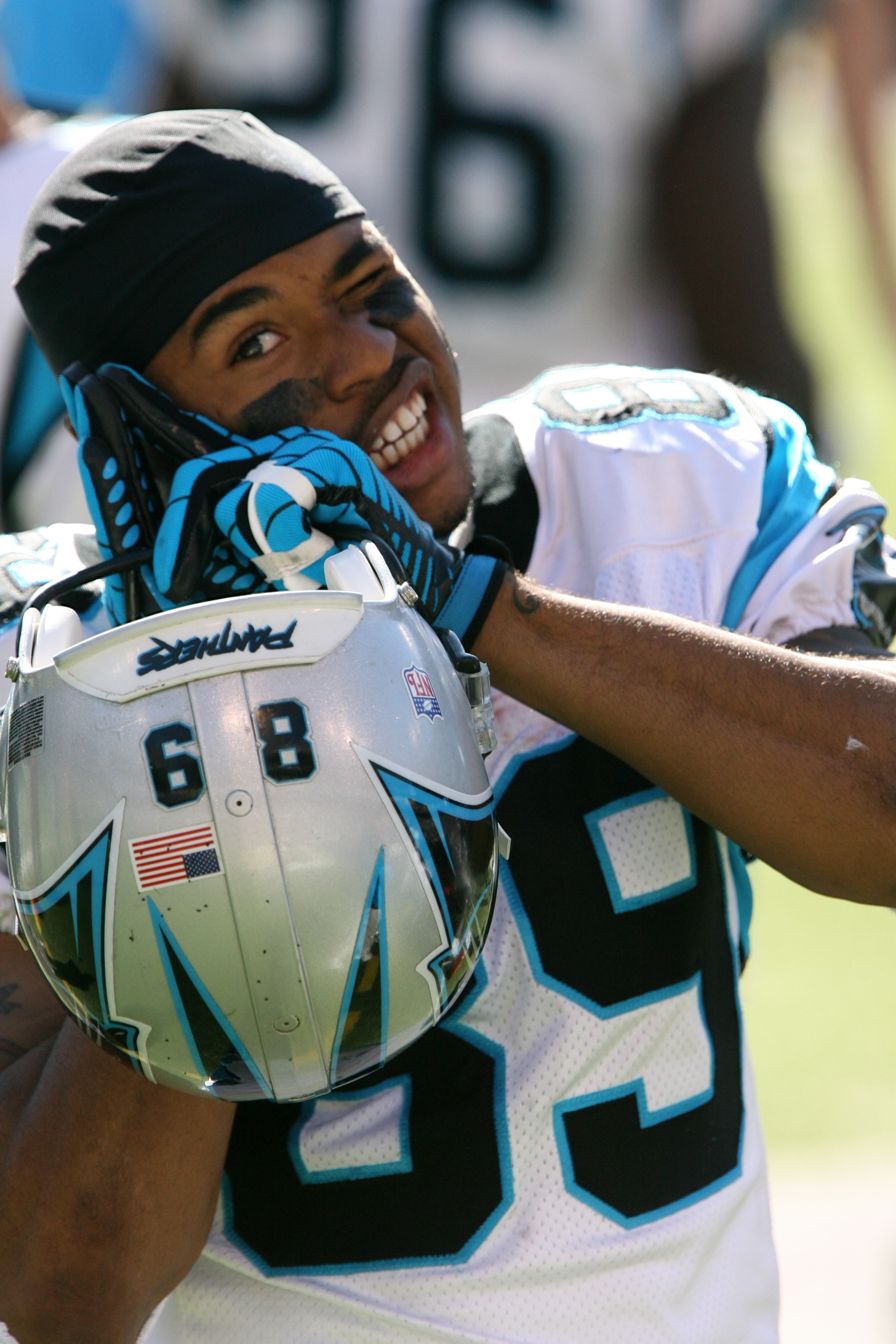
- Smith with the Carolina Panthers in 2006

No. 89
- Position: Wide receiver

Personal information
- Born: May 12, 1979 (age 47); Los Angeles, California, U.S.
- Listed height: 5 ft 9 in (1.75 m)
- Listed weight: 195 lb (88 kg)

Career information
- High school: University (Los Angeles)
- College: Santa Monica (1997–1998); Utah (1999–2000)
- NFL draft: 2001: 3rd round, 74th overall pick

Career history
- Carolina Panthers (2001–2013); Baltimore Ravens (2014–2016)

Awards and highlights
- NFL Comeback Player of the Year (2005); NFL Receiving Triple Crown (2005); 2× First-team All-Pro (2001 (Note: Selected as a kick returner), 2005); 2× Second-team All-Pro (2008, 2011); 5× Pro Bowl (2001, 2005, 2006, 2008, 2011); NFL receptions co-leader (2005); NFL receiving yards leader (2005); NFL receiving touchdowns co-leader (2005); PFWA All-Rookie Team (2001); Carolina Panthers Hall of Honor; First-team All-MW (1999); Second-team All-MW (2000)

Career NFL statistics
- Receptions: 1,031
- Receiving yards: 14,731
- Receiving touchdowns: 81
- Return yards: 4,055
- Return touchdowns: 6
- Stats at Pro Football Reference

Stevonne Latrall Smith Sr. (born May 12, 1979), better known as Steve Smith, is an American former professional football wide receiver who played in the National Football League (NFL) for 16 seasons, primarily with the Carolina Panthers. He played college football for the Utah Utes and was selected by the Panthers in the third round of the 2001 NFL draft. Smith spent 13 seasons in Carolina and three with the Baltimore Ravens. After retiring from the NFL, Smith became a sports analyst and show host for NFL Network.

A five-time Pro Bowl selection and four-time All-Pro (including a 2011 Pro Football Focus) selection. Smith emerged as one of the NFL's most productive wide receivers in history, leading the league in catches, receiving yards, and touchdowns in 2005. At the time of his retirement, Smith ranked 7th in NFL career all-purpose yards (19,180), 7th in NFL career receiving yards (14,731) (6th among wide receivers all-time), 12th in career receptions (1,031), and 25th in receiving touchdowns (81). Smith amassed (89) total touchdowns in the regular season and (100) total touchdowns including the postseason. Smith emerged as one of the most statistically efficient wide receivers of all-time, in the 2005 NFL season, Smith became the only player in NFL history to lead the league in receiving yards, receiving touchdowns and receptions (receiving triple crown) despite being on a team that was ranked (28th) in pass attempts. In the 2008 NFL season Smith became the only player in NFL history to lead the league in receiving yards per game despite being on an offense that was last in pass attempts. In 2008, Smith produced the highest yards per team pass attempt (RY/TPA) in the modern era with a rating of (4.03). Smith also has the highest yards per route run (YPRR) in NFL history with a rating of (3.87) from 2008. At the time of his retirement Smith was tied for 4th in 100-yard receiving games all-time (51) & is currently tied for 5th all-time alongside hall of famers Andre Johnson and Terrell Owens. Smith’s dominance extended into the postseason, where he holds the NFL record for the highest career receiving yards per game average (91.0) among players with a minimum of 10 playoff games and the NFL record for most receiving yards (739) through a player's first seven playoff games.

== Early life ==
Smith attended University High School in Los Angeles, and was a letterman in football and track & field. In football, he played running back and defensive back, and was an All-Metro League selection as well as an All-California Interscholastic Federation selection. Smith graduated from University High School in 1997.

In track & field, he set a handful of school records, was named as an All-City selection as a high-hurdler, and also excelled in the triple jump and 300m hurdles. He had personal-bests of 14.95 seconds in the 110m hurdles and 38.73 seconds in the 300m hurdles.

== College career ==
After graduating from high school, Smith attended Santa Monica College. While playing for the Santa Monica Corsairs football team, Smith was noticed to be a talented football player, and earned a starting position. During this time, Smith was teammates with future NFL wide receiver Chad Johnson, surprising fans of the small college team with their unexpected talents.

While impressing spectators with his performance on the football field, Santa Monica's head coach, Robert Taylor, encouraged Smith to not play for riches or fame, but to play so that he might earn a scholarship to a Division-I school, where he could receive a better education. He also advised Smith and Johnson to not do touchdown celebrations and as Smith said, "they put the cuffs on us." Smith took Taylor's advice to heart, and excelled in his academics, not missing a single day of classes while attending Santa Monica.

After completing two years at Santa Monica College, Smith transferred to the University of Utah, where he established himself as a standout wideout for the Utah Utes football team in the Mountain West Conference where he was a teammate of future NFL running back Mike Anderson. While at the University of Utah, Smith set a record for yards per catch with a 20.6 average, and was chosen to play for the conference's all-star team twice. In his first season on the team, he ranked 4th in the NCAA in both punt return yards (495) and yard per return (17.1). However, he missed their bowl game in his final season due to injury. After the Blue–Gray All-Star game on December 25, 2000, Smith began to receive attention from various NFL scouts. He was named offensive MVP of the January 13, 2001, East–West Shrine Game. Smith finished his time at Utah with 78 receptions for 1,608 yards and 12 touchdowns, with another 1,365 return yards and 4 touchdowns on special teams.

He and his wife have endowed an athletics scholarship at the University of Utah.

== Professional career ==
Pre-draft measurables
Height	Weight	Arm length	Hand span	40-yard dash	10-yard split	20-yard split	20-yard shuttle	Three-cone drill	Vertical jump	Broad jump
5 ft 9 in (1.75 m)	184 lb (83 kg)	31 1/2 in (0.80 m)	9 1/4 in (0.23 m)	4.41 s	1.51 s	2.51 s	4.25 s	7.44 s	38.5 in (0.98 m)	10 ft 1 in (3.07 m)
All values from NFL Combine

=== Carolina Panthers ===
==== 2001 season ====
The Carolina Panthers chose Smith in the third round (74th overall) during the 2001 NFL draft.

Smith spent a majority of his rookie season as a kick and punt returner, leading all rookies in net yardage with 1,994 yards, and landing in fourth place among all NFL players behind Priest Holmes, Marshall Faulk, and Derrick Mason. In his first play as a professional, Smith returned the opening kickoff of the first game of the season for a touchdown. Smith also had ten catches for 154 yards, and rushed four times for 43 yards.

However, the team finished 1–15, winning only their season opener against the Minnesota Vikings. He was named to the NFL All-Rookie Team. He earned first team All-Pro and Pro Bowl honors.

==== 2002 season ====
During the 2002 NFL season, Smith earned a starting position as a wide receiver and continued as the team's kick returner and punt returner. In Week 4, in a road game against the Green Bay Packers, he had five receptions for 116 yards for his first game going over 100 yards. On November 18, 2002, Smith attacked practice squad player Anthony Bright during a film session after Bright asked for a play to be shown again, which angered Smith. Bright was hospitalized for two days while Smith was arrested and charged with misdemeanor assault. Teammate Isaac Byrd visited Bright in the hospital and said "Half [his] face was swollen and his left eye was closed ... you'd have thought there was a bulldozer in Steve's fist." Smith was suspended for one game by the Panthers. In Week 14, he had five receptions for 144 yards and a receiving touchdown to go with two punt return touchdowns in the 52–31 win over the Cincinnati Bengals. He earned NFC Special Teams Player of the Week for his game against the Bengals. Smith finished the 2002 season with 54 receptions for 872 yards and three touchdowns. His 55 punt returns and two punt return touchdowns led the NFL.

==== 2003 season and Super Bowl XXXVIII ====
During the 2003 season, Smith played a critical role for the Panthers offense and helped lead them to their first NFC title in franchise history. In a Week 7 loss to the Tennessee Titans, he had ten receptions for 151 yards and a touchdown. He finished the regular season with 88 receptions for 1,110 yards and seven touchdowns. He eclipsed the 1,000 receiving yards mark for the first time in his career in 2003.

In the Wild Card Round, Smith had five receptions for 135 yards and a touchdown in the 29–10 win over the Dallas Cowboys. During the NFC divisional playoffs, Smith caught a 69-yard pass and ran it for a touchdown in the second overtime period to defeat the St. Louis Rams 29–23. He finished that game with six catches, 163 yards, and the one touchdown. In Super Bowl XXXVIII, he caught four passes for 80 yards and a touchdown, and returned a kickoff for 30 yards in the Panthers' 32–29 loss to the New England Patriots.

==== 2004 season and injury ====
Smith suffered a broken leg during the 2004 NFL season opener against the Green Bay Packers, and was out for the remainder of the year. Before the injury, he managed to record six catches for 60 yards, and even attempted a pass which fell incomplete.

==== 2005 season and comeback ====
In Week 1, Smith had eight receptions for 138 yards and a touchdown in a loss to the New Orleans Saints. In Week 3, he had 11 receptions for 170 yards and three touchdowns in a 27–24 loss to the Miami Dolphins. In Week 5 against the Arizona Cardinals, he had eight receptions for 119 yards and two touchdowns in the 24–20 win. In Week 6, on the road against the Detroit Lions, he had six receptions for 123 yards and a touchdown in the 21–20 win. In Week 8, he had 11 receptions for 201 yards and a touchdown in the 38–13 win over the Minnesota Vikings. He was named NFC Offensive Player of the Month for October. In Week 11 against the Chicago Bears, he had 14 receptions for 169 yards in a 13–3 loss. In Week 17 against the Atlanta Falcons, he had nine receptions for 131 yards and a touchdown in the 44–11 win. In the 2005 NFL season, Smith recovered from his injury to have the best season of his career. He earned the "Triple Crown" of receiving, leading the NFL in receptions (103), receiving yards (1,563), and receiving touchdowns (12) and became only the third player, after Jerry Rice (1990) and Sterling Sharpe (1992), to accomplish this feat in the Super Bowl era. Smith also returned 27 punts for 286 yards. His 10.6 yards/punt return was the second-highest of his career, after his 10.7 yards/punt return in his rookie season.

Smith dominated the first two rounds of the 2005–06 NFL playoffs. In a Wild Card Round victory over the New York Giants, Smith caught 10 passes for 84 yards and a touchdown, and rushed for 12 yards and another score. The Panthers then defeated the Chicago Bears in the divisional round, aided by Smith's franchise record 12 receptions for 218 yards and two touchdowns. Smith and the Panthers then faced the Seattle Seahawks in the NFC Championship. Although he scored on a 59-yard punt return, Smith was held to 33 receiving yards on five catches, and the Panthers lost by a score of 34–14.

For the second time, Smith was named first team All-Pro. Smith, along with teammates Jake Delhomme, Julius Peppers, and Mike Wahle were invited to the 2006 Pro Bowl after the season. Smith also shared the 2005 NFL Comeback Player of the Year Award with New England Patriots' linebacker Tedy Bruschi.

==== 2006 season ====
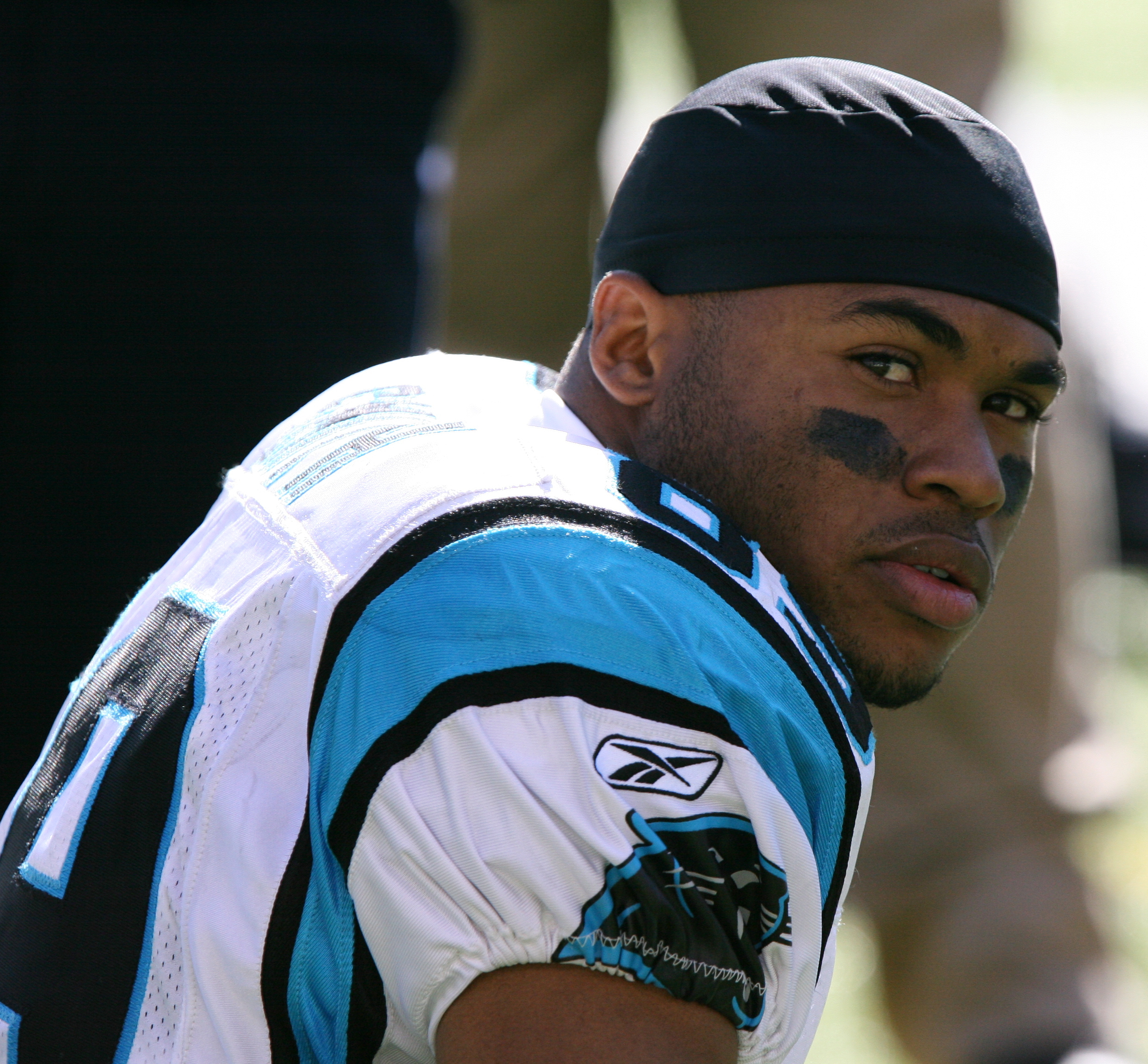
Smith with the Carolina Panthers in October 2006

After suffering a hamstring injury and developing an ingrown toenail in training camp before the 2006 season, Smith returned to the field after missing two weeks of action. Smith returned in Week 3 and had seven receptions for 112 yards in a 26–24 win over the Tampa Bay Buccaneers. He had eight receptions for 189 yards and a touchdown in Week 6 against the Baltimore Ravens, a 23–21 win. In the following game, he had eight receptions for 126 yards in a 17–14 loss to the Cincinnati Bengals. In Week 10, against the Tampa Bay Buccaneers, he had eight receptions for 149 yards and a touchdown in a 24–10 win. In Week 17, against the Panthers, he had two receiving touchdowns in a 31–21 win. Smith was double covered frequently but still managed to battle through that and injuries to finish the year with 83 catches for 1,186 yards and eight touchdowns. He was also invited to the 2007 Pro Bowl, his second Pro Bowl in a row and third overall. His contract ran up after the season. On March 1, he signed an extension.

==== 2007 season ====
By May 4, he signed a new extension worth $45 million for six years. He started out the season with seven receptions for 118 yards and a touchdown in a 27–13 win over the St. Louis Rams. He had eight receptions for 153 yards and three touchdowns in a Week 2 loss to the Houston Texans. He had ten receptions for 136 yards and one touchdown in a 25–10 road win over the Arizona Cardinals. He had nine receptions for 137 yards and a touchdown in Week 16 against the Dallas Cowboys. Smith started 15 games for the Panthers during their 2007 season, and led Carolina with 87 catches, 1,002 receiving yards, and seven touchdowns despite playing with four different starting quarterbacks due to injury to starting quarterback Jake Delhomme.

==== 2008 season ====
Smith made headlines during the 2008 training camp when he was involved in an altercation with teammate Ken Lucas on August 1, 2008. Smith broke Lucas's nose during the fight and was later sent home for the remainder of the day after reportedly apologizing. Smith was given a two-game suspension by the team. Smith then suffered a severe concussion during the 2008 preseason opener against the Indianapolis Colts, where Smith was hit in the head when catching a pass. He continued to play that game, but did not travel with the team to their next game against the Philadelphia Eagles. After returning from suspension and scoring his first touchdown of the 2008 season, Smith presented the ball to Lucas on the sideline.

In Week 7, against the Saints, Smith had six receptions for 122 yards and a touchdown in the 30–7 victory. In Week 8, a 27–23 win over the Cardinals, he had five receptions for 117 yards and two touchdowns. In Week 12, a 45–28 road loss to the Falcons, he had eight receptions for 168 yards. In Week 15, against the Broncos, he had nine receptions for 165 yards and a touchdown in the 30–10 win. In Week 17, against the Saints, he had five receptions for 134 yards and a touchdown in the 33–31 win.

Despite his two-game suspension, Smith was voted to play in the 2009 Pro Bowl after he managed to catch 78 passes for 1,421 receiving yards and six touchdowns, leading the NFL in receiving yards per game. He had a receiving touchdown in the Panthers' Divisional Round loss to the Cardinals.

==== 2009 season ====
In Week 2, against the Atlanta Falcons on the road, Smith had eight receptions for 131 yards in a 28–20 win. In Week 15, he had nine receptions for 157 yards and a touchdown in a 26–7 win over the Vikings. During Week 16, he broke his left forearm on a touchdown catch in a game against the New York Giants causing him to sit out the final game of the year. Smith finished the year with 982 yards on 65 receptions and sven touchdowns, just 18 yards shy of a fifth consecutive 1,000 yard receiving season. On January 1, 2010, Smith was placed on injured reserve following the injury, and on June 19, 2010, Smith broke his arm again while playing flag football.

==== 2010 season ====
2010 was Smith's worst season as a starter since 2002. Although he led the team in both receptions and receiving yards, he only managed 46 catches for 554 yards. In addition, he only caught two touchdown passes. Smith's low numbers were due to the total lack of team offense behind rookie quarterback Jimmy Clausen. The Panthers finished last in most offensive categories and with a 2–14 record, which was the worst in the 2010 season, securing the first overall pick in the 2011 NFL draft. Smith's dissatisfaction led to widespread rumors amongst the Panthers fan base that the star receiver wanted to be traded from the team for the 2011 season.

==== 2011 season ====
Smith opened up the 2011 season strong, gaining 178 yards and two touchdowns on eight catches, including a 77-yard reception for a touchdown. Smith followed his week 1 performance with another 150-yard receiving game, but had a fumble during the game as well in the 30–23 loss to the Green Bay Packers. During Week 14, he became the 35th player in NFL history to reach the 10,000-yard receiving mark after a 125-yard performance against the Atlanta Falcons. He had eight receptions for 181 yards in a 34–29 loss to the Chicago Bears in Week 4. He had seven receptions for 143 yards in a 33–20 win over Washington in Week 7. Smith reached a total of 1,394 yards on 79 catches, and was one catch away from reaching the 700 receptions mark. Smith was selected to his fifth Pro Bowl. He was ranked 35th by his fellow players on the NFL Top 100 Players of 2012.

==== 2012 season ====
Prior to the season, he signed a three-year extension worth $18 million. Smith played in all 16 games in 2012, recording 73 receptions for 1,174 yards and four touchdowns. He had five games on the season going over 100 receiving yards. He was ranked 84th by his fellow players on the NFL Top 100 Players of 2013.

==== 2013 season ====
"I don't know. You go and ask him, 'cause he didn't finish the game. Ice up, son. Ice up."

— Smith, in response to his scuffles with Patriots cornerback Aqib Talib during a game.

In 2013, Smith continued to play well, despite hauling in only 64 receptions, his lowest since 2010. On December 22, 2013, Smith received a PCL sprain against the New Orleans Saints. The Panthers came out on top of the Saints 17–13. Smith received his 800th reception in the 2013 season.

Smith was released by the Panthers on March 13, 2014. The Panthers have not reissued his #89 jersey since then; while it has not been formally retired, it is understood that no Panther will ever wear it again.

=== Baltimore Ravens ===
==== 2014 season ====
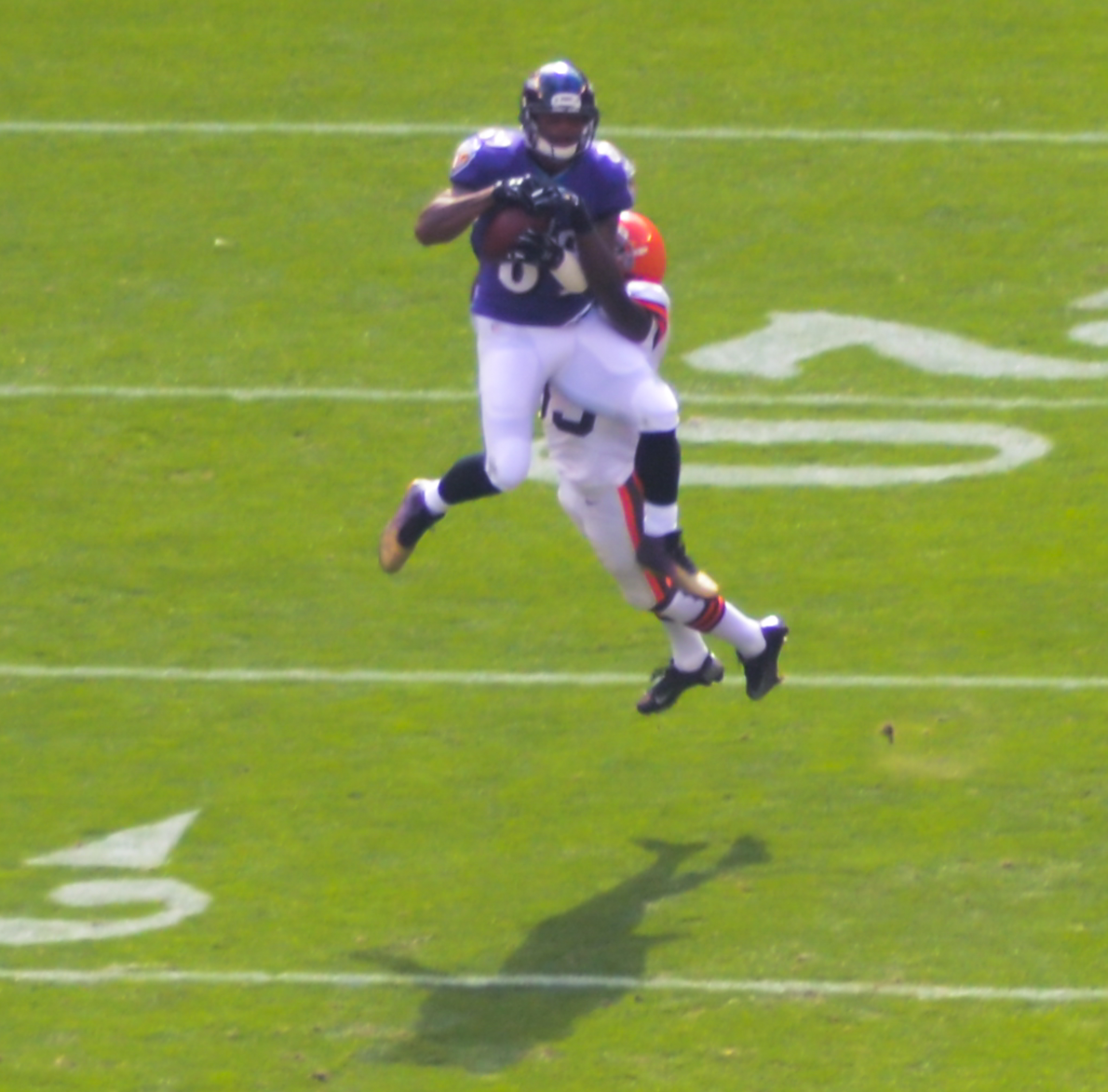
Smith catching a pass for the Baltimore Ravens in a game against the Cleveland Browns in September 2014

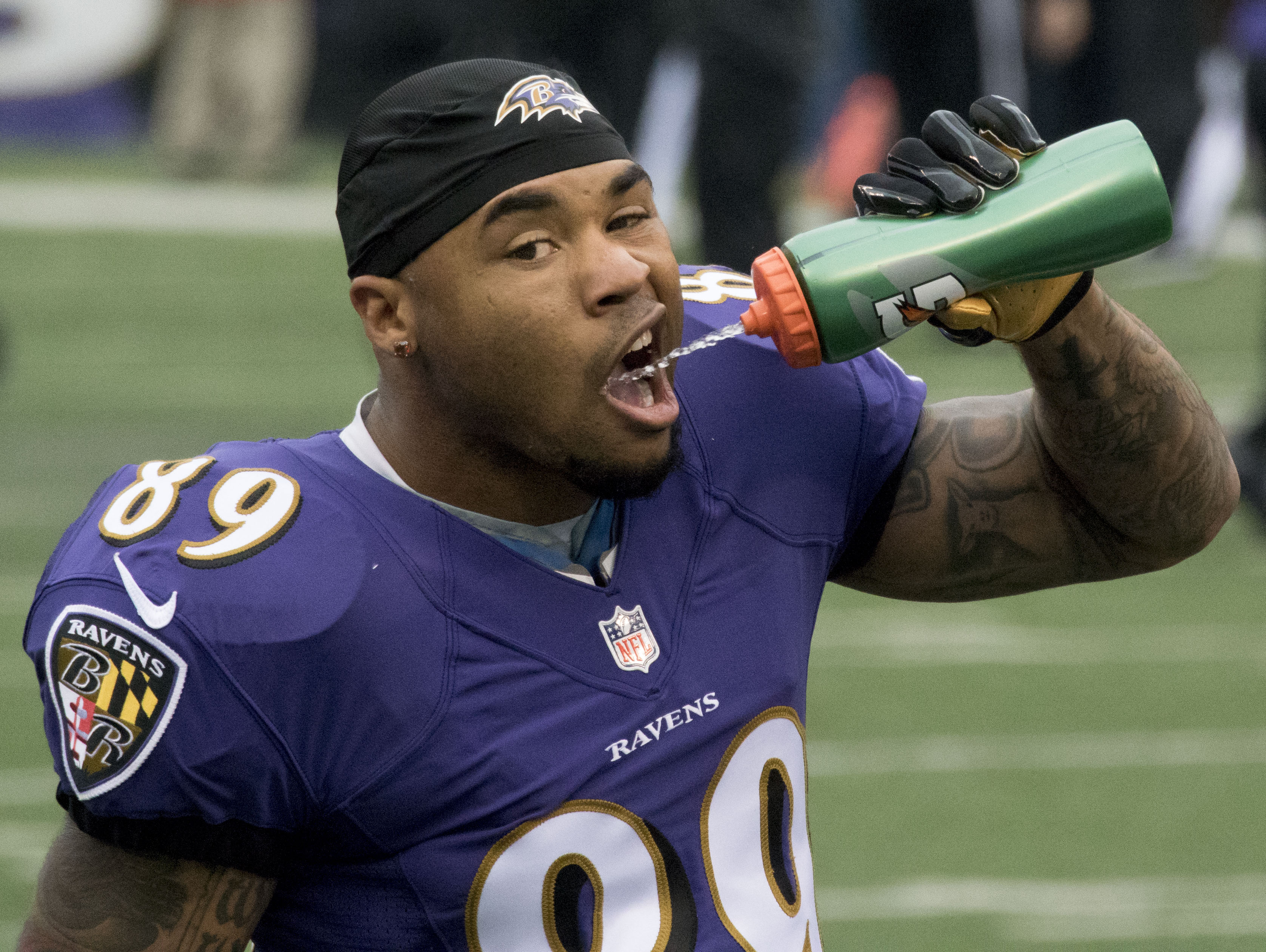
Smith with the Ravens in 2014

Prior to signing with the Ravens, Smith stated that if he happens to meet his former team, the Panthers, again, to "put your goggles on cause there's going to be blood and guts everywhere." On March 14, 2014, Smith signed a three-year contract with the Baltimore Ravens, worth $11.5 million with a $3.5 million bonus. In the Ravens' season opener against the Cincinnati Bengals, Smith caught 7 passes for 118 yards and an 80-yard touchdown, but the Ravens lost the game 23–16. In Week 3 against the Cleveland Browns, Smith caught 5 passes for 101 yards, including a 32-yard reception that set up the game-winning field goal, as the Ravens won 23–21.

In Week 4, Smith faced his old team. On the Ravens' second possession of the game, quarterback Joe Flacco threw a pass which was tipped by Owen Daniels and landed in the arms of Smith, who took the ball to the end zone for a 61-yard touchdown. Later in the game, Flacco fumbled a snap. He picked up the ball and threw a pass to a covered Smith, who caught it in the back of the end zone, despite being held by cornerback Melvin White. Smith finished the game with 7 catches for 139 yards and two touchdowns as the Ravens defeated the Panthers 38–10.

In Week 6, Smith caught a 56-yard touchdown pass in a game in which Flacco threw a career-high five touchdown passes and set the record for the fastest time to throw them (16:03). In addition to the 56 yard score, Smith recorded 5 total catches for 110 yards. In Week 15, Smith caught his 900th career reception against the Jacksonville Jaguars, as the Ravens won 20–12. In Week 17, Smith reached the single-season 1,000-yard mark for the eighth time in his career. In that game, the Ravens defeated the Cleveland Browns 20–10 and clinched a playoff berth.

Smith finished the 2014 regular season with 79 receptions, 1,065 yards and 6 touchdowns. He also fumbled twice and lost one. In the wild card round of the playoffs, Smith caught five passes for 101 yards as the Ravens defeated the division rival Pittsburgh Steelers for the first time ever in the playoffs. In the divisional round of the playoffs, Smith caught three passes for 44 yards and a touchdown, as the Ravens lost and had their season ended by the eventual Super Bowl XLIX champion New England Patriots. He was ranked 54th by his fellow players on the NFL Top 100 Players of 2015.

==== 2015 season ====
During a press conference on August 10, 2015, Smith announced the upcoming season would be his last.

During the Ravens' third preseason game, against the Redskins, Smith was ejected along with cornerback Chris Culliver. Smith's son went to Twitter, saying, "1st time I've ever gotten to watch a game with my dad. Thanks @NFL". The Ravens' Twitter account tweeted that Smith was ejected for a skirmish, and his son responded to it by saying, "Actually got ejected for ballin too hard". Smith was named starting punt returner after Week 1; at 36, he was and is among the oldest punt returners in league history. He had ten receptions for 150 yards in a 37–33 loss to the Oakland Raiders. In the following game, he had 13 receptions for 186 yards and two touchdowns in a 28–24 loss to the Bengals. In the Ravens' first win against the Pittsburgh Steelers in Week 4, he was forced to leave the game in third quarter due to a lower back injury he suffered after a hit from linebacker Lawrence Timmons. Two days later, it was announced that Smith broke four of his ribs in the Week 4 game. He returned in Week 6 and had seven receptions for 137 yards and a touchdown in the 25–20 loss to the 49ers.

In a Week 8 game against the San Diego Chargers, Smith tore his achilles tendon, and it was announced he would be out for the rest of the 2015 season. He ended the season having played seven games, racking up 46 catches for 670 yards and three touchdowns.

On December 30, 2015, Smith announced that he would be returning to the Ravens for the 2016 season.

==== 2016 season ====
Smith had another solid year with the Ravens, he caught 70 passes for 799 yards and five touchdowns. In Week 4, against Oakland, he had eight receptions for 111 yards and a touchdown. In the game, Smith passed Andre Johnson to become the NFL's active leader in receiving yards. Smith reached the 1,000 reception mark, the 14th player to reach this milestone. On January 2, 2017, Smith officially announced his retirement from the NFL. He retired with 1,031 receptions (then 12th all-time) for 14,731 yards (7th) and 81 touchdowns (tied for 17th with Art Powell).

== Career statistics ==
=== NFL ===
Legend
	Led the league
**Bold**	Career high

Regular season statistics
Year	Team	Games		Receiving					Rushing					Punt returns					Kickoff returns					Fumbles	
Year	Team	GP	GS	Rec	Yds	Avg	Lng	TD	Att	Yds	Avg	Lng	TD	Ret	Yds	Avg	Lng	TD	Ret	Yds	Avg	Lng	TD	Fum	Lost
2001	CAR	15	1	10	154	15.4	33	0	4	43	**10.8**	**39**	0	34	364	10.7	70	1	**56**	**1,431**	25.6	**99**	**2**	**8**	**3**
2002	CAR	15	13	54	872	16.1	69	3	1	−4	−4.0	−4	0	**55**	**470**	8.5	**87**	**2**	26	571	22.0	51	0	5	**3**
2003	CAR	16	11	88	1,110	12.6	67	7	**11**	42	3.8	14	0	44	439	10.0	53	1	11	309	**28.1**	42	0	5	0
2004	CAR	1	1	6	60	10.0	15	0	—	—	—	—	—	0	0	—	—	0	—	—	—	—	—	0	0
2005	CAR	16	16	**103**	**1,563**	15.2	**80**	**12**	4	25	6.3	20	**1**	27	286	10.6	44	0	3	61	20.3	33	0	2	1
2006	CAR	14	14	83	1,166	14.0	72	8	8	61	7.6	24	**1**	9	30	3.3	16	0	2	−1	−0.5	3	0	2	0
2007	CAR	15	15	87	1,002	11.5	74	7	9	**66**	7.3	22	0	2	7	3.5	6	0	—	—	—	—	—	1	1
2008	CAR	14	14	78	1,421	**18.2**	65	6	5	40	8.0	23	0	1	10	10.0	10	0	—	—	—	—	—	1	1
2009	CAR	15	15	65	982	15.1	66	7	5	22	4.4	17	0	—	—	—	—	—	—	—	—	—	—	1	0
2010	CAR	14	14	46	554	12.0	39	2	1	9	9.0	9	0	6	46	7.7	32	0	—	—	—	—	—	3	2
2011	CAR	16	16	79	1,394	17.6	77	7	6	56	9.3	23	0	—	—	—	—	—	—	—	—	—	—	3	2
2012	CAR	16	16	73	1,174	16.1	66	4	3	27	9.0	15	0	—	—	—	—	—	—	—	—	—	—	1	1
2013	CAR	15	15	64	745	11.6	44	4	—	—	—	—	—	—	—	—	—	—	—	—	—	—	—	0	0
2014	BAL	16	16	79	1,065	13.5	**80**	6	—	—	—	—	—	—	—	—	—	—	—	—	—	—	—	2	1
2015	BAL	7	7	46	670	14.6	50	3	—	—	—	—	—	2	32	**16.0**	22	0	—	—	—	—	—	0	0
2016	BAL	14	14	70	799	11.4	52	5	—	—	—	—	—	—	—	—	—	—	—	—	—	—	—	0	0
Career		219	198	1,031	14,731	14.3	80	81	57	387	6.8	39	2	180	1,684	9.4	87	4	98	2,371	24.2	99	2	34	15

Playoff statistics
Year	Team	Games		Receiving					Rushing					Punt returns					Kickoff returns					Fumbles	
Year	Team	GP	GS	Rec	Yds	Avg	Lng	TD	Att	Yds	Avg	Lng	TD	Ret	Yds	Avg	Lng	TD	Ret	Yds	Avg	Lng	TD	Fum	Lost
2003	CAR	4	4	18	**404**	**22.4**	**70**	**3**	1	7	7.0	7	0	**4**	15	3.8	7	0	**2**	**41**	**20.5**	**30**	0	0	0
2005	CAR	3	3	**27**	335	12.4	58	**3**	**4**	**38**	**9.5**	**22**	**1**	3	**58**	**19.3**	**59**	**1**	—	—	—	—	—	**1**	**1**
2008	CAR	1	1	2	43	21.5	35	1	—	—	—	—	—	—	—	—	—	—	—	—	—	—	—	0	0
2013	CAR	1	1	4	74	18.5	31	1	—	—	—	—	—	—	—	—	—	—	—	—	—	—	—	0	0
2014	BAL	2	2	8	145	18.1	40	1	—	—	—	—	—	—	—	—	—	—	—	—	—	—	—	0	0
Career		11	11	59	1,001	17.0	70	9	5	45	9.0	22	1	7	73	10.4	59	1	2	41	20.5	30	0	1	1

=== College ===
Year	Team	Receiving				Punt returns				Kickoff returns			
Year	Team	Rec	Yds	Avg	TD	Ret	Yds	Avg	TD	Ret	Yds	Avg	TD
1999	Utah	43	860	20.0	8	29	495	17.1	3	6	169	28.2	0
2000	Utah	35	743	21.2	4	43	365	8.5	1	17	336	19.8	0
Career		78	1,603	20.6	12	72	860	11.9	4	23	505	22.0	0

== Career highlights ==
=== Awards and honors ===
NFL

- NFL Comeback Player of the Year (2005)
- NFL Receiving Triple Crown (2005)
- 2× First-team All-Pro (2001, 2005)
- 2× Second-team All-Pro (2008, 2011)
- 5× Pro Bowl (2001, 2005, 2006, 2008, 2011)
- NFL receptions co-leader (2005)
- NFL receiving yards leader (2005)
- NFL receiving touchdowns co-leader (2005)
- PFWA All-Rookie Team (2001)
- 3× NFL Top 100 — 35th (2012), 84th (2013), 54th (2015)
- NFC Player of the Month (October 2005)
- Carolina Panthers Hall of Honor

College

- First-team All-MW (1999)
- Second-team All-MW (2000)

Other

- North Carolina Sports Hall of Fame

=== Records ===
==== NFL records ====
- Highest punt return average in a single game: 51.0 (December 8, 2002, vs Cincinnati Bengals)
- Smith became the only player in NFL history to lead the league in receiving yards, receiving touchdowns and receptions (receiving triple crown) despite being on a team that was ranked (28th) in pass attempts.
- In the 2005 playoffs, Smith earned the NFL record for most receptions in a single postseason (27), which stood until 2007.
- In 2008, Smith became the only player in history to lead the league in receiving yards per game despite being on an offense that was last in pass attempts.
- Smith has the highest yards per team pass attempt (RY/TPA) in the modern era with a rating of (4.03) from 2008.
- Smith has the highest yards per route run (YPRR) in NFL history with a rating of (3.87) from 2008.
- Smith has the highest career receiving yards per game (YPG) average in the postseason (minimum 10 games) in NFL history (91.0).
- Smith holds the NFL record for most receiving yards (739) through a player's first seven playoff games.
- Smith and Hall of Famer Tim Brown are the only players in NFL history who have at least 1,000 receptions and have scored touchdowns on runs, catches, punt returns and kick returns.
- Smith is one of only three players in history to run back two punts for touchdowns and catch a touchdown pass in the same game.

==== Panthers franchise records ====
As of 2017's NFL off-season, Smith held at least 72 Panthers records, including:

- Receptions, career (836), season (103 in 2005), game (14 on November 20, 2005, at Chicago), playoffs (51), playoff season (27 in 2005), playoff game (12 on January 15, 2006, at Chicago)
- Receiving yards, career (12,197), season (1,563 in 2005), game (201 on October 30, 2005, against Minnesota), playoffs (856), playoff season (404 in 2003), game (218 on January 15, 2006, at Chicago)
- Yards per reception, career (14.6)
- Receiving touchdowns, career (67), game (3, twice; with Muhsin Muhammad x2), playoffs (8), playoff season (3 in 2003 and 2005), playoff game (2 on January 15, 2006, at Chicago; with Kelvin Benjamin)
- Receiving yards per game, career (67.0), season (101.5 in 2008), playoffs (95.1), playoff season (111.7 in 2005)
- Total touchdowns, career (75), playoffs (10), playoff season (5 in 2005), playoff game (2 on January 8, 2006, at the New York Giants and January 15, 2006, at Chicago; with three other players)
- Yards from scrimmage: career (12,584), playoffs (901), playoff season (411 in 2003), playoff game (244 on January 15, 2006, at Chicago)
- All-Purpose yards: career (16,607), season (1,994 in 2001), game (313 on December 8, 2002, at Cincinnati), playoffs (1,015), playoff season (467 in 2003), playoff game (243 on January 15, 2006, at Chicago), rookie season (1,994), rookie game (269 on November 11, 2001, at St. Louis)
- Kickoff return yards, game (252 on November 11, 2001, at St. Louis)
- Kickoff return touchdowns, season: 2 (2001; with Michael Bates)
- Punt returns: career (178), season (55 in 2002), game (9 on September 15, 2002, against Detroit), playoff game (3 on January 3, 2004, against Dallas; with Ted Ginn Jr.)
- Punt return yards: career (1,652), game (153 on December 8, 2002, against Cincinnati), playoffs (73), playoff season (58 in 2005), and playoff game (59 on January 22, 2006, at Seattle)
- Yards per punt return: game (51.0 on December 8, 2002, against Cincinnati), playoffs (10.43), playoff game (4.33 on January 3, 2004, against Dallas)
- Punt return touchdowns: career (4), season and game (2 on December 8, 2002, against Cincinnati), and only Panther with a postseason punt return touchdown (January 22, 2006, at Seattle)
- Total return yards: career (4,023), season (1,795 in 2001), game (206 on October 14, 2001, against New Orleans)
- Games with 100+ receiving yards: career (46), season (10 in 2005), playoffs (3)
- Games with 1+ TD scored: career (71), season (12 in 2005), playoffs (8)
- Games with 2+ TD scored: career (11; with DeAngelo Williams), season (5 in 2005; with Muhsin Muhammad and DeAngelo Williams), playoffs (2)
- Games with 3+ TD scored: career (3; with DeAngelo Williams)
- Seasons with 1,000+ receiving yards: 7

==== Ravens franchise records ====
- Receptions per game, career (5.3), season (6.6 in 2015)
- Receiving yards per game, season (95.7 in 2015)

=== Milestones ===
- In 2001, Smith was the first rookie to make the Pro Bowl as a special teams player since Tyrone Hughes in 1993.
- In 2003, Smith's 404 postseason receiving yards were the second most ever at the time (behind Jerry Rice's 409 in 1988).
- In 2005, Smith became the first player since Washington Redskins' receiver Art Monk in 1984 to lead the NFL in receptions for a team that ran more often than it passed.
- In 2005, Smith earned the NFL's receiving "triple crown", leading the league in receptions (103), receiving yards (1,563) and receiving touchdowns (12).
- In 2005 Smith led the league in yards after catch (YAC) with (816) yards.
- In 2005 Smith led the league in yards per touch (Y/Tch) with (14.8).
- In 2005 Smith led the league in receiving yards per team pass attempt (RY/TPA) with a rating of (3.48).
- In the 2005 playoffs, Smith earned the NFL record for most receptions in a single postseason (27), Which stood until 2007.
- In 2008, Smith became the only player in history to lead the league in receiving yards per game despite being on an offense that was last in pass attempts.
- In the 2008 NFL season Smith led the league with 23 catches of 20 yards or more.
- In 2008, Smith finished sixth in Offensive Player of the Year Voting
- Smith has the highest receiving yards per team pass attempt (RY/TPA) in the modern era with a rating of (4.03) from 2008.
- Smith has the highest yards per route run (YPRR) in NFL history with a rating of (3.87) from 2008.
- Smith led the NFL in receiving yards per game in the 2008 NFL season.
- From 2005–2006, Smith ranked 2nd in the NFL in total receiving yards, receptions, and receiving touchdowns.
- Between 2005-2008 Smith had the highest receiving yards per game average in the NFL."NFL receiving yards per game leaders (2005–2008)". StatMuse.
- From 2005–2008, Smith ranked 2nd in total receiving yards and 4th in receiving touchdowns league‑wide.
- Smith had the most 100-yard receiving games in the NFL between 2005-2009 with (27) and 2005-2012 with (38).
- From 2005 to 2012, Smith recorded the most 150‑plus‑yard receiving games in the NFL over that span.
- From 2005–2012, Smith ranked 3rd in the NFL in total receiving yards over that eight‑year span.
- In 2011 Smith led the league in receiving yards per team pass attempt (RY/TPA) with a rating of (2.69).
- From 2000 to 2016, Steve Smith led the NFL in total receiving yards over that span.
- Smith has the highest career receiving yards per game (YPG) average in the postseason (minimum 10 games) in NFL history (91.0).
- Smith holds the NFL record for most receiving yards (739) through a player's first seven playoff games.
- Smith amassed 1,001 postseason receiving yards, 59 receptions, and 11 total touchdowns in 11 postseason games.
- Smith and Hall of Famer Tim Brown are the only players in NFL history who have at least 1,000 receptions and have scored touchdowns on runs, catches, punt returns and kick returns.
- Smith is one of only three players in history to run back two punts for touchdowns and catch a touchdown pass in the same game.
- Caught his 1,000th career reception on November 20, 2016, in a game against the Dallas Cowboys.
- Smith is currently tied for 5th all-time in 100-yard receiving games in the regular season with (51).

== Broadcasting career ==
One month after retiring from the NFL, Smith signed a multi-year contract to appear as an analyst on multiple shows on NFL Network.

Before the 2021 Carolina Panthers season, Smith joined the Panthers' broadcast team to call preseason games. It was Smith's first time calling a game live.

Beginning in 2022, Smith has hosted NFL's Most Interesting Jobs, a series for the NFL's YouTube channel. Smith visits each NFL team to showcase the work being done by support staff, including the Minnesota Vikings' chef and nutritionist, the New York Giants' coaching staff, the Los Angeles Rams' equipment room, the Buffalo Bills' strength and conditioning staff, and the Kansas City Chiefs' kicking game ball crew.

In 2023, on his podcast, Cut to It, Smith referred to Jerry Jeudy of the Denver Broncos as "JAG", for "just a guy", an average player. Smith appeared as a pregame analyst for the Broncos' game at the Chiefs in October 2023, and attempted to approach Jeudy to apologize, but Jeudy swore at Smith and refused to engage with him. In response, Smith ranted about Jeudy on NFL Network, calling him "mentally unable to handle constructive criticism", and advised other teams not to trade for him. The rant went viral. Dez Bryant called Smith's on-air rant "completely unacceptable." On a later appearance on The Pat McAfee Show, Smith apologized to Jeudy.

== Personal life ==
In May 2008, Smith announced that he purchased a near-50% interest in the Velocity Sports Performance franchise in Charlotte and an equal ownership percentage in any future Charlotte area Velocity centers.

Smith is an Evangelical Christian. In 2007, Smith went on an evangelism trip to Togo and Nigeria to talk to soccer players about Jesus.

Before every away game, Smith and his family donated shoes to the homeless. He would also wash their feet beforehand. His goal is to hand out half a million pairs of shoes. To provide this service Smith works with Samaritan's Feet. He says, "This is an opportunity for me to give back, to serve....to kind of, really for me, open up the next chapter of my life." Smith planned to take the initiative global after retiring from football.

Smith and his wife, Angie, have four children: Peyton, Baylee, Boston, and Steve Jr.; Smith changed the name on the back of his jersey to Smith Sr. when Steve Jr., nicknamed "Deuce", was born.

On June 14, 2017, it was reported by The Charlotte Observer that he secretly paid the full college tuition of Twitter personality and author Elexus Jionde. He said of paying for her $40,000 a year education at Ohio State: "It's not about taking and how much can you get for yourself. It's about your life and (taking advantage of) all the resources and applying them and then paying it forward to someone else."

In 2019, Smith played for the "Home" roster during the NBA All-Star Celebrity Game at the Bojangles' Coliseum in Charlotte, North Carolina. The roster was made up of celebrities with Carolina roots.

On July 9, 2019, the Panthers announced that Smith would be inducted into the team's Hall of Honor along with Jake Delhomme, Jordan Gross, and Wesley Walls.

A social-media exposé was released on February 22, 2025, that accused Steve Smith of having an affair with a member of the Marching Ravens, the official marching band of the Baltimore Ravens, whom Smith played for in the final three seasons of his career. Tony Martinez, the husband of the woman Smith allegedly had an affair with, exposed intimate text messages between Smith and his wife in a post on X. Martinez then recorded a phone call he made to Smith confronting him about the affair and accusing him of having sexual relations with his wife; in it, Smith says, "I'm sorry", before going silent.

== See also ==
- List of National Football League annual receptions leaders
- List of National Football League annual receiving touchdowns leaders
- List of National Football League annual receiving yards leaders
- List of National Football League career all-purpose yards leaders
- List of National Football League career receptions leaders
- List of National Football League career receiving yards leaders
- List of National Football League career receiving touchdowns leaders
