= Ja'Marr Chase =

American football player (born 2000)

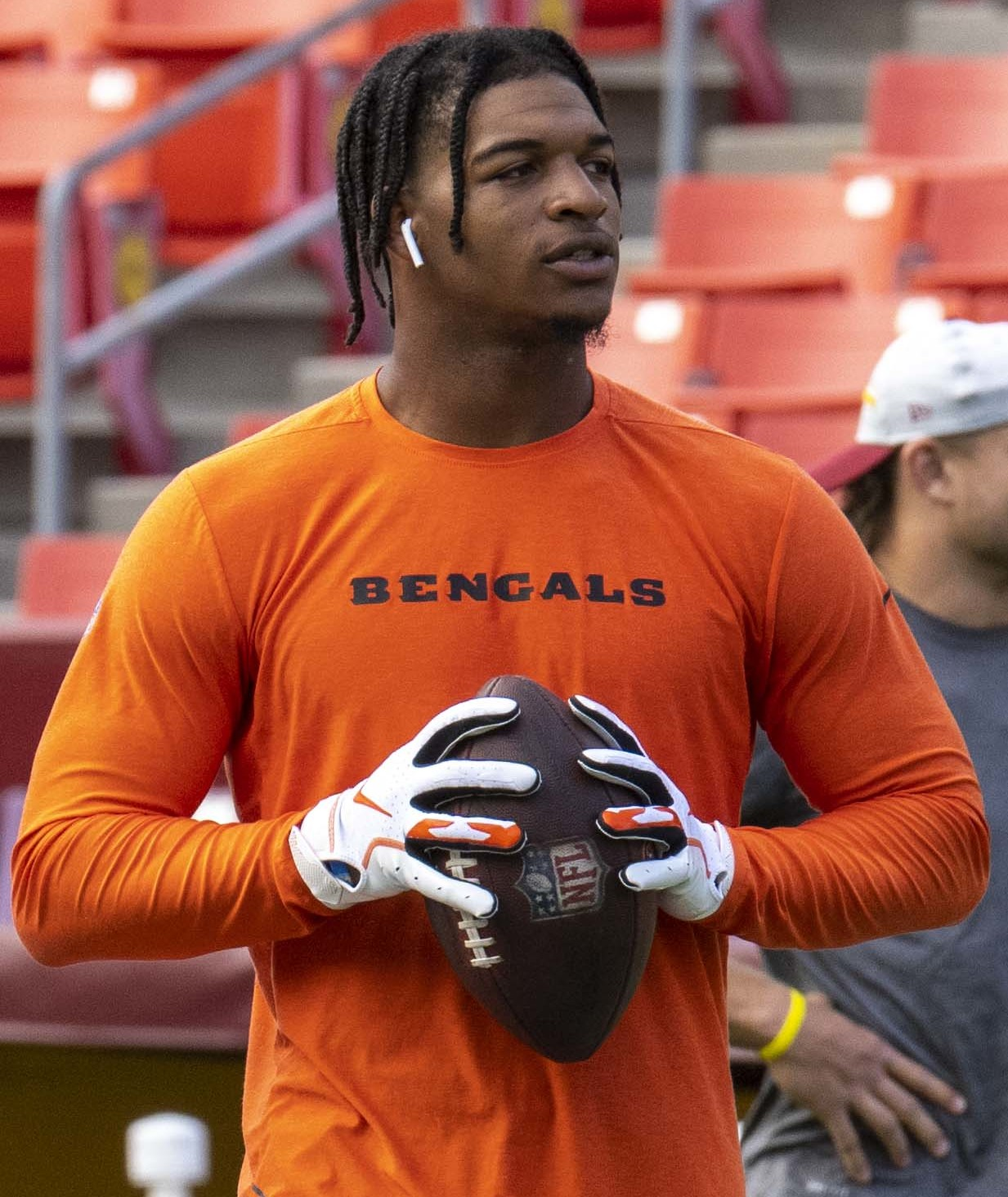
- Chase with the Cincinnati Bengals in 2021

No. 1 – Cincinnati Bengals
- Position: Wide receiver
- Roster status: Active

Personal information
- Born: March 1, 2000 (age 26); Harvey, Louisiana, U.S.
- Listed height: 6 ft 0 in (1.83 m)
- Listed weight: 207 lb (94 kg)

Career information
- High school: Archbishop Rummel (Metairie, Louisiana)
- College: LSU (2018–2020)
- NFL draft: 2021: 1st round, 5th overall pick

Career history
- Cincinnati Bengals (2021–present)

Awards and highlights
- NFL Offensive Rookie of the Year (2021); 2× First-team All-Pro (2024, 2025); Second-team All-Pro (2021); 5× Pro Bowl (2021–2025); NFL receptions leader (2024); NFL receiving yards leader (2024); NFL receiving touchdowns leader (2024); PFWA All-Rookie Team (2021); CFP national champion (2019); Fred Biletnikoff Award (2019); Unanimous All-American (2019); NCAA receiving yards leader (2019); NCAA receiving touchdowns leader (2019); First-team All-SEC (2019)

Career NFL statistics as of Week 10, 2026
- Receptions: 584
- Receiving yards: 7,715
- Receiving touchdowns: 61
- Stats at Pro Football Reference

Ja'Marr Anthony Chase (born March 1, 2000) is an American professional football wide receiver for the Cincinnati Bengals of the National Football League (NFL). He played college football for the LSU Tigers, where he won the Fred Biletnikoff Award and the 2020 College Football Playoff National Championship as a sophomore. Selected fifth overall by the Bengals in the 2021 NFL draft, Chase was named the NFL Offensive Rookie of the Year and a second-team All-Pro after setting the rookie record for single-game receiving yards en route to an appearance in Super Bowl LVI. In 2024, Chase became the fifth player in the Super Bowl era to win the receiving triple crown, leading the league in receptions, receiving yards, and receiving touchdowns.

== Early life ==
A native of Harvey, Louisiana, Chase attended Archbishop Rummel High School in Metairie, Louisiana, located in suburban New Orleans. During his career, he had 115 receptions for 2,152 yards and 30 touchdowns. Coming out of high school, Chase was a 4 star recruit ranked the nation's 84th overall recruit and number 15 receiver prospect. After initially committing to the University of Kansas, and then the University of Florida, Chase committed to Louisiana State University (LSU) to play college football.

== College career ==
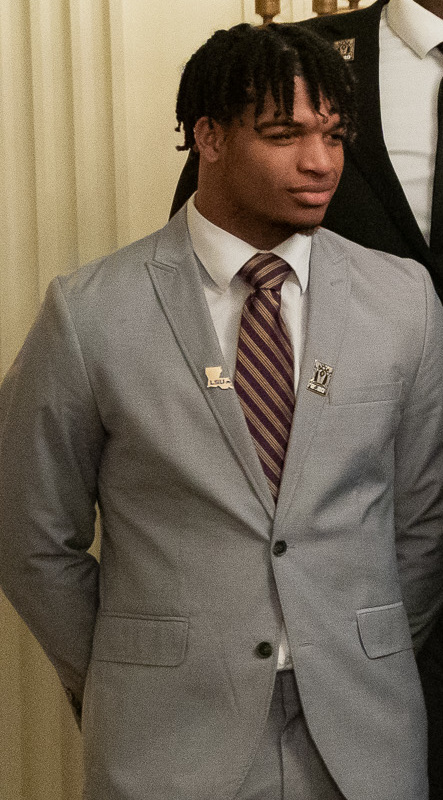
Chase at the White House, 2020

As a true freshman at LSU in 2018, Chase played in all 13 games and made eight starts. He finished the season with 23 receptions for 313 yards and three touchdowns.

Chase returned as a starter in 2019, and that year led the FBS in receiving yards with 1,780 yards on 84 catches (21.2 avg) and 20 receiving touchdowns. His 20 receiving touchdowns set a Southeastern Conference (SEC) record until it was broken by DeVonta Smith the following year. Six times he eclipsed the 100-yard mark and an additional three times he eclipsed 200 receiving yards in a game mark, including a College Football Playoff championship game-record 221 yards against Clemson. LSU finished the year undefeated and won the College Football Playoff National Championship. At the end of the regular season, Chase was awarded the Fred Biletnikoff Award as the best receiver in college football. He was also named a unanimous All-American.

A month before the start of the 2020 season, Chase announced that he was opting out to concentrate on his NFL career. His decision was reportedly not specifically due to the COVID-19 pandemic at the time, but rather due to agents having convinced him to sit out his third collegiate season so to not get injured. Chase was assured he would be a top draft pick before the season started. NFL rules state a player can not be drafted until three years after leaving high school.

== Professional career ==
=== Pre-draft ===
Pre-draft measurables
Height	Weight	Arm length	Hand span	Wingspan	40-yard dash	10-yard split	20-yard split	20-yard shuttle	Three-cone drill	Vertical jump	Broad jump	Bench press
6 ft 0 3/8 in (1.84 m)	201 lb (91 kg)	30 3/4 in (0.78 m)	9 5/8 in (0.24 m)	6 ft 2 7/8 in (1.90 m)	4.38 s	1.59 s	2.51 s	3.99 s	7.00 s	41.0 in (1.04 m)	11 ft 0 in (3.35 m)	23 reps
All values from Pro Day

=== 2021 ===
Chase was drafted by the Cincinnati Bengals fifth overall in the 2021 NFL draft, reuniting him with his college quarterback Joe Burrow. He became the first player in franchise history to wear the number 1, which was his number in college. Chase signed his four-year rookie contract, worth $30.8 million, on June 2, 2021.

Despite early struggles in the preseason, Chase played his first career regular season game on September 12, 2021, against the Minnesota Vikings, finishing with 102 receiving yards and a touchdown as the Bengals won 27–24 in overtime. Chase caught an additional three touchdown passes over his next two games, making him the youngest player in NFL history to catch four touchdown passes in his first three career games. Chase was named the NFL Rookie of the Month for September after totaling 220 receiving yards and four touchdowns through his first three games.

During the Bengals' 25–22 overtime loss to the Green Bay Packers, Chase had 159 yards, including a 70-yard touchdown at the end of the first half, earning him another Rookie of the Week award. During Week 7 against the Baltimore Ravens, Chase finished with 201 receiving yards, including an 82-yard touchdown in the Bengals 41–17 win, earning him his first AFC Offensive Player of the Week award. His 754 receiving yards set an NFL record for the most receiving yards ever by a player in their first seven career games. On December 22, Chase was announced as a selection for the 2022 Pro Bowl.

In Week 17, against the Kansas City Chiefs, Chase totaled 266 receiving yards and three touchdowns during the Bengals' 34–31 division-clinching win. He was named AFC offensive player of the week, his second of the season. Chase's 266 yards not only set a Bengals franchise record for single-game receiving yards, but it also set an NFL record for most receiving yards in a game by a rookie. In Week 18 against the Cleveland Browns, Chase caught two passes for 26 yards before leaving the game, surpassing the Bengals franchise record set by Chad Johnson for most receiving yards in a single season. Overall, Chase finished his rookie regular season with 81 receptions for 1,455 yards (4th in the NFL) and 13 receiving touchdowns (3rd). He was named Offensive Rookie of the Year by the Associated Press and the PFWA. He was named the Sporting News Rookie of the Year as well. He was named to the PFWA All-Rookie Team.

In the Wild Card Game against the Las Vegas Raiders, Chase had nine receptions for 116 receiving yards and three carries for 23 yards, helping the Bengals win their first playoff game since the 1990 season. In the Divisional Round against the Tennessee Titans, Chase recorded five receptions for 109 receiving yards, making him the youngest player in NFL history to record multiple 100-yard receiving games in a single postseason, helping the Bengals win their first-ever playoff game on the road. In the AFC Championship Game, Chase caught six passes for 54 yards and a touchdown in the 27–24 overtime win against the Chiefs, helping the Bengals advance to Super Bowl LVI, their first Super Bowl appearance since Super Bowl XXIII in 1988. In the Super Bowl, Chase caught 5 passes for 89 yards, but lost 23–20. Chase's 368 postseason receiving yards set a rookie record, breaking the previous record of 242 set by Torry Holt in the 1999 season. He was ranked 24th by his fellow players of the NFL Top 100 Players of 2022.

=== 2022 ===
In Week 1, against the Pittsburgh Steelers, Chase caught ten passes for 129 yards and a game-tying touchdown with no time left in regulation, in the 23–20 overtime loss. In Week 6, Chase had his best performance of the season, making seven receptions for 132 yards and two second-half touchdowns in a 30–26 comeback victory against the New Orleans Saints. During this game, Chase suffered a hairline fracture in his hip during a tackle in the end zone. Chase still played the following week against the Atlanta Falcons where he had another two-touchdown game, finishing with 130 yards and eight receptions in the Bengals 35–17 win. Chase left the game right before halftime after aggravating the injury he suffered the previous week. He was ruled out for the next five weeks.

Chase returned in Week 13 against the Kansas City Chiefs, making eight receptions for 97 yards. The next week against the Cleveland Browns, Chase had his final 100-yard game, finishing with ten receptions for 109 yards, and a touchdown. Chase was selected to the Pro Bowl for the second consecutive year on December 22. Despite missing four games from the injury, Chase still finished the season as the team's leader in receptions (87) and receiving yards (1,046),

In the Bengals' Wild Card Round playoff win over the Baltimore Ravens, he was the game's leading receiver with nine receptions for 84 yards and a touchdown. In the Divisional Round game against the Buffalo Bills, Chase caught five passes for 61 yards and a touchdown in the 27–10 victory. He was ranked 39th by his fellow players on the NFL Top 100 Players of 2023.

=== 2023 ===
Chase began the season with a combined 70 yards on ten receptions in the Bengals' Week 1 and 2 losses to the Browns and Ravens. He bounced back in Week 3 on Monday Night Football against the Los Angeles Rams, with 12 receptions for 141 yards in the 19–16 win. After a game against the Tennessee Titans in Week 4, Chase gave a viral postgame locker room interview stating "I'm open, I'm always fucking open". Chase responded the following week against the Arizona Cardinals by delivering his second best personal performance to date, with 192 yards and three touchdowns on 15 receptions, setting a new Bengals franchise record for single-game receptions, which was previously set by Carl Pickens in Week 6 of the 1998 season; the Bengals went on to win 34–20. He was named AFC Offensive Player of the Week for his game against the Cardinals. He had another 100-yard game with one touchdown in the Bengals' 31–17 win over the San Francisco 49ers in Week 8.

Chase injured his back during the Bengals' Week 9 victory over the Buffalo Bills on an awkward landing after an attempted diving catch. Nonetheless, he played the next week against the Houston Texans, going for 124 yards on six catches, scoring one touchdown in the 30–27 loss. In Week 13 against the Jacksonville Jaguars, Chase pulled in 11-of-12 targets for 149 yards, his second best performance of the season, with a highlight of a 76-yard touchdown during the first drive of the second quarter of the 34–31 win. Chase also eclipsed the 1,000-yard mark on the season during this game, making it his third straight season over 1,000 yards.

During the Week 15 game against the Minnesota Vikings, Chase injured his shoulder and left the game during the fourth quarter. He was diagnosed with a sprained AC joint and was said to be "day-to-day" by Bengals head coach Zac Taylor. After an MRI, Chase's injury was found to be significantly worse, leading him to miss the following week's game against the Pittsburgh Steelers. He finished the season with 100 receptions for 1,216 yards and seven touchdowns. He earned Pro Bowl honors for the third consecutive season. He was ranked 45th by his fellow players on the NFL Top 100 Players of 2024.

=== 2024 ===
On April 24, 2024, the Bengals picked up the fifth-year option on Chase's contract. Chase had a highly publicized "hold-in" during the team's training camp, in hopes that the Bengals would sign him to an extension. They were unable to come to an agreement, and Chase began the season as the starting wide receiver. He did, however, sign an endorsement deal with 7-Eleven to sell merchandise on his slogan "Always Open"—a pun to both his elusiveness with defenders as well as 7-Eleven's decades-long hours of operations. Ironically, 7-Eleven doesn't have any of its namesake stores in Greater Cincinnati, though it did close on its acquisition of Speedway—the dominant convenience store chain in the area—shortly after the Bengals drafted Chase.

He scored his first touchdown of the season in Week 3 against the Washington Commanders. Chase finished the game with two touchdowns and 118 yards, his first 100-yard game of the season. In Week 5 against the Ravens, he had ten receptions for 193 yards and two touchdowns, in the Bengals' 41–38 loss. In Week 10 against the Ravens, Chase finished with 11 receptions, 264 yards, and three touchdowns in a 35–34 loss. He became the first player in NFL history to record multiple games of 250-plus receiving yards and two-plus touchdowns. In Week 14, Chase recorded 14 catches for 177 yards and two touchdowns in a 27–20 win over the Dallas Cowboys, earning AFC Offensive Player of the Week. Chase won the 2024 triple crown after leading the league in receptions (127), receiving yards (1,708), and receiving touchdowns (17). He earned first team All Pro honors for the first time. He earned Pro Bowl honors for the fourth consecutive year. He was ranked fourth by his fellow players on the NFL Top 100 Players of 2025.

=== 2025 ===
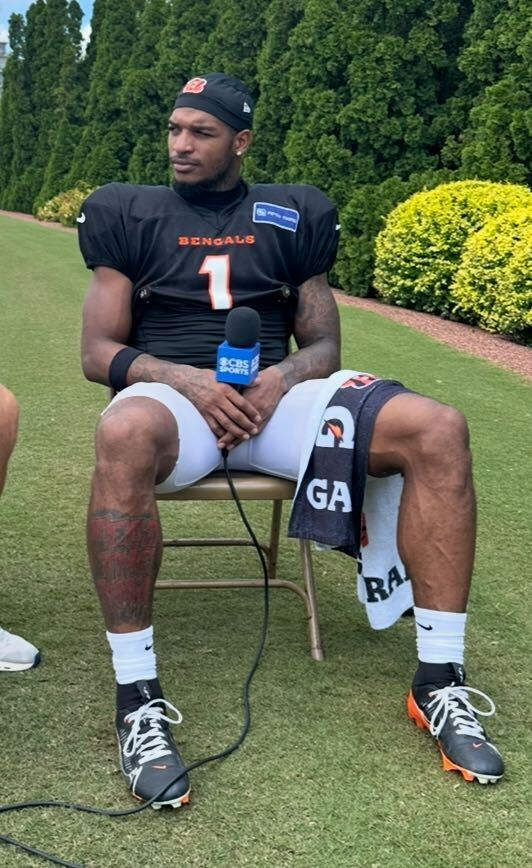
Ja'Marr Chase being interviewed by CBS Sports at Cincinnati Bengals training camp in August 2025

On March 18, 2025, Chase signed a four-year, $161 million contract extension with the Bengals, making him the highest paid non-quarterback in NFL history at the time.

In Week 2 against the Jaguars, Chase had 14 receptions for 165 yards and a touchdown in the 31–27 win. In Week 7 against the Steelers, Chase put up 16 receptions, 162 receiving yards, and one touchdown in a 33–31 win. His 16 receptions were a career-high and Bengals franchise record for receptions in a game. He earned AFC Offensive Player of the Week honors for his game against the Steelers.

In Week 11 against the Steelers, Chase ended up getting into an altercation with Steelers cornerback Jalen Ramsey that resulted in Ramsey getting ejected. Ramsey later accused Chase of spitting on him, which Chase denied. The incident was investigated by the NFL who decided to suspend Chase for one game. Chase attempted to appeal his suspension, but the NFL denied his appeal. Ramsey was later fined $14,491 for punching Chase. Chase later apologized after the incident. He finished the 2025 season with 125 receptions for 1,412 yards and eight touchdowns. He earned first team All-Pro honors for the 2025 season. He earned Pro Bowl honors for the fifth consecutive season.

=== 2026 ===
In Week 5 against the Dolphins, Chase scored a 45-yard one-handed touchdown catch while airborne.

During Sunday Night Football against the Pittsburgh Steelers in Week 10, Chase finished with 231 receiving yards on 11 receptions as the Bengals won 38–18.

== Career statistics ==
Legend
	Led the league
**Bold**	Career high

=== NFL ===
==== Regular season ====
Year	Team	Games		Receiving						Rushing					Fumbles	
Year	Team	GP	GS	Tgt	Rec	Yds	Avg	Lng	TD	Att	Yds	Avg	Lng	TD	Fum	Lost
2021	CIN	17	17	128	81	1,455	**18.0**	**82**	13	**7**	21	3.0	10	0	**2**	1
2022	CIN	12	12	134	87	1,046	12.0	60	9	5	8	1.6	6	0	**2**	**2**
2023	CIN	16	16	145	100	1,216	12.2	76	7	3	−6	−2.0	2	0	1	0
2024	CIN	17	16	175	**127**	**1,708**	13.4	70	**17**	3	**32**	**10.7**	**14**	0	0	0
2025	CIN	16	16	**185**	125	1,412	11.3	64	8	3	14	4.7	9	0	1	1
2026	CIN	9	9	87	64	878	13.7	53	7	0	0	0.0	0	0	1	0
Career		87	86	854	584	7,715	13.2	82	61	21	69	3.3	14	0	7	4

==== Postseason ====
Year	Team	Games		Receiving					Rushing					Fumbles	
Year	Team	GP	GS	Rec	Yds	Avg	Lng	TD	Att	Yds	Avg	Lng	TD	Fum	Lost
2021	CIN	4	4	**25**	**368**	**14.7**	**57**	1	**6**	**32**	**5.3**	**15**	0	0	0
2022	CIN	3	3	20	220	11.0	35	**2**	1	3	3.0	3	0	0	0
Career		7	7	45	588	13.1	57	3	7	35	5.0	15	0	0	0

=== College ===
Legend
Led the NCAA

Season	Team	GP	Receiving			
Season	Team	GP	Rec	Yds	Avg	TD
2018	LSU	13	23	313	13.6	3
2019	LSU	14	**84**	**1,780**	**21.2**	**20**
2020	LSU	0	Opted out due to COVID-19			
Career		27	107	2,093	19.6	23

== Career highlights ==
=== Awards and honors ===
NFL

- NFL Offensive Rookie of the Year (2021)
- 2× First-team All-Pro (2024, 2025)
- Second-team All-Pro (2021)
- 5× Pro Bowl (2021–2025)
- NFL receptions leader (2024)
- NFL receiving yards leader (2024)
- NFL receiving touchdowns leader (2024)
- Yards after catch leader: (2024)
- PFWA All-Rookie Team (2021)
- FedEx Ground Player of the Year (2024)
- Ranked No. 24 in the Top 100 Players of 2022
- Ranked No. 39 in the Top 100 Players of 2023
- Ranked No. 45 in the Top 100 Players of 2024
- Ranked No. 4 in the Top 100 Players of 2025
- Ranked No. 16 in the Top 100 Players of 2026

College

- CFP national champion (2019)
- Fred Biletnikoff Award (2019)
- Unanimous All-American (2019)
- NCAA receiving yards leader (2019)
- NCAA receiving touchdowns leader (2019)
- First-team All-SEC (2019)

=== Records ===
==== NFL records ====
- Receiving yards in a season including postseason by a rookie (1,823)
- Youngest NFL player with multiple 100 yard receiving games in a single postseason
- Receiving yards in a game by a rookie (266)
- Receiving yards in a postseason by a rookie (368)

==== Bengals franchise records ====
- Receiving yards in a game (266)
- Receiving yards in a rookie season (1,455)
- Receptions in a game (16)
- Receptions in a season (127) (2024)
- Receiving yards in a season (1,708) (2024)
- Receiving touchdowns in a season (17) (2024) (tied with Carl Pickens)
- Total touchdowns in a season (17) (2024) (tied with Carl Pickens)
