= 1933 Southeastern Conference football season =

- Sport: Football
- Duration: September 22 – December 9, 1933
- Number of teams: 13
- Champion: Alabama

SEC seasons
- 1934 →

1933 Southeastern Conference football standings
	Conf.					Overall
Team		W		L			W		L
Alabama $	5	–	0	–	1	7	–	1	–	1
LSU	3	–	0	–	2	7	–	0	–	3
Georgia	3	–	1	–	0	8	–	2	–	0
Tennessee	5	–	2	–	0	7	–	3	–	0
Tulane	4	–	2	–	1	6	–	3	–	1
Auburn	2	–	2	–	0	5	–	5	–	0
Ole Miss	2	–	2	–	1	6	–	3	–	2
Vanderbilt	2	–	2	–	2	4	–	3	–	3
Florida	2	–	3	–	0	5	–	3	–	1
Kentucky	2	–	3	–	0	5	–	5	–	0
Georgia Tech	2	–	5	–	0	5	–	5	–	0
Mississippi State	1	–	5	–	1	3	–	6	–	1
Sewanee	0	–	6	–	0	3	–	6	–	0
$ – Conference champion

The 1933 Southeastern Conference football season was the first season of college football played by the member schools of the Southeastern Conference (SEC) and was a part of the 1933 college football season. Alabama compiled a 7–1–1 record, with a conference record of 5–0–1, and was the inaugural SEC champion. LSU finished in second place with an undefeated overall record of 7–0–3, and a conference record of 3–0–2.

== Results and team statistics ==
Conf. rank	Team	Head coach	Overall record	Conf. record	PPG	PAG
1	Alabama	Frank Thomas	7–1–1 (.833)	5–0–1 (.917)	14.4	1.9
2	LSU	Biff Jones	7–0–3 (.850)	3–0–2 (.800)	17.6	2.7
3	Georgia	Harry Mehre	8–2–0 (.800)	3–1–0 (.750)	14.8	8.6
4	Tennessee	Robert Neyland	7–3–0 (.700)	5–2–0 (.714)	17.6	4.7
5	Tulane	Ted Cox	6–3–1 (.650)	4–2–1 (.643)	16.0	6.8
6	Auburn	Chet A. Wynne	5–5–0 (.500)	2–2–0 (.500)	13.3	10.4
7	Ole Miss	Ed Walker	6–3–2 (.636)	2–2–1 (.500)	15.2	7.2
8	Vanderbilt	Dan McGugin	4–3–3 (.550)	2–2–2 (.500)	12.6	10.7
9 (tie)	Florida	Dennis K. Stanley	5–3–1 (.611)	2–3–0 (.400)	12.7	5.9
9 (tie)	Kentucky	Harry Gamage	5–5–0 (.500)	2–3–0 (.400)	9.1	11.6
11	Georgia Tech	William Alexander	5–5–0 (.500)	2–5–0 (.286)	11.7	6.3
12	Mississippi State	Ross MacKechnie	3–6–1 (.350)	1–5–1 (.214)	6.9	14.9
13	Sewanee	Harry E. Clark	3–6–0 (.333)	0–6–0 (.000)	8.3	18.3

Key
PPG = Average of points scored per game
PAG = Average of points allowed per game

== Schedules ==
Index to colors and formatting
Non-conference matchup; SEC member won
Non-conference matchup; SEC member lost
Non-conference matchup; tie
SEC teams in **bold**

=== Week One ===
Date	Visiting team	Home team	Site	Result	Attendance	Reference
September 22	Birmingham–Southern	**Auburn**	Cramton Bowl • Montgomery, AL	**W** 20–7	10,000	
September 23	**Ole Miss**	Southwestern (TN)	Fargason Field • Memphis, TN	**T** 6–6	4,000	
September 23	Cumberland (TN)	**Vanderbilt**	Dudley Field • Nashville, TN	**W** 50–0	12,000	
September 23	Maryville (TN)	**Kentucky**	McLean Stadium • Lexington, KY	**W** 46–2		

=== Week Two ===
Date	Visiting team	Home team	Site	Result	Attendance	Reference
September 29	**Auburn**	Howard (AL)	Legion Field • Birmingham, AL	**W** 18–7		
September 30	Oglethorpe	**Alabama**	Denny Stadium • Tuscaloosa, AL	**W** 34–0	12,000	
September 30	Rice	**LSU**	Tiger Stadium • Baton Rouge, LA	**W** 13–0		
September 30	NC State	**Georgia**	Sanford Stadium • Athens, GA	**W** 20–10		
September 30	VPI	**Tennessee**	Shields–Watkins Field • Knoxville, TN	**W** 27–0	15,000	
September 30	Texas A&M	**Tulane**	Tulane Stadium • New Orleans, LA	**L** 6–13	20,000	
September 30	Mississippi State Teachers	**Ole Miss**	Hemingway Stadium • Oxford, MS	**W** 45–0		
September 30	**Vanderbilt**	Oklahoma	Oklahoma Memorial Stadium • Norman, OK	**T** 0–0	18,000	
September 30	Stetson	**Florida**	Florida Field • Gainesville, FL	**W** 28–0	6,000	
September 30	**Sewanee**	**Kentucky**	McLean Stadium • Lexington, KY	**KEN** 7–0	8,000	
September 30	Clemson	**Georgia Tech**	Grant Field • Atlanta, GA	**W** 39–2	12,000	
September 30	Millsaps	**Mississippi State**	Scott Field • Starkville, MS	**W** 12–0		

=== Week Three ===
Date	Visiting team	Home team	Site	Result	Attendance	Reference
October 7	**Ole Miss**	Alabama	Legion Field • Birmingham, AL	**T** 0–0	12,000	
October 7	Millsaps	LSU	Tiger Stadium • Baton Rouge, LA	**W** 40–0		
October 7	**Tulane**	Georgia	Sanford Stadium • Athens, GA	**UGA** 26–13	12,000	
October 7	**Mississippi State**	Tulane	Shields–Watkins Field • Knoxville, TN	**TEN** 20–0		
October 7	North Carolina	Vanderbilt	Dudley Field • Nashville, TN	**W** 20–13	6,000	
October 7	**Sewanee**	Florida	Fairfield Stadium • Jacksonville, FL	**FLA** 31–0	7,500	
October 7	**Georgia Tech**	Kentucky	McLean Stadium • Lexington, KY	**KEN** 7–6		

=== Week Four ===
Date	Visiting team	Home team	Site	Result	Attendance	Reference
October 14	**Mississippi State**	**Alabama**	Denny Stadium • Tuscaloosa, AL	**ALA** 18–0	5,000	
October 14	Centenary	**LSU**	Tiger Stadium • Baton Rouge, LA	**T** 0–0	18,000	
October 14	**Georgia**	North Carolina	Kenan Memorial Stadium • Chapel Hill, NC	**W** 30–0		
October 14	**Tennessee**	Duke	Duke Stadium • Durham, NC	**L** 2–10	22,000	
October 14	Maryland	**Tulane**	Tulane Stadium • New Orleans, LA	**W** 20–0	10,000	
October 14	**Auburn**	**Georgia Tech**	Grant Field • Atlanta, GA	**GT** 16–6		
October 14	**Vanderbilt**	Ohio State	Ohio Stadium • Columbus, OH	**L** 0–20	21,568	
October 14	**Florida**	NC State	Riddick Stadium • Raleigh, NC	**T** 0–0		
October 14	**Kentucky**	Cincinnati	Nippert Stadium • Cincinnati, OH	**W** 3–0		
October 14	**Sewanee**	Southwestern (TN)	Fargason Field • Memphis, TN	**W** 12–7		
October 14	**Ole Miss**	Marquette	Marquette Stadium • Milwaukee, WI	**W** 7–0	8,000	

=== Week Five ===
Date	Visiting team	Home team	Site	Result	Attendance	Reference
October 20	**Georgia**	Mercer	Centennial Stadium • Macon, GA	**W** 13–12	12,000	
October 21	**Alabama**	**Tennessee**	Shields–Watkins Field • Knoxville, TN	**ALA** 12–6	25,000	
October 21	Arkansas	**LSU**	State Fair Stadium • Shreveport, LA	**W** 20–0	15,000	
October 21	**Tulane**	**Georgia Tech**	Grant Field • Atlanta, GA	**TUL** 7–0		
October 21	**Auburn**	George Washington	Griffith Stadium • Washington, DC	**L** 6–19		
October 21	**Sewanee**	**Ole Miss**	Hemingway Stadium • Oxford, MS	**OM** 41–0		
October 21	**Mississippi State**	**Vanderbilt**	Dudley Field • Nashville, TN	**T** 7–7	7,000	
October 21	North Carolina	**Florida**	Florida Field • Gainesville, FL	**W** 9–0	9,000	
October 21	**Kentucky**	Washington & Lee	Maher Field • Roanoke, VA	**L** 0–7		

=== Week Six ===
Date	Visiting team	Home team	Site	Result	Attendance	Reference
October 27	Southwestern (TN)	**Mississippi State**	Scott Field • Starkville, MS	**L** 0–6		
October 28	**Alabama**	Fordham	Polo Grounds • New York, NY	**L** 0–2	60,000	
October 28	**Vanderbilt**	**LSU**	Tiger Stadium • Baton Rouge, LA	**T** 7–7	20,000	
October 28	NYU	**Georgia**	Sanford Stadium • Athens, GA	**W** 25–0	25,000	
October 28	**Florida**	**Tennessee**	Shields–Watkins Field • Knoxville, TN	**TEN** 13–6		
October 28	**Auburn**	**Tulane**	Tulane Stadium • New Orleans, LA	**AUB** 13–7	20,000	
October 28	Clemson	**Ole Miss**	Greer Field • Meridian, MS	**W** 13–0		
October 28	Duke	**Kentucky**	McLean Stadium • Lexington, KY	**L** 7–14	15,000	
October 28	**Georgia Tech**	North Carolina	Kenan Memorial Stadium • Chapel Hill, NC	**W** 10–6		
October 28	Cumberland (TN)	**Sewanee**	Hardee Field • Sewanee, TN	**W** 14–0		

=== Week Seven ===
Date	Visiting team	Home team	Site	Result	Attendance	Reference
November 3	Mississippi College	**Mississippi State**	Scott Field • Starkville, MS	**W** 18–0		
November 4	**Kentucky**	**Alabama**	Legion Field • Birmingham, AL	**ALA** 20–0	15,000	
November 4	South Carolina	**LSU**	Tiger Stadium • Baton Rouge, LA	**W** 30–7		
November 4	**Georgia**	**Florida**	Fairfield Stadium • Jacksonville, FL	**UGA** 14–0		
November 4	**Tennessee**	George Washington	Griffith Stadium • Washington, DC	**W** 13–0	25,000	
November 4	**Tulane**	Colgate	Yankee Stadium • Bronx, NY	**W** 7–0	20,000	
November 4	**Auburn**	Duke	Duke Stadium • Durham, NC	**L** 7–13		
November 4	Birmingham–Southern	**Ole Miss**	Hemingway Stadium • Oxford, MS	**W** 12–0		
November 4	**Vanderbilt**	**Georgia Tech**	Grant Field • Atlanta, GA	**VAN** 9–6		
November 4	Tennessee Tech	**Sewanee**	Hardee Field • Sewanee, TN	**W** 13–0		

=== Week Eight ===
Date	Visiting team	Home team	Site	Result	Attendance	Reference
November 11	VPI	**Alabama**	Denny Stadium • Tuscaloosa, AL	**W** 27–0	10,000	
November 11	**Georgia**	Yale	Yale Bowl • New Haven, CT	**W** 7–0	35,000	
November 11	**Ole Miss**	**Tennessee**	Shields–Watkins Field • Knoxville, TN	**TEN** 35–6	12,000	
November 11	**Mississippi State**	**Tulane**	Tulane Stadium • New Orleans, LA	**TUL** 33–0		
November 11	Oglethorpe	**Auburn**	Drake Field • Auburn, AL	**W** 27–6	6,000	
November 11	**Sewanee**	**Vanderbilt**	Dudley Field • Nashville, TN	**VAN** 27–14		
November 11	**Florida**	**Georgia Tech**	Grant Field • Atlanta, GA	**GT** 19–7	10,000	
November 11	VMI	**Kentucky**	McLean Stadium • Lexington, KY	**W** 21–6		

=== Week Nine ===
Date	Visiting team	Home team	Site	Result	Attendance	Reference
November 18	Alabama	Georgia Tech	Grant Field • Atlanta, GA	**ALA** 12–9	18,000	
November 18	Ole Miss	LSU	Tiger Stadium • Baton Rouge, LA	**LSU** 31–0	18,000	
November 18	Auburn	Georgia	Memorial Stadium • Columbus, GA	**AUB** 14–6		
November 18	Vanderbilt	Tennessee	Shields–Watkins Field • Knoxville, TN	**TEN** 33–6	20,000	
November 18	Kentucky	Tulane	Tulane Stadium • New Orleans, LA	**TUL** 34–0		
November 18	Sewanee	Mississippi State	Scott Field • Starkville, MS	**MSS** 26–13	3,000	

=== Week Ten ===
Date	Visiting team	Home team	Site	Result	Attendance	Reference
November 25	**Mississippi State**	**LSU**	Brown Field • Monroe, LA	**LSU** 21–6	6,000	
November 25	**Georgia**	**Georgia Tech**	Grant Field • Atlanta, GA	**UGA** 7–6	35,000	
November 25	**Sewanee**	**Tulane**	Tulane Stadium • New Orleans, LA	**TUL** 26–9	8,000	
November 25	**Auburn**	**Florida**	Florida Field • Gainesville, FL	**AUB** 14–7	12,000	
November 25	Centenary	**Ole Miss**	Municipal Stadium • Jackson, MS	**L** 6–7		

=== Week Eleven ===
Date	Visiting team	Home team	Site	Result	Attendance	Reference
November 30	**Alabama**	**Vanderbilt**	Dudley Field • Nashville, TN	**ALA** 7–0	15,000	
November 30	**Tennessee**	**Kentucky**	McLean Stadium • Lexington, TN	**TEN** 27–0		
December 2	**LSU**	**Tulane**	Tulane Stadium • New Orleans, LA	**T** 7–7	31,000	
December 2	**Georgia**	USC	Los Angeles Memorial Coliseum • Los Angeles, CA	**L** 0–31	45,000	
December 2	South Carolina	**Auburn**	Legion Field • Birmingham, AL	**L** 14–16	8,000	
December 2	**Mississippi State**	**Ole Miss**	Hemingway Stadium • Oxford, MS	**OM** 31–0		
December 2	Maryland	**Florida**	Plant Field • Tampa, FL	**W** 19–0	10,000	
December 2	Duke	**Georgia Tech**	Grant Field • Atlanta, GA	**W** 6–0	16,000	

=== Week Twelve ===
Date	Visiting team	Home team	Site	Result	Attendance	Reference
December 9	**Tennessee**	**LSU**	Tiger Stadium • Baton Rouge, LA	**LSU** 7–0	15,000	

== All-conference players ==
The following players were recognized as consensus first-team honors from the Associated Press (AP) and United Press (UP) on the 1933 All-SEC football team:

- David Ariail, End, Auburn (AP-1, UP-1)
- Graham Batchelor, End, Georgia (AP-1, UP-1)
- Jack Torrance, Tackle, LSU (AP-1, UP-1)
- Leroy Moorehead, Guard, Georgia (AP-1, UP-1)
- Thomas Hupke, Guard, Alabama (AP-1, UP-1)
- Talmadge Maples, Center, Tennessee (AP-1, UP-1)
- Ripper Williams, Quarterback, Auburn (AP-1, UP-1)
- Beattie Feathers, Halfback, Tennessee (AP-1, UP-1)

== All-Americans ==
One SEC player was a consensus first-team pick on the 1933 College Football All-America Team:

- Beattie Feathers, Halfback, Tennessee (AAB, CO, FWAAA, INS, LIB, NANA, NEA)

Other SEC players receiving All-American honors from at least one selector were:

- Thomas Hupke, Guard, Alabama (AP-2; CO-3; INS-3; NANA-3; NEA-2; UP-2; CP-1; WD-2)
- Tal Maples, Center, Tennessee (CP-3)
- Deke Brackett, Quarterback, Tennessee (CP-2)
- Dixie Howell, Halfback, Alabama (CP-3)
- Ralph Kercheval, Fullback, Kentucky (AP-3; CP-3)

== Head coaches ==
Records through the completion of the 1933 season

Team	Head coach	Years at school	Overall record	Record at school	SEC record
Alabama	Frank Thomas	3	50–13–3 (.780)	24–4–1 (.845)	5–0–1 (.917)
Auburn	Chet A. Wynne	4	61–41–9 (.590)	25–15–2 (.619)	2–2–0 (.500)
Florida	Dennis K. Stanley	1	5–3–1 (.611)	5–3–1 (.611)	2–3–0 (.400)
Georgia	Harry Mehre	6	35–20–3 (.629)	35–20–3 (.629)	3–1–0 (.750)
Georgia Tech	William Alexander	14	75–46–10 (.611)	75–46–10 (.611)	2–5–0 (.286)
Kentucky	Harry Gamage	7	32–25–5 (.556)	32–25–5 (.556)	2–3–0 (.400)
LSU	Biff Jones	2	43–11–6 (.767)	13–3–4 (.750)	3–0–2 (.800)
Mississippi State	Ross MacKechnie	1	3–6–1 (.350)	3–6–1 (.350)	1–5–1 (.214)
Ole Miss	Ed Walker	4	16–20–4 (.450)	16–20–4 (.450)	2–2–1 (.500)
Sewanee	Harry E. Clark	3	11–16–2 (.414)	11–16–2 (.414)	0–6–0 (.000)
Tennessee	Robert Neyland	8	68–7–5 (.881)	68–7–5 (.881)	5–2–0 (.714)
Tulane	Ted Cox	2	23–6–3 (.766)	12–5–2 (.684)	4–2–1 (.643)
Vanderbilt	Dan McGugin	29	191–52–19 (.765)	191–52–19 (.765)	2–2–2 (.500)
