= Charlie Marr =

American football player and coach (1910–1982)

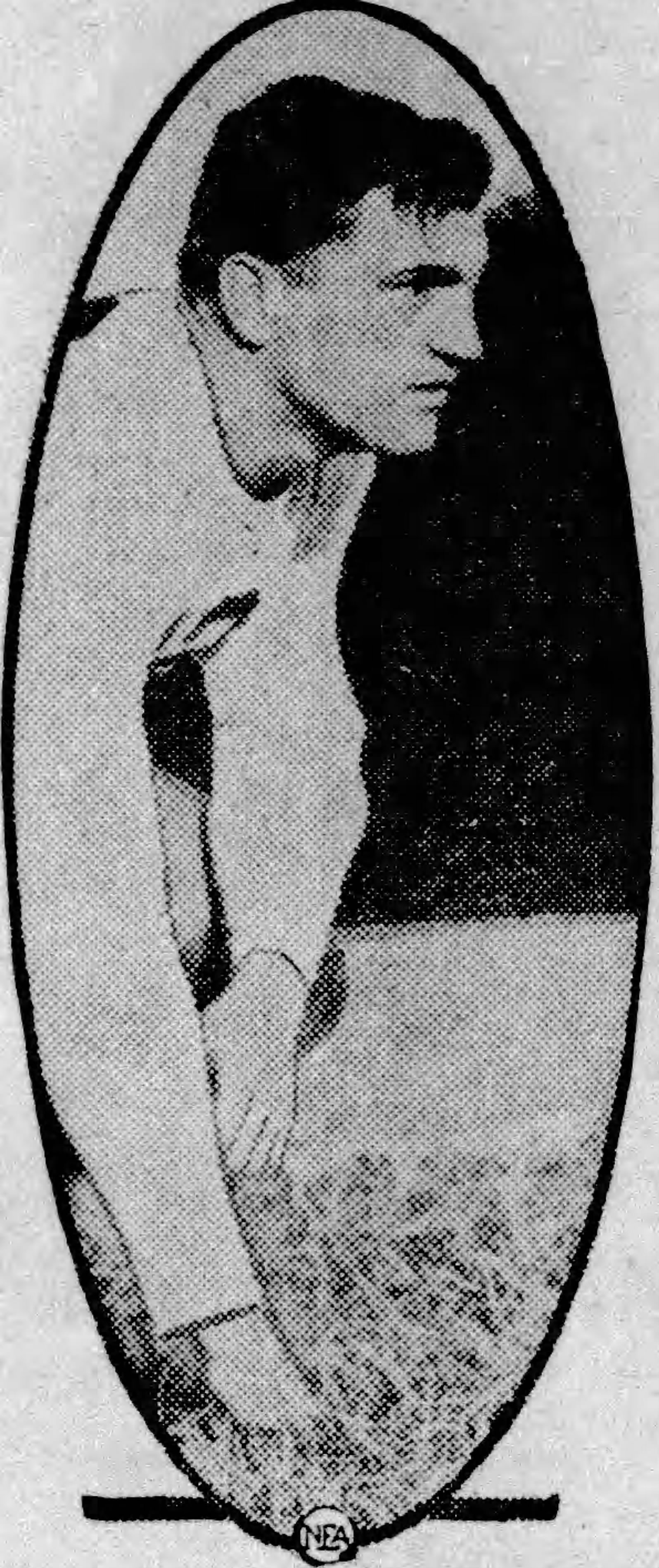
- Marr, c. 1933

Biographical details
- Born: July 13, 1910; Helena, Arkansas, U.S.
- Died: April 23, 1982 (aged 71); Dallas, Texas, U.S.

Playing career
- 1930: Arkansas A&M
- 1932–1934: Alabama
- Positions: Guard, tackle

Coaching career (HC unless noted)
- 1935: UNAM (line)
- 1936–1937: UNAM

Accomplishments and honors

Awards
- As a coach: 2× Liga Mayor champion (1936, 1937); As a player: National champion (1934); Third-team All-American (1934); First-team All-Southern (1934); First-team All-SEC (1934)

Charles B. Marr (July 13, 1910 – April 23, 1982) was an American college football player and coach. He was a third-team All-American on the 1934 Alabama Crimson Tide team that won the national championship. He was later a head coach of Pumas CU in Mexico.

== Early life ==
Charles B. Marr was born on July 13, 1910, (Note: As per gravestone.) in Helena, Arkansas.

Marr attended Pine Bluff High School in Pine Bluff, Arkansas, where he excelled in football. He was described by the Jonesboro Daily Tribune as "probably... the best High school tackle ever produced in Arkansas". Marr was a back-to-back first-team all-state honoree in 1928 and 1929. (Note: He is also described as a three-time all-state honoree.) He was also selected to an Arkansas all-star team that faced off against a Louisiana all-star team in Haynesville, Louisiana, in December 1928, serving as team captain and blocking a punt in a 15–7 loss.

== College career ==
Marr enrolled at Arkansas A&M (now known as the University of Arkansas at Monticello) in 1930, already weighing over 200 lb (91 kg). That season, he was the starting right tackle for the Boll Weevils in their scoreless Armistice Day tie against Arkansas State, and was one of 20 players awarded a sweater at the annual team banquet. Marr was one of several Arkansas natives – alongside Bear Bryant and Don Hutson – who were recruited to the University of Alabama by Jimmy Harland, a "self-appointed scout" who ran a poolroom in Pine Bluff which was popular with the local youth. However, he dislocated several vertebrae in his neck after diving into a shallow swimming pool, forcing him to miss the 1931 season. Marr then suffered a fractured skull in early 1932 after he was hit by a grounder while playing baseball. He played both on the Crimson Tide varsity squad and the "B" team as a sophomore in 1932, and then worked as a lumberjack at a camp in Arkansas the following summer.

"Marr is not only powerful and husky, but he is one of the fastest linemen at the Capstone in getting down field. He also has an offensive charge flavored with dynamite." –Zipp Newman of The Birmingham News, 1933

Marr entered the 1933 season as a reserve tackle for the Crimson Tide. However, he and fellow reserve tackle Jim Whatley "were not more than a shade less brilliant" than starters Jim Dildy and Bill Lee in their season-opening win over Oglethorpe, according to The Montgomery Advertiser. The following week, Marr recovered a fumble in a scoreless tie against Ole Miss. He started at tackle in their next game against Mississippi State, blocking a punt in an 18–0 win. Marr was shifted to the guard position in late October. Despite being hailed as "the most powerful man" on the squad, he was also noted for his speed. He was a starter at guard in Alabama's homecoming game against VPI in November; he suffered a broken nose and was knocked unconscious after a head-on collision with teammate Bear Bryant in a 27–0 win, after which he was moved back to the tackle position. The Crimson Tide finished the season with a 7–1–1 record, capturing the inaugural Southeastern Conference (SEC) championship. Marr was awarded a varsity letter, and was initiated into the Alabama "A" Club soon afterwards. He was elected as club president a few months later.

"[...] Charlie Marr, the 204-pound guard, a marvelous physical specimen, who in spite of his weight, is said to be as fast and agile as any forward in the south. And the tremendous strength he is able to exert after all this fast moving about has wrought devastation upon opposing teams." –Ed Miles of The Atlanta Journal, 1934

=== 1934 ===
With the graduation of starting guards Thomas Hupke and B'Ho Kirkland, Marr was moved back to guard for his senior season in 1934. Despite being hampered by injuries, he turned in strong performances at guard in Alabama's spring practice. Shortly before the start of the season, Marr was measured as the heaviest player on the roster at 214 lb (97 kg), with The Birmingham Age-Herald reporting that "moving him on the defense is like trying to move Red Mountain." He earned the starting nod at guard ahead of Alabama's season-opening win over Howard College–now known as Samford. After helping his team to a 13–6 win over Tennessee, The Birmingham News called Marr "the answer to [head coach Frank] Thomas' prayer for a great guard" to replace those lost to graduation. The next week, he was described by the same paper as "death to Georgia ball carriers" in a win over the Bulldogs, while The Atlanta Georgian lauded his blocking on offense. In November, Marr helped Alabama to a 40–0 blowout victory over Clemson on homecoming, followed by a 40–0 win over Georgia Tech. His performance in the regular season finale versus Vanderbilt was particularly praised in the local press, with The Birmingham Post reporting that he and fellow guard Bob Ed Morrow "were practically unmoveable" in the 34–0 Thanksgiving Day win.

Charlie Marr started out New Year's Day as one of the great guards of football. Thank him for Alabama hanging in there in the first and second period.

— The Birmingham News on Marr's Rose Bowl performance

From a defensive standpoint the greatest player on the field was Charlie Marr, the Tide's big guard. He played like a wild man. He was as destructive as a prairie fire.

— The Atlanta Journal discussing the same game

In the 1935 Rose Bowl, Marr started at left guard in a 29–13 win over Stanford in front of 85,000 spectators. (Note: Some sources credit Marr with an interception in either the second or third quarter. However, most sources attribute it to teammate Riley Smith.) He was one of four Pine Bluff natives on the Crimson Tide who played in the game, and The Birmingham Age-Herald claimed that he "went out there and closed his college career with one of the most nearly perfect performances of guard play Rose Bowl has ever seen!" Marr was presented with the game ball by his teammates for his efforts. Alabama completed its perfect season with a 10–0 record and was recognized as the national champion by multiple selectors (as was Minnesota). Marr earned first-team All-SEC honors from the Associated Press (AP), the United Press (UP), and the All-Southeastern Board of Football. He was also a first-team All-Southern selection by the UP, and a third-team All-American by Liberty magazine.

Marr received a bachelor's degree from the University of Alabama School of Education in May 1935. He was then chosen to play in the 1935 Chicago Charities College All-Star Game against the Chicago Bears, though he did not participate.

Marr was one of 22 players from the 1935 team who gathered in 1981 for teammate Bob Ed Morrow's birthday, bringing along the Rose Bowl game ball. In 1992, he was named to the Alabama all-time team as a member of the second-team offense by Birmingham Post-Herald sports editor Bill Lumpkin.

== Professional career ==
Within a few weeks of the 1935 Rose Bowl, Marr reportedly received multiple offers to play professional football, including from the New York Giants. "I've got a chance to play pro football with Detroit, Pittsburgh and New York," he said shortly thereafter, "but I've had enough football for a while. I've got a couple of chances to coach and it looks like I'll take one of them before long." Marr signed a three-year contract with the Brooklyn Dodgers of the National Football League in February.

== Coaching career ==
I have never lived in a place where the people were so friendly and congenial. The Mexican civilization and way of living enchanted me.

— Marr after his first season coaching in Mexico

However, Marr instead accepted a job as the line coach at the National Autonomous University of Mexico (UNAM), where his college teammate Dixie Howell had been hired as the head football coach for the Osos. His salary was underwritten by American oil magnate Harry Ford Sinclair. UNAM was the only school to employ American coaches, and had played the sport since 1927. Howell said Marr was a "cracker-jack linesman and a great guy." Marr also spoke fluent Spanish, as opposed to Howell, having minored in Spanish at the University of Alabama. The pair helped the auriazules (gold and blues) win the 1935 national championship. After the title win, Marr sent a telegram to Dorrance D. Roderick, publisher of the El Paso Times, to inquire about a berth for UNAM in the Sun Bowl in El Paso, Texas, calling it a "natural" fit due to the city's large Mexican-American population. Howell left the team after the season.

Marr considered several offers in 1936, both as a player and a coach, and coached the University of Alabama linemen during offseason spring practices. In anticipation of a new contract with UNAM, he said: "I like Mexico City and hope to return." Marr was officially offered the position of head football coach in late March, with his appointment being ratified by the school rector, Luis Chico Goerne, the following month. According to a leading Mexican sportswriter, Marr "ha[d] demonstrated that he can be a good coach without forgetting to be a gentleman." Team captain Gonzalo Flores doubled as his assistant coach and lead interpreter. On October 10, 1936, UNAM hosted Occidental in a game in Mexico City, losing by a score of 19–6. The following week, the team inaugurated the Clásico Poli-Universidad rivalry game against the Instituto Politécnico Nacional (IPN), suffering a 6–0 defeat. UNAM requested a rematch in December, which they won 14–6. Marr guided the Osos to the 1936 national championship.

The greatest obstacle to football in Mexico is that the students study too much."

— Marr in 1937

In 1937, Marr returned to UNAM for his second season as head coach, reportedly receiving a salary increase from the British American Oil Company. His assistant coach was Eduardo "Eddie" Meza. The team opened the season with a 12–6 tune-up win over the UNAM alumni in Mexico City. Marr picked a 24-player squad to travel 1,500 mi (2,400 km) via train to face Louisiana College – the sixth ever meeting between the two schools. After conducting a light workout during a stop in San Antonio, Texas, The San Antonio Light remarked that the team "ran, punted and passed the ball like experts, and had it not been for their strange tongue, could have passed for any American college team." UNAM lost by a score of 18–0, with Governor Richard W. Leche, Lt. Governor Earl Long, Senator John H. Overton, and three U.S. House reps among those in attendance. The following week, they suffered a 27–13 loss to Lamar in Beaumont, Texas, though they "displayed an aptitude for the game that had the crowd cheering." UNAM later hosted Texas A&I in Mexico City on Revolution Day. Despite taking a halftime lead, the Osos lost 26–12. Nevertheless, UNAM went unbeaten against Mexican opponents, including an 83–0 win over Deportivo Suizo and a 38–7 rivalry win over IPN, capturing the 1937 national championship title.

In addition to his coaching duties at UNAM, Marr worked a part-time job in the local oil industry. However, he was dismissed from both posts in 1938 as a consequence of the Mexican oil expropriation. Marr was a candidate for line coach at Rice Institute (now known as Rice University) in 1940. However, just a few months later, he was reportedly working in the oil industry in Texas.

Marr was succeeded as the UNAM head coach in 1938 by one of his former players, Gonzalo Flores. Another former player, Roberto "Tapatío" Méndez, went on to become a longtime coach of the team.

== Personal life ==
During his time at Alabama, Marr developed a close friendship with teammate Bear Bryant.

On December 18, 1937, Marr married Elizabeth Rogers at the First Methodist Church in Dallas, Texas. The ceremony was performed by pastor William Clyde Martin. After losing his job in Mexico, Marr moved to San Antonio, Texas, and sold building supplies. During World War II, he rose through the ranks from lieutenant to colonel in the United States Army Air Corps, serving in both Texas and India. Within his first year, Marr was named the athletic and recreation director for Flying Cadets at Randolph Field. He later served as director of the Gulf Coast Training Center physical training program. Marr moved to Dallas in the early 1950s and opened a real estate business, working as an appraiser for about 30 years. He was a member of the Highland Park Methodist Church and the Hella Temple Shrine, as well as the Bonehead Club, an organization of Dallas businessmen.

Marr died of a heart attack at his home in North Dallas on April 23, 1982, at the age of 71. He was buried at the Sulphur Springs Cemetery in Sulphur Springs, Texas.
