= Joe Rupert =

American athlete and coach (1912–1996)

Biographical details
- Born: June 24, 1912; Van Lear, Kentucky, U.S.
- Died: February 5, 1996 (aged 83); Venice, Florida, U.S.

Playing career

Football
- 1932–1934: Kentucky

Basketball
- 1932–1933: Kentucky
- Positions: End (football); Center (basketball)

Coaching career (HC unless noted)

Football
- 1939: Kentucky (assistant)

Basketball
- 1939–1940: Kentucky (assistant)

Track and field
- 1938–1941: Kentucky

Accomplishments and honors

Awards
- All-Southern (1932); 2× Second-team All-SEC (1933, 1934)

Joseph Frank Rupert (June 24, 1912 – February 5, 1996) was an American college football, basketball, and track and field athlete and coach at the University of Kentucky. He was a Navy veteran of World War II, and after his sporting career was a chairman of the board of the Rupert-Hager-Cromwell-Agency in Ashland.

== University of Kentucky ==
=== Playing career ===
Prior to his career at the University of Kentucky, Rupert attended high school in Catlettsburg. He stood 6 feet 1 inches and weighed 180 pounds.

==== Football ====
Rupert was a prominent end on the football team, selected All-Southern in 1932 by the coaches of the Alabama Crimson Tide.

=== Coaching career ===
Rupert was head track coach and the assistant football and basketball coach for his from 1938 to 1941.
