= 1933 LSU Tigers football team =

American college football season

1933 LSU Tigers football
- Conference: Southeastern Conference
- Record: 7–0–3 (3–0–2 SEC)
- Head coach: Biff Jones (2nd season)
- Offensive scheme: Single-wing
- Home stadium: Tiger Stadium

1933 Southeastern Conference football standings
	Conf.					Overall
Team		W		L			W		L
Alabama $	5	–	0	–	1	7	–	1	–	1
LSU	3	–	0	–	2	7	–	0	–	3
Georgia	3	–	1	–	0	8	–	2	–	0
Tennessee	5	–	2	–	0	7	–	3	–	0
Tulane	4	–	2	–	1	6	–	3	–	1
Auburn	2	–	2	–	0	5	–	5	–	0
Ole Miss	2	–	2	–	1	6	–	3	–	2
Vanderbilt	2	–	2	–	2	4	–	3	–	3
Florida	2	–	3	–	0	5	–	3	–	1
Kentucky	2	–	3	–	0	5	–	5	–	0
Georgia Tech	2	–	5	–	0	5	–	5	–	0
Mississippi State	1	–	5	–	1	3	–	6	–	1
Sewanee	0	–	6	–	0	3	–	6	–	0
$ – Conference champion

The 1933 LSU Tigers football team was an American football team that represented Louisiana State University (LSU) as a member of the Southeastern Conference (SEC) during the 1933 college football season. In their second year under head coach Biff Jones, the Tigers compiled an overall record of 7–0–3, with a conference record of 3–0–2, and finished second in the SEC. Halfback Abe Mickal led the team in scoring.

== Schedule ==
Date	Opponent	Site	Result	Attendance	Source
September 30	Rice*	Tiger Stadium; Baton Rouge, LA	W 13–0		
October 7	Millsaps*	Tiger Stadium; Baton Rouge, LA	W 40–0		
October 14	Centenary*	Tiger Stadium; Baton Rouge, LA	T 0–0	18,000	
October 21	vs. Arkansas*	State Fair Stadium; Shreveport, LA (rivalry)	W 20–0	15,000	
October 28	Vanderbilt^{†}	Tiger Stadium; Baton Rouge, LA	T 7–7	20,000	
November 4	South Carolina*	Tiger Stadium; Baton Rouge, LA	W 30–7		
November 18	Ole Miss	Tiger Stadium; Baton Rouge, LA (rivalry)	W 31–0		
November 25	vs. Mississippi State	Brown Field; Monroe, LA (rivalry)	W 21–6	6,000	
December 2	at Tulane	Tulane Stadium; New Orleans, LA (Battle for the Rag)	T 7–7	31,000	
December 9	Tennessee	Tiger Stadium; Baton Rouge, LA	W 7–0	15,000	
*Non-conference game; ^{†}Homecoming

== Award winners ==
All-SEC

Players selected by the Associated Press (AP) or United Press (UP) for the 1933 All-SEC football team:

- Jack Torrance, tackle (first-team AP, UP)
- Abe Mickal, halfback (second-team UP)
