= 1933 Alabama Crimson Tide football team =

American college football season

1933 Alabama Crimson Tide football
- Conference: Southeastern Conference
- Record: 7–1–1 (5–0–1 SEC)
- Head coach: Frank Thomas (3rd season)
- Captain: Foy Leach
- Home stadium: Denny Stadium; Legion Field

1933 Southeastern Conference football standings
	Conf.					Overall
Team		W		L			W		L
Alabama $	5	–	0	–	1	7	–	1	–	1
LSU	3	–	0	–	2	7	–	0	–	3
Georgia	3	–	1	–	0	8	–	2	–	0
Tennessee	5	–	2	–	0	7	–	3	–	0
Tulane	4	–	2	–	1	6	–	3	–	1
Auburn	2	–	2	–	0	5	–	5	–	0
Ole Miss	2	–	2	–	1	6	–	3	–	2
Vanderbilt	2	–	2	–	2	4	–	3	–	3
Florida	2	–	3	–	0	5	–	3	–	1
Kentucky	2	–	3	–	0	5	–	5	–	0
Georgia Tech	2	–	5	–	0	5	–	5	–	0
Mississippi State	1	–	5	–	1	3	–	6	–	1
Sewanee	0	–	6	–	0	3	–	6	–	0
$ – Conference champion

The 1933 Alabama Crimson Tide football team (variously "Alabama", "UA" or "Bama") represented the University of Alabama in the 1933 college football season. It was the Crimson Tide's 40th overall and 1st season as a member of the Southeastern Conference (SEC). The team was led by head coach Frank Thomas, in his third year, and played their home games at Denny Stadium in Tuscaloosa and Legion Field in Birmingham, Alabama. They finished the season with a record of seven wins, one loss and one tie (7–1–1 overall, 5–0–1 in the SEC), and as the first SEC champions.

After opening the season with victory over Oglethorpe, Alabama played Ole Miss to a scoreless tie in their first SEC matchup. One week later, the Crimson Tide defeated Mississippi State for their first SEC victory and followed that with their first SEC road victory with their win over Tennessee at Shields–Watkins Field. From Knoxville, Alabama traveled to New York City where they lost their only game of the season against Fordham in an intersectional matchup. Alabama rebounded with four consecutive victories to close the season as conference champions with wins over Kentucky, VPI (Virginia Tech) on homecoming, Georgia Tech and Vanderbilt.

== Schedule ==
Date	Opponent	Site	Result	Attendance	Source
September 30	Oglethorpe*	Denny Stadium; Tuscaloosa, AL	W 34–0	12,000	
October 7	Ole Miss	Legion Field; Birmingham, AL (rivalry)	T 0–0	12,000	
October 14	Mississippi State	Denny Stadium; Tuscaloosa, AL (rivalry)	W 18–0	5,000	
October 21	at Tennessee	Shields–Watkins Field; Knoxville, TN (rivalry)	W 12–6	25,000	
October 28	at Fordham*	Polo Grounds; New York, NY	L 0–2	60,000	
November 4	Kentucky	Legion Field; Birmingham, AL	W 20–0	15,000	
November 11	VPI*^{†}	Denny Stadium; Tuscaloosa, AL	W 27–0	10,000	
November 18	at Georgia Tech	Grant Field; Atlanta, GA (rivalry)	W 12–9	18,000	
November 30	at Vanderbilt	Dudley Field; Nashville, TN	W 7–0	15,000	
*Non-conference game; ^{†}Homecoming

== Before the season ==
In December 1932, after the conclusion of the 1932 season, Alabama withdrew from the Southern Conference to become a charter member of the SEC. The Crimson Tide was joined by Auburn, Florida, Georgia, Georgia Tech, Kentucky, LSU, Mississippi, Mississippi State, Sewanee, Tennessee, Tulane and Vanderbilt. Effective the start of the 1933 season, the SEC was formed in an effort to create a smaller, geographically closer conference.

== Game summaries ==
=== Oglethorpe ===
Team	1	2	3	4	Total
Oglethorpe	0	0	0	0	0
• Alabama	14	7	7	6	34

- Date: September 30
- Location: Denny Stadium
  Tuscaloosa, Alabama
- Game attendance: 12,000

Although they played most of the game in a heavy rainstorm, Alabama opened the 1933 season with a 34–0 victory over Oglethorpe at Denny Stadium. The Crimson Tide took a 14–0 first quarter lead on a 12-yard Frank Moseley touchdown pass to Dixie Howell and a two-yard James McDanal touchdown run. With the lead, Alabama pulled their starters and played their second string for the second quarter. In the second, they took a 21–0 lead on a 21-yard Howard Chappell touchdown run. In the second half, the Crimson Tide closed the game with a touchdown in each of the final two quarters. McDanal scored first on a short run followed by a 12-yard Chappell run for the 34–0 win.

=== Ole Miss ===
Team	1	2	3	4	Total
Ole Miss	0	0	0	0	0
Alabama	0	0	0	0	0

- Date: October 7
- Location: Legion Field
  Birmingham, Alabama
- Game attendance: 12,000

In what was the first SEC game ever played by the Crimson Tide, Alabama and the rival Ole Miss Rebels battled to a 0–0 tie at Legion Field. Although Alabama outgained the Rebels in total offense 179 to 33 yards, seven fumbles kept the Crimson Tide out of the end zone.

=== Mississippi State ===
Team	1	2	3	4	Total
Mississippi State	0	0	0	0	0
• Alabama	0	6	6	6	18

- Date: October 14
- Location: Denny Stadium
  Tuscaloosa, Alabama
- Game attendance: 5,000

Against their long-time rival, the Mississippi State Maroons, Alabama won their first all-time SEC game 18–0 at Denny Stadium. In the game, Frank Moseley scored on a pair of touchdown runs with Dixie Howell scoring the other in the third quarter on a seven-yard run in the victory.

=== Tennessee ===
Third Saturday in October

Team	1	2	3	4	Total
• Alabama	0	0	6	6	12
Tennessee	0	6	0	0	6

- Date: October 21
- Location: Shields–Watkins Field
  Knoxville, Tennessee
- Game attendance: 25,000

Against rival Tennessee, Alabama defeated the Volunteers, 12–6 at Shields–Watkins Field. After a scoreless first quarter, the Volunteers took a 6–0 lead in the second when Beattie Feathers scored on a touchdown run. Down six at the half, a pair of second half touchdowns gave the Crimson Tide the 12–6 victory. Erskine Walker scored in the third on a 34-yard run and Dixie Howell scored the game-winning touchdown in the fourth on a four-yard run. The loss was the first at home for Tennessee in the Robert Neyland era. The victory improved Alabama's all-time record against Tennessee 10–5–1.

=== Fordham ===
Team	1	2	3	4	Total
Alabama	0	0	0	0	0
• Fordham	2	0	0	0	2

- Date: October 28
- Location: Polo Grounds
  New York
- Game attendance: 60,000

Before 60,000 fans at the Polo Grounds in New York City, Alabama was defeated the Fordham Rams, 2–0. The only points scored in the game came in the first quarter when Amerino Sarno blocked a Dixie Howell punt that Howell recovered in the endzone for a Fordham safety. The loss was Alabama's first intersectional loss since their 15–0 defeat against Wisconsin in 1928, and brought Alabama's all-time record against Fordham 0–1.

=== Kentucky ===
Team	1	2	3	4	Total
Kentucky	0	0	0	0	0
• Alabama	0	6	7	7	20

- Date: November 4
- Location: Legion Field
  Birmingham, Alabama
- Game attendance: 15,000

A week after their first loss of the season, Alabama defeated the Kentucky Wildcats 20–0 at Legion Field. After a scoreless first quarter, the Crimson Tide took a 6–0 in the second after Dixie Howell scored on a 55-yard touchdown run. Alabama then closed the game with a five-yard Howell touchdown run in the third and a short Joe Demyanovich touchdown run in the fourth for the 20–0 win. In the first quarter, Howell punted the football 89-yards, which still stands as the Alabama record for longest punt.

=== VPI ===
Team	1	2	3	4	Total
VPI	0	0	0	0	0
• Alabama	6	12	9	0	27

- Date: November 11
- Location: Denny Stadium
  Tuscaloosa, Alabama
- Game attendance: 10,000

Against the Fighting Gobblers of VPI (now known as the Virginia Tech Hokies), Alabama won 27–0 on homecoming at Denny Field. The Crimson Tide took a 6–0 first quarter lead after Riley Smith scored on a five-yard touchdown run. They extended their lead to 18–0 at halftime on touchdown runs of one-yard by Joe Demyanovich and ten-yards by James Angelich in the second quarter. Alabama then closed the game with a 16-yard Dixie Howell touchdown run and a tackle of the Gobblers' Ray Mills for a safety in the third for the 27–0 win.

=== Georgia Tech ===
Team	1	2	3	4	Total
• Alabama	6	0	0	6	12
Georgia Tech	0	2	7	0	9

- Date: November 18
- Location: Grant Field
  Atlanta
- Game attendance: 18,000

Against the Georgia Tech Golden Tornado, Alabama won 12–9 at Grant Field. The Crimson Tide took a 6–0 lead in the first quarter on a Dixie Howell touchdown run. After a Howell fumble resulted in a safety in the second, Tech took a 9–6 lead in the third quarter when W. A. Davis scored on a one-yard touchdown run. Howell then scored the game-winning touchdown in the fourth quarter on a short run.

=== Vanderbilt ===
Team	1	2	3	4	Total
• Alabama	0	7	0	0	7
Vanderbilt	0	0	0	0	0

- Date: November 30
- Location: Dudley Field
  Nashville, Tennessee
- Game attendance: 15,000

In the season finale at Vanderbilt, Alabama defeated the Commodores 7–0 to capture the first SEC championship. The only points of the game came on a short Dixie Howell touchdown run in the second quarter.

== Personnel ==
=== Varsity letter winners ===
Player	Hometown	Position
James Angelich	Indiana Harbor, Indiana	Halfback
Troy Barker	Lineville, Alabama	Guard
Bear Bryant	Moro Bottom, Arkansas	End
Jeff Bush	Tuscaloosa, Alabama	Back
Howard Chappell	Sylacauga, Alabama	Back
Joe Demyanovich	Bayonne, New Jersey	Fullback
Jim Dildy	Nashville, Arkansas	Tackle
Joe Dildy	Nashville, Arkansas	Center
Kavanaugh Francis	Timson, Texas	Center
Calvin Frey	Arkadelphia, Arkansas	Tackle
Ralph Gandy	Birmingham, Alabama	End
Dixie Howell	Hartford, Alabama	Halfback
Larry Hughes	Tuscaloosa, Alabama	Back
John Hundertmark	Washington, Pennsylvania	Tackle
Thomas Hupke	East Chicago, Indiana	Guard
Don Hutson	Pine Bluff, Arkansas	End
B'Ho Kirkland	Columbia, Alabama	Guard
Foy Leach	Siloam Springs, Arkansas	End
Bill Lee	Eutaw, Alabama	Tackle
Charlie Marr	Pine Bluff, Arkansas	Guard
Thomas McMillian	Brewton, Alabama	End
Frank Moseley	Montgomery, Alabama	Back
Riley Smith	Columbus, Mississippi	Quarterback
Erskine Walker	Birmingham, Alabama	Halfback
Jim Whatley	Alexander City, Alabama	Tackle

=== Coaching staff ===
Name	Position	Seasons at Alabama	Alma mater
Frank Thomas	Head coach	3	Notre Dame (1923)
Paul Burnum	Assistant coach	4	Alabama (1922)
Hank Crisp	Assistant coach	13	VPI (1920)
Harold Drew	Assistant coach	3	Bates (1916)
Jennings B. Whitworth	Assistant coach	2	Alabama (1931)
