= 1933 Georgia Tech Yellow Jackets football team =

American college football season

1933 Georgia Tech Yellow Jackets football
- Conference: Southeastern Conference
- Record: 5–5 (2–5 SEC)
- Head coach: William Alexander (14th season)
- Offensive scheme: Double wing
- Captains: E. E. Laws; Bob Tharpe
- Home stadium: Grant Field

1933 Southeastern Conference football standings
	Conf.					Overall
Team		W		L			W		L
Alabama $	5	–	0	–	1	7	–	1	–	1
LSU	3	–	0	–	2	7	–	0	–	3
Georgia	3	–	1	–	0	8	–	2	–	0
Tennessee	5	–	2	–	0	7	–	3	–	0
Tulane	4	–	2	–	1	6	–	3	–	1
Auburn	2	–	2	–	0	5	–	5	–	0
Ole Miss	2	–	2	–	1	6	–	3	–	2
Vanderbilt	2	–	2	–	2	4	–	3	–	3
Florida	2	–	3	–	0	5	–	3	–	1
Kentucky	2	–	3	–	0	5	–	5	–	0
Georgia Tech	2	–	5	–	0	5	–	5	–	0
Mississippi State	1	–	5	–	1	3	–	6	–	1
Sewanee	0	–	6	–	0	3	–	6	–	0
$ – Conference champion

The 1933 Georgia Tech Yellow Jackets football team was an American football team that represented Georgia Tech as a member of the Southeastern Conference (SEC) during the 1933 college football season. In their 14th year under head coach William Alexander, the Yellow Jackets compiled an overall record of 5–5, with a conference record of 2–5, and finished 11th in the SEC.

This was also the first season in which Georgia Tech played longtime rival Duke, the teams would go on to meet on the football field every year uninterrupted until 2023.

== Schedule ==
Date	Opponent	Site	Result	Attendance	Source
September 30	Clemson*	Grant Field; Atlanta, GA (rivalry)	W 39–2	12,000	
October 7	at Kentucky	McLean Stadium; Lexington, KY	L 6–7		
October 14	Auburn	Grant Field; Atlanta, GA (rivalry)	W 16–6		
October 21	Tulane	Grant Field; Atlanta, GA	L 0–7		
October 28	at North Carolina*	Kenan Memorial Stadium; Chapel Hill, NC	W 10–6		
November 4	Vanderbilt	Grant Field; Atlanta, GA (rivalry)	L 6–9		
November 11	Florida	Grant Field; Atlanta, GA	W 19–7		
November 18	Alabama	Grant Field; Atlanta, GA (rivalry)	L 9–12	18,000	
November 25	Georgia	Grant Field; Atlanta, GA (rivalry)	L 6–7	35,000	
December 2	Duke*	Grant Field; Atlanta, GA	W 6–0	16,000	
*Non-conference game
