= Talmadge Maples =

American football player (1910–1975)

Profile
- Position: Center

Personal information
- Born: December 1, 1910; Knoxville, Tennessee, U.S.
- Died: April 19, 1975 (aged 64); Palm Beach, Florida, U.S.
- Listed height: 6 ft 0 in (1.83 m)
- Listed weight: 195 lb (88 kg)

Career information
- College: Tennessee

Career history
- Cincinnati Reds (1934)

Awards and highlights
- First-team All-SEC (1933)

Talmadge Robert "Tal" "Sheriff" Maples (December 1, 1910 – April 19, 1975) was an American football player. Maples was a prominent center for the Tennessee Volunteers, captain of the 1933 team. He played one season in the NFL with the Cincinnati Reds in 1934.
