= 1933 Tulane Green Wave football team =

American college football season

1933 Tulane Green Wave football
- Conference: Southeastern Conference
- Record: 6–3–1 (4–2–1 SEC)
- Head coach: Ted Cox (2nd season)
- Captain: Floyd Roberts
- Home stadium: Tulane Stadium

1933 Southeastern Conference football standings
	Conf.					Overall
Team		W		L			W		L
Alabama $	5	–	0	–	1	7	–	1	–	1
LSU	3	–	0	–	2	7	–	0	–	3
Georgia	3	–	1	–	0	8	–	2	–	0
Tennessee	5	–	2	–	0	7	–	3	–	0
Tulane	4	–	2	–	1	6	–	3	–	1
Auburn	2	–	2	–	0	5	–	5	–	0
Ole Miss	2	–	2	–	1	6	–	3	–	2
Vanderbilt	2	–	2	–	2	4	–	3	–	3
Florida	2	–	3	–	0	5	–	3	–	1
Kentucky	2	–	3	–	0	5	–	5	–	0
Georgia Tech	2	–	5	–	0	5	–	5	–	0
Mississippi State	1	–	5	–	1	3	–	6	–	1
Sewanee	0	–	6	–	0	3	–	6	–	0
$ – Conference champion

The 1933 Tulane Green Wave football team was an American football team that represented Tulane University as a member of the Southeastern Conference (SEC) during the 1933 college football season. In its second year under head coach Ted Cox, Tulane compiled a 6–3–1 record (4–2–1 in conference games), finished fifth in the SEC, and outscored opponents by a total of 160 to 68.

The Green Wave played its home games at Tulane Stadium in New Orleans.

== Schedule ==
Date	Opponent	Site	Result	Attendance	Source
September 30	Texas A&M*	Tulane Stadium; New Orleans, LA	L 6–13	20,000	
October 7	at Georgia	Sanford Stadium; Athens, GA	L 13–26	12,000	
October 14	Maryland*	Tulane Stadium; New Orleans, LA	W 20–0	10,000	
October 21	at Georgia Tech	Grant Field; Atlanta, GA	W 7–0		
October 28	Auburn	Tulane Stadium; New Orleans, LA (rivalry)	L 7–13	20,000	
November 4	vs. Colgate*	Yankee Stadium; Bronx, NY	W 7–0	20,000	
November 11	Mississippi State	Tulane Stadium; New Orleans, LA	W 33–0		
November 18	Kentucky	Tulane Stadium; New Orleans, LA	W 34–0		
November 25	Sewanee	Tulane Stadium; New Orleans, LA	W 26–9	8,000	
December 2	LSU	Tulane Stadium; New Orleans, LA (Battle for the Rag)	T 7–7	31,000	
*Non-conference game
