= 1933 All-SEC football team =

American college football all-star team

The 1933 All-SEC football team consists of American football players selected to the All-Southeastern Conference (SEC) chosen by various selectors for the 1933 college football season. This was the inaugural SEC season; the All-SEC teams now taking precedence over the All-Southern team. The Associated Press (AP) All-SEC teams are the only ones which become a part of official conference records. The Alabama Crimson Tide won the conference, the only blemish on its conference record a scoreless tie with the Ole Miss Rebels. Tennessee halfback Beattie Feathers was voted SEC Player of the Year.

== All-SEC selections ==
=== Ends ===
- David Ariail, Auburn (AP-1, UP-1)
- Graham Batchelor, Georgia (AP-1, UP-1)
- J. R. Slocum, Georgia Tech (AP-2, UP-2)
- Joe Rupert, Kentucky (AP-2, UP-2)
- Don Hutson, Alabama (College Football Hall of Fame) (AP-3)
- Bart Herrington, Ole Miss (AP-3)

=== Tackles ===
- Jack Torrance, LSU (AP-1, UP-1)
- B. W. Williams, Georgia Tech (AP-3, UP-1)
- Bob Tharpe, Georgia Tech (AP-1)
- Bill Lee, Alabama (AP-2, UP-2)
- Hal Starbuck, Florida (AP-2)
- F. G. McCollum, Auburn (UP-2)
- Jesse Flowers, Ole Miss (AP-3)

=== Guards ===
- Leroy Moorehead, Georgia (AP-1, UP-1)
- Thomas Hupke, Alabama (AP-1, UP-1)
- J. B. Ellis, Tennessee (AP-2, UP-2)
- W. H. Chambliss, Auburn (AP-2, UP-2)
- Bowe, Vanderbilt (AP-3)
- D. Wilcox, Georgia Tech (AP-3)

=== Centers ===
- Talmadge Maples, Tennessee (AP-1, UP-1)
- Homer Robinson, Tulane (AP-2, UP-2)
- Welcome Shearer, Florida (AP-3)

=== Quarterbacks ===
- Ripper Williams, Auburn (AP-1, UP-1)
- Rand Dixon, Vanderbilt (AP-2)
- Byron Griffith, Georgia (UP-2)

=== Halfbacks ===
- Beattie Feathers, Tennessee (College Football Hall of Fame) (AP-1, UP-1)
- Joseph Grant, Georgia (AP-2, UP-1)
- Dixie Howell, Alabama (College Football Hall of Fame) (AP-1)
- Floyd Roberts, Tulane (AP-2)
- Abe Mickal, LSU (College Football Hall of Fame) (UP-2)
- Casy Kimbrell, Auburn (AP-3)
- Homer Key, Georgia (AP-3)
- Bob Herrington, Miss. St. (AP-3)
- George Chapman, Georgia (AP-3)

=== Fullbacks ===
- Ralph Kercheval, Kentucky (AP-1, UP-2 [as hb])
- D. J. Phillips, Georgia Tech (AP-2, UP-2)

== Key ==
AP = Associated Press.

UP = United Press

Bold = Consensus first-team selection by both AP and UP

== See also ==
- 1933 College Football All-America Team
