= 1933 Florida Gators football team =

American college football season

1933 Florida Gators football
- Conference: Southeastern Conference
- Record: 5–3–1 (2–3 SEC)
- Head coach: Dennis K. Stanley (1st season)
- Captain: Sam Davis
- Home stadium: Florida Field

Uniform
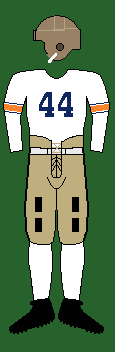

1933 Southeastern Conference football standings
	Conf.					Overall
Team		W		L			W		L
Alabama $	5	–	0	–	1	7	–	1	–	1
LSU	3	–	0	–	2	7	–	0	–	3
Georgia	3	–	1	–	0	8	–	2	–	0
Tennessee	5	–	2	–	0	7	–	3	–	0
Tulane	4	–	2	–	1	6	–	3	–	1
Auburn	2	–	2	–	0	5	–	5	–	0
Ole Miss	2	–	2	–	1	6	–	3	–	2
Vanderbilt	2	–	2	–	2	4	–	3	–	3
Florida	2	–	3	–	0	5	–	3	–	1
Kentucky	2	–	3	–	0	5	–	5	–	0
Georgia Tech	2	–	5	–	0	5	–	5	–	0
Mississippi State	1	–	5	–	1	3	–	6	–	1
Sewanee	0	–	6	–	0	3	–	6	–	0
$ – Conference champion

The 1933 Florida Gators football team represented the University of Florida during the 1933 college football season. The season was Florida alumnus Dennis K. Stanley's first as the head coach of the Florida Gators football team. Stanley, who had been a standout end on the great 1928 Gators team, assembled an all-Florida-alumni coaching staff and led the Gators to a 5–3–1 revival following two consecutive losing seasons in 1931 and 1932.

The 1933 season was also the first for the new Southeastern Conference (SEC), and Stanley's 1933 Florida Gators finished with a 2–3 SEC record and tied for ninth among the thirteen SEC charter members. The highlights of the 1933 season included SEC wins over the Sewanee Tigers and Auburn Tigers, and out-of-conference victories versus the North Carolina Tar Heels and Maryland Terrapins.

== Before the season ==
Dutch Stanley was hired. Quarterback Sam Davis was the first quarterback and captain since Goof Bowyer in 1928. A star on the team was Al Hickland, a 250-pound, three-sport athlete who was also the team's kicker.

== Schedule ==
Date	Opponent	Site	Result	Attendance	Source
September 30	Stetson*	Florida Field; Gainesville, FL	W 28–0	6,000	
October 7	vs. Sewanee	Fairfield Stadium; Jacksonville, FL	W 31–0	7,500	
October 14	at NC State*	Riddick Stadium; Raleigh, NC	T 0–0		
October 21	North Carolina*	Florida Field; Gainesville, FL	W 9–0	9,000	
October 28	at Tennessee	Shields–Watkins Field; Knoxville, TN (rivalry)	L 6–13		
November 4	vs. Georgia	Fairfield Stadium; Jacksonville, FL (rivalry)	L 0–14		
November 11	at Georgia Tech	Grant Field; Atlanta, GA	L 7–19	10,000	
November 25	Auburn^{†}	Florida Field; Gainesville, FL (rivalry)	W 14–7	12,000	
December 2	vs. Maryland*	Plant Field; Tampa, FL	W 19–0	10,000	
*Non-conference game; ^{†}Homecoming
