= 1933 Sewanee Tigers football team =

American college football season

1933 Sewanee Tigers football
- Conference: Southeastern Conference
- Record: 3–6 (0–6 SEC)
- Head coach: Harry E. Clark (3rd season)
- Home stadium: Hardee Field

1933 Southeastern Conference football standings
	Conf.					Overall
Team		W		L			W		L
Alabama $	5	–	0	–	1	7	–	1	–	1
LSU	3	–	0	–	2	7	–	0	–	3
Georgia	3	–	1	–	0	8	–	2	–	0
Tennessee	5	–	2	–	0	7	–	3	–	0
Tulane	4	–	2	–	1	6	–	3	–	1
Auburn	2	–	2	–	0	5	–	5	–	0
Ole Miss	2	–	2	–	1	6	–	3	–	2
Vanderbilt	2	–	2	–	2	4	–	3	–	3
Florida	2	–	3	–	0	5	–	3	–	1
Kentucky	2	–	3	–	0	5	–	5	–	0
Georgia Tech	2	–	5	–	0	5	–	5	–	0
Mississippi State	1	–	5	–	1	3	–	6	–	1
Sewanee	0	–	6	–	0	3	–	6	–	0
$ – Conference champion

The 1933 Sewanee Tigers football team was an American football team that represented Sewanee: The University of the South as a member of the Southeastern Conference during the 1933 college football season. In their third season under head coach Harry E. Clark, Sewanee compiled a 3–6 record.

== Schedule ==
Date	Opponent	Site	Result	Attendance	Source
September 30	at Kentucky	McLean Stadium; Lexington, KY	L 0–7	8,000	
October 7	at Florida	Fairfield Stadium; Jacksonville, FL	L 0–31	7,500	
October 14	at Southwestern (TN)*	Fargason Field; Memphis, TN (rivalry)	W 12–7		
October 21	at Ole Miss	Hemingway Stadium; Oxford, MS	L 0–41		
October 28	Cumberland (TN)*	Hardee Field; Sewanee, TN	W 14–0		
November 4	Tennessee Tech*	Hardee Field; Sewanee, TN	W 13–0		
November 11	at Vanderbilt	Dudley Field; Nashville, TN (rivalry)	L 14–27		
November 18	at Mississippi State	Scott Field; Starkville, MS	L 13–26	3,000	
November 25	at Tulane	Tulane Stadium; New Orleans, LA	L 9–26	8,000	
*Non-conference game
