= 1933 Auburn Tigers football team =

American college football season

1933 Auburn Tigers football
- Conference: Southeastern Conference
- Record: 5–5 (2–2 SEC)
- Head coach: Chet A. Wynne (4th season)
- Captain: Ripper Williams
- Home stadium: Drake Field; Legion Field; Cramton Bowl

1933 Southeastern Conference football standings
| | Conf. | | | | | Overall |
| Team | | W | | L | | | W | | L |
|---|---|---|---|---|---|---|---|---|---|---|
| Alabama $ | 5 | – | 0 | – | 1 | 7 | – | 1 | – | 1 |
| LSU | 3 | – | 0 | – | 2 | 7 | – | 0 | – | 3 |
| Georgia | 3 | – | 1 | – | 0 | 8 | – | 2 | – | 0 |
| Tennessee | 5 | – | 2 | – | 0 | 7 | – | 3 | – | 0 |
| Tulane | 4 | – | 2 | – | 1 | 6 | – | 3 | – | 1 |
| Auburn | 2 | – | 2 | – | 0 | 5 | – | 5 | – | 0 |
| Ole Miss | 2 | – | 2 | – | 1 | 6 | – | 3 | – | 2 |
| Vanderbilt | 2 | – | 2 | – | 2 | 4 | – | 3 | – | 3 |
| Florida | 2 | – | 3 | – | 0 | 5 | – | 3 | – | 1 |
| Kentucky | 2 | – | 3 | – | 0 | 5 | – | 5 | – | 0 |
| Georgia Tech | 2 | – | 5 | – | 0 | 5 | – | 5 | – | 0 |
| Mississippi State | 1 | – | 5 | – | 1 | 3 | – | 6 | – | 1 |
| Sewanee | 0 | – | 6 | – | 0 | 3 | – | 6 | – | 0 |
$ – Conference champion

The 1933 Auburn Tigers football team was an American football team that represented Auburn University as a member of the Southeastern Conference (SEC) during the 1933 college football season. In their fourth year under head coach Chet A. Wynne, the Tigers compiled an overall record of 5–5, with a conference record of 2–2, and finished sixth in the SEC.

== Schedule ==
| Date | Opponent | Site | Result | Attendance | Source |
|---|---|---|---|---|---|
| September 22 | Birmingham–Southern* | Cramton Bowl; Montgomery, AL | W 20–7 | 10,000 | |
| September 29 | Howard (AL)* | Legion Field; Birmingham, AL | W 18–7 | | |
| October 14 | at Georgia Tech | Grant Field; Atlanta, GA (rivalry) | L 6–16 | | |
| October 21 | at George Washington* | Griffith Stadium; Washington, DC | L 6–19 | | |
| October 28 | at Tulane | Tulane Stadium; New Orleans, LA (rivalry) | W 13–7 | 20,000 | |
| November 4 | at Duke* | Duke Stadium; Durham, NC | L 7–13 | | |
| November 11 | Oglethorpe*^{†} | Drake Field; Auburn, AL | W 27–6 | 6,000 | |
| November 18 | vs. Georgia | Memorial Stadium; Columbus, GA (rivalry) | W 14–6 | | |
| November 25 | at Florida | Florida Field; Gainesville, FL (rivalry) | L 7–14 | 12,000 | |
| December 2 | South Carolina* | Legion Field; Birmingham, AL | L 14–16 | 8,000 | |
*Non-conference game; ^{†}Homecoming
