= Luis Chico Goerne =

Mexican lawyer

Luis Chico Goerne (1892–1960) was a Mexican lawyer, academic, and rector. He was an expert in penal law who wrote and lectured in the fields of law and sociology and made significant contributions to Mexico's penal codes of 1929 and 1931.

Goerne studied at the Universidad de Guanajuato, where he received the title of lawyer in 1915. He later moved to Mexico City, where he was a professor at the Escuela Libre de Derecho until 1923 when he accepted a role as professor at the National School of Jurisprudence at the National Autonomous University of Mexico (Spanish: Universidad Nacional Autónoma de México, UNAM).

In August 1929, he was appointed director of the Faculty of Law at UNAM, shortly after the university was given autonomy. He served as rector of the school from 1935 to 1938.
