= Ripper Williams =

American football quarterback

Profile
- Position: Quarterback

Personal information
- Listed height: 5 ft 9 in (1.75 m)
- Listed weight: 153 lb (69 kg)

Career information
- College: Auburn (1932–1933)

Awards and highlights
- First-team All-SEC (1933); Colbert County Sports Hall of Fame

George "Ripper" Williams was a college football player and a prominent quarterback for the Auburn Tigers. He led the team to an undefeated 1932 season and served as captain of the 1933 team. Williams is a member of the Colbert County Sports Hall of Fame.
