= Ross MacKechnie =

American football coach (1895–1967)

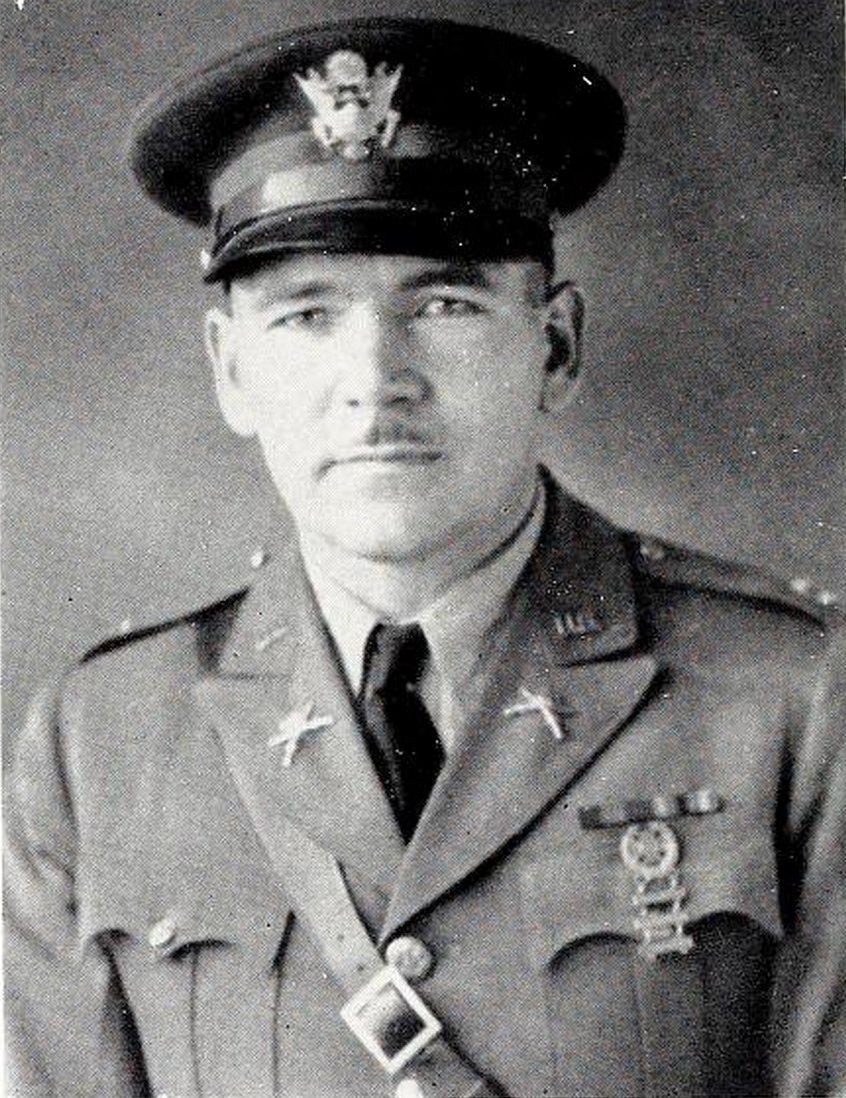
- MacKechnie pictured in Reveille 1934, Mississippi State yearbook

Biographical details
- Born: December 24, 1895; Grahams Island, North Dakota, U.S.
- Died: August 15, 1967 (aged 71); San Francisco County, California, U.S.
- Education: University of Washington

Coaching career (HC unless noted)
- 1933–1934: Mississippi State

Head coaching record
- Overall: 7–12–1

Archibald Ross MacKechnie (December 24, 1895 – August 15, 1967) was an American college football coach and United States Army officer. He served as the head football coach at Mississippi State College—now known as Mississippi State University—from 1933 to 1934, compiling a record of 7–12–1. A captain in the Army at the time, MacKechnie also had responsibility for instructing the Reserve Officers' Training Corps program at the time.

During World War II, MacKechnie commanded the 162nd Infantry Regiment during operations in New Guinea during the Salamaua–Lae campaign.

== Head coaching record ==
Year	Team	Overall	Conference	Standing	Bowl/playoffs
Mississippi State Maroons (Southeastern Conference) (1933–1934)
1933	Mississippi State	3–6–1	1–5–1	12th	
1934	Mississippi State	4–6	0–5	12th	
Mississippi State:		7–12–1	1–10–1		
Total:		7–12–1			
