= 1933 Georgia Bulldogs football team =

American college football season

1933 Georgia Bulldogs football
- Conference: Southeastern Conference
- Record: 8–2 (3–1 SEC)
- Head coach: Harry Mehre (6th season)
- Home stadium: Sanford Stadium

1933 Southeastern Conference football standings
	Conf.					Overall
Team		W		L			W		L
Alabama $	5	–	0	–	1	7	–	1	–	1
LSU	3	–	0	–	2	7	–	0	–	3
Georgia	3	–	1	–	0	8	–	2	–	0
Tennessee	5	–	2	–	0	7	–	3	–	0
Tulane	4	–	2	–	1	6	–	3	–	1
Auburn	2	–	2	–	0	5	–	5	–	0
Ole Miss	2	–	2	–	1	6	–	3	–	2
Vanderbilt	2	–	2	–	2	4	–	3	–	3
Florida	2	–	3	–	0	5	–	3	–	1
Kentucky	2	–	3	–	0	5	–	5	–	0
Georgia Tech	2	–	5	–	0	5	–	5	–	0
Mississippi State	1	–	5	–	1	3	–	6	–	1
Sewanee	0	–	6	–	0	3	–	6	–	0
$ – Conference champion

The 1933 Georgia Bulldogs football team represented the University of Georgia during the 1933 college football season. The Bulldogs completed the season with an 8–2 record. This was the first year of the Southeastern Conference (SEC).

== Schedule ==
Date	Opponent	Site	Result	Attendance	Source
September 30	NC State*	Sanford Stadium; Athens, GA	W 20–10		
October 7	Tulane	Sanford Stadium; Athens, GA	W 26–13	12,000	
October 14	at North Carolina*	Kenan Memorial Stadium; Chapel Hill, NC	W 30–0		
October 20	at Mercer*	Centennial Stadium; Macon, GA	W 13–12	12,000	
October 28	NYU*^{†}	Sanford Stadium; Athens, GA	W 25–0	25,000	
November 4	vs. Florida	Fairfield Stadium; Jacksonville, FL (rivalry)	W 14–0		
November 11	at Yale*	Yale Bowl; New Haven, CT	W 7–0	35,000	
November 18	vs. Auburn	Memorial Stadium; Columbus, GA (rivalry)	L 6–14		
November 25	at Georgia Tech	Grant Field; Atlanta, GA (rivalry)	W 7–6	35,000	
December 2	at USC*	Los Angeles Memorial Coliseum; Los Angeles, CA	L 0–31	45,000	
*Non-conference game; ^{†}Homecoming
