= Harry Gamage =

American football player and coach (1900–1994)

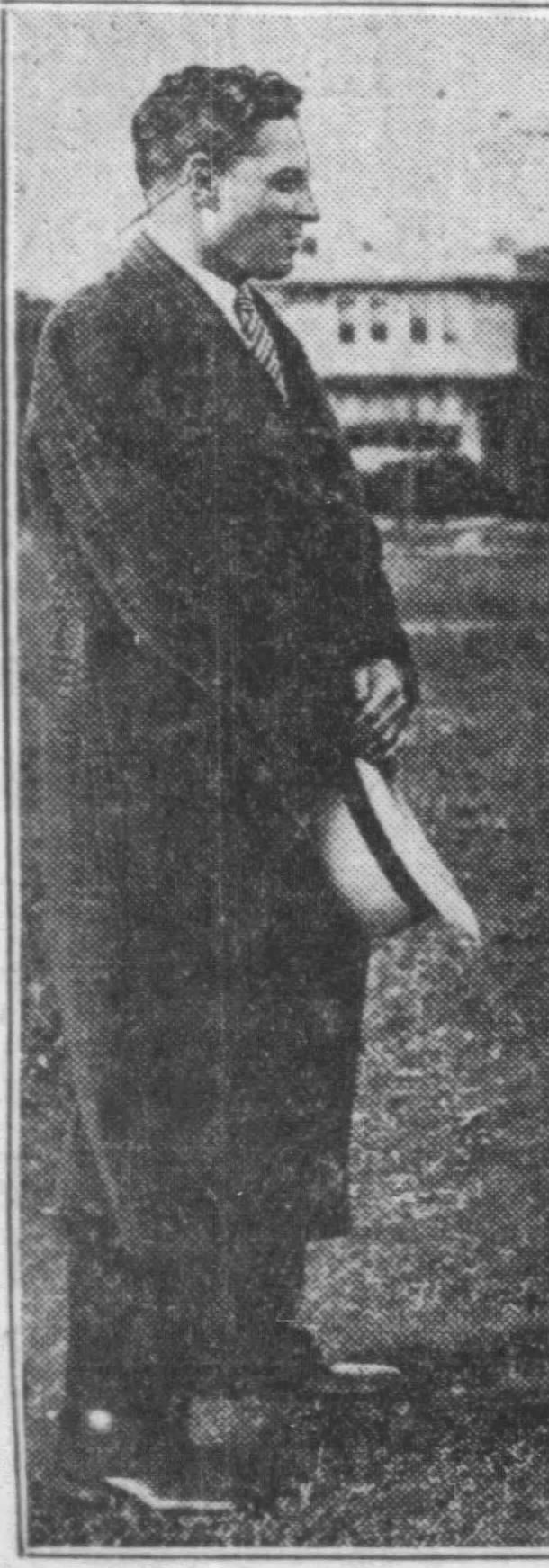
- Gamage in 1928

Biographical details
- Born: February 3, 1900; Macomb, Illinois, U.S.
- Died: August 22, 1994 (aged 94); Mesa, Arizona, U.S.

Playing career

Football
- 1919: Western Illinois
- 1921: Illinois
- Position: Center

Coaching career (HC unless noted)

Football
- 1922: Fairmont HS (WV)
- 1923: Parkersburg HS (WV)
- 1924–1926: Illinois (freshmen)
- 1927–1933: Kentucky
- 1934–1941: South Dakota
- 1946–1955: South Dakota

Basketball
- 1922–1923: Fairmont HS (WV)

Head coaching record
- Overall: 114–92–12 (college football)

Accomplishments and honors

Championships
- 4 NCC (1938–1939, 1947, 1951)

Harry G. Gamage (February 3, 1900 – August 22, 1994) was an American football player and coach. He served as the head football coach the University of Kentucky from 1927 to 1933 and at the University of South Dakota from 1934 to 1941 and again from 1946 to 1955, compiling a career college football record of 114–92–12.

A native of Macomb, Illinois, Gamage attended and played football at Western Illinois State Normal School—now Western Illinois University—and the University of Illinois at Urbana–Champaign.

He coached at University of Kentucky from 1927 to 1933 and, during his tenure, compiled a 32–25–5 record, including his best season of 6–1–1 in 1929. He subsequently became the head football coach at the University of South Dakota, where he served from 1934 to 1941 and, following World War II service, from 1946 to 1955.

== Head coaching record ==
=== College football ===
Year	Team	Overall	Conference	Standing	Bowl/playoffs
Kentucky Wildcats (Southern Conference) (1927–1932)
1927	Kentucky	3–6–1	1–5	21st	
1928	Kentucky	4–3–1	2–2–1	T–9th	
1929	Kentucky	6–1–1	3–1–1	6th	
1930	Kentucky	5–3	4–3	T–10th	
1931	Kentucky	5–2–2	4–2–2	6th	
1932	Kentucky	4–5	4–5	12th	
Kentucky Wildcats (Southeastern Conference) (1933)
1933	Kentucky	5–5	2–3	T–9th	
Kentucky:		32–25–5	18–21–4		
South Dakota Coyotes (North Central Conference) (1934–1941)
1934	South Dakota	2–7	0–4	5th	
1935	South Dakota	5–3–1	2–2–1	4th	
1936	South Dakota	4–3–2	3–1	2nd	
1937	South Dakota	6–4	4–1	2nd	
1938	South Dakota	7–1	5–0	1st	
1939	South Dakota	4–5	4–1	T–1st	
1940	South Dakota	4–5–1	2–1–1	3rd	
1941	South Dakota	6–2	4–1	2nd	
South Dakota Coyotes (North Central Conference) (1946–1955)
1946	South Dakota	2–4	1–2	6th	
1947	South Dakota	7–2	4–0	1st	
1948	South Dakota	7–3	4–1	2nd	
1949	South Dakota	2–5–2	2–2–2	5th	
1950	South Dakota	4–5	3–3	5th	
1951	South Dakota	7–1	6–0	1st	
1952	South Dakota	4–3–1	3–2–1	T–3rd	
1953	South Dakota	2–6	2–4	T–4th	
1954	South Dakota	5–4	3–3	T–3rd	
1955	South Dakota	4–4	3–3	T–4th	
South Dakota:		82–67–7	55–31–5		
Total:		114–92–12			
National championship Conference title Conference division title or championship game berth
