= 1933 Tennessee Volunteers football team =

American college football season

1933 Tennessee Volunteers football
- Conference: Southeastern Conference
- Record: 7–3 (5–2 SEC)
- Head coach: Robert Neyland (8th season)
- Offensive scheme: Single-wing
- Captain: Talmadge Maples
- Home stadium: Shields–Watkins Field

1933 Southeastern Conference football standings
| | Conf. | | | | | Overall |
| Team | | W | | L | | | W | | L |
|---|---|---|---|---|---|---|---|---|---|---|
| Alabama $ | 5 | – | 0 | – | 1 | 7 | – | 1 | – | 1 |
| LSU | 3 | – | 0 | – | 2 | 7 | – | 0 | – | 3 |
| Georgia | 3 | – | 1 | – | 0 | 8 | – | 2 | – | 0 |
| Tennessee | 5 | – | 2 | – | 0 | 7 | – | 3 | – | 0 |
| Tulane | 4 | – | 2 | – | 1 | 6 | – | 3 | – | 1 |
| Auburn | 2 | – | 2 | – | 0 | 5 | – | 5 | – | 0 |
| Ole Miss | 2 | – | 2 | – | 1 | 6 | – | 3 | – | 2 |
| Vanderbilt | 2 | – | 2 | – | 2 | 4 | – | 3 | – | 3 |
| Florida | 2 | – | 3 | – | 0 | 5 | – | 3 | – | 1 |
| Kentucky | 2 | – | 3 | – | 0 | 5 | – | 5 | – | 0 |
| Georgia Tech | 2 | – | 5 | – | 0 | 5 | – | 5 | – | 0 |
| Mississippi State | 1 | – | 5 | – | 1 | 3 | – | 6 | – | 1 |
| Sewanee | 0 | – | 6 | – | 0 | 3 | – | 6 | – | 0 |
$ – Conference champion

The 1933 Tennessee Volunteers football team represented the University of Tennessee in the 1933 college football season. Robert Neyland served his eighth year as head coach of the Volunteers. This was the first year that the Vols played in the newly formed Southeastern Conference.

On October 21, Tennessee suffered a 12–6 defeat at Shields–Watkins Field to Alabama, snapping a 55-game winning streak at home that dated back to a win over Emory and Henry on October 3, 1925. This was also Tennessee's first homecoming loss. A week earlier, the Volunteers lost to Duke in Durham, North Carolina, 10–2. It was Tennessee's first defeat since a loss on October 18, 1930, to Alabama. Between those two losses, Tennessee, compiled a record of 26–0–2.

== Schedule ==
| Date | Opponent | Site | Result | Attendance | Source |
|---|---|---|---|---|---|
| September 30 | VPI* | Shields–Watkins Field; Knoxville, TN | W 27–0 | 15,000 | |
| October 7 | Mississippi State | Shields–Watkins Field; Knoxville, TN | W 20–0 | | |
| October 14 | at Duke* | Duke Stadium; Durham, NC | L 2–10 | 22,000 | |
| October 21 | Alabama^{†} | Shields–Watkins Field; Knoxville, TN (rivalry) | L 6–13 | 25,000 | |
| October 28 | Florida | Shields–Watkins Field; Knoxville, TN (rivalry) | W 13–6 | | |
| November 4 | at George Washington* | Griffith Stadium; Washington, DC | W 13–0 | 25,000 | |
| November 11 | Ole Miss | Shields–Watkins Field; Knoxville, TN (rivalry) | W 35–6 | 12,000 | |
| November 18 | Vanderbilt | Shields–Watkins Field; Knoxville, TN (rivalry) | W 33–6 | 20,000 | |
| November 30 | at Kentucky | McLean Stadium; Lexington, KY (rivalry) | W 27–0 | | |
| December 9 | at LSU | Tiger Stadium; Baton Rouge, LA | L 0–7 | 15,000 | |
*Non-conference game; ^{†}Homecoming
