= Ralph Kercheval =

American football player (1911–2010)

- Kercheval in 1935

No. 26; 40
- Positions: Running back, punter, kicker

Personal information
- Born: December 1, 1911; Salt Lick, Kentucky, U.S.
- Died: October 6, 2010 (aged 98); Lexington, Kentucky, U.S.
- Listed height: 6 ft 1 in (1.85 m)
- Listed weight: 190 lb (86 kg)

Career information
- College: Kentucky

Career history
- Kentucky Wildcats (1932–1933); Brooklyn Dodgers (1934–1940)

Awards and highlights
- Third-team All-American (1933); All-Southern (1932); First-team All-SEC (1933); AP Southeast All-Time team (1920–1969 era)

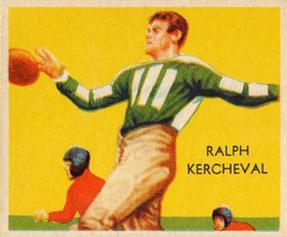

Ralph Godfrey Kercheval (December 1, 1911 – October 6, 2010) was an American football running back and punter. He played seven seasons in the National Football League (NFL) for the Brooklyn Dodgers. He was a prominent football player in college at Kentucky, chosen as the placekicker for an Associated Press Southeast Area All-Time football team 1920–1969 era.

== Thoroughbred horse racing ==
Kercheval grew up in the heartland of American Thoroughbred horse breeding. He graduated from the University of Kentucky with a degree in animal husbandry and before playing pro football went to work for renowned racing stable owner, Cornelius Vanderbilt Whitney. When his football career ended, Kercheval returned to the Thoroughbred horse racing industry.

During World War II, Kercheval served with the cavalry in the United States Army.

He worked for a number of years as a trainer and was manager of Alfred G. Vanderbilt II's Sagamore Farm in Glyndon, Maryland from 1948 to 1958 and from 1969 to 1979 with Walter J. Salmon Jr.'s Mereworth Farm in his native Lexington. During 1971–1972, Kercheval also served as the President of the Thoroughbred Club of America.

He was a distant cousin of Dallas star Ken Kercheval.
