= 1933 Kentucky Wildcats football team =

American college football season

1933 Kentucky Wildcats football
- Conference: Southeastern Conference
- Record: 5–5 (2–3 SEC)
- Head coach: Harry Gamage (7th season)
- Captain: Howard Kreuter
- Home stadium: McLean Stadium

1933 Southeastern Conference football standings
	Conf.					Overall
Team		W		L			W		L
Alabama $	5	–	0	–	1	7	–	1	–	1
LSU	3	–	0	–	2	7	–	0	–	3
Georgia	3	–	1	–	0	8	–	2	–	0
Tennessee	5	–	2	–	0	7	–	3	–	0
Tulane	4	–	2	–	1	6	–	3	–	1
Auburn	2	–	2	–	0	5	–	5	–	0
Ole Miss	2	–	2	–	1	6	–	3	–	2
Vanderbilt	2	–	2	–	2	4	–	3	–	3
Florida	2	–	3	–	0	5	–	3	–	1
Kentucky	2	–	3	–	0	5	–	5	–	0
Georgia Tech	2	–	5	–	0	5	–	5	–	0
Mississippi State	1	–	5	–	1	3	–	6	–	1
Sewanee	0	–	6	–	0	3	–	6	–	0
$ – Conference champion

The 1933 Kentucky Wildcats football team was an American football team that represented the University of Kentucky as a member of the Southeastern Conference (SEC) during the 1933 college football season. In their seventh and final season under head coach Harry Gamage, the Wildcats compiled an overall record of 5–5 record with a mark of 2–3 against conference opponents, tied for ninth place in the SEC, and were outscored by a total of 116 to 91. The team played its home games at McLean Stadium in Lexington, Kentucky.

== Schedule ==
Date	Opponent	Site	Result	Attendance	Source
September 23	Maryville*	McLean Stadium; Lexington, KY	W 46–2		
September 30	Sewanee	McLean Stadium; Lexington, KY	W 7–0	8,000	
October 7	Georgia Tech	McLean Stadium; Lexington, KY	W 7–6		
October 14	at Cincinnati*	Nippert Stadium; Cincinnati, OH	W 3–0		
October 21	at Washington & Lee*	Maher Field; Roanoke, VA	L 0–7		
October 28	Duke*	McLean Stadium; Lexington, KY	L 7–14	15,000	
November 4	at Alabama	Legion Field; Birmingham, AL	L 0–20	15,000	
November 11	VMI*	McLean Stadium; Lexington, KY	W 21–6		
November 18	at Tulane	Tulane Stadium; New Orleans, LA	L 0–34		
November 30	Tennessee	McLean Stadium; Lexington, KY (rivalry)	L 0–27		
*Non-conference game
