= 1933 Vanderbilt Commodores football team =

American college football season

1933 Vanderbilt Commodores football
- Conference: Southeastern Conference
- Record: 4–3–3 (2–2–2 SEC)
- Head coach: Dan McGugin (29th season)
- Captain: Game captains
- Home stadium: Dudley Field

1933 Southeastern Conference football standings
	Conf.					Overall
Team		W		L			W		L
Alabama $	5	–	0	–	1	7	–	1	–	1
LSU	3	–	0	–	2	7	–	0	–	3
Georgia	3	–	1	–	0	8	–	2	–	0
Tennessee	5	–	2	–	0	7	–	3	–	0
Tulane	4	–	2	–	1	6	–	3	–	1
Auburn	2	–	2	–	0	5	–	5	–	0
Ole Miss	2	–	2	–	1	6	–	3	–	2
Vanderbilt	2	–	2	–	2	4	–	3	–	3
Florida	2	–	3	–	0	5	–	3	–	1
Kentucky	2	–	3	–	0	5	–	5	–	0
Georgia Tech	2	–	5	–	0	5	–	5	–	0
Mississippi State	1	–	5	–	1	3	–	6	–	1
Sewanee	0	–	6	–	0	3	–	6	–	0
$ – Conference champion

The 1933 Vanderbilt Commodores football team represented Vanderbilt University as a member of the Southeastern Conference (SEC) during the 1933 college football season. The 1933 season was Dan McGugin's 29th year as head coach the first year of play for the SEC. Vanderbilt was a founding member of the conference.

== Schedule ==
Date	Opponent	Site	Result	Attendance	Source
September 23	Cumberland (TN)*	Dudley Field; Nashville, TN	W 50–0	12,000	
September 30	at Oklahoma*	Oklahoma Memorial Stadium; Norman, OK	T 0–0	18,000	
October 7	North Carolina*	Dudley Field; Nashville, TN	W 20–13	6,000	
October 14	at Ohio State*	Ohio Stadium; Columbus, OH	L 0–20	21,568	
October 21	Mississippi State	Dudley Field; Nashville, TN	T 7–7	7,000	
October 28	LSU	Tiger Stadium; Baton Rouge, LA	T 7–7	20,000	
November 4	at Georgia Tech	Grant Field; Atlanta, GA (rivalry)	W 9–6		
November 11	Sewanee	Dudley Field; Nashville, TN (rivalry)	W 27–14		
November 18	at Tennessee	Shields–Watkins Field; Knoxville, TN (rivalry)	L 6–33	20,000	
November 30	Alabama	Dudley Field; Nashville, TN	L 0–7	15,000	
*Non-conference game
