= Bill Lee (American football) =

American football player (1911–1998)

- Bill Lee in 1935

No. 21, 40
- Position: Tackle

Personal information
- Born: August 19, 1911; Eutaw, Alabama, US
- Died: June 23, 1998 (aged 86); Eutaw, Alabama, US
- Listed height: 6 ft 2 in (1.88 m)
- Listed weight: 231 lb (105 kg)

Career information
- College: Alabama

Career history
- Brooklyn Dodgers (1935–1937); Green Bay Packers (1937–1942, 1946)

Awards and highlights
- NFL champion (1939); NFL 1930s All-Decade Team; National champion (1934); Consensus All-American (1934); First-team All-SEC (1934); Second-team All-SEC (1933)

Career statistics
- Games played: 82
- Starts: 60
- Interceptions: 1
- Stats at Pro Football Reference

William Earl Lee Sr. (August 19, 1911 – June 23, 1998) was an American football lineman who played collegiately for the Alabama Crimson Tide and professionally for the Brooklyn Dodgers and Green Bay Packers of the National Football League (NFL). For excellent play during his nine-year NFL career, Lee was named to the NFL's All-Decade Team of the 1930s by the Professional Football Hall of Fame in 2010.

== Biography ==
Bill Lee was born August 19, 1911, in Eutaw, Alabama.

Lee played in 82 career games while starting in 60 of them. He played in each game of his first two seasons with the Dodgers; after playing five games with the Dodgers, he was moved to the Green Bay Packers, where he played in four games. In his next four seasons, he played in every game of those seasons.

He played in just one game of the 1942 season, when it was interrupted by the outbreak of World War II.

After the war, Lee resumed his NFL career with the Packers, but saw action in just four games in 1946.

In 2010, Lee was named to the All-1930s team by the Professional Football Hall of Fame. Lee is one of ten players that were named to the National Football League 1930s All-Decade Team that have not been inducted into the Pro Football Hall of Fame.
