= 1933 Mississippi State Maroons football team =

American college football season

1933 Mississippi State Maroons football
- Conference: Southeastern Conference
- Record: 3–6–1 (1–5–1 SEC)
- Head coach: Ross MacKechnie (1st season)
- Home stadium: Scott Field

1933 Southeastern Conference football standings
	Conf.					Overall
Team		W		L			W		L
Alabama $	5	–	0	–	1	7	–	1	–	1
LSU	3	–	0	–	2	7	–	0	–	3
Georgia	3	–	1	–	0	8	–	2	–	0
Tennessee	5	–	2	–	0	7	–	3	–	0
Tulane	4	–	2	–	1	6	–	3	–	1
Auburn	2	–	2	–	0	5	–	5	–	0
Ole Miss	2	–	2	–	1	6	–	3	–	2
Vanderbilt	2	–	2	–	2	4	–	3	–	3
Florida	2	–	3	–	0	5	–	3	–	1
Kentucky	2	–	3	–	0	5	–	5	–	0
Georgia Tech	2	–	5	–	0	5	–	5	–	0
Mississippi State	1	–	5	–	1	3	–	6	–	1
Sewanee	0	–	6	–	0	3	–	6	–	0
$ – Conference champion

The 1933 Mississippi State Maroons football team was an American football team that represented Mississippi State College (now known as Mississippi State University) as a member of the Southeastern Conference (SEC) during the 1933 college football season. In their first year under head coach Ross MacKechnie, the Maroons compiled an overall record of 3–6–1, with a conference record of 1–5–1, and finished 12th in the SEC.

== Schedule ==
Date	Opponent	Site	Result	Attendance	Source
September 30	Millsaps*	Scott Field; Starkville, MS	W 12–0		
October 7	at Tennessee	Shields–Watkins Field; Knoxville, TN	L 0–20		
October 14	at Alabama	Denny Stadium; Tuscaloosa, AL (rivalry)	L 0–18	5,000	
October 21	at Vanderbilt	Dudley Field; Nashville, TN	T 7–7	7,000	
October 27	Southwestern (TN)*	Scott Field; Starkville, MS	L 0–6		
November 3	Mississippi College*	Scott Field; Starkville, MS	W 18–0		
November 11	at Tulane	Tulane Stadium; New Orleans, LA	L 0–33		
November 18	Sewanee	Scott Field; Starkville, MS	W 26–13	3,000	
November 25	vs. LSU	Brown Field; Monroe, LA (rivalry)	L 6–21	6,000	
December 2	at Ole Miss	Hemingway Stadium; Oxford, MS (Egg Bowl)	L 0–31		
*Non-conference game
