= 1933 Ole Miss Rebels football team =

American college football season

1933 Ole Miss Rebels football
- Conference: Southeastern Conference
- Record: 6–3–2 (2–2–1 SEC)
- Head coach: Ed Walker (4th season)
- Home stadium: Hemingway Stadium

1933 Southeastern Conference football standings
	Conf.					Overall
Team		W		L			W		L
Alabama $	5	–	0	–	1	7	–	1	–	1
LSU	3	–	0	–	2	7	–	0	–	3
Georgia	3	–	1	–	0	8	–	2	–	0
Tennessee	5	–	2	–	0	7	–	3	–	0
Tulane	4	–	2	–	1	6	–	3	–	1
Auburn	2	–	2	–	0	5	–	5	–	0
Ole Miss	2	–	2	–	1	6	–	3	–	2
Vanderbilt	2	–	2	–	2	4	–	3	–	3
Florida	2	–	3	–	0	5	–	3	–	1
Kentucky	2	–	3	–	0	5	–	5	–	0
Georgia Tech	2	–	5	–	0	5	–	5	–	0
Mississippi State	1	–	5	–	1	3	–	6	–	1
Sewanee	0	–	6	–	0	3	–	6	–	0
$ – Conference champion

The 1933 Ole Miss Rebels football team was an American football team that represented the University of Mississippi (Ole Miss) as a member of the Southeastern Conference (SEC) during the 1933 college football season. In their fourth year under head coach Ed Walker, the Rebels compiled an overall record of 6–3–2, with a conference record of 2–2–1, and finished seventh in the SEC.

== Schedule ==
Date	Opponent	Site	Result	Attendance	Source
September 23	at Southwestern (TN)*	Fargason Field; Memphis, TN	T 6–6	4,000	
September 30	Mississippi State Teachers*	Hemingway Stadium; Oxford, MS	W 45–0		
October 7	at Alabama	Legion Field; Birmingham, AL (rivalry)	T 0–0		
October 14	at Marquette*	Marquette Stadium; Milwaukee, WI	W 7–0	8,000	
October 21	Sewanee	Hemingway Stadium; Oxford, MS	W 41–0		
October 28	Clemson	Greer Field; Meridian, MS	W 13–0		
November 4	Birmingham–Southern*	Hemingway Stadium; Oxford, MS	W 12–0		
November 11	at Tennessee	Shields–Watkins Field; Knoxville, TN (rivalry)	L 6–35		
November 18	at LSU	Tiger Stadium; Baton Rouge, LA (rivalry)	L 0–31		
November 25	Centenary*	Municipal Stadium; Jackson, MS	L 6–7		
December 2	Mississippi State	Hemingway Stadium; Oxford, MS (Egg Bowl)	W 31–0		
*Non-conference game
