= Thomas Hupke =

American football player (1910–1959)

Tom Hupke
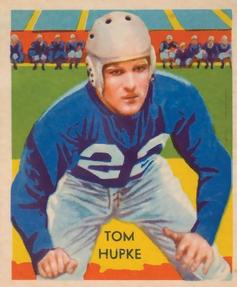

No. 22, 1
- Position: Guard

Personal information
- Born: December 29, 1910; East Chicago, Indiana, U.S.
- Died: September 8, 1959 (aged 48); Detroit, Michigan, U.S.
- Listed height: 5 ft 10 in (1.78 m)
- Listed weight: 192 lb (87 kg)

Career information
- College: Alabama

Career history
- Detroit Lions (1934–1937); Cleveland Rams (1938–1939)

Awards and highlights
- NFL champion (1935); Second-team All-American (1933); First-team All-Southern (1932); First-team All-SEC (1933)
- Stats at Pro Football Reference

Thomas George Hupke (December 29, 1910 – September 8, 1959) was an American football player. He played college football at the University of Alabama from 1930 to 1933 and was selected as an All-American in 1933. During the four years Hupke played for the Crimson Tide, the team compiled a record of 34–4–1. He subsequently played professional football for six years with the Detroit Lions (1934–1937) and the Cleveland Rams (1938–1939). He was a member of the 1935 Detroit Lions team that won the 1935 NFL Championship Game. In September 1959, Hupke died in Detroit at age 48 after a long illness.

== See also ==
- 1932 College Football All-America Team
- 1933 College Football All-America Team
- List of Alabama Crimson Tide football All-Americans
