= 1934 Southeastern Conference football season =

- Sport: Football
- Duration: September 21, 1934 – January 1, 1935
- Teams: 13
- Champion: Tulane; Alabama

SEC seasons
- 1933 1935

1934 Southeastern Conference football standings
	Conf.					Overall
Team		W		L			W		L
No. 11 Tulane +	8	–	0	–	0	10	–	1	–	0
No. 6 Alabama +	7	–	0	–	0	10	–	0	–	0
Tennessee	5	–	1	–	0	8	–	2	–	0
LSU	4	–	2	–	0	7	–	2	–	2
Georgia	3	–	2	–	0	7	–	3	–	0
Vanderbilt	4	–	3	–	0	6	–	3	–	0
Florida	2	–	2	–	1	6	–	3	–	1
Ole Miss	2	–	3	–	1	4	–	5	–	1
Kentucky	1	–	3	–	0	5	–	5	–	0
Auburn	1	–	6	–	0	2	–	8	–	0
Sewanee	0	–	4	–	0	2	–	7	–	0
Mississippi State	0	–	5	–	0	4	–	6	–	0
Georgia Tech	0	–	6	–	0	1	–	9	–	0
+ – Conference co-champions; Rankings from Dickinson System

The 1934 Southeastern Conference football season was the second season of college football played by the member schools of the Southeastern Conference (SEC) and was a part of the 1934 college football season. Tulane compiled a 10–1 overall record, with a conference record of 8–0; and, Alabama compiled a 10–0 overall record, with a conference record of 7–0, and were SEC co-champions. Five of the 13 selectors recognized as "major" by the NCAA (Berryman, Dunkel, Houlgate, Poling, and Williamson – all match systems) recognize the 1934 Alabama team as the national champion.

== Results and team statistics ==
Conf. rank	Team	Head coach	Overall record	Conf. record	DS final	PPG	PAG
1 (tie)	Tulane	Ted Cox	10–1–0 (.909)	8–0–0 (1.000)	#11	19.5	7.5
1 (tie)	Alabama	Frank Thomas	10–0–0 (1.000)	7–0–0 (1.000)	#6	31.6	4.5
3	Tennessee	Robert Neyland	8–2–0 (.800)	5–1–0 (.833)	NR	17.5	5.8
4	LSU	Biff Jones	7–2–2 (.727)	4–2–0 (.667)	NR	15.6	7.0
5	Georgia	Harry Mehre	7–3–0 (.700)	3–2–0 (.600)	NR	14.1	5.6
6	Vanderbilt	Dan McGugin	6–3–0 (.667)	4–3–0 (.571)	NR	11.7	11.1
7	Florida	Dennis K. Stanley	6–3–1 (.650)	2–2–1 (.500)	NR	11.3	11.0
8	Ole Miss	Ed Walker	4–5–1 (.450)	2–3–1 (.417)	NR	11.4	9.8
9	Kentucky	Chet A. Wynne	5–5–0 (.500)	1–3–0 (.250)	NR	12.3	8.6
10	Auburn	Jack Meagher	2–8–0 (.200)	1–6–0 (.143)	NR	5.8	10.7
11	Sewanee	Harry E. Clark	2–7–0 (.222)	0–4–0 (.000)	NR	4.4	16.3
12	Mississippi State	Ross MacKechnie	4–6–0 (.400)	0–5–0 (.000)	NR	7.9	12.6
13	Georgia Tech	William Alexander	1–9–0 (.100)	0–6–0 (.000)	NR	5.6	18.7

Key
DS final = Rankings from the Dickinson System. See 1934 college football rankings
PPG = Average of points scored per game
PAG = Average of points allowed per game

== Schedule ==
Index to colors and formatting
SEC member won
SEC member lost
SEC member tie
SEC teams in **bold**

=== Week Zero ===
Date	Visiting team	Home team	Site	Result	Attendance	Ref.
September 21	Birmingham–Southern	**Auburn**	Cramton Bowl • Montgomery, AL	**L** 0–7		
September 21	**Mississippi State**	Howard (AL)	Legion Field • Birmingham, AL	**W** 13–7		
September 22	Maryville (TN)	**Kentucky**	McLean Stadium • Lexington, KY	**W** 26–0		

=== Week One ===
Date	Visiting team	Home team	Site	Result	Attendance	Ref.
September 29	Chattanooga	**Tulane**	Tulane Stadium • New Orleans, LA	**W** 41–0	12,000	
September 29	Howard (AL)	**Alabama**	Denny Stadium • Tuscaloosa, AL	**W** 24–0	6,000	
September 29	Centre	**Tennessee**	Shields–Watkins Field • Knoxville, TN	**W** 32–0	7,500	
September 29	**LSU**	Rice	Rice Field • Houston, TX	**T** 9–9		
September 29	Stetson	**Georgia**	Sanford Stadium • Athens, GA	**W** 42–0	5,000	
September 29	Rollins	**Florida**	Fairfield Stadium • Jacksonville, FL	**W** 13–2	6,000	
September 29	West Tennessee State Teachers	**Ole Miss**	Hemingway Stadium • University, MS (rivalry)	**W** 44–0		
September 29	Washington & Lee	**Kentucky**	McLean Stadium • Lexington, KY	**L** 0–7	6,000	
September 29	Oglethorpe	**Auburn**	Drake Field • Auburn, AL	**W** 15–0	5,000	
September 29	**Sewanee**	Southwestern (TN)	Fargason Field • Memphis, TN (rivalry)	**L** 0–2		
September 29	Clemson	**Georgia Tech**	Grant Field • Atlanta, GA (rivalry)	**W** 12–7		
September 29	**Mississippi State**	**Vanderbilt**	Dudley Field • Nashville, TN	**VAN** 7–0		

=== Week Two ===
Date	Visiting team	Home team	Site	Result	Attendance	Ref.
October 5	Millsaps	**Mississippi State**	Scott Field • Starkville, MS	**L** 6–7		
October 5	Southwestern (TN)	**Ole Miss**	Soldiers' Field • Clarksdale, MS	**W** 19–0	6,200	
October 5	**Tennessee**	North Carolina	Kenan Memorial Stadium • Chapel Hill, NC	**W** 19–7		
October 6	**Georgia**	Furman	Manly Field • Greenville, SC	**W** 7–2		
October 6	**Florida**	VPI	Miles Stadium • Blacksburg, VA	**W** 20–13		
October 6	**Kentucky**	Cincinnati	Nippert Stadium • Cincinnati, OH	**W** 27–0		
October 6	SMU	**LSU**	Tiger Stadium • Baton Rouge, LA	**T** 14–14		
October 6	**Auburn**	**Tulane**	Tulane Stadium • New Orleans, LA (rivalry)	**TUL** 13–0		
October 6	**Sewanee**	**Alabama**	Cramton Bowl • Montgomery, AL	**ALA** 36–6		
October 6	**Vanderbilt**	**Georgia Tech**	Grant Field • Atlanta, GA (rivalry)	**VAN** 27–12	10,000	

=== Week Three ===
Date	Visiting team	Home team	Site	Result	Attendance	Ref.
October 13	North Carolina	**Georgia**	Sanford Stadium • Athens, GA	**L** 0–14	10,000	
October 13	Clemson	**Kentucky**	McLean Stadium • Lexington, KY	**W** 7–0		
October 13	Tennessee Wesleyan	**Sewanee**	Hardee Field • Sewanee, TN	**W** 21–0		
October 13	**Vanderbilt**	Cincinnati	Nippert Stadium • Cincinnati, OH	**W** 32–0	8,000	
October 13	**Georgia Tech**	Duke	Duke Stadium • Durham, NC	**L** 0–20	30,000	
October 13	**Mississippi State**	**Alabama**	Denny Stadium • Tuscaloosa, AL (rivalry)	**ALA** 41–0	6,000	
October 13	**Ole Miss**	**Tennessee**	Shields–Watkins Field • Knoxville, TN (rivalry)	**UT** 27–0	10,000	
October 13†	**Auburn**	**LSU**	Tiger Stadium • Baton Rouge, LA (rivalry)	**LSU** 20–6		
October 13	**Tulane**	**Florida**	Florida Field • Gainesville, FL	**TUL** 28–12	15,000	

=== Week Four ===
Date	Visiting team	Home team	Site	Result	Attendance	Ref.
October 20	NC State	**Florida**	Plant Field • Tampa, FL	**W** 14–0	12,000	
October 20	**Kentucky**	North Carolina	Kenan Memorial Stadium • Chapel Hill, NC	**L** 0–6		
October 20	**Sewanee**	Army	Michie Stadium • West Point, NY	**L** 0–20		
October 20	**Mississippi State**	Southwestern (TN)	Fargason Field • Memphis, TN	**W** 21–6	4,000	
October 20	**Georgia Tech**	Michigan	Michigan Stadium • Ann Arbor, MI	**L** 2–9	20,901	
October 20	Howard (AL)	**Ole Miss**	Hemingway Stadium • University, MS	**L** 6–7		
October 20	Arkansas	**LSU**	State Fair Stadium • Shreveport, LA (rivalry)	**W** 16–0	12,000	
October 20	**Georgia**	**Tulane**	Tulane Stadium • New Orleans, LA	**TUL** 7–6	23,000	
October 20	**Tennessee**	**Alabama**	Legion Field • Birmingham, AL (rivalry)	**ALA** 13–6	18,000	
October 20	**Auburn**	**Vanderbilt**	Dudley Field • Nashville, TN	**VAN** 7–6		

=== Week Five ===
Date	Visiting team	Home team	Site	Result	Attendance	Ref.
October 26	Mississippi College	**Mississippi State**	Scott Field • Starkville, MS	**W** 13–6		
October 27	**Florida**	Maryland	Municipal Stadium • Baltimore, MD	**L** 0–21	8,000	
October 27	Duke	**Tennessee**	Shields–Watkins Field • Knoxville, TN	**W** 14–6	20,000	
October 27	**Georgia Tech**	**Tulane**	Tulane Stadium • New Orleans, LA	**TUL** 20–12	12,000	
October 27	**Georgia**	**Alabama**	Legion Field • Birmingham, AL (rivalry)	**ALA** 26–6	15,000	
October 27	**LSU**	**Vanderbilt**	Dudley Field • Nashville, TN	**LSU** 29–0	20,000	
October 27	**Sewanee**	**Ole Miss**	Hemingway Stadium • University, MS	**OM** 19–6		
October 27	**Auburn**	**Kentucky**	McLean Stadium • Lexington, KY	**KY** 9–0	8,000	

=== Week Six ===
Date	Visiting team	Home team	Site	Result	Attendance	Ref.
November 3	North Carolina	**Georgia Tech**	Grant Field • Atlanta, GA	**L** 0–26		
November 3	Tennessee Tech	**Sewanee**	Hardee Field • Sewanee, TN	**W** 7–6		
November 3	Duke	**Auburn**	Legion Field • Birmingham, AL	**L** 6–13		
November 3	**Vanderbilt**	George Washington	Griffith Stadium • Washington, DC	**W** 7–6	25,000	
November 3	**Tennessee**	Fordham	Polo Grounds • New York, NY	**L** 12–13	25,000	
November 3	**Ole Miss**	**Tulane**	Tulane Stadium • New Orleans, LA (rivalry)	**TUL** 15–0		
November 3	**Alabama**	**Kentucky**	McLean Stadium • Lexington, KY	**ALA** 34–14	13,000	
November 3	**Mississippi State**	**LSU**	Tiger Stadium • Baton Rouge, LA (rivalry)	**LSU** 25–3		
November 3	**Georgia**	**Florida**	Fairfield Stadium • Jacksonville, FL (rivalry)	**UGA** 14–0	22,000	

=== Week Seven ===
Date	Visiting team	Home team	Site	Result	Attendance	Ref.
November 10	**Kentucky**	Southwestern (TN)	Fargason Field • Memphis, TN	**W** 33–0	2,000–3,000	
November 10	**Georgia**	Yale	Yale Bowl • New Haven, CT	**W** 14–7	20,000	
November 10	**LSU**	George Washington	Griffith Stadium • Washington, DC	**W** 6–0	20,000	
November 10	**Tulane**	Colgate	Yankee Stadium • Bronx, NY	**L** 6–20	40,000	
November 10	Clemson	**Alabama**	Denny Stadium • Tuscaloosa, AL (rivalry)	**W** 40–0	8,000	
November 10	**Mississippi State**	**Tennessee**	Shields–Watkins Field • Knoxville, TN	**TEN** 14–0	5,000	
November 10	**Sewanee**	**Vanderbilt**	Dudley Field • Nashville, TN (rivalry)	**VAN** 19–0		
November 10	**Ole Miss**	**Florida**	Florida Field • Gainesville, FL	**T** 13–13		
November 10	**Auburn**	**Georgia Tech**	Grant Field • Atlanta, GA	**AUB** 18–6		

=== Week Eight ===
Date	Visiting team	Home team	Site	Result	Attendance	Ref.
November 16	Cumberland (TN)	**Sewanee**	Hardee Field • Sewanee, TN	**L** 0–14		
November 17	**Mississippi State**	Loyola (LA)	Loyola University Stadium • New Orleans, LA	**W** 20–6		
November 17†	NC State	**Georgia**	Sanford Stadium • Athens, GA	**W** 27–0	8,000	
November 17	**Tulane**	**Kentucky**	McLean Stadium • Lexington, KY	**TUL** 20–7	12,000	
November 17	**Alabama**	**Georgia Tech**	Grant Field • Atlanta, GA (rivalry)	**ALA** 40–0	14,000	
November 17	**Tennessee**	**Vanderbilt**	Dudley Field • Nashville, TN (rivalry)	**TEN** 13–6	20,000	
November 17	**LSU**	**Ole Miss**	Municipal Stadium • Jackson, MS (rivalry)	**LSU** 14–0	10,000	
November 17	**Florida**	**Auburn**	Cramton Bowl • Montgomery, AL (rivalry)	**FLA** 14–7	8,000	

=== Week Nine ===
Date	Visiting team	Home team	Site	Result	Attendance	Ref.
November 24	**Ole Miss**	Centenary	Centenary Stadium • Shreveport, LA	**L** 6–13	7,500	
November 24	**Sewanee**	**Tulane**	Tulane Stadium • New Orleans, LA	**TUL** 32–0		
November 24	**Auburn**	**Georgia**	Memorial Stadium • Columbus, GA (rivalry)	**UGA** 18–0		
November 24	**Georgia Tech**	**Florida**	Florida Field • Gainesville, FL	**FLA** 13–12		

=== Week Nine ===
Date	Visiting team	Home team	Site	Result	Attendance	Ref.
November 29	**Vanderbilt**	Alabama	Legion Field • Birmingham, AL	**ALA** 34–0	24,000	
November 29	**Kentucky**	Tennessee	Shields–Watkins Field • Knoxville, TN (rivalry)	**TEN** 19–0	18,000	
December 1	Stetson	Florida	Florida Field • Gainesville, FL	**W** 14–0		
December 1	**Tulane**	LSU	Tiger Stadium • Baton Rouge, LA (rivalry)	**TUL** 13–12	30,000	
December 1	**Georgia Tech**	Georgia	Sanford Stadium • Athens, GA (rivalry)	**UGA** 7–0	14,000	
December 1	**Ole Miss**	Mississippi State	Municipal Stadium • Jackson, MS (rivalry)	**OM** 7–3	10,000	

=== Week Ten ===
Date	Visiting team	Home team	Site	Result	Attendance	Ref.
December 8	**LSU**	**Tennessee**	Shields–Watkins Field • Knoxville, TN	**TEN** 19–13	18,000	

=== Week Eleven ===
Date	Visiting team	Home team	Site	Result	Attendance	Ref.
December 15	Oregon	**LSU**	Tiger Stadium • Baton Rouge, LA	**W** 14–13	10,000	

=== Postseason ===
Date	Visiting team	Home team	Site	Result	Attendance	Ref.
January 1, 1935	Temple	**Tulane**	Tulane Stadium • New Orleans, LA (Sugar Bowl)	**W** 20–14	22,206	
January 1, 1935	Stanford	**Alabama**	Rose Bowl • Pasadena, CA (Rose Bowl)	**W** 29–13	84,474	

== All-conference players ==
The following players were recognized as consensus first-team honors from the Associated Press (AP) and United Press (UP) on the 1934 All-SEC football team:

- Don Hutson, End, Alabama (AP-1, UP-1)
- Bennie Fenton, End, Auburn (AP-1, UP-1)
- Justin Rukas, Tackle, LSU (AP-1, UP-1)
- Bill Lee, Tackle, Alabama (AP-1, UP-1)
- Charlie Marr, Guard, Alabama (AP-1, UP-1)
- Homer Robinson, Center, Tulane (AP-1, UP-1)
- Abe Mickal, Halfback, LSU (College Football Hall of Fame) (AP-1, UP-1)
- Dixie Howell, Halfback, Alabama (College Football Hall of Fame) (AP-1, UP-1)
- Claude Simons, Jr., Fullback, Tulane (AP-1, UP-1)

== All-Americans ==
Three SEC players were consensus first-team picks on the 1934 College Football All-America Team:

- Dixie Howell, Halfback, Alabama (AAB, INS, LIB, NANA, NEA, UP)
- Don Hutson, End, Alabama (AAB, AP, INS, LIB, UP)
- Bill Lee, Tackle, Alabama (AP, COL, LIB, NANA, SN)

Other SEC players receiving All-American honors from at least one selector were:

- Claude Simons, Jr., Halfback, Tulane (AP-3)

== Head coaches ==
Records through the completion of the 1934 season

Team	Head coach	Years at school	Overall record	Record at school	SEC record
Alabama	Frank Thomas	4	60–13–3 (.809)	34–4–1 (.885)	12–0–1 (.962)
Auburn	Jack Meagher	1	28–34–0 (.452)	2–8–0 (.200)	1–6–0 (.143)
Florida	Dennis K. Stanley	2	11–6–2 (.632)	11–6–2 (.632)	4–5–1 (.450)
Georgia	Harry Mehre	7	42–23–3 (.640)	42–23–3 (.640)	6–3–0 (.667)
Georgia Tech	William Alexander	15	76–55–10 (.574)	76–55–10 (.574)	2–11–0 (.154)
Kentucky	Chet A. Wynne	1	66–46–9 (.583)	5–5–0 (.500)	1–3–0 (.250)
LSU	Biff Jones	3	50–13–8 (.761)	20–5–6 (.742)	7–2–2 (.727)
Mississippi State	Ross MacKechnie	2	7–12–1 (.375)	7–12–1 (.375)	1–10–1 (.125)
Ole Miss	Ed Walker	5	20–25–5 (.450)	20–25–5 (.450)	4–5–2 (.455)
Sewanee	Harry E. Clark	4	13–23–2 (.368)	13–23–2 (.368)	0–10–0 (.000)
Tennessee	Robert Neyland	9	76–9–5 (.872)	76–9–5 (.872)	10–3–0 (.769)
Tulane	Ted Cox	3	33–7–3 (.802)	22–6–2 (.767)	12–2–1 (.833)
Vanderbilt	Dan McGugin	30	197–55–19 (.762)	197–55–19 (.762)	6–5–2 (.538)
