= 1934 Ole Miss Rebels football team =

American college football season

1934 Ole Miss Rebels football
- Conference: Southeastern Conference
- Record: 4–5–1 (2–3–1 SEC)
- Head coach: Ed Walker (5th season)
- Home stadium: Hemingway Stadium

1934 Southeastern Conference football standings
	Conf.					Overall
Team		W		L			W		L
No. 11 Tulane +	8	–	0	–	0	10	–	1	–	0
No. 6 Alabama +	7	–	0	–	0	10	–	0	–	0
Tennessee	5	–	1	–	0	8	–	2	–	0
LSU	4	–	2	–	0	7	–	2	–	2
Georgia	3	–	2	–	0	7	–	3	–	0
Vanderbilt	4	–	3	–	0	6	–	3	–	0
Florida	2	–	2	–	1	6	–	3	–	1
Ole Miss	2	–	3	–	1	4	–	5	–	1
Kentucky	1	–	3	–	0	5	–	5	–	0
Auburn	1	–	6	–	0	2	–	8	–	0
Sewanee	0	–	4	–	0	2	–	7	–	0
Mississippi State	0	–	5	–	0	4	–	6	–	0
Georgia Tech	0	–	6	–	0	1	–	9	–	0
+ – Conference co-champions; Rankings from Dickinson System

The 1934 Ole Miss Rebels football team was an American football team that represented the University of Mississippi (Ole Miss) as a member of the Southeastern Conference (SEC) during the 1934 college football season. In their fifth year under head coach Ed Walker, the Rebels compiled an overall record of 4–5–1, with a conference record of 2–3–1, and finished seventh in the SEC.

== Schedule ==
Date	Time	Opponent	Site	Result	Attendance	Source
September 29	2:30 p.m.	West Tennessee State Teachers*	Hemingway Stadium; University, MS (rivalry)	W 44–0		
October 5		vs. Southwestern (TN)*	Soldiers' Field; Clarksdale, MS	W 19–0	6,200	
October 13		at Tennessee	Shields–Watkins Field; Knoxville, TN (rivalry)	L 0–27	10,000	
October 20		Howard (AL)*	Hemingway Stadium; University, MS	L 6–7		
October 27		Sewanee	Hemingway Stadium; University, MS	W 19–6		
November 3		at Tulane	Tulane Stadium; New Orleans, LA (rivalry)	L 0–15		
November 10		at Florida	Florida Field; Gainesville, FL	T 13–13		
November 17		LSU	Municipal Stadium; Jackson, MS (rivalry)	L 0–14	10,000	
November 24		at Centenary*	Centenary Stadium; Shreveport, LA	L 6–13	7,500	
December 1		vs. Mississippi State	Municipal Stadium; Jackson, MS (Egg Bowl)	W 7–3	10,000	
*Non-conference game; All times are in Central time
