= 1934 Tulane Green Wave football team =

American college football season

1934 Tulane Green Wave football

SEC co-champion Sugar Bowl champion

Sugar Bowl, W 20–14 vs. Temple
- Conference: Southeastern Conference
- Record: 10–1 (8–0 SEC)
- Head coach: Ted Cox (3rd season)
- Captain: Joe Lofton
- Home stadium: Tulane Stadium

1934 Southeastern Conference football standings
	Conf.					Overall
Team		W		L			W		L
No. 11 Tulane +	8	–	0	–	0	10	–	1	–	0
No. 6 Alabama +	7	–	0	–	0	10	–	0	–	0
Tennessee	5	–	1	–	0	8	–	2	–	0
LSU	4	–	2	–	0	7	–	2	–	2
Georgia	3	–	2	–	0	7	–	3	–	0
Vanderbilt	4	–	3	–	0	6	–	3	–	0
Florida	2	–	2	–	1	6	–	3	–	1
Ole Miss	2	–	3	–	1	4	–	5	–	1
Kentucky	1	–	3	–	0	5	–	5	–	0
Auburn	1	–	6	–	0	2	–	8	–	0
Sewanee	0	–	4	–	0	2	–	7	–	0
Mississippi State	0	–	5	–	0	4	–	6	–	0
Georgia Tech	0	–	6	–	0	1	–	9	–	0
+ – Conference co-champions; Rankings from Dickinson System

The 1934 Tulane Green Wave football team was an American football team that represented Tulane University as a member of the Southeastern Conference (SEC) during the 1934 college football season. In its third year head coach Ted Cox, the Green Wave compiled a 10–1 record (8–0 in conference games, tied with Alabama for the SEC championship, and outscored opponents by a total of 215 to 83. Tulane was ranked No. 11 in the final Dickinson rankings issued in December 1934.

Tulane was invited to play in the first Sugar Bowl, held at Tulane Stadium, where the Green Wave defeated previously unbeaten Temple, 20–14, on New Year's Day.

Fullback Claude Simons Jr. and center Homer Robinson received first-team honors from the Associated Press and United Press on the 1934 All-SEC football team.

Tulane played its home games at Tulane Stadium in New Orleans.

== Schedule ==
Date	Opponent	Site	Result	Attendance	Source
September 29	Chattanooga*	Tulane Stadium; New Orleans, LA	W 41–0	12,000	
October 6	Auburn	Tulane Stadium; New Orleans, LA (rivalry)	W 13–0		
October 13	at Florida	Florida Field; Gainesville, FL	W 28–12	15,000	
October 20	Georgia	Tulane Stadium; New Orleans, LA	W 7–6	23,000	
October 27	Georgia Tech	Tulane Stadium; New Orleans, LA	W 20–12	12,000	
November 3	Ole Miss	Tulane Stadium; New Orleans, LA (rivalry)	W 15–0		
November 10	vs. Colgate*	Yankee Stadium; Bronx, NY	L 6–20	40,000	
November 17	at Kentucky	McLean Stadium; Lexington, KY	W 20–7	12,000	
November 24	Sewanee	Tulane Stadium; New Orleans, LA	W 32–0		
December 1	at LSU	Tiger Stadium; Baton Rouge, LA (Battle for the Rag)	W 13–12	30,000	
January 1, 1935	vs. Temple*	Tulane Stadium; New Orleans, LA (Sugar Bowl)	W 20–14	22,206	
*Non-conference game
