= 1934 Georgia Tech Yellow Jackets football team =

American college football season

1934 Georgia Tech Yellow Jackets football
- Conference: Southeastern Conference
- Record: 1–9 (0–6 SEC)
- Head coach: William Alexander (15th season)
- Offensive scheme: Double wing
- Captain: Jack Phillips
- Home stadium: Grant Field

1934 Southeastern Conference football standings
	Conf.					Overall
Team		W		L			W		L
No. 11 Tulane +	8	–	0	–	0	10	–	1	–	0
No. 6 Alabama +	7	–	0	–	0	10	–	0	–	0
Tennessee	5	–	1	–	0	8	–	2	–	0
LSU	4	–	2	–	0	7	–	2	–	2
Georgia	3	–	2	–	0	7	–	3	–	0
Vanderbilt	4	–	3	–	0	6	–	3	–	0
Florida	2	–	2	–	1	6	–	3	–	1
Ole Miss	2	–	3	–	1	4	–	5	–	1
Kentucky	1	–	3	–	0	5	–	5	–	0
Auburn	1	–	6	–	0	2	–	8	–	0
Sewanee	0	–	4	–	0	2	–	7	–	0
Mississippi State	0	–	5	–	0	4	–	6	–	0
Georgia Tech	0	–	6	–	0	1	–	9	–	0
+ – Conference co-champions; Rankings from Dickinson System

The 1934 Georgia Tech Yellow Jackets football team was an American football team that represented Georgia Tech as a member of the Southeastern Conference (SEC) during the 1934 college football season. In their 15th year under head coach William Alexander, the Yellow Jackets compiled an overall record of 1–9, with a conference record of 0–6, and finished 13th in the SEC.

== Schedule ==
Date	Opponent	Site	Result	Attendance	Source
September 29	Clemson*	Grant Field; Atlanta, GA (rivalry)	W 12–7		
October 6	Vanderbilt	Grant Field; Atlanta, GA (rivalry)	L 12–27	10,000	
October 13	at Duke*	Duke Stadium; Durham, NC	L 0–20	30,000	
October 20	at Michigan*	Michigan Stadium; Ann Arbor, MI	L 2–9	20,901	
October 27	at Tulane	Tulane Stadium; New Orleans, LA	L 12–20	12,000	
November 3	North Carolina*	Grant Field; Atlanta, GA	L 0–26		
November 10	Auburn	Grant Field; Atlanta, GA (rivalry)	L 6–18		
November 17	Alabama	Grant Field; Atlanta, GA (rivalry)	L 0–40	14,000	
November 24	at Florida	Florida Field; Gainesville, FL	L 12–13		
December 1	at Georgia	Sanford Stadium; Athens, GA (rivalry)	L 0–7	14,000	
*Non-conference game
