= 1934 Alabama Crimson Tide football team =

American college football season

1934 Alabama Crimson Tide football

National champion (five selectors) Rose Bowl champion SEC co-champion

Rose Bowl, W 29–13 vs. Stanford
- Conference: Southeastern Conference
- Record: 10–0 (7–0 SEC)
- Head coach: Frank Thomas (4th season)
- Captain: Bill Lee
- Home stadium: Denny Stadium; Legion Field; Cramton Bowl

1934 Southeastern Conference football standings
| | Conf. | | | | | Overall |
| Team | | W | | L | | | W | | L |
|---|---|---|---|---|---|---|---|---|---|---|
| No. 11 Tulane + | 8 | – | 0 | – | 0 | 10 | – | 1 | – | 0 |
| No. 6 Alabama + | 7 | – | 0 | – | 0 | 10 | – | 0 | – | 0 |
| Tennessee | 5 | – | 1 | – | 0 | 8 | – | 2 | – | 0 |
| LSU | 4 | – | 2 | – | 0 | 7 | – | 2 | – | 2 |
| Georgia | 3 | – | 2 | – | 0 | 7 | – | 3 | – | 0 |
| Vanderbilt | 4 | – | 3 | – | 0 | 6 | – | 3 | – | 0 |
| Florida | 2 | – | 2 | – | 1 | 6 | – | 3 | – | 1 |
| Ole Miss | 2 | – | 3 | – | 1 | 4 | – | 5 | – | 1 |
| Kentucky | 1 | – | 3 | – | 0 | 5 | – | 5 | – | 0 |
| Auburn | 1 | – | 6 | – | 0 | 2 | – | 8 | – | 0 |
| Sewanee | 0 | – | 4 | – | 0 | 2 | – | 7 | – | 0 |
| Mississippi State | 0 | – | 5 | – | 0 | 4 | – | 6 | – | 0 |
| Georgia Tech | 0 | – | 6 | – | 0 | 1 | – | 9 | – | 0 |
+ – Conference co-champions; Rankings from Dickinson System

The 1934 Alabama Crimson Tide football team (variously "Alabama", "UA" or "Bama") represented the University of Alabama in the 1934 college football season. It was the Crimson Tide's 41st overall season and 2nd as a member of the Southeastern Conference (SEC). The team was led by head coach Frank Thomas, in his fourth year, and played their home games at Denny Stadium in Tuscaloosa, Legion Field in Birmingham and the Cramton Bowl in Montgomery, Alabama. They finished the season with a perfect record (10–0 overall, 7–0 in the SEC), as Southeastern Conference champions for the second consecutive season and defeated Stanford in the Rose Bowl.

Five of the 13 selectors recognized as "major" by the NCAA (Berryman, Dunkel, Houlgate, Poling, and Williamson – all math systems) recognize the 1934 Alabama team as the national champion. Sportswriter Morgan Blake called it the best football team he ever saw.

== Schedule ==
| Date | Opponent | Site | Result | Attendance | Source |
|---|---|---|---|---|---|
| September 29 | Howard (AL)* | Denny Stadium; Tuscaloosa, AL | W 24–0 | 6,000 | |
| October 6 | Sewanee | Cramton Bowl; Montgomery, AL | W 35–6 | | |
| October 13 | Mississippi State | Denny Stadium; Tuscaloosa, AL (rivalry) | W 41–0 | 6,000 | |
| October 20 | Tennessee | Legion Field; Birmingham, AL (rivalry) | W 13–6 | 18,000 | |
| October 27 | Georgia | Legion Field; Birmingham, AL (rivalry) | W 26–6 | 15,000 | |
| November 3 | at Kentucky | McLean Stadium; Lexington, KY | W 34–14 | 13,000 | |
| November 10 | Clemson*^{†} | Denny Stadium; Tuscaloosa, AL (rivalry) | W 40–0 | 8,000 | |
| November 17 | at Georgia Tech | Grant Field; Atlanta, GA (rivalry) | W 40–0 | 14,000 | |
| November 29 | Vanderbilt | Legion Field; Birmingham, AL | W 34–0 | 24,000 | |
| January 1, 1935 | vs. Stanford* | Rose Bowl; Pasadena, CA (Rose Bowl) | W 29–13 | 84,474 | |
*Non-conference game; ^{†}Homecoming

== Game summaries ==
=== Howard (AL) ===
| Team | 1 | 2 | 3 | 4 | Total |
|---|---|---|---|---|---|
| Howard | 0 | 0 | 0 | 0 | 0 |
| • Alabama | 6 | 6 | 6 | 6 | 24 |

- Date: September 29
- Location: Denny Stadium
  Tuscaloosa, Alabama
- Game attendance: 6,000

To open the 1934 season, Alabama scored touchdowns in all four quarters and defeated Howard College (now Samford University) 24–0 at Denny Stadium. Dixie Howell scored in the first on a two-yard run and Joe Riley scored in the second on a three-yard run to give the Crimson Tide a 12–0 halftime lead. Joe Demyanovich then scored both second half touchdowns with his seven-yard run in the third and one-yard run in the fourth for the 24–0 victory. The Howard squad was led by former Alabama player and assistant coach Clyde "Shorty" Propst in his first game against his alma mater.

=== Sewanee ===
| Team | 1 | 2 | 3 | 4 | Total |
|---|---|---|---|---|---|
| Sewanee | 0 | 6 | 0 | 0 | 6 |
| • Alabama | 14 | 0 | 14 | 7 | 35 |

- Date: October 6
- Location: Cramton Bowl
  Montgomery, Alabama

In June 1934, coach Thomas announced their game against Sewanee would be moved from Tuscaloosa to the Cramton Bowl in Montgomery. In what was their conference opener, Alabama defeated the Tigers, 35–6, at Montgomery. Alabama took a 14–0 lead in the first quarter after scoring touchdowns on successive possessions. Dixie Howell scored first with his short run on offense and James Angelich scored a defensive touchdown on the next series after he intercepted a Tigers pass and ran it back 23 yards for the score. Sewanee responded in the second quarter with an 87-yard Ruch interception return for a touchdown to cut the Alabama lead to 14–6 at the half. Alabama then closed the game with three unanswered touchdowns for the 35–6 victory. Touchdowns were scored by Howell on a 61-yard run and by Joe Demyanovich on a short run in the third, and on a 15-yard Young Boozer run in the fourth.

This game was originally scheduled to kick off at 8:00 pm on Friday, October 5, and it was to have been the first night game played by Alabama in their history. After a mutual agreement was reached between both head coaches, the game was postponed to the following afternoon as a result of a major rain event that made the playing surface at the Cramton Bowl unplayable. The Crimson Tide would not compete in their first night game for another six seasons when they defeated Spring Hill to open the 1940 season.

=== Mississippi State ===
| Team | 1 | 2 | 3 | 4 | Total |
|---|---|---|---|---|---|
| Mississippi State | 0 | 0 | 0 | 0 | 0 |
| • Alabama | 14 | 14 | 0 | 13 | 41 |

- Date: October 13
- Location: Denny Stadium
  Tuscaloosa, Alabama
- Game attendance: 6,000

Against their long-time rival, the Mississippi State Maroons, Alabama won 41–0 at Denny Stadium. The Crimson Tide scored two touchdowns in each of the first two quarters to take a commanding 28–0 lead at halftime. In the first, James Angelich scored on a 48-yard run and Riley Smith intercepted a Charles Armstrong pass and returned it 64-yards for a score. In the second, Bear Bryant scored on a reception and later on an 80-yard kickoff return for a touchdown by Young Boozer. After a scoreless third, the Crimson Tide scored a pair of fourth-quarter touchdowns on Boozer runs of 74 and 8-yards for the 41–0 win.

=== Tennessee ===
Third Saturday in October

| Team | 1 | 2 | 3 | 4 | Total |
|---|---|---|---|---|---|
| Tennessee | 0 | 6 | 0 | 0 | 6 |
| • Alabama | 0 | 6 | 7 | 0 | 13 |

- Date: October 20
- Location: Legion Field
  Birmingham, Alabama
- Game attendance: 18,000

Against rival Tennessee, Alabama defeated the Volunteers, 13–6 at Legion Field. After a scoreless first quarter that featured several defensive stops for each team, both scored second-quarter touchdowns to tie the game 6–6 at the half. Joe Demyanovich scored for Alabama first on an eight-yard run and then Tennessee tied the game on a two-yard George Craig run. During the Volunteers scoring drive, Bear Bryant was ejected from the game due to an unsportsmanlike conduct penalty. In the third, Don Hutson scored the game-winning touchdown on an end-around run.

=== Georgia ===
| Team | 1 | 2 | 3 | 4 | Total |
|---|---|---|---|---|---|
| Georgia | 0 | 0 | 0 | 6 | 6 |
| • Alabama | 6 | 7 | 13 | 0 | 26 |

- Date: October 27
- Location: Legion Field
  Birmingham, Alabama
- Game attendance: 15,000

Against Georgia, Alabama outgained the Bulldogs 427 to 119 yards in total offense in their 26–6 victory at Legion Field. Dixie Howell scored first for the Crimson Tide with his touchdown run on Alabama's third offensive play of the game. Howell then scored in the second quarter on a three-yard touchdown run to give the Crimson Tide a 13–0 halftime lead. Alabama further extended their lead to 26–0 in the third quarter on a 38-yard James Angelich and two-yard Joe Demyanovich touchdown run. However, the defense was unable to complete the shutout as Maurice Greene scored for the Bulldogs on a seven-yard run in the fourth to make the final score 26–6.

=== Kentucky ===
| Team | 1 | 2 | 3 | 4 | Total |
|---|---|---|---|---|---|
| • Alabama | 14 | 7 | 0 | 13 | 34 |
| Kentucky | 0 | 0 | 7 | 7 | 14 |

- Date: November 3
- Location: McLean Stadium
  Lexington, Kentucky
- Game attendance: 13,000

In what was their first road game of the season, Alabama defeated the Kentucky Wildcats 34–14 on homecoming at McLean Stadium. Don Hutson scored the first touchdown with his 10-yard run and was followed with a three-yard Tilden Campbell touchdown run to give Alabama a 14–0 lead at the end of the first. Joe Riley then scored on a 16-yard run in the second to give the Crimson Tide a 21–0 halftime lead. Kentucky cut the lead to 21–7 in the third when Bert Johnson scored on a four-yard run. Both teams then traded fourth-quarter touchdowns to make the final score 34–14. Alabama scored first on an 11-yard Bear Bryant run, next was Johnson for the Wildcats with his 69-yard run and then Joe Riley threw a 38-yard pass to Young Boozer for the final score of the afternoon.

=== Clemson ===
| Team | 1 | 2 | 3 | 4 | Total |
|---|---|---|---|---|---|
| Clemson | 0 | 0 | 0 | 0 | 0 |
| • Alabama | 7 | 7 | 6 | 20 | 40 |

- Date: November 10
- Location: Denny Stadium
  Tuscaloosa, Alabama
- Game attendance: 8,000

On homecoming at Denny Stadium, Alabama defeated the Clemson Tigers of the Southern Conference 40–0 in Tuscaloosa. In the game, Alabama scored a touchdown in each of the first three quarters before doubling the score with three fourth-quarter touchdowns. Dixie Howell threw a three-yard touchdown pass to Don Hutson in the first quarter, Riley Smith scored in the second on a one-yard quarterback sneak and then Howell connected again with Hutson, this time from 26-yards, to give Alabama a 20–0 lead as they entered the fourth quarter. In the fourth, Young Boozer scored on a 27-yard run, Howell on an eight-yard run and Smith on an 18-yard run for the 40–0 win.

=== Georgia Tech ===
| Team | 1 | 2 | 3 | 4 | Total |
|---|---|---|---|---|---|
| • Alabama | 6 | 14 | 13 | 7 | 40 |
| Georgia Tech | 0 | 0 | 0 | 0 | 0 |

- Date: November 17
- Location: Grant Field
  Atlanta
- Game attendance: 14,000

Against the Georgia Tech, Alabama shutout the Yellow Jackets 40–0 at Grant Field. Joe Demyanovich started the scoring for Alabama in the first with his four-yard touchdown run. In the second, Dixie Howell scored a touchdown on 65-yard punt return and then he threw a 40-yard touchdown pass to Don Hutson to give the Crimson Tide a 20–0 halftime lead. After Riley Smith scored on a six-yard run and Howell on a five-yard run in the third, Joe Riley threw a 12-yard touchdown pass to Ralph Gandy in the fourth quarter and made the final score 40–0.

=== Vanderbilt ===
| Team | 1 | 2 | 3 | 4 | Total |
|---|---|---|---|---|---|
| Vanderbilt | 0 | 0 | 0 | 0 | 0 |
| • Alabama | 13 | 7 | 7 | 7 | 34 |

- Date: November 29
- Location: Legion Field
  Birmingham, Alabama
- Game attendance: 24,000

In the regular season finale on Thanksgiving Day, Alabama defeated the Vanderbilt Commodores 34–0 to capture their second consecutive SEC championship and secure a place in the Rose Bowl Game. James Angelich scored on a four-yard run and Dixie Howell on a 21-yard run to give the Crimson Tide a 13–0 lead at the end of the first quarter. Alabama then scored one touchdown in each of the final three quarters to make the final score 34–0. Alabama scored on a short run by Joe Demyanovich in the second, on a 70-yard Angelich interception return in the third and on a 15-yard Howell run in the fourth.

=== Stanford ===
Rose Bowl Game

| Team | 1 | 2 | 3 | 4 | Total |
|---|---|---|---|---|---|
| • Alabama | 0 | 22 | 0 | 7 | 29 |
| Stanford | 7 | 0 | 6 | 0 | 13 |

- Date: January 1, 1935
- Location: Rose Bowl
  Pasadena, California
- Game attendance: 84,474

Immediately after their victory over Vanderbilt in the season finale, University president George Denny accepted an invitation to play in the 1935 Rose Bowl against the Stanford Indians. In the game, which was a rematch of their draw in the 1927 Rose Bowl, the Crimson Tide overwhelmed the Indians with their 29–13 victory before 84,474 fans at Pasadena. The Stanford defense shined in the first quarter, as Alabama had only four yards total offense. The Indians then took a 7–0 lead later in the quarter after Bobby Grayson scored on a short run to complete a drive set up after Keith Topping recovered a Joe Demyanovich fumble. Early in the second, Dixie Howell scored on a five-yard run, but Riley Smith missed the extra point and Stanford still led 7–6.

After the Alabama touchdown, Stanford chose to kickoff rather than receive the ball after the score. On the resulting Alabama possession, the Crimson Tide took a 9–7 lead after Smith connected on a 27-yard field goal. For the second time, Stanford again chose to kickoff rather than receive the ball, and two plays later Howell scored on a 67-yard touchdown run and made the score 16–7. Then Alabama intercepted a Stanford pass, and took the ball at the 46-yard line with only eight seconds left. Joe Riley then threw a 46-yard touchdown pass to Don Hutson to put Alabama up 22–7 at halftime. Stanford scored in the third on a 12-yard Elzo Van Dellen touchdown run but could get no closer to the lead. Alabama finished the game with a 59-yard Howell to Hutson touchdown pass in the fourth and made final score 29–13.

== Awards ==
After the season, Alabama had three players selected by consensus to the 1934 College Football All-America Team. These players were:

- Don Hutson at end
- Dixie Howell at halfback
- Bill Lee at tackle

== National championship claim ==
The NCAA recognizes consensus national champions as the teams that have captured a championship by way of one of the major polls since the 1950 college football season. Prior to 1950, national championships were chosen by a variety of selectors, and in the 1980s, Alabama claimed the 1934 championship as one of its now 18 national championships. As such, Alabama claims a share of the 1934 national championship, with Minnesota, due to each school being selected national champion by various major selectors. Specifically, Alabama was selected national champion in 1934 by Dunkel, Houlgate, Poling System and Williamson.

== Personnel ==
=== Varsity letter winners ===
| Player | Hometown | Position |
|---|---|---|
| James Angelich | Indiana Harbor, Indiana | Halfback |
| Young Boozer | Dothan, Alabama | Halfback |
| Bear Bryant | Moro Bottom, Arkansas | End |
| Jeff Bush | Tuscaloosa, Alabama | Back |
| Tilden "Happy" Campbell | Pine Bluff, Arkansas | Quarterback |
| Joe Demyanovich | Bayonne, New Jersey | Fullback |
| Joe Dildy | Nashville, Arkansas | Center |
| Raiford Ellis | Birmingham, Alabama | Center |
| Kavanaugh Francis | Timson, Texas | Center |
| Ralph Gandy | Birmingham, Alabama | End |
| Dixie Howell | Hartford, Alabama | Halfback |
| Don Hutson | Pine Bluff, Arkansas | End |
| Bill Lee | Eutaw, Alabama | Tackle |
| Samuel Hamilton Lyon | Meridian, Mississippi | Tackle |
| Charlie Marr | Pine Bluff, Arkansas | Guard |
| T. A. "Son" McGahey | Columbus, Mississippi | Tackle |
| Ben McLeod | Leeksville, Mississippi | Halfback |
| Bob Ed Morrow | Selma, Alabama | Guard |
| Lamar Moyle | Decatur, Alabama | Center |
| James Nisbet | Bainbridge, Georgia | Fullback |
| Joe Riley | Dothan, Alabama | Halfback |
| Riley Smith | Columbus, Mississippi | Quarterback |
| Jim Whatley | Alexander City, Alabama | Tackle |
| Arthur "Tarzan" White | Atmore, Alabama | Guard |

=== Coaching staff ===
| Name | Position | Seasons at Alabama | Alma mater |
|---|---|---|---|
| Frank Thomas | Head coach | 4 | Notre Dame (1923) |
| Paul Burnum | Assistant coach | 5 | Alabama (1922) |
| Johnny Cain | Assistant coach | 1 | Alabama (1933) |
| Hank Crisp | Assistant coach | 14 | VPI (1920) |
| Harold Drew | Assistant coach | 4 | Bates (1916) |
| B'Ho Kirkland | Assistant coach | 1 | Alabama (1934) |
| Jennings B. Whitworth | Assistant coach | 3 | Alabama (1931) |
