= 1934 LSU Tigers football team =

American college football season

1934 LSU Tigers football
- Conference: Southeastern Conference
- Record: 7–2–2 (4–2 SEC)
- Head coach: Biff Jones (3rd season)
- Offensive scheme: Single-wing
- Home stadium: Tiger Stadium

1934 Southeastern Conference football standings
	Conf.					Overall
Team		W		L			W		L
No. 11 Tulane +	8	–	0	–	0	10	–	1	–	0
No. 6 Alabama +	7	–	0	–	0	10	–	0	–	0
Tennessee	5	–	1	–	0	8	–	2	–	0
LSU	4	–	2	–	0	7	–	2	–	2
Georgia	3	–	2	–	0	7	–	3	–	0
Vanderbilt	4	–	3	–	0	6	–	3	–	0
Florida	2	–	2	–	1	6	–	3	–	1
Ole Miss	2	–	3	–	1	4	–	5	–	1
Kentucky	1	–	3	–	0	5	–	5	–	0
Auburn	1	–	6	–	0	2	–	8	–	0
Sewanee	0	–	4	–	0	2	–	7	–	0
Mississippi State	0	–	5	–	0	4	–	6	–	0
Georgia Tech	0	–	6	–	0	1	–	9	–	0
+ – Conference co-champions; Rankings from Dickinson System

The 1934 LSU Tigers football team was an American football team that represented Louisiana State University (LSU) as a member of the Southeastern Conference (SEC) during the 1934 college football season. In their third year under head coach Biff Jones, the Tigers compiled an overall record of 7–2–2, with a conference record of 4–2, and finished fourth in the SEC.

== Schedule ==
Date	Opponent	Site	Result	Attendance	Source
September 29	at Rice*	Rice Field; Houston, TX	T 9–9		
October 6	SMU*	Tiger Stadium; Baton Rouge, LA	T 14–14		
October 13	Auburn^{†}	Tiger Stadium; Baton Rouge, LA (rivalry)	W 20–6		
October 20	vs. Arkansas*	State Fair Stadium; Shreveport, LA (rivalry)	W 16–0	12,000	
October 27	at Vanderbilt	Dudley Field; Nashville, TN	W 29–0	20,000	
November 3	Mississippi State	Tiger Stadium; Baton Rouge, LA (rivalry)	W 25–3		
November 10	at George Washington*	Griffith Stadium; Washington, DC	W 6–0	20,000	
November 17	at Ole Miss	Municipal Stadium; Jackson, MS (rivalry)	W 14–0	10,000	
December 1	Tulane	Tiger Stadium; Baton Rouge, LA (Battle for the Rag)	L 12–13	30,000	
December 8	at Tennessee	Shields–Watkins Field; Knoxville, TN	L 13–19	18,000	
December 15	Oregon*	Tiger Stadium; Baton Rouge, LA	W 14–13	10,000	
*Non-conference game; ^{†}Homecoming

== Huey Long incident ==
Throughout Lawrence "Biff" Jones' head coaching career at LSU, U.S. Senator Huey Long had reportedly interfered with his decision-making and recruiting. At halftime of LSU's 1934 final home game against Oregon, with the Tigers trailing 13–0, Long approached the team's locker room and demanded to speak with the team. Tired of Long's meddling with the team, Jones informed the Senator that he would quit after the game, "win, lose, or draw." The Tigers would come back and defeat the Ducks 14–13, and Jones would make good on his promise, leaving the program to coach the Oklahoma Sooners and later the Nebraska Cornhuskers. Bernie Moore, LSU's track and field coach, would take over the head football coach position. Moore had coached LSU to the NCAA track and field championship in 1933. Both Jones and Moore would wind up being elected to the College Football Hall of Fame.

== Bibliography ==
- Vincent, Herb (2008). LSU Football Vault: The History of the Fighting Tigers. Whitman Publishing, LLC. ISBN 978-0794824280.
