= Tulane Green Wave football =

Football team representing Tulane University

2026 Tulane Green Wave football team
- First season: 1893; 133 years ago
- Athletic director: David Harris
- Head coach: Will Hall; 1st season, 2–3 (.400)
- Location: New Orleans, Louisiana
- Stadium: Yulman Stadium (capacity: 30,000)
- NCAA division: Division I FBS
- Conference: American
- Colors: Olive green and sky blue
- All-time record: 585–681–38 (.463)
- CFP record: 0–1 (.000)
- Bowl record: 7–10 (.412)

National finalist
- Poll era: 1931

College Football Playoff appearances
- 2025

Conference championships
- SIAA: 1920 SoCon: 1925, 1929, 1930, 1931 SEC: 1934, 1939, 1949 C-USA: 1998 American: 2022, 2025

Division championships
- AAC West: 2018
- Consensus All-Americans: 5
- Rivalries: Southern Miss (rivalry); Ole Miss (rivalry); LSU (rivalry); Auburn (rivalry)

Uniforms
- Fight song: The Olive and the Blue
- Mascot: Riptide
- Marching band: Tulane University Marching Band
- Outfitter: Nike
- Website: TulaneGreenWave.com

The Tulane Green Wave football team represents Tulane University in the sport of American football. The Green Wave compete in the Football Bowl Subdivision (FBS) of the National Collegiate Athletic Association (NCAA) as a member of the American Conference (The American). The football team is currently coached by Will Hall, the team plays its home games in Yulman Stadium on its campus in Uptown New Orleans.

== Conference affiliations ==
Tulane has been both an independent and affiliated with multiple conferences.

- Independent (1893–1894)
- Southern Intercollegiate Athletic Association (1895–1921)
- Southern Conference (1922–1932)
- Southeastern Conference (1933–1965)
- Independent (1966–1995)
- Conference USA (1996–2013)
- American (2014–present)

== Championships ==
=== Conference championships ===
Tulane has won eleven conference football championships in five different conferences. As of 2025, Tulane's three Southeastern Conference titles are more than nine current members of the SEC: Arkansas, Kentucky, Mississippi State, Missouri, South Carolina, Texas A&M, Texas, Oklahoma and Vanderbilt.

Season	Conference	Coach	Overall Record	Conf. Record
1920^{†}	SIAA	Clark Shaughnessy	6–2–1	5–0
1925^{†}	SoCon	Clark Shaughnessy	9–0–1	5–0
1929	SoCon	Bernie Bierman	9–0	6–0
1930^{†}	SoCon	Bernie Bierman	8–1	5–0
1931	SoCon	Bernie Bierman	11–1	8–0
1934^{†}	SEC	Ted Cox	10–1	8–0
1939^{†}	SEC	Red Dawson	8–1–1	5–0
1949	SEC	Henry E. Frnka	7–2–1	5–1
1998	C-USA	Tommy Bowden	12–0	6–0
2022	American	Willie Fritz	12–2	7–1
2025	American	Jon Sumrall	11–2	7–1

† Co-championship

=== Division championships ===
Season	Division	Coach	Opponent	CG result
2018†	AAC West	Willie Fritz	N/A lost tiebreaker to Memphis	

† Co-championship

== Bowl games ==
Tulane has played in 17 official bowl games, with the Green Wave garnering a record of 7–10. Tulane also played in the Bacardi Bowl in 1909, playing the Havana Athletic Club, losing 11–0. This was not sanctioned by the NCAA, and thus the Green Wave do not recognize the bowl appearance. Notably, Tulane's first bowl win was the inaugural Sugar Bowl, played in their home stadium.

Season	Coach	Bowl	Opponent	Result
1931	Bernie Bierman	Rose Bowl	USC	L 12–21
1934	Ted Cox	Sugar Bowl	Temple	W 20–14
1939	Red Dawson	Sugar Bowl	Texas A&M	L 13–14
1970	Jim Pittman	Liberty Bowl	Colorado	W 17–3
1973	Bennie Ellender	Astro-Bluebonnet Bowl	Houston	L 7–47
1979	Larry Smith	Liberty Bowl	Penn State	L 6–9
1980	Vince Gibson	Hall of Fame Classic	Arkansas	L 15–34
1987	Mack Brown	Independence Bowl	Washington	L 12–24
1998	Chris Scelfo	Liberty Bowl	BYU	W 41–27
2002	Chris Scelfo	Hawaii Bowl	Hawaii	W 36–28
2013	Curtis Johnson	New Orleans Bowl	Louisiana–Lafayette	L 21–24
2018	Willie Fritz	Cure Bowl	Louisiana	W 41–24
2019	Willie Fritz	Armed Forces Bowl	Southern Miss	W 30–13
2020	Willie Fritz	Famous Idaho Potato Bowl	Nevada	L 27–38
2022	Willie Fritz	Cotton Bowl Classic †	USC	W 46–45
2023	Slade Nagle (Note: Nagle was named interim head coach for the team's bowl game following Willie Fritz's departure to Houston.)	Military Bowl	Virginia Tech	L 20–41
2024	Jon Sumrall	Gasparilla Bowl	Florida	L 8–33
2025	Jon Sumrall	CFP First Round †	Ole Miss	L 10–41

† New Year's Six/CFP game

== Head coaches ==
The team has had 39 head coaches and 1 interim head coach since Tulane began playing football in 1893. 13 coaches have led the program to postseason bowl games: R. R. Brown, Bernie Bierman, Ted Cox, Red Dawson, Jim Pittman, Bennie Ellender, Larry Smith, Vince Gibson, Mack Brown, Tommy Bowden, Chris Scelfo, Curtis Johnson, and Willie Fritz. While Tommy Bowden led the 1998 team to a perfect 11–0 regular season and the 1998 Liberty Bowl, Chris Scelfo coached the team during that game. Seven coaches have led the team to conference championships: Clark Shaughnessy (1 SIAA and 1 SoCon), Bernie Bierman (3 SoCon), Ted Cox (1 SEC), Red Dawson (1 SEC), Henry E. Frnka (1 SEC), Tommy Bowden (1 C-USA), and Willie Fritz (1 American).

Clark Shaughnessy and Chris Scelfo were at one time tied for all-time leaders in games coached at Tulane with 94 each until Willie Fritz surpassed them in 2023. Clark Shaughnessy is the all-time leader in years coached (11) and total wins (59). Presently, former head coach Willie Fritz, has the second-most program wins (43) of all time.

== Home stadium ==
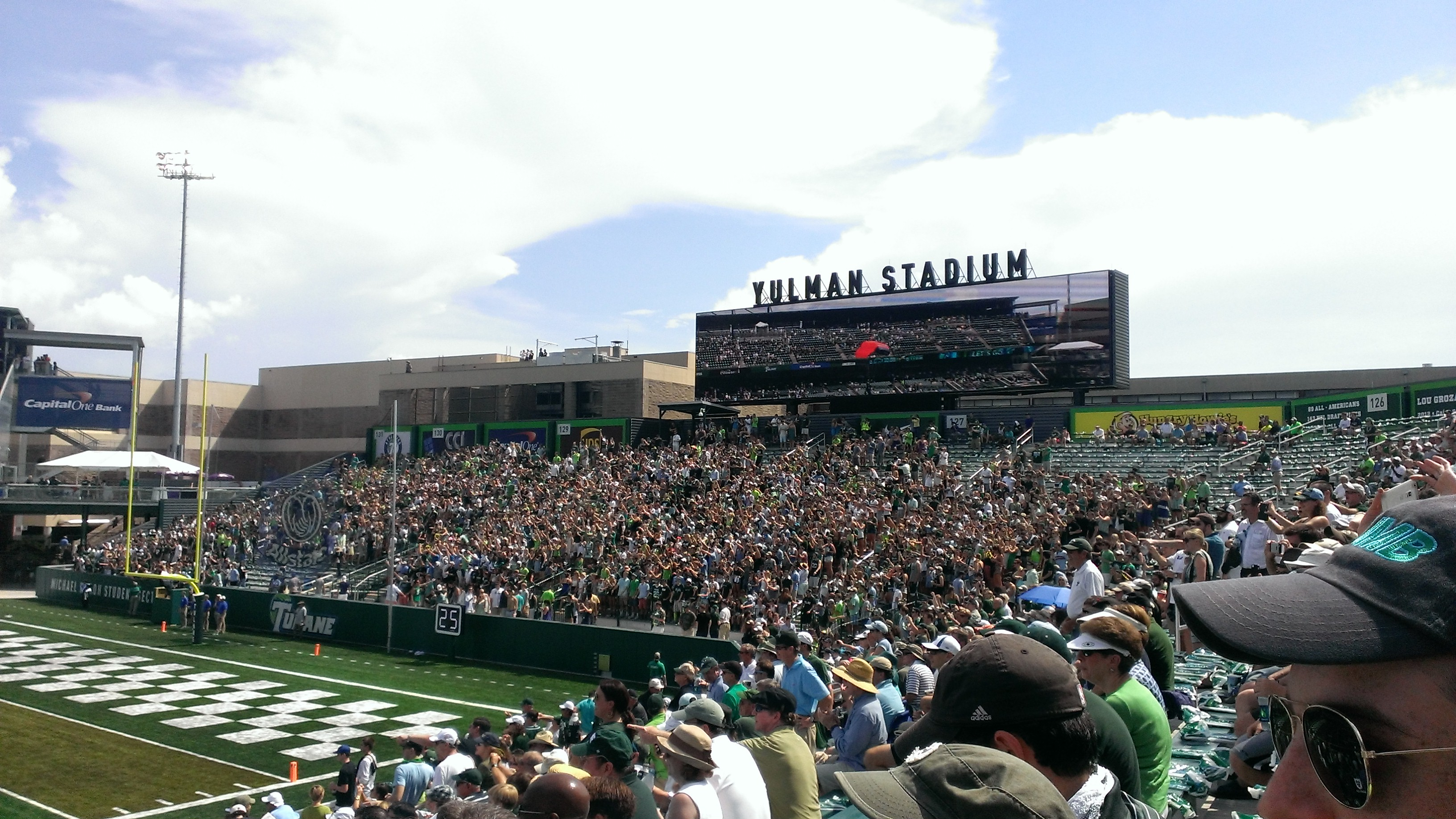
Yulman Stadium Student Section

The Green Wave have played their home games in Yulman Stadium on its Uptown campus since 2014. Prior to that season, Tulane played home games in the Caesars Superdome for nearly 40 seasons, and in its previous on-campus venue, the third Tulane Stadium, before that. The Green Wave have also played at the second Tulane Stadium, first Tulane Stadium, Athletic Park and Crescent City Base Ball Park.

Because Tulane's campus is landlocked within Uptown New Orleans, Yulman is tightly fit within its athletic footprint and directly abutting the surrounding neighborhood. The stadium has a capacity of 30,000 spectators and was constructed with the ability to expand.

== Rivalries ==
=== Auburn ===
Tulane leads the series with Auburn 17–15–6 through the 2019 season.

=== LSU ===
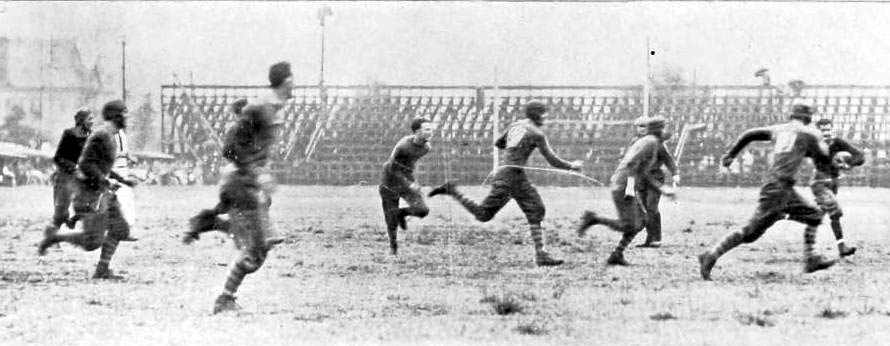
The 13th Battle for the Flag, a 0–0 tie in New Orleans on November 26, 1914.

Tulane's biggest and oldest rival is LSU. It began in 1893 with a 34–0 Green Wave victory over the Tigers. The teams stopped meeting every year in the Battle for the Rag in 2009. The rivalry became less competitive after 1948, until Tulane broke a 25-game non-winning streak in 1973 with a 14–0 victory in front of a Tulane Stadium record crowd of 86,598 in the final installment of the long-time rivalry played on Tulane's campus. Between 1979 and 1982, Tulane won three out of four games against the Tigers; the 1982 win was the last win to date. The two schools stopped playing annually after the 1994 game; however, they have met six times (1996, 2001, 2006, 2007, 2008, and 2009) since. As a condition of the broken series agreement made in 2006, a potential future game will be played in a future season in New Orleans. LSU leads the series 69–23–7 through the 2019 season.

=== Ole Miss ===
Ole Miss leads the series 45–28 through the 2025 season. The first game took place on December 2, 1893, in New Orleans, and the two schools have continued to play each other with few interruptions since. Tulane and Ole Miss spent much of their athletic histories as members of the same conference: the SIAA from 1899 to 1920, the Southern Conference from 1922 to 1932, and as charter members of the SEC from 1932 to 1966. As of 2025, Tulane hasn't defeated the Rebels since 1988.

In 2025, #13 Ole Miss defeated the Wave at home 45–10. Both schools would eventually rematch in the CFP First Round in Oxford, as #6 Ole Miss defeated #20 Tulane 41–10.

=== Southern Miss ===
Known as the Battle for the Bell, Tulane's rivalry with Southern Miss was played yearly from 1979 until 2006 and alternates sites between New Orleans and Hattiesburg, Mississippi. As a result of Conference USA splitting into East and West divisions in 2005, the game was played two out of every four years. The rivalry was put on hold as a result of Tulane's move to the American Conference in 2014, but in 2017 the schools announced new games slated for 2022, 2023, 2026, and 2027. Southern Miss leads the series 24–10 through the 2023 season.

== Culture ==
=== Marching band ===
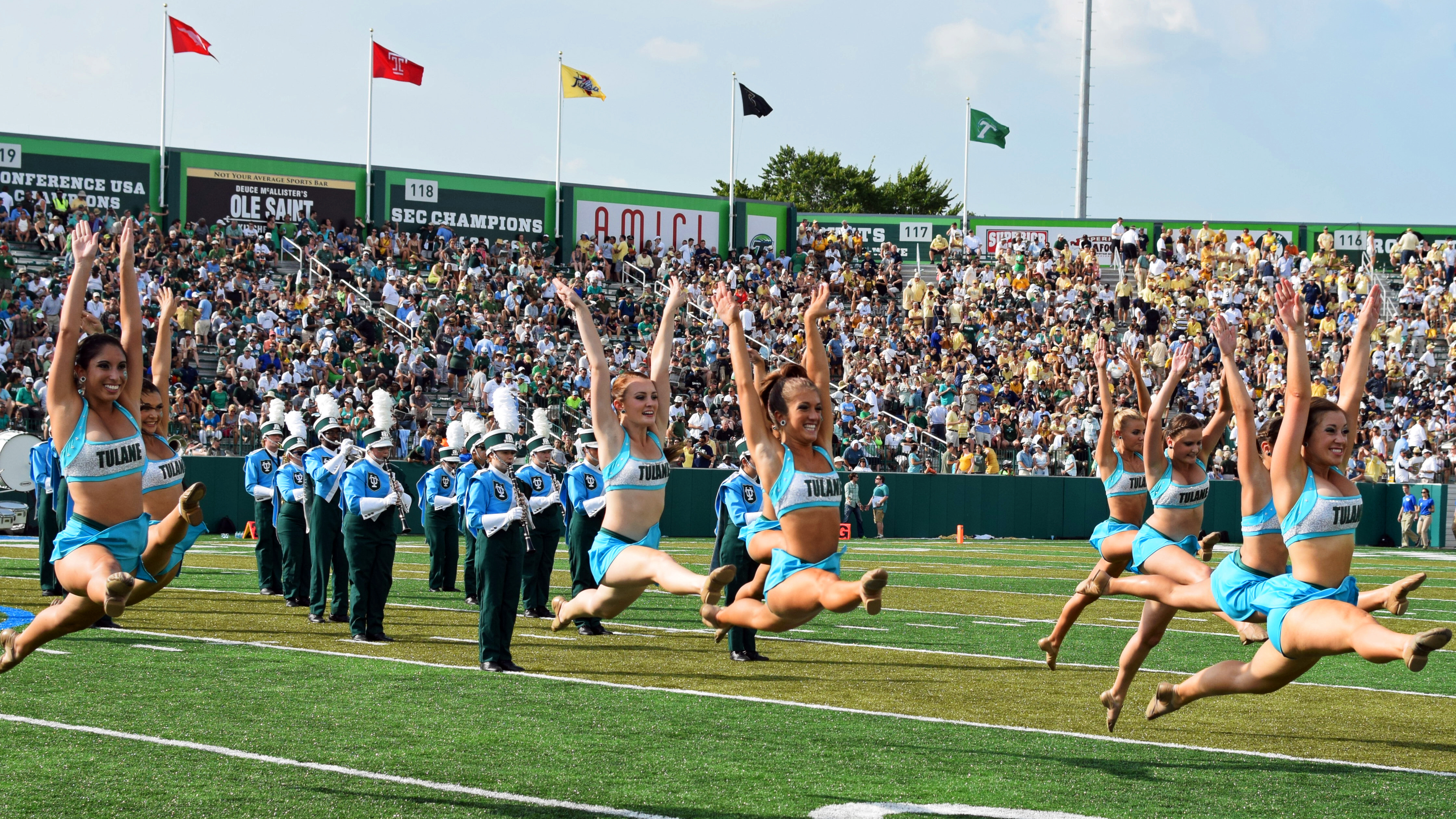
TUMB and Shockwave perform at halftime in Yulman Stadium

The Tulane University Marching Band (TUMB) was founded in 1920 as a military band. It dissolved shortly after the team's move to the Superdome in the 1970s and did not formally return until 2006. The TUMB performs at home games each fall and in Mardi Gras parades each spring.

=== Mascot ===
Riptide the Pelican debuted in 1998 with the re-branding of Tulane athletics. Prior to that, the school used an angry wave nicknamed "Gumby" by fans, and before that a John Chase creation named "Greenie."

== Individual honors ==
=== All-Americans ===
Tulane has had 19 players named to first-team All-America teams. Of those 19, five were consensus selections, with one being a unanimous selection.

== All-time record vs. AAC teams ==
Records current as of October 11, 2026

Opponent	Games	W	L	T	Percentage	Streak	First
Army	26	14	11	1	.558	Lost 1	1957
Charlotte	2	2	0	0	1.000	Won 2	2024
East Carolina	21	9	12	0	.429	Won 3	1991
Florida Atlantic	3	2	1	0	.667	Won 2	2013
Memphis	42	16	25	1	.393	Won 1	1954
Navy	26	13	12	1	.519	Won 1	1949
North Texas	4	4	0	0	1.000	Won 4	2013
Rice	38	17	20	1	.461	Won 2	1916
South Florida	5	4	1	0	.800	Won 4	2017
Temple	8	4	4	0	.500	Won 4	1935
Tulsa	21	8	13	0	.381	Won 3	1968
UAB	13	7	6	0	.538	Won 2	1999
UTSA	3	1	2	0	.333	Lost 1	2013
Totals	193	101	107	4	.486		

== Future opponents ==
=== Non-conference ===
Announced schedules as of August 25, 2026.

2026	2027	2028	2029	2030	2031	2032
at Duke	Louisiana	at Iowa State	Iowa State	at LSU (rivalry)		at Mississippi State
South Alabama	at Southern Miss (rivalry)					
at Kansas State	at Wake Forest					
Southern Miss (rivalry)	Nicholls					

== See also ==
- American Conference (NCAA)
- List of NCAA Division I FBS football programs
