= 1934 Vanderbilt Commodores football team =

American college football season

1934 Vanderbilt Commodores football
- Conference: Southeastern Conference
- Record: 6–3 (4–3 SEC)
- Head coach: Dan McGugin (30th season)
- Captain: Eugene Beck
- Home stadium: Dudley Field

1934 Southeastern Conference football standings
	Conf.					Overall
Team		W		L			W		L
No. 11 Tulane +	8	–	0	–	0	10	–	1	–	0
No. 6 Alabama +	7	–	0	–	0	10	–	0	–	0
Tennessee	5	–	1	–	0	8	–	2	–	0
LSU	4	–	2	–	0	7	–	2	–	2
Georgia	3	–	2	–	0	7	–	3	–	0
Vanderbilt	4	–	3	–	0	6	–	3	–	0
Florida	2	–	2	–	1	6	–	3	–	1
Ole Miss	2	–	3	–	1	4	–	5	–	1
Kentucky	1	–	3	–	0	5	–	5	–	0
Auburn	1	–	6	–	0	2	–	8	–	0
Sewanee	0	–	4	–	0	2	–	7	–	0
Mississippi State	0	–	5	–	0	4	–	6	–	0
Georgia Tech	0	–	6	–	0	1	–	9	–	0
+ – Conference co-champions; Rankings from Dickinson System

The 1934 Vanderbilt Commodores football team season represented Vanderbilt University as a member of the Southeastern Conference. (SEC) during the 1934 college football season. The Commodores who served in the 30th and final season under head coach Don Mcgugin. Vanderbilt went 6–3 overall and 4–3 in the SEC, finishing sixth. They played their six home games at Dudley Field in Nashville, Tennessee. The team's captain was Eugene Beck.

== Schedule ==
Date	Opponent	Site	Result	Attendance	Source
September 29	Mississippi State	Dudley Field; Nashville, TN	W 7–0		
October 6	at Georgia Tech	Grant Field; Atlanta, GA (rivalry)	W 27–12	10,000	
October 13	at Cincinnati*	Nippert Stadium; Cincinnati, OH	W 32–0	8,000	
October 20	Auburn	Dudley Field; Nashville, TN	W 7–6		
October 27	LSU	Dudley Field; Nashville, TN	L 0–29	20,000	
November 3	at George Washington*	Griffith Stadium; Washington, DC	W 7–6		
November 10	Sewanee^{†}	Dudley Field; Nashville, TN (rivalry)	W 19–0		
November 17	Tennessee	Dudley Field; Nashville, TN (rivalry)	L 6–13	20,000	
November 29	at Alabama	Legion Field; Birmingham, AL	L 0–34	24,000	
*Non-conference game; ^{†}Homecoming
