= 1934 Georgia Bulldogs football team =

American college football season

1934 Georgia Bulldogs football
- Conference: Southeastern Conference
- Record: 7–3 (3–2 SEC)
- Head coach: Harry Mehre (7th season)
- Home stadium: Sanford Stadium

1934 Southeastern Conference football standings
	Conf.					Overall
Team		W		L			W		L
No. 11 Tulane +	8	–	0	–	0	10	–	1	–	0
No. 6 Alabama +	7	–	0	–	0	10	–	0	–	0
Tennessee	5	–	1	–	0	8	–	2	–	0
LSU	4	–	2	–	0	7	–	2	–	2
Georgia	3	–	2	–	0	7	–	3	–	0
Vanderbilt	4	–	3	–	0	6	–	3	–	0
Florida	2	–	2	–	1	6	–	3	–	1
Ole Miss	2	–	3	–	1	4	–	5	–	1
Kentucky	1	–	3	–	0	5	–	5	–	0
Auburn	1	–	6	–	0	2	–	8	–	0
Sewanee	0	–	4	–	0	2	–	7	–	0
Mississippi State	0	–	5	–	0	4	–	6	–	0
Georgia Tech	0	–	6	–	0	1	–	9	–	0
+ – Conference co-champions; Rankings from Dickinson System

The 1934 Georgia Bulldogs football team was an American football team that represented the University of Georgia as a member of the Southeastern Conference (SEC) during the 1934 college football season. In their seventh year under head coach Harry Mehre, the Bulldogs compiled an overall record of 7–3, with a conference record of 3–2, and finished fifth in the SEC.

== Schedule ==
Date	Opponent	Site	Result	Attendance	Source
September 29	Stetson*	Sanford Stadium; Athens, GA	W 42–0	5,000	
October 6	at Furman*	Manly Field; Greenville, SC	W 7–2		
October 13	North Carolina*	Sanford Stadium; Athens, GA	L 0–14	10,000	
October 20	at Tulane	Tulane Stadium; New Orleans, LA	L 6–7	23,000	
October 27	at Alabama	Legion Field; Birmingham, AL (rivalry)	L 6–26	15,000	
November 3	vs. Florida	Fairfield Stadium; Jacksonville, FL (rivalry)	W 14–0	22,000	
November 10	at Yale*	Yale Bowl; New Haven, CT	W 14–7		
November 17	NC State*^{†}	Sanford Stadium; Athens, GA	W 27–0	8,000	
November 24	vs. Auburn	Memorial Stadium; Columbus, GA (rivalry)	W 18–0		
December 1	Georgia Tech	Sanford Stadium; Athens, GA (rivalry)	W 7–0	14,000	
*Non-conference game; ^{†}Homecoming
