= 1934 Florida Gators football team =

American college football season

1934 Florida Gators football
- Conference: Southeastern Conference
- Record: 6–3–1 (2–2–1 SEC)
- Head coach: Dennis K. Stanley (2nd season)
- Captain: Chuck Rogers
- Home stadium: Florida Field

Uniform
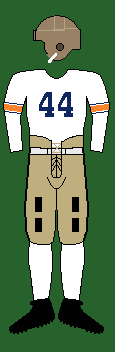

1934 Southeastern Conference football standings
	Conf.					Overall
Team		W		L			W		L
No. 11 Tulane +	8	–	0	–	0	10	–	1	–	0
No. 6 Alabama +	7	–	0	–	0	10	–	0	–	0
Tennessee	5	–	1	–	0	8	–	2	–	0
LSU	4	–	2	–	0	7	–	2	–	2
Georgia	3	–	2	–	0	7	–	3	–	0
Vanderbilt	4	–	3	–	0	6	–	3	–	0
Florida	2	–	2	–	1	6	–	3	–	1
Ole Miss	2	–	3	–	1	4	–	5	–	1
Kentucky	1	–	3	–	0	5	–	5	–	0
Auburn	1	–	6	–	0	2	–	8	–	0
Sewanee	0	–	4	–	0	2	–	7	–	0
Mississippi State	0	–	5	–	0	4	–	6	–	0
Georgia Tech	0	–	6	–	0	1	–	9	–	0
+ – Conference co-champions; Rankings from Dickinson System

The 1934 Florida Gators football team represented the University of Florida during the 1934 college football season. The season was the high-water mark of Dennis K. Stanley's three-year tenure as the head coach of the Florida Gators football team. The highlights of the season included hard-fought victories over the Auburn Tigers and Georgia Tech Yellow Jackets, both fellow Southeastern Conference (SEC) members, and the VPI Gobblers and NC State Wolfpack, two out-of-conference Southern teams. Stanley's 1934 Florida Gators finished the year with a 6–3–1 overall record and a 2–2–1 record in the SEC, placing seventh in the thirteen-member SEC.

== Schedule ==
Date	Opponent	Site	Result	Attendance	Source
September 29	vs. Rollins*	Fairfield Stadium; Jacksonville, FL	W 13–2	6,000	
October 6	at VPI*	Miles Stadium; Blacksburg, VA	W 20–13		
October 13	Tulane	Florida Field; Gainesville, FL	L 12–28	15,000	
October 20	vs. NC State*	Plant Field; Tampa, FL	W 14–0	12,000	
October 27	vs. Maryland*	Municipal Stadium; Baltimore, MD	L 0–21	8,000	
November 3	vs. Georgia	Fairfield Stadium; Jacksonville, FL (rivalry)	L 0–14	22,000	
November 10	Ole Miss	Florida Field; Gainesville, FL	T 13–13		
November 17	at Auburn	Cramton Bowl; Montgomery, AL (rivalry)	W 14–7	8,000	
November 24	Georgia Tech^{†}	Florida Field; Gainesville, FL	W 13–12		
December 1	Stetson*	Florida Field; Gainesville, FL	W 14–0		
*Non-conference game; ^{†}Homecoming

== Postseason ==
Wally Brown was named second-team All-SEC. After 1934, no Gators team would win six or more games again until the 1952 Florida Gators football team.
