= 1934 Mississippi State Maroons football team =

American college football season

1934 Mississippi State Maroons football
- Conference: Southeastern Conference
- Record: 4–6 (0–5 SEC)
- Head coach: Ross MacKechnie (2nd season)
- Home stadium: Scott Field

1934 Southeastern Conference football standings
	Conf.					Overall
Team		W		L			W		L
No. 11 Tulane +	8	–	0	–	0	10	–	1	–	0
No. 6 Alabama +	7	–	0	–	0	10	–	0	–	0
Tennessee	5	–	1	–	0	8	–	2	–	0
LSU	4	–	2	–	0	7	–	2	–	2
Georgia	3	–	2	–	0	7	–	3	–	0
Vanderbilt	4	–	3	–	0	6	–	3	–	0
Florida	2	–	2	–	1	6	–	3	–	1
Ole Miss	2	–	3	–	1	4	–	5	–	1
Kentucky	1	–	3	–	0	5	–	5	–	0
Auburn	1	–	6	–	0	2	–	8	–	0
Sewanee	0	–	4	–	0	2	–	7	–	0
Mississippi State	0	–	5	–	0	4	–	6	–	0
Georgia Tech	0	–	6	–	0	1	–	9	–	0
+ – Conference co-champions; Rankings from Dickinson System

The 1934 Mississippi State Maroons football team was an American football team that represented Mississippi State College (now known as Mississippi State University) as a member of the Southeastern Conference (SEC) during the 1934 college football season. In their second year under head coach Ross MacKechnie, the Maroons compiled an overall record of 4–6, with a conference record of 0–5, and finished 12th in the SEC.

== Schedule ==
Date	Opponent	Site	Result	Attendance	Source
September 21	at Howard (AL)*	Legion Field; Birmingham, AL	W 13–7		
September 29	at Vanderbilt	Dudley Field; Nashville, TN	L 0–7		
October 5	Millsaps*	Scott Field; Starkville, MS	L 6–7		
October 13	at Alabama	Denny Stadium; Tuscaloosa, AL (rivalry)	L 0–41	6,000	
October 20	at Southwestern (TN)*	Fargason Field; Memphis, TN	W 21–6	4,000	
October 26	Mississippi College*	Scott Field; Starkville, MS	W 13–6		
November 3	at LSU	Tiger Stadium; Baton Rouge, LA (rivalry)	L 3–25		
November 10	at Tennessee	Shields–Watkins Field; Knoxville, TN	L 0–14	5,000	
November 17	at Loyola (LA)*	Loyola University Stadium; New Orleans, LA	W 20–6		
December 1	vs. Ole Miss	Municipal Stadium; Jackson, MS (Egg Bowl)	L 3–7	10,000	
*Non-conference game
