= 1934 Tennessee Volunteers football team =

American college football season

1934 Tennessee Volunteers football
- Conference: Southeastern Conference
- Record: 8–2 (5–1 SEC)
- Head coach: Robert Neyland (9th season)
- Offensive scheme: Single-wing
- Home stadium: Shields–Watkins Field

1934 Southeastern Conference football standings
	Conf.					Overall
Team		W		L			W		L
No. 11 Tulane +	8	–	0	–	0	10	–	1	–	0
No. 6 Alabama +	7	–	0	–	0	10	–	0	–	0
Tennessee	5	–	1	–	0	8	–	2	–	0
LSU	4	–	2	–	0	7	–	2	–	2
Georgia	3	–	2	–	0	7	–	3	–	0
Vanderbilt	4	–	3	–	0	6	–	3	–	0
Florida	2	–	2	–	1	6	–	3	–	1
Ole Miss	2	–	3	–	1	4	–	5	–	1
Kentucky	1	–	3	–	0	5	–	5	–	0
Auburn	1	–	6	–	0	2	–	8	–	0
Sewanee	0	–	4	–	0	2	–	7	–	0
Mississippi State	0	–	5	–	0	4	–	6	–	0
Georgia Tech	0	–	6	–	0	1	–	9	–	0
+ – Conference co-champions; Rankings from Dickinson System

The 1934 Tennessee Volunteers (variously Tennessee, UT, or the Vols) represented the University of Tennessee in the 1934 college football season. Playing as a member of the Southeastern Conference (SEC), the team was led by head coach Robert Neyland, in his ninth year, and played their home games at Shields–Watkins Field in Knoxville, Tennessee. They finished the season with a record of eight wins and two losses (8–2 overall, 5–1 in the SEC).

== Schedule ==
Date	Time	Opponent	Site	Result	Attendance	Source
September 29	2:30 p.m.	Centre*	Shields–Watkins Field; Knoxville, TN	W 32–0	7,500	
October 5		at North Carolina*	Kenan Memorial Stadium; Chapel Hill, NC	W 19–7		
October 13		Ole Miss	Shields–Watkins Field; Knoxville, TN (rivalry)	W 27–0	10,000	
October 20		at Alabama	Legion Field; Birmingham, AL (rivalry)	L 6–13	18,000	
October 27		Duke*^{†}	Shields–Watkins Field; Knoxville, TN	W 14–6	20,000	
November 3		at Fordham*	Polo Grounds; New York, NY	L 12–13	25,000	
November 10		Mississippi State	Shields–Watkins Field; Knoxville, TN	W 14–0	5,000	
November 17		at Vanderbilt	Dudley Field; Nashville, TN (rivalry)	W 13–6	20,000	
November 29		Kentucky	Shields–Watkins Field; Knoxville, TN (rivalry)	W 19–0	18,000	
December 8		LSU	Shields–Watkins Field; Knoxville, TN	W 19–13	18,000	
*Non-conference game; ^{†}Homecoming; All times are in Central time
