= 1934 Sewanee Tigers football team =

American college football season

1934 Sewanee Tigers football
- Conference: Southeastern Conference
- Record: 2–7 (0–4 SEC)
- Head coach: Harry E. Clark (4th season)
- Home stadium: Hardee Field

1934 Southeastern Conference football standings
	Conf.					Overall
Team		W		L			W		L
No. 11 Tulane +	8	–	0	–	0	10	–	1	–	0
No. 6 Alabama +	7	–	0	–	0	10	–	0	–	0
Tennessee	5	–	1	–	0	8	–	2	–	0
LSU	4	–	2	–	0	7	–	2	–	2
Georgia	3	–	2	–	0	7	–	3	–	0
Vanderbilt	4	–	3	–	0	6	–	3	–	0
Florida	2	–	2	–	1	6	–	3	–	1
Ole Miss	2	–	3	–	1	4	–	5	–	1
Kentucky	1	–	3	–	0	5	–	5	–	0
Auburn	1	–	6	–	0	2	–	8	–	0
Sewanee	0	–	4	–	0	2	–	7	–	0
Mississippi State	0	–	5	–	0	4	–	6	–	0
Georgia Tech	0	–	6	–	0	1	–	9	–	0
+ – Conference co-champions; Rankings from Dickinson System

The 1934 Sewanee Tigers football team was an American football team that represented Sewanee: The University of the South as a member of the Southeastern Conference during the 1934 college football season. In their fourth season under head coach Harry E. Clark, Sewanee compiled a 2–7 record.

== Schedule ==
Date	Opponent	Site	Result	Source
September 29	at Southwestern (TN)*	Fargason Field; Memphis, TN (rivalry)	L 0–2	
October 6	at Alabama	Cramton Bowl; Montgomery, AL	L 6–35	
October 13	Tennessee Wesleyan*	Hardee Field; Sewanee, TN	W 21–0	
October 20	at Army*	Michie Stadium; West Point, NY	L 0–20	
October 27	at Ole Miss	Hemingway Stadium; Oxford, MS	L 6–19	
November 3	Tennessee Tech*	Hardee Field; Sewanee, TN	W 7–6	
November 10	at Vanderbilt	Dudley Field; Nashville, TN (rivalry)	L 0–19	
November 16	Cumberland (TN)*	Hardee Field; Sewanee, TN	L 0–14	
November 24	at Tulane	Tulane Stadium; New Orleans, LA	L 0–32	
*Non-conference game
