= 1934 Kentucky Wildcats football team =

American college football season

1934 Kentucky Wildcats football
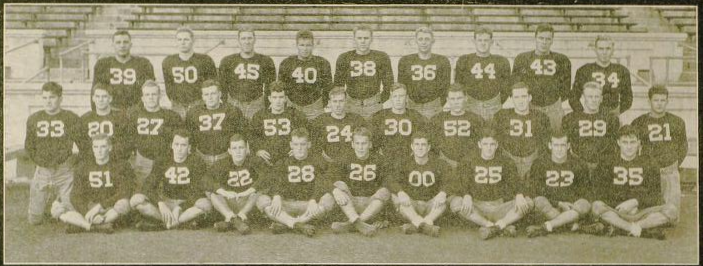
- Conference: Southeastern Conference
- Record: 5–5 (1–3 SEC)
- Head coach: Chet A. Wynne (1st season)
- Captain: Joe Rupert
- Home stadium: McLean Stadium

1934 Southeastern Conference football standings
	Conf.					Overall
Team		W		L			W		L
No. 11 Tulane +	8	–	0	–	0	10	–	1	–	0
No. 6 Alabama +	7	–	0	–	0	10	–	0	–	0
Tennessee	5	–	1	–	0	8	–	2	–	0
LSU	4	–	2	–	0	7	–	2	–	2
Georgia	3	–	2	–	0	7	–	3	–	0
Vanderbilt	4	–	3	–	0	6	–	3	–	0
Florida	2	–	2	–	1	6	–	3	–	1
Ole Miss	2	–	3	–	1	4	–	5	–	1
Kentucky	1	–	3	–	0	5	–	5	–	0
Auburn	1	–	6	–	0	2	–	8	–	0
Sewanee	0	–	4	–	0	2	–	7	–	0
Mississippi State	0	–	5	–	0	4	–	6	–	0
Georgia Tech	0	–	6	–	0	1	–	9	–	0
+ – Conference co-champions; Rankings from Dickinson System

The 1934 Kentucky Wildcats football team was an American football team that represented the University of Kentucky as a member of the Southeastern Conference (SEC) during the 1934 college football season. In their first season under head coach Chet A. Wynne, the Wildcats compiled an overall record of 5–5 record with a mark of 1–3 against conference opponents, finished ninth in the SEC, and were outscored by a total of 116 to 91. The team played its home games at McLean Stadium in Lexington, Kentucky.

== Schedule ==
Date	Opponent	Site	Result	Attendance	Source
September 22	Maryville*	McLean Stadium; Lexington, KY	W 26–0		
September 29	Washington & Lee*	McLean Stadium; Lexington, KY	L 0–7	6,000	
October 6	at Cincinnati*	Nippert Stadium; Cincinnati, OH	W 27–0		
October 13	Clemson*	McLean Stadium; Lexington, KY	W 7–0		
October 20	at North Carolina*	Kenan Memorial Stadium; Chapel Hill, NC	L 0–6		
October 27	Auburn	McLean Stadium; Lexington, KY	W 9–0	8,000	
November 3	Alabama	McLean Stadium; Lexington, KY	L 14–34	13,000	
November 10	at Southwestern (TN)*	Fargason Field; Memphis, TN	W 33–0	2,000–3,000	
November 17	Tulane	McLean Stadium; Lexington, KY	L 7–20	12,000	
November 29	at Tennessee	Shields–Watkins Field; Knoxville, TN (rivalry)	L 0–19	18,000	
*Non-conference game
