= 1934 Auburn Tigers football team =

American college football season

1934 Auburn Tigers football
- Conference: Southeastern Conference
- Record: 2–8 (1–6 SEC)
- Head coach: Jack Meagher (1st season)
- Home stadium: Drake Field; Legion Field; Cramton Bowl

1934 Southeastern Conference football standings
	Conf.					Overall
Team		W		L			W		L
No. 11 Tulane +	8	–	0	–	0	10	–	1	–	0
No. 6 Alabama +	7	–	0	–	0	10	–	0	–	0
Tennessee	5	–	1	–	0	8	–	2	–	0
LSU	4	–	2	–	0	7	–	2	–	2
Georgia	3	–	2	–	0	7	–	3	–	0
Vanderbilt	4	–	3	–	0	6	–	3	–	0
Florida	2	–	2	–	1	6	–	3	–	1
Ole Miss	2	–	3	–	1	4	–	5	–	1
Kentucky	1	–	3	–	0	5	–	5	–	0
Auburn	1	–	6	–	0	2	–	8	–	0
Sewanee	0	–	4	–	0	2	–	7	–	0
Mississippi State	0	–	5	–	0	4	–	6	–	0
Georgia Tech	0	–	6	–	0	1	–	9	–	0
+ – Conference co-champions; Rankings from Dickinson System

The 1934 Auburn Tigers football team was an American football team that represented Auburn University as a member of the Southeastern Conference (SEC) during the 1934 college football season. In their first year under head coach Jack Meagher, the Tigers compiled an overall record of 2–8, with a conference record of 1–6, and finished tenth in the SEC.

== Schedule ==
Date	Opponent	Site	Result	Attendance	Source
September 21	Birmingham–Southern*	Cramton Bowl; Montgomery, AL	L 0–7		
September 29	Oglethorpe*^{†}	Drake Field; Auburn, AL	W 15–0	5,000	
October 6	at Tulane	Tulane Stadium; New Orleans, LA (rivalry)	L 0–13		
October 13	at LSU	Tiger Stadium; Baton Rouge, LA (rivalry)	L 6–20		
October 20	at Vanderbilt	Dudley Field; Nashville, TN	L 6–7		
October 27	at Kentucky	McLean Stadium; Lexington, KY	L 0–9	8,000	
November 3	Duke*	Legion Field; Birmingham, AL	L 6–13		
November 10	at Georgia Tech	Grant Field; Atlanta, GA (rivalry)	W 18–6		
November 17	Florida	Cramton Bowl; Montgomery, AL (rivalry)	L 7–14	8,000	
November 24	vs. Georgia	Memorial Stadium; Columbus, GA (rivalry)	L 0–18		
*Non-conference game; ^{†}Homecoming
