= Biff Jones =

American football player, coach, and administrator (1895–1980)

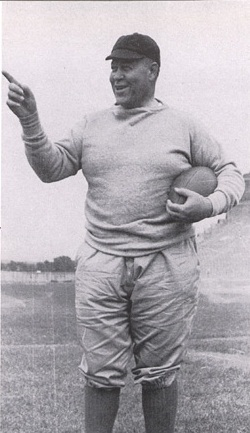
- Jones from 1941 Cornhusker

Biographical details
- Born: October 8, 1895; Washington, D.C., U.S.
- Died: February 12, 1980 (aged 84); Chevy Chase, Maryland, U.S.

Playing career
- 1915–1917: Army
- Position: Tackle

Coaching career (HC unless noted)
- 1923–1925: Army (line)
- 1926–1929: Army
- 1932–1934: LSU
- 1935–1936: Oklahoma
- 1937–1941: Nebraska

Administrative career (AD unless noted)
- 1931–1932: Army (Asst. AD)
- 1935–1936: Oklahoma
- 1937–1942: Nebraska
- 1942–1947: Army

Head coaching record
- Overall: 87–33–15
- Bowls: 0–1

Accomplishments and honors

Championships
- 1 SoCon (1932); 2 Big Six (1937, 1940)
- College Football Hall of Fame; Inducted in 1954 (profile)

Lawrence McCeney "Biff" Jones (October 8, 1895 – February 12, 1980) was an American college football player, coach, and athletics administrator. He served as a head coach at the United States Military Academy, Louisiana State University (LSU), the University of Oklahoma, and the University of Nebraska, compiling a career coaching record of 87–33–15. Jones was inducted into the College Football Hall of Fame as a coach in 1954.

== Early life ==
Jones grew up in Washington, D.C. and attended Central High School.

== Playing career ==
Jones played tackle and guard at the U. S. Military Academy at West Point from 1914 to 1916. He was slated to be captain of the 1917 Army Cadets football team, but early graduation prevented him from playing that year. Jones served as an artillery lieutenant in France during the rest of World War I and after the war was stationed with 6th Field Artillery Regiment at Fort Hoyle, Maryland.

== Coaching career ==
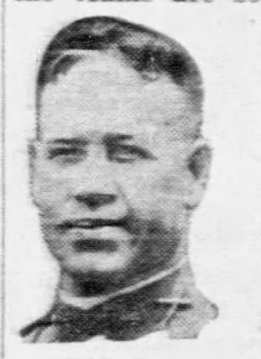
Jones, circa 1926

Jones returned to West Point in 1923 as an assistant under head football coach John McEwan. When McEwan left for Oregon after the 1925 season, Jones was promoted to head coach. He served for four years as head coach of the Cadet football team, then was assigned by the Army to United States Army Field Artillery School at Fort Sill, Oklahoma. He returned to West Point in 1931 as assistant athletic director, with the expectation that he would succeed Philip Bracken Fleming the following year. However, Jones decided to return to coaching and in January 1932 signed a contract with Louisiana State University to coach the LSU Tigers football team. He was allowed to retain his rank in the United States Army and served as a Reserve Officers' Training Corps instructor at the school.

Jones was head coach at LSU for three seasons, and led the team to a Southern Conference Championship in 1932. He resigned after the 1934 season after a heated exchange with noted LSU supporter, Louisiana senator Huey P. Long. In the last game of the season, Long was displeased after the team had lost two straight games and was trailing at halftime to Oregon. Long decided to give a motivational speech to the team at halftime, but was turned away by Jones at the locker room door. The ensuing argument ended with Jones declaring to resign, effective at the end of the game. LSU won the game 14–13.

Following his resignation, Jones was a highly-sought coaching candidate. In April 5, 1935, Jones was hired by the University of Oklahoma and the United States Department of War approved his transfer. Jones coached the Oklahoma Sooners during the 1935 and 1936 seasons and taught classes in military science. On November 18, 1936, the Army transferred Jones to the United States Army Command and General Staff College at Fort Leavenworth, which ended his tenure at Oklahoma.

Rather than leave coaching, Jones chose to retire from the Army. He was released from active duty on February 11, 1937, retiring with the rank of major. This allowed him to accept the head coaching position with the Nebraska Cornhuskers. Jones remained at Nebraska for five years and tallied a 28–14–4 mark. He led Nebraska to its first bowl game, the 1941 Rose Bowl, and also coached the second-ever televised college football game.

== Later life ==
In 1942, Jones was ordered to active duty and was appointed athletic director at West Point. He was released from active duty in 1945 and was invited back to Nebraska, but only as athletic director. On November 28, 1945, he informed the university that he would not return. He remained at West Point until his retirement in 1948.

Biff Jones died February 13, 1980, at his home in Chevy Chase, Maryland. His wife had died in 1978.

== Head coaching record ==
Year	Team	Overall	Conference	Standing	Bowl/playoffs	AP^{#}
Army Cadets (Independent) (1926–1929)
1926	Army	7–1–1				
1927	Army	9–1				
1928	Army	8–2				
1929	Army	6–4–1				
Army:		30–8–2				
LSU Tigers (Southern Conference) (1932)
1932	LSU	6–3–1	4–0	T–1st		
LSU Tigers (Southeastern Conference) (1933–1934)
1933	LSU	7–0–3	3–0–2	2nd		
1934	LSU	7–2–2	4–2	4th		
LSU:		20–5–6	11–2–2			
Oklahoma Sooners (Big Six Conference) (1935–1936)
1935	Oklahoma	6–3	3–2	2nd		
1936	Oklahoma	3–3–3	1–2–2	4th		
Oklahoma:		9–6–3	4–4–3			
Nebraska Cornhuskers (Big Six Conference) (1937–1941)
1937	Nebraska	6–1–2	3–0–2	1st		11
1938	Nebraska	3–5–1	2–3	T–3rd		
1939	Nebraska	7–1–1	4–1	2nd		18
1940	Nebraska	8–2	5–0	1st	L Rose	7
1941	Nebraska	4–5	3–2	T–2nd		
Nebraska:		28–14–4	17–6–2			
Total:		87–33–15				
National championship Conference title Conference division title or championship game berth
^{#}Rankings from final AP Poll.
