= 1935 Sugar Bowl =

American college football game

- 1st Sugar Bowl
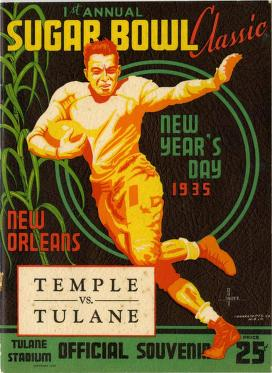
- Cover of the game program
Temple Owls	Tulane Green Wave
(7–0–2)	(9–1)
Independent	SEC
14	20
Head coach: Pop Warner	Head coach: Ted Cox
	1	2	3	4	Total
Temple	7	7	0	0	14
Tulane	0	7	7	6	20
- Date: January 1, 1935
- Season: 1934
- Stadium: Tulane Stadium
- Location: New Orleans, Louisiana
- Referee: Everett Strupper
- Attendance: 22,206
- Payout: US$27,800 (each)

The 1935 Sugar Bowl was the first Sugar Bowl game. Tulane (9–1) hosted unbeaten Temple (7–0–2) before a crowd of 22,206 in New Orleans with the kickoff at 1:30 pm CST. Temple took a 14–0 lead before Tulane came back to win the game, 20–14. The game was played at Tulane's home field, so it was technically a home game for the Green Wave. Temple had been ranked 15th in a November 15, 1934, AP football poll.

The Mid-Winter Sports Association of New Orleans was formed in 1934 to formulate plans for an annual New Year’s Day football classic. On December 2, 1934, the Association’s executive board selected Tulane and unbeaten Temple to play in the first game. Columbia and Colgate were also considered by the Association to represent the east.

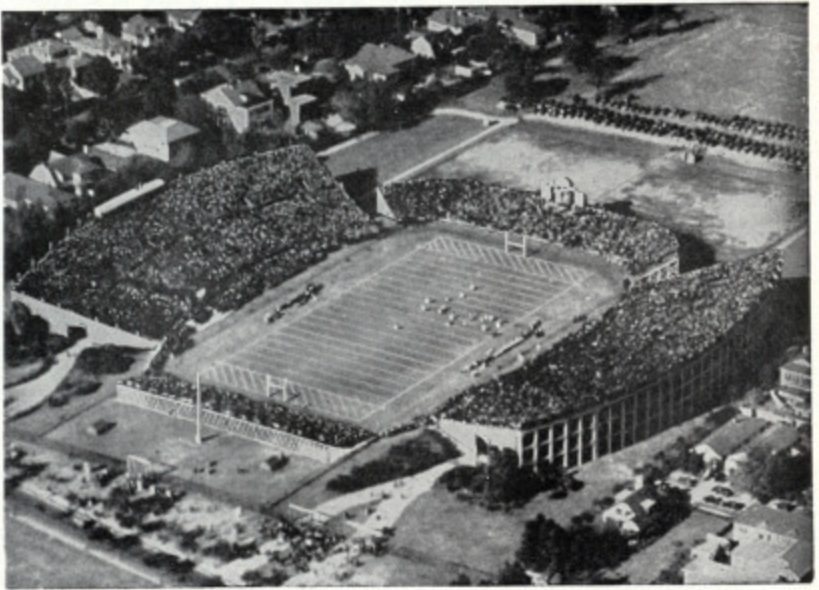
Aerial view of the game

The most notable play of the game came in the second quarter when Tulane's quarterback John McDaniel caught a Temple kickoff, ran to the right to draw tacklers, then threw a lateral pass to his teammate Monk Simons who ran 75 yards for the touchdown. Two more Tulane touchdowns in the second half outweighed Temple's early lead.
