= Ed Walker (American football) =

American college football and basketball coach

Biographical details
- Born: March 25, 1901; Jonesboro, Louisiana, U.S.
- Died: June 16, 1972 (aged 71); Jackson, Louisiana, U.S.

Playing career

Football
- 1924–1926: Stanford
- Positions: End, halfback

Coaching career (HC unless noted)

Football
- 1927–1928: Stanford (line)
- 1929: Columbia (line)
- 1930–1937: Ole Miss
- 1945: Second Air Force

Basketball
- 1930–1935: Ole Miss

Administrative career (AD unless noted)
- 1930–1938: Ole Miss

Head coaching record
- Overall: 41–45–8 (football); 46–36 (basketball)
- Bowls: 0–1

Edgar Lee Walker (March 25, 1901 – June 16, 1972) was an American football player, coach of football and basketball, and college athletics administrator. He served as the head football coach at the University of Mississippi (Ole Miss) from 1930 to 1937, compiling a record of 38–38–8. Walker was also the head basketball coach at Ole Miss from 1930 to 1935, tallying a mark of 46–36.

During World War II, Walker served in the United States Army Air Forces and was head coach of the 1945 Second Air Force Superbombers football team.

== Head coaching record ==
=== Football ===
Year	Team	Overall	Conference	Standing	Bowl/playoffs
Ole Miss Rebels (Southern Conference) (1930–1932)
1930	Ole Miss	3–5–1	1–5	T–9th	
1931	Ole Miss	2–6–1	1–5	21st	
1932	Ole Miss	5–6	2–3	T–12th	
Ole Miss Rebels (Southeastern Conference) (1933–1937)
1933	Ole Miss	6–3–2	2–2–1	T–6th	
1934	Ole Miss	4–5–1	2–3–1	8th	
1935	Ole Miss	9–3	3–1	3rd	L Orange
1936	Ole Miss	5–5–2	0–3–1	12th	
1937	Ole Miss	4–5–1	0–4	11th	
Ole Miss:		38–38–8	11–26–3		
Second Air Force Superbombers (Army Air Forces League) (1945)
1945	Second Air Force	3–7	1–5	7th	
Second Air Force:		3–7	1–5		
Total:		41–45–8			
