= Ted Cox (American football) =

American football player and coach (1903–1989)

- Cox pictured in The Redskin 1937, Oklahoma A&M yearbook

Biographical details
- Born: June 30, 1903; Sault Ste. Marie, Michigan, U.S.
- Died: November 5, 1989 (aged 86)

Playing career

Football
- 1922–1924: Minnesota

Basketball
- 1924–1925: Minnesota
- Position: Tackle (football)

Coaching career (HC unless noted)

Football
- 1925–1926: River Falls State
- 1927–1928: Tulane (freshmen)
- 1929–1931: Tulane (line)
- 1932–1935: Tulane
- 1936–1938: Oklahoma A&M
- 1939–1940: LSU (line)

Basketball
- 1925–1927: River Falls State

Head coaching record
- Overall: 46–34–3 (football); 10–8 (basketball)
- Bowls: 1–0

Accomplishments and honors

Championships
- Football; 2 WIAC (1925–1926); 1 SEC (1934) Basketball; 1 WIAC (1928)

Theodore J. Cox (June 30, 1903 – November 5, 1989) was an American football and basketball player and coach. He served as the head football coach at River Falls State Normal School—now known as the University of Wisconsin–River Falls—from 1925 to 1926, at Tulane University from 1932 to 1935, and at Oklahoma Agricultural and Mechanical College—now known as Oklahoma State University–Stillwater—from 1936 to 1937, compiling a career college football record of 46–34–3. Cox was also the head basketball coach at River Falls State from 1925 to 1927, tallying a mark of 10–8.

Cox was born in Sault Ste. Marie, Michigan. He played as a tackle at the University of Minnesota from 1922 to 1924. Cox also competed in basketball and track and field for the Minnesota Golden Gophers, placing second in the hammer throw at the 1925 NCAA Division I Outdoor Track and Field Championships. Cox was hired as football and basketball coach at River Falls State in 1925. Cox joined Tulane in 1927 as the coach of their freshmen football players, working under head football coach and fellow Minnesota alumnus, Bernie Bierman. Cox was promoted to coaching Tulane's linemen in 1929, and became the head coach before the 1932 season. He compiled a 28–10–2 record as head coach of the Green Wave. His 1934 team went 10–1, won a share of the Southeastern Conference championship, and defeated the Temple Owls in the Sugar Bowl. In 1935, despite posting a winning record at 6–4, he was fired. From 1936 to 1938, he coached at Oklahoma A&M, and compiled a 7–23 record.

== Head coaching record ==
=== Football ===
Year	Team	Overall	Conference	Standing	Bowl/playoffs
River Falls State Falcons (Wisconsin Intercollegiate Athletic Conference) (1925–1927)
1925	River Falls State	5–1–1	4–0	1st	
1926	River Falls State	6–0	4–0	1st	
River Falls State:		11–1–1	8–0		
Tulane Green Wave (Southern Conference) (1932)
1932	Tulane	6–2–1	5–2–1	8th	
Tulane Green Wave (Southeastern Conference) (1933–1935)
1933	Tulane	6–3–1	4–2–1	5th	
1934	Tulane	10–1	8–0	T–1st	W Sugar
1935	Tulane	6–4	3–3	T–6th	
Tulane:		28–10–2	20–7–2		
Oklahoma A&M Cowboys (Missouri Valley Conference) (1936–1938)
1936	Oklahoma A&M	1–9	1–2	5th	
1937	Oklahoma A&M	4–6	2–2	T–4th	
1938	Oklahoma A&M	2–8	0–4	6th	
Oklahoma A&M:		7–23	3–8		
Total:		46–34–3			
National championship Conference title Conference division title or championship game berth
