= 1935 Rose Bowl =

American college football game

- 21st Rose Bowl Game
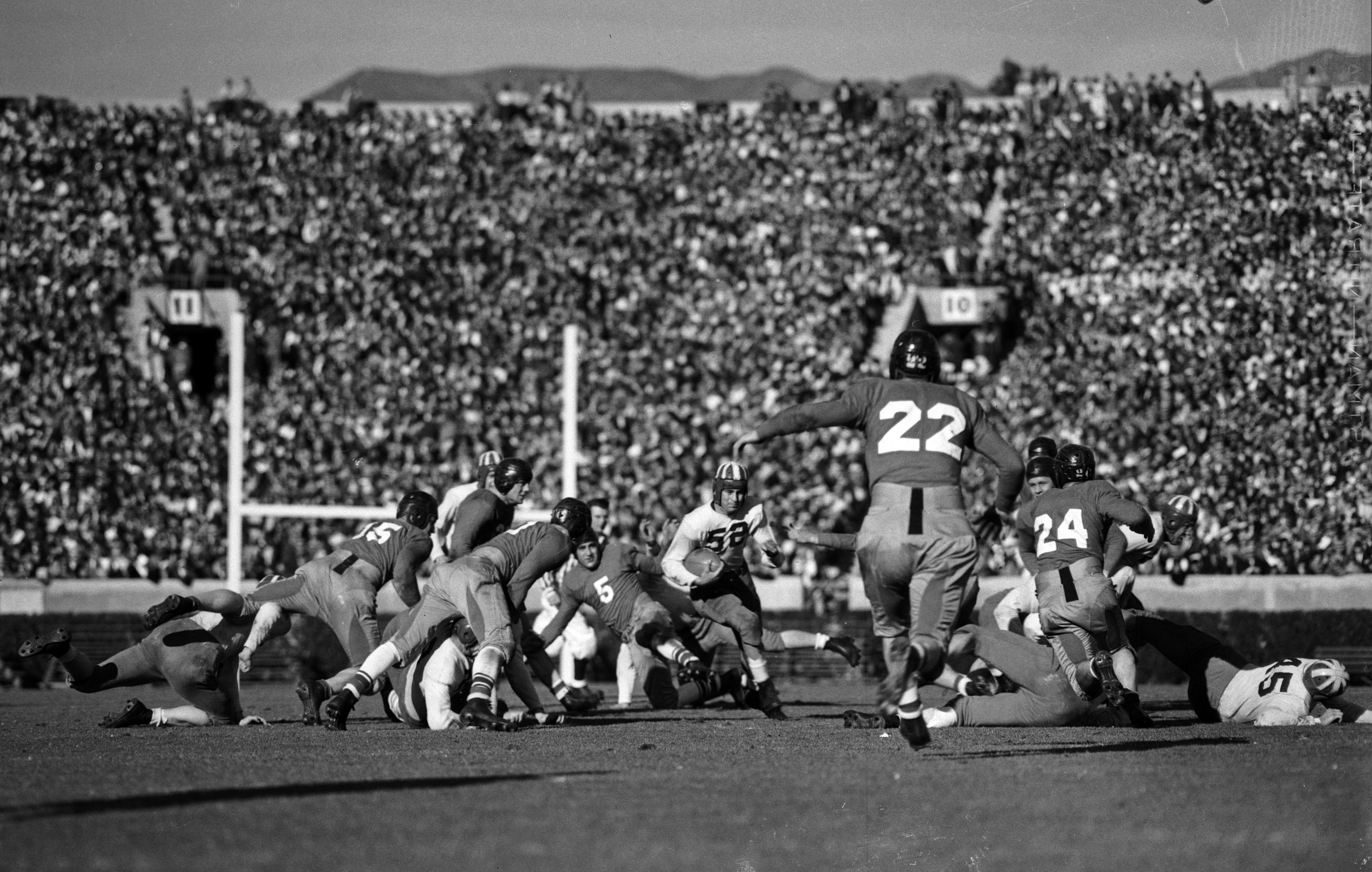
- Alabama's Jimmy Angelich (52) carrying the ball
Alabama Crimson Tide	Stanford Indians
(9–0)	(9–0–1)
SEC	PCC
29	13
Head coach: Frank Thomas	Head coach: Tiny Thornhill
	1	2	3	4	Total
Alabama	0	22	0	7	29
Stanford	7	0	6	0	13
- Date: January 1, 1935
- Season: 1934
- Stadium: Rose Bowl Stadium
- Location: Pasadena, California
- MVP: “Dixie” Howell (HB) – Alabama
- Referee: Bob Evans
- Attendance: 84,474

The 1935 Rose Bowl was the 21st Rose Bowl game, an American post-season college football game that was played on New Year's Day 1935 in Pasadena, California. It featured the Alabama Crimson Tide against the Stanford Indians. This was the second consecutive Rose Bowl appearance for Stanford's class of 1936 players, nicknamed the "Vow Boys".

== Scoring ==
=== First Quarter ===
- Stan – Bobby Grayson, 1-yard run (Moscrip kick good)

=== Second Quarter ===
- Ala – Dixie Howell, 5-yard run (Smith kick failed)
- Ala – Smith, 27-yard field goal
- Ala – Howell, 67-yard run (Smith kick good)
- Ala – Don Hutson, 54-yard pass from Riley (Hutson kick failed)

=== Third Quarter ===
- Stan – "Buck" Van Dellen, 12-yard run (Moscrip kick failed)

=== Fourth Quarter ===
- Ala – Don Hutson, 59-yard pass from Howell (Smith kick good)

== Game notes ==
Following his performance in the Rose Bowl game, Hutson played 11 seasons with the Green Bay Packers, caught 889 passes in 118 games, an average of 7.53 per game, and scored 101 touchdowns, catching 17 one season. Dixie Howell signed with the Detroit Tigers and played minor league baseball for eight seasons and was a college football head coach at Arizona State and Idaho. The "other end" for the Crimson Tide, was Paul "Bear" Bryant. Bryant went on to be head coach at the University of Maryland, College Park, the University of Kentucky, Texas A&M University, and the University of Alabama. He won six national championships at the University of Alabama. Upon his retirement in 1982, he held the record for most wins as head coach in college football history with 323 wins.
