= Ole Miss–Tulane football rivalry =

American college football rivalry

- Ole Miss Rebels Tulane Green Wave
- Other names: Mississippi mud-pie rivals
- First meeting: December 2, 1893; Ole Miss 12, Tulane 4
- Latest meeting: December 20, 2025; Ole Miss 41, Tulane 10

Statistics
- Total meetings: 75
- All-time series: Ole Miss leads, 45–28 (.616)
- Largest victory: Ole Miss, 50–0 (1957)
- Longest win streak: Ole Miss, 13 (1989–present)
- Current win streak: Ole Miss, 13 (1989–present)

Locations of Ole Miss and Tulane

The Ole Miss–Tulane football rivalry is an American college football rivalry between the Ole Miss Rebels and Tulane Green Wave. The rivalry began in 1893. Ole Miss leads the series 45–28. It is Tulane's second-oldest football rivalry, one week younger than the Battle for the Rag. It is Ole Miss' oldest rivalry, predating its rivalries with Mississippi State, Alabama, LSU, and Vanderbilt by a year, and Tulane is Ole Miss' most-played opponent not currently in the Southeastern Conference (SEC).

== Series history ==
The first game took place on December 2, 1893, in New Orleans, and the two schools have continued to play each other with few interruptions since. Tulane and Ole Miss spent much of their athletic histories as members of the same conference: the SIAA from 1899 to 1920, the Southern Conference from 1922 to 1932, and as charter members of the SEC from 1932 to 1966. Ole Miss did not play a game against Tulane at home in Oxford, Mississippi, until 1920, and it was not until 1951 that the teams began to frequently alternate hosting the game.

One of the most fascinating games played between the two rivals occurred October 17, 1964. This game was known as the Mississippi Mud-Pie Bowl, where the Ole Miss Rebels defeated the Tulane Green Wave at Tulane Stadium, 14-9. With a significant effort by Quarterback Jim Weatherly who put the offense on his back. After the game many who watched, coined it the Mississippi Mud-Pie Bowl, due to the down and dirty play of both teams until the final whistle.

The Ole Miss–Tulane game on November 30, 1974, was the last collegiate football game played in Tulane Stadium, and the game on September 20, 1975, was the first collegiate game played in the Louisiana Superdome.

In 1983, Tulane forfeited their victory over Ole Miss (along with a victory over Florida State) after the Supreme Court of the United States declined to hear a case on the eligibility of quarterback Jon English, son of first-year head coach Wally English, which resulted in the NCAA ruling of his being ineligible due to failing to follow transfer rules being upheld.

The schools have met twice when both schools were ranked in the AP poll. In 1956, No. 19 Tulane beat No. 6 Ole Miss, 10–3; in 2023, No. 11 Ole Miss pulled away in the final minutes to beat No. 23 Tulane, 37–20, despite trailing most of the game.

In 2025, #13 Ole Miss defeated the Wave at home 45–10. Both schools would eventually rematch in the CFP First Round in Oxford, as #6 Ole Miss defeated #20 Tulane 41–10.

Tulane is currently a member of the American Conference, while Ole Miss remains in the SEC.

== Game results ==
Ole Miss victories	Tulane victories	Forfeits / Vacated wins

No.	Date	Location	Winner	Score
1	December 2, 1893	New Orleans	Ole Miss	12–4
2	November 29, 1894	New Orleans	Ole Miss	8–2
3	November 28, 1895	New Orleans	Tulane	28–4
4	November 26, 1896	New Orleans	Tulane	10–0
5	December 12, 1898	New Orleans	Tulane	14–9
6	November 30, 1899	New Orleans	Ole Miss	15–0
7	November 29, 1900	New Orleans	Tulane	12–0
8	November 28, 1901	New Orleans	Tulane	25–11
9	November 27, 1902	New Orleans	Ole Miss	10–0
10	November 24, 1904	New Orleans	Tulane	22–0
11	November 3, 1906	New Orleans	Ole Miss	17–0
12	October 31, 1908	New Orleans	Tulane	10–0
13	October 16, 1909	New Orleans	Tulane	5–0
14	October 13, 1910	New Orleans	Ole Miss	16–0
15	November 7, 1914	New Orleans	Ole Miss	21–6
16	October 25, 1919	New Orleans	Tulane	27–12
17	October 23, 1920	Oxford	Tulane	32–0
18	October 8, 1921	New Orleans	Tulane	26–0
19	November 17, 1923	New Orleans	Tulane	19–0
20	October 10, 1925	New Orleans	Tulane	21–7
21	October 30, 1926	New Orleans	Tulane	6–0
22	October 1, 1927	New Orleans	Tulane	19–7
23	September 26, 1931	New Orleans	Tulane	31–0
24	November 3, 1934	New Orleans	Tulane	15–0
25	September 26, 1936	New Orleans	Tulane	7–6
26	October 30, 1937	New Orleans	Tulane	14–7
27	October 28, 1939	New Orleans	#9 Tulane	18–6
28	October 25, 1941	New Orleans	Ole Miss	20–13
29	October 18, 1947	New Orleans	Ole Miss	27–14
30	October 16, 1948	New Orleans	Tulane	20–7
31	October 21, 1950	New Orleans	Tulane	27–20
32	October 20, 1951	Oxford	Ole Miss	25–6
33	October 18, 1952	New Orleans	Ole Miss	20–14
34	October 17, 1953	New Orleans	Ole Miss	45–14
35	October 16, 1954	Oxford	#7 Ole Miss	34–7
36	October 15, 1955	New Orleans	Ole Miss	27–13
37	October 20, 1956	Jackson	#19 Tulane	10–3
38	October 18, 1957	New Orleans	#11 Ole Miss	50–0
39	October 11, 1958	New Orleans	#7 Ole Miss	19–8

No.	Date	Location	Winner	Score
40	October 17, 1959	Oxford	#5 Ole Miss	53–7
41	October 15, 1960	New Orleans	#1 Ole Miss	26–13
42	October 21, 1961	Jackson	#2 Ole Miss	41–0
43	October 20, 1962	Jackson	#5 Ole Miss	21–0
44	October 19, 1963	New Orleans	#5 Ole Miss	21–0
45	October 17, 1964	New Orleans	Ole Miss	14–9
46	October 16, 1965	Jackson	Ole Miss	24–7
47	November 30, 1974	New Orleans	Ole Miss	26–10
48	September 20, 1975	New Orleans	Tulane	14–3
49	September 18, 1976	Oxford	#20 Ole Miss	34–7
50	November 11, 1978	Oxford	Ole Miss	13–3
51	November 10, 1979	New Orleans	Tulane	49–15
52	September 27, 1980	Oxford	Tulane	26–24
53	September 5, 1981	New Orleans	Ole Miss	19–18
54	November 6, 1982	Jackson	Ole Miss	45–14
55	September 10, 1983†	New Orleans	Tulane	27–23
56	September 29, 1984	Oxford	Ole Miss	19–14
57	September 28, 1985	New Orleans	Ole Miss	27–10
58	September 27, 1986	Oxford	Ole Miss	35–10
59	September 26, 1987	New Orleans	Tulane	31–24
60	November 5, 1988	Oxford	Tulane	14–9
61	October 21, 1989	New Orleans	Ole Miss	32–28
62	September 29, 1990	Oxford	Ole Miss	31–21
63	August 31, 1991	New Orleans	Ole Miss	22–3
64	September 12, 1992	Oxford	Ole Miss	35–9
65	November 12, 1994	New Orleans	Ole Miss	38–0
66	October 7, 1995	Oxford	Ole Miss	20–17
67	November 15, 1997	New Orleans	Ole Miss	41–24
68	October 9, 1999	Oxford	Ole Miss	20–13
69	September 2, 2000	Oxford	#18 Ole Miss	49–20
70	September 11, 2010‡	New Orleans	Ole Miss	27–13
71	September 22, 2012‡	New Orleans	Ole Miss	39–0
72	September 18, 2021	Oxford	#17 Ole Miss	61–21
73	September 9, 2023	New Orleans	#20 Ole Miss	37–20
74	September 20, 2025	Oxford	#13 Ole Miss	45–10
75	December 20, 2025*	Oxford	#6 Ole Miss	41–10
Series: Ole Miss leads 45–28
† Ole Miss was declared the winner by forfeit ‡ Ole Miss vacated win as part of NCAA penalties *College football playoff game

== See also ==
- List of NCAA college football rivalry games
