= Memphis–Ole Miss football rivalry =

American college football rivalry

- Memphis Tigers Ole Miss Rebels
- First meeting: October 1, 1921; Ole Miss, 82–0
- Latest meeting: August 31, 2019; Memphis, 15–10

Statistics
- Total meetings: 63
- All-time series: Ole Miss leads, 47–12–2
- Largest victory: Ole Miss, 92–0 (1935)
- Longest win streak: Ole Miss, 17 (1921–1962)
- Current win streak: Memphis, 1 (2019–present)

Locations of Memphis and Ole Miss

The Memphis–Ole Miss football rivalry, also known as the Mid–South Rivalry, is an American college football rivalry game between the Tigers of the University of Memphis and the Rebels of the University of Mississippi. The series began in 1921. Ole Miss leads 47–12–2.

== History ==
As of 2019, Ole Miss is tied as Memphis's most frequent opponent, and Memphis is Ole Miss's most common non-conference opponent. The two schools, separated by around 80 miles, first met in 1921, with Ole Miss winning the first 17 games. The 1963 game had a scoreless tie, and Memphis won its first game in the series in 1967. From 1962 to 1995, the series was played annually except 1975 in Oxford; Memphis; and Jackson, Mississippi.

On October 17, 2015, Memphis upset no. 13 Ole Miss 37–24. It was the first time the Tigers defeated the Rebels since 2004 and first win over a ranked opponent since 1996. Memphis was Ole Miss's homecoming opponent on October 1, 2016, and no. 16 Ole Miss won 48–28. However, in early 2019, Ole Miss vacated 33 wins from the 2010 to 2016 seasons, including the 2014 and 2016 wins over Memphis, due to NCAA violations.

With the 63rd meeting between Memphis and Ole Miss on August 31, 2019, a 15–10 Memphis win in Memphis, Ole Miss became tied with Southern Miss as Memphis's most frequent opponent.

== Rivalry debate ==
It is disputed if this series can be considered a traditional rivalry. As early as 1994, The Commercial Appeal in Memphis referred to the Memphis–Ole Miss football series as a "Mid-South rivalry." In later years, "Mid-South rivalry" began to be used by the Memphis and Ole Miss athletic departments as well as media outlets like SB Nation.

Prior to the 2019 football game, former Ole Miss receiver A. J. Brown tweeted that the series was "not a rivalry," and Ole Miss quarterback Matt Corral answered "no" when asked by a reporter if he considered Ole Miss and Memphis to be rivals. There are no future scheduled games between Memphis and Ole Miss.

== Game results ==
Memphis victories	Ole Miss victories	Tie games	Vacated wins

No.	Date	Location	Winner	Score
1	October 1, 1921	Oxford, MS	Ole Miss	82–0
2	September 29, 1934	Oxford, MS	Ole Miss	44–0
3	September 28, 1935	Oxford, MS	Ole Miss	92–0
4	November 18, 1939	Oxford, MS	Ole Miss	46–7
5	November 16, 1940	Oxford, MS	#17 Ole Miss	38–7
6	October 31, 1942	Oxford, MS	Ole Miss	48–0
7	September 16, 1949	Memphis, TN	Ole Miss	40–7
8	September 22, 1950	Memphis, TN	Ole Miss	39–7
9	September 21, 1951	Memphis, TN	Ole Miss	32–0
10	September 19, 1952	Memphis, TN	Ole Miss	54–6
11	November 6, 1954	Memphis, TN	#9 Ole Miss	51–0
12	November 5, 1955	Memphis, TN	#15 Ole Miss	39–6
13	November 10, 1956	Memphis, TN	Ole Miss	26–0
14	September 20, 1958	Memphis, TN	#6 Ole Miss	17–0
15	October 3, 1959	Oxford, MS	#3 Ole Miss	46–0
16	October 1, 1960	Memphis, TN	#1 Ole Miss	31–20
17	September 22, 1962	Memphis, TN	#6 Ole Miss	21–7
18	September 21, 1963	Memphis, TN	Tie	0–0
19	September 19, 1964	Oxford, MS	#1 Ole Miss	30–0
20	September 18, 1965	Memphis, TN	Ole Miss	34–14
21	September 17, 1966	Memphis, TN	Ole Miss	13–0
22	September 23, 1967	Memphis, TN	Memphis State	27–17
23	September 21, 1968	Memphis, TN	Ole Miss	21–7
24	September 20, 1969	Oxford, MS	#9 Ole Miss	28–3
25	September 19, 1970	Memphis, TN	#5 Ole Miss	47–13
26	September 18, 1971	Memphis, TN	Ole Miss	49–21
27	September 16, 1972	Memphis, TN	#19 Ole Miss	34–29
28	September 22, 1973	Jackson, MS	Memphis State	17–13
29	September 21, 1974	Memphis, TN	Memphis State	15–7
30	September 4, 1976	Memphis, TN	Memphis State	21–16
31	September 3, 1977	Jackson, MS	Ole Miss	7–3
32	September 9, 1978	Jackson, MS	Ole Miss	14–7
33	September 15, 1979	Memphis, TN	Ole Miss	38–34

No.	Date	Location	Winner	Score
34	September 13, 1980	Oxford, MS	Ole Miss	61–7
35	September 19, 1981	Memphis, TN	Ole Miss	7–3
36	September 4, 1982	Oxford, MS	Ole Miss	27–10
37	September 3, 1983	Memphis, TN	Memphis State	37–17
38	September 8, 1984	Oxford, MS	Ole Miss	22–6
39	September 7, 1985	Memphis, TN	Tie	17–17
40	September 6, 1986	Jackson, MS	Ole Miss	28–6
41	September 5, 1987	Memphis, TN	Memphis State	17–16
42	September 3, 1988	Jackson, MS	Ole Miss	24–6
43	September 2, 1989	Memphis, TN	Ole Miss	20–13
44	September 8, 1990	Oxford, MS	Ole Miss	23–21
45	September 7, 1991	Memphis, TN	Ole Miss	10–0
46	November 7, 1992	Oxford, MS	Ole Miss	17–12
47	November 6, 1993	Memphis, TN	Memphis State	19–3
48	November 5, 1994	Oxford, MS	Memphis	17–16
49	November 4, 1995	Memphis, TN	Ole Miss	34–3
50	September 5, 1998	Oxford, MS	Ole Miss	30–10
51	September 4, 1999	Memphis, TN	Ole Miss	3–0
52	September 7, 2002	Oxford, MS	Ole Miss	38–16
53	September 6, 2003	Memphis, TN	Memphis	44–34
54	September 4, 2004	Oxford, MS	Memphis	20–13
55	September 5, 2005	Memphis, TN	Ole Miss	10–6
56	September 3, 2006	Oxford, MS	Ole Miss	28–25
57	September 1, 2007	Memphis, TN	Ole Miss	23–21
58	August 30, 2008	Oxford, MS	Ole Miss	41–24
59	September 6, 2009	Memphis, TN	#8 Ole Miss	45–14
60	September 27, 2014	Oxford, MS	#10 Ole Miss †	24–3
61	October 17, 2015	Memphis, TN	Memphis	37–24
62	October 1, 2016	Oxford, MS	#16 Ole Miss †	48–28
63	August 31, 2019	Memphis, TN	Memphis	15–10
Series: Ole Miss leads 47–12–2
† Vacated by Ole Miss.

== Other sports ==
In contrast to Ole Miss dominating the football series, Memphis has a 29–17 lead over Ole Miss in men's basketball as of 2025 in a series dating back to 1922. Most recently, Ole Miss defeated Memphis 83–77 in Oxford on November 11, 2025.

Ole Miss women's basketball has a 34–13 series lead over Memphis in a series that was played from 1972 to 2025. Ole Miss has a five-game winning streak in the series, most recently winning 73–64 in overtime at Memphis on November 18, 2025.

In women's volleyball, Memphis and Ole Miss had at least one meeting per season from 1993 to 2007 but met only twice since 2008. Ole Miss has a narrow 36–33 series lead over Memphis; the most recent game was a 3–2 Memphis win in Oxford on September 11, 2018, the first Memphis win at Ole Miss since 1995.

Ole Miss leads the baseball series over Memphis 60–39 as of 2020.

== See also ==
- List of NCAA college football rivalry games
