= Alabama–Georgia Tech football rivalry =

American college football rivalry

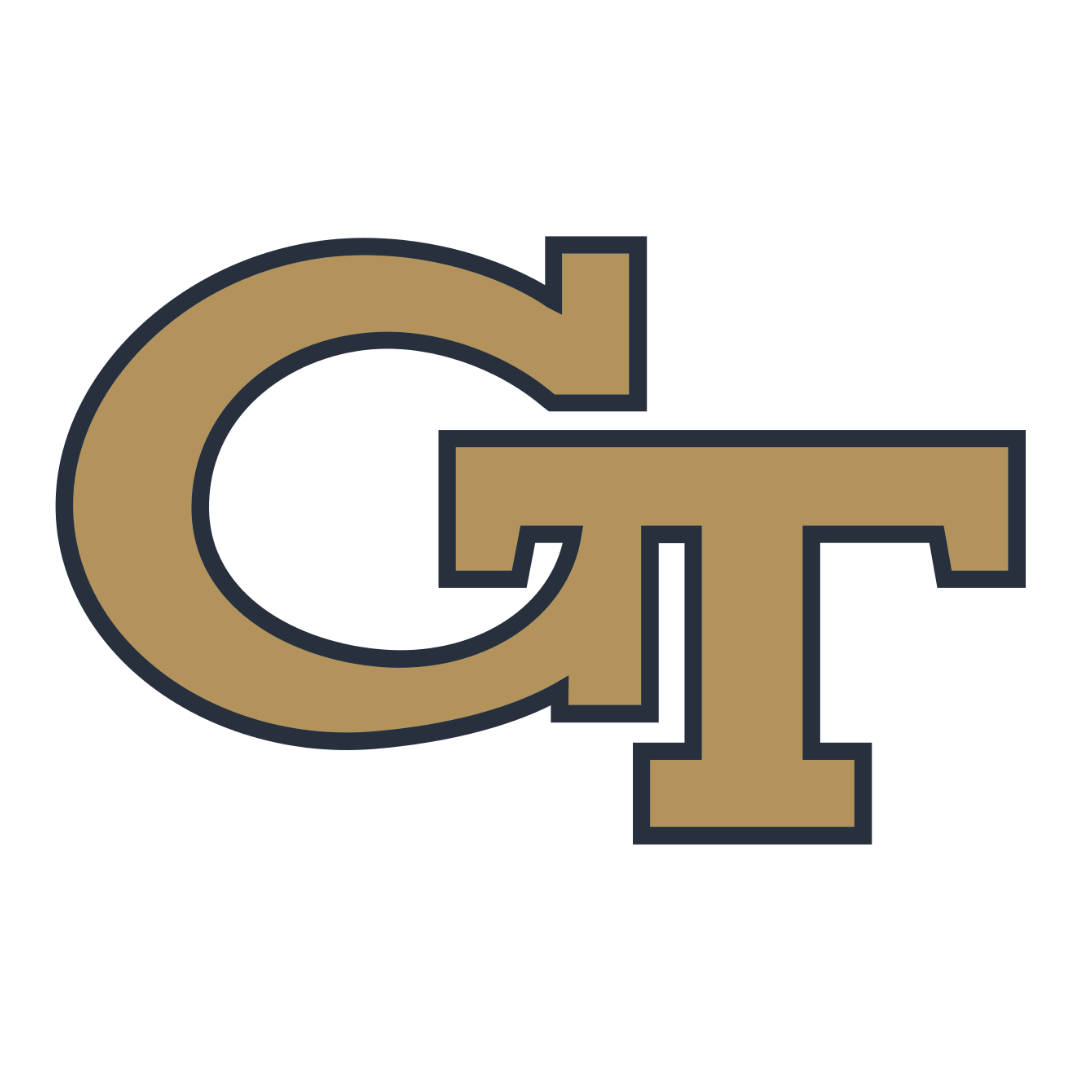
- Alabama Crimson Tide Georgia Tech Yellow Jackets
- First meeting: November 27, 1902; Alabama, 26–0
- Latest meeting: September 15, 1984; Georgia Tech, 16–6
- Next meeting: August 31, 2030

Statistics
- Total meetings: 52
- All-time series: Alabama leads, 28–21–3
- Largest victory: Alabama, 40–0 (1934)
- Longest win streak: Alabama, 5 (1933–1937)
- Current win streak: Georgia Tech, 1 (1984–present)

Locations of Alabama and Georgia Tech

The Alabama–Georgia Tech football rivalry is an American college football rivalry between the Alabama Crimson Tide football team of the University of Alabama and Georgia Tech Yellow Jackets football team of the Georgia Institute of Technology. Dormant since 1984, the series is set to be renewed in 2030 and 2031, at which point it will have been unplayed for 46 years.

== Game results ==
Alabama victories	Georgia Tech victories	Tie games

No.	Date	Location	Winning team		Losing team	
1	November 27, 1902	Birmingham, AL	Alabama	26	Georgia Tech	0
2	October 21, 1905	Atlanta, GA	Georgia Tech	12	Alabama	5
3	October 24, 1908	Atlanta, GA	Georgia Tech	11	Alabama	6
4	October 22, 1910	Tuscaloosa, AL	Georgia Tech	36	Alabama	0
5	October 29, 1911	Atlanta, GA	Tie	0	Tie	0
6	October 12, 1912	Atlanta, GA	Georgia Tech	20	Alabama	0
7	October 17, 1914	Birmingham, AL	Alabama	13	Georgia Tech	0
8	November 6, 1915	Atlanta, GA	Georgia Tech	21	Alabama	7
9	November 11, 1916	Atlanta, GA	Georgia Tech	13	Alabama	0
10	October 14, 1922	Atlanta, GA	Georgia Tech	33	Alabama	7
11	November 3, 1923	Atlanta, GA	Tie	0	Tie	0
12	October 25, 1924	Atlanta, GA	Alabama	14	Georgia Tech	0
13	October 24, 1925	Atlanta, GA	Alabama	7	Georgia Tech	0
14	October 16, 1926	Atlanta, GA	Alabama	21	Georgia Tech	0
15	October 15, 1927	Atlanta, GA	Georgia Tech	13	Alabama	0
16	November 17, 1928	Atlanta, GA	Georgia Tech	33	Alabama	13
17	November 16, 1929	Atlanta, GA	Alabama	14	Georgia Tech	0
18	November 12, 1932	Atlanta, GA	Georgia Tech	6	Alabama	0
19	November 18, 1933	Atlanta, GA	Alabama	12	Georgia Tech	9
20	November 17, 1934	Atlanta, GA	Alabama	40	Georgia Tech	0
21	November 16, 1935	Birmingham, AL	Alabama	38	Georgia Tech	7
22	November 14, 1936	Atlanta, GA	#4 Alabama	20	Georgia Tech	16
23	November 13, 1937	Birmingham, AL	#3 Alabama	7	Georgia Tech	0
24	November 12, 1938	Atlanta, GA	Tie	14	Tie	14
25	November 18, 1939	Birmingham, AL	Georgia Tech	6	Alabama	0
26	November 16, 1940	Atlanta, GA	#14 Alabama	14	Georgia Tech	13
27	November 15, 1941	Birmingham, AL	#9 Alabama	20	Georgia Tech	0

No.	Date	Location	Winning team		Losing team	
28	November 14, 1942	Atlanta, GA	#2 Georgia Tech	7	#5 Alabama	0
29	November 15, 1947	Birmingham, AL	#14 Alabama	14	#6 Georgia Tech	7
30	November 13, 1948	Atlanta, GA	Alabama	14	#11 Georgia Tech	12
31	November 12, 1949	Birmingham, AL	Alabama	20	Georgia Tech	7
32	November 18, 1950	Atlanta, GA	Alabama	54	Georgia Tech	19
33	November 17, 1951	Birmingham, AL	#7 Georgia Tech	27	Alabama	7
34	November 15, 1952	Atlanta, GA	#2 Georgia Tech	7	#12 Alabama	3
35	November 14, 1953	Birmingham, AL	Alabama	13	#5 Georgia Tech	6
36	November 13, 1954	Atlanta, GA	Georgia Tech	20	Alabama	0
37	November 12, 1955	Birmingham, AL	#11 Georgia Tech	26	Alabama	2
38	November 17, 1956	Atlanta, GA	#4 Georgia Tech	27	Alabama	0
39	November 16, 1957	Birmingham, AL	Georgia Tech	10	Alabama	7
40	November 15, 1958	Atlanta, GA	Alabama	17	#20 Georgia Tech	8
41	November 14, 1959	Birmingham, AL	Alabama	9	#15 Georgia Tech	7
42	November 12, 1960	Atlanta, GA	Alabama	16	Georgia Tech	15
43	November 18, 1961	Birmingham, AL	#2 Alabama	10	Georgia Tech	0
44	November 17, 1962	Atlanta, GA	Georgia Tech	7	#1 Alabama	6
45	November 16, 1963	Birmingham, AL	#7 Alabama	27	Georgia Tech	11
46	November 14, 1964	Atlanta, GA	#2 Alabama	24	#10 Georgia Tech	7
47	September 8, 1979	Atlanta, GA	#2 Alabama	30	Georgia Tech	6
48	September 6, 1980	Birmingham, AL	#2 Alabama	26	Georgia Tech	3
49	September 12, 1981	Birmingham, AL	Georgia Tech	24	#2 Alabama	21
50	September 11, 1982	Atlanta, GA	#4 Alabama	45	Georgia Tech	7
51	September 10, 1983	Birmingham, AL	#14 Alabama	26	Georgia Tech	3
52	September 15, 1984	Atlanta, GA	Georgia Tech	16	#19 Alabama	6
53	August 31, 2030	Atlanta, GA				
Series: Alabama leads 28–21–3

== See also ==
- List of NCAA college football rivalry games
