= Battle for the Rag =

American college football rivalry

- LSU Tigers Tulane Green Wave
- Sport: Football
- First meeting: November 25, 1893; Tulane, 34–0
- Latest meeting: October 31, 2009; LSU, 42–0
- Next meeting: August 31, 2030
- Trophy: Tiger Rag/Victory Flag

Statistics
- Total meetings: 98
- All-time series: LSU leads, 69–22–7 (.740)
- Largest victory: LSU, 62–0 (1958)
- Longest win streak: LSU, 18 (1983–present)
- Current win streak: LSU, 18 (1983–present)

Locations of LSU and Tulane

The Battle for the Rag is the name given to the LSU–Tulane football rivalry. It is an American college football rivalry game played by the LSU Tigers football team of Louisiana State University and the Tulane Green Wave football team of Tulane University. The game was played nearly every year since its inception in 1893, with the last of ninety-eight games being played in 2009. Tulane and LSU spent much of their athletic histories as members of the same conference: the SIAA from 1899 to 1920, the Southern Conference from 1922 to 1932, and as charter members of the SEC from 1932 to 1966.

== The "Rag" ==
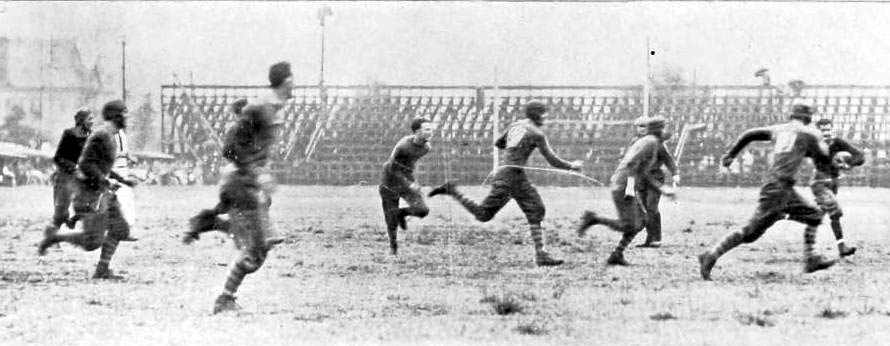
The 1914 0–0 tie between the teams

The winner is awarded a satin trophy flag known as the Tiger Rag at LSU and the Victory Flag at Tulane. The flag is divided diagonally, with the logos of each school placed on opposite sides and the Seal of Louisiana in the center. LSU's name for the flag comes from the popular tune "Tiger Rag", one of the songs performed by the Louisiana State University Tiger Marching Band.

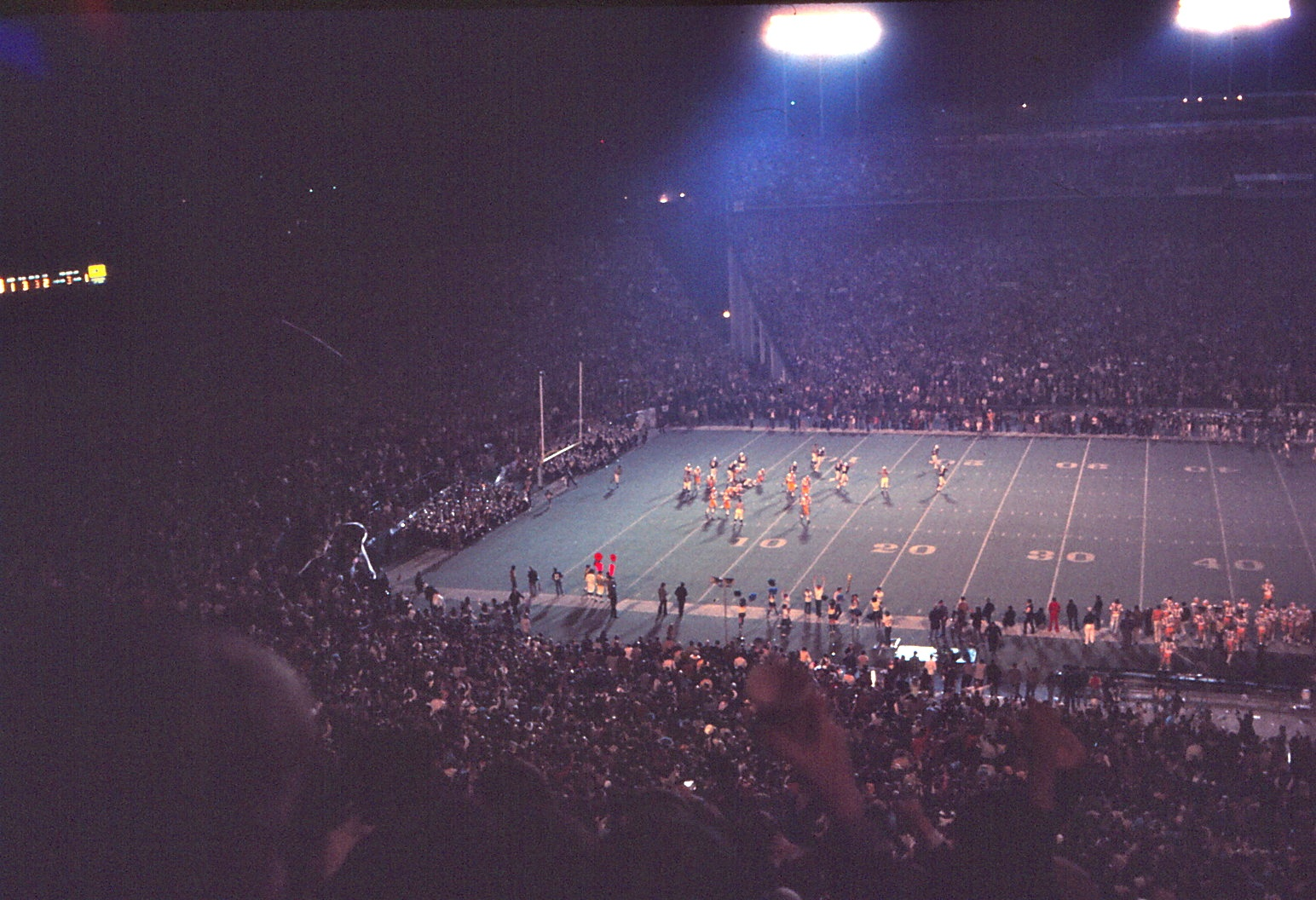
The December 1973 matchup at Tulane Stadium

The original flag was created in 1940 to foster good sportsmanship, most likely in response to growing tension between fans of the two teams that eventually escalated into a riot after Tulane's victory in 1938. It is believed that this flag was destroyed in a 1982 fire at Tulane's University Center.

The 1963 game was only one of 5 across the country not to be canceled or postponed due to the assassination of President John F. Kennedy the day before.

In 2001, LSU and Tulane worked together to create a reconstruction of the rag based upon archived photographs.

== 2006 series renewal ==
In 2006 the rivalry was officially renewed, returning to yearly play for the first time since 1994. The teams began play that year and continued until 2009, when it was announced that LSU would pay Tulane $700,000 to void the final six years of the home-and-home series. LSU held that it would benefit if the remaining games were all played in Baton Rouge. Not wanting to give up its home games, Tulane agreed to end the series early, though the teams did agree to play one future game in New Orleans, a game that LSU has thus far refused to actually play.

== 2030 football renewal ==
After not meeting in a football matchup for 17 years, in July 2026 it was announced an LSU–Tulane game would be played in Baton Rouge on August 31, 2030. On the one-off renewal of the rivalry, Tulane AD David Harris stated Tulane "look[s] forward to continuing conversations about future scheduling opportunities" with LSU.

== Game results ==
LSU victories	Tulane victories	Tie games

No.	Date	Location	Winner	Score
1	November 25, 1893	New Orleans	Tulane	34–0
2	October 26, 1895	Baton Rouge	LSU	8–4
3	October 24, 1896†	New Orleans	LSU	6–0
4	December 17, 1898	Baton Rouge	LSU	37–0
5	December 8, 1899	Baton Rouge	LSU	38–0
6	November 17, 1900	New Orleans	Tulane	29–0
7	November 16, 1901†	New Orleans	LSU	11–0
8	November 19, 1904	New Orleans	Tulane	5–0
9	November 25, 1905	New Orleans	LSU	5–0
10	December 9, 1911	Baton Rouge	LSU	6–0
11	November 28, 1912	New Orleans	LSU	21–3
12	November 22, 1913	Baton Rouge	LSU	40–0
13	November 26, 1914	New Orleans	Tie	0–0
14	November 25, 1915	Baton Rouge	LSU	12–0
15	November 30, 1916	New Orleans	Tie	14–14
16	November 29, 1917	Baton Rouge	Tulane	28–6
17	November 22, 1919	New Orleans	LSU	27–6
18	November 25, 1920	Baton Rouge	Tulane	21–0
19	November 19, 1921	New Orleans	Tulane	21–0
20	November 30, 1922	Baton Rouge	LSU	25–14
21	November 24, 1923	New Orleans	Tulane	20–0
22	November 27, 1924	Baton Rouge	Tulane	13–0
23	November 21, 1925	Baton Rouge	Tulane	16–0
24	November 25, 1926	New Orleans	LSU	7–0
25	November 24, 1927	Baton Rouge	Tulane	13–6
26	November 29, 1928	New Orleans	Tie	0–0
27	November 28, 1929	Baton Rouge	Tulane	21–0
28	November 27, 1930	New Orleans	Tulane	12–7
29	November 28, 1931	New Orleans	Tulane	34–7
30	November 26, 1932	Baton Rouge	LSU	14–0
31	December 2, 1933	New Orleans	Tie	7–7
32	December 1, 1934	Baton Rouge	Tulane	13–12
33	November 30, 1935	New Orleans	LSU	41–0
34	November 28, 1936	Baton Rouge	#2 LSU	33–0
35	November 27, 1937	New Orleans	#10 LSU	20–7
36	November 26, 1938	Baton Rouge	Tulane	14–0
37	December 2, 1939	New Orleans	#5 Tulane	33–20
38	November 30, 1940	Baton Rouge	LSU	14–0
39	November 29, 1941	New Orleans	LSU	19–0
40	November 26, 1942	Baton Rouge	LSU	18–6
41	November 20, 1943	New Orleans	Tulane	27–0
42	November 30, 1944	Baton Rouge	LSU	25–6
43	December 1, 1945	New Orleans	LSU	33–0
44	November 30, 1946	Baton Rouge	#9 LSU	41–27
45	December 6, 1947	New Orleans	Tie	6–6
46	November 27, 1948	Baton Rouge	#14 Tulane	46–0
47	November 26, 1949	New Orleans	#13 LSU	21–0
48	December 2, 1950	New Orleans	Tie	14–14
49	December 1, 1951	New Orleans	LSU	14–13
50	November 29, 1952	New Orleans	LSU	16–0

No.	Date	Location	Winner	Score
51	November 28, 1953	Baton Rouge	LSU	32–13
52	November 27, 1954	New Orleans	LSU	14–13
53	November 26, 1955	Baton Rouge	Tie	13–13
54	December 1, 1956	New Orleans	LSU	7–6
55	November 30, 1957	Baton Rouge	LSU	25–6
56	November 22, 1958	New Orleans	#1 LSU	62–0
57	November 21, 1959	Baton Rouge	#3 LSU	14–6
58	November 26, 1960	New Orleans	LSU	17–6
59	November 25, 1961	Baton Rouge	#4 LSU	62–0
60	November 24, 1962	New Orleans	#8 LSU	38–3
61	November 23, 1963	Baton Rouge	LSU	20–0
62	November 21, 1964	New Orleans	#8 LSU	13–3
63	November 20, 1965	Baton Rouge	LSU	62–0
64	November 19, 1966	New Orleans	LSU	21–7
65	November 25, 1967	Baton Rouge	LSU	41–27
66	November 23, 1968	New Orleans	LSU	34–10
67	November 22, 1969	Baton Rouge	#10 LSU	27–0
68	November 28, 1970	New Orleans	#6 LSU	26–14
69	November 27, 1971	Baton Rouge	#10 LSU	36–7
70	December 2, 1972	New Orleans	#11 LSU	9–3
71	December 1, 1973	New Orleans	Tulane	14–0
72	November 23, 1974	Baton Rouge	LSU	24–22
73	November 22, 1975	New Orleans	LSU	42–6
74	November 20, 1976	Baton Rouge	LSU	17–7
75	November 19, 1977	New Orleans	LSU	20–17
76	November 25, 1978	Baton Rouge	LSU	40–21
77	November 24, 1979	New Orleans	#18 Tulane	24–13
78	November 22, 1980	Baton Rouge	LSU	24–7
79	November 28, 1981	New Orleans	Tulane	48–7
80	November 27, 1982	Baton Rouge	Tulane	31–28
81	November 24, 1983	New Orleans	LSU	20–7
82	November 24, 1984	Baton Rouge	#16 LSU	33–15
83	November 30, 1985	New Orleans	#13 LSU	31–19
84	November 29, 1986	Baton Rouge	#5 LSU	37–17
85	November 21, 1987	New Orleans	#9 LSU	41–36
86	November 26, 1988	Baton Rouge	#16 LSU	44–14
87	November 25, 1989	New Orleans	LSU	27–7
88	November 24, 1990	Baton Rouge	LSU	16–13
89	November 23, 1991	New Orleans	LSU	39–20
90	November 21, 1992	Baton Rouge	LSU	24–12
91	November 20, 1993	Baton Rouge	LSU	24–10
92	November 19, 1994	New Orleans	LSU	49–25
93	November 23, 1996	Baton Rouge	#18 LSU	35–17
94	September 1, 2001	Baton Rouge	#14 LSU	48–17
95	September 23, 2006	Baton Rouge	#10 LSU	49–7
96	September 29, 2007	New Orleans	#2 LSU	34–9
97	November 1, 2008	Baton Rouge	#15 LSU	35–10
98	October 31, 2009	Baton Rouge	#9 LSU	42–0
99	August 30, 2030	Baton Rouge		
Series: LSU leads 69–22–7

^{†} LSU was declared the winner by forfeit in the 1896 and 1901 games. The score for each game prior to a forfeit declaration was: 1896-Tulane 2, LSU 0, and 1901-Tulane 22, LSU 0. Official scores subsequent to the forfeitures are listed in the table.
^{#} Rankings are from the AP Poll released prior to each game.

== See also ==
- List of NCAA college football rivalry games
