= List of Alabama Crimson Tide football All-Americans =

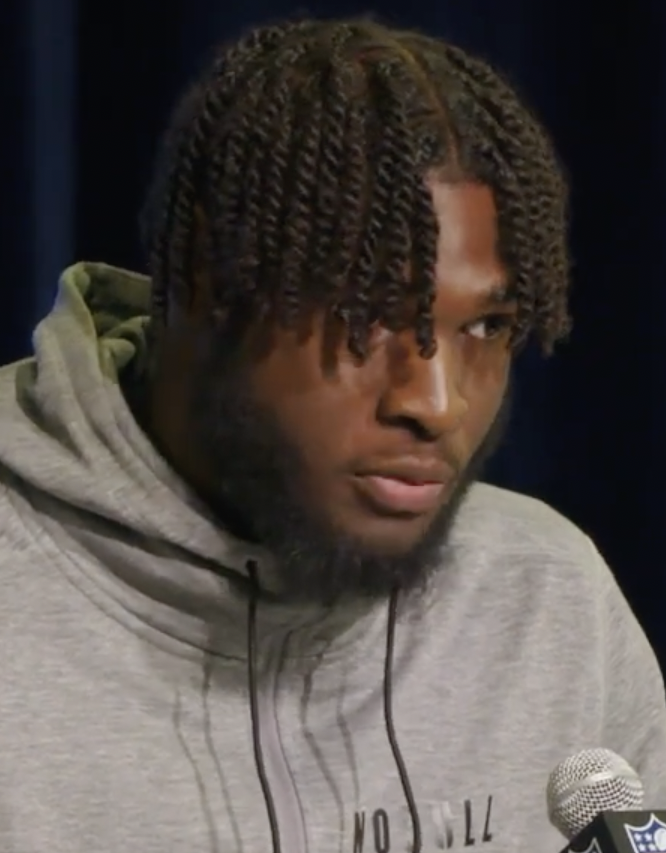
Outside linebacker Will Anderson Jr. was named an unamanious All-American for both 2021 and 2022 seasons

The Alabama Crimson Tide college football team competes as part of the National Collegiate Athletic Association (NCAA) Division I Football Bowl Subdivision (FBS), and represents the University of Alabama in the Western Division of the Southeastern Conference (SEC). All-America selections are individual player recognitions made after each season when numerous publications release lists of their ideal team. The NCAA recognizes five All-America lists: the Associated Press (AP), American Football Coaches Association (AFCA), the Football Writers Association of America (FWAA), Sporting News (TSN), and the Walter Camp Football Foundation (WC). In order for an honoree to earn a "consensus" selection, he must be selected as first team in three of the five lists recognized by the NCAA, and "unanimous" selections must be selected as first team in all five lists.

Since the establishment of the team in 1892, Alabama has had 150 players honored a total of 174 times as First Team All-America for their performance on the field of play. Included in these selections are 85 consensus selections, 41 of which were unanimous selections. In 2009, Alabama set both a school and national record for AP All-Americans with six first team selections. The most recent All-American from Alabama came after the 2025 season, when Kadyn Proctor, was named first-team All-America by various selectors.

Alabama had six players earn first team All-America honors from the WCFF in 2020, the most in the history of Walter Camp voting.

Alabama's 2020 roster features seven first team All-Americans to tie the 2011 roster for the most first-teamers in a single season in program history. The five unanimous selections are the most in program history, surpassing the previous high of three by the 2016 squad. That total also matches the NCAA single-season mark by one team, tying the 2003 Oklahoma roster.

== Key ==
^{†}	Consensus selection
^{‡}	Unanimous selection

=== Selectors ===
AAB	All-America Board	AFCA	American Football Coaches of America	AP	Associated Press		
CO	Collier's Weekly	CNNSI	CNN/Sports Illustrated	CP	Central Press Association	CSW	College Sports Writers
DW	Davis J. Walsh	ES	Ed Sullivan	FN	The Football News	FWAA	Football Writers Association of America
INS	International News Service	KCS	Kansas City Star	LAT	Los Angeles Times	LIB	Liberty Magazine
LK	Look magazine	NANA	North American Newspaper Alliance	NB	Norman E. Brown	NEA	Newspaper Editors Association
NL	Navy Log	NYEP	New York Evening Post	NYS	New York Sun	OF	Oscar Fraley
PD	Parke H. Davis	SH	Scripps-Howard	Time	Time Magazine	TSN	The Sporting News
UP	United Press	UPI	United Press International	WC	Walter Camp	WD	Walter Dobbins

== Selections ==
List of All-Americans showing the year won, player, position and selectors (Note: Statistics correct as of 2024 NCAA Division I FBS football season.)
Year	Player name	Position	Selector(s)
1915	William T. Van de Graaff	T	WC-2; PD-1
1925	Allison Hubert	QB	NB-2
1926	Fred Pickhard	T	BE-2
1926	Hoyt "Wu" Winslett	End	AP-1; INS-1; NEA; AAB-2; CP-2; NYS-2; BE-1; DW-1; ES-2
1929	Tony Holm	FB	AP-1; INS-2
1929	Fred Sington	T	AP-3; UP-2; INS-2; NYP-1; DW-2
1930	Fred Sington‡	T	AP-1; AAB; COL-1; INS-1; NANA; NEA-1; UP-1; CP-1; NYEP-1; NYS-1; LAT
1930	John Suther	HB	AP-3; UP-3; INS-2; CP-1; NYEP-1
1931	Johnny Cain	FB	AAB; UP-1; NEA-3; INS-3; WC; CH-2
1932	Johnny Cain	FB	INS-2
1933	Thomas Hupke	G	AP-2; UP-2; CO-3; NANA-3; NEA-2; INS-3; CP-1; WD-2
1934	Millard "Dixie" Howell†	HB	AAB [QB]; UP-1; NEA-1; INS-1; LIB-1; NANA-1; CP-1; AP-2; WC-1; CSW-2
1934	Don Hutson†	End	AAB; AP-1; UP-1; INS-1; LIB-1; NANA-2; NYS-1; WC-1; CSW-2
1934	Bill Lee†	T	AP-1; COL; LIB-1; NANA-1; TSN
1935	Riley Smith†	QB	AP-1; AAB-1; COL-1; NEA-1; INS-1; UP-2; LIB-2; NANA-2; CP-2; NYS-1; WC-1; KCS-2
1936	James L. Nesbit	FB	CP-1
1936	Art White	G	AP-2; CP-1
1937	Joe Kilgrow	HB	INS-1; TSN; UP-2; CP-2
1937	Leroy Monsky†	G	AP-1; UP-2; COL-1; INS-2; CP-2; WC-1
1937	James Ryba	T	INS-3; CP-1
1939	Cary Cox	C	CP-2
1941	Holt Rast†	End	AP-2; UP-1; INS-1; NEA-2; AAB-1; CP-1; WC-1
1942	Joe Domnanovich†	C	AP-1; UP-2; TSN-1; INS-2; CP-1; CO-1; LK-1; NYS-1; WC-1
1942	Don Whitmire	T	AP-3; SN-3; NEA-1
1945	Harry Gilmer	QB	AP-2; UP-2; FWAA-2; TSN; CO-1; CP-2; INS-2; LK; NYS; OF-1; NL
1945	Vaughn Mancha†	C	AP-1; UP-1; FWAA-1; SN; COL-1; CP-1; INS-1; NYS; OF-1
1950	Ed Salem	DB	AP-1
1952	Bobby Marlow	Back	AP-2
1954	George Mason	Tackle	
1954	Corky Tharp	HB	INS-2
1961	Billy Neighbors‡	T	AP, UPI, NEA, CP, WC, AFCA, FWAA, TSN
1962	Lee Roy Jordan‡	LB	AP, UPI, NEA, WC, AFCA, FWAA, TSN, Time
1964	Wayne Freeman	G	NEA
1964	Dan Kearley	T	AP
1964	Joe Namath	QB	AP
1964	David Ray	K	FN
1965	Paul Crane†	C	AP, UPI, NEA, WC, AFCA, FWAA
1965	Steve Sloan	QB	AP
1966	Richard Cole	OG	
1966	Cecil Dowdy‡	OT	AP, UPI, NEA, CP, WC, AFCA, FWAA
1966	Bobby Johns	DB	CP
1966	Ray Perkins†	WR	AP, NEA, WC, AFCA, FWAA
1967	Dennis Homan†	WR	AP, UPI, CP, WC, AFCA, FWAA, TSN
1967	Bobby Johns†	DB	WC, AFCA
1967	Ken Stabler	QB	CP-2, NEA-2, FN
1968	Sam Gellerstedt	DG	
1968	Mike Hall	LB	AP-2, CP-1, NEA-2, WC
1969	Alvin Samples	OG	FN
1970	Johnny Musso	RB	WC, FN
1971	John Hannah	OT	AFCA
1971	Johnny Musso†	RB	UPI, WC, AFCA, FWAA, FN
1972	John Hannah‡	OG	AP, UPI, NEA, WC, AFCA, FWAA, TSN, Time, FN
1972	Jim Krapf	C	AFCA
1972	John Mitchell	LB	AFCA
1973	Buddy Brown†	OG	AP, UPI, NEA, AFCA, FWAA
1973	Woodrow Lowe	LB	NEA, FWAA
1973	Wayne Wheeler	WR	WC, TSN, FN
1974	Leroy Cook†	DE	AP, FWAA
1974	Sylvester Croom	C	AFCA
1974	Woodrow Lowe†	LB	UPI, WC, FN
1974	Mike Washington	CB	NEA, FN, Time
1975	Leroy Cook‡	DE	AP, UPI, WC, AFCA, FWAA, FN
1975	Woodrow Lowe	LB	UPI
1977	Ozzie Newsome†	WR	AP, NEA, WC, AFCA, FWAA, TSN, FN
1978	Barry Krauss	LB	TSN
1978	Marty Lyons†	DT	AP, NEA, FWAA, TSN
1979	Jim Bunch†	OG	AP, AFCA, FWAA
1979	Don McNeal	DB	NEA, TSN
1979	Dwight Stephenson	C	
1980	Tom Boyd	LB	WC
1980	E. J. Junior‡	DE	AP, UPI, NEA, WC, AFCA, FWAA, TSN
1981	Tom Boyd	LB	NEA, WC
1981	Tommy Wilcox†	DB	AP, UPI, WC, AFCA
1982	Jeremiah Castille	DB	AFCA
1982	Mike Pitts†	DT	UPI, AFCA, FWAA, TSN
1982	Tommy Wilcox	DB	WC
1984	Cornelius Bennett	LB	TSN
1985	Cornelius Bennett	LB	WC, TSN
1985	Jon Hand	DT	TSN
1986	Cornelius Bennett‡	DE	AP, UPI, NEA, WC, AFCA, FWAA, SH, TSN
1986	Van Tiffin	K	SH
1987	Bobby Humphrey	RB	WC, TSN
1988	Kermit Kendrick	S	
1988	Larry Rose	OG	
1988	Derrick Thomas‡	LB	AP, UPI, WC, AFCA, FWAA, TSN
1989	Keith McCants‡	LB	AP, UPI, WC, AFCA, FWAA, FN, TSN
1989	John Mangum	DB	FN
1990	Philip Doyle‡	K	AP, UPI, NEA, WC, AFCA, FWAA, SH, TSN, FN
1991	Robert Stewart	NT	UPI, NEA, TSN
1992	John Copeland†	DE	AP, WC, AFCA, FWAA, SH, TSN, FN
1992	Eric Curry†	DE	AP, UPI, NEA, WC, AFCA, SH, TSN
1992	Antonio Langham	CB	
1993	Antonio Langham‡	CB	AP, UPI, WC, AFCA, FWAA, SH, TSN, FN
1993	David Palmer†	KS	AP, UPI, WC, AFCA, FWAA, TSN
1993	Michael Procter	K	FN
1994	Michael Procter	K	AFCA
1996	Kevin Jackson‡	S	AP, AFCA, FWAA, WC, TSN, FN
1996	Michael Myers	DE	TSN
1996	Dwayne Rudd	LB	AFCA
1999	Shaun Alexander	RB	AFCA, CNNSI
1999	Chris Samuels‡	OT	AFCA, AP, FWAA, TSN, WC, PFW, FN, CNNSI
2005	DeMeco Ryans‡	LB	AP, AFCA, FWAA, WC, TSN, ESPN, CBS, Rivals
2008	Antoine Caldwell†	C	AFCA, AP, TSN, SI
2008	Terrence Cody†	DT	AFCA, AP, FWAA, TSN, SI, Rivals.com, CBS
2008	Rashad Johnson	S	AFCA, Rivals.com
2008	Andre Smith‡	OT	AFCA, AP, FWAA, TSN, WC, ESPN, FN, SI, CBS, Rivals.com
2009	Javier Arenas†	CB	AFCA, AP, SI
2009	Javier Arenas	PR	CBS, Rivals.com
2009	Terrence Cody†	DT	AP, FWAA, WC, CBS
2009	Mark Ingram II‡	RB	AP, FWAA, AFCA, WC, TSN, SI, ESPN, CBS, Rivals.com
2009	Mike Johnson†	OG	AP, AFCA, WC, TSN, SI, ESPN, CBS, Rivals.com
2009	Rolando McClain‡	LB	AP, FWAA, AFCA, WC, TSN, SI, ESPN, CBS, Rivals.com
2009	Leigh Tiffin	K	AP, CBS
2010	Mark Barron	S	FWAA
2011	Mark Barron‡	S	AFCA, AP, FWAA, WC, TSN, CBS, ESPN, PFW, Scout.com, SI
2011	Dont'a Hightower†	LB	AFCA, AP, WC, PFW
2011	Barrett Jones‡	T	AP, AFCA, FWAA, WC, CBS, ESPN, Scout.com, TSN
2011	Dre Kirkpatrick	CB	FWAA, CBS, PFW
2011	DeQuan Menzie	CB	AFCA
2011	Trent Richardson‡	RB	AP, AFCA, FWAA, WCFF, CBS, ESPN, Scout.com, TSN
2011	Courtney Upshaw	LB	FWAA, TSN, CBS, ESPN, PFW, Scout.com, SI
2012	D. J. Fluker	OT	CBS, Scout.com
2012	Barrett Jones†	C	WCFF, AP, FWAA, TSN, CBS, Scout.com, ESPN, SI
2012	Dee Milliner‡	CB	WCFF, AFCA, AP, FWAA, TSN, CBS, Scout.com, ESPN, PFW
2012	C. J. Mosley†	LB	WCFF, AFCA, AP, TSN, CBS, Scout.com, SI
2012	Chance Warmack‡	OG	WCFF, AFCA, AP, TSN, FWAA, CBS, Scout.com, ESPN, SI, PFW
2013	Ha Ha Clinton-Dix†	S	AFCA, FWAA, TSN, ESPN
2013	Cyrus Kouandjio†	OT	AFCA, FWAA, WCFF, AP, CBS, Athlon
2013	A. J. McCarron	QB	AFCA, WCFF
2013	C. J. Mosley‡	LB	AFCA, FWAA, TSN, WCFF, AP, USAT, CBS, ESPN, Athlon
2014	Amari Cooper‡	WR	AP, WCFF, TSN, AFCA, FWAA, USAT, CBS, ESPN, Scout, SI
2014	Landon Collins‡	S	AP, WCFF, TSN, AFCA, FWAA, CBS, ESPN, Scout, SI
2014	Trey DePriest	LB	AFCA
2014	Arie Kouandjio	OG	AFCA, USAT, SI
2014	J. K. Scott	P	TSN, USAT, ESPN, SI
2015	Derrick Henry‡	RB	AP, WCFF, FWAA, AFCA, TSN, USAT, CBS, SI, ESPN, FOX
2015	Reggie Ragland‡	LB	AP, WCFF, FWAA, AFCA, TSN, USAT, CBS, SI, ESPN
2015	Ryan Kelly†	C	WCFF, FWAA, AFCA, TSN, USAT, ESPN
2015	A'Shawn Robinson†	DT	AP, FWAA, AFCA, TSN, CBS, SI, FOX
2016	Jonathan Allen‡	DE	AFCA, FWAA, AP, WCFF, TSN, SI, USAT, ESPN, FOX, CBS
2016	Minkah Fitzpatrick†	DB	AFCA, AP, ESPN
2016	Reuben Foster‡	LB	AFCA, FWAA, AP, WCFF, TSN, SI, USAT, ESPN, FOX, CBS
2016	O. J. Howard	TE	FOX
2016	Marlon Humphrey	DB	FWAA
2016	Cam Robinson‡	OT	AFCA, FWAA, AP, WCFF, TSN, SI, ESPN, FOX, CBS, Athlon
2017	Rashaan Evans	LB	AFCA
2017	Minkah Fitzpatrick‡	DB	AP, AFCA, FWAA, WCFF, TSN, SI, USAT, ESPN, CBS, CFN
2017	J. K. Scott	P	CFN
2018	Tua Tagovailoa†	QB	AFCA, TSN, WCFF, Athlon
2018	Jerry Jeudy†	WR	AFCA, AP, TSN, WCFF, SI, ESPN, CBS, Athlon
2018	Ross Pierschbacher	C	TSN
2018	Jonah Williams‡	OT	AFCA, AP, FWAA, TSN, WCFF, SI, USAT, CFN, ESPN, CBS, Athlon
2018	Quinnen Williams‡	DT	AFCA, AP, FWAA, TSN, WCFF, SI, USAT, CFN, ESPN, CBS, Athlon
2018	Deionte Thompson†	DB	AFCA, AP, TSN, SI, USAT, CFN, ESPN, CBS, Athlon
2019	Jerry Jeudy	WR	AFCA
2019	Alex Leatherwood	OT	AFCA
2019	Jedrick Wills	OT	Athletic, CBS, USAT
2019	Xavier McKinney	S	ESPN, USAT
2019	Jaylen Waddle	PR	FWAA, TSN, SI, USAT, CBS
2020	Christian Barmore	DT	CBS
2020	Landon Dickerson‡	C	AFCA, AP, CBS, ESPN, FWAA, Phil Steele, TSN, WCFF
2020	Mac Jones†	QB	AFCA, AP, Athletic, ESPN, TSN, USAT, WCFF
2020	Najee Harris‡	RB	AFCA, AP, CBS, ESPN, FWAA, Phil Steele, TSN, WCFF
2020	Alex Leatherwood‡	OT	AFCA, AP, Athletic, CBS, ESPN, FWAA, Phil Steele, TSN, USAT, WCFF
2020	Dylan Moses	LB	AFCA
2020	Will Reichard	PK	CBS
2020	DeVonta Smith‡	WR	AFCA, AP, Athletic, CBS, ESPN, FWAA, Phil Steele, TSN, USAT, WCFF
2020	Patrick Surtain II‡	CB	AFCA, AP, Athletic, CBS, ESPN, FWAA, Phil Steele, TSN, USAT, WCFF
2021	Will Anderson Jr. ‡	LB	AFCA, AP, Athletic, CBS, ESPN, FWAA, Phil Steele, TSN, USAT, WCFF
2021	Evan Neal†	OT	AFCA, CBS, ESPN, FWAA, TSN, USAT, WCFF
2021	Jameson Williams	WR	AP, CBS, ESPN, TSN, USAT
2021	Bryce Young †	QB	AP, Athletic, CBS, ESPN, FWAA, TSN, USAT
2022	Will Anderson Jr. ‡	LB	AP, AFCA, Athletic, ESPN, CBS, FWAA, TSN, USAT, WCFF
2022	Brian Branch	S	ESPN
2023	Terrion Arnold	CB	AP, ESPN
2023	Kool-Aid McKinstry	CB	AP, CBS, SI, TSN, USAT
2023	Dallas Turner †	LB	AFCA, AP, Athletic, CBS, ESPN, FWAA, TSN, USAT
2024	Tyler Booker	OG	CBS, ESPN, USAT
2024	Malachi Moore	DB	PFF
2025	Kadyn Proctor†	OT	AFCA, FWAA, WCFF
