= 1949 Alabama Crimson Tide football team =

American college football season

1949 Alabama Crimson Tide football
- Conference: Southeastern Conference
- Record: 6–3–1 (4–3–1 SEC)
- Head coach: Harold Drew (3rd season)
- Captain: Doug Lockridge
- Home stadium: Denny Stadium; Legion Field; Ladd Stadium

1949 Southeastern Conference football standings
	Conf.					Overall
Team	W		L		T	W		L		T
Tulane $	5	–	1	–	0	7	–	2	–	1
No. 11 Kentucky	4	–	1	–	0	9	–	3	–	0
No. 17 Tennessee	4	–	1	–	1	7	–	2	–	1
Georgia Tech	5	–	2	–	0	7	–	3	–	0
No. 9 LSU	4	–	2	–	0	8	–	3	–	0
Alabama	4	–	3	–	1	6	–	3	–	1
Vanderbilt	4	–	4	–	0	5	–	5	–	0
Auburn	2	–	4	–	2	2	–	4	–	3
Ole Miss	2	–	4	–	0	4	–	5	–	1
Florida	1	–	4	–	1	4	–	5	–	1
Georgia	1	–	4	–	1	4	–	6	–	1
Mississippi State	0	–	6	–	0	0	–	8	–	1
$ – Conference champion; Rankings from AP Poll

The 1949 Alabama Crimson Tide football team (variously "Alabama", "UA" or "Bama") represented the University of Alabama in the 1949 college football season. It was the Crimson Tide's 55th overall and 16th season as a member of the Southeastern Conference (SEC). The team was led by head coach Harold Drew, in his third year, and played their home games at Denny Stadium in Tuscaloosa, Legion Field in Birmingham and Ladd Stadium in Mobile, Alabama. They finished with a record of six wins, three losses and one tie (6–3–1 overall, 4–3–1 in the SEC).

Alabama opened the season with losses against Tulane and at Vanderbilt before they notched their first win of the season against Duquesne at Denny Stadium. A week later, the Crimson Tide played Tennessee to a tie before they won five consecutive games over Mississippi State, Georgia, Georgia Tech, Mississippi Southern and Florida. Alabama then closed their season with a 14–13 loss to Auburn in the Iron Bowl after Ed Salem missed an extra point that would have tied the game with less than two minutes left in the game.

== Schedule ==
Date	Opponent	Site	Result	Attendance
September 24	Tulane	Ladd Stadium; Mobile, AL	L 14–28	37,500
October 1	at Vanderbilt	Dudley Field; Nashville, TN	L 7–14	27,500
October 7	Duquesne*	Denny Stadium; Tuscaloosa, AL	W 48–8	15,000
October 15	Tennessee	Legion Field; Birmingham, AL (Third Saturday in October)	T 7–7	41,000
October 22	Mississippi State^{†}	Denny Stadium; Tuscaloosa, AL (rivalry)	W 35–6	26,000
October 29	at Georgia	Sanford Stadium; Athens, GA (rivalry)	W 14–7	35,000
November 12	Georgia Tech	Legion Field; Birmingham, AL (rivalry)	W 20–7	43,000
November 19	Mississippi Southern*	Denny Stadium; Tuscaloosa, AL	W 34–26	15,000
November 26	at Florida	Florida Field; Gainesville, FL (rivalry)	W 35–13	15,000
December 3	vs. Auburn	Legion Field; Birmingham, AL (Iron Bowl)	L 13–14	44,000
*Non-conference game; ^{†}Homecoming

== Game summaries ==
=== Tulane ===
Team	1	2	3	4	Total
• Tulane	0	7	7	14	28
Alabama	0	0	0	14	14

- Date: September 24
- Location: Ladd Stadium
  Mobile, AL
- Game attendance: 37,500

To open the 1949 season, Alabama traveled to Mobile and were defeated 28–14 by the Tulane Green Wave to open the second consecutive season with a loss. After a scoreless first quarter, Tulane took a 7–0 halftime lead after George Kinek scored on a four-yard touchdown run. The Greenies extended their lead further in the third quarter to 14–0 when Eddie Price scored on an 11-yard run. In the fourth quarter, Bill Svoboda scored a pair of touchdowns on a one-yard run and on an 85-yard kickoff return for Tulane. Alabama scored both of their touchdowns on a pair of passes; the first on a 78-yard pass from Ed Salem to Bill Abston and the second on a 23-yard Butch Avinger pass to Tom Calvin to make the final score 28–14.

=== Vanderbilt ===
Team	1	2	3	4	Total
Alabama	0	7	0	0	7
• Vanderbilt	0	7	0	7	14

- Date: October 1
- Location: Dudley Field
  Nashville, Tennessee
- Game attendance: 27,500

The Crimson Tide lost for the second consecutive week against the Vanderbilt Commodores by a final score of 14–7 at Dudley Field. After a scoreless first quarter, both teams scored second-quarter touchdowns in a span of just one minute to make the halftime score 7–7. The Commodores scored first on a 29-yard Dean Davidson run and the Crimson Tide responded with a nine-yard Ed Salem pass to Tom Calvin. Joe Hicks then scored the game-winning touchdown in the fourth quarter on a one-yard run. Alabama then drove to the Vandy 12-yard line late in the fourth when a fourth down pass went incomplete to preserve the Commodores victory.

=== Duquesne ===
Team	1	2	3	4	Total
Duquesne	0	6	0	2	8
• Alabama	20	14	14	0	48

- Date: October 7
- Location: Denny Stadium
  Tuscaloosa, AL
- Game attendance: 15,000

In their first Tuscaloosa game of the season, Alabama defeated the Duquesne Dukes, for the third consecutive season, by a final score of 48–8 on a Friday evening. The Crimson Tide opened the scoring with three first-quarter touchdowns on a 36-yard Tom Calvin run, a 61-yard James Melton run and on a 20-yard Butch Avinger pass to Al Lary for a 20–0 lead. In the second quarter, Alabama scored first on a one-yard Ralph Cochran run, and then the Dukes responded with their only touchdown of the game on a three-yard Chuck Rapp run to make the score 27–6. The Crimson Tide then scored on the kickoff that ensued when a 101-yard Jim Burkett return made the halftime score 34–6.

Alabama then closed the scoring for the evening with a pair of third-quarter touchdowns. The first came on a 76-yard J. D. Roddam run and the second on a 22-yard Lary run to make the score 48–6. The Dukes then scored the final points of the game in the fourth quarter when Frank Yacina tackled George McCain for a safety to make the final score 48–8.

=== Tennessee ===
Third Saturday in October

Team	1	2	3	4	Total
Tennessee	7	0	0	0	7
Alabama	0	7	0	0	7

- Date: October 15
- Location: Legion Field
  Birmingham, AL
- Game attendance: 41,000

Alabama played the rival Tennessee Volunteers to a 7–7 tie at Legion Field in a driving rainstorm. The only points of the game came on a pair of one-yard touchdown runs in the first half. Bernie Sizemore scored for the Volunteers in the first quarter and James Melton scored for the Crimson Tide in the second quarter.

=== Mississippi State ===
Team	1	2	3	4	Total
Mississippi State	0	0	0	6	6
• Alabama	7	14	7	7	35

- Date: October 22
- Location: Denny Stadium
  Tuscaloosa, AL
- Game attendance: 26,000

On homecoming in Tuscaloosa, the Crimson Tide scored touchdowns in all four quarters and defeated the Mississippi State Maroons 35–6 at Denny Stadium. Lionel W. Noonan scored the initial Alabama touchdown on a two-yard run in the first. In the second, Ed Salem scored on a three-yard run and later threw a 20-yard touchdown pass to Al Lary for a 21–0 halftime lead. The Crimson Tide further extended their lead with touchdown runs of three-yards by J. D. Roddam in the third and of two-yards by Jim Burkett in the fourth to make the score 35–0. The Maroons then ended the shutout attempt with just 0:02 remaining in the game when Max Stainbrook returned an interception 60-yards for a touchdown as time expired to make the final score 35–6.

=== Georgia ===
Team	1	2	3	4	Total
• Alabama	0	7	0	7	14
Georgia	0	7	0	0	7

- Date: October 29
- Location: Sanford Stadium
  Athens, GA
- Game attendance: 35,000

One year after Georgia gave the Crimson Tide their worst defeat since the 1910 season, Alabama upset the Bulldogs 14–7 on homecoming in Athens. In the second quarter, Alabama scored on a one-yard Butch Avinger run and Georgia on a five-yard Floyd Reid run for a halftime score of 7–7. After a scoreless third, the Crimson Tide scored the game-winning touchdown in the fourth quarter on a 25-yard Ed Salem pass to James Melton.

=== Georgia Tech ===
Team	1	2	3	4	Total
Georgia Tech	0	7	0	0	7
• Alabama	0	0	14	6	20

- Date: November 12
- Location: Legion Field
  Birmingham, AL
- Game attendance: 43,000

Before 43,000 fans at Legion Field, Alabama defeated the Georgia Tech Yellow Jackets 20–7 for their third conference victory of the season. After a scoreless first quarter, the Yellow Jackets took a 7–0 halftime lead when George Humphreys threw a 32-yard touchdown pass to Charles Harvin late in the second. Alabama then took the lead with a pair of third-quarter touchdowns scored by Ed Salem on a five-yard run and on a 25-yard Butch Avinger pass to Al Lary. Salem then made the final score 20–7 late in the fourth with his three-yard touchdown run for the Crimson Tide.

=== Mississippi Southern ===
Team	1	2	3	4	Total
Mississippi Southern	0	0	0	26	26
• Alabama	14	13	7	0	34

- Date: November 19
- Location: Denny Stadium
  Tuscaloosa, AL
- Game attendance: 15,000

Although the Golden Eagles scored 26 fourth quarter points, Alabama defeated Mississippi Southern at Denny Stadium 34–26. The Crimson Tide opened the scoring with a pair of first-quarter touchdown passes from Ed Salem to Ed White for a 14–0 lead. In the second quarter, Butch Avinger scored touchdowns on a quarterback sneak and on his five-yard pass to Al Lary for a 27–0 halftime lead. Before Southern scored their 26 fourth quarter points, Bob Cochran threw a 12-yard touchdown pass to Charley Davis to give Alabama a 34–0 lead as they entered the fourth. In the fourth quarter Southern touchdowns were scored by Morris Brown on a four-yard run, a 95-yard Bobby Holmes punt return, a 43-yard Brown run and then on a second Holmes punt return for 85-yards.

=== Florida ===
Team	1	2	3	4	Total
• Alabama	13	9	7	6	35
Florida	7	0	0	6	13

- Date: November 26
- Location: Florida Field
  Gainesville, FL
- Game attendance: 15,000

In their final road game of the season, Alabama defeated the Florida Gators 35–13 for their fifth consecutive win on the season.

=== Auburn ===
Iron Bowl

Team	1	2	3	4	Total
• Auburn	0	7	0	7	14
Alabama	0	7	0	6	13

- Date: December 3
- Location: Legion Field
  Birmingham, AL
- Game attendance: 44,000

In the second meeting since the renewal of the series, Alabama was upset by Auburn 14–13 at Legion Field. After a scoreless first, Auburn took a 7–0 lead in the second quarter when Johnny Wallis intercepted an Ed Salem pass and returned it 19-yards for the touchdown. Alabama responded with just seconds remaining in the half with a 13-yard Salem touchdown run to tie the game 7–7 at halftime. The Tigers retook the lead early in the fourth on a ten-yard George Davis run. The Crimson Tide responded with a three-yard Tom Calvin touchdown run with just under two minutes left in the game. However, Salem missed the extra point to give Auburn the 14–13 victory.

== Personnel ==
=== Varsity letter winners ===
Player	Hometown	Position
Bill Abston	Peterson, Alabama	Halfback
Paul Arthur	Birmingham, Alabama	End
Butch Avinger	Montgomery, Alabama	Quarterback
Jack Brown	Selma, Alabama	Quarterback
Jim Burkett	Dothan, Alabama	Fullback
Billy Cadenhead	Greenville, Mississippi	Halfback
Tom Calvin	Athens, Alabama	Halfback
Bob Cochran	Hueytown, Alabama	Halfback
Ralph Cochran	Hueytown, Alabama	Quarterback
Joe Compton	Sylacauga, Alabama	Fullback
L. B. Couch	Southside, Alabama	Center
Charley Davis	Uniontown, Pennsylvania	Halfback
Jim Franko	Yorkville, Ohio	Guard
Herb Hannah	Athens, Alabama	Guard
Sandy Helms	Tuscaloosa, Alabama	Guard
Ed Holdnak	Kenvil, New Jersey	Guard
Jug Jenkins	Eufaula, Alabama	End
Al Lary	Northport, Alabama	End
Ed Lary	Northport, Alabama	End
Larry Lauer	Wilmette, Illinois	Center
Doug Lockridge	Jasper, Alabama	Center
Harold Lutz	Clinton, Iowa	End
Walter May	Mobile, Alabama	Back
Dave Mayfield	Jacksonville, Florida	Tackle
James Melton	Wetumpka, Alabama	Halfback
Floyd Miller	Oneonta, Alabama	Tackle
Mike Mizerany	Birmingham, Alabama	Guard
Lionel W. Noonan	Mobile, Alabama	Halfback
Pat O'Sullivan	New Orleans, Louisiana	Linebacker
J. D. Roddam	Pinson, Alabama	Halfback
Ed Salem	Birmingham, Alabama	Halfback
Billy Shipp	Mobile, Alabama	Tackle
Jack Smith	Hueytown, Alabama	Guard
Elliott Speed	Selma, Alabama	Center
Rebel Steiner	Birmingham, Alabama	End
Bill Theris	Mobile, Alabama	Tackle
Ed White	Anniston, Alabama	End
Al Wilhite	Tuscumbia, Alabama	Tackle

=== Coaching staff ===
Name	Position	Seasons at Alabama	Alma mater
Harold Drew	Head coach	16	Bates (1916)
Lew Bostick	Assistant coach	6	Alabama (1939)
Tilden Campbell	Assistant coach	10	Alabama (1935)
Ben Enis	Assistant coach	1	Alabama (1927)
Joe Kilgrow	Assistant coach	6	Alabama (1937)
Malcolm Laney	Assistant coach	6	Alabama (1932)
Tom Lieb	Assistant coach	4	Notre Dame (1923)
James Nisbet	Assistant coach	1	Alabama (1937)
