= Rufus Deal =

American football player (1917–2005)

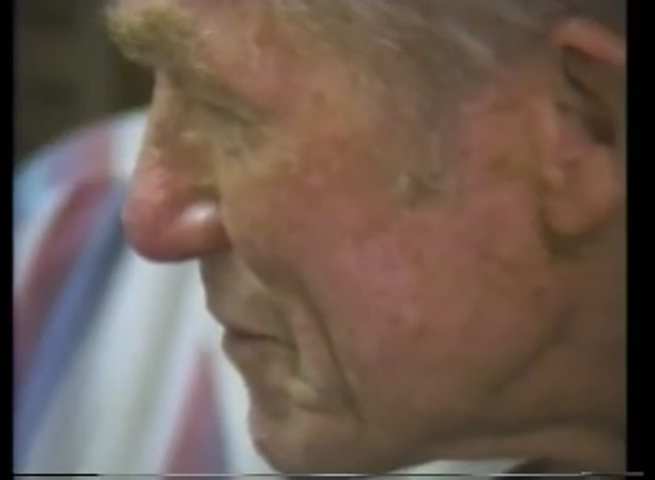
- Deal in 1992

No. 53
- Position: Running back

Personal information
- Born: December 7, 1917; Moundville, Alabama, U.S.
- Died: March 14, 2005 (aged 87); Northport, Alabama, U.S.
- Listed height: 6 ft 0 in (1.83 m)
- Listed weight: 220 lb (100 kg)

Career information
- High school: Tuscaloosa County (Northport)
- College: Auburn (1938-1941)
- NFL draft: 1942: 3rd round, 21st overall pick

Career history
- Washington Redskins (1942)

Awards and highlights
- NFL champion (1942); Pro Bowl (1942)

Career NFL statistics
- Rushing yards: 12
- Rushing average: 2.4
- Stats at Pro Football Reference

Rufus Copeland Deal (December 7, 1917 – March 14, 2005) was an American professional football running back in the National Football League (NFL) for the former Washington Redskins (now the Washington Commanders). He played college football at Auburn University and was selected in the third round of the 1942 NFL draft.

An Alabama native, Copeland attended high school in Tuscaloosa County, Alabama.
