= Bobby Jackson (defensive back) =

American football player (1936–2009)

No. 28, 20, 4
- Position: Safety

Personal information
- Born: January 10, 1936; Geneva, Alabama, U.S.
- Died: October 12, 2009 (aged 73); Mobile, Alabama, U.S.
- Listed height: 6 ft 1 in (1.85 m)
- Listed weight: 190 lb (86 kg)

Career information
- High school: Murphy (Mobile)
- College: Alabama (1955–1958)
- NFL draft: 1959: 7th round, 73rd overall pick

Career history

Playing
- Philadelphia Eagles (1960); Chicago Bears (1961); Tuscaloosa Warriors (1963); Huntsville Rockets (1965)

Coaching
- Tuscaloosa Warriors (1963) Assistant coach

Awards and highlights
- NFL champion (1960)

Career NFL statistics
- Return yards: 5
- Stats at Pro Football Reference

Bobby Gerald Jackson (January 10, 1936 – October 12, 2009) was an American professional football player who was a defensive back for two seasons for the Philadelphia Eagles and Chicago Bears.

== Playing career ==
He was the first starting quarterback for Bear Bryant at Alabama. In his senior season, he played in the Blue-Gray Classic in Montgomery, the Senior Bowl in Mobile and the College All-Star Game.

He was selected by the Packers in the 1959 NFL draft in the seventh round, but was released by the Packers. He was signed by the Philadelphia Eagles as a defensive back for the 1960 season, a season that was the Eagles' first title championship since 1949. After one season with the Bears, he retired, having played 21 games. He also served as a kick returner, with one return for five yards.

== Life after football ==
After retirement, he worked for Shell Oil for 10 years and also worked for WKSJ radio for 23 years, retiring in 2006. He was also active in the Red Elephant Club, NFL Players Association and Mardi Gras Society. He was elected to the Mobile Sports Hall of Fame in 1997.

He died at the age of 73 after multiple years of battling Alzheimer's Disease.

== See also ==
- Alabama Crimson Tide football yearly statistical leaders
