= Tuscaloosa County High School =

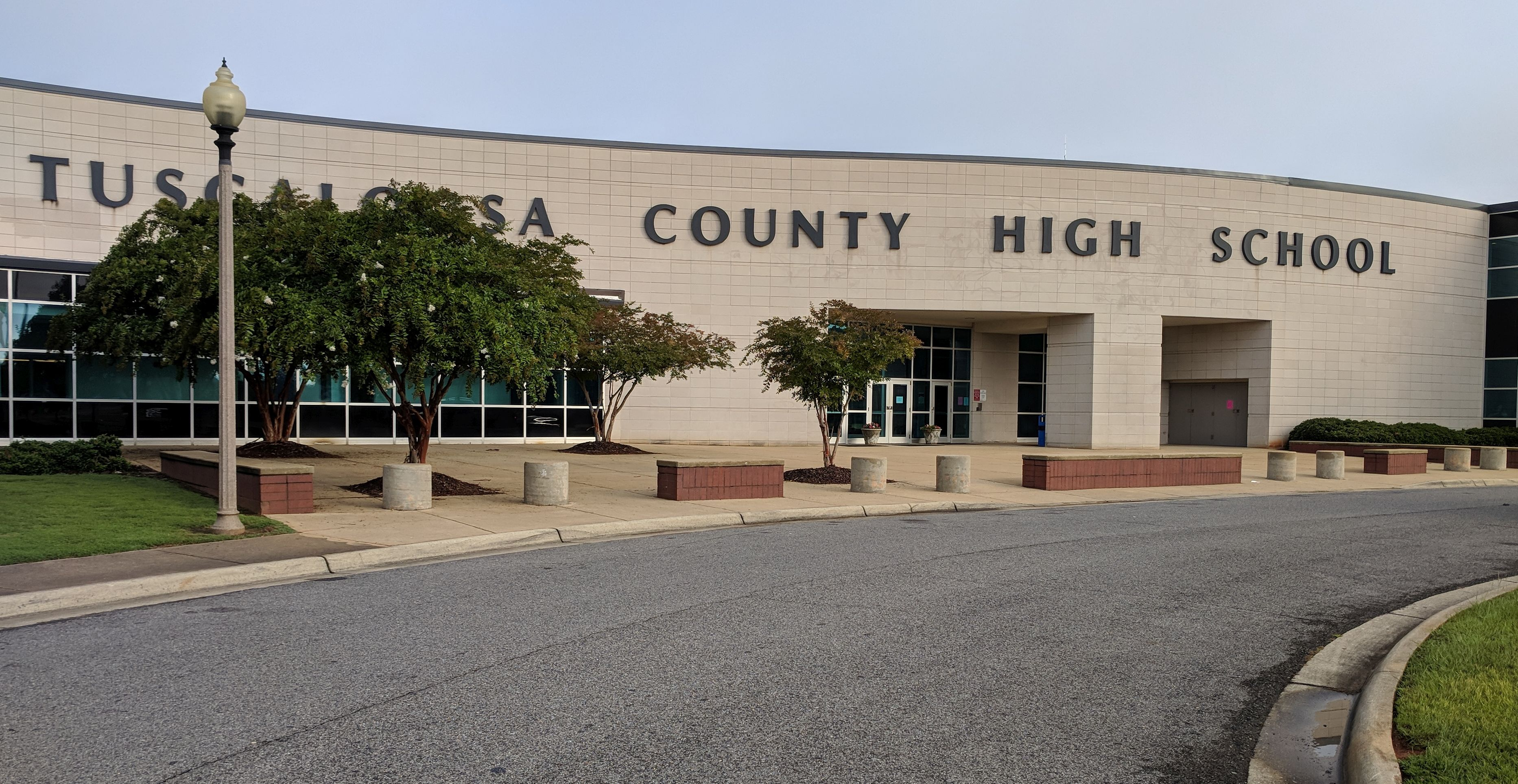

Location
- 12500 Wildcat Drive; Northport, Alabama 35475; United States; 33°18′29″N 87°36′30″W

Information
- Type: Public
- Established: 1926 (100 years ago)
- School district: Tuscaloosa County School System
- CEEB code: 012005
- Principal: Darrell Williams
- Faculty: 87.80 (FTE)
- Grades: 9–12
- Enrollment: 1,562 (2023–2024)
- Student to teacher ratio: 17.79
- Colors: Royal Blue and White
- Athletics: 15 sports
- Nickname: Wildcats
- Yearbook: TusCoHi
- Website: tchs.tcss.net

Tuscaloosa County High School serves grades 9–12 and is located in Northport, Alabama, United States, forming part of the Tuscaloosa County Schools.

== History ==
The original Tuscaloosa County High was opened near downtown Northport in 1926. In 2000, it was moved to its current location, seven miles north of downtown.

== Athletics ==
Tuscaloosa County High competes in the Alabama High School Athletic Association, under class 7A region 3. The school's athletic squads are nicknamed the Wildcats. The football team won the 6A State Championship in 1997. The basketball team won the AHSAA 7A state championship in 2026.

== Notable alumni ==
- Hannah Brown, television personality, model, and Miss Alabama USA
- Rufus Deal, NFL football player
- Curley Hallman, college football coach
- Frank Lary, MLB baseball player (Detroit Tigers, Milwaukee Braves, New York Mets, Chicago White Sox)
- Lillie Leatherwood, Olympic gold medalist
- Le'Ron McClain, NFL football player
- Billy Neighbors, NFL football player
- Gregory F. Rayburn, CEO of Hostess Brands
- Andre Royal, NFL linebacker
- Bo Scarbrough, NFL running back
- Lurleen Wallace, Alabama governor

== See also ==
- Tuscaloosa County High School (historical) for 1926–1999
