= Alabama Crimson Tide football yearly statistical leaders =

Alabama Crimson Tide football yearly statistical leaders identifies the yearly statistical leaders for the Alabama Crimson Tide football program. It includes the program's leaders in rushing yards, passing yards, and receiving yards.

== Rushing, passing, and receiving ==
Year	Rushing leader	Rushing yards	Passing leader	Passing yards	Receiving leader	Receiving yards
1949	Tom Calvin	339	Ed Salem	558	Al Lary	315
1950	Bobby Marlow	882	Ed Salem	879	Al Lary	756
1951	Bobby Marlow	728	Clell Hobson	847	Ken MacAfee	287
1952	Bobby Marlow	950	Clell Hobson	336	Corky Tharp	115
1953	Corky Tharp	607	Bart Starr	870	Bill Oliver	200
1954	Corky Tharp	641	Albert Elmore	499	Bobby Luna	304
1955	Clay Walls	164	Bart Starr	587	Noojin Walker	154
1956	Don Comstock	316	Bobby Smith	356	Marshall Brown	118
1957	Jim Loftin	477	Bobby Smith	377	Willie Beck	126
1958	Bobby Jackson	472	Bobby Jackson	408	Marlin Dyess	204
1959	Pat Trammell	525	Pat Trammell	293	Marlin Dyess	149
1960	Pat Trammell	315	Robert Skelton	575	Butch Wilson	204
1961	Mike Fracchia	652	Pat Trammell	1035	Richard Williamson	206
1962	Eddie Versprille	373	Joe Namath	1192	Red Wilkins; Richard Williamson	492; 492
1963	Benny Nelson	612	Joe Namath	765	Jimmy Dill	316
1964	Steve Bowman	536	Joe Namath	536	David Ray	271
1965	Steve Bowman	770	Steve Sloan	1453	Tommy Tolleson	374
1966	Ken Stabler	397	Ken Stabler	956	Ray Perkins	490
1967	Ed Morgan	388	Ken Stabler	1214	Dennis Homan	820
1968	Ed Morgan	450	Scott Hunter	1471	George Ranager	499
1969	Johnny Musso	516	Scott Hunter	2188	David Bailey	781
1970	Johnny Musso	1137	Scott Hunter	1240	David Bailey	790
1971	Johnny Musso	1088	Terry Davis	452	David Bailey	286
1972	Steve Bisceglia	603	Terry Davis	777	Wayne Wheeler	573
1973	Wilbur Jackson	752	Gary Rutledge	897	Wayne Wheeler	530
1974	Calvin Culliver	708	Richard Todd	656	Ozzie Newsome	374
1975	Johnny Davis	820	Richard Todd	661	Ozzie Newsome	363
1976	Johnny Davis	668	Jeff Rutledge	979	Ozzie Newsome	529
1977	Johnny Davis	931	Jeff Rutledge	1207	Ozzie Newsome	804
1978	Tony Nathan	770	Jeff Rutledge	1078	Keith Pugh	446
1979	Steadman S. Shealy	791	Steadman S. Shealy	717	Keith Pugh	433
1980	Billy Jackson	606	Don Jacobs	531	Bart Krout	218
1981	Ricky Moore	347	Walter Lewis	633	Joey Jones	373
1982	Ricky Moore	600	Walter Lewis	1515	Joey Jones	502
1983	Ricky Moore	947	Walter Lewis	1991	Joey Jones	468
1984	Paul Carruth	782	Vince Sutton	662	Greg Richardson	357
1985	Gene Jelks	588	Mike Shula	2009	Albert Bell	648
1986	Bobby Humphrey	1471	Mike Shula	1486	Greg Richardson	393
1987	Bobby Humphrey	1255	Jeff Dunn	484	Clay Whitehurst	278
1988	Murry Hill	778	David Smith	1592	Greg Payne	442
1989	Siran Stacy	1079	Gary Hollingsworth	2379	Lamonde Russell	622
1990	Chris Anderson	492	Gary Holingsworth	1463	Lamonde Russell	306
1991	Siran Stacy	967	Danny Woodson	882	David Palmer	314
1992	Derrick Lassic	905	Jay Barker	1614	Curtis Brown	327
1993	Sherman Williams	738	Jay Barker	1525	David Palmer	1000
1994	Sherman Williams	1341	Jay Barker	1996	Curtis Brown	639
1995	Dennis Riddle	969	Brian Burgdorf	1200	Toderick Malone	637
1996	Dennis Riddle	1079	Freddie Kitchens	2124	Michael Vaughn	702
1997	Curtis Alexander	729	Freddie Kitchens	1545	Quincy Jackson	472
1998	Shaun Alexander	1178	Andrew Zow	1969	Quincy Jackson	621
1999	Shaun Alexander	1383	Andrew Zow	1799	Freddie Milons	733
2000	Ahmaad Galloway	659	Andrew Zow	1561	Antonio Carter	586
2001	Ahmaad Galloway	881	Tyler Watts	1325	Freddie Milons	626
2002	Shaud Williams	921	Tyler Watts	1414	Sam Collins	553
2003	Shaud Williams	1367	Brodie Croyle	2303	Zach Fletcher	498
2004	Kenneth Darby	1062	Spencer Pennington	974	Tyrone Prothro	347
2005	Kenneth Darby	1242	Brodie Croyle	2499	D. J. Hall	676
2006	Kenneth Darby	835	John Parker Wilson	2707	D. J. Hall	1056
2007	Terry Grant	891	John Parker Wilson	2846	D. J. Hall	1005
2008	Glen Coffee	1383	John Parker Wilson	2273	Julio Jones	924
2009	Mark Ingram II	1658	Greg McElroy	2508	Julio Jones	596
2010	Mark Ingram II	875	Greg McElroy	2987	Julio Jones	1133
2011	Trent Richardson	1679	A. J. McCarron	2634	Marquis Maze	627
2012	Eddie Lacy	1322	A. J. McCarron	2933	Amari Cooper	1000
2013	T. J. Yeldon	1235	A. J. McCarron	3063	Amari Cooper	736
2014	Derrick Henry	990	Blake Sims	3487	Amari Cooper	1727
2015	Derrick Henry	2219	Jake Coker	3110	Calvin Ridley	1045
2016	Damien Harris	1037	Jalen Hurts	2780	ArDarius Stewart	864
2017	Damien Harris	1000	Jalen Hurts	2081	Calvin Ridley	967
2018	Damien Harris	876	Tua Tagovailoa	3966	Jerry Jeudy	1315
2019	Najee Harris	1224	Tua Tagovailoa	2840	DeVonta Smith	1256
2020	Najee Harris	1466	Mac Jones	4500	DeVonta Smith	1856
2021	Brian Robinson Jr.	1343	Bryce Young	4872	Jameson Williams	1572
2022	Jahmyr Gibbs	926	Bryce Young	3328	Jermaine Burton	677
2023	Jase McClellan	890	Jalen Milroe	2834	Jermaine Burton	798
2024	Jalen Milroe	719	Jalen Milroe	2652	Ryan Coleman-Williams	857

== Scoring, field goals, and extra points ==
Year	Scoring	Points	Kicker	Field goals	Kicker	Extra points
1976	Bucky Berrey	53	Bucky Berrey	6	Bucky Berrey	35
1977	Tony Nathan	90	Roger Chapman	11	Roger Chapman	30
1978	Alan McElroy	58	Alan McElroy	7	Alan McElroy	37
1979	Alan McElroy	77	Alan McElroy	15	Alan McElroy	32
1980	Peter Kim	71	Peter Kim	12	Peter Kim	35
1981	Peter Kim	70	Peter Kim	15	Peter Kim	25
1982	Craig Turner	72	Peter Kim	10	Peter Kim	36
1983	Van Tiffin	82	Van Tiffin	14	Van Tiffin	40
1984	Van Tiffin	68	Van Tiffin	15	Van Tiffin	23
1985	Van Tiffin	84	Van Tiffin	17	Van Tiffin	33
1986	Bobby Humphrey	102	Van Tiffin	13	Van Tiffin	39
1987	Bobby Humphrey	78	Philip Doyle	13	Philip Doyle	18
1988	Philip Doyle	91	Philip Doyle	19	Philip Doyle	28
1989	Siran Stacy	108	Philip Doyle	22	Philip Doyle	34
1990	Philip Doyle	97	Philip Doyle	24	Philip Doyle	25
1991	Siran Stacy	60	Matt Wethington	7	Hamp Greene	24
1992	Michael Proctor	94	Michael Proctor	19	Michael Proctor	37
1993	Michael Proctor	97	Michael Proctor	22	Michael Proctor	31
1994	Michael Proctor	71	Michael Proctor	13	Michael Proctor	32
1995	Michael Proctor	64	Michael Proctor	11	Michael Proctor	31
1996	Dennis Riddle	84	Brian Cunningham	8	Brian Cunningham	19
1997	Brian Cunningham	50	Brian Cunningham	12	Brian Cunningham	14
1998	Shaun Alexander	102	J. D. Phillips	10	J. D. Phillips	26
1999	Shaun Alexander	144	Ryan Pflugner	14	Ryan Pflugner	21
2000	Neal Thomas	54	Neal Thomas	9	Neal Thomas	27
2001	Neal Thomas	78	Neal Thomas	15	Neal Thomas	33
2002	Santonio Beard	72	Kyle Robinson; Michael Ziffle; Brian Bostick	6; 6; 6	Kyle Robinson	23
2003	Shaud Williams	96	Brian Bostick	16	Brian Bostick	33
2004	Brian Bostick	83	Brian Bostick	16	Brian Bostick	35
2005	Jamie Christensen	73	Jamie Christensen	16	Jamie Christensen	25
2006	Jamie Christensen	56	Jamie Christensen	12	Jamie Christensen	17
2007	Leigh Tiffin	111	Leigh Tiffin	25	Leigh Tiffin	36
2008	Leigh Tiffin	106	Leigh Tiffin	20	Leigh Tiffin	46
2009	Leigh Tiffin	132	Leigh Tiffin	30	Leigh Tiffin	42
2010	Jeremy Shelley	86	Jeremy Shelley	12	Jeremy Shelley	50
2011	Trent Richardson	144	Jeremy Shelley	21	Jeremy Shelley	52
2012	Eddie Lacy	114	Jeremy Shelley	11	Jeremy Shelley	69
2013	Cade Foster	96	Cade Foster	12	Cade Foster	60
2014	Amari Cooper	96	Adam Griffith	12	Adam Griffith	53
2015	Derrick Henry	168	Adam Griffith	23	Adam Griffith	62
2016	Adam Griffith	129	Adam Griffith	21	Adam Griffith	66
2017	Andy Papanastos	110	Andy Papanastos	18	Andy Papanastos	56
2018	Joseph Bulovas	117	Joseph Bulovas	14	Joseph Bulovas	75
2019	Najee Harris	120	Joseph Bulovas	8	Joseph Bulovas	59
2020	Najee Harris	180	Will Reichard	14	Will Reichard	84
2021	Will Reichard	137	Will Reichard	22	Will Reichard	71
2022	Will Reichard	130	Will Reichard	22	Will Reichard	64
2023	Will Reichard	121	Will Reichard	22	Will Reichard	55
2024	Jalen Milroe	120	Graham Nicholson	6	Graham Nicholson	52

== See also ==
- Alabama Crimson Tide football statistical leaders
