= 1949 LSU Tigers football team =

American college football season

1949 LSU Tigers football

Sugar Bowl, L 0–35 vs. Oklahoma
- Conference: Southeastern Conference

Ranking
- AP: No. 9
- Record: 8–3 (4–2 SEC)
- Head coach: Gaynell Tinsley (2nd season)
- Home stadium: Tiger Stadium

1949 Southeastern Conference football standings
	Conf.					Overall
Team	W		L		T	W		L		T
Tulane $	5	–	1	–	0	7	–	2	–	1
No. 11 Kentucky	4	–	1	–	0	9	–	3	–	0
No. 17 Tennessee	4	–	1	–	1	7	–	2	–	1
Georgia Tech	5	–	2	–	0	7	–	3	–	0
No. 9 LSU	4	–	2	–	0	8	–	3	–	0
Alabama	4	–	3	–	1	6	–	3	–	1
Vanderbilt	4	–	4	–	0	5	–	5	–	0
Auburn	2	–	4	–	2	2	–	4	–	3
Ole Miss	2	–	4	–	0	4	–	5	–	1
Florida	1	–	4	–	1	4	–	5	–	1
Georgia	1	–	4	–	1	4	–	6	–	1
Mississippi State	0	–	6	–	0	0	–	8	–	1
$ – Conference champion; Rankings from AP Poll

The 1949 LSU Tigers football team was an American football team that represented Louisiana State University (LSU) as a member of the Southeastern Conference (SEC) during the 1949 college football season. In their second year under head coach Gaynell Tinsley, the team compiled an overall record of 8–3, with a mark of 4–2 in conference play, placing fifth in the SEC, and with a loss against Oklahoma in the Sugar Bowl.

== Schedule ==
Date	Opponent	Rank	Site	Result	Attendance	Source
September 24	Kentucky		Tiger Stadium; Baton Rouge, LA	L 0–19	35,000	
October 1	Rice*		Tiger Stadium; Baton Rouge, LA	W 14–7	30,000	
October 8	Texas A&M*		Tiger Stadium; Baton Rouge, LA (rivalry)	W 34–0	30,000	
October 14	at Georgia		Sanford Stadium; Athens, GA	L 0–7		
October 22	No. 6 North Carolina		Tiger Stadium; Baton Rouge, LA	W 13–7	44,000	
October 29	Ole Miss	No. 17	Tiger Stadium; Baton Rouge, LA (rivalry)	W 34–7	35,000	
November 5	Vanderbilt	No. 17	Tiger Stadium; Baton Rouge, LA	W 33–13		
November 12	Mississippi State^{†}	No. 16	Tiger Stadium; Baton Rouge, LA (rivalry)	W 34–7		
November 19	Southeastern Louisiana*	No. 13	Tiger Stadium; Baton Rouge, LA	W 48–7	19,000	
November 26	at No. 10 Tulane	No. 13	Tulane Stadium; New Orleans, LA (Battle for the Rag)	W 21–0	80,000	
January 2, 1950	vs. No. 2 Oklahoma	No. 9	Tulane Stadium; New Orleans, LA (Sugar Bowl)	L 0–35	82,000	
*Non-conference game; ^{†}Homecoming; Rankings from AP Poll released prior to the game

== Rankings ==
Ranking movements Legend: ██ Increase in ranking ██ Decrease in ranking — = Not ranked
	Week								
Poll	1	2	3	4	5	6	7	8	Final
AP	—	—	—	17	17	16	13	13	9

== After the season ==
The following Tigers were selected in the 1950 NFL draft after the season.

Round	Pick	Player	Position	NFL team
3	37	Ray Collins	Tackle	San Francisco 49ers
4	42	Zollie Toth	Back	New York Bulldogs
8	98	Ebert Van Buren	Back	New York Giants
10	120	Melvin Lyle	End	New York Bulldogs
14	180	Al Hover	Guard	Chicago Bears
