= 1950 Sugar Bowl =

American college football game

- 16th Sugar Bowl
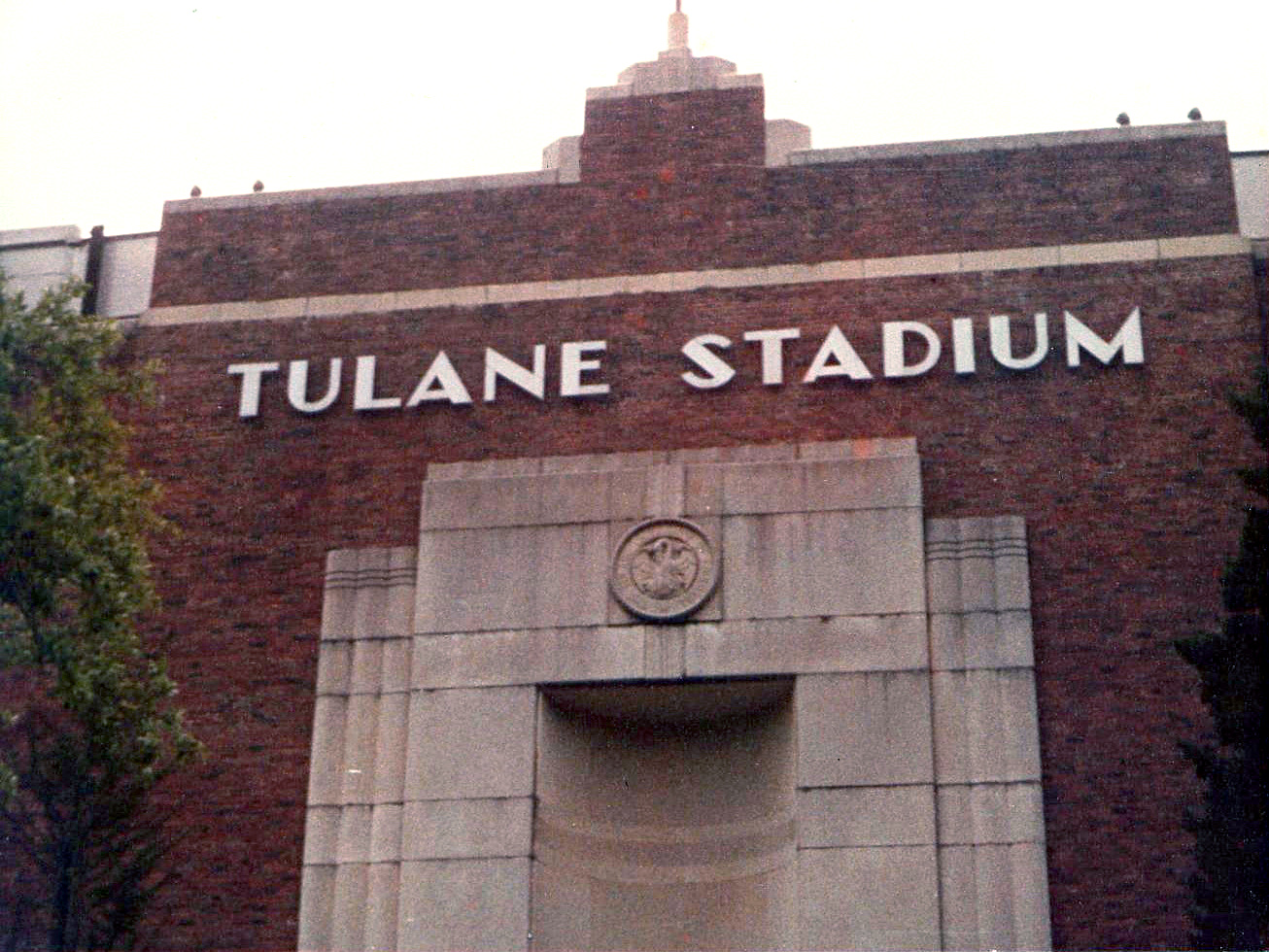
- Tulane Stadium in New Orleans, Louisiana, hosted the Sugar Bowl.
Oklahoma Sooners	LSU Tigers
(10–0)	(8–2)
Big 7	SEC
35	0
Head coach: Bud Wilkinson	Head coach: Gaynell Tinsley
AP 2	AP 9
	1	2	3	4	Total
Oklahoma	0	14	7	14	35
LSU	0	0	0	0	0
- Date: January 2, 1950
- Season: 1949
- Stadium: Tulane Stadium
- Location: New Orleans, Louisiana
- Referee: Alvin Bell (SEC; split crew: SEC, Big Seven)
- Attendance: 82,000

The 1950 Sugar Bowl featured the second ranked Oklahoma Sooners and the 9th ranked LSU Tigers.

Prior to the game, former LSU player Piggy Barnes was caught spying on Oklahoma practices with a telescope and a camera.

After a scoreless first quarter, Leon Heath scored on touchdown runs of 86 and 34 yards in the second quarter, as Oklahoma built a 14–0 lead. He would finish the game with 170 yards on 15 carries with two scores. In the third quarter, Pearson threw a 34-yard touchdown pass to Thomas as Oklahoma extended its lead to 21–0. In the fourth quarter, Thomas and Royal scored on runs of 5 yard each as Oklahoma won 35–0. Leon Heath was named Sugar Bowl MVP.
