= 1949 Tulane Green Wave football team =

American college football season

1949 Tulane Green Wave football
- Top row (left to right): Dennis Doyle, Bobby Jones, Rex Partridge. Bottom row (left to right): Max Druen, Bill Svoboda, Dick Sheffield

SEC champion
- Conference: Southeastern Conference
- Record: 7–2–1 (5–1 SEC)
- Head coach: Henry Frnka (4th season)
- Captains: Max Druen; Richard Sheffield; Bill Svoboda; Francis Young
- Home stadium: Tulane Stadium

1949 Southeastern Conference football standings
	Conf.					Overall
Team	W		L		T	W		L		T
Tulane $	5	–	1	–	0	7	–	2	–	1
No. 11 Kentucky	4	–	1	–	0	9	–	3	–	0
No. 17 Tennessee	4	–	1	–	1	7	–	2	–	1
Georgia Tech	5	–	2	–	0	7	–	3	–	0
No. 9 LSU	4	–	2	–	0	8	–	3	–	0
Alabama	4	–	3	–	1	6	–	3	–	1
Vanderbilt	4	–	4	–	0	5	–	5	–	0
Auburn	2	–	4	–	2	2	–	4	–	3
Ole Miss	2	–	4	–	0	4	–	5	–	1
Florida	1	–	4	–	1	4	–	5	–	1
Georgia	1	–	4	–	1	4	–	6	–	1
Mississippi State	0	–	6	–	0	0	–	8	–	1
$ – Conference champion; Rankings from AP Poll

The 1949 Tulane Green Wave football team was an American football team that represented Tulane University as a member of the Southeastern Conference (SEC) during the 1949 college football season. In its fourth year under head coach Henry Frnka, Tulane compiled a 7–2–1 record (5–1 in conference games), won the SEC championship, and outscored opponents by a total of 251 to 142. Tulane was ranked No. 19 in the final Litkenhous Ratings released in December 1949.

Halfback Eddie Price received first-team All-America honors from the International News Service (INS) and was named to the second team by the Football Writers Association of America (FWAA). He also received fitst-team honors from the AP and UP on the 1949 All-SEC football team. Other All-SEC honorees included tackle Paul Lea (AP-1, UP-2) and guard Dennis Doyle (AP-2, UP-2).

The Green Wave played its home games at Tulane Stadium in New Orleans.

== Schedule ==
Date	Opponent	Rank	Site	Result	Attendance	Source
September 24	vs. Alabama		Ladd Stadium; Mobile, AL	W 28–14	37,500	
October 1	Georgia Tech		Tulane Stadium; New Orleans, LA	W 18–0	55,000	
October 8	Southeastern Louisiana*	No. 4	Tulane Stadium; New Orleans, LA	W 40–0	18,000	
October 15	at No. 1 Notre Dame*	No. 4	Notre Dame Stadium; Notre Dame, IN	L 7–46	58,196	
October 22	Auburn	No. 20	Tulane Stadium; New Orleans, LA (rivalry)	W 14–6	23,000	
October 29	Mississippi State		Tulane Stadium; New Orleans, LA	W 54–6	35,000	
November 5	Navy*		Tulane Stadium; New Orleans, LA	T 21–21	70,000	
November 12	at Vanderbilt		Dudley Field; Nashville, TN	W 41–14		
November 19	at No. 9 Virginia*	No. 19	Scott Stadium; Charlottesville, VA	W 28–14	30,000	
November 26	No. 13 LSU	No. 10	Tulane Stadium; New Orleans, LA (Battle for the Rag)	L 0–21	80,000	
*Non-conference game; Rankings from AP Poll released prior to the game

== Rankings ==
Ranking movements Legend: ██ Increase in ranking ██ Decrease in ranking — = Not ranked т = Tied with team above or below ( ) = First-place votes
	Week								
Poll	1	2	3	4	5	6	7	8	Final
AP	4 (4)	4 (1)	20	—	—	—	19т	10	—
