= Frank Lary =

American baseball player (1930–2017)

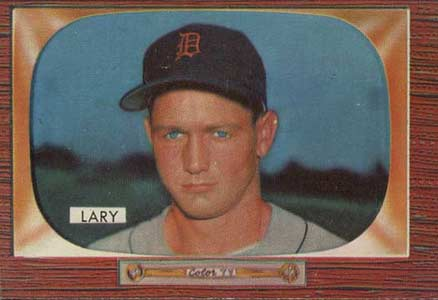
- Pitcher
- Born: April 10, 1930; Northport, Alabama, U.S.
- Died: December 13, 2017 (aged 87); Tuscaloosa, Alabama, U.S.
- Batted: Right Threw: Right

MLB debut
- September 14, 1954, for the Detroit Tigers

Last MLB appearance
- September 21, 1965, for the Chicago White Sox

MLB statistics
- Win–loss record: 128–116
- Earned run average: 3.49
- Strikeouts: 1,099
- Stats at Baseball Reference

Teams
- Detroit Tigers (1954–1964); New York Mets (1964); Milwaukee Braves (1964); New York Mets (1965); Chicago White Sox (1965)

Career highlights and awards
- 3× All-Star (1960–1961); Gold Glove Award (1961); AL wins leader (1956)

Frank Strong Lary (April 10, 1930 – December 13, 2017) was an American Major League Baseball pitcher for the Detroit Tigers (1954–1964), New York Mets (1964, 1965), Milwaukee Braves (1964), and Chicago White Sox (1965). He led the American League with 21 wins in 1956 and ranked second in the same category with 23 wins in 1961. Lary was selected to the American League All-Star team in 1960 and 1961 and won the Gold Glove Award in 1961. He was known variously as "Taters", "Mule", and the "Yankee Killer." The latter nickname was won due to his 27–10 record against the New York Yankees from 1955 to 1961.

== Early years ==
Lary was born in Northport, Alabama, in April 1930 as the sixth of seven children in the family. He was raised with his six brothers at a two-bedroom house in his family's farm near Northport. His father, Joseph Milton "Mitt" Lary, was a cotton farmer and a former semipro spitball pitcher, who coached young Lary and five of his brothers when they were not working in the farm. His mother, Margaret, was a fiddle maker. Lary attended Tuscaloosa County High School and then went on to play baseball for the University of Alabama. His older brother Al Lary was briefly a pitcher for the Chicago Cubs, but spent most of his baseball career in the minor leagues. Lary followed his older brothers to the University of Alabama, where he had a 10–1 record in 1950 and won two more games in the College World Series. Lary dropped out of Alabama after two years to play professional baseball.

== Minor leagues ==
After his performance in the 1950 College World Series, Lary signed a $6,000 contract with the Toledo Mud Hens, the Detroit Tigers' American Association farm club. He began his minor league career playing at Thomasville, Georgia, in the Georgia–Florida League. After winning four consecutive games in Thomasville, he moved to Jamestown, New York, in the PONY League, where he compiled a 5–2 record. Lary missed the 1951 and 1952 seasons due to service in the U.S. Army. He was considered a leading prospect with the Buffalo Bisons of the International League in 1953 and 1954. During the 1953 season, he compiled a 17–11 record and threw a no-hitter against Ottawa. In 1954, he compiled a 15–11 record and won 10 of his last 12 games.

== Detroit Tigers ==
Lary was called up to the Tigers late in the 1954 season, making his Major League debut on September 14. He played in parts of 11 seasons for the Tigers, and his 123 wins rank tenth in team history.

In 1955, Lary stepped into the Tigers' rotation as a starter and compiled a record of 14–15 in 36 games.

In 1956, Lary compiled a 21–13 record and became the Tigers' first 20-game winner since Hal Newhouser won 21 games in 1948. His record was 17-3 after July 1. Lary also led the American League in multiple statistical categories in 1956, including wins (21), games started (38), innings pitched (294), hits allowed (289), hit batsmen (12), and batters faced (1,269), and finished 17th in the voting for Most Valuable Player in the American League. His total of 1,269 batters faced was the highest total by a pitcher in the American League during the 1950s. (Note: Bob Lemon faced 1,254 batters in 1950 to rank second behind Lary.)

During his years with the Tigers, Lary became known as "The Yankee Killer." He had a 27–10 record against the New York Yankees from 1955 to 1961, years during which the Yankees won six American League pennants. In 1956, he compiled a record of 5–1 against a Yankees team that had an overall record of 97–57. In 1958, he was 7–1 against a Yankees team that had an overall record of 92–62. He became the first pitcher to win seven games in one year against the Yankees since Ed Cicotte accomplished the feat in 1916. A good hitting pitcher, Lary defeated the Yankees 4–3 on May 12, 1961, by hitting a lead off home run in the top of the ninth inning. This took place immediately following the ejection of teammate, outfielder Rocky Colavito, who had bolted into the stands at Yankee Stadium when he observed a Yankee fan tussling with his father. In The Sporting News, Joe Falls wrote: "As far as Frank Lary is concerned, the war between the states never did end. There merely was an 89-year interlude between Lee's surrender at Appomattox in 1865 and Lary's arrival in the major leagues in 1954. The objective has remained the same: rout the Yankees." He was also 5–1 against the Yankees in 1959. Yankees manager Casey Stengel once delayed the appearance of his star pitcher, Whitey Ford, by one day so Ford would not have to face Lary. Stengel explained to reporters, "If Lary is going to beat us anyway, why should I waste my best pitcher?"

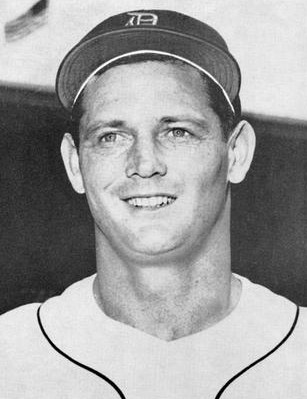
Lary, circa 1959

Lary also was known by the nickname "Taters" after a teammate noticed him write "Taters" for potatoes on a dining car order during a 1955 road trip. "He has been 'Taters' around the clubhouse and in the dugout ever since." In a 1961 profile of Lary, Sports Illustrated wrote:

"Frank Lary is a classic kind of ballplayer—the type, alas, you don't see much of these days. He is a throwback to the Cardinals of the 30s, a cotton pickin', gee-tar strummin', red clay Alabama farm boy, unspoiled by a little college or a lot of success. He is mean on the mound and a joker off it. To strangers he is quiet, but to the Tigers he is the Jonathan Winters of the dugout, keeping them loose and laughing. Sometimes he is a Casey Stengel, his legs bowed, his pants rolled above his knees. Then he is the trainer, complete in white shirt, white trousers and with a Turkish towel wrapped around his head."

In 1960, Lary was selected for the first time as an All-Star. He led the American League that year in games started (36), complete games (15), innings pitched (279.1) and hit batsmen (19).

In 1961, Lary had the best season of his career. With a record of 23–9, he was the top pitcher on a 1961 Detroit Tigers team that compiled a record of 101–61. Lary's 23 wins were a career-high and second in the American League to Ford. Lary also threw a career-high and league-leading 22 complete games in 1961. Lary was also selected for the American League All-Star team and won the Gold Glove Award in 1961. He finished third in the 1961 Cy Young Award behind Ford and Warren Spahn.

Lary was a workhorse for the Tigers from 1955 to 1961. During that seven-year span, Lary led the American League in wins (117), complete games (115), innings pitched (1,799 2/3), games started (242), and batters faced (7,569). (Note: Whitey Ford ranked second in wins during the same period with 115. Billy Pierce ranked second in complete games with 97. Early Wynn ranked second in games started (225), innings pitched (1,613 2/3) and batters faced (6,827).) He started more than 30 games in each of those seven season and led the American League in complete games three times in four years from 1958 to 1961.

In 1962, the workload caught up with Lary, as he began having shoulder problems. He began the season with a 2–6 record and had only two complete games in 13 starts. He was placed on the disabled list in August 1962. Lary started the 1963 season in the minor leagues, and compiled a record of 4-9 after being recalled to the Tigers. He began the 1963 season with an 0–2 record for Detroit, giving him a record of 6–17 in his final three seasons in Detroit.

== Mets, Braves and White Sox ==
In May 1964, the New York Mets purchased Lary from the Tigers. Lary compiled a 2–3 record for the Mets, and threw a two-hit shutout in his last game for the team during the 1964 season. In August 1964, the Mets traded Lary to the Milwaukee Braves in exchange for Dennis Ribant and $25,000. He was reacquired by the Mets in March 1965. Lary had a 1–3 record for the Mets in 1965. In July 1965, the Mets traded Lary to the Chicago White Sox for a player to be named later. Lary appeared in 14 games for the White Sox and compiled a 1–0 record.

== Career statistics ==
In 12 seasons, Lary recorded a 128-116 won-loss record, a .525 winning percentage with a 3.49 earned run average in 350 appearances with 21 shutouts and 1,099 strikeouts in 2,162.1 innings pitched. As a hitter, Lary posted a .177 batting average (130-for-734) with 68 runs, 6 triples, 6 home runs, 54 RBI and 39 bases on balls. Defensively, he finished his career with a .962 fielding percentage

== Pitching style ==
When Lary first came up, he relied on a hard fastball and a slider. Ned Garver suggested he try adding a changeup to fool hitters, though Garver later reflected that this new approach did not help Lary much. However, pitching coach Johnny Sain got Lary to try throwing a knuckleball. Lary had difficulty with the pitch at first but ultimately improved at throwing it, to the point that he could throw it as a strike.

== Later years ==
After finishing his pitching career, Lary went on to coach and scout for various teams. After retiring from baseball, Lary lived in Tuscaloosa, Alabama, where he began a construction business. In 1986, he was living in Northport and working for a company that paved roads. In the 1968 election, Lary endorsed third party candidate and fellow Alabamian, George C Wallace.

Lary died on the night of December 13, 2017 at a hospital in Tuscaloosa, Alabama, south of Northport from pneumonia at the age of 87.

== See also ==
- List of Major League Baseball annual wins leaders
- List of Major League Baseball career hit batsmen leaders
