= 1949 Kentucky Wildcats football team =

American college football season

1949 Kentucky Wildcats football

Orange Bowl, L 13–21 vs. Santa Clara
- Conference: Southeastern Conference

Ranking
- AP: No. 11
- Record: 9–3 (4–1 SEC)
- Head coach: Bear Bryant (4th season)
- Captains: Harry Ulinski; Dick Holway
- Home stadium: McLean Stadium

1949 Southeastern Conference football standings
| | Conf. | | | | | Overall |
| Team | W | | L | | T | W | | L | | T |
|---|---|---|---|---|---|---|---|---|---|---|
| Tulane $ | 5 | – | 1 | – | 0 | 7 | – | 2 | – | 1 |
| No. 11 Kentucky | 4 | – | 1 | – | 0 | 9 | – | 3 | – | 0 |
| No. 17 Tennessee | 4 | – | 1 | – | 1 | 7 | – | 2 | – | 1 |
| Georgia Tech | 5 | – | 2 | – | 0 | 7 | – | 3 | – | 0 |
| No. 9 LSU | 4 | – | 2 | – | 0 | 8 | – | 3 | – | 0 |
| Alabama | 4 | – | 3 | – | 1 | 6 | – | 3 | – | 1 |
| Vanderbilt | 4 | – | 4 | – | 0 | 5 | – | 5 | – | 0 |
| Auburn | 2 | – | 4 | – | 2 | 2 | – | 4 | – | 3 |
| Ole Miss | 2 | – | 4 | – | 0 | 4 | – | 5 | – | 1 |
| Florida | 1 | – | 4 | – | 1 | 4 | – | 5 | – | 1 |
| Georgia | 1 | – | 4 | – | 1 | 4 | – | 6 | – | 1 |
| Mississippi State | 0 | – | 6 | – | 0 | 0 | – | 8 | – | 1 |
$ – Conference champion; Rankings from AP Poll

The 1949 Kentucky Wildcats football team represented the University of Kentucky in the 1949 college football season. The Wildcats' were led by head coach Bear Bryant in his fourth season and finished the season with a record of nine wins and three losses (9–3 overall, 4–1 in the SEC).

== Schedule ==
| Date | Opponent | Rank | Site | Result | Attendance | Source |
|---|---|---|---|---|---|---|
| September 17 | Mississippi Southern* | | McLean Stadium; Lexington, KY | W 71–7 | 25,000 | |
| September 24 | at LSU | | Tiger Stadium; Baton Rouge, LA | W 19–0 | 35,000 | |
| October 1 | at Ole Miss | | Hemingway Stadium; Oxford, MS | W 47–0 | 21,000 | |
| October 8 | Georgia | No. 15 | McLean Stadium; Lexington, KY | W 25–0 | 36,000 | |
| October 15 | The Citadel* | No. 8 | McLean Stadium; Lexington, KY | W 44–0 | | |
| October 22 | at No. 17 SMU* | No. 7 | Cotton Bowl; Dallas, TX | L 7–20 | 48,000 | |
| October 29 | Cincinnati* | No. 14 | McLean Stadium; Lexington, KY | W 14–7 | | |
| November 5 | at Xavier* | No. 13 | Corcoran Stadium; Cincinnati, OH | W 21–7 | 16,348 | |
| November 12 | at Florida | No. 14 | Phillips Field; Tampa, Florida (rivalry) | W 35–0 | 20,000 | |
| November 19 | Tennessee | No. 11 | McLean Stadium; Lexington, KY (rivalry) | L 0–6 | 38,000 | |
| November 25 | at Miami (FL)* | No. 20 | Burdine Stadium; Miami, FL | W 21–6 | 42,970 | |
| January 2, 1950 | vs. No. 14 Santa Clara* | No. 20 | Burdine Stadium; Miami, FL (Orange Bowl) | L 13–21 | 64,816 | |
*Non-conference game; Rankings from AP Poll released prior to the game

== Rankings ==
Ranking movements Legend: ██ Increase in ranking ██ Decrease in ranking т = Tied with team above or below ( ) = First-place votes
| | Week | | | | | | | | |
| Poll | 1 | 2 | 3 | 4 | 5 | 6 | 7 | 8 | Final |
|---|---|---|---|---|---|---|---|---|---|
| AP | 15 (1) | 8 (8) | 7 (3) | 14 | 13 | 14 | 11 | 20т | 11 |
