= 1949 Vanderbilt Commodores football team =

American college football season

1949 Vanderbilt Commodores football
- Conference: Southeastern Conference
- Record: 5–5 (4–4 SEC)
- Head coach: Bill Edwards (1st season)
- Offensive scheme: T formation
- Captain: Carl Copp
- Home stadium: Dudley Field

1949 Southeastern Conference football standings
	Conf.					Overall
Team	W		L		T	W		L		T
Tulane $	5	–	1	–	0	7	–	2	–	1
No. 11 Kentucky	4	–	1	–	0	9	–	3	–	0
No. 17 Tennessee	4	–	1	–	1	7	–	2	–	1
Georgia Tech	5	–	2	–	0	7	–	3	–	0
No. 9 LSU	4	–	2	–	0	8	–	3	–	0
Alabama	4	–	3	–	1	6	–	3	–	1
Vanderbilt	4	–	4	–	0	5	–	5	–	0
Auburn	2	–	4	–	2	2	–	4	–	3
Ole Miss	2	–	4	–	0	4	–	5	–	1
Florida	1	–	4	–	1	4	–	5	–	1
Georgia	1	–	4	–	1	4	–	6	–	1
Mississippi State	0	–	6	–	0	0	–	8	–	1
$ – Conference champion; Rankings from AP Poll

The 1949 Vanderbilt Commodores football team represented Vanderbilt University during the 1949 college football season. The team's head coach was Bill Edwards, who served his first season as the Commodores' head coach. Vanderbilt went 5–5 with a record of 4–4 in Southeastern Conference play. The Commodores played their six home games at Dudley Field in Nashville, Tennessee.

== Schedule ==
Date	Opponent	Site	Result	Attendance	Source
September 24	at Georgia Tech	Grant Field; Atlanta, GA (rivalry)	L 7–12	39,000	
October 1	Alabama	Dudley Field; Nashville, TN	W 14–7	27,500	
October 8	Ole Miss	Dudley Field; Nashville, TN (rivalry)	W 28–27		
October 15	vs. Florida	Gator Bowl Stadium; Jacksonville, FL	W 22–17		
October 22	Arkansas*	Dudley Field; Nashville, TN	L 6–7	26,500	
October 29	Auburn^{†}	Dudley Field; Nashville, TN	W 26–7	25,000	
November 5	at No. 17 LSU	Tiger Stadium; Baton Rouge, LA	L 13–33		
November 12	Tulane	Dudley Field; Nashville, TN	L 14–41		
November 19	Marshall*	Dudley Field; Nashville, TN	W 27–6	17,000	
November 26	at No. 18 Tennessee	Shields–Watkins Field; Knoxville, TN (rivalry)	L 20–26	42,000	
*Non-conference game; ^{†}Homecoming; Rankings from AP Poll released prior to the game
