= Corky Tharp =

American gridiron football player (1931–2003)

No. 83, 45
- Position: Defensive back

Personal information
- Born: April 19, 1931; Birmingham, Alabama, U.S.
- Died: April 1, 2003 (aged 71); Birmingham, Alabama, U.S.
- Listed height: 5 ft 10 in (1.78 m)
- Listed weight: 180 lb (82 kg)

Career information
- High school: Ramsay (AL)
- College: Alabama
- NFL draft: 1955: 6th round, 67th overall pick

Career history
- Toronto Argonauts (1955–1959); New York Titans (1960); Tuscaloosa Warriors (1963)

Awards and highlights
- Second-team All-American (1954); 2× First-team All-SEC (1953, 1954); Second-team All-SEC (1952)

Career AFL statistics
- Interceptions: 2
- Stats at Pro Football Reference

Thomas Allen "Corky" Tharp (April 19, 1931 – April 3, 2003) was an American football defensive back who played one season for the New York Titans of the American Football League (AFL). He also played for the Toronto Argonauts of the Interprovincial Rugby Football Union and the Tuscaloosa Warriors of the Southern Professional Football League. He played college football at the University of Alabama for the Alabama Crimson Tide football team.

== See also ==
- Alabama Crimson Tide football yearly statistical leaders
