= 1949 Georgia Tech Yellow Jackets football team =

American college football season

1949 Georgia Tech Yellow Jackets football
- Conference: Southeastern Conference
- Record: 7–3 (5–2 SEC)
- Head coach: Bobby Dodd (5th season)
- Captain: Tom Coleman
- Home stadium: Grant Field

1949 Southeastern Conference football standings
| | Conf. | | | | | Overall |
| Team | W | | L | | T | W | | L | | T |
|---|---|---|---|---|---|---|---|---|---|---|
| Tulane $ | 5 | – | 1 | – | 0 | 7 | – | 2 | – | 1 |
| No. 11 Kentucky | 4 | – | 1 | – | 0 | 9 | – | 3 | – | 0 |
| No. 17 Tennessee | 4 | – | 1 | – | 1 | 7 | – | 2 | – | 1 |
| Georgia Tech | 5 | – | 2 | – | 0 | 7 | – | 3 | – | 0 |
| No. 9 LSU | 4 | – | 2 | – | 0 | 8 | – | 3 | – | 0 |
| Alabama | 4 | – | 3 | – | 1 | 6 | – | 3 | – | 1 |
| Vanderbilt | 4 | – | 4 | – | 0 | 5 | – | 5 | – | 0 |
| Auburn | 2 | – | 4 | – | 2 | 2 | – | 4 | – | 3 |
| Ole Miss | 2 | – | 4 | – | 0 | 4 | – | 5 | – | 1 |
| Florida | 1 | – | 4 | – | 1 | 4 | – | 5 | – | 1 |
| Georgia | 1 | – | 4 | – | 1 | 4 | – | 6 | – | 1 |
| Mississippi State | 0 | – | 6 | – | 0 | 0 | – | 8 | – | 1 |
$ – Conference champion; Rankings from AP Poll

The 1949 Georgia Tech Yellow Jackets football team represented the Georgia Tech Yellow Jackets of the Georgia Institute of Technology during the 1949 college football season.

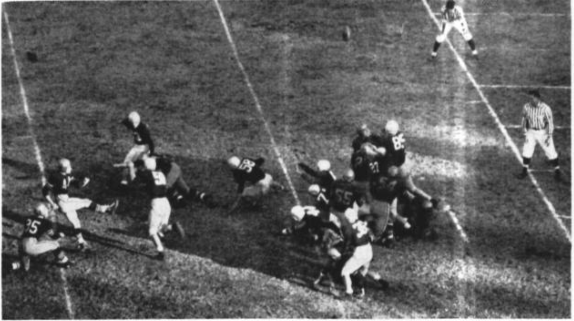
"Red" Patton kicking the game-winning conversion against the Georgia Bulldogs

== Schedule ==
| Date | Opponent | Site | Result | Attendance | Source |
|---|---|---|---|---|---|
| September 24 | Vanderbilt | Grant Field; Atlanta, GA (rivalry) | W 12–7 | 39,000 | |
| October 1 | at Tulane | Tulane Stadium; New Orleans, LA | L 0–18 | 55,000 | |
| October 8 | Washington and Lee* | Grant Field; Atlanta, GA | W 36–0 | 22,000 | |
| October 15 | Auburn | Grant Field; Atlanta, GA (rivalry) | W 35–21 | 32,000 | |
| October 22 | at Florida | Florida Field; Gainesville, FL | W 43–14 | | |
| October 29 | Duke* | Grant Field; Atlanta, GA | L 14–27 | 38,000 | |
| November 5 | at No. 14 Tennessee | Shields–Watkins Field; Knoxville, TN (rivalry) | W 30–13 | 45,000 | |
| November 12 | at Alabama | Legion Field; Birmingham, AL (rivalry) | L 7–20 | 43,000 | |
| November 19 | South Carolina* | Grant Field; Atlanta, GA | W 13–3 | 20,000 | |
| November 26 | Georgia | Grant Field; Atlanta, GA (Clean, Old-Fashioned Hate) | W 7–6 | 40,000 | |
*Non-conference game; Rankings from AP Poll released prior to the game
