= 1949 Florida Gators football team =

American college football season

1949 Florida Gators football
- Conference: Southeastern Conference
- Record: 4–5–1 (1–4–1 SEC)
- Head coach: Raymond Wolf (4th season)
- Offensive scheme: T formation
- Captain: James W. Kynes
- Home stadium: Florida Field

1949 Southeastern Conference football standings
	Conf.					Overall
Team	W		L		T	W		L		T
Tulane $	5	–	1	–	0	7	–	2	–	1
No. 11 Kentucky	4	–	1	–	0	9	–	3	–	0
No. 17 Tennessee	4	–	1	–	1	7	–	2	–	1
Georgia Tech	5	–	2	–	0	7	–	3	–	0
No. 9 LSU	4	–	2	–	0	8	–	3	–	0
Alabama	4	–	3	–	1	6	–	3	–	1
Vanderbilt	4	–	4	–	0	5	–	5	–	0
Auburn	2	–	4	–	2	2	–	4	–	3
Ole Miss	2	–	4	–	0	4	–	5	–	1
Florida	1	–	4	–	1	4	–	5	–	1
Georgia	1	–	4	–	1	4	–	6	–	1
Mississippi State	0	–	6	–	0	0	–	8	–	1
$ – Conference champion; Rankings from AP Poll

The 1949 Florida Gators football team represented the University of Florida during the 1949 college football season. The season was Raymond Wolf's fourth and last as the head coach of the Florida Gators football team. Wolf's 1949 Florida Gators finished 4–5–1 overall and 1–4–1 in the Southeastern Conference (SEC), placing tenth of twelve SEC teams, and ending the Gators' "Golden Era."

== Schedule ==
The highlight of the 1949 season was the Gators' 28–7 upset of the Georgia Bulldogs. Led by halfback Chuck Hunsinger, who rushed for 171 yards and three touchdowns, and team captain Jimmy Kynes, who was the defensive star and played every minute of the sixty-minute game, the Gators beat the Dawgs for the first time since 1940.

Date	Opponent	Site	Result	Attendance	Source
September 24	The Citadel*	Florida Field; Gainesville, FL	W 13–0	20,000	
October 1	at Tulsa*	Skelly Stadium; Tulsa, OK	W 40–7	9,428	
October 8	vs. Auburn	Ladd Memorial Stadium; Mobile, AL (rivalry)	T 14–14	11,750	
October 15	vs. Vanderbilt	Gator Bowl Stadium; Jacksonville, FL	L 17–22		
October 22	Georgia Tech^{†}	Florida Field; Gainesville, FL	L 14–43		
October 29	Furman*	Florida Field; Gainesville, FL	W 28–27	9,000	
November 5	vs. Georgia	Gator Bowl Stadium; Jacksonville, FL (rivalry)	W 28–7	36,500	
November 12	vs. No. 14 Kentucky	Phillips Field; Tampa, FL (rivalry)	L 0–35	20,000	
November 18	at Miami (FL)*	Burdine Stadium; Miami, FL (rivalry)	L 13–28	55,981	
November 26	Alabama	Florida Field; Gainesville, FL (rivalry)	L 13–35	44,000	
*Non-conference game; ^{†}Homecoming; Rankings from AP Poll released prior to the game

=== Mr. Two Bits ===
The otherwise lackluster season is notable for the beginning of the Mr. Two Bits tradition. Tampa insurance salesman George Edmondson Jr., a former Citadel student, was in attendance at the season opening game against his former school and was struck by the lack of support shown by the fans at Florida Field. Feeling sorry for Florida's players, he began leading his section in the traditional "two bits" cheer. The Gators won, and the cheer was so well received that Edmonson returned to Gainesville later in the season to lead it again. This began a decades-long tradition, as Edmonson would continue to lead the cheer from the stands and (eventually) from the field as "Mr. Two Bits" until his retirement from the role in 2008. Since then, Gator "celebrities" and selected students have filled the role.

== Postseason ==
After Wolf left Gainesville, he returned to his alma mater, Texas Christian University, where he became a long-time administrator.
