= 1949 Mississippi State Maroons football team =

American college football season

1949 Mississippi State Maroons football
- Conference: Southeastern Conference
- Record: 0–8–1 (0–6 SEC)
- Head coach: Arthur Morton (1st season)
- Home stadium: Scott Field

1949 Southeastern Conference football standings
	Conf.					Overall
Team	W		L		T	W		L		T
Tulane $	5	–	1	–	0	7	–	2	–	1
No. 11 Kentucky	4	–	1	–	0	9	–	3	–	0
No. 17 Tennessee	4	–	1	–	1	7	–	2	–	1
Georgia Tech	5	–	2	–	0	7	–	3	–	0
No. 9 LSU	4	–	2	–	0	8	–	3	–	0
Alabama	4	–	3	–	1	6	–	3	–	1
Vanderbilt	4	–	4	–	0	5	–	5	–	0
Auburn	2	–	4	–	2	2	–	4	–	3
Ole Miss	2	–	4	–	0	4	–	5	–	1
Florida	1	–	4	–	1	4	–	5	–	1
Georgia	1	–	4	–	1	4	–	6	–	1
Mississippi State	0	–	6	–	0	0	–	8	–	1
$ – Conference champion; Rankings from AP Poll

The 1949 Mississippi State Maroons football team represented Mississippi State College as a member of the Southeastern Conference (SEC) during the 1949 college football season. In their first season under new head coach Arthur Morton, the Maroons compiled an overall record of 0–8–1 and finished last of 12 teams in the SEC with a conference mark of 0–6. Mississippi State failed to score more than seven points in any game all season.

== Schedule ==
Date	Opponent	Site	Result	Attendance	Source
September 24	at Tennessee	Shields–Watkins Field; Knoxville, TN	L 0–10	32,000	
October 1	Baylor*	Scott Field; Starkville, MS	L 6–14	15,000	
October 8	at Clemson*	Memorial Stadium; Clemson, SC	T 7–7	18,000	
October 15	at Cincinnati*	Nippert Stadium; Cincinnati, OH	L 0–19		
October 22	at Alabama	Denny Stadium; Tuscaloosa, AL (rivalry)	L 6–35	26,000	
October 29	at Tulane	Tulane Stadium; New Orleans, LA	L 6–54	35,000	
November 5	at Auburn	Cliff Hare Stadium; Auburn, AL	L 6–25	20,000	
November 12	at No. 16 LSU	Tiger Stadium; Baton Rouge, LA (rivalry)	L 7–34		
November 26	Ole Miss	Scott Field; Starkville, MS (Egg Bowl)	L 0–26	32,000	
*Non-conference game; Rankings from AP Poll released prior to the game
