= 1949 Tennessee Volunteers football team =

American college football season

1949 Tennessee Volunteers football
- Conference: Southeastern Conference

Ranking
- AP: No. 17
- Record: 7–2–1 (4–1–1 SEC)
- Head coach: Robert Neyland (18th season)
- Offensive scheme: Single-wing
- Home stadium: Shields–Watkins Field

1949 Southeastern Conference football standings
	Conf.					Overall
Team	W		L		T	W		L		T
Tulane $	5	–	1	–	0	7	–	2	–	1
No. 11 Kentucky	4	–	1	–	0	9	–	3	–	0
No. 17 Tennessee	4	–	1	–	1	7	–	2	–	1
Georgia Tech	5	–	2	–	0	7	–	3	–	0
No. 9 LSU	4	–	2	–	0	8	–	3	–	0
Alabama	4	–	3	–	1	6	–	3	–	1
Vanderbilt	4	–	4	–	0	5	–	5	–	0
Auburn	2	–	4	–	2	2	–	4	–	3
Ole Miss	2	–	4	–	0	4	–	5	–	1
Florida	1	–	4	–	1	4	–	5	–	1
Georgia	1	–	4	–	1	4	–	6	–	1
Mississippi State	0	–	6	–	0	0	–	8	–	1
$ – Conference champion; Rankings from AP Poll

The 1949 Tennessee Volunteers represented the University of Tennessee in the 1949 college football season. Playing as a member of the Southeastern Conference (SEC), the team was led by head coach Robert Neyland, in his 18th year, and played their home games at Shields–Watkins Field in Knoxville, Tennessee. They finished the season with a record of seven wins, two losses, and one tie (7–2–1 overall, 4–1–1 in the SEC).

== Schedule ==
Date	Opponent	Rank	Site	Result	Attendance	Source
September 24	Mississippi State		Shields–Watkins Field; Knoxville, TN (rivalry)	W 10–0	32,000	
October 1	Duke*		Shields–Watkins Field; Knoxville, TN	L 7–21	40,000	
October 8	Chattanooga*		Shields–Watkins Field; Knoxville, TN	W 39–7	15,000	
October 15	at Alabama		Legion Field; Birmingham, AL (Third Saturday in October)	T 7–7	41,000	
October 22	Tennessee Tech*		Shields–Watkins Field; Knoxville, TN	W 36–6	10,000	
October 29	at No. 13 North Carolina*		Kenan Memorial Stadium; Chapel Hill, NC	W 35–6		
November 5	Georgia Tech^{†}	No. 14	Shields–Watkins Field; Knoxville, TN	L 13–30	45,000	
November 12	vs. Ole Miss		Crump Stadium; Memphis, TN (rivalry)	W 35–7	28,054	
November 19	at No. 11 Kentucky		McLean Stadium; Lexington, KY (rivalry)	W 6–0	38,000	
November 26	Vanderbilt	No. 18	Shields–Watkins Field; Knoxville, TN (rivalry)	W 26–20	42,000	
*Non-conference game; ^{†}Homecoming; Rankings from AP Poll released prior to the game

== Rankings ==
Ranking movements Legend: ██ Increase in ranking ██ Decrease in ranking — = Not ranked
	Week								
Poll	1	2	3	4	5	6	7	8	Final
AP	—	—	—	—	14	—	—	18	17

== Team players drafted into the NFL ==
Player	Position	Round	Pick	NFL club
Norm Messeroll	Tackle	15	185	New York Yankees
