= Al Lary =

American baseball player (1928–2001)

- Pitcher
- Born: September 26, 1928; Northport, Alabama, U.S.
- Died: July 9, 2001 (aged 72); Northport, Alabama, U.S.
- Batted: Right Threw: Right

MLB debut
- September 6, 1954, for the Chicago Cubs

Last MLB appearance
- September 15, 1962, for the Chicago Cubs

MLB statistics
- Win–loss record: 0–1
- Earned run average: 6.53
- Strikeouts: 22
- Innings pitched: 40
- Stats at Baseball Reference

Teams
- Chicago Cubs (1954–1955, 1962)

Alfred Allen Lary (September 26, 1928 – July 9, 2001) was an American professional baseball player. He was a right-handed pitcher who appeared in 29 games — 16 as a pitcher, 12 as a pinch runner and one as a pinch hitter — for the Chicago Cubs of Major League Baseball from 1954 to 1955 and again in 1962. Prior to playing professional baseball, Lary had an outstanding college football career at the University of Alabama. He was the older brother of Detroit Tigers' All-Star pitcher Frank Lary.

Lary was listed as 6 feet 3 inches (1.91 m) tall and 185 pounds (84 kg). He signed his first contract with the Cubs before the 1951 season, spent 1953 in military service, and made his Major League debut on September 25, 1954, starting against the Cincinnati Redlegs at Wrigley Field. The opposing pitcher was Art Fowler. Lary pitched six innings and allowed two earned runs, receiving no decision in the 4–2 Cubs victory. He was with the Cubs briefly in 1955 and was used in four games, all as a pinch runner. It would be seven years before he reached the Major League level again.

Lary gave up Willie Mays' 324th career home run, a grand slam, in Candlestick Park on April 28, 1962. His career totals for his 16 career games pitched include a win–loss record of 0–1, four games started, four games finished, and an ERA of 6.52. In 40 innings pitched he struck out 22, walked 22, and allowed 45 hits. He spent his entire, 13-year baseball career as a member of the Cubs' organization.

Lary died by accidental drowning in his hometown of Northport, Alabama, at the age of 72. Lary had Parkinson's disease at the time of his death.

== See also ==
- Alabama Crimson Tide football yearly statistical leaders
