= 1949 Georgia Bulldogs football team =

American college football season

1949 Georgia Bulldogs football
- Conference: Southeastern Conference
- Record: 4–6–1 (1–4–1 SEC)
- Head coach: Wally Butts (11th season)
- Home stadium: Sanford Stadium

1949 Southeastern Conference football standings
	Conf.					Overall
Team	W		L		T	W		L		T
Tulane $	5	–	1	–	0	7	–	2	–	1
No. 11 Kentucky	4	–	1	–	0	9	–	3	–	0
No. 17 Tennessee	4	–	1	–	1	7	–	2	–	1
Georgia Tech	5	–	2	–	0	7	–	3	–	0
No. 9 LSU	4	–	2	–	0	8	–	3	–	0
Alabama	4	–	3	–	1	6	–	3	–	1
Vanderbilt	4	–	4	–	0	5	–	5	–	0
Auburn	2	–	4	–	2	2	–	4	–	3
Ole Miss	2	–	4	–	0	4	–	5	–	1
Florida	1	–	4	–	1	4	–	5	–	1
Georgia	1	–	4	–	1	4	–	6	–	1
Mississippi State	0	–	6	–	0	0	–	8	–	1
$ – Conference champion; Rankings from AP Poll

The 1949 Georgia Bulldogs football team was an American football team that represented the University of Georgia as a member of the Southeastern Conference (SEC) during the 1949 college football season. In their 11th year under head coach Wally Butts, the team compiled an overall record of 4–6–1, with a mark of 1–4–1 in conference play, placing 11th in the SEC.

== Schedule ==
Date	Opponent	Site	Result	Attendance	Source
September 16	Furman*	Sanford Stadium; Athens, GA	W 25–0	15,000	
September 23	Chattanooga*	Sanford Stadium; Athens, GA	W 42–6	12,500	
October 1	at North Carolina*	Kenan Memorial Stadium; Chapel Hill, NC	L 14–21	44,000	
October 8	at No. 15 Kentucky	McLean Stadium; Lexington, KY	L 0–25	36,000	
October 14	LSU	Sanford Stadium; Athens, GA	W 7–0	22,000	
October 21	at Miami (FL)*	Burdine Stadium; Miami, FL	L 9–13	37,138	
October 29	Alabama^{†}	Sanford Stadium; Athens, GA (rivalry)	L 7–14	35,000	
November 5	vs. Florida	Fairfield Stadium; Jacksonville, FL (rivalry)	L 7–28	36,500	
November 12	vs. Auburn	Memorial Stadium; Columbus, GA (rivalry)	T 20–20	22,000	
November 19	Duquesne*	Sanford Stadium; Athens, GA	W 40–0		
November 26	at Georgia Tech	Grant Field; Atlanta, GA (rivalry)	L 6–7	40,000	
*Non-conference game; ^{†}Homecoming; Rankings from AP Poll released prior to the game
