= 1949 Auburn Tigers football team =

American college football season

1949 Auburn Tigers football
- Conference: Southeastern Conference
- Record: 2–4–3 (2–4–2 SEC)
- Head coach: Earl Brown (2nd season)
- Home stadium: Cliff Hare Stadium; Cramton Bowl; Ladd Memorial Stadium

1949 Southeastern Conference football standings
	Conf.					Overall
Team	W		L		T	W		L		T
Tulane $	5	–	1	–	0	7	–	2	–	1
No. 11 Kentucky	4	–	1	–	0	9	–	3	–	0
No. 17 Tennessee	4	–	1	–	1	7	–	2	–	1
Georgia Tech	5	–	2	–	0	7	–	3	–	0
No. 9 LSU	4	–	2	–	0	8	–	3	–	0
Alabama	4	–	3	–	1	6	–	3	–	1
Vanderbilt	4	–	4	–	0	5	–	5	–	0
Auburn	2	–	4	–	2	2	–	4	–	3
Ole Miss	2	–	4	–	0	4	–	5	–	1
Florida	1	–	4	–	1	4	–	5	–	1
Georgia	1	–	4	–	1	4	–	6	–	1
Mississippi State	0	–	6	–	0	0	–	8	–	1
$ – Conference champion; Rankings from AP Poll

The 1949 Auburn Tigers football team represented Auburn University in the 1949 college football season. It was the Tigers' 58th overall and 17th season as a member of the Southeastern Conference (SEC). The team was led by head coach Earl Brown, in his second year, and played their home games at Cliff Hare Stadium in Auburn, the Cramton Bowl in Montgomery and Ladd Memorial Stadium in Mobile, Alabama. They finished the season with a record of two wins, four losses and three ties (2–4–3 overall, 2–4–2 in the SEC).

== Schedule ==
Date	Opponent	Site	Result	Attendance	Source
September 23	Ole Miss	Cramton Bowl; Montgomery, AL	L 7–40	17,000	
October 8	Florida	Ladd Memorial Stadium; Mobile, AL (rivalry)	T 14–14	11,750	
October 15	at Georgia Tech	Grant Field; Atlanta, GA (rivalry)	L 21–35	32,000	
October 22	at No. 20 Tulane	Tulane Stadium; New Orleans, Louisiana (rivalry)	L 6–14	23,000	
October 29	at Vanderbilt	Dudley Field; Nashville, TN	L 7–26	25,000	
November 5	Mississippi State^{†}	Cliff Hare Stadium; Auburn, AL	W 25–6	20,000	
November 12	vs. Georgia	Memorial Stadium; Columbus, GA (rivalry)	T 20–20	22,000	
November 26	Clemson*	Ladd Memorial Stadium; Mobile, AL	T 20–20	14,000	
December 3	vs. Alabama	Legion Field; Birmingham, AL (Iron Bowl)	W 14–13	44,000	
*Non-conference game; ^{†}Homecoming; Rankings from AP Poll released prior to the game
