= 1949 Ole Miss Rebels football team =

American college football season

1949 Ole Miss Rebels football
- Conference: Southeastern Conference
- Record: 4–5–1 (2–4 SEC)
- Head coach: Johnny Vaught (3rd season)
- Home stadium: Hemingway Stadium

1949 Southeastern Conference football standings
	Conf.					Overall
Team	W		L		T	W		L		T
Tulane $	5	–	1	–	0	7	–	2	–	1
No. 11 Kentucky	4	–	1	–	0	9	–	3	–	0
No. 17 Tennessee	4	–	1	–	1	7	–	2	–	1
Georgia Tech	5	–	2	–	0	7	–	3	–	0
No. 9 LSU	4	–	2	–	0	8	–	3	–	0
Alabama	4	–	3	–	1	6	–	3	–	1
Vanderbilt	4	–	4	–	0	5	–	5	–	0
Auburn	2	–	4	–	2	2	–	4	–	3
Ole Miss	2	–	4	–	0	4	–	5	–	1
Florida	1	–	4	–	1	4	–	5	–	1
Georgia	1	–	4	–	1	4	–	6	–	1
Mississippi State	0	–	6	–	0	0	–	8	–	1
$ – Conference champion; Rankings from AP Poll

The 1949 Ole Miss Rebels football team was an American football team that represented the University of Mississippi as a member of the Southeastern Conference (SEC) during the 1949 college football season. In their third year under head coach Johnny Vaught, the team compiled an overall record of 4–5–1, with a mark of 2–4 in conference play, placing ninth in the SEC.

== Schedule ==
Date	Opponent	Site	Result	Attendance	Source
September 16	at Memphis State*	Crump Stadium; Memphis, TN (rivalry)	W 40–7	12,578	
September 23	at Auburn	Cramton Bowl; Montgomery, AL (rivalry	W 40–7	17,000	
October 1	Kentucky	Hemingway Stadium; Oxford, MS	L 0–47		
October 8	at Vanderbilt	Dudley Field; Nashville, TN (rivalry)	L 27–28		
October 14	at Boston College*	Braves Field; Boston, MA	T 25–25	20,103	
October 22	at TCU*	Amon G. Carter Stadium; Fort Worth, TX	L 27–33		
October 29	at No. 17 LSU	Tiger Stadium; Baton Rouge, LA (rivalry )	L 7–34		
November 5	Chattanooga*	Hemingway Stadium; Oxford, MS	W 47–27		
November 12	Tennessee	Crump Stadium; Memphis, TN (rivalry)	L 7–35		
November 26	at Mississippi State	Scott Field; Starkville, MS (Egg Bowl)	W 26–0	32,000	
*Non-conference game; Rankings from AP Poll released prior to the game

== Roster ==
1949 Ole Miss Rebels football team roster
Players
Coaches
Offense

Pos.	#	Name	Class
HB		John Dottley
E		Jackie Poole
E		Jack Stribling

Defense

Pos.	#	Name	Class

Special teams

Pos.	#	Name	Class

Head coach

- Johnny Vaught

Coordinators/assistant coaches

Legend

- (C) Team captain
- (S) Suspended
- (I) Ineligible
- Injured
- Redshirt
