= Tuscaloosa Warriors =

American football team in Alabama

- Founded: 1963
- League: Southern Professional Football League
- Team history: Tuscaloosa Warriors; 1963
- Based in: Tuscaloosa, Alabama
- Arena: Tuscaloosa County High School Stadium; Denny Stadium
- Owner: Eddie Brightwell
- Head coach: Bobby Jackson; Bobby Luna
- Championships: none

The Tuscaloosa Warriors were a professional American football team based in Tuscaloosa, Alabama, and were members of the Southern Professional Football League (SPFL). The Warriors were under the ownership of Eddie Brightwell with both Bobby Jackson and Bobby Luna serving as player-coaches. For their lone 1963 season, the Warriors compiled an 8-7 record with home games being played at both Tuscaloosa County High School Stadium and Denny Stadium. Due to low home attendance, in May 1964 team ownership announced the franchise would be relocated to Columbus, Mississippi and compete as the Columbus Warriors for the 1964 season.

== All-time results ==
The Warriors regular season schedule was released in June 1963 All non-league games are marked with an asterisk (*).

Week	Date	Opponent	Results		Game Site	Reference
Week	Date	Opponent	Final score	Team record	Game Site	Reference
1	August 3	Rome Bisons	W 42-0	1–0	Tuscaloosa County High School Stadium	
2	August 10	Orlando Broncos	W 29-7	2–0	Tuscaloosa County High School Stadium	
3	August 17	at Jacksonville Robins	L 0-27	2–1	Gator Bowl Stadium	
4	August 24	at Rome Bisons	W 21-19	3-1		
5	August 31	at Orlando Broncos	L	3-2		
6	September 7	Gadsden Raiders	W 10-7	4-2	Tuscaloosa County High School Stadium	
7	September 14	at Gadsden Raiders	W 42-14	5-2	Attalla Stadium	
8	September 21	at Atlanta Spartans*	W 12-7	6-2		
9	September 28	Chattanooga Cherokees	W 14-7	7-2	Tuscaloosa County High School Stadium	
10	October 5	Huntsville Rockets	L 23-26	7-3	Tuscaloosa County High School Stadium	
11	October 13	at Daytona Beach Thunderbirds	L 21-31	7-4		
12	October 19	at Huntsville Rockets	W 7-0	8-4		
13	October 26	at Chattanooga Cherokees	L 12-24	8-5		
14	November 2	Jacksonville Robins	L 14-19	8-6	at Mobile	
15	November 9	Daytona Beach Thunderbirds	L 6-50	8-7	Denny Stadium	
