= Wayne Wheeler (American football) =

American football player (born 1950)

No. 85
- Position: Wide receiver

Personal information
- Born: March 28, 1950 (age 76); Orlando, Florida, U.S.
- Listed height: 6 ft 2 in (1.88 m)
- Listed weight: 185 lb (84 kg)

Career information
- High school: William R. Boone (Orlando, Florida)
- College: Alabama
- NFL draft: 1974: 3rd round, 54th overall pick

Career history
- Chicago Bears (1974); Birmingham Vulcans (1975); Tampa Bay Buccaneers (1976)*
- * Offseason or practice squad member only

Awards and highlights
- National champion (1973); First-team All-American (1973); 2× First-team All-SEC (1972, 1973)

Career NFL statistics
- Games played: 12
- Receptions: 5
- Receiving yards: 59
- Receiving touchdowns: 1
- Stats at Pro Football Reference

Wayne B. Wheeler Jr. (born March 28, 1950) is an American former professional football player who was a wide receiver for the Chicago Bears in the National Football League (NFL). He played college football for the Alabama Crimson Tide. He also played for the Birmingham Vulcans of the World Football League (WFL).

== Early life and education ==
=== High school ===
Wheeler attended and played high school football at William R. Boone High School. He was a running back as a sophomore. Then, later on, got shifted to being a wide receiver.

=== College ===
Wheeler attended and played college football at The University of Alabama from 1971–1973. When he was a junior, he broke David Bailey's 'wishbone receiving record'. In his collegiate career, he had 55 receptions for 1246 yards and 11 receiving touchdowns.

== Professional career ==
=== Chicago Bears ===
Wheeler was selected by the Chicago Bears in the third round of the 1974 NFL draft. In week 13 of his rookie season, he caught a 19-yard pass for a touchdown against the San Diego Chargers. This was his first and only season in the NFL, playing 12 games and missing 2 games due to sickness and injuries, including a broken foot during the pre-season.

=== Birmingham Vulcans ===
After the 1974 NFL season, Wheeler moved on to the newly-formed World Football League, signing with the Vulcans for the 1975 season. He was cut from the team on October 8, 1975, after playing 3 games. He still recorded 3 receptions for 57 yards with his longest reception being 24 yards.

=== Tampa Bay Buccaneers ===
Wheeler was invited to the Tampa Bay Buccaneers training camp in the 1976 NFL off-season. He played a pre-season game against the Los Angeles Rams on July 31, 1976. However, he did not make the team. That marked the end of his career.

== See also ==
- Alabama Crimson Tide football yearly statistical leaders
