= Bobby Marlow =

American and Canadian football player (1930–1985)

Personal information
- Born: February 8, 1930; Athens, Alabama, U.S.
- Died: June 5, 1985 (aged 55)

Career information
- High school: Troy
- College: University of Alabama
- NFL draft: 1953: 1st round, 8th overall pick

Career history
- Saskatchewan Roughriders

Robert R. Marlow (February 8, 1930 – June 5, 1985) was an American and Canadian football running back who played for the University of Alabama and the Canadian Football League's (CFL) Saskatchewan Roughriders.

== Biography ==
Born on February 8, 1930, in Athens, Alabama, Marlow moved to Troy at an early age. He played high school football at Troy High School before playing college football for the University of Alabama from 1950 to 1952. In 1950, Marlow's first season with the Crimson Tide, he had 118 rushing attempts, gaining 882 yards for an average of 7.5 per carry, and scored 9 touchdowns. His number of touchdowns doubled to 12 in 1951, as he rushed for 728 yards in 114 carries. In that year's Iron Bowl against Auburn, Marlow had 233 rushing yards, breaking the team record; his mark was not bested until 1987. In 1952, he was named to the All-America Team, after running for 950 yards in 176 attempts and scoring 10 touchdowns. It was the third consecutive season that he led Alabama in rushing yards. In Marlow's Crimson Tide career, the team had a win–loss record of 24–10 and won the 1953 Orange Bowl. At the end of his college career, Marlow had a school-record 2,560 rushing yards. The record lasted until 1971.

The New York Giants selected Marlow with the eighth overall pick in the first round of the 1953 NFL draft. However, he did not play in the NFL, and instead signed to play in the CFL. The Roughriders ultimately signed Marlow. In his career with the Roughriders, he scored 34 touchdowns and had 4,291 rushing yards in 833 attempts. Marlow spent eight seasons in Canada, and later lived in Elkmont, Alabama, and Houston, Texas. In 1985, Marlow suffered a heart attack and died at the age of 55. Marlow was named a member of the CFL's All Star All-Time Team.

== See also ==
- Alabama Crimson Tide football yearly statistical leaders
