= Tuscaloosa County High School (historical) =

Coordinates: 33°13′59.1″N 87°34′45.87″W

Tuscaloosa County High School original building was completed in 1926. The first graduating class was summer of 1927. The Principal was Dr. Houston Cole, who later became President of Jacksonville State University.

The first student government for the school was organized in 1928. Hiram Darden was the first president. Secretary for that class was Inez Deal. The treasurer was Dan Whitson.

Built as a high school for the county, many rural county schools were closed. Due to this school being built, a county wide school busing system was enacted. Students were bused from many miles away in the county to the school. Students came from south, north and west rural sections of the county. Many of them from south Tuscaloosa County were bused across the City of Tuscaloosa to get to County High.

During the 1940s, the school building was the high point in local political rallies. Political rallies were held all across the county and only a few days before the election, a big county wide political rally was at County High

Alabama's first female Governor, Lurleen Burns Wallace, was a student.

County High was last used in December 2000. A new school about five miles north was completed and all functions of the school were transferred to the new school over the school break.
