= Tom Calvin =

American football player (1926–2020)

No. 35
- Position: Halfback

Personal information
- Born: June 13, 1926; Athens, Alabama, U.S.
- Died: January 22, 2020 (aged 93); Decatur, Alabama, U.S.
- Listed height: 6 ft 0 in (1.83 m)
- Listed weight: 200 lb (91 kg)

Career information
- High school: Athens
- College: Alabama (1947–1950)
- NFL draft: 1951: 25th round, 298th overall pick

Career history
- Pittsburgh Steelers (1952–1955)

Career NFL statistics
- Rushing yards: 136
- Rushing average: 4.3
- Receptions: 7
- Receiving yards: 51
- Stats at Pro Football Reference

Thomas Marvin Calvin (June 13, 1926 – January 22, 2020) was an American professional football halfback in the National Football League (NFL). Calvin played college football for the University of Alabama. He was drafted by the Pittsburgh Steelers in the 25th round (298th overall) of the 1951 NFL draft. He played for the Steelers for four seasons (1952–1955).

== See also ==
- Alabama Crimson Tide football yearly statistical leaders
