= Ed Salem =

American football player (1928–2001)

No. 26, 87
- Positions: Defensive back, quarterback

Personal information
- Born: August 28, 1928; Tucson, Arizona, U.S.
- Died: December 21, 2001 (aged 73); Birmingham, Alabama, U.S.
- Listed height: 5 ft 11 in (1.80 m)
- Listed weight: 190 lb (86 kg)

Career information
- High school: Ramsay (Birmingham)
- College: Alabama
- NFL draft: 1951: 2nd round, 15th overall pick

Career history
- Washington Redskins (1951); Montreal Alouettes (1952)

Awards and highlights
- First-team All-American (1950); First-team All-SEC (1950); Second-team All-SEC (1949)

Career NFL statistics
- TDs-INTs: 0-2
- Interceptions caught: 5
- Stats at Pro Football Reference

Edward Joseph Salem (August 28, 1928 – December 21, 2001) was an American professional football player who was a quarterback and defensive back. He was a 1950 College Football All-America Team selection from the University of Alabama Crimson Tide and played one season for the National Football League (NFL)'s Washington Redskins and one season for the Canadian Football League (CFL)'s Montreal Alouettes.

Salem was born in Tucson, Arizona, and arrived in Tuscaloosa, Alabama, to play for Harold Drew's Crimson Tide at a time when they were still rising to national prominence. He starred on all sides of the ball. As a quarterback he was the team's top passer in 1948, 1949 and 1950. He was also the Tide's leading rusher in 1948 and top scorer in 1948 and 1949, a season in which he also led the team in interceptions. In 1950, he was the Tide's top punt returner. In Alabama's 55–0 victory over rival Auburn University in the 1948 Iron Bowl he threw for three touchdowns, rushed for another, and kicked seven extra points. Alabama's athletics staff named him one of the Tide's 50 best players in history in 1992.

The Washington Redskins made Salem the 15th player selected overall in the second round of the 1951 NFL draft. He played one year for the Redskins, recording five interceptions on defense. For the following season he signed with the Montreal Alouettes, making his mark there by kicking what was then a league record field goal of 53 yards (48 m)

After leaving professional football, Salem moved to Birmingham, Alabama and opened the first "Ed Salem's Drive-In" on what became a noted cruising strip on the section of the Bee Line Highway between Birmingham and North Birmingham. He later expanded with additional locations in the Lakeview neighborhood. Ed Salem's Drive-In #3, formerly Eli's Drive-In, was the site of WSGN's famed "Sky Castle" deejay booth, where the station's "Good Guys" evening rock and roll deejays would take live requests.

In addition to his restaurants, Salem opened a travel agency and several bowling alleys and acted as a real estate developer. He died in 2001.

Salem was inducted into the Alabama Sports Hall of Fame in the Class of 2010.

== See also ==
- Alabama Crimson Tide football yearly statistical leaders
