= Northport, Alabama =

City in Alabama, United States

- City
- City of Northport
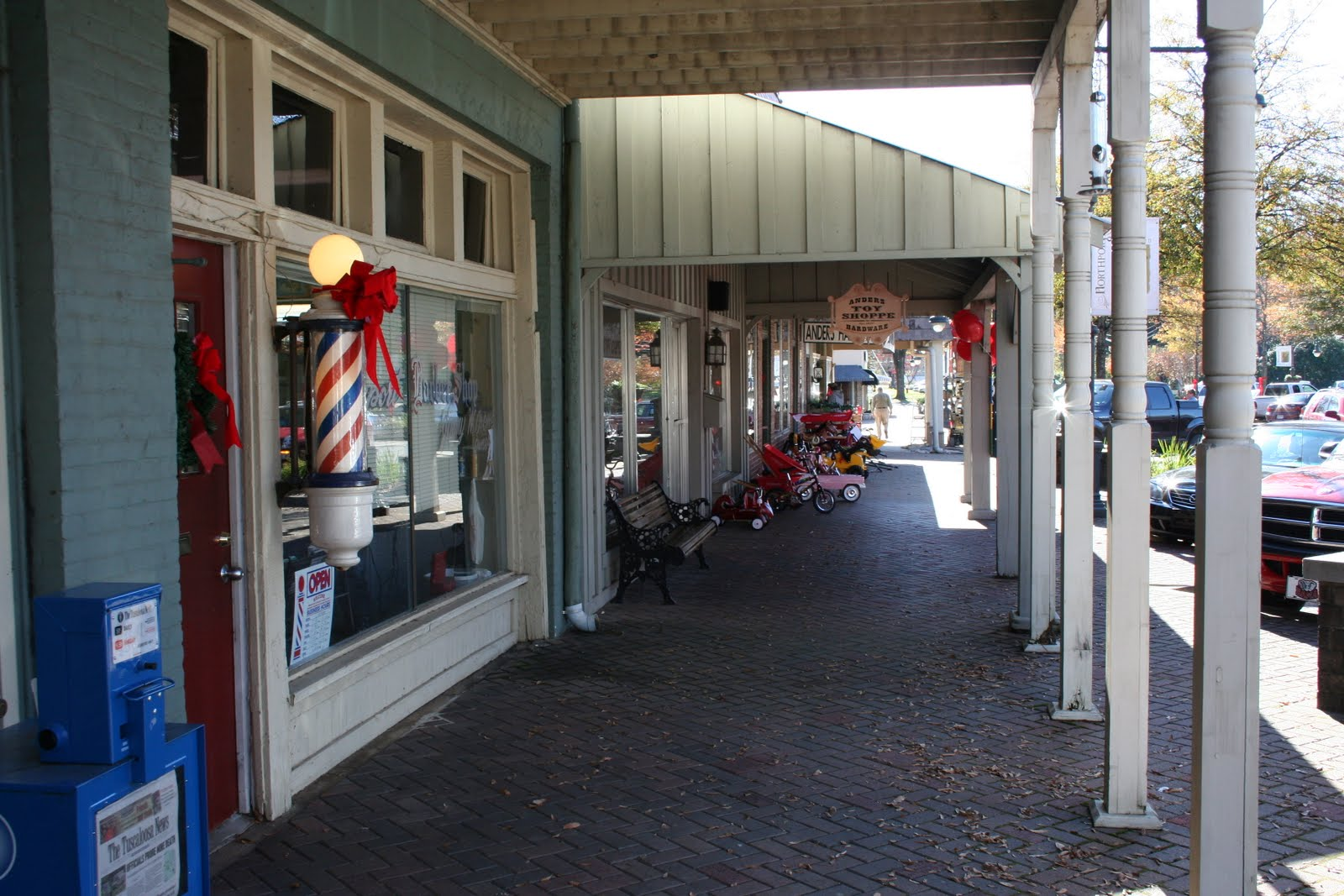
- A view of Downtown Northport

- Location of Northport in Tuscaloosa County, Alabama.
- Coordinates: 33°15′32″N 87°36′52″W
- Country: United States
- State: Alabama
- County: Tuscaloosa

Area
  - City: 17.88 sq mi (46.30 km^{2})
  - Land: 17.49 sq mi (45.29 km^{2})
  - Water: 0.39 sq mi (1.01 km^{2})
- Elevation: 325 ft (99 m)

Population (2020)
  - City: 31,125
  - Density: 1,780.0/sq mi (687.25/km^{2})
  - Metro: 235,628 (US: 190th)
- Time zone: UTC-6 (Central (CST))
  - Summer (DST): UTC-5 (CDT)
- ZIP codes: 35473, 35475, 35476
- Area codes: 205 & 659
- FIPS code: 01-55200
- GNIS feature ID: 2404400
- Website: www.northportal.gov

Northport is a city in Tuscaloosa County in the west central part of the State of Alabama. Located on the Black Warrior River across from downtown Tuscaloosa, it is currently the 17th most populous city in Alabama with a population of 31,125 in the 2020 census. It incorporated in 1871. It is part of the Tuscaloosa metropolitan area.

== Geography ==
As Northport is adjacent to the larger city of Tuscaloosa, many residents work in Tuscaloosa or other parts of Tuscaloosa County. Although the two cities share a land boundary, much of their boundary (and historically all of the boundary) is the Black Warrior River. The cities of Tuscaloosa and Northport grew at the historical head of navigation at the fall line between the Appalachian Highlands (specifically, the Cumberland Plateau) and the Gulf Coastal Plain, with Northport on the north bank of the river.

According to the U.S. Census Bureau, the city has a total area of 17.66 square miles (45.7 km^{2}), of which 17.46 square miles (45.2 km^{2}) is land and 0.2 square miles (0.52 km^{2}) (1.13%) is water.

== Demographics ==
=== 2020 census ===
As of the 2020 census, Northport had a population of 31,125. The median age was 36.1 years. 24.3% of residents were under the age of 18 and 16.0% of residents were 65 years of age or older. For every 100 females there were 86.7 males, and for every 100 females age 18 and over there were 83.8 males age 18 and over.

95.7% of residents lived in urban areas, while 4.3% lived in rural areas.

There were 12,467 households in Northport, of which 33.3% had children under the age of 18 living in them. Of all households, 43.7% were married-couple households, 18.6% were households with a male householder and no spouse or partner present, and 33.5% were households with a female householder and no spouse or partner present. About 29.9% of all households were made up of individuals and 10.5% had someone living alone who was 65 years of age or older.

There were 13,382 housing units, of which 6.8% were vacant. The homeowner vacancy rate was 2.4% and the rental vacancy rate was 7.8%.

Racial composition as of the 2020 census
Race	Number	Percent
White	20,170	64.8%
Black or African American	7,789	25.0%
American Indian and Alaska Native	298	1.0%
Asian	385	1.2%
Native Hawaiian and Other Pacific Islander	21	0.1%
Some other race	1,121	3.6%
Two or more races	1,341	4.3%
Hispanic or Latino (of any race)	2,053	6.6%

Historical population
Census	Pop.	Note	%±
1870	604		—
1880	564		−6.6%
1890	413		−26.8%
1900	424		2.7%
1910	500		17.9%
1920	1,606		221.2%
1930	2,173		35.3%
1940	3,187		46.7%
1950	3,885		21.9%
1960	5,245		35.0%
1970	9,435		79.9%
1980	14,291		51.5%
1990	17,366		21.5%
2000	19,435		11.9%
2010	23,330		20.0%
2020	31,125		33.4%
U.S. Decennial Census

=== 2010 census ===
At the 2010 census, there were 23,330 people, 9,430 households, and 6,060 families living in the city. The population density was 1,597.9 inhabitants per square mile (617.0/km^{2}). There were 10,256 housing units at an average density of 702.5 per square mile (271.2/km^{2}). The racial makeup of the city was 68.4% White, 26.9% Black or African American, 0.3% Native American, 1.1% Asian, 0.3% Pacific Islander, 2.0% from other races, and 1.1% from two or more races. 4.1% of the population were Hispanic or Latino of any race.

Of the 9,430 households 29.3% had children under the age of 18 living with them, 45.2% were married couples living together, 15.3% had a female householder with no husband present, and 35.7% were non-families. 29.6% of households were one person and 9.6% were one person aged 65 or older. The average household size was 2.40 and the average family size was 2.99.

The age distribution was 23.4% under the age of 18, 10.6% from 18 to 24, 29.0% from 25 to 44, 23.0% from 45 to 64, and 14.0% 65 or older. The median age was 34.8 years. For every 100 females, there were 87.0 males. For every 100 females age 18 and over, there were 90.6 males.

The median household income was $49,167 and the median family income was $68,017. Males had a median income of $51,660 versus $36,566 for females. The per capita income for the city was $23,571. About 8.0% of families and 15.4% of the population were below the poverty line, including 14.4% of those under age 18 and 9.9% of those age 65 or over.

=== 2000 census ===
At the 2000 census, there were 19,435 people, 7,844 households, and 5,255 families living in the city. The population density was 1,328.3 inhabitants per square mile (512.9/km^{2}). There were 8,509 housing units at an average density of 581.6 per square mile (224.6/km^{2}). The racial makeup of the city was 71.11% White, 26.03% Black or African American, 0.19% Native American, 0.80% Asian, 0.15% Pacific Islander, 1.02% from other races, and 0.70% from two or more races. 1.92% of the population were Hispanic or Latino of any race.

Of the 7,844 households 32.8% had children under the age of 18 living with them, 48.3% were married couples living together, 15.7% had a female householder with no husband present, and 33.0% were non-families. 28.6% of households were one person and 9.7% were one person aged 65 or older. The average household size was 2.41 and the average family size was 2.98.

The age distribution was 24.9% under the age of 18, 10.5% from 18 to 24, 29.3% from 25 to 44, 21.3% from 45 to 64, and 14.1% 65 or older. The median age was 35 years. For every 100 females, there were 83.9 males. For every 100 females age 18 and over, there were 79.6 males.

The median household income was $40,206 and the median family income was $48,673. Males had a median income of $41,008 versus $26,340 for females. The per capita income for the city was $20,163. About 11.6% of families and 13.9% of the population were below the poverty line, including 20.4% of those under age 18 and 10.6% of those age 65 or over.

== Culture ==
The Kentuck Fine Art Gallery, downtown Northport

One of Northport's cultural activities is the Kentuck Festival of the Arts. Each October, artists gather at Kentuck Park to showcase their work in front of visitors. The festival celebrates folk and contemporary art as well as traditional crafts. Potters, quilters, and basketmakers offer educational craft demonstrations throughout the weekend. “According to the [Kentuck Art] center, the annual two-day festival draws up to 20,000 visitors to the city each year and generates an estimated $5 million economic impact.

Controversially, Kentuck Festival of the Arts’ board of directors announced that its 2024 festival will be held across the Black Warrior River and hosted by the city of Tuscaloosa. This comes after 52 years of the festival being held in Kentuck Park which is now being developed into a sports complex by the city of Northport. The contention between the Northport city council and the art festival's board of directors grew to a breaking point after the city of Northport's decision to decrease funding for Kentuck Festival of the Arts in 2023 and contract adjustments that would allow the city to change the location of the festival with as little as 30 days' notice.

A tradition of Northport is Art Night, which is held on the first Thursday of each month. Many of Northport's art galleries open their doors after hours for this event and art or craft demonstrations are offered. A bus system runs between downtown Northport and downtown Tuscaloosa as a collaboration with Tuscaloosa's Art and Soul event.

Dickens Downtown is held the first Tuesday in December. This annual holiday event attracts participants to come and see the period setting of 19th-century England.

The Northport Heritage Museum houses a collection of artifacts and photographs that documents the history and evolution of the city.

Northport has high hopes of being added to the growing list of cities in Alabama to be in possession of a water park. Construction for the 22-million-dollar project is expected to be completed by 2025. Increasing amounts of local residents have contested the newly identified water park location as it will likely cause noise disturbances, increase traffic congestion, and diminish home values. The long-established farming community is also at risk of being pushed out of the area due to encroachment of the city of Northport's urbanization projects.

== Notable people ==
- Hannah Brown (born 1994), American model, and beauty pageant titleholder
- Curley Hallman, American Football Coach
- Frank Lary (1930–2017), American baseball player
- Le'Ron McClain (born 1984), American football player
- Will Smith (born 1990), NHRA Pro Top Fuel Drag Racer

== Gallery ==
Views of Northport after tornado, 1932

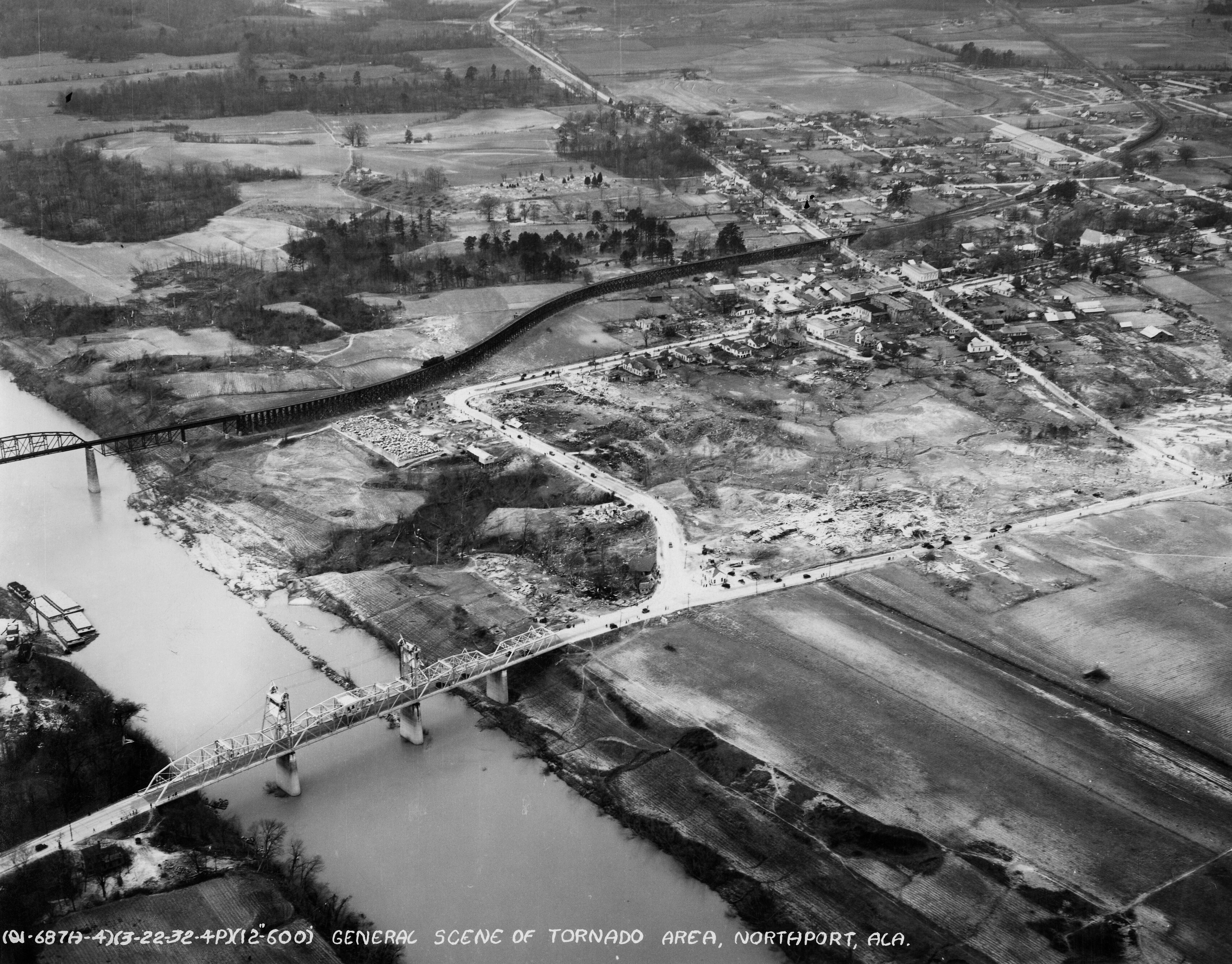
General scene of Tornado

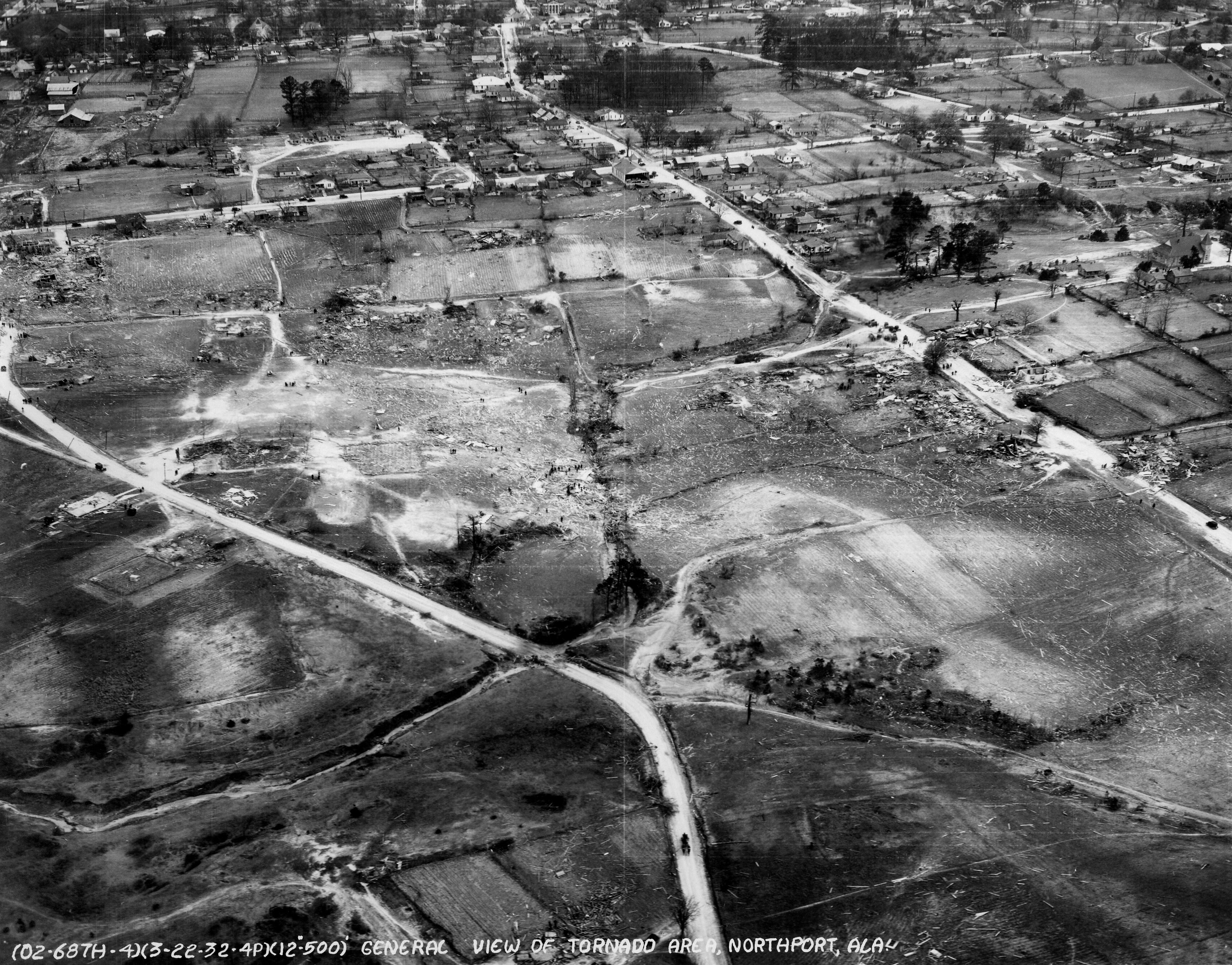
General view of tornado alley

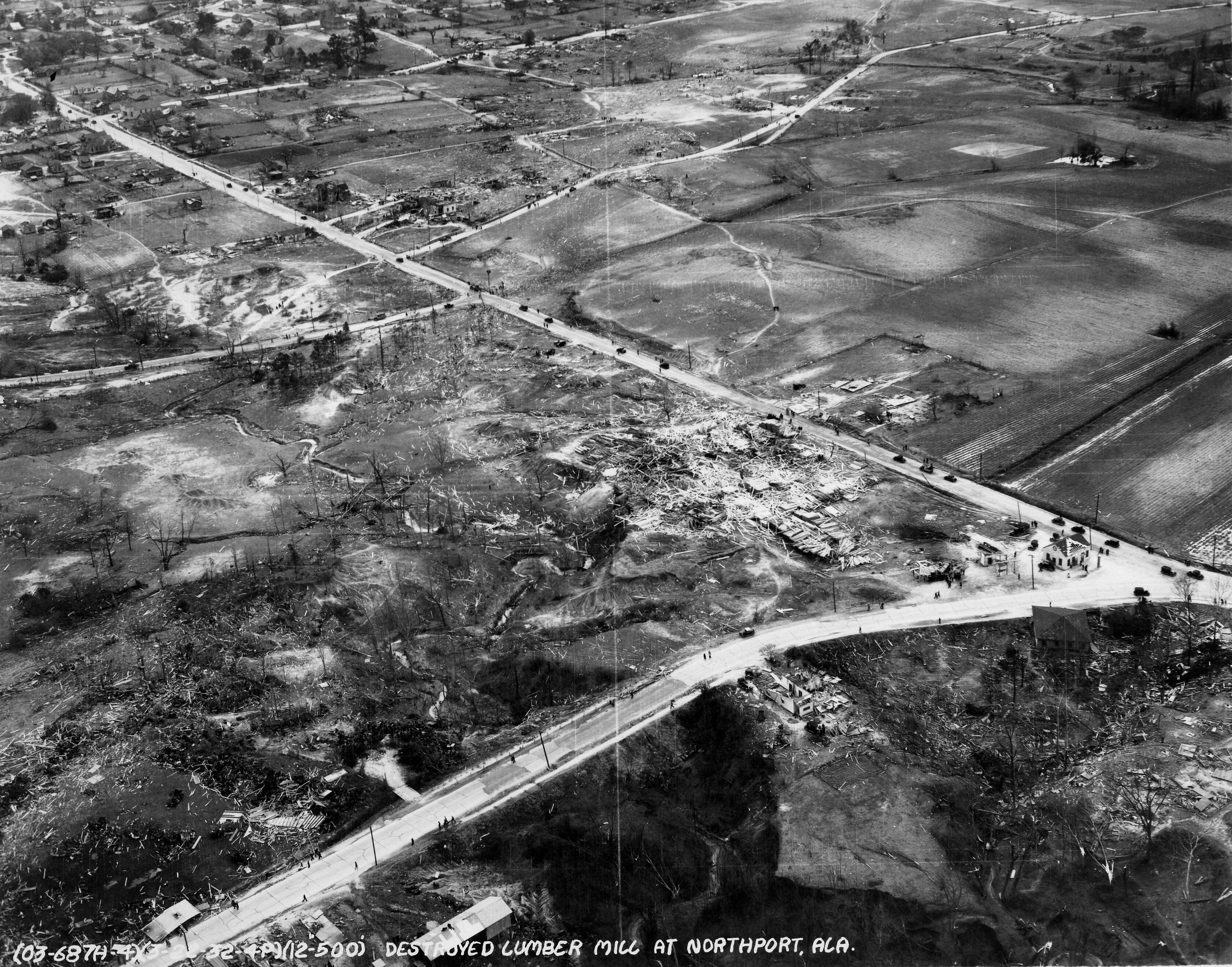
Destroyed lumber mill

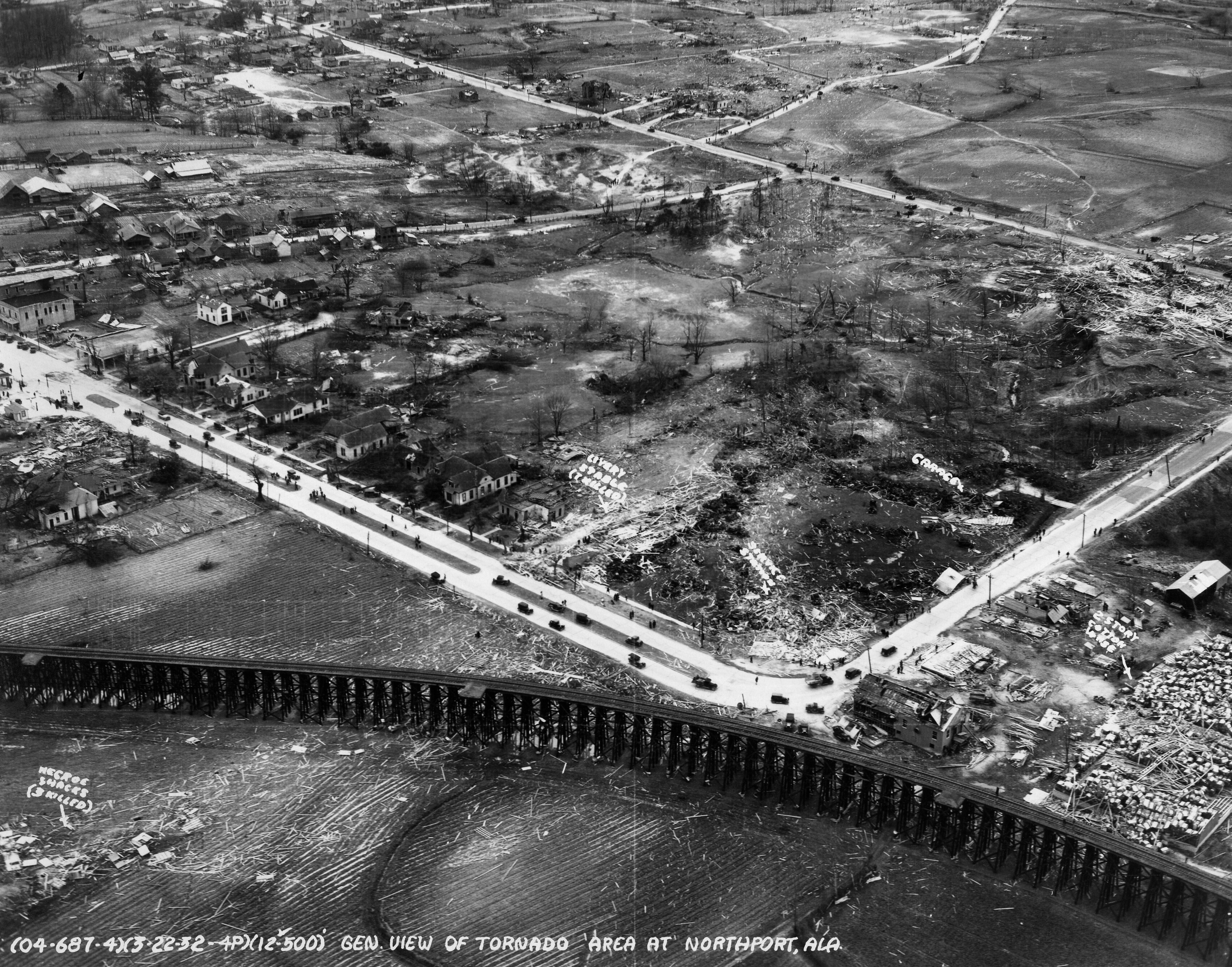
General scene of Tornado
