= Southeastern Conference football individual awards =

American college football awards

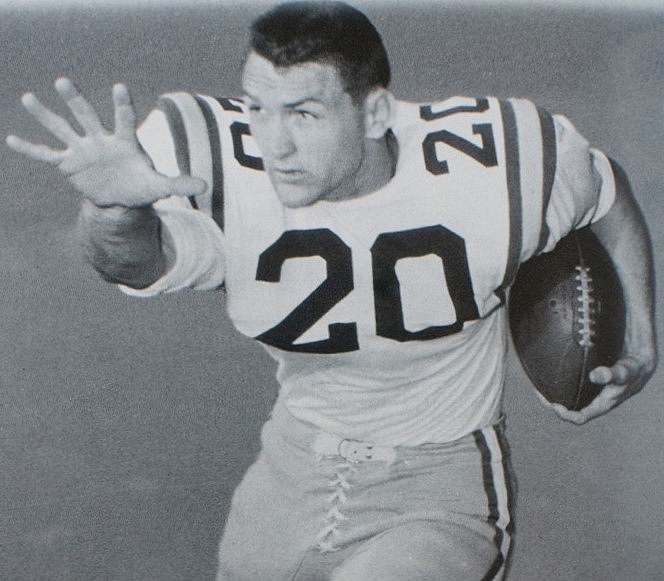
LSU halfback Billy Cannon was SEC Player of the Year for the 1958 and 1959 seasons.

Coaches and media of the Southeastern Conference (SEC) bestow the following individual awards at the end of each college football season.

== Player of the Year ==
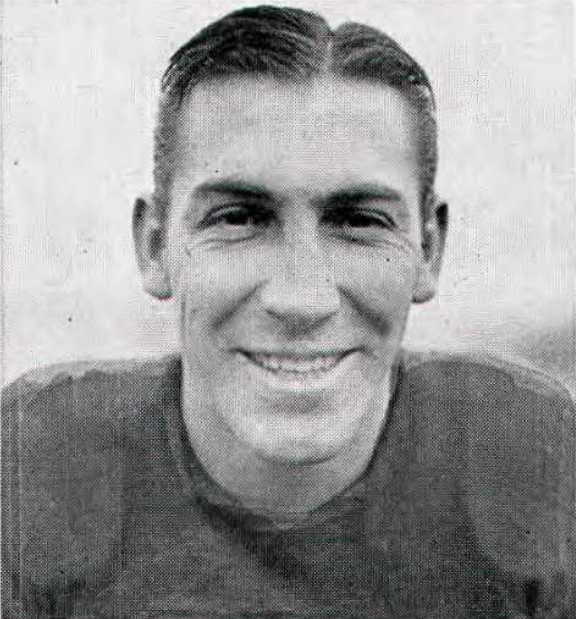
Tennessee halfback Beattie Feathers was the first recipient of the award, for the 1933 season.

A single award was issued for the 1933–2001 seasons, except for 1943 when no award was given due to World War II. Starting in 2002, an offensive and defense award is issued each season; a special teams award was added in 2004. In a few instances, different selectors have chosen different recipients, or two players have shared the award. Several players have won the award twice; Herschel Walker was a three-time recipient (1980–1982).

Only four defensive players were recognized during the single award era: Georgia safety Jake Scott, Tennessee defensive tackle Reggie White, Alabama linebacker Cornelius Bennett and Auburn defensive tackle Tracy Rocker.

Season	Winner	Pos.	Team
1933	Beattie Feathers	HB	Tennessee
1934	Dixie Howell	HB	Alabama
1935	Willie Geny	E	Vanderbilt
1936	Walter Gilbert	C	Auburn
1937	Carl Hinkle	C	Vanderbilt
1938	George Cafego	HB	Tennessee
1939	Ken Kavanaugh	E	LSU
1939	Bob Foxx	HB	Tennessee
1940	Buddy Elrod	E	Mississippi State
1941	Jack Jenkins	FB	Vanderbilt
1942	Frank Sinkwich	HB	Georgia
1943	Not awarded		
1944	Shorty McWilliams	HB	Mississippi State
1945	Harry Gilmer	HB	Alabama
1946	Charley Trippi	HB	Georgia
1947	Charlie Conerly	HB	Ole Miss
1948	John Rauch	QB	Georgia
1949	Travis Tidwell	QB	Auburn
1950	Babe Parilli	QB	Kentucky
1951	Bill Wade	QB	Vanderbilt
1952	Jackie Parker	QB	Mississippi State
1953	Jackie Parker (2)	QB	Mississippi State
1954	Art Davis	HB	Mississippi State
1955	Johnny Majors	HB	Tennessee
1956	Johnny Majors (2)	HB	Tennessee
1957	Lou Michaels	T	Kentucky
1958	Billy Cannon	HB	LSU
1959	Billy Cannon (2)	HB	LSU
1960	Jake Gibbs	QB	Ole Miss
1961	Pat Trammell	QB	Alabama
1962	Jerry Stovall	HB	LSU
1963	Jimmy Sidle	HB	Auburn
1964	Tucker Frederickson	HB	Auburn
1965	Steve Sloan	QB	Alabama
1966	Steve Spurrier	QB	Florida
1967	Bob Goodridge	TE	Vanderbilt
1968	Jake Scott	S	Georgia
1969	Archie Manning	QB	Ole Miss
1970	Pat Sullivan	QB	Auburn
1971	Johnny Musso	RB	Alabama
1972	Terry Davis	QB	Alabama
1973	Sonny Collins	RB	Kentucky
1974	Rockey Felker	QB	Mississippi State
1975	Jimmy DuBose	RB	Florida
1976	Ray Goff	QB	Georgia
1977	Charles Alexander	RB	LSU
1978	Willie McClendon	RB	Georgia
1979	Joe Cribbs	RB	Auburn
1980	Herschel Walker	RB	Georgia
1981	Herschel Walker (2)	RB	Georgia
1982	Herschel Walker (3)	RB	Georgia
1983	Reggie White	DT	Tennessee
1984	Kerwin Bell	QB	Florida
1985	Bo Jackson	RB	Auburn
1986	Cornelius Bennett	LB	Alabama
1987	Wendell Davis	WR	LSU
1988	Tracy Rocker	DT	Auburn
1989	Emmitt Smith	RB	Florida
1990	Shane Matthews	QB	Florida
1991	Shane Matthews (2)	QB	Florida
1992	Garrison Hearst	RB	Georgia
1993	Heath Shuler	QB	Tennessee
1994	Jay Barker	QB	Alabama
1995	Danny Wuerffel	QB	Florida
1996	Danny Wuerffel (2)	QB	Florida
1997	Peyton Manning	QB	Tennessee
1998	Tim Couch	QB	Kentucky
1999	Shaun Alexander	RB	Alabama
2000	Rudi Johnson	RB	Auburn
2001	Rex Grossman	QB	Florida

=== Offensive Player of the Year ===
Season	Winner	Pos.	Team
2002	Artose Pinner	RB	Kentucky
2003	Eli Manning	QB	Ole Miss
2004	Jason Campbell	QB	Auburn
2005	Jay Cutler	QB	Vanderbilt
2006	Darren McFadden	RB	Arkansas
2007	Darren McFadden (2)	RB	Arkansas
2008	Tim Tebow	QB	Florida
2009	Tim Tebow (2) (Note: Selected by the coaches.)	QB	Florida
2009	Mark Ingram II (Note: Selected by the AP.)	RB	Alabama
2010	Cam Newton	QB	Auburn
2011	Trent Richardson	RB	Alabama
2012	Johnny Manziel	QB	Texas A&M
2013	Tre Mason	RB	Auburn
2014	Amari Cooper	WR	Alabama
2015	Derrick Henry	RB	Alabama
2016	Jalen Hurts	QB	Alabama
2017	Kerryon Johnson	RB	Auburn
2018	Tua Tagovailoa	QB	Alabama
2019	Joe Burrow	QB	LSU
2020	DeVonta Smith	WR	Alabama
2021	Bryce Young	QB	Alabama
2022	Hendon Hooker	QB	Tennessee
2023	Jayden Daniels	QB	LSU
2024	Dylan Sampson	RB	Tennessee
2025	Diego Pavia	QB	Vanderbilt

=== Defensive Player of the Year ===
Season	Winner	Pos.	Team
2002	David Pollack	DE	Georgia
2003	Chad Lavalais	DT	LSU
2004	David Pollack (2)	DE	Georgia
2005	DeMeco Ryans	LB	Alabama
2006	Patrick Willis	LB	Ole Miss
2007	Glenn Dorsey	DT	LSU
2008	Eric Berry	S	Tennessee
2009	Rolando McClain	LB	Alabama
2010	Nick Fairley	DT	Auburn
2011	Morris Claiborne	CB	LSU
2011	Tyrann Mathieu	CB	LSU
2012	Jadeveon Clowney	DE	South Carolina
2012	Jarvis Jones	LB	Georgia
2013	C. J. Mosley	LB	Alabama
2013	Michael Sam	DE	Missouri
2014	Shane Ray	DE	Missouri
2015	Reggie Ragland	LB	Alabama
2016	Jonathan Allen	DE	Alabama
2017	Roquan Smith	LB	Georgia
2018	Josh Allen	LB	Kentucky
2019	Derrick Brown	DT	Auburn
2020	Patrick Surtain II	CB	Alabama
2021	Will Anderson Jr.	LB	Alabama
2022	Will Anderson Jr. (2)	LB	Alabama
2023	Dallas Turner	LB	Alabama
2023	Nathaniel Watson	LB	Mississippi State
2024	Kyle Kennard	DE	South Carolina
2025	Cashius Howell	DE	Texas A&M

=== Special Teams Player of the Year ===
Season	Winner	Pos.	Team
2004	Cadillac Williams	RS	Auburn
2005	Skyler Green	RS	LSU
2006	John Vaughn	K	Auburn
2007	Felix Jones	RS	Arkansas
2008	Brandon James	RS	Florida
2009	Javier Arenas	RS	Alabama
2010	Patrick Peterson	RS	LSU
2011	Joe Adams	RS	Arkansas
2012	Caleb Sturgis	K	Florida
2012	Ace Sanders	RS	South Carolina
2013	Christion Jones	RS	Alabama
2014	Marcus Murphy	RS	Missouri
2015	Evan Berry	RS	Tennessee
2016	Daniel Carlson	K	Auburn
2017	Daniel Carlson (2)	K	Auburn
2018	Braden Mann	P	Texas A&M
2019	Jaylen Waddle	RS	Alabama
2020	Jake Camarda	P	Georgia
2021	Jameson Williams	RS	Alabama
2021	Velus Jones Jr.	RS	Tennessee
2022	Jack Podlesny	K	Georgia
2023	Will Reichard	K	Alabama
2024	Alex Raynor	K	Kentucky
2025	Tate Sandell	K	Oklahoma

== Jacobs Blocking Trophy ==
Given annually to the conference's best blocker.

Season	Winner	Pos.	Team
1935	Riley Smith	QB	Alabama
1936	Bill May	QB	LSU
1937	Leroy Monsky	G	Alabama
1938	Sam Bartholomew	QB	Tennessee
1939	Sam Bartholomew (2)	QB	Tennessee
1940	Lloyd Cheatham	QB	Auburn
1941	Jack Jenkins	FB	Vanderbilt
1942	Jack Jenkins (2)	FB	Vanderbilt
1943	John Steber	G	Georgia Tech
1944	Billy Bevis		Tennessee
1945	Billy Bevis (2)		Tennessee
1946	Hal Self	QB	Alabama
1947	Buddy Bowen		Ole Miss
1948	Truitt Smith		Mississippi State
1949	Butch Avinger	QB	Alabama
1950	Butch Avinger (2)	QB	Alabama
1951	Jimmy Hahn		Tennessee
1952	John Michels	G	Tennessee
1953	Crawford Mims	G	Ole Miss
1954	Charles Evans		Mississippi State
1955	Paige Cothren	FB	Ole Miss
1956	Stockton Adkins		Tennessee
1957	Stockton Adkins (2)		Tennessee
1958	J. W. Brodnax	FB	LSU
1959	Jim Cartwright		Tennessee
1960	Jim Cartwright (2)		Tennessee
1961	Billy Neighbors	T	Alabama
1962	Butch Wilson	TE	Alabama
1963	Tucker Frederickson	HB	Auburn
1964	Tucker Frederickson (2)	HB	Auburn
1965	Hal Wantland	HB	Tennessee
1966	Cecil Dowdy	OT	Alabama
1967	Bob Johnson	C	Tennessee
1968	Brad Johnson		Georgia
1969	Chip Kell	G	Tennessee
1970	Chip Kell (2)	G	Tennessee
1971	Royce Smith	G	Georgia
1972	John Hannah	G	Alabama
1973	Buddy Brown	G	Alabama
1974	Sylvester Croom	C	Alabama
1975	Randy Johnson	G	Georgia
1976	Warren Bryant	OT	Kentucky
1977	Bob Cryder	G	Alabama
1978	Robert Dugas		LSU
1979	Dwight Stephenson	C	Alabama
1980	Nat Hudson	G	Georgia
1981	Wayne Harris		Mississippi State
1982	Wayne Harris (2)		Mississippi State
1983	Guy McIntyre	OT	Georgia
1984	Lomas Brown	OT	Florida
1985	Peter Anderson	C	Georgia
1986	Wes Neighbors		Alabama
1987	Harry Galbreath	G	Tennessee
1988	Howard Cross	TE	Alabama
1989	Eric Still	G	Tennessee
1990	Antone Davis	OT	Tennessee
1991	Cal Dixon	C	Florida
1992	Everett Lindsay	OT	Ole Miss
1993	Tobie Sheils		Alabama
1994	Jason Odom	OT	Florida
1995	Jason Odom (2)	OT	Florida
1996	Donnie Young		Florida
1997	Alan Faneca	G	LSU
1998	Matt Stinchcomb	OT	Georgia
1999	Chris Samuels	OT	Alabama
2000	Kenyatta Walker	OT	Florida
2001	Kendall Simmons	G	Auburn
2002	Shawn Andrews	OT	Arkansas
2003	Shawn Andrews (2)	OT	Arkansas
2004	Wesley Britt	OT	Alabama
2005	Marcus McNeill	OT	Auburn
2006	Arron Sears	OT	Tennessee
2007	Andre Smith	OT	Alabama
2007	Jonathan Luigs	C	Arkansas
2008	Michael Oher	OT	Ole Miss
2009	Ciron Black	OT	LSU
2010	Lee Ziemba	OT	Auburn
2011	Barrett Jones	G	Alabama
2012	Luke Joeckel	OT	Texas A&M
2013	Jake Matthews	OT	Texas A&M
2014	La'el Collins	OT	LSU
2015	Ryan Kelly	C	Alabama
2015	Sebastian Tretola	G	Arkansas
2016	Cam Robinson	OT	Alabama
2017	Braden Smith	G	Auburn
2018	Jonah Williams	OT	Alabama
2019	Andrew Thomas	OT	Georgia
2020	Alex Leatherwood	OT	Alabama
2020	Landon Dickerson	C	Alabama
2021	Darian Kinnard	OT	Kentucky
2022	Ricky Stromberg	C	Arkansas
2023	Sedrick Van Pran-Granger	C	Georgia
2024	Kelvin Banks Jr.	OT	Texas
2024	Will Campbell	OT	LSU
2025	Kadyn Proctor	OT	Alabama
2025	Trey Zuhn III	OT	Texas A&M

== Freshman of the Year ==
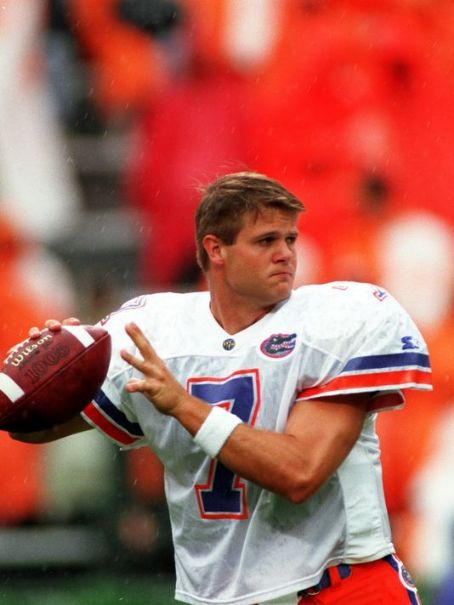
Danny Wuerffel, Freshman of the Year for the 1993 season

Season	Winner	Pos.	Team
1986	Tommy Hodson	QB	LSU
1987	Emmitt Smith	RB	Florida
1988	Not awarded		
1989	Not awarded		
1990	Garrison Hearst	RB	Georgia
1990	James Willis	LB	Auburn
1991	Eric Zeier	QB	Georgia
1992	Steve Taneyhill	QB	South Carolina
1992	Randall Godfrey	LB	Georgia
1993	Danny Wuerffel	QB	Florida
1994	Peyton Manning	QB	Tennessee
1995	Kevin Faulk	RB	LSU
1995	Booger McFarland	DT	LSU
1996	Derick Logan	RB	Kentucky
1997	Jamal Lewis	RB	Tennessee
1998	Quincy Carter	QB	Georgia
1999	Ronney Daniels	WR	Auburn
2000	Jabar Gaffney	WR	Florida
2001	David Greene	QB	Georgia
2002	Kwane Doster	RB	Vanderbilt
2003	Chris Leak	QB	Florida
2004	Ko Simpson	S	South Carolina
2005	Darren McFadden	RB	Arkansas
2006	Percy Harvin	WR	Florida
2007	Knowshon Moreno	RB	Georgia
2008	A. J. Green	WR	Georgia
2008	Julio Jones	WR	Alabama
2009	Warren Norman	RB	Vanderbilt
2010	Marcus Lattimore	RB	South Carolina
2011	Jadeveon Clowney	DE	South Carolina
2011	Isaiah Crowell	RB	Georgia
2012	Johnny Manziel	QB	Texas A&M
2013	Laquon Treadwell	WR	Ole Miss
2013	Alex Collins	RB	Arkansas
2014	Nick Chubb	RB	Georgia
2015	Christian Kirk	WR	Texas A&M
2016	Jalen Hurts	QB	Alabama
2017	Jake Fromm	QB	Georgia
2018	Jaylen Waddle	WR	Alabama
2019	Bo Nix	QB	Auburn
2020	Tank Bigsby	RB	Auburn
2020	Connor Bazelak	QB	Missouri
2021	Brock Bowers	TE	Georgia
2022	Quinshon Judkins	RB	Ole Miss
2023	Caleb Downs	S	Alabama
2024	LaNorris Sellers	QB	South Carolina
2025	Braylon Staley	WR	Tennessee

== Newcomer of the Year ==
The newest SEC individual award, it was added in 2024 to honor the top player in his first season at an SEC program, regardless of academic classification.

Season	Winner	Pos.	Team
2024	Diego Pavia	QB	Vanderbilt
2025	Trinidad Chambliss	QB	Ole Miss
2025	Ahmad Hardy	RB	Missouri

== Coach of the Year ==
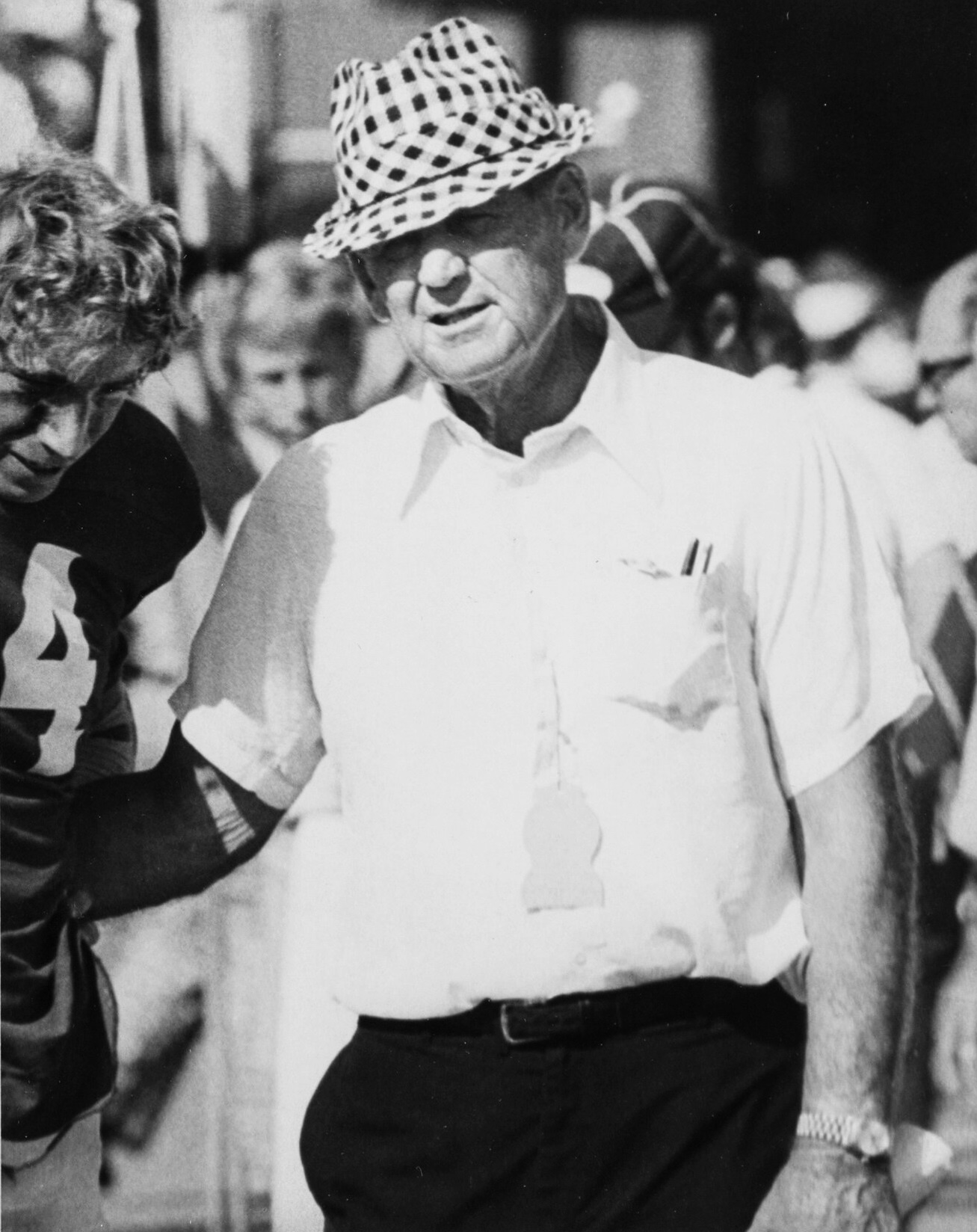
Alabama coach Bear Bryant won the award twelve times.

League coaches have made selections since 1935. The Associated Press (AP) has made selections since 1946. The United Press International (UPI) also made selections from 1960 to 1990.

Conference champion. (Note: Does not include co-championships.)

Season	Winner	Team
1935	Jack Meagher	Auburn
1936	Robert Neyland	Tennessee
1937	Ray Morrison	Vanderbilt
1938	Robert Neyland (2)	Tennessee
1939	William Alexander	Georgia Tech
1940	Allyn McKeen	Mississippi State
1941	Red Sanders	Vanderbilt
1942	Wally Butts	Georgia
1943	Not awarded	
1944	John Barnhill	Tennessee
1945	Frank Thomas	Alabama
1946	Wally Butts (2)	Georgia
1947	Johnny Vaught	Ole Miss
1948	Henry Frnka	Tulane
1948	Johnny Vaught (2)	Ole Miss
1949	Gaynell Tinsley	LSU
1950	Robert Neyland (3)	Tennessee
1950	Bear Bryant	Kentucky
1951	Bobby Dodd	Georgia Tech
1951	Robert Neyland (4)	Tennessee
1952	Harold Drew	Alabama
1952	Bobby Dodd (2)	Georgia Tech
1953	Ralph Jordan	Auburn
1954	Blanton Collier	Kentucky
1954	Johnny Vaught (3)	Ole Miss
1955	Art Guepe	Vanderbilt
1955	Johnny Vaught (4)	Ole Miss
1956	Bowden Wyatt	Tennessee
1957	Wade Walker	Mississippi State
1957	Ralph Jordan (2)	Auburn
1958	Paul Dietzel	LSU
1959	Bear Bryant (2)	Alabama
1959	Wally Butts (3)	Georgia
1960	Ray Graves	Florida
1960	Johnny Vaught (5) (Note: Selected by UPI.)	Ole Miss
1961	Bear Bryant (3)	Alabama
1962	Johnny Vaught (6)	Ole Miss
1963	Ralph Jordan (3)	Auburn
1963	Paul E. Davis	Mississippi State
1964	Bear Bryant (4)	Alabama
1965	Doug Dickey	Tennessee
1965	Bear Bryant (5)	Alabama
1966	Vince Dooley	Georgia
1967	Doug Dickey (2)	Tennessee
1968	Vince Dooley (2)	Georgia
1969	Charles McClendon	LSU
1970	Charles Shira	Mississippi State
1970	Charles McClendon (2)	LSU
1971	Bear Bryant (6)	Alabama
1972	Ralph Jordan (4)	Auburn
1973	Bear Bryant (7)	Alabama
1974	Steve Sloan	Vanderbilt
1974	Bear Bryant (8)	Alabama
1975	Ken Cooper	Ole Miss
1976	Vince Dooley (3)	Georgia
1977	Fran Curci	Kentucky
1977	Bear Bryant (9)	Alabama
1978	Vince Dooley (4)	Georgia
1978	Bear Bryant (10)	Alabama
1979	Bear Bryant (11)	Alabama
1980	Charley Pell	Florida
1980	Vince Dooley (5)	Georgia
1981	Bear Bryant (12)	Alabama
1982	George MacIntyre	Vanderbilt
1982	Jerry Stovall	LSU
1983	Billy Brewer	Ole Miss
1983	Pat Dye	Auburn
1983	Jerry Claiborne	Kentucky
1984	Bill Arnsparger	LSU
1984	Galen Hall	Florida (Note: Florida was assessed a postseason ban following an NCAA investigation, and the SEC subsequently vacated any championship. The Sugar Bowl automatic bid for the conference champion was awarded to LSU. Under modern rules, LSU would be credited with the conference championship.)
1985	Johnny Majors	Tennessee
1986	Billy Brewer (2)	Ole Miss
1986	Bill Arnsparger (2)	LSU
1987	Bill Curry	Alabama
1987	Pat Dye (2)	Auburn
1988	Pat Dye (3)	Auburn
1989	Bill Curry (2)	Alabama
1990	Billy Brewer (3)	Ole Miss
1990	Steve Spurrier	Florida
1991	Gerry DiNardo	Vanderbilt
1991	Steve Spurrier (2)	Florida
1992	Gene Stallings	Alabama
1993	Terry Bowden	Auburn
1994	Gene Stallings (2)	Alabama
1994	Steve Spurrier (3)	Florida
1995	Steve Spurrier (4)	Florida
1996	Steve Spurrier (5)	Florida
1997	Jim Donnan	Georgia
1997	Tommy Tuberville	Ole Miss
1998	Phillip Fulmer	Tennessee
1999	Mike DuBose	Alabama
2000	Lou Holtz	South Carolina
2001	Houston Nutt	Arkansas
2002	Mark Richt	Georgia
2003	David Cutcliffe	Ole Miss
2003	Nick Saban	LSU
2004	Tommy Tuberville (2)	Auburn
2005	Steve Spurrier (6)	South Carolina
2005	Mark Richt (2)	Georgia
2006	Houston Nutt (2)	Arkansas
2007	Sylvester Croom	Mississippi State
2008	Nick Saban (2)	Alabama
2008	Bobby Johnson	Vanderbilt
2008	Houston Nutt (3)	Ole Miss
2009	Nick Saban (3)	Alabama
2010	Steve Spurrier (7)	South Carolina
2010	Gene Chizik	Auburn
2011	Les Miles	LSU
2012	Kevin Sumlin	Texas A&M
2012	Will Muschamp	Florida
2013	Gus Malzahn	Auburn
2014	Gary Pinkel	Missouri
2014	Dan Mullen	Mississippi State
2015	Jim McElwain	Florida
2016	Nick Saban (4)	Alabama
2017	Kirby Smart	Georgia
2018	Mark Stoops	Kentucky
2019	Ed Orgeron	LSU
2020	Nick Saban (5)	Alabama
2021	Kirby Smart (2)	Georgia
2022	Josh Heupel	Tennessee
2022	Kirby Smart (3)	Georgia
2023	Eliah Drinkwitz	Missouri
2024	Clark Lea	Vanderbilt
2024	Shane Beamer	South Carolina
2025	Clark Lea (2)	Vanderbilt

Note: If the selector is not shown, they were named winner by all of them.

== Notes and references ==
Notes

General references

- "SEC Player of the Year Winners". Sports Reference.
- "SEC Offensive Player of the Year Winners". Sports Reference.
- "SEC Defensive Player of the Year Winners". Sports Reference.
- "SEC Coach of the Year Winners". Sports Reference.

Footnotes
