= 1935 Southeastern Conference football season =

- Sport: Football
- Duration: September 19, 1935 – January 1, 1936
- Teams: 13
- Champion: LSU

SEC seasons
- 1934 1936

1935 Southeastern Conference football standings
	Conf.					Overall
Team		W		L			W		L
No. 7 LSU $	5	–	0	–	0	9	–	2	–	0
Vanderbilt	5	–	1	–	0	7	–	3	–	0
Ole Miss	3	–	1	–	0	9	–	3	–	0
No. 15 Auburn	5	–	2	–	0	8	–	2	–	0
No. 17 Alabama	4	–	2	–	0	6	–	2	–	1
Tulane	3	–	3	–	0	6	–	4	–	0
Kentucky	3	–	3	–	0	5	–	4	–	0
Georgia Tech	3	–	4	–	0	5	–	5	–	0
Mississippi State	2	–	3	–	0	8	–	3	–	0
Tennessee	2	–	3	–	0	4	–	5	–	0
Georgia	2	–	4	–	0	6	–	4	–	0
Florida	1	–	6	–	0	3	–	7	–	0
Sewanee	0	–	6	–	0	2	–	7	–	0
$ – Conference champion; Rankings from United Press

The 1935 Southeastern Conference football season was the third season of college football played by the member schools of the Southeastern Conference (SEC) and was a part of the 1935 college football season. LSU compiled a 9–2 overall record, with a conference record of 5–0, and were SEC champion.

== Results and team statistics ==
Conf. rank	Team	Head coach	Overall record	Conf. record	UP final	PPG	PAG
1	LSU	Bernie Moore	9–2–0 (.818)	5–0–0 (1.000)	#7	20.3	3.7
2	Vanderbilt	Ray Morrison	7–3–1 (.682)	5–1–0 (.833)	NR	17.9	6.8
3	Ole Miss	Ed Walker	9–3–0 (.750)	3–1–0 (.750)	NR	25.8	7.2
4	Auburn	Jack Meagher	8–2–0 (.800)	5–2–0 (.714)	#15	20.1	4.6
5	Alabama	Frank Thomas	6–2–1 (.722)	4–2–0 (.667)	#17	20.6	6.1
6 (tie)	Tulane	Ted Cox	6–4–0 (.600)	3–3–0 (.500)	NR	15.6	12.3
6 (tie)	Kentucky	Chet A. Wynne	5–4–0 (.556)	3–3–0 (.500)	NR	18.6	10.4
8	Georgia Tech	William Alexander	5–5–0 (.500)	3–4–0 (.429)	NR	16.2	14.2
9 (tie)	Mississippi State	Ralph Sasse	8–3–0 (.727)	2–3–0 (.400)	NR	17.4	7.0
9 (tie)	Tennessee	W. H. Britton	4–5–0 (.444)	2–3–0 (.400)	NR	10.9	17.2
11	Georgia	Harry Mehre	6–4–0 (.600)	2–4–0 (.333)	NR	16.9	8.8
12	Florida	Dennis K. Stanley	3–7–0 (.300)	1–6–0 (.143)	NR	11.3	15.4
13	Sewanee	Harry E. Clark	2–7–0 (.222)	0–6–0 (.000)	NR	1.7	25.3

Key
UP final = Rankings from UP sports writers. See 1935 college football rankings
PPG = Average of points scored per game
PAG = Average of points allowed per game

== Schedule ==
Index to colors and formatting
SEC member won
SEC member lost
SEC member tie
SEC teams in **bold**

=== Week Zero ===
Date	Visiting team	Home team	Site	Result	Attendance	Ref.
September 19	**Ole Miss**	Millsaps	Alumni Field • Jackson, MS	**W** 20–0		
September 21	Union (TN)	**Vanderbilt**	Dudley Field • Nashville, TN	**W** 34–0		
September 21	Maryville (TN)	**Kentucky**	McLean Stadium • Lexington, KY	**W** 60–0		
September 23	**Sewanee**	Saint Louis	Walsh Stadium • St. Louis, MO	**L** 0–32		

=== Week One ===
Date	Visiting team	Home team	Site	Result	Attendance	Ref.
September 27	Birmingham–Southern	**Auburn**	Cramton Bowl • Montgomery, AL	**W** 25–7		
September 27	**Kentucky**	Xavier	Corcoran Field • Cincinnati, OH	**W** 21–7	15,000	
September 28	VMI	**Tulane**	Tulane Stadium • New Orleans, LA	**W** 44–0	15,000	
September 28	Rice	**LSU**	Tiger Stadium • Baton Rouge, LA	**W** 7–10	22,000	
September 28	West Tennessee State Teachers	**Ole Miss**	Hemingway Stadium • Oxford, MS (rivalry)	**W** 92–0		
September 28	Presbyterian	**Georgia Tech**	Grant Field • Atlanta, GA	**W** 33–0	6,000	
September 28	Southwestern (TN)	**Tennessee**	Shields–Watkins Field • Knoxville, TN	**W** 20–0	7,500	
September 28	Mercer	**Georgia**	Sanford Stadium • Athens, GA	**W** 31–0		
September 28	Stetson	**Florida**	Florida Field • Gainesville, FL	**W** 34–0	5,000	
September 28	Howard (AL)	**Alabama**	Denny Stadium • Tuscaloosa, AL	**T** 7–7	8,000	
September 28	**Mississippi State**	**Vanderbilt**	Dudley Field • Nashville, TN	**VAN** 14–9		

=== Week Two ===
Date	Visiting team	Home team	Site	Result	Attendance	Ref.
October 4	Millsaps	**Mississippi State**	Scott Field • Starkville, MS	**W** 45–0		
October 5	Texas	**LSU**	Tiger Stadium • Baton Rouge, LA	**W** 18–6		
October 5	Cumberland (TN)	**Vanderbilt**	Dudley Field • Nashville, TN	**W** 32–7		
October 5	Southwestern (TN)	**Vanderbilt**	Hemingway Stadium • Oxford, MS	**W** 32–0		
October 5	**Alabama**	George Washington	Griffith Stadium • Washington, DC	**W** 39–0	30,000	
October 5	**Georgia**	Chattanooga	Chamberlain Field • Chattanooga, TN	**L** 40–0	2,000	
October 5	**Kentucky**	Ohio State	Ohio Stadium • Columbus, OH	**L** 6–19	56,686	
October 5	North Carolina	**Tennessee**	Shields–Watkins Field • Knoxville, TN	**L** 13–38	15,000	
October 5	**Auburn**	**Tulane**	Tulane Stadium • New Orleans, LA	**AUB** 10–0	18,000	
October 5	**Sewanee**	**Georgia Tech**	Grant Field • Atlanta, GA	**GT** 32–0		

=== Week Three ===
Date	Visiting team	Home team	Site	Result	Attendance	Ref.
October 11	**Vanderbilt**	Temple	Beury Stadium • Philadelphia, PA	**L** 3–6	22,000	
October 11	**Sewanee**	**Ole Miss**	Soldiers' Field • Clarksdale, MS	**OM** 33–0		
October 12	**LSU**	Manhattan	Ebbets Field • Brooklyn, NY	**W** 32–0	20,000	
October 12	Furman	**Georgia**	Sanford Stadium • Athens, GA	**W** 31–7	10,000	
October 12	**Tennessee**	**Auburn**	Legion Field • Birmingham, AL (rivalry)	**TEN** 6–13	15,617	
October 12	**Mississippi State**	**Alabama**	Denny Stadium • Tuscaloosa, AL (rivalry)	**MSS** 20–7	8,000	
October 12	**Florida**	**Tulane**	Tulane Stadium • New Orleans, LA	**TUL** 19–7	10,000	
October 12	**Georgia Tech**	**Kentucky**	McLean Stadium • Lexington, KY	**KY** 25–6		

=== Week Four ===
Date	Visiting team	Home team	Site	Result	Attendance	Ref.
October 18	Loyola (LA)	**Mississippi State**	Loyola Stadium • New Orleans, LA	**W** 6–0		
October 19	Arkansas	**LSU**	State Fair Stadium • Shreveport, LA (rivalry)	**W** 13–7		
October 19	Duke	**Georgia Tech**	Grant Field • Atlanta, GA	**W** 6–0	12,000	
October 19	Tennessee Wesleyan	**Sewanee**	Hardee Field • Sewanee, TN	**W** 9–7		
October 19	**Vanderbilt**	Fordham	Polo Grounds • New York, NY	**W** 7–13	25,000	
October 19	**Georgia**	NC State	Riddick Stadium • Raleigh, NC	**W** 13–0	11,000	
October 19	**Tulane**	Minnesota	Memorial Stadium • Minneapolis, MN	**L** 0–20	38,000	
October 19	**Florida**	**Ole Miss**	Hemingway Stadium • Oxford, MS	**OM** 27–6	7,000	
October 19	**Kentucky**	**Auburn**	Cramton Bowl • Montgomery, AL	**AUB** 23–0	8,000	
October 19	**Alabama**	**Tennessee**	Shields–Watkins Field • Knoxville, TN (rivalry)	**ALA** 25–0	20,000	

=== Week Five ===
Date	Visiting team	Home team	Site	Result	Attendance	Ref.
October 25	**Auburn**	Duke	Duke Stadium • Durham, NC	**W** 7–0	8,000	
October 26	**Mississippi State**	Xavier	Corcoran Field • Cincinnati, OH	**W** 7–0	9,000	
October 26	Centre	**Tennessee**	Shields–Watkins Field • Knoxville, TN	**W** 25–14	5,000	
October 26	**Ole Miss**	Marquette	Marquette Stadium • Milwaukee, WI	**L** 7–33	13,500	
October 26	**Georgia Tech**	North Carolina	Kenan Memorial Stadium • Chapel Hill, NC	**L** 0–19	20,000	
October 26	Maryland	**Florida**	Florida Field • Gainesville, FL	**L** 6–20		
October 26	**LSU**	**Vanderbilt**	Dudley Field • Nashville, TN	**LSU** 7–2		
October 26	**Alabama**	**Georgia**	Sanford Stadium • Athens, GA (rivalry)	**ALA** 17–7	25,000	
October 26	**Sewanee**	**Tulane**	Tulane Stadium • New Orleans, LA	**TUL** 33–0	10,000	

=== Week Six ===
Date	Visiting team	Home team	Site	Result	Attendance	Ref.
November 1	**Ole Miss**	Saint Louis	Walsh Stadium • St. Louis, MO	**W** 21–7	10,000	
November 2	**Mississippi State**	Army	Michie Stadium • West Point, NY	**W** 13–7	20,000	
November 2	Colgate	**Tulane**	Tulane Stadium • New Orleans, LA	**W** 14–6	20,000	
November 2	Tennessee Tech	**Sewanee**	Hardee Field • Sewanee, TN	**W** 6–0		
November 2	**Tennessee**	Duke	Duke Stadium • Durham, NC	**L** 6–19	15,000	
November 2	**Auburn**	**LSU**	Tiger Stadium • Baton Rouge, LA (rivalry)	**LSU** 6–0	15,000	
November 2	**Vanderbilt**	**Georgia Tech**	Grant Field • Atlanta, GA (rivalry)	**VAN** 14–13		
November 2	**Kentucky**	**Alabama**	Legion Field • Birmingham, AL	**ALA** 13–0	14,500	
November 2	**Georgia**	**Florida**	Fairfield Stadium • Jacksonville, FL (rivalry)	**UGA** 7–0	20,000	

=== Week Seven ===
Date	Visiting team	Home team	Site	Result	Attendance	Ref.
November 9	Clemson	Alabama	Denny Stadium • Tuscaloosa, AL (rivalry)	**W** 33–0	8,000	
November 9	**Mississippi State**	LSU	Tiger Stadium • Baton Rouge, LA (rivalry)	**LSU** 28–13		
November 9	**Sewanee**	Vanderbilt	Dudley Field • Nashville, TN (rivalry)	**VAN** 46–0		
November 9	**Tennessee**	Ole Miss	Crump Stadium • Memphis, TN	**TEN** 14–14		
November 9	**Auburn**	Georgia Tech	Grant Field • Atlanta, GA (rivalry)	**AUB** 33–7	20,000	
November 9	**Georgia**	Tulane	Tulane Stadium • New Orleans, LA	**UGA** 26–13	12,000	
November 9	**Florida**	Kentucky	McLean Stadium • Lexington, KY	**KEN** 15–6	8,000	

=== Week Eight ===
Date	Visiting team	Home team	Site	Result	Attendance	Ref.
November 15	**Mississippi State**	Mississippi State Teachers	Faulkner Field • Hattiesburg, MS	**W** 27–0		
November 16	**Ole Miss**	Centre	Cheek Field • Danville, KY	**W** 26–0	3,500	
November 16	Oglethorpe	**Auburn**	Drake Field • Auburn, AL	**W** 51–0	5,000	
November 16	**LSU**	**Georgia**	Sanford Stadium • Athens, GA	**LSU** 13–0		
November 16	**Vanderbilt**	**Tennessee**	Shields–Watkins Field • Knoxville, TN (rivalry)	**VAN** 13–7		
November 16	**Georgia Tech**	**Alabama**	Legion Field • Birmingham, AL (rivalry)	**ALA** 38–7	11,000	
November 16	**Kentucky**	**Tulane**	Tulane Stadium • New Orleans, LA	**TUL** 20–13	8,000	
November 16	**Sewanee**	**Florida**	Florida Field • Gainesville, FL	**FLA** 20–0		

=== Week Nine ===
Date	Visiting team	Home team	Site	Result	Attendance	Ref.
November 23	Southwestern Louisiana	LSU	Tiger Stadium • Baton Rouge, LA	**W** 56–0		
November 23	Centenary	Ole Miss	Municipal Stadium • Jackson, MS	**W** 6–0	4,000	
November 23	Louisiana Normal	Tulane	Tulane Stadium • New Orleans, LA	**W** 13–0	10,000	
November 23	**Auburn**	Georgia	Memorial Stadium • Columbus, GA (rivalry)	**AUB** 19–7	15,000	
November 23	**Florida**	Georgia Tech	Grant Field • Atlanta, GA	**GT** 39–6		
November 23	**Sewanee**	Mississippi State	Scott Field • Starkville, MS	**MSS** 25–0		

=== Week Ten ===
Date	Visiting team	Home team	Site	Result	Attendance	Ref.
November 28	Alabama	Vanderbilt	Dudley Field • Nashville, TN	**VAN** 14–6	18,000	
November 28	Tennessee	Kentucky	McLean Stadium • Lexington, KY	**KEN** 27–0	16,000	
November 30	LSU	Tulane	Tulane Stadium • New Orleans, LA (rivalry)	**LSU** 41–0	34,000	
November 30	Mississippi State	Ole Miss	Hemingway Stadium • Oxford, MS (rivalry)	**OM** 14–6		
November 30	Auburn	Florida	Miami Stadium • Miami, FL (rivalry)	**AUB** 27–6	8,000	
November 30	Georgia	Georgia Tech	Grant Field • Atlanta, GA (rivalry)	**GT** 19–7	32,000	

=== Week Eleven ===
Date	Visiting team	Home team	Site	Result	Attendance	Ref.
December 7	South Carolina	**Florida**	Plant Field • Tampa, FL	**W** 22–0		

=== Postseason ===
Date	Visiting team	Home team	Site	Result	Attendance	Ref.
January 1, 1936	TCU	**LSU**	Tulane Stadium • New Orleans, LA (Sugar Bowl)	**L** 2–3	35,000	
January 1, 1936	Catholic University	**Ole Miss**	Miami Stadium • Miami, FL (Orange Bowl)	**L** 19–20	10,000	

== All-conference players ==
The following players were recognized as consensus first-team honors from the Associated Press (AP) and United Press (UP) on the 1935 All-SEC football team:

- Willie Geny, End, Vanderbilt (AP-1, AU-1)
- Gaynell Tinsley, End, LSU (AP-1, AU-1)
- James Whatley, Tackle, Alabama (AP-1, AU-1)
- Haygood Paterson, Tackle, Auburn (AP-1, AU-1)
- Walter Gilbert, Center, Auburn (AP-1, AU-1)
- Riley Smith, Quarterback, Alabama (AP-1, AU-1)
- Ike Pickle, Halfback, Mississippi State (AP-1, AU-1)
- Jesse Fatherree, Halfback, LSU (AP-1, AU-1)

== All-Americans ==
Two SEC players were consensus first-team picks on the 1935 College Football All-America Team:

- Gaynell Tinsley, End, LSU (AP, COL, INS, LIB, NEA, UP)
- Riley Smith, Quarterback, Alabama (AAB, AP, COL, INS, NEA)

Other SEC players receiving All-American honors from at least one selector were:

- Bear Bryant, End, Alabama (NEA-3)
- Jim Whatley, Tackle, Alabama (NEA-2)
- Haygood Paterson, Tackle, Auburn (AP-3; LIB-2)
- Osborne Helveston, Guard, LSU (CP-1)
- Walter Gilbert, Center, Auburn (UP-2; LIB-3; NYS-1)
- Jesse Fatherree, Halfback, LSU (NEA-3)
- Abe Mickal, Fullback, LSU (LIB-2)

== Head coaches ==
Records through the completion of the 1935 season

Team	Head coach	Years at school	Overall record	Record at school	SEC record
Alabama	Frank Thomas	5	66–15–3 (.804)	40–6–2 (.854)	16–2–1 (.868)
Auburn	Jack Meagher	2	36–36–0 (.500)	10–10–0 (.500)	6–8–0 (.429)
Florida	Dennis K. Stanley	3	14–13–2 (.517)	14–13–2 (.517)	5–11–1 (.324)
Georgia	Harry Mehre	8	48–27–3 (.635)	48–27–3 (.635)	8–7–0 (.533)
Georgia Tech	William Alexander	16	81–60–10 (.570)	81–60–10 (.570)	5–15–0 (.250)
Kentucky	Chet A. Wynne	2	71–50–9 (.581)	10–9–0 (.526)	4–6–0 (.400)
LSU	Bernie Moore	1	21–14–3 (.592)	9–2–0 (.818)	5–0–0 (1.000)
Mississippi State	Ralph Sasse	1	33–8–2 (.791)	8–3–0 (.727)	2–3–0 (.400)
Ole Miss	Ed Walker	6	29–28–5 (.508)	29–28–5 (.508)	7–6–2 (.533)
Sewanee	Harry E. Clark	5	15–30–2 (.340)	15–30–2 (.340)	0–16–0 (.000)
Tennessee	W. H. Britton	1	7–7–1 (.500)	4–5–0 (.444)	2–3–0 (.400)
Tulane	Ted Cox	4	39–11–3 (.764)	28–10–2 (.725)	15–5–1 (.738)
Vanderbilt	Ray Morrison	2	95–49–22 (.639)	11–5–0 (.688)	5–1–0 (.833)

== 1936 NFL draft ==
The following SEC players were selected in the 1936 NFL draft:

Round	Overall Pick	Player name	School	Position	NFL team
1	2	Riley Smith	Alabama	Quarterback	Boston Redskins
4	31	Bear Bryant	Alabama	End	Brooklyn Dodgers
4	36	Gene Rose	Tennessee	End	New York Giants
5	44	Kavanaugh Francis	Alabama	Center	Detroit Lions
6	53	Abe Mickal	LSU	Back	Detroit Lions
