= 1934 All-SEC football team =

Football team

The 1934 All-SEC football team consists of American football players selected to the All-Southeastern Conference (SEC) chosen by various selectors for the 1934 college football season. The Alabama Crimson Tide and Tulane Green Wave shared the conference title. The Crimson Tide defeated the Stanford Indians 29 to 13 in the Rose Bowl, and was selected national champions by Dunkel, Williamson and Football Thesaurus. Alabama halfback Dixie Howell was voted SEC Player of the Year.

== All-SEC selections ==
=== Ends ===
- Don Hutson, Alabama (College Football Hall of Fame) (AP-1, UP-1)
- Bennie Fenton, Auburn (AP-1, UP-1)
- Joe Rupert, Kentucky (AP-3, UP-2)
- Bear Bryant, Alabama (College Football Hall of Fame) (AP-2)
- Gene Rose, Tennessee (AP-2)
- Louis Pounders, Tennessee (UP-2)
- Willie Geny, Vanderbilt (AP-3)

=== Tackles ===
- Justin Rukas, LSU (AP-1, UP-1)
- Bill Lee, Alabama (AP-1, UP-1)
- W. Williams, Georgia Tech (AP-2, UP-2)
- Howard Bailey, Tennessee (AP-2, UP-2)
- William Stark, Florida (AP-3)
- Ranny Throgmorton, Vanderbilt (AP-3)

=== Guards ===
- Charlie Marr, Alabama (AP-1, UP-1)
- Murray Warmath, Tennessee (AP-1, UP-2)
- John Brown, Georgia (AP-2, UP-1)
- Hessier, Tulane (AP-2)
- Ralph Hatley, Tennessee (UP-2)
- Brown, LSU (AP-3)
- Welch, Auburn (AP-3)

=== Centers ===
- Homer Robinson, Tulane (AP-1, UP-1)
- Walter Gilbert, Auburn (College Football Hall of Fame) (AP-3, UP-2)
- McKnight, Georgia (AP-2)

=== Quarterbacks ===
- Charles Vaughan, Tennessee (AP-2, UP-1)
- Rand Dixon, Vanderbilt (AP-2)
- C. H. Roberts, Georgia Tech (UP-2)
- Riley Smith, Alabama (College Football Hall of Fame) (AP-3)

=== Halfbacks ===
- Abe Mickal, LSU (College Football Hall of Fame) (AP-1, UP-1)
- Dixie Howell, Alabama (College Football Hall of Fame) (AP-1, UP-1)
- Bert Johnson, Kentucky (AP-1, UP-2)
- Wally Brown, Florida (AP-2)
- Phil Dickens, Tennessee (UP-2)
- Jesse Fatherree, LSU (AP-3)
- C. H. Roberts, Georgia Tech (AP-3)

=== Fullbacks ===
- Claude Simons, Jr., Tulane (AP-1, UP-1)
- Joe Demyanovich, Alabama (AP-2, UP-2)
- Chapman, Georgia (AP-3)

== Key ==
AP = compiled by the Associated Press from coaches and sportswriters.

UP = United Press

Bold = Consensus first-team selection by both AP and UP

== See also ==
- 1934 College Football All-America Team
