= 1935 Alabama Crimson Tide football team =

American college football season

1935 Alabama Crimson Tide football
- Conference: Southeastern Conference
- Record: 6–2–1 (4–2 SEC)
- Head coach: Frank Thomas (5th season)
- Captain: Jimmy Walker
- Home stadium: Denny Stadium; Legion Field

1935 Southeastern Conference football standings
	Conf.					Overall
Team		W		L			W		L
No. 7 LSU $	5	–	0	–	0	9	–	2	–	0
Vanderbilt	5	–	1	–	0	7	–	3	–	0
Ole Miss	3	–	1	–	0	9	–	3	–	0
No. 15 Auburn	5	–	2	–	0	8	–	2	–	0
No. 17 Alabama	4	–	2	–	0	6	–	2	–	1
Tulane	3	–	3	–	0	6	–	4	–	0
Kentucky	3	–	3	–	0	5	–	4	–	0
Georgia Tech	3	–	4	–	0	5	–	5	–	0
Mississippi State	2	–	3	–	0	8	–	3	–	0
Tennessee	2	–	3	–	0	4	–	5	–	0
Georgia	2	–	4	–	0	6	–	4	–	0
Florida	1	–	6	–	0	3	–	7	–	0
Sewanee	0	–	6	–	0	2	–	7	–	0
$ – Conference champion; Rankings from United Press

The 1935 Alabama Crimson Tide football team (variously "Alabama", "UA" or "Bama") represented the University of Alabama in the 1935 college football season. It was the Crimson Tide's 42nd overall and 3rd season as a member of the Southeastern Conference (SEC). The team was led by head coach Frank Thomas, in his fifth year, and played their home games at Denny Stadium in Tuscaloosa and Legion Field in Birmingham, Alabama. They finished the season with a record of six wins, two losses and one tie (6–2–1 overall, 4–2 in the SEC).

After Alabama opened the season with an "upset" tie against Howard, Alabama shutout George Washington at Griffith Stadium. One week later, the Crimson Tide suffered their first defeat since 1933 against Mississippi State at Denny Stadium which was also both their first SEC and loss at Denny Stadium. Following this defeat, Alabama responded with five consecutive victories over Tennessee, Georgia, Kentucky, Clemson on homecoming and Georgia Tech before they lost to Vanderbilt to close the season.

For his performance during the season, Riley Smith was a consensus selection to the 1935 College Football All-America Team. In February 1936 Smith, Bear Bryant and Kavanaugh Francis became the first Crimson Tide players selected in the NFL draft.

== Schedule ==
Date	Time	Opponent	Site	Result	Attendance	Source
September 28		Howard (AL)*	Denny Stadium; Tuscaloosa, AL	T 7–7	4,500–8,000	
October 5	1:30 p.m.	at George Washington*	Griffith Stadium; Washington, DC	W 39–0	30,000	
October 12		Mississippi State	Denny Stadium; Tuscaloosa, AL (rivalry)	L 7–20	8,000	
October 19		at Tennessee	Shields-Watkins Field; Knoxville, TN (rivalry)	W 25–0	20,000	
October 26		at Georgia	Sanford Stadium; Athens, GA (rivalry)	W 17–7	25,000	
November 2		Kentucky	Legion Field; Birmingham, AL	W 13–0	14,500	
November 9		Clemson*^{†}	Denny Stadium; Tuscaloosa, AL (rivalry)	W 33–0	8,000	
November 16		Georgia Tech	Legion Field; Birmingham, AL (rivalry)	W 38–7	11,000	
November 28		at Vanderbilt	Dudley Field; Nashville, TN	L 6–14	18,000	
*Non-conference game; ^{†}Homecoming; All times are in Central time

== Game summaries ==
=== Howard (AL) ===
Team	1	2	3	4	Total
Howard	0	0	0	7	7
Alabama	0	7	0	0	7

- Date: September 28
- Location: Denny Stadium
  Tuscaloosa, AL
- Game attendance: 4,500–8,000

To open the 1935 season Alabama was almost upset by Howard College (now Samford University), but escaped with a 7–7 tie at Denny Stadium. After a scoreless first, Alabama took a 7–0 halftime lead after James Angelich scored on an eight-yard touchdown run. The Bulldogs' defense continued to hold Alabama's offense in check for the remainder of the game, and in the fourth quarter, Howard tied the game. The touchdown was made on a 32-yard Ewing Harbin pass to Dan Snell late in the game. The tie marked the first time Alabama had not won since their loss at Fordham in 1933 and their first in an opening game since their loss at Vanderbilt to open the 1903 season.

=== George Washington ===
Team	1	2	3	4	Total
• Alabama	13	6	6	14	39
George Washington	0	0	0	0	0

- Date: October 5
- Location: Griffith Stadium
  Washington, DC
- Game attendance: 30,000

In what was the first road game of the season, Alabama shutout the George Washington Colonials 39–0 at Griffith Stadium. Riley Smith scored the first Crimson Tide touchdown in the first quarter on a four-yard run to cap a 92-yard drive. Joe Riley scored later in the quarter on a 70-yard punt return to give Alabama a 13–0 lead at the end of the first. In the second, the Crimson Tide scored on a four-yard reverse by James Nesbet for a 19–0 halftime lead. After Nesbet scored a touchdown on a five-yard run in the third, Alabama closed the game with a pair of Clarence Rohrdanz touchdown runs in the fourth quarter for the 39–0 victory.

=== Mississippi State ===
Team	1	2	3	4	Total
• Mississippi State	13	7	0	0	20
Alabama	0	0	7	0	7

- Date: October 12
- Location: Denny Stadium
  Tuscaloosa, AL
- Game attendance: 8,000

Against their long-time rival, the Mississippi State Maroons, Alabama lost 20–7 at Denny Stadium. The loss was Alabama's first defeat against State since 1914, their first all-time SEC loss and their first all-time loss at Denny Stadium. The Maroons took a 13–0 lead in the first quarter after a pair of Charles Armstrong touchdown passes, first to Ike Pickle and then to Robert Thames. They then extended their lead to 20–0 by halftime after two-yard Pickle touchdown run in the second. In the third, Alabama scored their only touchdown after James Whatley blocked a Pickle punt that was returned twelve-yards by James Walker.

=== Tennessee ===
Third Saturday in October

Team	1	2	3	4	Total
• Alabama	6	6	6	7	25
Tennessee	0	0	0	0	0

- Date: October 19
- Location: Shields-Watkins Field
  Knoxville, TN
- Game attendance: 20,000

Against rival Tennessee, Alabama defeated the Volunteers, 25–0 at Shields-Watkins Field and scored one touchdown in each of the four quarters in their victory. Riley Smith scored in the first on a four-yard run and in the second on a Joe Riley run for a 12–0 halftime lead. Both Riley and Smoth scored touchdowns in the third and fourth quarters respectively for the 25–0 victory. The game was also notable for the performance of Bear Bryant at end, as he competed in the game in spite of having a fractured fibula in his right leg, incurred the week before against Mississippi State.

=== Georgia ===
Team	1	2	3	4	Total
• Alabama	0	7	0	10	17
Georgia	7	0	0	0	7

- Date: October 26
- Location: Sanford Stadium
  Athens, GA
- Game attendance: 25,000

Against Georgia, Alabama defeated the Bulldogs 17–7 before a homecoming crowd of 25,000 at Sanford Stadium. The Bulldogs took a 7–0 first quarter lead after John Bond threw a 43-yard touchdown pass to Al Minot. Alabama responded in the second with a two-yard Young Boozer touchdown run to make the halftime score 7–7. After a scoreless third, in the fourth the Crimson Tide took a 10–7 lead on a 14-yard Riley Smith field goal. Smith then scored the final points of the game later in the quarter with his one-yard touchdown run.

=== Kentucky ===
Team	1	2	3	4	Total
Kentucky	0	0	0	0	0
• Alabama	7	0	6	0	13

- Date: November 2
- Location: Legion Field
  Birmingham, AL
- Game attendance: 14,500

In their first game at Legion Field of the season, Alabama defeated the Kentucky Wildcats 13–0 in Birmingham. James Nesbet scored in the first on a four-yard run and Joe Kilgrow threw a 21-yard touchdown pass to James Walker in the third for the 13–0 victory.

=== Clemson ===
Team	1	2	3	4	Total
Clemson	0	0	0	0	0
• Alabama	0	13	13	7	33

- Date: November 9
- Location: Denny Stadium
  Tuscaloosa, AL
- Game attendance: 8,000

On homecoming at Denny Stadium, Alabama defeated the Clemson Tigers of the Southern Conference 33–0 in Tuscaloosa. After a scoreless first, the Crimson Tide scored a pair of touchdowns in the second. The first was on a Riley Smith quarterback sneak and the second on a seven-yard James Walker run. Alabama extended their lead further to 26–0 by the end of the third period with touchdowns scored by James Walker on a one-yard run and by James Angelich on a short run. They then closed the game with their fifth touchdown of the afternoon on a 30-yard Red Keller touchdown reception.

=== Georgia Tech ===
Team	1	2	3	4	Total
Georgia Tech	0	7	0	0	7
• Alabama	6	13	6	13	38

- Date: November 16
- Location: Legion Field
  Birmingham, AL
- Game attendance: 11,000

Against the Georgia Tech, Alabama defeated the Yellow Jackets 38–7 at Legion Field. Alabama took a 6–0 first quarter lead after James Angelich scored on a touchdown run. In the second quarter, both teams traded touchdowns on a Riley Smith quarterback sneak and a Clarence Rohrdanz run for Alabama and on a 37-yard E. H. Gibson reception and lateral pass to E. R. Collins. Up 19–7 at the half, Alabama closed the game with 19 unanswered second half points. Bear Bryant scored on a run in the third and on a pair of Joe Kilgrow touchdown runs in the fourth.

=== Vanderbilt ===
Team	1	2	3	4	Total
Alabama	0	0	6	0	6
• Vanderbilt	0	7	0	7	14

- Date: November 28
- Location: Dudley Field
  Nashville, TN

In the season finale on Thanksgiving Day, Alabama lost to the Vanderbilt Commodores for the first time since 1929 with their 14–6 defeat at Dudley Field. After a scoreless first, Vanderbilt took a 7–0 halftime lead after Paul Dixon scored on a three-yard touchdown run. Alabama responded in the third with a 51-yard Riley Smith touchdown pass to James Walker, however a failed extra point kept the Commodores in the lead 7–6. Byron Beard scored the final points of the game after he recovered a fumbled punt by Joe Riley in the endzone for a touchdown.

== After the season ==
=== Awards ===
After the season, Riley Smith was selected by consensus to the 1935 College Football All-America Team as a quarterback.

=== NFL draft ===
Several players that were varsity lettermen from the 1935 squad were drafted into the National Football League (NFL) between the 1936 and 1938 drafts. These players included the following:

Year	Round	Overall	Player name	Position	NFL team
1936	1	2	Riley Smith	Blocking back	Boston Redskins
1936	4	31	Bear Bryant	End	Brooklyn Dodgers
1936	5	44	Kavanaugh Francis	Center	Detroit Lions
1937	2	14	Arthur White	Back	New York Giants
1938	2	13	Joe Kilgrow	Back	Brooklyn Dodgers

== Personnel ==
=== Varsity letter winners ===
Player	Hometown	Position
George Adams	Montgomery, Alabama	End
James Angelich	Indiana Harbor, Indiana	Halfback
Ben Baswell	Pell City, Alabama	Tackle
Young Boozer	Dothan, Alabama	Halfback
Bear Bryant	Moro Bottom, Arkansas	End
Tilden "Happy" Campbell	Pine Bluff, Arkansas	Quarterback
Kavanaugh Francis	Timson, Texas	Center
Ralph Gandy	Birmingham, Alabama	End
Joe Kilgrow	Montgomery, Alabama	Halfback
Samuel Hamilton Lyon	Meridian, Mississippi	Tackle
T. A. "Son" McGahey	Columbus, Mississippi	Tackle
Ben McLeod	Leeksville, Mississippi	Halfback
Lamar Moyle	Decatur, Alabama	Center
James Nisbet	Bainbridge, Georgia	Fullback
James Radford	Hartford, Alabama	Tackle
Joe Riley	Dothan, Alabama	Halfback
Clarence Rohrdanz	Harvey, Indiana	Fullback
Joe Shepherd	Tuscaloosa, Alabama	Guard
Riley Smith	Columbus, Mississippi	Quarterback
Charlie Stapp	Birmingham, Alabama	Halfback
James Jimmy	Holt, Alabama	End
Jim Whatley	Alexander City, Alabama	Tackle
Arthur "Tarzan" White	Atmore, Alabama	Guard
Temple Williamson	Tuscaloosa, Alabama	Quarterback

=== Coaching staff ===
Name	Position	Seasons at Alabama	Alma mater
Frank Thomas	Head coach	5	Notre Dame (1923)
Paul Burnum	Assistant coach	6	Alabama (1922)
Hank Crisp	Assistant coach	15	VPI (1920)
Jim Dildy	Assistant coach	1	Alabama (1934)
Harold Drew	Assistant coach	5	Bates (1916)
Larry Hughes	Assistant coach	1	Alabama (1934)
Joe F. Sharpe	Assistant coach	1	Alabama (1932)
