= 1935 All-SEC football team =

American college football all-star team

The 1935 All-SEC football team consists of American football players selected to the All-Southeastern Conference (SEC) chosen by various selectors for the 1935 college football season. The LSU Tigers won the conference, posting an undefeated conference record.

== All-SEC selections ==
=== Ends ===
- Willie Geny, Vanderbilt (AP-1, AU-1)
- Gaynell Tinsley, LSU (College Football Hall of Fame) (AP-1, AU-1)
- Gene Rose, Tennessee (AP-2, AU-1)
- Chuck Gelatka, Miss. St. (AP-2, AU-1)
- Bear Bryant, Alabama (College Football Hall of Fame) (AP-3)
- Warren Barrett, LSU (AP-3)

=== Tackles ===
- Jim Whatley, Alabama (AP-1, AU-1)
- Haygood Paterson, Auburn (AP-1, AU-1)
- Justin Rukas, LSU (AP-2, AU-2)
- Sterling Richardson, Ole Miss (AP-2)
- Lefty Eubanks, Georgia Tech (AU-2)
- Stanley Nevers, Kentucky (AP-3)
- Ranny Throgmorton, Vanderbilt (AP-3)

=== Guards ===
- Frank Johnson, Georgia (AP-1)
- Middleton Fitzsimmons, Georgia Tech (AP-1)
- Frank Gantt, Auburn (AP-2, AU-1)
- Osborn Helveston, LSU (AU-1)
- Art White, Alabama (AP-3, AU-2)
- Samuel Brown, Vanderbilt (AP-2)
- Leroy Moorehead, Georgia (AU-2)
- William Stone, Miss. St. (AP-3)

=== Centers ===
- Walter Gilbert, Auburn (College Football Hall of Fame) (AP-1, AU-1)
- Kavanaugh Francis, Alabama (AP-2, AU-2)
- Marvin Stewart, LSU (AP-3)

=== Quarterbacks ===
- Riley Smith, Alabama (College Football Hall of Fame) (AP-1, AU-1)
- Rand Dixon, Vanderbilt (AP-2, AU-2)
- Barney Mintz, Tulane (AP-3)

=== Halfbacks ===
- Ike Pickle, Miss. St. (AP-1, AU-1)
- Jesse Fatherree, LSU (AP-1, AU-1)
- Ray Hapes, Ole Miss (AP-3, AU-1 [as fb])
- Robert Davis, Kentucky (AP-2, AU-2)
- Rad Rodgers, Ole Miss (AP-2)
- John Bond, Georgia (AU-2)
- Billy Chase, Florida (AP-3)

=== Fullbacks ===
- Bill Crass, LSU (AP-1, AU-2)
- Abe Mickal, LSU (College Football Hall of Fame) (AP-2)
- Dutch Konemann, Georgia Tech (AP-3)

== Key ==
AP = compiled by the Associated Press from coaches and sportswriters.

AU = selected by The Plainsmen, Auburn's semi weekly paper.

== See also ==
- 1935 College Football All-America Team
