= 1935 Sewanee Tigers football team =

American college football season

1935 Sewanee Tigers football
- Conference: Southeastern Conference
- Record: 2–7 (0–6 SEC)
- Head coach: Harry E. Clark (5th season)
- Home stadium: Hardee Field

1935 Southeastern Conference football standings
	Conf.					Overall
Team		W		L			W		L
No. 7 LSU $	5	–	0	–	0	9	–	2	–	0
Vanderbilt	5	–	1	–	0	7	–	3	–	0
Ole Miss	3	–	1	–	0	9	–	3	–	0
No. 15 Auburn	5	–	2	–	0	8	–	2	–	0
No. 17 Alabama	4	–	2	–	0	6	–	2	–	1
Tulane	3	–	3	–	0	6	–	4	–	0
Kentucky	3	–	3	–	0	5	–	4	–	0
Georgia Tech	3	–	4	–	0	5	–	5	–	0
Mississippi State	2	–	3	–	0	8	–	3	–	0
Tennessee	2	–	3	–	0	4	–	5	–	0
Georgia	2	–	4	–	0	6	–	4	–	0
Florida	1	–	6	–	0	3	–	7	–	0
Sewanee	0	–	6	–	0	2	–	7	–	0
$ – Conference champion; Rankings from United Press

The 1935 Sewanee Tigers football team was an American football team that represented Sewanee: The University of the South as a member of the Southeastern Conference during the 1935 college football season. In their fifth season under head coach Harry E. Clark, Sewanee compiled a 2–7 record.

== Schedule ==
Date	Opponent	Site	Result	Attendance	Source
September 23	at Saint Louis*	Walsh Stadium; St. Louis, MO	L 0–32	3,500	
October 5	at Georgia Tech	Grant Field; Atlanta, GA	L 0–32		
October 11	at Ole Miss	Soldiers' Field; Clarksdale, MS	L 0–33		
October 19	Tennessee Wesleyan*	Hardee Field; Sewanee, TN	W 9–7		
October 26	at Tulane	Tulane Stadium; New Orleans, LA	L 0–33	10,000	
November 2	Tennessee Tech*	Hardee Field; Sewanee, TN	W 6–0		
November 9	at Vanderbilt	Dudley Field; Nashville, TN (rivalry)	L 0–46		
November 16	at Florida	Florida Field; Gainesville, FL	L 0–20		
November 23	at Mississippi State	Scott Field; Starkville, MS	L 0–25		
*Non-conference game
