= 1935 Florida Gators football team =

American college football season

1935 Florida Gators football
- Conference: Southeastern Conference
- Record: 3–7 (1–6 SEC)
- Head coach: Dennis K. Stanley (3rd season)
- Captain: Billy Chase
- Home stadium: Florida Field

Uniform
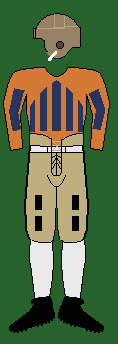

1935 Southeastern Conference football standings
	Conf.					Overall
Team		W		L			W		L
No. 7 LSU $	5	–	0	–	0	9	–	2	–	0
Vanderbilt	5	–	1	–	0	7	–	3	–	0
Ole Miss	3	–	1	–	0	9	–	3	–	0
No. 15 Auburn	5	–	2	–	0	8	–	2	–	0
No. 17 Alabama	4	–	2	–	0	6	–	2	–	1
Tulane	3	–	3	–	0	6	–	4	–	0
Kentucky	3	–	3	–	0	5	–	4	–	0
Georgia Tech	3	–	4	–	0	5	–	5	–	0
Mississippi State	2	–	3	–	0	8	–	3	–	0
Tennessee	2	–	3	–	0	4	–	5	–	0
Georgia	2	–	4	–	0	6	–	4	–	0
Florida	1	–	6	–	0	3	–	7	–	0
Sewanee	0	–	6	–	0	2	–	7	–	0
$ – Conference champion; Rankings from United Press

The 1935 Florida Gators football team represented the University of Florida during the 1935 college football season. The season marked Dennis K. Stanley's third and final year as the head coach of the Florida Gators football team. The highlights of the season included the Gators' victories over Sewanee (20–0) and South Carolina (22–0). Stanley's 1935 Florida Gators finished with an overall record of 3–7 and a Southeastern Conference (SEC) tally of 1–6, placing twelfth of thirteen SEC members.

== Schedule ==
Date	Opponent	Site	Result	Attendance	Source
September 28	Stetson*	Florida Field; Gainesville, FL	W 34–0	5,000	
October 12	at Tulane	Tulane Stadium; New Orleans, LA	L 7–19		
October 19	at Ole Miss	Hemingway Stadium; Oxford, MS	L 6–27	7,000	
October 26	Maryland*^{†}	Florida Field; Gainesville, FL	L 6–20		
November 2	vs. Georgia	Fairfield Stadium; Jacksonville, FL (rivalry)	L 0–7	20,000	
November 9	at Kentucky	McLean Stadium; Lexington, KY (rivalry)	L 6–15	8,000	
November 16	Sewanee	Florida Field; Gainesville, FL	W 20–0		
November 25	at Georgia Tech	Grant Field; Atlanta, GA	L 6–39		
November 30	vs. Auburn	Miami Stadium; Miami, FL (rivalry)	L 6–27	8,000	
December 7	vs. South Carolina*	Plant Field; Tampa, FL	W 22–0		
*Non-conference game; ^{†}Homecoming

== Postseason ==
Stanley submitted his resignation at the end of the season in the face of alumni discontent, but, in an unusual move, remained a member of the coaching staff when the new head coach, Josh Cody, took over in 1936. Stanley, who was also an education professor, later became the first dean of the university's new College of Health and Human Performance in 1946.
