= Bert Johnson (American football) =

American football player (1912–1993)

No. 4, 3, 21, 44
- Position: Running back

Personal information
- Born: February 18, 1912; Ashland, Kentucky, U.S.
- Died: August 10, 1993 (aged 81); Lexington, Kentucky, U.S.
- Listed height: 6 ft 0 in (1.83 m)
- Listed weight: 212 lb (96 kg)

Career information
- High school: Ashland
- College: Kentucky (1933-1936)
- NFL draft: 1937: 5th round, 42nd overall pick

Career history
- Brooklyn Dodgers (1937); Chicago Bears (1938–1939); Chicago Cardinals (1939–1941); Philadelphia Eagles (1942)

Awards and highlights
- First-team All-SEC (1934)

Career NFL statistics
- Rushing yards: 368
- Rushing average: 2.4
- Receptions: 17
- Receiving yards: 270
- Total touchdowns: 5
- Stats at Pro Football Reference

Albert Edward Johnson (February 18, 1912 – August 10, 1993) was a professional American football running back for seven seasons in the National Football League (NFL). He was selected in the fifth round of the 1937 NFL draft with the 42nd overall pick.
