= Justin Rukas =

American football player (1910–1963)

Profile
- Positions: Guard, tackle

Personal information
- Born: February 24, 1910; Gary, Indiana
- Died: September 28, 1963 (aged 53); New Orleans, Louisiana
- Listed height: 6 ft 0 in (1.83 m)
- Listed weight: 205 lb (93 kg)

Career information
- College: LSU

Career history
- Brooklyn Dodgers (1936)

Awards and highlights
- First-team All-SEC (1934); Second-team All-SEC (1935)

Justin Rukas (February 4, 1910 – September 28, 1963) was an American football player. He was a prominent tackle and guard for the LSU Tigers football team. He graduated with a degree in geology. Rukas played professionally for the Brooklyn Dodgers of the National Football League (NFL) for one season.
