= 1935 Kentucky Wildcats football team =

American college football season

1935 Kentucky Wildcats football
- Conference: Southeastern Conference
- Record: 5–4 (3–3 SEC)
- Head coach: Chet A. Wynne (2nd season)
- Captain: Jim Long
- Home stadium: McLean Stadium

1935 Southeastern Conference football standings
	Conf.					Overall
Team		W		L			W		L
No. 7 LSU $	5	–	0	–	0	9	–	2	–	0
Vanderbilt	5	–	1	–	0	7	–	3	–	0
Ole Miss	3	–	1	–	0	9	–	3	–	0
No. 15 Auburn	5	–	2	–	0	8	–	2	–	0
No. 17 Alabama	4	–	2	–	0	6	–	2	–	1
Tulane	3	–	3	–	0	6	–	4	–	0
Kentucky	3	–	3	–	0	5	–	4	–	0
Georgia Tech	3	–	4	–	0	5	–	5	–	0
Mississippi State	2	–	3	–	0	8	–	3	–	0
Tennessee	2	–	3	–	0	4	–	5	–	0
Georgia	2	–	4	–	0	6	–	4	–	0
Florida	1	–	6	–	0	3	–	7	–	0
Sewanee	0	–	6	–	0	2	–	7	–	0
$ – Conference champion; Rankings from United Press

The 1935 Kentucky Wildcats football team was an American football team that represented the University of Kentucky as a member of the Southeastern Conference (SEC) during the 1935 college football season. In their second season under head coach Chet A. Wynne, the Wildcats compiled an overall record of 5–4 with a mark of 3–3 against conference opponents, tied for sixth place in the SEC, and outscored opponents by a total of 167 to 94. The team played its home games at McLean Stadium in Lexington, Kentucky.

== Schedule ==
Date	Opponent	Site	Result	Attendance	Source
September 21	Maryville*	McLean Stadium; Lexington, KY	W 60–0		
September 27	at Xavier*	Corcoran Field; Cincinnati, OH	W 21–7	15,000	
October 5	at Ohio State*	Ohio Stadium; Columbus, OH	L 6–19	56,686	
October 12	Georgia Tech	McLean Stadium; Lexington, KY	W 25–6		
October 19	at Auburn	Cramton Bowl; Montgomery, AL	L 0–23	8,000	
November 2	at Alabama	Legion Field; Birmingham, AL	L 0–13	14,500	
November 9	Florida	McLean Stadium; Lexington, KY (rivalry)	W 15–6	8,000	
November 16	at Tulane	Tulane Stadium; New Orleans, LA	L 13–20	8,000	
November 28	Tennessee	McLean Stadium; Lexington, KY (rivalry)	W 27–0	16,000	
*Non-conference game
