= 1935 Ole Miss Rebels football team =

American college football season

1935 Ole Miss Rebels football

Orange Bowl, L 19–20 vs. Catholic University
- Conference: Southeastern Conference
- Record: 9–3 (3–1 SEC)
- Head coach: Ed Walker (6th season)
- Home stadium: Hemingway Stadium

1935 Southeastern Conference football standings
	Conf.					Overall
Team		W		L			W		L
No. 7 LSU $	5	–	0	–	0	9	–	2	–	0
Vanderbilt	5	–	1	–	0	7	–	3	–	0
Ole Miss	3	–	1	–	0	9	–	3	–	0
No. 15 Auburn	5	–	2	–	0	8	–	2	–	0
No. 17 Alabama	4	–	2	–	0	6	–	2	–	1
Tulane	3	–	3	–	0	6	–	4	–	0
Kentucky	3	–	3	–	0	5	–	4	–	0
Georgia Tech	3	–	4	–	0	5	–	5	–	0
Mississippi State	2	–	3	–	0	8	–	3	–	0
Tennessee	2	–	3	–	0	4	–	5	–	0
Georgia	2	–	4	–	0	6	–	4	–	0
Florida	1	–	6	–	0	3	–	7	–	0
Sewanee	0	–	6	–	0	2	–	7	–	0
$ – Conference champion; Rankings from United Press

The 1935 Ole Miss Rebels football team was an American football team that represented the University of Mississippi in the Southeastern Conference during the 1935 college football season. In its sixth season under head coach Ed Walker, the team compiled a 9–3 record (3–1 against conference opponents) and was defeated by the Catholic University in the 1936 Orange Bowl. The team played its home games at Vaught–Hemingway Stadium in Oxford, Mississippi.

== Schedule ==
Date	Time	Opponent	Site	Result	Attendance	Source
September 19		at Millsaps*	Alumni Field; Jackson, MS	W 20–0		
September 28		West Tennessee State Teachers*	Hemingway Stadium; Oxford, MS (rivalry)	W 92–0		
October 5		Southwestern (TN)*	Hemingway Stadium; Oxford, MS	W 32–0		
October 11		Sewanee	Soldiers' Field; Clarksdale, MS	W 33–0		
October 19		Florida	Hemingway Stadium; Oxford, MS	W 27–6	7,000	
October 26		at Marquette*	Marquette Stadium; Milwaukee, WI	L 7–33	13,500	
November 1		at Saint Louis*	Walsh Stadium; St. Louis, MO	W 21–7	10,000	
November 9		vs. Tennessee	Crump Stadium; Memphis, TN (rivalry)	L 13–14		
November 16	2:00 p.m.	at Centre*	Farris Stadium; Danville, KY	W 26–0	3,500	
November 23		Centenary*	Municipal Stadium; Jackson, MS	W 6–0	4,000	
November 30		Mississippi State	Hemingway Stadium; Oxford, MS (Egg Bowl)	W 14–6		
January 1, 1936		vs. Catholic University*	Miami Stadium; Miami, FL (Orange Bowl)	L 19–20	10,000	
*Non-conference game; All times are in Central time

== Roster ==
- E Buster Poole, Jr.
