= 1935 Mississippi State Maroons football team =

American college football season

1935 Mississippi State Maroons football
- Conference: Southeastern Conference
- Record: 8–3 (2–3 SEC)
- Head coach: Ralph Sasse (1st season)
- Home stadium: Scott Field

1935 Southeastern Conference football standings
| | Conf. | | | | | Overall |
| Team | | W | | L | | | W | | L |
|---|---|---|---|---|---|---|---|---|---|---|
| No. 7 LSU $ | 5 | – | 0 | – | 0 | 9 | – | 2 | – | 0 |
| Vanderbilt | 5 | – | 1 | – | 0 | 7 | – | 3 | – | 0 |
| Ole Miss | 3 | – | 1 | – | 0 | 9 | – | 3 | – | 0 |
| No. 15 Auburn | 5 | – | 2 | – | 0 | 8 | – | 2 | – | 0 |
| No. 17 Alabama | 4 | – | 2 | – | 0 | 6 | – | 2 | – | 1 |
| Tulane | 3 | – | 3 | – | 0 | 6 | – | 4 | – | 0 |
| Kentucky | 3 | – | 3 | – | 0 | 5 | – | 4 | – | 0 |
| Georgia Tech | 3 | – | 4 | – | 0 | 5 | – | 5 | – | 0 |
| Mississippi State | 2 | – | 3 | – | 0 | 8 | – | 3 | – | 0 |
| Tennessee | 2 | – | 3 | – | 0 | 4 | – | 5 | – | 0 |
| Georgia | 2 | – | 4 | – | 0 | 6 | – | 4 | – | 0 |
| Florida | 1 | – | 6 | – | 0 | 3 | – | 7 | – | 0 |
| Sewanee | 0 | – | 6 | – | 0 | 2 | – | 7 | – | 0 |
$ – Conference champion; Rankings from United Press

The 1935 Mississippi State Maroons football team was an American football team that represented Mississippi State College (now known as Mississippi State University) as a member of the Southeastern Conference (SEC) during the 1935 college football season. In their first year under head coach Ralph Sasse, the Maroons compiled an overall record of 8–3, with a conference record of 2–3, and finished tied for ninth in the SEC.

It was the first year as head coach for Ralph Sasse, who had previously coached at Army. Sasse led the Maroons to a 13–7 upset win over Army, a game which has been called one of the greatest wins in school history.

== Schedule ==
| Date | Opponent | Site | Result | Attendance | Source |
|---|---|---|---|---|---|
| September 20 | Howard (AL)* | Scott Field; Starkville, MS | W 19–6 | 5,000 | |
| September 28 | at Vanderbilt | Dudley Field; Nashville, TN | L 9–14 | | |
| October 4 | Millsaps* | Scott Field; Starkville, MS | W 45–0 | | |
| October 12 | at Alabama | Denny Stadium; Tuscaloosa, AL (rivalry) | W 20–7 | 8,000 | |
| October 18 | at Loyola (LA)* | Loyola Stadium; New Orleans, LA | W 6–0 | | |
| October 26 | at Xavier* | Corcoran Field; Cincinnati, OH | W 7–0 | 9,000 | |
| November 2 | at Army* | Michie Stadium; West Point, NY | W 13–7 | 20,000 | |
| November 9 | at LSU | Tiger Stadium; Baton Rouge, LA (rivalry) | L 13–28 | | |
| November 15 | at Mississippi State Teachers* | Faulkner Field; Hattiesburg, MS | W 27–0 | | |
| November 23 | Sewanee | Scott Field; Starkville, MS | W 25–0 | | |
| November 30 | at Ole Miss | Hemingway Stadium; Oxford, MS (Egg Bowl) | L 6–14 | | |
*Non-conference game
