= Abe Mickal =

American football player (1912–2001)

No. 84 – LSU Tigers
- Positions: Halfback, fullback

Personal information
- Born: June 15, 1913; Talia, Lebanon
- Died: September 20, 2001 (aged 88); New Orleans, Louisiana, U.S.
- Listed height: 5 ft 10 in (1.78 m)
- Listed weight: 180 lb (82 kg)

Career information
- High school: McComb (McComb, Mississippi)
- College: LSU (1933–1935)

Awards and highlights
- Second-team All-American (1935); First-team All-SEC (1934); 2× Second-team All-SEC (1933, 1935); Louisiana Sports Hall of Fame; Mississippi Sports Hall of Fame

Ibrahim Khalil "Abe" Mickal (June 15, 1913 – September 20, 2001) was a Lebanese-American college football player and a doctor. He played as a halfback for the LSU Tigers football team of Louisiana State University, where he was notable for his passing skills and play-making ability, which earned him the nickname "Miracle Mickal". He was also the team's primary punter and placekicker. A three-time All-Southeastern Conference (SEC) selection, Mickal led LSU to an undefeated season in 1933 and a conference championship and Sugar Bowl in 1935. In 1936, Mickal played quarterback for a college all-star team that was the first team of college players to defeat a professional team. Although selected in the 1936 NFL draft, he did not play professionally. Mickal was a charter member of the LSU Athletic Hall of Fame in 1937 and was inducted into the College Football Hall of Fame in 1967.

In addition to football, Mickal was a cadet in LSU's Reserve Officers' Training Corps (ROTC), was a member of the pre-med club and debate team, and as a senior was president of the university's student body. While a student, he was offered a seat in the Louisiana State Senate by U.S. Senator and noted LSU supporter Huey Long, which he declined. He earned his medical degree in 1940, and after serving in World War II began a lifelong career in obstetrics and gynecology. He served as head professor of the LSU Medical School OB/GYN department for over twenty years. Actively involved in various university affairs during and after his time as a student, Mickal was honored as LSU's "Alumnus of the Year" in 1980.

== Early life and education ==
Mickal was born in the Levant in an area that is today part of Lebanon. He immigrated with his family to the United States in 1920, where they arrived on Ellis Island. He settled in McComb, Mississippi and attended McComb High School, where he played football, baseball, and basketball and ran track. His father Kalil, who ran a local general store, was initially against his son playing sports. "It was an old Lebanese custom," Mickal later explained, "that the eldest son take over the business. My father wasn't aware that I was playing." His father was eventually persuaded by the townspeople to let his son play. During his senior year, he was recruited by LSU and Notre Dame to play football, and ultimately chose the Tigers after the death of Notre Dame head coach Knute Rockne.

== College ==
Mickal was an all-around player, a triple threat who played both running back and defense. He was regarded as an excellent deep-ball passer; in the words of LSU coach Lawrence "Biff" Jones: "Mickal is a greater passer than Red Cagle—he's the greatest I ever saw." Jones was Cagle's coach while at Army. One sportswriter referred to Mickal as "the Dizzy Dean of the nation's forward passers." He was also known for his play-making ability during crucial moments of games, and LSU compiled a win–loss record of 23–4–5 in the three seasons Mickal played for the team.

=== 1933 ===
Mickal showed his versatility in the first game of the 1933 season against Rice, tossing a 40-yard pass on the first play from scrimmage to end Pete Burge and booting punts of 76 and 61 yards. In week four against Arkansas Mickal completed touchdown passes of 48 and 57 yards and ran for a 15-yard touchdown, as he was responsible for every score in the 20–0 win over the eventual Southwest Conference champion Razorbacks. He scored the only touchdown of LSU's final game of the season, against Tennessee, with a goal line dive into the end zone. He also kicked the extra point for the 7–0 victory, and completed the season having successfully made every extra point he attempted. The Tigers finished undefeated with three ties in their first season as members of the Southeastern Conference (SEC). After the season, Mickal was named to the United Press (UP) All-SEC second team as a halfback.

=== 1934 ===
One of Mickal's most notable games came in 1934 against the Mustangs of Southern Methodist. He threw two touchdown passes, the first one a 32-yarder to tie the game at 7–7 in the second quarter. Late in the fourth quarter and down by a touchdown, Mickal dropped back at his own 35-yard line and hurled a pass down the middle of the field. It was caught in stride at the Mustang 20-yard line by Gaynell Tinsley, who ran it into the end zone to tie the game at 14–14, which was the final score. In week four against 13th-ranked Arkansas, Mickal completed five of seven passes for 117 yards, which included a 52-yard bomb in the third quarter for the first score of the 16–0 win. He also averaged over 50 yards per punt on nine punts. The next week he threw a touchdown pass, kicked a field goal, and averaged over 40 yards per punt in a 29–0 win over previously undefeated Vanderbilt. Mickal was named a first-team All-SEC selection as a fullback by the Associated Press (AP) and as a halfback by the UP.

==== Senatorship offer ====
During the season, Mickal was acclaimed an honorary Louisiana State Senator by U.S. Senator Huey P. Long, whom he had befriended, at a burlesque campus meeting. Long was a noted LSU supporter and was highly involved in operations of the football program. When it came time for his ceremonial "seating" Mickal refused to appear for the ceremony, despite the urging of Long. After Long reasoned with the senate and spectators that Mickal "had to study," Mickal was granted a five-day leave of absence by senator Harvey Peltier to "do his work at school and go forward with his preparation for his football duties." Mickal remained silent on the matter, however; he did not give a reason for his refusal of the honor. The day he was to be inducted, Mickal said in a telegram to Long that if he accepted the senatorship he would introduce a joint resolution that made it "unlawful" for any Tulane player to cross the LSU goal line in 1934.

=== 1935 ===
Mickal had a slow start to 1935 while he recovered from a broken ankle he suffered over the summer. In week three, he threw two touchdown passes against Manhattan College, and a game-winning touchdown pass against Vanderbilt two weeks later. In the regular season finale, Mickal was responsible for three touchdowns in a 41–0 win over rival Tulane. LSU faced the TCU Horned Frogs at the end of the season in the Sugar Bowl, in a game that was a highly anticipated match-up between Mickal and the Horned Frogs' Sammy Baugh. The offenses were unable to do much, however, as rain throughout the day had muddied the field. TCU won the game, 3–2. LSU finished the season undefeated in conference play for its first SEC championship. Mickal was named to the AP All-SEC second-team as a fullback after the season, and earned second-team All-America honors from Liberty magazine.

=== 1936 All-Stars vs. Bears ===
In September 1936, Mickal played quarterback for the Centennial College All-Stars, a team composed of college players from southern schools to play against the National Football League's Chicago Bears at Cotton Bowl stadium. He scored the All-Stars' only touchdown with a dive into the end zone from the one-foot line in the third quarter. The Bears scored their only touchdown later that quarter on a 5-yard run by Bronko Nagurski. Mickal had a chance to tackle Nagurski before the goal line. "A lot of things flashed through my mind," explained Mickal. "There was nothing between him and the goal line but me. I thought about making the perfect tackle and reading about being the All-Stars' hero. Then I thought about Nagurski's size. I thought about the Nagurski legend. I thought about going to med school. I thought about possible brain damage." He decided to step aside and let Nagurski score. The extra point, however, was blocked by Bob Reynolds, and the game ended 7–6 in favor of the All-Stars. It was the first time a team of college players defeated a professional American football team.

=== Extracurricular ===
Mickal was actively involved in the university's Reserve Officers' Training Corps. He received the Outstanding Cadet Award as a freshman and was regimental sergeant major as a junior. As a senior, he attained the rank of Cadet Colonel and earned the Kemper Williams Sabre as the school's outstanding cadet. Additionally, he was a member of the pre-med club and debate team, and in 1936 was president of the school's Interfraternity Council, college of arts and sciences, and student body. Mickal was a member of the Theta Kappa Nu fraternity.

== Medical career ==
Mickal was the first player from LSU to ever be drafted into the NFL, selected in the sixth round of the 1936 NFL draft by the Detroit Lions. However, he did not play in the NFL. He instead chose to complete his medical degree at the Louisiana State University School of Medicine, where he graduated from in 1940. He served as a major in the U.S. Army Medical Corps during World War II. After the war, he worked in obstetrics and gynecology at New Orleans Charity Hospital from 1946 to 1949, shortly after which he was hired to the LSU medical faculty. In 1959, he became the head professor of the LSU Medical School, a position he served in until his retirement in 1980. He was a founding member of the Society of Gynecologic Oncology and the Infectious Disease Society for Obstetrics and Gynecology, and served as president of the Society of Gynecologic Surgeons from 1981 to 1982. From 1985 until his death in 2001 he was vice president for medical affairs at Kenner Regional Medical Center.

== Honors ==
Mickal was a charter member of the LSU Athletic Hall of Fame in 1937. In 1967, the National Football Foundation named Mickal to the College Football Hall of Fame. He was inducted into the Louisiana Sports Hall of Fame in 1969 and the Mississippi Sports Hall of Fame in 1985. Mickal was named LSU's "Alumnus of the Year" in 1980 and its "Medical Alumnus of the Year" in 1985. "It's been a beautiful marriage—and I've had all the better of it," said Mickal of his involvement with the university. The American College of Obstetricians and Gynecologists gave Mickal its Distinguished Service Award in 1991.
