= 1935 Tennessee Volunteers football team =

American college football season

1935 Tennessee Volunteers football
- Conference: Southeastern Conference
- Record: 4–5 (2–3 SEC)
- Head coach: W. H. Britton (1st season)
- Home stadium: Shields–Watkins Field

1935 Southeastern Conference football standings
	Conf.					Overall
Team		W		L			W		L
No. 7 LSU $	5	–	0	–	0	9	–	2	–	0
Vanderbilt	5	–	1	–	0	7	–	3	–	0
Ole Miss	3	–	1	–	0	9	–	3	–	0
No. 15 Auburn	5	–	2	–	0	8	–	2	–	0
No. 17 Alabama	4	–	2	–	0	6	–	2	–	1
Tulane	3	–	3	–	0	6	–	4	–	0
Kentucky	3	–	3	–	0	5	–	4	–	0
Georgia Tech	3	–	4	–	0	5	–	5	–	0
Mississippi State	2	–	3	–	0	8	–	3	–	0
Tennessee	2	–	3	–	0	4	–	5	–	0
Georgia	2	–	4	–	0	6	–	4	–	0
Florida	1	–	6	–	0	3	–	7	–	0
Sewanee	0	–	6	–	0	2	–	7	–	0
$ – Conference champion; Rankings from United Press

The 1935 Tennessee Volunteers (variously Tennessee, UT, or the Vols) represented the University of Tennessee in the 1935 college football season. Playing as a member of the Southeastern Conference (SEC), the team was led by head coach W. H. Britton, in his first and only year as head coach, and played their home games at Shields–Watkins Field in Knoxville, Tennessee. They finished the season with a record of four wins and five losses (4–5 overall, 2–3 in the SEC). Britton was appointed head coach after Robert Neyland was called up to active military duty.

== Schedule ==
Date	Time	Opponent	Site	Result	Attendance	Source
September 28		Southwestern (TN)*	Shields–Watkins Field; Knoxville, TN	W 20–0	7,500	
October 5		North Carolina*	Shields–Watkins Field; Knoxville, TN	L 13–38	15,000	
October 12		at Auburn	Legion Field; Birmingham, AL (rivalry)	W 13–6	15,617	
October 19		Alabama^{†}	Shields–Watkins Field; Knoxville, TN (rivalry)	L 0–25	20,000	
October 26	2:00 p.m.	Centre*	Shields–Watkins Field; Knoxville, TN	W 25–14	5,000–6,000	
November 2		at Duke*	Duke Stadium; Durham, NC	L 6–19	15,000	
November 9		vs. Ole Miss	Crump Stadium; Memphis, TN (rivalry)	W 14–13	12,000	
November 16		Vanderbilt	Shields–Watkins Field; Knoxville, TN (rivalry)	L 7–13		
November 28		at Kentucky	McLean Stadium; Lexington, KY (rivalry)	L 0–27	16,000	
*Non-conference game; ^{†}Homecoming; All times are in Central time

== Team players drafted into the NFL ==
Player	Position	Round	Pick	NFL club
Gene Rose	End	4	36	New York Giants
