= Wally Brown (American football) =

American football player

Florida Gators
- Position: Quarterback

Personal information
- Listed weight: 165 lb (75 kg)

Career information
- College: Florida (1934)

Awards and highlights
- Second-team All-SEC (1934)

Wallace Brown was a college football player for coach Dutch Stanley's Florida Gators in 1933 and 1934. He was second-team All-SEC in 1934.
