= Bill Crass =

American football player (1911–1996)

Profile
- Position: Fullback

Personal information
- Born: June 9, 1911; Childress, Texas
- Died: May 25, 1996 (aged 84); Pasadena, California
- Listed height: 6 ft 0 in (1.83 m)
- Listed weight: 205 lb (93 kg)

Career information
- High school: Electra (TX)
- College: LSU

Career history
- Chicago Cardinals (1937)

Awards and highlights
- First-team All-SEC (1935); Second-team All-SEC (1936)
- Stats at Pro Football Reference

Willian Arthur Crass (June 9, 1911 – May 25, 1996) was an American football player who played as a fullback in the National Football League (NFL) for the Chicago Cardinals for one season, in 1937. He appeared in three games for the Cardinals and had five rushing attempts for eight yards in his career. He played college football at Louisiana State University for the LSU Tigers. At LSU, he was a first-team All-Southeastern Conference selection by the Associated Press in 1935 and a second-team selection by United Press International in 1936.
