= 1935 Georgia Tech Yellow Jackets football team =

American college football season

1935 Georgia Tech Yellow Jackets football
- Conference: Southeastern Conference
- Record: 5–5 (3–4 SEC)
- Head coach: William Alexander (16th season)
- Offensive scheme: Single-wing
- Captain: R. W. Eubanks
- Home stadium: Grant Field

1935 Southeastern Conference football standings
	Conf.					Overall
Team		W		L			W		L
No. 7 LSU $	5	–	0	–	0	9	–	2	–	0
Vanderbilt	5	–	1	–	0	7	–	3	–	0
Ole Miss	3	–	1	–	0	9	–	3	–	0
No. 15 Auburn	5	–	2	–	0	8	–	2	–	0
No. 17 Alabama	4	–	2	–	0	6	–	2	–	1
Tulane	3	–	3	–	0	6	–	4	–	0
Kentucky	3	–	3	–	0	5	–	4	–	0
Georgia Tech	3	–	4	–	0	5	–	5	–	0
Mississippi State	2	–	3	–	0	8	–	3	–	0
Tennessee	2	–	3	–	0	4	–	5	–	0
Georgia	2	–	4	–	0	6	–	4	–	0
Florida	1	–	6	–	0	3	–	7	–	0
Sewanee	0	–	6	–	0	2	–	7	–	0
$ – Conference champion; Rankings from United Press

The 1935 Georgia Tech Yellow Jackets football team was an American football team that represented Georgia Tech as a member of the Southeastern Conference (SEC) during the 1935 college football season. In their 16th year under head coach William Alexander, the Yellow Jackets compiled an overall record of 5–5, with a conference record of 3–4, and finished eighth in the SEC.

== Schedule ==
Date	Opponent	Site	Result	Attendance	Source
September 28	Presbyterian*	Grant Field; Atlanta, GA	W 33–0	6,000	
October 5	Sewanee	Grant Field; Atlanta, GA	W 32–0		
October 12	at Kentucky	McLean Stadium; Lexington, KY	L 6–25		
October 19	Duke*	Grant Field; Atlanta, GA	W 6–0	12,000	
October 26	at North Carolina*	Kenan Memorial Stadium; Chapel Hill, NC	L 0–19	20,000	
November 2	Vanderbilt	Grant Field; Atlanta, GA (rivalry)	L 13–14		
November 9	Auburn	Grant Field; Atlanta, GA (rivalry)	L 7–33	20,000	
November 16	at Alabama	Legion Field; Birmingham, AL (rivalry)	L 7–38	11,000	
November 23	Florida	Grant Field; Atlanta, GA	W 39–6		
November 30	Georgia	Grant Field; Atlanta, GA (rivalry)	W 19–7	32,000	
*Non-conference game
