= 1936 All-SEC football team =

American college football all-star team

The 1936 All-SEC football team consists of American football players selected to the All-Southeastern Conference (SEC) chosen by various selectors for the 1936 college football season. LSU won the conference for the second straight year.

== All-SEC selections ==
=== Ends ===
- Gaynell Tinsley, LSU (College Football Hall of Fame) (AP-1, UP-1)
- Joel Eaves, Auburn (AP-1, UP-2)
- Dick Plasman, Vanderbilt (AP-3, UP-1)
- Perron Shoemaker, Alabama (AP-2, UP-2)
- Otis Maffett, Georgia (AP-2)
- Chuck Gelatka, Miss. St. (AP-3)

=== Tackles ===
- Frank Kinard, Ole Miss (College Football Hall of Fame) (AP-1, UP-1)
- Rupert Colmore, Sewanee (AP-1, UP-2)
- Bill Moss, Tulane (AP-2, UP-1)
- Paul Carroll, LSU (AP-3, UP-2)
- Stanley Nevers, Kentucky (AP-2)
- Lott, Miss. St. (AP-3)

=== Guards ===
- Art White, Alabama (AP-1, UP-1)
- Frank Gantt, Auburn (AP-3, UP-1)
- Wardell Leisk, LSU (AP-1)
- Middleton Fitzsimmons, Georgia Tech (AP-2, UP-2)
- DeWitt Weaver, Tennessee (AP-2, UP-2)
- Elijah Tinsley, Georgia (AP-3)

=== Centers ===
- Walter Gilbert, Auburn (College Football Hall of Fame) (AP-1, UP-1)
- Marvin Stewart, LSU (AP-2, UP-2)
- Carl Hinkle, Vanderbilt (College Football Hall of Fame) (AP-3)

=== Quarterbacks ===
- Joe Riley, Alabama (AP-1, UP-1)
- Walter Mayberry, Florida (AP-2)
- Bill May, LSU (AP-3)

=== Halfbacks ===
- Phil Dickens, Tennessee (AP-1, UP-1)
- Howard Bryan, Tulane (AP-1, UP-1)
- Bill Crass, LSU (AP-3, UP-2)
- Robert Davis, Kentucky (AP-3, UP-2)
- Joe Kilgrow, Alabama (AP-2)
- Ray Hapes, Ole Miss (AP-2)

=== Fullbacks ===
- Marlon "Dutch" Konemann, Georgia Tech (AP-1, UP-1)
- Pat Coffee, LSU (AP-2, UP-2)
- Wilton Kilgore, Auburn (AP-3, UP-2)

== Key ==
AP = Associated Press.

UP = United Press.

Bold = Consensus first-team selection by both AP and UP

== See also ==
- 1936 College Football All-America Team
