= 1935 Georgia Bulldogs football team =

American college football season

1935 Georgia Bulldogs football
- Conference: Southeastern Conference
- Record: 6–4 (2–4 SEC)
- Head coach: Harry Mehre (8th season)
- Home stadium: Sanford Stadium

1935 Southeastern Conference football standings
	Conf.					Overall
Team		W		L			W		L
No. 7 LSU $	5	–	0	–	0	9	–	2	–	0
Vanderbilt	5	–	1	–	0	7	–	3	–	0
Ole Miss	3	–	1	–	0	9	–	3	–	0
No. 15 Auburn	5	–	2	–	0	8	–	2	–	0
No. 17 Alabama	4	–	2	–	0	6	–	2	–	1
Tulane	3	–	3	–	0	6	–	4	–	0
Kentucky	3	–	3	–	0	5	–	4	–	0
Georgia Tech	3	–	4	–	0	5	–	5	–	0
Mississippi State	2	–	3	–	0	8	–	3	–	0
Tennessee	2	–	3	–	0	4	–	5	–	0
Georgia	2	–	4	–	0	6	–	4	–	0
Florida	1	–	6	–	0	3	–	7	–	0
Sewanee	0	–	6	–	0	2	–	7	–	0
$ – Conference champion; Rankings from United Press

The 1935 Georgia Bulldogs football team was an American football team that represented the University of Georgia as a member of the Southeastern Conference (SEC) during the 1935 college football season. In their eighth year under head coach Harry Mehre, the Bulldogs compiled an overall record of 6–4, with a conference record of 2–4, and finished 11th in the SEC.

== Schedule ==
Date	Opponent	Site	Result	Attendance	Source
September 28	Mercer*	Sanford Stadium; Athens, GA	W 31–0		
October 5	at Chattanooga*	Chamberlain Field; Chattanooga, TN	W 40–0	2,000	
October 12	Furman*^{†}	Sanford Stadium; Athens, GA	W 31–7	10,000	
October 19	at NC State*	Riddick Stadium; Raleigh, NC	W 13–0	11,000	
October 26	Alabama	Sanford Stadium; Athens, GA (rivalry)	L 7–17	25,000	
November 2	vs. Florida	Fairfield Stadium; Jacksonville, FL (rivalry)	W 7–0	20,000	
November 9	at Tulane	Tulane Stadium; New Orleans, LA	W 26–13	12,000	
November 16	LSU	Sanford Stadium; Athens, GA	L 0–13		
November 23	vs. Auburn	Memorial Stadium; Columbus, GA (rivalry)	L 7–19	15,000	
November 30	at Georgia Tech	Grant Field; Atlanta, GA (rivalry)	L 7–19	32,000	
*Non-conference game; ^{†}Homecoming
