= 2008 Southeastern Conference football season =

- League: NCAA Division I Football Bowl Subdivision
- Sport: Football
- Duration: September 4, 2008–January 8, 2009
- Teams: 12
- TV partner(s): CBS, CBSSN, ESPN, ESPN2, ESPN3, ESPNU, ABC, Raycom

2009 NFL Draft
- Top draft pick: Matthew Stafford (Georgia)
- Picked by: Detroit Lions, 1st overall

Regular season
- East Division champions: Florida
- East Division runners-up: Georgia
- West Division champions: Alabama
- West Division runners-up: Ole Miss

Championship Game
- Champions: Florida
- Runners-up: Alabama

Football seasons
- 2007 2009

The 2008 Southeastern Conference football season was the 76th season of Southeastern Conference (SEC) football, taking place during the 2008 NCAA Division I FBS football season. The season began on September 13, 2008 and ended with the 2008 SEC Championship Game on December 6, 2008.

2008 Southeastern Conference football standings
| | Conf. | | | Overall |
| Team | W | | L | W | | L |
|---|---|---|---|---|---|---|
Eastern Division
| No. 1 Florida x$# | 7 | – | 1 | 13 | – | 1 |
| No. 13 Georgia | 6 | – | 2 | 10 | – | 3 |
| Vanderbilt | 4 | – | 4 | 7 | – | 6 |
| South Carolina | 4 | – | 4 | 7 | – | 6 |
| Tennessee | 3 | – | 5 | 5 | – | 7 |
| Kentucky | 2 | – | 6 | 7 | – | 6 |
Western Division
| No. 6 Alabama x% | 8 | – | 0 | 12 | – | 2 |
| No. 14 Ole Miss | 5 | – | 3 | 9 | – | 4 |
| LSU | 3 | – | 5 | 8 | – | 5 |
| Arkansas | 2 | – | 6 | 5 | – | 7 |
| Auburn | 2 | – | 6 | 5 | – | 7 |
| Mississippi State | 2 | – | 6 | 4 | – | 8 |
Championship: Florida 31, Alabama 20
# – BCS National Champion; $ – BCS representative as conference champion; % – BCS at-large representative; x – Division champion/co-champions; Rankings from AP Poll

== Rankings ==
| | | (Pre) | Sept. 3 | Sept. 10 | Sept. 17 | Sept. 24 | Oct. 1 | Oct. 8 | Oct. 15 | Oct. 22 | Oct. 29 | Nov. 5 | Nov. 12 | Nov. 19 | Nov. 26 | Dec. 3 | Final |
|---|---|---|---|---|---|---|---|---|---|---|---|---|---|---|---|---|---|
| Alabama | AP | 24 | | | | | | | | | | | | | | | |
| Alabama | C | | | | | | | | | | | | | | | | |
| Alabama | BCS | Not released | | | | | | | | | | | | | | | |
| Arkansas | AP | | | | | | | | | | | | | | | | |
| Arkansas | C | | | | | | | | | | | | | | | | |
| Arkansas | BCS | Not released | | | | | | | | | | | | | | | |
| Auburn | AP | 10 | | | | | | | | | | | | | | | |
| Auburn | C | 11 | | | | | | | | | | | | | | | |
| Auburn | BCS | Not released | | | | | | | | | | | | | | | |
| Florida | AP | 5 | | | | | | | | | | | | | | | |
| Florida | C | 5 | | | | | | | | | | | | | | | |
| Florida | BCS | Not released | | | | | | | | | | | | | | | |
| Georgia | AP | 1 | | | | | | | | | | | | | | | |
| Georgia | C | 1 | | | | | | | | | | | | | | | |
| Georgia | BCS | Not released | | | | | | | | | | | | | | | |
| Kentucky | AP | | | | | | | | | | | | | | | | |
| Kentucky | C | | | | | | | | | | | | | | | | |
| Kentucky | BCS | Not released | | | | | | | | | | | | | | | |
| LSU | AP | 7 | | | | | | | | | | | | | | | |
| LSU | C | 6 | | | | | | | | | | | | | | | |
| LSU | BCS | Not released | | | | | | | | | | | | | | | |
| Mississippi State | AP | | | | | | | | | | | | | | | | |
| Mississippi State | C | | | | | | | | | | | | | | | | |
| Mississippi State | BCS | Not released | | | | | | | | | | | | | | | |
| Ole Miss | AP | | | | | | | | | | | | | | | | |
| Ole Miss | C | | | | | | | | | | | | | | | | |
| Ole Miss | BCS | Not released | | | | | | | | | | | | | | | |
| South Carolina | AP | | | | | | | | | | | | | | | | |
| South Carolina | C | | | | | | | | | | | | | | | | |
| South Carolina | BCS | Not released | | | | | | | | | | | | | | | |
| Tennessee | AP | 18 | | | | | | | | | | | | | | | |
| Tennessee | C | 18 | | | | | | | | | | | | | | | |
| Tennessee | BCS | Not released | | | | | | | | | | | | | | | |
| Vanderbilt | AP | | | | | | | | | | | | | | | | |
| Vanderbilt | C | | | | | | | | | | | | | | | | |
| Vanderbilt | BCS | Not released | | | | | | | | | | | | | | | |

== Head coaches ==
| School | Coach | Year |
| Alabama | Nick Saban | 2nd |
| Arkansas | Bobby Petrino | 1st |
| Auburn | Tommy Tuberville | 10th |
| Florida | Urban Meyer | 4th |
| Georgia | Mark Richt | 8th |
| Kentucky | Rich Brooks | 6th |
| LSU | Les Miles | 4th |
| Mississippi State | Sylvester Croom | 5th |
| Ole Miss | Houston Nutt | 1st |
| South Carolina | Steve Spurrier | 4th |
| Tennessee | Phillip Fulmer | 16th |
| Vanderbilt | Bobby Johnson | 7th |

== Championship Game ==
| Date | Time | Visiting team | Home team | Site | TV | Result | Attendance | Ref. |
|---|---|---|---|---|---|---|---|---|
| December 6 | 4:00 p.m. | No. 1 Alabama | No. 2 Florida | Georgia Dome • Atlanta, GA | CBS | FLA 31–20 | 75,892 | |
^{#}Rankings from AP Poll. All times are in Central Time.

== Bowl games ==
SEC Bowl Games
| Game | Date | Location/Time* | Television | Winner^{+} | Score | Loser^{+} | Score | Attendance | Payout |
|---|---|---|---|---|---|---|---|---|---|
| Gaylord Hotels Music City Bowl | December 31, 2008 | LP Field; Nashville, Tennessee; 2:30 p.m. | ESPN | Vanderbilt | 16 | Boston College | 14 | 54,250 | $1,700,000 |
| Chick-fil-A Bowl | December 31, 2008 | Georgia Dome; Atlanta, Georgia; 6:30 p.m. | ESPN | LSU | 38 | Georgia Tech (#14) | 3 | 71,423 | $3,000,000 |
| Outback Bowl | January 1, 2009 | Raymond James Stadium; Tampa, Florida; 10:00 a.m. | ESPN | Iowa | 31 | South Carolina | 10 | 55,117 | $3,200,000 |
| Capital One Bowl | January 1, 2009 | Citrus Bowl; Orlando, Florida; 12:00 p.m. | ABC | Georgia (#16) | 24 | Michigan State (#19) | 12 | 59,681 | $4,250,000 |
| AT&T Cotton Bowl Classic | January 2, 2009 | Cotton Bowl; Dallas, Texas; 1:00 p.m. | FOX | Ole Miss (#20) | 47 | Texas Tech (#8) | 34 | 88,175 | $3,000,000 |
| Autozone Liberty Bowl | January 2, 2009 | Liberty Bowl; Memphis, Tennessee; 4:00 p.m. | ESPN | Kentucky | 25 | East Carolina | 19 | 56,125 | $1,800,000 |
| Allstate Sugar Bowl | January 2, 2009 | Louisiana Superdome; New Orleans, Louisiana; 7:00 p.m. | FOX | Utah (#7) | 31 | Alabama (#4) | 17 | 71,872 | $17,500,000 |
| FedEx BCS National Championship Game | January 8, 2009 | Dolphin Stadium; Miami, Florida; 7:00 p.m. | FOX | Florida (#1) | 24 | Oklahoma (#2) | 14 | 78,468 | $17,500,000 |

Rankings are from AP Poll. All times Central Time Zone.
