= 1935 Tulane Green Wave football team =

American college football season

1935 Tulane Green Wave football
- Conference: Southeastern Conference
- Record: 6–4 (3–3 SEC)
- Head coach: Ted Cox (4th season)
- Captain: Barney Mintz
- Home stadium: Tulane Stadium

1935 Southeastern Conference football standings
	Conf.					Overall
Team		W		L			W		L
No. 7 LSU $	5	–	0	–	0	9	–	2	–	0
Vanderbilt	5	–	1	–	0	7	–	3	–	0
Ole Miss	3	–	1	–	0	9	–	3	–	0
No. 15 Auburn	5	–	2	–	0	8	–	2	–	0
No. 17 Alabama	4	–	2	–	0	6	–	2	–	1
Tulane	3	–	3	–	0	6	–	4	–	0
Kentucky	3	–	3	–	0	5	–	4	–	0
Georgia Tech	3	–	4	–	0	5	–	5	–	0
Mississippi State	2	–	3	–	0	8	–	3	–	0
Tennessee	2	–	3	–	0	4	–	5	–	0
Georgia	2	–	4	–	0	6	–	4	–	0
Florida	1	–	6	–	0	3	–	7	–	0
Sewanee	0	–	6	–	0	2	–	7	–	0
$ – Conference champion; Rankings from United Press

The 1935 Tulane Green Wave football team was an American football team that represented Tulane University as a member of the Southeastern Conference (SEC) during the 1935 college football season. In its fourth and final year under head coach Ted Cox, the Green Wave compiled a 6–4 record (3–3 in conference games), tied for sixth in the SEC, and outscored opponents by a total of 156 to 123.

Tulane played its home games at Tulane Stadium in New Orleans.

== Schedule ==
Date	Opponent	Site	Result	Attendance	Source
September 28	VMI*	Tulane Stadium; New Orleans, LA	W 44–0	15,000	
October 5	Auburn	Tulane Stadium; New Orleans, LA (rivalry)	L 0–10	18,000	
October 12	Florida	Tulane Stadium; New Orleans, LA	W 19–7	10,000	
October 19	at Minnesota*	Memorial Stadium; Minneapolis, MN	L 0–20	38,000	
October 26	Sewanee	Tulane Stadium; New Orleans, LA	W 33–0	10,000	
November 2	Colgate*	Tulane Stadium; New Orleans, LA	W 14–6	20,000	
November 9	Georgia	Tulane Stadium; New Orleans, LA	L 13–26	12,000	
November 16	Kentucky	Tulane Stadium; New Orleans, LA	W 20–13	8,000	
November 23	Louisiana Normal*	Tulane Stadium; New Orleans, LA	W 13–0	10,000	
November 30	LSU	Tulane Stadium; New Orleans, LA (Battle for the Rag)	L 0–41	34,000	
*Non-conference game
