= Chet A. Wynne =

American football player, coach, and administrator (1898–1967)

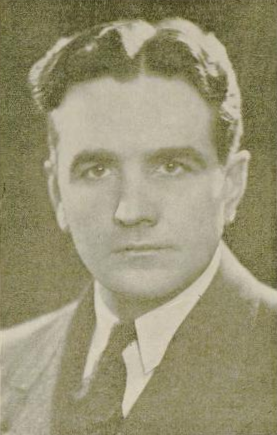
- Wynne, c. 1934

Biographical details
- Born: November 23, 1898; Long Island, Kansas, U.S.
- Died: July 17, 1967 (aged 68); Oak Park, Illinois, U.S.

Playing career
- 1919–1921: Notre Dame
- 1922: Rochester Jeffersons
- Position: Fullback

Coaching career (HC unless noted)
- 1922: Midland
- 1923–1929: Creighton
- 1930–1933: Auburn
- 1934–1937: Kentucky

Administrative career (AD unless noted)
- 1930–1933: Auburn
- 1933–1938: Kentucky

Head coaching record
- Overall: 81–60–9

Accomplishments and honors

Championships
- 1 NIC (1922); 2 NCC (1925, 1927); 1 SoCon (1932)

Chester Allen Wynne (November 23, 1898 – July 17, 1967) was an American football player, coach, and college athletics administrator. He served as the head coach at Midland College–now known as Midland University–in Fremont, Nebraska (1922), Creighton University (1923–1929), Auburn University (1930–1933), and the University of Kentucky (1934–1937), compiling a career college football record of 81–60–9. Wynne was born in Long Island, Kansas. He played fullback at the University of Notre Dame from 1919 to 1921 and professionally for the Rochester Jeffersons of the National Football League (NFL) in 1922. Wynne was also an All-American hurdler for the Notre Dame Fighting Irish track and field team, finishing 5th in the 220 yards hurdles at the inaugural 1921 NCAA Track and Field Championships.

At Auburn, Wynne tallied a 22–15–2 record, including a 9–0–1 mark in 1932, when his team won the Southern Conference title. He then coached at the Kentucky where he compiled a 20–19 record At Kentucky, he also served as athletic director from 1933 to 1938. Wynne died on July 17, 1967, at West Suburban Hospital in Oak Park, Illinois.

== Head coaching record ==
Year	Team	Overall	Conference	Standing	Bowl/playoffs
Midland Warriors (Nebraska Intercollegiate Conference) (1922)
1922	Midland	7–1–1	7–0–1	1st	
Creighton:		7–1–1	7–0–1		
Creighton Blue and White / Bluejays (North Central Conference) (1923–1927)
1923	Creighton	5–5	1–2	T–5th	
1924	Creighton	6–1–2	3–1	3rd	
1925	Creighton	6–3–1	3–0–1	T–1st	
1926	Creighton	4–4–1	2–1–1	4th	
1927	Creighton	6–1–1	2–0	T–1st	
Creighton Bluejays (Missouri Valley Conference) (1928–1929)
1928	Creighton	3–5–1	2–1	2nd	
1929	Creighton	2–6	0–3	5th	
Creighton:		32–25–6	13–8–2		
Auburn Tigers (Southern Conference) (1930–1932)
1930	Auburn	3–7	1–6	21st	
1931	Auburn	5–3–1	3–3	T–8th	
1932	Auburn	9–0–1	6–0–1	T–1st	
Auburn Tigers (Southeastern Conference) (1933)
1933	Auburn	5–5	2–2	T–6th	
Auburn:		22–15–2	12–11–1		
Kentucky Wildcats (Southeastern Conference) (1934–1937)
1934	Kentucky	5–5	1–3	9th	
1935	Kentucky	5–4	3–3	T–6th	
1936	Kentucky	6–4	1–3	10th	
1937	Kentucky	4–6	0–5	12th	
Kentucky:		20–19	5–14		
Total:		71–60–9			
National championship Conference title Conference division title or championship game berth
