= 1935 Auburn Tigers football team =

American college football season

1935 Auburn Tigers football
- Conference: Southeastern Conference
- Record: 8–2 (5–2 SEC)
- Head coach: Jack Meagher (2nd season)
- Captain: Millard Morris
- Home stadium: Drake Field; Legion Field; Cramton Bowl

1935 Southeastern Conference football standings
	Conf.					Overall
Team		W		L			W		L
No. 7 LSU $	5	–	0	–	0	9	–	2	–	0
Vanderbilt	5	–	1	–	0	7	–	3	–	0
Ole Miss	3	–	1	–	0	9	–	3	–	0
No. 15 Auburn	5	–	2	–	0	8	–	2	–	0
No. 17 Alabama	4	–	2	–	0	6	–	2	–	1
Tulane	3	–	3	–	0	6	–	4	–	0
Kentucky	3	–	3	–	0	5	–	4	–	0
Georgia Tech	3	–	4	–	0	5	–	5	–	0
Mississippi State	2	–	3	–	0	8	–	3	–	0
Tennessee	2	–	3	–	0	4	–	5	–	0
Georgia	2	–	4	–	0	6	–	4	–	0
Florida	1	–	6	–	0	3	–	7	–	0
Sewanee	0	–	6	–	0	2	–	7	–	0
$ – Conference champion; Rankings from United Press

The 1935 Auburn Tigers football team was an American football team that represented Auburn University as a member of the Southeastern Conference (SEC) during the 1935 college football season. In their second year under head coach Jack Meagher, the Tigers compiled an overall record of 8–2, with a conference record of 5–2, and finished fourth in the SEC. Millard Morris was the team captain.

== Schedule ==
Date	Opponent	Site	Result	Attendance	Source
September 27	Birmingham–Southern*	Cramton Bowl; Montgomery, AL	W 25–7		
October 5	at Tulane	Tulane Stadium; New Orleans, LA (rivalry)	W 10–0	18,000	
October 12	Tennessee	Legion Field; Birmingham, AL (rivalry)	L 6–13	15,617	
October 19	Kentucky	Cramton Bowl; Montgomery, AL	W 23–0	8,000	
October 25	at Duke*	Duke Stadium; Durham, NC	W 7–0	8,000	
November 2	at LSU	Tiger Stadium; Baton Rouge, LA (rivalry)	L 0–6	15,000	
November 9	at Georgia Tech	Grant Field; Atlanta, GA (rivalry)	W 33–7	20,000	
November 16	Oglethorpe*^{†}	Drake Field; Auburn, AL	W 51–0	5,000	
November 23	vs. Georgia	Memorial Stadium; Columbus, GA (rivalry)	W 19–7	15,000	
November 30	at Florida	Miami Stadium; Miami, FL (rivalry)	W 27–6	8,000	
*Non-conference game; ^{†}Homecoming
