= Bill May (American football, born 1913) =

American football player (1913–2004)

Profile
- Position: Blocking back

Personal information
- Born: February 4, 1913
- Died: November 9, 2004 (aged 91)
- Listed height: 5 ft 11 in (1.80 m)
- Listed weight: 188 lb (85 kg)

Career information
- High school: El Dorado (AR)
- College: LSU

Career history
- Chicago Cardinals (1937–1938)

Awards and highlights
- Third-team All-SEC (1936); Jacobs Blocking Trophy (1936)
- Stats at Pro Football Reference

William L. May (February 4, 1913 – November 9, 2004) was an American football player who played two seasons in the National Football League (NFL) for the Chicago Cardinals as a quarterback and fullback. He played college football at Louisiana State University for the LSU Tigers.
