= Walter Gilbert (American football) =

American football player (1915–1979)

Profile
- Position: Center

Personal information
- Born: February 5, 1915; Fairfield, Alabama, U.S. (Note: Gilbert's obituary said he was born Ensley, a neighborhood within Birmingham. Ensley and Fairfield are adjacent to one another.)
- Died: August 19, 1979 (aged 64); Auburn, Alabama, U.S.
- Listed height: 6 ft 2 in (1.88 m)
- Listed weight: 195 lb (88 kg)

Career information
- High school: Darlington School (Rome, Georgia)
- College: Auburn (Alabama Polytechnic)

Awards and highlights
- Second-team All-American (1935); Third-team All-American (1936); SEC Player of the Year (1936); First-team All-SEC (1935, 1936); Second-team All-SEC (1934)
- College Football Hall of Fame (Class of 1956)

Walter Beasley Gilbert (February 5, 1915 – August 19, 1979) was an American gridiron football player, best known for playing college football for Auburn. He was inducted to the College Football Hall of Fame in 1956.

== Biography ==
Gilbert grew up in Fairfield, Alabama, and graduated from Darlington School in Rome, Georgia. He earned three varsity letters (1934–1936) playing football at Alabama Polytechnic Institute, officially renamed Auburn University in 1960. Gilbert was selected to All-America teams in 1935 and 1936, (Note: Some sources describe Gilbert as a three-time All-American; however, he is absent from recognized 1934 College Football All-America Team selections.) and was captain of the 1936 Auburn squad. He starred at center, and also played linebacker. His final season was somewhat hampered by an appendicitis operation he had in December 1935, but he still was voted the "finest team player" (Note: The award is now known as the SEC Player of the Year.) in his conference by coaches of the Southeastern Conference (SEC). Gilbert concluded his college career by playing in the January 1, 1937, edition of the Bacardi Bowl. Contested in Havana, it ended in a 7–7 tie against Villanova. He received All-SEC football honors in each of his three varsity seasons.

While in college, Gilbert was a member of the Pi Kappa Alpha fraternity and the Omicron Delta Kappa honor society. He majored in education. He was selected by the Philadelphia Eagles in the fourth round of the 1937 NFL draft, but he did not play professionally, opting to pursue a career in the oil industry. Gilbert was inducted to the College Football Hall of Fame in 1956, and to the Alabama Sports Hall of Fame in 1974.

In May 1938, Gilbert married Frances Wright; the couple first lived in Savannah, Georgia, where Gilbert was in business. In March 1940, a daughter was born to the couple in Miami. Gilbert served in the United States Army during World War II; entering in February 1942, he attained the rank of major. He worked in management for Texaco for many years, and headed their European operations before his retirement in the late 1970s.

Gilbert died in August 1979; he was survived by two daughters. In July 1980, Auburn announced the creation of the Walter Gilbert Award, given annually to an Auburn graduate who was a varsity athlete and has demonstrated at least 20 years of superior performance in their profession. The award was first issued in May 1981, to Joseph Lester Stewart (1915–2004), who served as an officer in the United States Marine Corp from 1937 to 1965 and retired at the rank of brigadier general. Stewart had served as cadet colonel of Auburn's ROTC brigade and was a fellow 1937 graduate with Gilbert.
