= W. H. Britton =

American football and basketball coach (1892–1982)

Biographical details
- Born: June 4, 1892; Des Moines, Iowa, U.S.
- Died: November 29, 1982 (aged 90); Brooks, Georgia, U.S.
- Education: Army (1916)

Playing career

Football
- 1914–1915: Army

Coaching career (HC unless noted)

Football
- 1916: Hawaii
- 1926–1934: Tennessee (ends)
- 1935: Tennessee
- 1936–1942: Tennessee (ends)
- 1946: Tennessee (ends)

Basketball
- 1926–1935: Tennessee

Head coaching record
- Overall: 7–7–1 (football); 80–73 (basketball)

William Hamilton Britton (June 4, 1892 – November 29, 1982) was an American college football and college basketball coach. He served as the head football coach at the University of Tennessee for one season in 1935, coaching in the absence of Robert Neyland, who left for active duty in the United States Army. Britton's career football record was 4–5. Britton was also the head basketball coach at Tennessee from 1926 to 1935, tallying a mark of 80–73.

After his playing career at the United States Military Academy ended, he was stationed at Fort Shafter in Hawaii, where he served for a season as the head football coach at the University of Hawaii.

== Head coaching record ==
=== Football ===
Year	Team	Overall	Conference	Standing	Bowl/playoffs
Hawaii Deans (Independent) (1916)
1916	Hawaii	3–2–1			
Hawaii:		3–2–1			
Tennessee Volunteers (Southeastern Conference) (1935)
1935	Tennessee	4–5	2–3	T–9th	
Tennessee:		4–5	2–3		
Total:		7–7–1			
