= Billy Chase =

American football player

No. 50
- Position: Halfback

Career information
- High school: Lakeland
- College: Florida (1933–1935)

Awards and highlights
- Third-team All-SEC (1935)

William W. Chase was a college football player. Chase was a prominent halfback for coach Dutch Stanley's Florida Gators of the University of Florida from 1933 to 1935. Chase was a native of Lakeland. A triple threat back, he was elected captain of the 1935 team. Memorably, he returned a kickoff ninety-eight yards against Ole Miss in 1934. He was third-team AP All-SEC.

== See also ==
- List of University of Florida Athletic Hall of Fame members
