= 1935 LSU Tigers football team =

American college football season

1935 LSU Tigers football

SEC champion

Sugar Bowl, L 2–3 vs. TCU
- Conference: Southeastern Conference
- Record: 9–2 (5–0 SEC)
- Head coach: Bernie Moore (1st season)
- Home stadium: Tiger Stadium

1935 Southeastern Conference football standings
	Conf.					Overall
Team		W		L			W		L
No. 7 LSU $	5	–	0	–	0	9	–	2	–	0
Vanderbilt	5	–	1	–	0	7	–	3	–	0
Ole Miss	3	–	1	–	0	9	–	3	–	0
No. 15 Auburn	5	–	2	–	0	8	–	2	–	0
No. 17 Alabama	4	–	2	–	0	6	–	2	–	1
Tulane	3	–	3	–	0	6	–	4	–	0
Kentucky	3	–	3	–	0	5	–	4	–	0
Georgia Tech	3	–	4	–	0	5	–	5	–	0
Mississippi State	2	–	3	–	0	8	–	3	–	0
Tennessee	2	–	3	–	0	4	–	5	–	0
Georgia	2	–	4	–	0	6	–	4	–	0
Florida	1	–	6	–	0	3	–	7	–	0
Sewanee	0	–	6	–	0	2	–	7	–	0
$ – Conference champion; Rankings from United Press

The 1935 LSU Tigers football team represented Louisiana State University (LSU) in the 1935 college football season. The team was led by halfback Abe Mickal and end Gaynell Tinsley. It was Bernie Moore's first of thirteen seasons as head coach of the Tigers.

The Williamson System, an NCAA-designated "major selector" of national championships, ranked TCU first, SMU second, and LSU third in its final post-bowl rankings. The accompanying column notes, though, that "there was no undisputable national champion in 1935". In an apparent error, the NCAA records book notes TCU and LSU as Williamson System national co-champions for the season. the LSU athletic department does not recognize the team as national champions, although their media guide does mention the award's inclusion in the NCAA records book.

== Schedule ==
Date	Opponent	Site	Result	Attendance	Source
September 28	Rice*	Tiger Stadium; Baton Rouge, LA	L 7–10	22,000	
October 5	Texas*	Tiger Stadium; Baton Rouge, LA	W 18–6		
October 12	at Manhattan*	Ebbets Field; Brooklyn, NY	W 32–0	20,000	
October 19	vs. Arkansas*	State Fair Stadium; Shreveport, LA (rivalry)	W 13–7		
October 26	at Vanderbilt	Dudley Field; Nashville, TN	W 7–2		
November 2	Auburn^{†}	Tiger Stadium; Baton Rouge, LA (rivalry)	W 6–0	15,000	
November 9	Mississippi State	Tiger Stadium; Baton Rouge, LA (rivalry)	W 28–13		
November 16	at Georgia	Sanford Stadium; Athens, GA	W 13–0		
November 23	Southwestern Louisiana*	Tiger Stadium; Baton Rouge, LA	W 56–0		
November 30	at Tulane	Tulane Stadium; New Orleans, LA (Battle for the Rag)	W 41–0	34,000	
January 1, 1936	vs. TCU	Tulane Stadium; New Orleans, LA (Sugar Bowl)	L 2–3	35,000	
*Non-conference game; ^{†}Homecoming

== Sugar Bowl ==
Four days of rain turned an expected passing battle into a punting duel between quarterbacks Sammy Baugh of TCU and LSU's Abe Mickal. The Tigers threatened often, once getting to the six-inch line, but TCU's Taldon Manton kicked a winning 36-yard field goal. LSU scored when All-America end Gaynell Tinsley harassed Baugh into throwing an incompletion in the TCU end zone for an automatic safety.
