= Gene Rose (American football end) =

American football player (1913–1986)

No. 26
- Position: End

Personal information
- Born: August 15, 1913; Cincinnati, Ohio, U.S.
- Died: January 16, 1986 (aged 72); Memphis, Tennessee, U.S.
- Listed height: 6 ft 1 in (1.85 m)
- Listed weight: 185 lb (84 kg)

Career information
- High school: Lockland (Lockland, Ohio)
- College: Tennessee
- NFL draft: 1936: 4th round, 36th overall pick

Career history
- New York Giants (1936)

Awards and highlights
- 2× Second-team All-SEC (1934, 1935)

Career NFL statistics
- Receptions: 6
- Receiving yards: 73
- Rushing yards: 13
- Stats at Pro Football Reference

Roy Eugene Rose (August 15, 1913 – January 16, 1986) was an American professional football end in the National Football League (NFL) for the New York Giants. He played college football at the University of Tennessee and was drafted in the fourth round of the 1936 NFL draft with the 36th overall pick. He was the first player out of the University of Tennessee to be drafted into the NFL. He played in seven games in his professional career with the Giants.
