= 1935 Vanderbilt Commodores football team =

American college football season

1935 Vanderbilt Commodores football
- Conference: Southeastern Conference
- Record: 7–3–1 (5–1 SEC)
- Head coach: Ray Morrison (2nd season)
- Captain: Willie Geny
- Home stadium: Dudley Field

1935 Southeastern Conference football standings
	Conf.					Overall
Team		W		L			W		L
No. 7 LSU $	5	–	0	–	0	9	–	2	–	0
Vanderbilt	5	–	1	–	0	7	–	3	–	0
Ole Miss	3	–	1	–	0	9	–	3	–	0
No. 15 Auburn	5	–	2	–	0	8	–	2	–	0
No. 17 Alabama	4	–	2	–	0	6	–	2	–	1
Tulane	3	–	3	–	0	6	–	4	–	0
Kentucky	3	–	3	–	0	5	–	4	–	0
Georgia Tech	3	–	4	–	0	5	–	5	–	0
Mississippi State	2	–	3	–	0	8	–	3	–	0
Tennessee	2	–	3	–	0	4	–	5	–	0
Georgia	2	–	4	–	0	6	–	4	–	0
Florida	1	–	6	–	0	3	–	7	–	0
Sewanee	0	–	6	–	0	2	–	7	–	0
$ – Conference champion; Rankings from United Press

The 1935 Vanderbilt Commodores football team represented Vanderbilt University as a member of the Southeastern Conference during the 1935 college football season. Led by Ray Morrison, who returned for this second season as head coach after having helmed the team in 1918, the Commodores compiled an overall record of 7–3–1 with a mark of 5–1 in conference play, placing second in the SEC. This remains the best conference record that Vanderbilt has had since joining the SEC. The five SEC wins were not matched until the 2012 team went 5–3.

Vanderbilt played is home games at Dudley Field in Nashville, Tennessee. Team captain was Willie Geny.

== Schedule ==
Date	Opponent	Site	Result	Attendance	Source
September 21	Union (TN)*	Dudley Field; Nashville, TN	W 34–0		
September 28	Mississippi State	Dudley Field; Nashville, TN	W 14–9		
October 5	Cumberland (TN)*	Dudley Field; Nashville, TN	W 32–7		
October 11	at Temple*	Beury Stadium; Philadelphia, PA	L 3–6	22,000	
October 19	at Fordham*	Polo Grounds; New York, NY	L 7–13	25,000	
October 26	LSU	Dudley Field; Nashville, TN	L 2–7		
November 2	at Georgia Tech	Grant Field; Atlanta, GA (rivalry)	W 14–13		
November 9	Sewanee^{†}	Dudley Field; Nashville, TN (rivalry)	W 46–0		
November 16	at Tennessee	Shields–Watkins Field; Knoxville, TN (rivalry)	W 13–7		
November 28	Alabama	Dudley Field; Nashville, TN	W 14–6	18,000	
*Non-conference game; ^{†}Homecoming
