= Jim Whatley =

American athlete and coach (1913–2001)

Biographical details
- Born: March 11, 1913; Tuscaloosa, Alabama, U.S.
- Died: May 31, 2001 (aged 88); Athens, Georgia, U.S.

Playing career

Football
- 1933–1935: Alabama
- 1936–1938: Brooklyn Dodgers

Basketball
- 1933–1936: Alabama
- 1938–1939: New York Jewels

Baseball
- 1933–1935: Alabama
- 1937: Jackson Senators
- 1937–1938: Opelousas Indians
- Positions: Tackle (football); Center (basketball); First baseman (baseball)

Coaching career (HC unless noted)

Football
- 1939–1941: Western Carolina
- 1946–1949: Ole Miss (line)
- 1950: Georgia (ends)

Basketball
- 1938–1942: Western Carolina
- 1946–1949: Ole Miss
- 1950–1951: Georgia

Baseball
- 1950: Georgia
- 1952–1975: Georgia

Head coaching record
- Overall: 6–16–2 (football); 83–75 (basketball); 336–326–3 (baseball)

Accomplishments and honors

Championships
- Baseball; 2 SEC regular season (1953–1954)

Awards
- Football; Second-team All-American (1935); All-SEC (1935)

James William "Big Jim" Whatley (March 11, 1913 – May 31, 2001) was an American football, basketball and baseball player and coach. He served as the head football coach at Western Carolina University from 1939 to 1941, after playing minor league baseball for the Jackson Senators of the Cotton States League in 1937 and the Opelousas Indians of the Evangeline Baseball League from 1937 to 1938.

Whatley was born on March 11, 1913, in Tuscaloosa, Alabama. He attended the University of Alabama, where he lettered in football, basketball, baseball, and track and field. Whatley died of heart failure, on May 31, 2001.

== Head coaching record ==
=== Football ===
Year	Team	Overall	Conference	Standing	Bowl/playoffs
Western Carolina Catamounts (North State Conference) (1939–1941)
1939	Western Carolina	1–6–1	0–4–1	T–6th	
1940	Western Carolina	2–5–1	1–4	6th	
1941	Western Carolina	3–5	2–2	4th	
Western Carolina:		6–16–2	3–10–1		
Total:		6–16–2			
