= Willie Geny =

American football and basketball player (1913–1999)

Vanderbilt Commodores
- Position: End

Personal information
- Born: November 14, 1913; Nashville, Tennessee, U.S.
- Died: December 19, 1999 (aged 86); Nashville, Tennessee, U.S.

Career information
- College: Vanderbilt (1933–1935)

Awards and highlights
- SEC Player of the Year (1935); First-team All-SEC (1935); Tennessee Sports Hall of Fame (1985)

Charles F. "Willie" Geny (November 14, 1913 – December 19, 1999) was an American college football and basketball player for the Vanderbilt Commodores. He was football's Southeastern Conference player of the year in 1935. As captain of the Commodores, he led them to their first defeat of rival Tennessee in nine years. He was inducted into the Tennessee Sports Hall of Fame in 1985. He later sold insurance. Geny persuaded Billy Joe Adcock to attend Vanderbilt.
