= Riley Smith (American football) =

American football player and coach (1911–1999)

No. 26, 35
- Position: Quarterback

Personal information
- Born: July 14, 1911; Carrollton, Mississippi, U.S.
- Died: August 9, 1999 (aged 88); Mobile, Alabama, U.S.
- Listed height: 6 ft 2 in (1.88 m)
- Listed weight: 200 lb (91 kg)

Career information
- High school: Greenwood (Greenwood, Mississippi); Columbia (Columbia, Mississippi)
- College: Alabama (1932-1935)
- NFL draft: 1936: 1st round, 2nd overall pick

Career history

Playing
- Boston/Washington Redskins (1936–1938)

Coaching
- Washington and Lee (1939–1940) Backfield coach; Washington and Lee (1941) Head coach

Awards and highlights
- NFL champion (1937); 2× Second-team All-Pro (1936, 1938); National champion (1934); Consensus All-American (1935); Jacobs Blocking Trophy (1935); First-team All-SEC (1935)

Career NFL statistics
- Rushing yards: 58
- Rushing average: 1.3
- Receptions: 18
- Receiving yards: 300
- Passing yards: 290
- TD-INT: 3-3
- Passer rating: 57.3
- Military career
- Allegiance: United States
- Branch: United States Navy
- Service years: 1942–1945
- Rank: Lieutenant Commander
- Conflicts: World War II
- Stats at Pro Football Reference
- College Football Hall of Fame

Riley Henry Smith (July 14, 1911 – August 9, 1999) was an American football player, a quarterback for the Boston Redskins of the National Football League (NFL) during the mid-1930s. He played college football for the University of Alabama, where he was recognized as a consensus All-American. Drafted in the 1936 NFL draft, he is known for being the first drafted player to play football in the NFL; Jay Berwanger, the only player drafted before him, never played due to salary disagreements. He was also the starting quarterback in the first ever postseason game in Redskins history in 1936 when they made the NFL Championship Game.

After his NFL career ended, he became a coach.

== Early life ==
Born in Carrollton, Mississippi, Smith played high school football for Greenwood High School, then moved to Columbus and played at Columbus High School.

== College career ==
Smith attended the University of Alabama in Tuscaloosa, where he played quarterback for the Crimson Tide. He was a passer and runner, but could also block, punt, kick extra points, and boot field goals. He was part of the 1934 team that won the Rose Bowl, was recognized as a consensus first-team All-American in 1935, and also won the Jacobs Blocking Trophy as the best blocker in the Southeastern Conference.

Smith played in the East-West Shrine Game and the College All-Star Game.

== Professional playing career ==
Smith was the second player chosen (behind Jay Berwanger) in the first-ever 1936 NFL draft. In 1936 and 1937 he missed only three minutes in 26 Redskins games, but an injury ended his playing career early.

== Coaching career and later life ==
After retirement as a player, Smith became an assistant coach at Washington and Lee University in Lexington, Virginia, where he was the backfield coach in 1939 in 1940, then succeeded Warren E. Tilson as head coach in 1941. He served in the U.S. Navy as a lieutenant commander from 1942 to 1945 and then became a real estate developer in Mobile, Alabama.

== Head coaching record ==
Year	Team	Overall	Conference	Standing	Bowl/playoffs
Washington and Lee Generals (Southern Conference) (1941)
1941	Washington and Lee	1–6–2	1–2–2	10th	
Washington and Lee:		1–6–2	1–2–2		
Total:		1–6–2			
