= List of Wilmington Clippers players =

This is a complete list of American football players who have played for the Wilmington Clippers of the American Association (AA). It includes players that have appeared in at least one game with the team. The Wilmington Clippers franchise was founded in 1937, and folded following 1949. The Clippers played in three AA Championships (1940, 1941, and 1948), winning once (1941).

== A ==
Verlie Abrams, Ralph Amato, Al Anderson, Bill Anderson, Sig Andrusking, Don Avery

== B ==
Steve Bagarus, Barney Barrett, Vince Bartolomeo, Monk Barton, Frank Basile, Erle Baugher, Chuck Bearoff, Joe Behot, Brian Bell, Tom Bentley, Joe Beradelli, Dave Bernard, Gene Blackwell, Art Blaha, Stuart Bobb, Rankin Britt, George Brodston, Paul Broglio, Bernie Brosky, Blair Brown, George Brown, Don Brownlee, Paul Bruno, Andy Brunski, Mike Bucchianeri, Don Bunge, Joe Byrnes

== C ==
Joe Campbell, Hank Charlton, Paul Chrisholm, Bill Christopher, Albert Clark, Frank Coker, Billy Constable, Ben Coren, Ray Costello, Joe Cutcavage

== D ==
Boley Dancewicz, Morgan Davies, Hermit Davis, Joe Dickerson, Bill Docherty, Les Dodson, Adrian Dodson, Gerry Doherty, Dick Doub, Roger Dughi, Joe Dulkie

== E ==
Weldon Edwards

== F ==
Ed Farrell, Jack Ferrante, Stan Flowers, Irvin Foster, Tony Fusaloro

== G ==
Jim Gaffney, Charlie Gainor, Marty Gainor, Ed Garland, Jimmy German, Wimpy Giddens, Jerry Ginney, Joe Giunta, Oscar Givens, Bill Glenn, Tod Goodwin, Al Gornish, Mario Grandinetti, Walt Gregonis, Bill Grimberg, Stan Gurzynski, Ben Guziewicz

== H ==
Bob Hainlen, Ed Hale, Boggs Hall, George Harris, Hank Harris, Paul Hart, Bill Harwick, Jim Hefti, Wendell Henderson, John Hober, Jack Holz, Skipper Howard, Jim Hunnicutt

== J ==
Marv Jacobs, Al Jarrett, George Jennings, Tom Jones, Len Jordan, Joe Jurich

== K ==
Bernie Kaplan, Bob Kercher, Mike Kerns, Ed King, Elmer Kolberg, Ed Kowalski, Tony Kozma, Eddie Kress, Emmett Kriel, Lenny Krouse, Johnny Kusko, Bert Kuczynski

== L ==
Dick Landis, Bill Lane, San LaPolla, Joe Laputka, Ted Laux, Andy Lazor, Cliff Lebert, Reid Lennon, Vince Lombardi, Jack Lookabaugh, Roy Lorenz, Harry Lorusso, Ed Lovuolo, Johnny Lucente, Mike Lukac, Jack Lythgoe

== M ==
Mike Mandarino, Phil Marion, Pat Martinelli, Roger Mass, Bob Masters, Walt Masters, Ed Matesic, Joe McCarthy, Len McCormick, Forrest McPherson, Pete Mensick, Ed Michaels, Buster Mitchell, Ray Monaco, Tommy Mont, Frank Moock, Bob Morgan, Emmett Mortell, Bobby Musick

== N ==
Stan Nestorak, Joe Nichols, Al Nojunez, Walt Nowak

== O ==
Jim O'Conner, Ollie Oja, Bill Ordway, Merle Osborne

== P ==
Vince Pacewic, Joe Papiano, Chris Pappas, Chris Pavich, Bill Pearson, Mike Penecale, Bill Petrilas, Joe Petro, Ben Plotnicki, Bob Polidor, Johnny Poto, Paul Prettyman, Bill Prohavich

== R ==
Leo Ratamess, Joe Ratica, Jim Reily, Bob Riley, Jim Rinaldi, Johnny Rogers, Danny Roskas, Norm Rushton, Jim Russell, Art Russo

== S ==
Tony Sala, Paul Sarringhaus, Bill Schneller, Ray Siegfried, Bill Simmons, Bill Sinton, Gorge Sirochman, Chuck Slagle, Dick Smith, Joe Snyder, Dean Sophia, Ray Spillers, Johnny Spirida, Ben Starret, Clem Stevens, Cecil Sturgeon, Joe Superka, Bill Sweeney

== T ==
Dick Taubor, Hal Thompson, Joe Thum, Morgan Tiller, Lou Tolliver, Carl Tomasello, Ed Toscani, John Tosi, Will Tullos, Doug Turley, Jay Turner

== V ==
Benny Vaznilis, George Veneroso, Ed Virshup

== W ==
Bucky Walters, Bob Wear, Chick Welde, Larry Weldon, Floyd Wheeler, Bob White, Pete Wiater, Francis Williams, Vic Willis, Jim Woolley

== Y ==
Frank Yablonski

== Z ==
Al Zimba, Vince Zizak
