= 1947 Wilmington Clippers season =

- Head coach: George Veneroso
- Home stadium: Wilmington Park

Results
- Record: 2–5–1
- Division place: Western Division
- Playoffs: Did not qualify

The 1947 Wilmington Clippers season was their eighth season in existence and their fifth in the American Association (American Football League). They finished with a 2–5–1 record. They had one of their best former players, Eddie Michaels return for a final season and be named All-Pro for a fourth time. They were led by quarterbacks Tommy Mont and Frank Moock. They did not qualify for the playoffs. Early in the season, the Clippers made an agreement with the Vineland Senators for the Senators to be their farm team. At that time the Clippers were a farm team of the Washington Redskins.

== Roster ==
1947 Wilmington Clippers roster
Quarterbacks: Paul Hart; Tommy Mont; Frank Moock; Bobby Musick; Halfbacks: Paul Chisholm; Billy Constable; Les Dodson; Jim Gaffney; Lenny Krause; Johnny Lucente; Norm Rushton; Paul Sarringhaus	Fullbacks: Blair Brown; Jim Hefty; Bobby Musick; Vince Pacewic; Ends: Bill Anderson; Chuck Bearoff; George Brodston; Don Brownlee; John Hober; Bert Kuczynski; Joe McCarthy; Carl Tomasello	Guards: Joe Giunta; Al Gornish; Mike Mandarino; Eddie Michaels; George Sirochman; Tackles: Don Avery; Bernie Brosky; Don Bunge; Wimpy Giddens; Mike Kerns; Centers: Bill Harwick; Pat Martinelli; Len McCormick	Head coach: George Veneroso; Assistants: Eddie Michaels (Line); Rookies in italics

== Season ==
=== Schedule ===
Week	Date	Opponent	Result	Attendance
Exhibition	September 16, 1947	at Vineland Senators	W 14–7	5,200
1	September 26, 1947	Wilkes-Barre Barons	W 17-3	4,000–5,000
2	October 1, 1947	Paterson Panthers	L 10–20	4,500
3	October 5, 1947	at Jersey City Giants	L 7–20	6,500
4	October 15, 1988	Jersey City Giants	W 13–0	4,200
5	October 22, 1947	at Bethlehem Bulldogs	L 0–42	11,000
6	November 5, 1947	at Bloomfield Cardinals	L 3–10	4,000
7	November 9, 1947	Richmond Rebels	T 17–17	4,000
8	November 16, 1947	at Paterson Panthers	L 7–35	?
9	November 23, 1947	Bethlehem Bulldogs	Cancelled	—
10	November 30, 1947	at Wilkes-Barre Barons	Cancelled	—

=== Game summaries ===
==== Exhibition: at Vineland Senators ====
Exhibition: Wilmington Clippers at Vineland Senators – Game summary

Quarter	1	2	3	4	Total
Clippers	7	0	7	0	14
Senators	0	7	0	0	7

at Gittone Memorial Stadium, Vineland, New Jersey

- Date: September 16
- Game attendance: 5,200
- Referee: John Collins
- Reference: Clippers 1947 Schedule

In the first game of the season, the Clippers won against the Vineland Senators 14 to 7 in front of 5,200 fans. In the first minute of play, Paul Sarringhaus intercepted a Earl Baugher pass and returned it 60 yards for a touchdown. The Senators responded in the second quarter by an Al Litwa 85–yard interception return. Ted Laux kicked the extra point. The third and final touchdown of the game was a 49 yard pass by quarterback Frank Moock to receiver Lenny Krouse. Moock then kicked the extra point. Shortly after the game an agreement was made for the Vineland Senators to become a Clipper's farm team.

==== Week One: vs. Wilkes-Barre Barons ====
Week One: Wilmington Clippers vs. Wilkes-Barre Barons – Game summary

Quarter	1	2	3	4	Total
Barons	3	0	0	0	3
Clippers	0	0	10	7	17

at Wilmington Park, Wilmington, Delaware

- Date: September 26
- Game attendance: 4,000–5,000
- Referee: John Collins
- Reference: Clippers 1947 Schedule

In the first week of the American Association season, the Clippers won against the Wilkes-Barre Barons 17 to 3. There were 7 fumbles by the Clippers, 6 by the Barons, and multiple interceptions by both teams. The game started with a Wilmington kick to the Wilkes-Barre 44 yard line, followed by 3 rushes for 9 yards before a 42-yard field goal by Johnny Rogalla. The next kickoff went to Clippers' back Bill Anderson, and was returned to midfield. They were able to get to the Wilkes-Barre 34, before quarterback Frank Moock committed one of seven Wilmington fumbles. The Barons were immediately stopped on their next possession and punted. On the Clippers' next possession, they threw an interception on third down which was returned to the Wilmington 29. Soon after, the Barons attempted a 22 yard field goal which was blocked by Billy Constable. In the second quarter, the Clippers were in Wilkes-Barre territory, but interceptions stopped them from scoring. In the third quarter, quarterback Moock threw a deep pass to receiver Lenny Krouse, which he caught between two defenders for a touchdown. In the fourth quarter the Clippers scored the final points of the game, a touchdown by Norm Rushton. Their All-Pro offensive guard and line coach Eddie Michaels was presented an automobile during ceremonies at the game. At the ceremony was Walter W. Bacon and Earle Greasy Neale, along with some of Michaels' former teammates while with the Philadelphia Eagles.

==== Week Two: vs. Paterson Panthers ====
Week One: Wilmington Clippers vs. Paterson Panthers – Game summary

Quarter	1	2	3	4	Total
Panthers	0	13	7	0	20
Clippers	3	0	7	0	10

at Wilmington Park, Wilmington, Delaware

- Date: October 1, 1947
- Game attendance: 4,500
- Referee: Lisetski
- Reference: Clippers 1947 Schedule

The Clippers suffered their first defeat in week two of the regular season. They played the Paterson Panthers and lost 10 to 20. One of the hardest players to stop was Jack Lowther, a former Detroit University player who threw all three Paterson touchdowns. The Clippers had only 13 rushing yards as opposed to 157 by Paterson. The Panthers had better statistics in almost every category. The Clippers scored first, on a 33-yard field goal by Frank Moock. Shortly after the Clippers' field goal, the Panthers launched a 75 yard drive in the second quarter to take the lead 7 to 3. Right after Wilmington got the ball back, they fumbled and Paterson defensive end John Bray recovered. Jack Lowther would then throw a 29 yard pass for a touchdown to extend their lead to 10. In the third quarter, Wilmington's passing attack brought the score within three points, as a deep pass was caught for a 44 yard gain by George Dodson, followed by a 17 yard touchdown pass shortly thereafter. Paterson scored the final points of the game on one of their next drives. Jack Lowther launched a pass while about to be sacked, which was caught by receiver Johnny Bray at the goalline for another score. The Clippers could not come back as the game ended, 10 to 20.

==== Week Three: at Jersey City Giants ====
Week Three: Wilmington Clippers at Jersey City Giants – Game summary

Quarter	1	2	3	4	Total
Clippers	0	0	0	7	7
Giants	7	6	7	0	20

at Roosevelt Stadium, Jersey City, New Jersey

- Date: October 5, 1947
- Game attendance: 6,500
- Reference: Clippers 1947 Schedule

In week three of the 1947 season, the Clippers lost a second game. They lost 7 to 20 against the Jersey City Giants, in front of 6,500 fans. The first touchdown of the game came after Wilmington quarterback Frank Moock threw an interception on the Jersey City 18–yard line, which was returned by Jersey City end Marty O'Hagan. Right before the second quarter ended Jersey City scored a second time, when Marty O'Hagan had a defensive return touchdown again. Jersey City scored their third touchdown in the third quarter on a 42–yard drive. The Clippers finally were able to score late in the fourth quarter, after a 37 yard run by Lenny Krouse, Paul Sarringhaus scored a one–yard touchdown. Wilmington only completed three passes during the game.

==== Week Four: vs. Jersey City Giants ====
Week Three: Wilmington Clippers vs. Jersey City Giants – Game summary

Quarter	1	2	3	4	Total
Giants	0	0	0	0	0
Clippers	0	13	0	0	13

at Wilmington Park, Wilmington, Delaware

- Date: October 15, 1947
- Game attendance: 4,200
- Referee: Gray, Villanova
- Reference: Clippers 1947 Schedule

Wilmington avenged their loss the previous week by shutting out the Jersey City Giants, 13 to 0. The game was played in front of 4,200. They were led by Tommy Mont, who made his first appearance with the team. They were able to outgain Jersey City in rushing 202 yards to 23.
