= Doug Turley =

American football player (1918–1992)

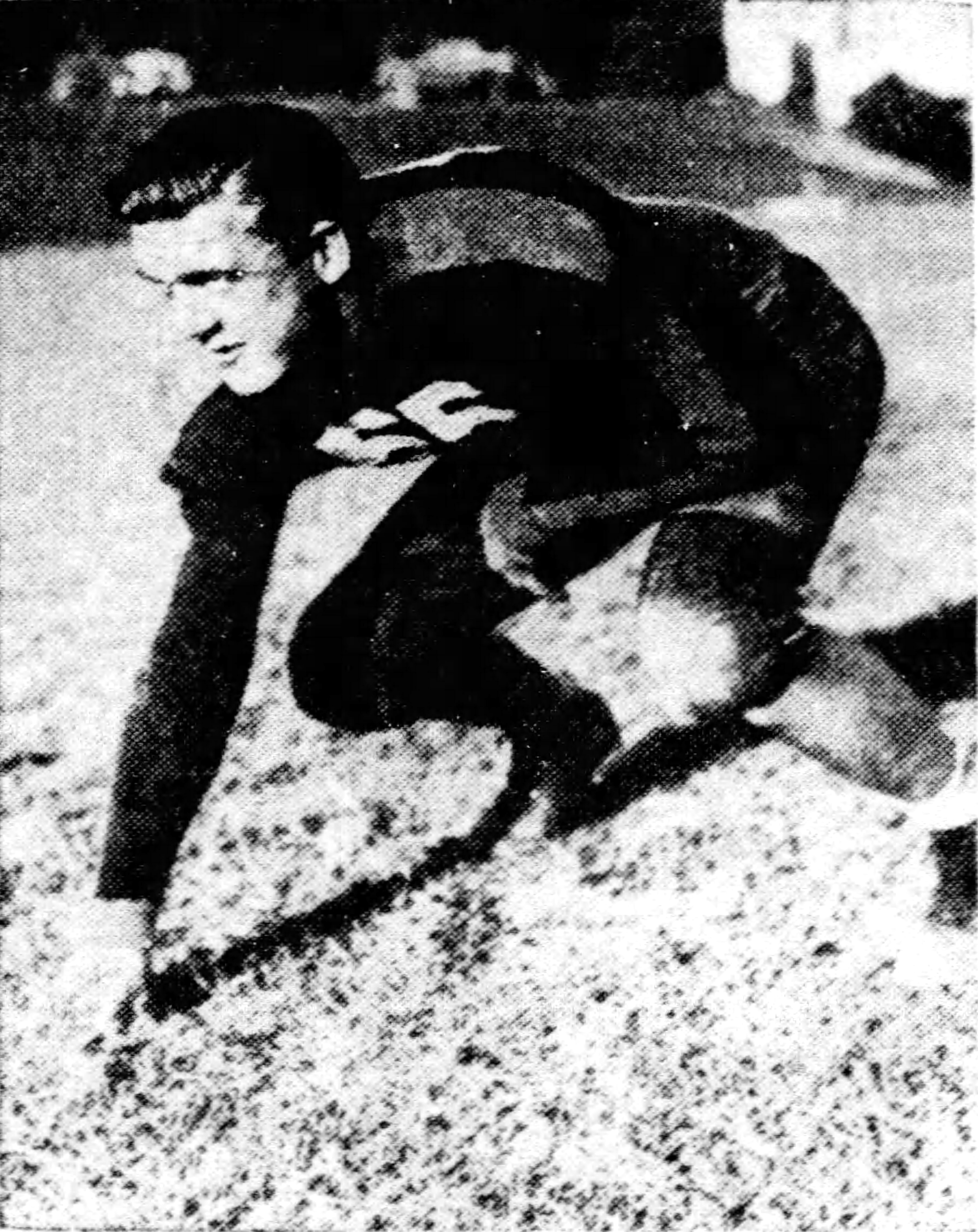
- Turley in 1941

No. 21, 25, 22, 82
- Position: End

Personal information
- Born: November 25, 1918; Nanticoke, Pennsylvania, U.S.
- Died: November 1, 1992 (aged 73); Delaware, U.S.
- Listed height: 6 ft 2 in (1.88 m)
- Listed weight: 215 lb (98 kg)

Career information
- High school: Nanticoke (PA)
- College: Scranton (1936–1939)
- NFL draft: 1940: undrafted

Career history

Playing
- Pittsburgh Steelers (1940); Philadelphia Eagles (1941)*; Wilmington Clippers (1941–1942); Washington Redskins (1944–1948); Wilmington Clippers (1949); Bethlehem Bulldogs (1949)
- * Offseason or practice squad member only

Coaching
- Wilmington Arrows (1943) Head coach; Wilmington Clippers (1949) Head coach

Awards and highlights
- Delaware Sports Hall of Fame (1986)

Career NFL statistics
- Games played: 50
- Receptions: 45
- Receiving yards: 608
- Touchdowns: 4
- Stats at Pro Football Reference

Douglas Pershing Turley (November 25, 1918 – November 1, 1992) was an American professional football player and coach and basketball player. He played end for five seasons for the Washington Redskins of the National Football League (NFL), two with the Wilmington Clippers and one with the Bethlehem Bulldogs of the American Association (AA), and additionally had stints in the NFL with the Pittsburgh Steelers and Philadelphia Eagles. Turley also served as the Clippers' head coach for part of the 1949 season and played basketball with the Wilmington Blue Bombers of the American Basketball League (ABL), in addition to with several semi-professional teams. A resident of Delaware for most of his life, he was inducted into the Delaware Sports Hall of Fame in 1986.

== Early life and education ==
Turley was born on November 25, 1918, in Nanticoke, Pennsylvania. He attended Nanticoke High School and was a standout four-sport athlete, playing baseball, track, basketball and football, and was named All-Scholastic in the latter two. He set the Wyoming Valley record in shotput in 1936 and won the Rogers Memorial Tournament with the Nanticoke Reds basketball team in three consecutive years (1937–1939), additionally being the Nanticoke Red Country League champion from 1937 to 1939.

Turley began attending St. Thomas College (now known as the University of Scranton) in 1936, playing for the freshman sports teams and being described as the "star" of the freshman football squad under coach Pop Jones. He first saw varsity action as a sophomore in 1937, and competed with Carl Tomasello for playing time at the "wing" position. He fractured a bone in his wrist early in the season but continued playing, reportedly turning in his best performances afterwards according to The Tribune. In a game against Saint Joseph's, Turley returned a blocked punt 12 yards for what would be the game-winning touchdown. St. Thomas finished the football season with a final record of 6–1–1. Turley also saw action for the varsity basketball team that year as a reserve, with one newspaper writing that he shows "remarkable improvement."

Turley continued playing for the varsity football team as a junior in 1938, being in addition to a two-way starting end, the team's placekicker at times. He helped them finish with an overall record of 7–2. In 1939, Turley was one of only two starters from the prior year to return to Scranton (having been renamed that year from St. Thomas), along with Carl Tomasello. He served as a team captain and led them to an undefeated record of 7–0–2. Turley graduated in June 1940.

== Professional career ==
=== Football ===
After going unselected in the 1940 NFL draft, Turley was signed as an undrafted free agent by the Pittsburgh Steelers. They had received suggestions to do so from Turley's Scranton coach Tom Davies, as well as from coaches who had opposed him, including Red Edwards (Saint Vincent) and Joe Bach (Niagara). He was released by the Steelers on September 9. Turley signed with the Philadelphia Eagles on July 17, 1941, but was released on September 3. Afterwards, he joined the minor league Wilmington Clippers of the American Association (AA), playing all nine games, five as a starter, while helping them win their only league championship. Wilmington became an independent team in 1942, due to the AA suspending as a result of World War II, and were considered the best pro football team outside of the NFL. Turley appeared in all nine games, eight as a starter, for the 1942 Clippers, contributing to their 8–0–1 record that included wins of over 28 points in all but the season finale, when they tied the Philadelphia Eagles 21–21.

Turley sat out the 1943 season as the Clippers also suspended due to the war. He was head coach of the semi-professional Wilmington Arrows during the year. The NFL held what was described as a "peculiar 'hat trick' drafting scheme" in 1944 in which former American Association players were picked, and Turley ended up being sent to the Washington Redskins. He signed with them at the start of July and ended up making the final roster. Turley appeared in a total of seven games on the year, posting eight receptions for 112 yards with one touchdown. His one score came in a 42–20 win over Card-Pitt and was a 35-yard pass thrown by Sammy Baugh, which would be the longest play of Turley's career.

Turley had his best season in 1945, helping the Redskins reach the NFL Championship Game while totaling 17 catches for 185 yards and one score in 10 games, eight of which he started. He later recalled the championship in an interview with The News Journal's Matt Zabitka:

We played that game [won by the Rams 15–14] in subzero weather. It was 4-below zero. The field was frozen. It was so cold, the bands couldn't play. Their instruments were frozen. And, in those days, they had cameras with oil in them, and they became inoperable. Never forget that one. I played all but 30 seconds of the entire game. That's going both ways, and without all that protective equipment players wear today.

The Los Angeles Times named Turley Washington's most outstanding end during the 1945 season and reported that for his "quiet, unassuming way," he was one of the most popular members of the team. End coach Wayne Millner said that "[Turley's] not spectacular, but he's the most reliable end the Redskins have. He's the one guy certain of making the club. I want to see the rest under fire before passing judgement on them." He played nine games in the 1946 season, four as a starter, and had six catches for 105 yards with no scores.

Turley was pursued by the Wilmington Clippers (having returned to the AA from their suspension) and a team in the All-America Football Conference (AAFC) in 1947, but ultimately remained with Washington. He played 12 games in the 1947 season, three as a starter, and caught six passes for 95 yards and one touchdown. He played his final season with Washington in 1948, playing 12 games, four as a starter, and making eight catches for 111 yards. He additionally scored a touchdown off a 33-yard fumble return.

Turley left the Redskins in 1949 to accept a position as player-coach with the Wilmington Clippers. He became the fifth head coach in the team's history (preceded by Dutch Slagle, Walt Masters, George Veneroso and Les Dodson). Bob Hainlen was announced as an assistant coach and the team began the season with an exhibition on September 1. The Clippers lost their first exhibition to the Hawaiian Warriors, 21–0, before winning their second against the Erie Vets, 21–20. Wilmington opened the regular season with a 38–0 loss to the Richmond Rebels and then defeated the Jersey City Giants 6–0. The Clippers lost their third game, against the Paterson Panthers, by a score of 27–0, after which the team president made a stunning and unprecedented move to demote Turley to being an assistant and replace him with Larry Weldon. He quit the team the day afterwards, subsequently joining the Bethlehem Bulldogs in a playing role. Weldon made his coaching debut against Bethlehem on the day of Turley's signing, and the Bulldogs defeated the Clippers by a score of 22–7. With Bethlehem, Turley was switched from being an end to a tackle. He appeared in five games for the Bulldogs, three as a starter, before retiring. He finished his career with 50 games in the NFL, 19 as a starter, and 45 catches for 608 yards and four total touchdowns, along with 23 games played in minor leagues with Wilmington and Bethlehem.

=== Basketball and baseball ===
Turley also played several seasons of semi-professional basketball and baseball as well as some professional basketball. In the 1941–42 season, he was a member of both the Pusey & Jones basketball team with several Clippers teammates, as well as St. Nicholas' in the C. Y. O. Basketball League. In 1943, he played baseball for Pusey & Jones. Turley played basketball in the C. Y. O. League with Sacred Heart at the start of the 1943–44 season, before later joining St. Ann's. He was named to the league all-star squad.

In the 1944–45 season, Turley played for St. Ann's and for the professional Wilmington Blue Bombers of the American Basketball League (ABL). With Wilmington, he appeared in two regular season games and one playoff match, totaling one field goal and one free throw for three points in the regular season, while having two points off of a field goal in the playoffs. In the 1945–46 season, Turley played with a team in Nanticoke, scoring 70 total points on 16 free throws and 27 field goals while playing 17 games. In 1946–47, he played for a team known as the Washington Redskins, partly made up of players from the football team. He joined the Sunbury Mercuries in 1947–48.

== Personal life and death ==
Turley married Sylvia Maga in November 1940 and had two children with her. He moved to Delaware when he joined the Clippers, and lived there for the rest of his life. He later coached St. Elizabeth's in the C. Y. O. League to five championships. He worked for DuPont until retiring in 1981. Turley was inducted into the Delaware Sports Hall of Fame in 1986, and into the Luzerne County Sports Hall of Fame in 1990. He died on November 1, 1992, in Delaware, at the age of 74.
