= 1942 Wilmington Clippers season =

- Head coach: George Veneroso
- Home stadium: Wilmington Park

Results
- Record: 8–0–1
- Division place: No divisions
- Playoffs: No playoffs

The 1942 Wilmington Clippers season was their sixth season in existence. Due to World War II, the 1942 American Association season was cancelled. So the Wilmington Clippers became Independent and posted a 8–0–1 record. Their head coach was George Veneroso. They ended the season with a 21–21 tie against the Philadelphia Eagles with 8,500 in attendance.

== Schedule ==
The table below was compiled using the information from The Pro Football Archives. The winning teams score is listed first. If a cell is greyed out and has "N/A", then that means there is an unknown figure for that game. Green-colored rows indicate a win; yellow-colored rows indicate a tie; and red-colored rows indicate a loss.

Game	Date	Opponent	Result	Venue	Attendance	Record
1	September 27, 1942	Paterson Panthers	Cancelled	Wilmington Park	—N/a	0–0
2	October 3, 1942	Long Island Clippers	38–0 W	Wilmington Park	3,500	1–0
3	October 11, 1942	Camden Cruisers	42–6 W	—N/a	—N/a	2–0
4	October 18, 1942	Hartford Blues	48–7 W	Wilmington Park	4,500	3–0
5	October 25, 1942	Buffalo Bisons	59–9 W	Wilmington Park	4,000	4–0
6	October 28, 1942	Chester Lloyd A.C.	34–0 W	Lloyd Park	2,000	5–0
7	November 1, 1942	Paterson Panthers	Cancelled	Hinchcliffe Stadium	—N/a	5–0
8	November 4, 1942	Fort DuPont	70–0 W	Wilmington Park	1,500	6–0
9	November 8, 1942	Hartford Blues	28–0 W	Municipal Stadium	2,000	7–0
10	November 15, 1942	Fort Ethan Allen	77–0 W	Wilmington Park	2,500	8–0
11	November 22, 1942	Philadelphia Eagles	21–21 T	Wilmington Park	8,500	8–0–1
