= 1941 Wilmington Clippers season =

- Head coach: George Veneroso
- Home stadium: Wilmington Park

Results
- Record: 4-3-2 (7-3-2 Unofficial)
- Division place: No divisions
- Playoffs: Won Championship (Long Island Indians, 21-13)

The 1941 Wilmington Clippers season was their fifth season in existence and their third in the American Association. Their official record was 4-3-2 but their record with exhibition games was 7–3–2. They made the playoffs and won the championship 21–13 against the Long Island Indians. Their head coach was George Veneroso.

== Schedule ==
Home games on November 23 against the Hartford Blues and the New York Yankees were cancelled.

Game	Date	Opponent	Result	Venue	Attendance	Record
— (Note: Exhibition game.)	September 14, 1941	Norristown L.A.M.s	W 14–0	L.A.M. Stadium	3,000	
1	September 21, 1941	Long Island Indians	L 6–13	Wilmington Park	5,000	0–1
2	September 28, 1941	Paterson Panthers	T 0–0	Hinchliffe Stadium	6,500	0–1–1
3	October 3, 1941	Jersey City Giants	T 0–0	Wilmington Park	4,200	0–1–2
4	October 12, 1941	Newark Bears	L 13–16	Wilmington Park	5,100	0–2–2
5	October 19, 1941	Jersey City Giants	W 27–7	Roosevelt Stadium	6,600	1–2–2
6	October 26, 1941	New York Yankees	W 16–0	Wilmington Park	5,000	2–2–2
7	November 2, 1941	Long Island Indians	L 7–13	Memorial Stadium	7,209	2–3–2
—	November 9, 1941	Fort DuPont	W 34–0	Wilmington Park	4,500	
8	November 16, 1941	Newark Bears	W 23–7	Schools Stadium	6,200	3–3–2
9	November 30, 1941	Paterson Panthers	W 28–27	Wilmington Park	6,000	4–3–2
—	December 7, 1941	Richmond Arrows	W 17–0	Wilmington Park	2,500	

== Playoffs ==
The Clippers made the playoffs and beat the Paterson Panthers 33–0. Then they beat the Long Island Indians 21–13 in the championship. The championship game is in Bold.

Game	Date	Opponent	Result	Venue	Attendance	Record
1	December 14, 1941	Paterson Panthers	33-0 W	Wilmington Park	4,500	4–3–2
2	**December 21, 1941**	**Long Island Indians**	**21-13 W**	**Wilmington Park**	**6,500**	**4-3-2**
