= 1937 Wilmington Clippers season =

- Head coach: Dutch Slagle
- Home stadium: Pennsy Field

Results
- Record: 5-4
- Division place: No divisions
- Playoffs: No playoffs

The 1937 Wilmington Clippers season was their first season in existence. The team was independent and posted a 5–4 record. Their head coach was Dutch Slagle. They had Vince Lombardi on their roster in 1937.

== Schedule ==
The table below was compiled using the information from The Pro Football Archives. The winning teams score is listed first. If a cell is greyed out and has "N/A", then that means there is an unknown figure for that game. Green-colored rows indicate a win; yellow-colored rows indicate a tie; and red-colored rows indicate a loss.

Game	Date	Opponent	Result	Venue	Attendance	Record
1	August 19, 1937	Philadelphia Eagles	14-6 L	Pennsy Field	4,000	0-1
2	September 19, 1937	Washington Redskins	Cancelled	—	—	0-1
3	September 26, 1937	Richmond Arrows	25-7 W	Pennsy Field	3,000	1-1
4	October 4, 1937	Brooklyn Dodgers	48-12 L	Pennsy Field	4,500	1-2
5	October 10, 1937	New York Giants	19-0 L	Pennsy Field	2,000	1-3
6	October 18, 1937	Washington Presidents	13-6 W	Pennsy Field	1,000	2-3
7	October 24, 1937	Brooklyn Bushwicks	21–0 W	Pennsy Field	3,000	3-3
8	October 31, 1937	Brooklyn Eagles	14-6 L	Pennsy Field	4,800	3-4
9	November 14, 1937	Reading Keys	54-0 W	Pennsy Field	4,000	4-4
10	November 21, 1937	Alexandria/St. Mary's Celtics	20-0 W	Pennsy Field	3,000	5-4
11	December 5, 1937	Baltimore Blue Birds	Cancelled	Pennsy Field	—	5-4
