= List of books about the Napoleonic Wars =

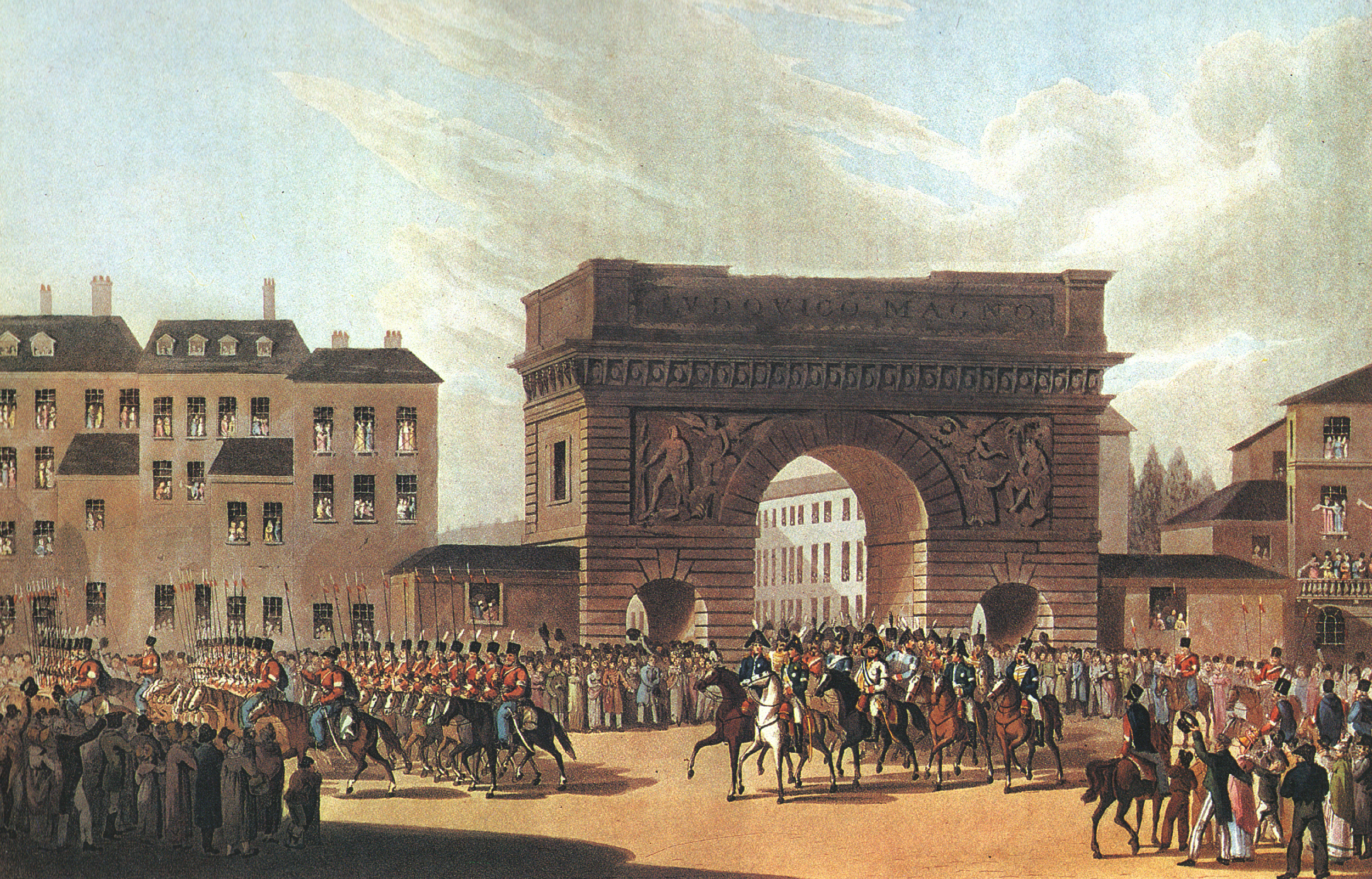
The Russian army enters Paris in 1814

This is a non-fiction bibliography of works about the Napoleonic Wars as selected by editors.

== General ==
- Bruce, Robert B.; Dickie, Iain; Kiley, Kevin; Pavkovic, Michael F.; Schneid, Frederick C. (2008). Fighting Techniques of the Napoleonic Age 1792~1815. London: Amber Books. ISBN 978-1905704828.
- Chandler, David G. (1966). The Campaigns of Napoleon. New York: Macmillan. ISBN 978-0025236608.
- Chandler, David G. (1979). Dictionary of the Napoleonic Wars. New York: Macmillan. ISBN 978-0853683537.
- Chandler, David G. (1987) [First published 1831]. The Military Maxims of Napoleon. London: Greenhill Books. ISBN 978-0947898649.
- Chandler, David G. (1990). The Illustrated Napoleon. London: Greenhill. ISBN 978-1853670862.
- Chandler, David G. (1994). On the Napoleonic Wars. London: Greenhill Books. ISBN 978-1853671586.
- Esposito, Brigadier General Vincent J.; Elting, Colonel John R. (1999) [First published 1964]. A Military History and Atlas of the Napoleonic Wars (New ed.). London: Greenhill Books. ISBN 978-1853673467.
- Fremont, Gregory-Barnes, ed. (2006). The Encyclopedia of the French Revolutionary and Napoleonic Wars. Santa Barbara, CA: ABC-CLIO. ISBN 978-1851096466.
- Glover, Michael (1980) [First published 1979]. The Napoleonic Wars: an illustrated history 1792–1815. London: Book Club Associates. ISBN 978-0713417234.
- Haythornthwaite, Philip J. (1990). The Napoleonic Source Book. London: Cassell & Co. ISBN 978-1854092878.
- Herold, J. Christopher (2002) [First published 1963]. The Age of Napoleon. London: Weidenfeld & Nicolson. ISBN 978-1842125656.
- Hodge, Carl Cavanagh, ed. (2008). Encyclopedia of the Age of Imperialism, 1800–1914. Vols. 1 & 2. Westport, CT: Greenwood Press. ISBN 978-0313334047.
- Jaques, Tony (2006). Dictionary of Battles and Sieges. Santa Barbara, CA: Greenwood Publishing Group. ISBN 978-0313335365.
- Konstam, Angus (2003). Historical Atlas of the Napoleonic Era. London: Mercury Books. ISBN 978-1904668046.
- McNab, Chris, ed. (2011) [First published 2009]. Armies of the Napoleonic Wars. Oxford: Osprey Publishing. ISBN 978-1849086486.
- Mikaberidze, Alexander (2020). The Napoleonic Wars: A Global History. Oxford University Press.
- Nosworthy, Brent (1995). Battle Tactics of Napoleon and His Enemies. London: Constable and Company. ISBN 978-0094772403.
- Over, Keith (1976). Flags and Standards of the Napoleonic Wars. London: Bivouc Books. ISBN 978-0856800122.
- Pivka, Otto von (1979). Armies of the Napoleonic Era. Newton Abbot, UK: David & Charles. ISBN 978-0715377666.
- Riley, Jonathon P. (2000). Napoleon and the World War of 1813: Lessons in Coalition Warfighting. London: Routledge. ISBN 978-0714648934.

External videos
- Booknotes interview with Andrew Roberts on Napoleon & Wellington: The Battle of Waterloo and the Great Commanders Who Fought It, January 12, 2003, C-SPAN

- Roberts, Andrew (2001). Napoleon and Wellington. London: Weidenfeld & Nicolson. ISBN 978-0297646075.
- Rose, J. Holland (1935) [First published 1894]. The Revolutionary and Napoleonic Era 1789–1815 (7th ed.). Cambridge: Cambridge University Press.
- Rothenberg, Gunther E. (1977). The Art of Warfare in the Age of Napoleon. London: B.T. Batsford. ISBN 978-0713409338.
- Rothenberg, Gunther E. (1999). Keegan, John. ed. The Napoleonic Wars. London: Cassell & Co. ISBN 978-0304352678.
- Smith, Digby (1998). The Greenhill Napoleonic Wars Data Book. London: Greenhill Books. ISBN 978-1853672767.
- Taylor, Brian (2006). The Empire of the French. Stroud, UK: Spellmount. ISBN 978-1862272545.
- Wellesley, Arthur (1837–1839). Gurwood, John. ed. The dispatches of Field Marshal the Duke of Wellington: During his various campaigns in India, Denmark, Portugal, Spain, the Low Countries, and France, from 1799 to 1818. Vols. I–XII. London: John Murray.

== Battles ==
- Adkin, Mark (2001). The Waterloo Companion: The Complete Guide to History's Most Famous Land Battle. London: Aurum Press. ISBN 978-1854107640.
- Ayrton, Michael; Taylor, John (2008). The Sharpest Fight: The 95th Rifles at Tarbes, 20th March 1814. London: Forbitou Books. ISBN 978-0955486005.
- Barbero, Alessandro (2005). The Battle: A New History Of Waterloo. Walker & Company. ISBN 978-1843543107.
- Chandler, David G. (1993) [First published 1980]. Waterloo: The Hundred Days. London: Osprey. ISBN 978-0540011704.
- Chartrand, René (2001). Vimeiro 1808. Oxford: Osprey Publishing. ISBN 978-1841763095.
- Chartrand, René (2001). Bussaco 1810. Oxford: Osprey Publishing. ISBN 978-1841763101.
- Chartrand, René (2001). Fuentes de Oñoro 1811. Oxford: Osprey Publishing. ISBN 978-1841763118.
- Duffy, Christopher (1999) [First published 1972]. Borodino and the War of 1812. London: Cassell & Co. ISBN 978-0304352784.
- Duffy, Christopher (1999) [First published 1977]. Austerlitz 1805. London: Cassell & Co. ISBN 978-0304352791.
- Fletcher, Ian; Younghusband, Tony (1997). Salamanca 1812. Oxford: Osprey Publishing. ISBN 978-1855326040.
- Fletcher, Ian (1996). Vittoria 1813. Oxford: Osprey Publishing. ISBN 978-1855327399.
- Haythornthwaite, Philip J. (1996). Die Hard!. London: Arms & Armour Press. ISBN 978-1854092458.
- Hibbert, Christopher (1998). Waterloo. Ware, UK: Wordsworth Editions. ISBN 978-1853266874.
- Howarth, David (1997) [First published 1968]. Waterloo: A Near Run Thing (Reissued 2003 ed.). London: Phoenix. ISBN 978-1842127193.
- Mikaberidze, Alexander (2007). The Battle of Borodino: napoleon versus Kutuzov. Barnsley: Pen&Sword.
- Mikaberidze, Alexander (2010). The Battle of the Berezina: Napoleon's Great Escape. Barnsley: Pen&Sword.
- Muir, Rory (2000). Tactics and the Experience of Battle in the Age of Napoleon. London: Yale University Press. ISBN 978-0300082708.
- Sutherland, Jonathan (2003). Napoleonic Battles. Shrewsbury, UK: Airlife. ISBN 978-1840374230.
- Uffindell, Andrew (2003). Great Generals of the Napoleonic Wars and their Battles 1805–1815. Staplehurst, UK: Spellmount. ISBN 978-1862271777.

== Biographies ==
- Asprey, Robert (2000). The Rise and Fall of Napoleon Bonaparte: Volume I – The Rise. London: Abacus. ISBN 978-0349112886.
- Asprey, Robert (2001). The Rise and Fall of Napoleon Bonaparte: Volume II – The Fall. London: Abacus. ISBN 978-0349114842.
- Chandler, David G., ed. (1987). Napoleon's Marshals. London: Weidenfeld & Nicolson. ISBN 978-0297791249.
- Chandler, David G. (2002) [First published 1973]. Napoleon. Barnsley, UK: Leo Cooper. ISBN 978-0850527506.
- Barnett, Correlli (1997). Bonaparte. Ware, UK: Wordsworth Editions. ISBN 978-1853266782.
- Cornwall, James-Marshall (1998). Napoleon: As Military Commander. New York: Barnes & Noble Books. ISBN 978-0760708606.
- Corrigan, Gordon (2006) [First published 2001]. Wellington: A Military Life. London: Hambledon Continuum. ISBN 978-1852855154.
- Cronin, Vincent (1973). Napoleon. Harmondsworth, UK: Pelican Books. ISBN 978-0140217162.
- Dwyer, Philip (2007). Napoleon: The Path to Power 1769–1799. London: Bloomsbury. ISBN 978-0747566779.
- Dywer, Philip (2013). Citizen Emperor: Napoleon in Power 1799–1815. London: Bloomsbury. ISBN 978-0747578086.
- Ellis, Geoffrey (1996). Napoleon (Profiles in Power). Harlow, UK: Longman. ISBN 978-0582025486.
- Englund, Steven (2004). Napoleon: A Political Life. Harvard: University Press. ISBN 978-0674018037.
- Falk, Avner (2007). Napoleon Against Himself: A Psychobiography. Charlottesville, VA: Pitchstone Publishing. ISBN 978-0972887564.
- Fournier, August [First published 1903]. Napoleon the First: A Biography. New York: Henry Holt And Company. ISBN 978-1154793642.
- Holmes, Richard (2007) [First published 2003]. Wellington The Iron Duke. London: HarperCollins. ISBN 978-0007137503.
- Longford, Elizabeth (1969). Wellington: The Years of The Sword. London: Weidenfeld & Nicolson. ISBN 978-0297179177.
- Longford, Elizabeth (1992) [1969/72]. Wellington (abridged ed.). London: Weidenfeld & Nicolson. ISBN 978-0297812739.
- Roberts, Andrew (2014). Napoleon: A Life.
- Six, Georges (1934) Dictionnaire biographique des généraux et amiraux français de la Révolution et de l'Empire: 1792-1814. Paris, Librairie Historique et Nobiliare. Tome I (A–J) Tome II (K–Z) (in French)
- Zamoyski Adam (2018). Napoleon: A Life.

== Campaigns ==
- Gill, John H. (2018). With Eagles to Glory: Napoleon and his German Allies in the 1809 Campaign.
- Knight, Roger (2015). Britain Against Napoleon: The Organization Of Victory; 1793-1815. Penguin. ISBN 978-0141038940.
- Lieven, Dominic (2010). Russia Against Napoleon: The True Story of the Campaigns of War and Peace.
- Nafziger, George (2009). Napoleon's Invasion of Russia.
- Zamoyski, Adam (2004). 1812: Napoleon’s Fatal March on Moscow: Napoleon's Fatal March on Moscow.

== Forces ==
- Haythornthwaite, Philip J. (2001). Napoleonic Infantry. London: Cassell & Co. ISBN 978-0304355099.
- Haythornthwaite, Philip J. (2001). Napoleonic Cavalry. London: Cassell & Co. ISBN 978-0304355082.

=== British ===
- Bluth, B.J. (2003). Marching With Sharpe. London: HarperCollins. ISBN 978-0004145372.
- Fletcher, Ian (2000) [First Published 1996]. Napoleonic Wars: Wellington's Army. London: Brassey's Military Books. ISBN 978-1857532210.
- Fletcher, Ian (2005) [First published 1994]. Wellington's Regiments: The Men and their Battles 1808–1815. Staplehurst, UK: Spellmount. ISBN 978-1873376065.
- Fletcher, Ian; Poulter, Ron (1992). Gentlemen's Sons. Tunbridge Wells, UK: Spellmount. ISBN 978-1873376003.
- Harrison, Keith; Smith, Eric (2008). Rifle-Green by Nature: A Regency Naturalist and his Family, William Elford Leach. London: The Ray Society. ISBN 978-0903874359. (actions of the 95th Rifles)
- Haythornthwaite, Philip J. (1996) [First published 1987]. British Infantry of the Napoleonic Wars. London: Arms & Armour Press. ISBN 978-1854093264.
- Haythornthwaite, Philip J. (1997) [First published 1989]. Wellington's Military Machine. Staplehurst, UK: Spellmount. ISBN 978-1873376805.
- Haythornthwaite, Philip J. (1998) [First published 1994]. The Armies of Wellington. London: Arms & Armour Press. ISBN 978-1860198496.
- Holmes, Richard (2001). Redcoat. London: HarperCollins. ISBN 978-0006531524.
- Porter, Maj Gen Whitworth (1889). History of the Corps of Royal Engineers Vol I. Chatham: The Institution of Royal Engineers.
- Morgan, Matthew (2004). Wellington's Victories: A Guide to Sharpe's Army. London: Andrews McMeel Publishing. ISBN 978-1843170938.
- Reid, Stuart (2004). Wellington's Army in the Peninsular 1809–14. Oxford: Osprey Publishing. ISBN 978-1841765174.
- Urban, Mark (2004) [2003]. Rifles. London: Faber and Faber. ISBN 978-0571216819.

=== French ===
- Chartrand, René (2000) [First Published 1996]. Napoleonic Wars: Napoleon's Army. London: Brassey's Military Books. ISBN 978-1574883060.
- Blond, Georges (1995) [First published 1979]. La Grande Armée. Translated by Marshall May. London: Arms & Armour Press. ISBN 978-1854092526.
- Elting, John R. (1988). Swords Around a Throne: Napoleon's Grande Armée. London: Weidenfeld & Nicolson. ISBN 978-0297795902.
- Griffith, Paddy (2007). French Napoleonic Infantry Tactics 1792–1815. Oxford: Osprey Publishing. ISBN 978-1846032783.
- Haythornthwaite, Philip J. (1995) [First published 1988]. Napoleon's Military Machine. Staplehurst, UK: Spellmount. ISBN 978-1873376461.
- Smith, Digby (2000). Napoleon's Regiments. London: Greenhill Books. ISBN 978-1853674136.

=== Prussian ===
- Schmidt, Oliver (2003). Prussian Regular Infantryman 1808–15. Oxford: Osprey Publishing. ISBN 978-1841760568.
- Pivka, Otto von (1973). The Black Brunswickers. Oxford: Osprey Publishing. ISBN 978-0850451467.
- Young, Peter (1973). Blücher's Army 1813–1815. Oxford: Osprey Publishing. ISBN 978-0850451177.

== Uniforms and equipment ==
- Haythornthwaite, Philip J. (1998). Weapons & Equipment of the Napoleonic Wars. London: Arms & Armour Press. ISBN 978-1854094957.
- Over, Keith (1976). Flags and Standards of the Napoleonic Wars. London: Bivouac Books. ISBN 978-0856800122.
- Smith, Digby (2006). An Illustrated Encyclopedia of Uniforms of the Napoleonic Wars. London: Lorenz Books. ISBN 978-0754815716.
- Windrow, Martin; Embleton, Gerry (1974). Military Dress of the Peninsular War 1804–1814. New York: Hippocrene Books. ISBN 978-0882542737.

== Naval ==
- Adkin, Mark (2005). The Trafalgar Companion: The Complete Guide to History's Most Famous Sea Battle and the Life of Admiral Lord Nelson. London: Aurum Press. ISBN 978-1845130183.
- Davies, David (1996). Fighting Ships: Ships of the Line 1793–1815. London: Constable. ISBN 978-0094760202.
- Davies, Paul (1972). The Battle of Trafalgar. London: Pan Books. ISBN 978-0345027252.
- Fitchett, W.H. (2007). Naval Battles of the Napoleonic Wars. UK: Leonaur. ISBN 978-1846773136.
- Fremont, Gregory-Barnes (2007). The Royal Navy 1793–1815. Oxford: Osprey Publishing. ISBN 978-1846031380.
- Goodwin, Peter (2002). Nelson's Ships: A History of the Vessels in Which He Served 1771–1805. London: Conway Maritime Press. ISBN 978-0851777429.
- Knight, Roger (2022). Convoys: The British Struggle Against Napoleonic Europe and America. Yale University Press. ISBN 978-0300246971.
- Lavery, Brian (1992) [First published 1989]. Nelson's Navy: The Ships, Men and Organisation 1793–1815. London: Conway Maritime Press. ISBN 978-0851775210.
- Pivka, Otto von (1980). Navies of the Napoleonic Era. Newton Abbot, UK: David & Charles. ISBN 978-0715377673.
- Warner, Oliver (1971) [First published 1965]. Nelson's Battles. Newton Abbot, UK: David & Charles. ISBN 978-0715351697.
- White, Colin (2002). The Nelson Encyclopaedia. Rochester, UK: Chatham Publishing. ISBN 978-1861761859.

== Peninsular War ==
- Fletcher, Ian (2003). Fortresses of the Peninsular 1808–14. Oxford: Osprey Publishing. ISBN 978-1841765778.
- Gates, David (2002) [First published 1986]. The Spanish Ulcer: A History of the Peninsular War. Pimlico. ISBN 978-0712697309.
- Lachouque, Commandant Henry; Tranie, Jean; Carmigniani, J.-C. (1982) [First published 1978 in French]. Napoleon's War in Spain. London: Arms and Armour. ISBN 978-1854092199.
- Napier, Sir William Francis Patrick (1835–40). History of the War in the Peninsula and in the South of France from the Year 1807 to the Year 1814. Vols. I–VI. London: Thomas & William Boone.
- Napier, Sir William Francis Patrick (1852). English Battles and Sieges in The Peninsula: Extracted from his 'Peninsula War'. London: Chapman and Hall.
- Oman, Charles (1902–30). A History of the Peninsular War. Vols I–VII. Oxford: Clarendon Press.
- Parkinson, Roger (2000) [First published 1973]. The Peninsular War. Ware, UK: Wordsworth Editions. ISBN 978-1840222289.
- Tranié, Jean; Carmigniani, Juan Carlos (1982). Napoleon's War in Spain: The French Peninsular Campaigns, 1807–1814. Translated by Mallender, Janet S.; Clements, John R. based on the notes and documents of the late Commandant Henry Lachouque (1883–1971) (reprint ed.). Arms and Armour Press. ISBN 978-0-85-368506-7. "First published 1978 in French"
- Weller, Jac (1999) [First published 1963]. Wellington in the Peninsula. London: Greenhill Books. ISBN 978-1853673818.

== Invasion of Russia ==
- Smith, Digby (2002) [First published 1977]. Armies of 1812. Staplehurst, UK: Spellmount. ISBN 978-1862271654.
