= List of Colgate Raiders in the NFL draft =

This is a list of Colgate Raiders football players in the NFL draft.

== Key ==
B	Back	K	Kicker	NT	Nose tackle
C	Center	LB	Linebacker	FB	Fullback
DB	Defensive back	P	Punter	HB	Halfback
DE	Defensive end	QB	Quarterback	WR	Wide receiver
DT	Defensive tackle	RB	Running back	G	Guard
E	End	T	Offensive tackle	TE	Tight end

== Selections ==
Year	Round	Pick	Overall	Player	Team	Position
1936	7	2	56	Don Irwin	Washington Redskins	B
1936	7	8	62	Charles Wasicek	Detroit Lions	T
1936	9	6	78	Dan Fortmann	Chicago Bears	G
1938	7	1	51	Marcel Chesbro	Cleveland Rams	G
1941	13	1	111	Joe Hoague	Philadelphia Eagles	B
1941	22	3	198	Dave Buck	Chicago Bears	T
1942	11	10	100	Bill Geyer	Chicago Bears	B
1943	23	10	220	Tom Vohs	Washington Redskins	T
1943	28	3	263	Steve Poleshuk	Brooklyn Dodgers	G
1944	1	8	8	Mike Micka	Washington Redskins	B
1944	16	3	156	Jules Yakapovich	Detroit Lions	B
1944	17	6	170	Charley Cusick	Green Bay Packers	G
1944	18	7	182	John Batorski	Washington Redskins	E
1944	32	3	327	Bob Endres	Chicago Bears	T
1945	18	8	138	Ed Stacco	Washington Redskins	T
1946	25	8	238	Ed Stacco	Detroit Lions	T
1947	8	9	64	Frank Muehlheuser	New York Giants	B
1947	16	9	144	Bob Orlando	New York Giants	G
1948	11	9	94	Paul Redfield	Pittsburgh Steelers	T
1949	19	3	184	Bob Reich	Boston Yanks	T
1950	23	6	293	Warren Davis	New York Giants	C
1951	7	9	83	Alan Egler	Los Angeles Rams	B
1951	24	10	289	Harry Abeltin	Los Angeles Rams	T
1952	22	2	255	Karl Kluckhohn	Green Bay Packers	E
1956	11	10	131	Tom Powell	Washington Redskins	G
1956	14	10	167	Milt Graham	Chicago Bears	E
1957	13	6	151	Jack Call	Baltimore Colts	B
1957	28	8	333	Guy Martin	Washington Redskins	B
1961	20	14	280	Jacque MacKinnon	Philadelphia Eagles	B
1967	13	21	336	Ray Ilg	Boston Patriots	LB
1967	15	25	392	Jim Schneider	Green Bay Packers	DT
1968	11	4	277	Marv Hubbard	Oakland Raiders	TE
1970	17	18	434	Alvin Pearman	Baltimore Colts	WR
1971	12	25	311	Steve Goepel	Dallas Cowboys	QB
1971	15	23	387	John Lennon	San Francisco 49ers	T
1974	3	23	75	Mark van Eeghen	Oakland Raiders	RB
1978	12	22	328	John Gibney	New England Patriots	C
1979	11	4	279	Paul Lawler	Buffalo Bills	DB
1984	9	23	247	Rich Erenberg	Pittsburgh Steelers	RB
1985	9	8	232	Steve Calabria	Tampa Bay Buccaneers	QB
1988	10	2	251	Kenny Gamble	Kansas City Chiefs	RB
