= 1946 Wilmington Clippers season =

- Head coach: Les Dodson
- Home stadium: Wilmington Stadium

Results
- Record: 1-7-2 (2-8-2 Unofficial)
- Division place: Western Division
- Playoffs: No playoffs

The 1946 Wilmington Clippers season was their seventh season and their fourth season in the American Association. They had a 1-7-2 record which was their worst season.

== Schedule ==
The table below was compiled using the information from The Pro Football Archives. The winning teams score is listed first. If a cell is greyed out and has "N/A", then that means there is an unknown figure for that game. Green-colored rows indicate a win; yellow-colored rows indicate a tie; and red-colored rows indicate a loss. Games in Italics are Exhibition and do not count towards their record.

Game	Date	Opponent	Result	Venue	Attendance	Record
1	September 10, 1946	Vineland Senators	3-6 L	—	—	0-0
2	September 22, 1946	Paterson Panthers	3-0 W	Hinchliffe Stadium	6,000	1-0
3	September 29, 1946	Scranton Miners	26-0 L	Wilmington Stadium	6,500	1-1
4	October 6, 1946	Newark Bombers	7-7 T	Schools Stadium	3,000	1-1-1
5	October 13, 1946	Bethlehem Bulldogs	13-0 L	Wilmington Stadium	4,000	1-2-1
6	October 20, 1946	Scranton Miners	14-14 T	Scranton Stadium	4,500	1-2-2
7	October 23, 1946	Bethlehem Bulldogs	27-20 L	Liberty High School Stadium	—	1-3-2
8	October 27, 1946	Akron Bears	31-0 L	Wilmington Stadium	5,000	1-4-2
9	October 31, 1946	Penn's Grove Red Devils	40-0 W	—	—	1-4-2
10	November 10, 1946	Jersey City Giants	32-0 L	Wilmington Stadium	3,000	1-5-2
11	November 17, 1946	Akron Bears	20-0 L	Rubber Bowl	—	1-6-2
12	November 24, 1946	Bethlehem Bulldogs	Cancelled	Wilmington Stadium	—	1-6-2
13	December 1, 1946	Long Island Indians	14-13 L	Wilmington Stadium	—	1-7-2
