= Bill Anderson (American football, born 1921) =

American football player (1921–1984)

No. 26, 20
- Position: End

Personal information
- Born: January 26, 1921; Wheeling, West Virginia, U.S.
- Died: April 1984 (aged 63); West Virginia, U.S.
- Listed height: 6 ft 2 in (1.88 m)
- Listed weight: 190 lb (86 kg)

Career information
- High school: Triadelphia (WV)
- College: West Virginia
- NFL draft: 1944: undrafted

Career history
- Yanks (1945); Wilmington Clippers (1946–1947)

Career NFL statistics
- Games played: 6
- Stats at Pro Football Reference

William Heatherington Anderson (January 26, 1921 – April 1984) was an American professional football player who was an end for one season in the National Football League (NFL) with the Yanks. He played college football for the West Virginia Mountaineers.

Anderson was born on January 26, 1921, in Wheeling, West Virginia. He attended Triadelphia High School there before playing college football at the University of West Virginia. He was a letterman in 1943 before being drafted to serve in World War II.

Anderson was not selected in an NFL draft, but was signed by the "Yanks", a merger between the Brooklyn Tigers and Boston Yanks, in 1945. As a Yank he appeared in between five and six games, playing on offense and defense at the end position.

In 1946, he was signed by the Wilmington Clippers in the minor American Football League (AFL). Though sought by the Yanks, he decided to stay with Wilmington. As a right end during the 1946 season, he appeared in nine out of ten games, and was a starter in eight. As a receiver, he caught ten passes for 247 yards, a 24.7 average.

Anderson returned to the Clippers for the 1947 season, and compiled 166 receiving yards on eleven receptions, an average of 15.1 yards per catch. He also scored his only career touchdown, as he appeared in seven out of eight games. He left the Clippers in 1948, and stopped playing football professionally.

Anderson later resided in Wheeling, West Virginia. He died in West Virginia in April 1984, at the age of 63.
