= John Tosi =

American football player (1913–2002)

No. 64, 26, 3, 48, 53
- Position: Offensive lineman

Personal information
- Born: December 3, 1913; Wilmington, Delaware, U.S.
- Died: November 24, 2002 (aged 88); Wilmington, Delaware, U.S.
- Listed height: 5 ft 10 in (1.78 m)
- Listed weight: 225 lb (102 kg)

Career information
- High school: Salesianum School (Wilmington)
- College: Fordham; Niagara
- NFL draft: 1939: 15th round, 132nd overall pick

Career history
- Eleventh Ward Whitejackets (c. 1931–1933); Pittsburgh Pirates (1939); Brooklyn Dodgers (1939); Paterson Panthers (1939); Wilmington Clippers (1939–1940); Roanoke Travelers (1941); Wilmington Clippers (1942); Philadelphia Eagles (1944); Wilmington Clippers (1946)

Awards and highlights
- Delaware Sports Museum and Hall of Fame (1982); Niagara University Sports Hall of Fame; Southside Athletic Hall of Fame (1993)

Career NFL statistics
- Games played: 4–5
- Games started: 2
- Stats at Pro Football Reference

John Joseph Tosi Sr. (December 3, 1913 – November 24, 2002) was an American professional football player who was an offensive lineman for two seasons in the National Football League (NFL) and several for different minor leagues.

Born in Wilmington, Delaware, Tosi attended Salesianum School, playing football there on Saturdays and for the minor league Eleventh Ward Whitejackets on Sundays. He accepted a scholarship offer from Fordham following his high school career. Tosi played one season at Fordham, before being brought by a coach to Niagara University. After three seasons there, he was selected in the 15th round of the 1939 NFL draft by the Pittsburgh Pirates. He played two games as a Pirate before being traded to the Brooklyn Dodgers. He started one game in Brooklyn before being released; he spent the following four seasons in minor leagues, retiring in 1943. He unretired in 1944 and joined the Philadelphia Eagles, appearing in one game. He retired again in 1945, made a return in 1946, and then retired a final time.

== Early life and education ==
Tosi was born on December 3, 1913, in Wilmington, Delaware, to Antonio and Antonetta Tosi. He attended high school at Salesianum School in Wilmington. He would play high school football on Saturdays, then join teammate Ed Michaels to play for the Eleventh Ward Whitejackets, of the minor Wilmington Football Association, on Sundays. The Whitejackets won three consecutive league titles from 1931 to 1933. Under coach Johnny Oakes with Salesianum, Tosi earned All-Catholic and All-Philadelphia honors. (Note: Salesianum played in the Philadelphia Catholic League.) He was offered many scholarships after graduating high school, including from Notre Dame. Tosi said, "I flew out to Notre Dame to discuss a football scholarship the school offered. They offered me a full scholarship, but I would still have to pay $150 a year. That was a lot of money and it was Depression time. My father was working only one day a week and had $1.50 in his pocket. There was no way I could come up with $150 a year to attend Notre Dame." Instead of taking Notre Dame's offer, he accepted a scholarship from Fordham. He spent just one year at Fordham, playing guard alongside future Pro Football Hall of Famer Vince Lombardi. When the coach at Fordham left and joined Niagara University, he took 15 players along with him, including Tosi. He played three seasons at Niagara, earning All-Catholic and All-East honors while playing center and linebacker. He also was named Little All-American.

== Professional career ==
After his career at Niagara, he was selected in the 15th round (132nd overall) of the 1939 NFL draft by the Pittsburgh Pirates. He became the first Niagara player ever to be selected in the draft and one of just eight Niagara attendees to participate professionally. He was assigned number 64 with the Pirates, and made one start in three games with them. Tosi was sold to the Brooklyn Dodgers shortly before the Pirates' game against the Washington Redskins, after making just three appearances. Given $175 per game, Tosi made one appearance with Brooklyn, starting at center during their game against the Philadelphia Eagles before being released along with Beattie Feathers two days later. He also played for two teams in minor leagues that year, making one appearance for the Paterson Panthers before going to the local Wilmington Clippers. He appeared in four games with the Clippers, starting two. He was on their 1940 roster but did not play. In 1941, he played for the Roanoke Travelers of the Dixie League before returning to Wilmington in 1942. Tosi then retired, but in 1944, high school teammate Ed Michaels convinced him to make a return to football. He did, playing alongside Michaels as a guard for the Philadelphia Eagles. He was paid $375 per game under coach Greasy Neale, the most Tosi earned in his career. He played in just one game with the Eagles. After not playing in 1945, he made one last return to the Clippers in 1946 and then retired for good.

== Later life ==
Following his football career, Tosi worked for 30 years at Sun Oil Company in Marcus Hook, Pennsylvania. He retired in 1961 but later took a job with NKS Beer Distributors in Wilmington. He retired around 1986.

He had four sons and one daughter. Three of his sons played football, with Mike playing at Columbia University, Jim playing at West Chester University, and John Jr. playing at Princeton University.

He was inducted into the Delaware Sports Museum and Hall of Fame in 1982, the Southside Athletic Hall of Fame in 1993, and the Niagara University Sports Hall of Fame at some point.

Tosi died on November 24, 2002, in his hometown, Wilmington, Delaware. He was 88 and died after a short illness.
