= George Sirochman =

American football player (1918–1996)

- Sirochman, c. 1942

No. 20, 52
- Position: Guard

Personal information
- Born: March 13, 1918; La Belle, Pennsylvania, U.S.
- Died: January 2, 1996 (aged 77); Washington, Pennsylvania, U.S.
- Listed height: 6 ft 2 in (1.88 m)
- Listed weight: 215 lb (98 kg)

Career information
- High school: Centerville PA
- College: Duquesne

Career history
- Pittsburgh Steelers (1942); Detroit Lions (1944); Wilmington Clippers (1947)

Career statistics
- Games: 11
- Stats at Pro Football Reference

George Sirochman Jr. (March 13, 1918 – January 2, 1996) was an American football player. He was sometimes known by the nickname "Blondy" Sirochman.

Sirochman was born in La Belle, Pennsylvania, and attended Former Centerville High School in Pennsylvania. He then played college football for Duquesne from 1939 to 1941. He was a starter at guard for the undefeated 1941 Duquesne team.

Sirochman also played professional football in the National Football League (NFL) as a guard for the Pittsburgh Steelers in 1942 and Detroit Lions in 1944. He appeared in 11 NFL games, one as a starter. He also played eight games (three as a starter) for the Wilmington Clippers of the American Football League (AFL) during their 1947 season.

Sirochman died in 1996 in Washington, Pennsylvania.
