= Johnny Kusko =

American football player (1914–1974)

- Kusko at Temple

No. 16, 36
- Position: Back

Personal information
- Born: March 27, 1914; Nesquehoning, Pennsylvania, U.S.
- Died: July 6, 1974 (aged 60); Lehighton, Pennsylvania, U.S.
- Listed height: 5 ft 11 in (1.80 m)
- Listed weight: 194 lb (88 kg)

Career information
- High school: Nesquehoning
- College: Temple (1933–1935)
- NFL draft: 1936: undrafted

Career history
- Philadelphia Eagles (1936–1938); Wilmington Clippers (1939)

Career NFL statistics
- Rushing yards: 236
- Touchdowns: 1
- Stats at Pro Football Reference

John Kusko (March 27, 1914 – July 6, 1974) was an American football player. A back, he played college football for the Temple Owls, where he spent several seasons as a backup before becoming their leading rusher as a senior in 1935. After college, Kusko played professionally for the Philadelphia Eagles of the National Football League (NFL) from 1936 to 1938 and for the Wilmington Clippers of the American Association (AA) in 1939.

== Early life ==
John Kusko was born on March 27, 1914, in Nesquehoning, Pennsylvania, where he grew up. He attended Nesquehoning High School, where he competed in football and basketball. Kusko was also a boxer, being classified as a heavyweight while weighing over 200 pounds (91 kg). He claimed the championships of Lackawanna and Luzerne counties. After graduating from high school in 1932, Kusko decided to enroll at Western Maryland College.

== College career ==
After starting at Western Maryland in 1932, Kusko then attended Temple University from 1933 to 1935. In his first two years, the Temple Owls compiled records of 5–3 and 7–1–2, with a Sugar Bowl appearance in the latter season. Playing under coach Pop Warner, Kusko was a backup fullback to David Smukler and saw little action most of his time at Temple.

Kusko entered the 1935 season, his senior year, as a backup, before later serving time as the starter after Smukler was injured. He broke out after the promotion and ended up being Temple's leading rusher for the season. In an upset win over Marquette, Kusko ran for 137 yards and a touchdown while also throwing a touchdown, a performance that earned the praise of Warner and local newspapers, one of which commented that he "wasn't merely good ... he was PERFECT". He helped the 1935 Owls to an overall record of 7–3. Kusko finished the season with 137 rush attempts for 524 yards, averaging 3.7 yards per carry while scoring two touchdowns and two extra points. The Pottsville Republican noted that he "shone in kicking, passing and ball carrying" and earned national attention for his performance. However, he left Temple in February 1936, in part due to a dispute with a professor.

== Professional career ==
Kusko joined the Philadelphia Eagles of the National Football League (NFL) in August 1936. He made the team and was one of their primary backs during the 1936 season, running the ball in 10 of 12 games and seeing action as a passer in eight games. He appeared in all 12 games, one as a starter, and was fourth on the team in rushing with 49 rush attempts for 209 yards and a touchdown, a 4.3 average per carry. His touchdown, a 70-yard run in a loss to the Chicago Bears, was one of only two rushing touchdowns scored by the Eagles all season. Kusko was also the team's second-leading passer. However, he completed only 6 of 27 pass attempts for 108 yards while throwing no touchdowns and nine interceptions; the Eagles as a whole only completed 39 passes and threw 3 touchdowns to 36 interceptions during the season, en route to a final record of 1–11.

Kusko returned to the Eagles in 1937 but saw less action as a runner and passer. He appeared in 10 games, four as a starter, but only ran 17 times for 27 yards while completing two of seven pass attempts for 11 yards and two interceptions; he also caught two passes for 47 yards. The 1937 Eagles compiled a record of 2–8–1. He only appeared in one game for the Eagles in 1938. Kusko had an offer to return to the Eagles in 1939, but declined as it would have interfered with a job he held. In August 1939, he signed with the Wilmington Clippers of the American Association (AA) on a contract that allowed him to also retain his job. Appearing in 12 games, five as a starter, he threw for four touchdowns and kicked three extra points while the Clippers went 9–3–1. Kusko did not return to the team in 1940.

During his career, Kusko was described by Eddie Michaels as someone who "can smack a line, he's a fine blocker, and one of the best punters in pro football". He concluded his NFL career with 66 carries for 236 yards and a touchdown while completing eight of 34 passes for 119 yards, no touchdowns, and 11 interceptions.

Kusko also played baseball for local teams. He stayed active in local sports after his professional football career and was a golfer.

== Personal life ==
Kusko married Josephine Greenamoyer in May 1936 and had two daughters with her. He worked for a time as a miner and later as a welder in Bethlehem, Pennsylvania. He died in Lehighton, Pennsylvania, on July 6, 1974, at the age of 60.
