= Bob Hainlen =

American football player (1926–2024)

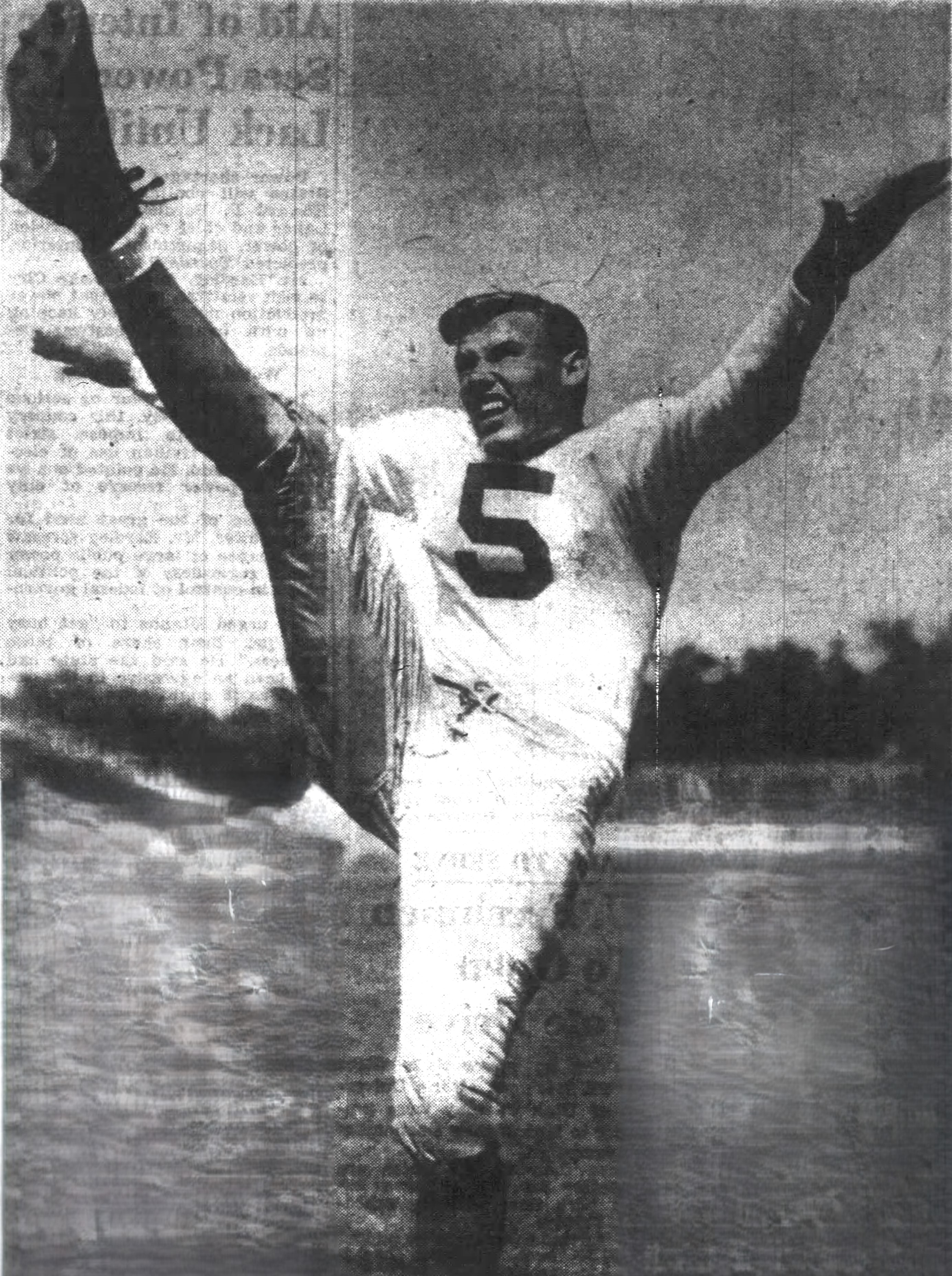
- Hainlen kicking for Colorado A&M in 1948

No. 6
- Position: Quarterback

Personal information
- Born: December 18, 1926; Trinidad, Colorado, U.S.
- Died: December 5, 2024 (aged 97); Scottsdale, Arizona, U.S.
- Listed height: 6 ft 2 in (1.88 m)
- Listed weight: 175 lb (79 kg)

Career information
- High school: Trinidad
- College: Colorado A&M (1945–1948)
- NFL draft: 1949: 19th round, 188th overall pick

Career history

Playing
- Washington Redskins (1949)*; Wilmington Clippers (1949)
- * Offseason or practice squad member only

Coaching
- Wilmington Clippers (1949) Assistant head coach

Awards and highlights
- Second-team All-Mountain States Conference (1948)

Career AFL statistics
- Games played: 9
- Games started: 9
- Pass attempts: 137
- Pass completions: 48
- Passing yards: 564
- Passing touchdowns: 5

Robert Frederick Hainlen (December 18, 1926 – December 5, 2024) was an American professional football player who was a quarterback in the National Football League (NFL). He played college football for the Colorado A&M Aggies (now Colorado State Rams). At 17 years old, he became the youngest starting quarterback in school history, and went on to be one of the only people in college football history to start every game from the beginning of their true freshman year throughout the rest of their eligibility. He was a second-team All-Mountain States Conference selection in 1948. Hainlen was selected in the 19th round of the 1949 NFL draft by the Washington Redskins. He later played a season with their farm team, the Wilmington Clippers, in 1949, before ending his professional career prior to the 1950 season.

== Early life and education ==
Robert Frederick Hainlen was born on December 18, 1926, in Trinidad, Colorado. He attended Trinidad High School and participated in football, basketball and track, winning 10 varsity letters. In track, he competed in the high jump. He enrolled at the Colorado State College of Agriculture and Mechanic Arts – Colorado A&M (now known as Colorado State University) – in 1945.

Hainlen immediately became the starting quarterback and started at the position in the first game of his true freshman season; at 17 years old, he became the youngest starting quarterback in school history, and Hainlen went on to be one of the only people in college football history to start every game from the beginning of their true freshman year throughout the rest of their eligibility. The Deseret News noted that "Bob is but 17 years of age, but it didn't take him long to prove that he is one of the smartest ball players seen around the Colorado Aggie field in several seasons. A triple-threater, he handles passing assignments, and play-calling like a master, and is a wizard at quick-kicking."

Hainlen won his first game against the Colorado State–Greeley Bears (now the Northern Colorado Bears) by a score of 33–0, serving in addition to quarterback as Colorado A&M's placekicker and punter. Four games into the season, Utah Utes coach Ike Armstrong declared Hainlen to be the best passer in the Mountain States Conference (MSC). The team ended the season with a record of 2–5–1.

Hainlen remained starter in 1946 and despite the team compiling a record of 2–7, he was called "the region's best passer" and was named an honorable mention all-conference selection at the end of the year. He had become "probably the best kicker in the Rocky [M]ountain region" and "one of the top kickers in the nation" by 1947 and was averaging over 48 yards-per-punt early in the season, a number more than three yards higher than that recorded by whom the National Collegiate Athletic Bureau (NCAB) listed as the national leader (Hainlen did not qualify for the list due to not having enough punts). He led Colorado A&M to a 5–4–1 record in 1947 and finished as their leading passer and punter, with 468 passing yards on 34 completions and 56 punts for 1,876 yards.

As a senior at Colorado A&M in 1948, Hainlen led the team, who had been projected to finish no higher than fourth (out of six) in the conference, to a record of 8–3 and a second place finish, with only one inter-conference loss to champion Utah. He was noted as having been a key player in several of the wins, including kicking a game-winning field goal to "stun" undefeated Utah State 9–7, having "his greatest football performance" in a 21–20 win against undefeated Wyoming, and a one-score win over rival Colorado where Hainlen kicked three field goals in what was the margin of victory. He described the Colorado game in 1949 as his favorite, having made all three field goal attempts including a 40-yarder that was the sixth longest in the nation that year. Hainlen ended his collegiate career with a one-point loss to the Occidental Tigers in the 1949 Raisin Bowl, in what was the team's first-ever postseason appearance. That year, he totaled six fields goals made on 10 attempts as a senior, tying for what was then the national record for field goals made in a season. Hainlen was selected second-team all-conference at the end of the season, with the International News Service (INS) noting that he gave Cannon Parkinson a "run for the spot" on the first team. He was ruled ineligible to play in the 1949 season after eligibility issues due to World War II were "ironed out".

Despite his ability in kicking field goals, Hainlen noted in a 1949 interview with Al Cartwright that he was unable to kick shorter extra points. "I know it sounds silly, but I never could learn to droop over those extra-point kicks. The longer the better for me. It's just one of those things, like putting in golf", he said. In addition to playing football, Hainlen also competed in basketball and baseball, being a shortstop in the latter and batting .369 as a senior. Colorado A&M coach Julius Wagner called Hainlen "the greatest all-around athlete I've ever seen", further elaborating:

Last spring, Bob walked across the field where the boys were holding an intramural track meet. Bob hadn't been out for track at all; he was a member of the Aggie baseball team. But he put down his glove and entered the high jump. He won, and he wasn't even out for track! He's a star baseball player and a good football and basketball athlete. [...] But, here's something else: Bob could pick up a set of clubs and beat the university golf champ, and he could take a racket and play a good match with the school's best tennis player.

== Professional career and later life ==
Hainlen was selected by the Washington Redskins in the 19th round, with the 188th overall pick, of the 1949 NFL draft. He signed his contract on c. June 22, 1949. He spent seven weeks at the Redskins training camp but was part of a crowded quarterback room that included all-time great Sammy Baugh, Pro Bowler Harry Gilmer, and Tommy Mont. He was sent to the Redskins' farm team, the Wilmington Clippers of the American Football League (AFL), after not making the final roster. Although one of the youngest players on the team, he was named assistant coach to Doug Turley upon joining the Clippers. He was named starting quarterback for the team and appeared in and started all but one of their games, helping them compile a record of 5–5 while reaching the playoffs. The Clippers lost to the Richmond Rebels in the first round of the playoffs and the team folded soon after. Statistically, Hainlen completed 48-of-137 pass attempts for 564 yards and five touchdown passes to 10 interceptions. He also ran for two touchdowns and had 44 punts with a 37.8 yard average. He requested to be released by Washington on c. June 2, 1950, and returned to his studies in physical education at Colorado A&M, graduating later that year.

Hainlen married Dorayne Stone of Denver on July 23, 1949. They had four children together; Dorayne died in 2010. Hainlen died on December 5, 2024, at the age of 97.
