= Reid Lennan =

American football player (1920–1979)

No. 51
- Position: Lineman

Personal information
- Born: August 17, 1920; Baltimore, Maryland, U.S.
- Died: February 1979 (age 58)

Career information
- College: none

Career history
- 1945: Washington Redskins
- 1946: Wilmington Clippers
- 1947: Los Angeles Dons
- 1949: Wilmington Clippers

Reid Burgess Lennan, sometimes known as Lennon (August 17, 1920 – February 1979) was an American football lineman in the National Football League (NFL) for the Washington Redskins. He also played in the All-America Football Conference (AAFC) for the Los Angeles Dons and with the Wilmington Clippers of the American Football League (AFL). He appeared in a total of 10 games in the NFL, seven in the AAFC (two of which he started), and 13 in the AFL (nine of which he started), for a total of 30 professional matches.
