= Vannie Albanese =

American football player (1912–1984)

No. 54
- Positions: Linebacker, running back, cornerback

Personal information
- Born: December 2, 1912; Syracuse, New York, U.S.
- Died: September 2, 1984 (aged 71); Canandaigua, New York, U.S.
- Listed height: 6 ft 0 in (1.83 m)
- Listed weight: 184 lb (83 kg)

Career information
- High school: Manlius (NY)
- College: Syracuse

Career history
- Brooklyn Dodgers (1937–1938); Paterson Panthers (1938–1939); Union City Rams (1939); New York Yankees (1940)

Awards and highlights
- First-team All-Eastern (1935)

Career NFL statistics
- Games played: 18
- Rush attempts: 48
- Rushing yards: 150
- Stats at Pro Football Reference

Vincent Michelo Albanese (December 2, 1912 – September 2, 1984) was an American professional football player who played two seasons for the Brooklyn Dodgers in 1937 and 1938. He also played in the American Association (AA) for the Paterson Panthers and Union City Rams. He was a team captain at Syracuse.
