= Sig Andrusking =

American football player (1913–1994)

No. 18, 23, 33, 34, 51, 27
- Position: Guard

Personal information
- Born: January 18, 1913; Erie, Pennsylvania, U.S.
- Died: August 17, 1994 (aged 81); St. Louis, Missouri, U.S.
- Listed height: 5 ft 8 in (1.73 m)
- Listed weight: 187 lb (85 kg)

Career information
- High school: East (Erie, Pennsylvania)
- College: Detroit (1932–1935)
- NFL draft: 1936: undrafted

Career history
- Detroit Lions (1936)*; Cleveland Rams (1936); Brooklyn Dodgers (1937); New York Yankees (1937); Wilmington Clippers (1938–1941, 1946)
- * Offseason or practice squad member only
- Stats at Pro Football Reference

Sigmond Francis "Ziggy" Andrusking (January 18, 1913 – August 17, 1994) was an American professional football guard who played one season with the Brooklyn Dodgers of the National Football League (NFL). He played college football at the University of Detroit.

== Early life and college ==
Sigmond Francis Andrusking was born on January 18, 1913, in Erie, Pennsylvania. He attended East High School in Erie and graduated in 1932.

Andrusking was a member of the Detroit Titans of the University of Detroit from 1932 from 1935 and a three-year letterman from 1933 to 1935.

== Professional career ==
Andrusking signed with the Detroit Lions in 1936 after going undrafted in the 1936 NFL draft. On September 23, 1936, it was reported that Andrusking had been cut by the Lions and ordered to report to the Lions' farm team in Springfield, Ohio.

Andrusking then signed with the Cleveland Rams of the American Football League (AFL). He played in all nine games, starting seven, during the team's inaugural 1936 season as the Rams went 5–2–2.

Andrusking was signed by the Brooklyn Dodgers of the National Football League in 1937. He appeared in seven games, starting one, for the Dodgers that year before being released.

Andrusking then signed with New York Yankees of the AFL and played in one game for them during the 1937 season.

Andrusking appeared in ten games, starting three, for the independent Wilmington Clippers in 1938. In 1939, the Clippers joined the American Association. Andrusking started all 13 games for Wilmington during the 1939 season as the team finished with a 9–3–1 record. He started all ten games for the Clippers in 1940 as well and the team went 5–4–1. On December 15, 1940, the Clippers lost in the league title game to the Jersey Giants. Andrusking then served in the United States Army during World War II. He was relieved from duty in early December 1941 and then started two games for the Clippers during the 1941 season, before being called back to the Army. After his stint in the Army ended, he returned to the Clippers in 1946 and played in three games that year. He left the team in October 1946, later stating that he "couldn't do anything. I was rusty and too old."

== Personal life ==
Andrusking had a 27-year career as a freight conductor before retiring in the 1970s. In 1983, it was reported that Andrusking had been living in the same apartment in Wilmington since 1945. He died on August 17, 1994, in St. Louis, Missouri.
