= Vince Zizak =

American football player and wrestler (1908–1973)

No. 23
- Positions: Offensive tackle, Offensive Guard

Personal information
- Born: August 8, 1908; Camden, New Jersey, U.S.
- Died: August 1973 (aged 64–65)
- Listed height: 5 ft 8 in (1.73 m)
- Listed weight: 208 lb (94 kg)

Career information
- High school: La Salle Prep (PA)
- College: Villanova

Career history
- Chicago Bears (1934); Philadelphia Eagles (1934-1937); Rochester Tigers (1937); Wilmington Clippers (1938)

Career statistics
- Games played: 24
- Games started: 6
- Stats at Pro Football Reference

Vincent Augustine Zizak (August 8, 1908 – August 1973) was an American football offensive guard and professional wrestler. He played in the National Football League (NFL) for the Chicago Bears and Philadelphia Eagles across four seasons.

== Early life ==
Vince Zizak was born on August 8, 1908, in Camden, New Jersey.

== Football career ==
Vince Zizak played two games for the Chicago Bears before joining the Philadelphia Eagles. Zizak then played four seasons with the team, but only played 22 games. He also started six. In 1937, he played two games with the Eagles before joining the Rochester Tigers of the AFL II. Then, in 1938 he played for the Wilmington Clippers of the American Association.

== Wrestling career ==
Zizak briefly was a professional wrestler in the winter of 1936.
