= Frank Coker =

American football player (1911–1991)

No. 33, 44, 58
- Position: Center

Personal information
- Born: March 18, 1911; San Angelo, Texas, U.S.
- Died: September 11, 1991 (aged 80); Texas, U.S.
- Listed height: 6 ft 3 in (1.91 m)
- Listed weight: 225 lb (102 kg)

Career information
- College: Daniel Baker

Career history
- Philadelphia Eagles (1937–1938)*; Wilmington Clippers (1937–1940)
- * Offseason or practice squad member only

Awards and highlights
- 2× All-AA (1939, 1940)
- Military career
- Burial place: Paint Rock Cemetery
- Allegiance: Texas National Guard (1940); United States Army (1941–?)
- Service years: 1940–?
- Rank: Major
- Nickname: "Tex"
- Conflicts: World War II; Invasion of Italy
- Awards: Purple Heart; Oak leaf clusters (2)

Frank Claud "Tex" Coker (March 18, 1911 – September 11, 1991) was an American football center. He played four seasons for the Wilmington Clippers of the American Association (AA).

== Early life and education ==
Frank Coker was born on March 18, 1911, in San Angelo, Texas. He played college football at Daniel Baker College. He was there from 1933 to 1936 before playing professionally.

== Professional career ==
Coker was first signed as an undrafted free agent by the Philadelphia Eagles following the 1937 NFL draft. He did not make the roster and was then sent to their new farm team, the Wilmington Clippers. In his first season with the Clippers, he played and started all 11 games at the center position. He also started every game in 1938 as well. He changed his number from 33 to 44 in 1939 as the Clippers joined the American Association. He played in 13 games in '39, starting 10, and was named All-AA. He started 9 games in 1940 before being called to the Texas National Guard and later the United States Army in World War II. He was the first Clipper called to service.

== Military career ==
In 1941, he was called to the United States Army in World War II. He was seriously injured after the Invasion of Italy and was then awarded the Purple Heart and two Oak leaf clusters. He achieved the rank of Major in 1945.

== Death ==
Coker died on September 11, 1991, at the age of 80 in Texas. He was buried at Paint Rock Cemetery.
