= 1935 All-Eastern football team =

American all-star college football team

The 1935 All-Eastern football team consists of American football players chosen by various selectors as the best players at each position among the Eastern colleges and universities during the 1935 college football season.

== All-Eastern selections ==
=== Quarterbacks ===
- Ken Sandbach, Princeton (AP-1, INS-1, NEA-1)
- Franny Murray, Penn (AP-2)

=== Halfbacks ===
- Monk Meyer, Army (AP-1, INS-1)
- Hubert Randour, Pittsburgh (INS-2, NEA-1, PW)
- Ed Smith, NYU (INS-2, NEA-1, PW [fb])
- Tuffy Leemans, George Washington (INS-1, PW [qb])
- J. Sneed Schmidt, Navy (AP-1)
- Nicholas Morris, Holy Cross (PW)
- John White, Princeton (AP-2)
- Robert LaRue, Pittsburgh (AP-2)
- Patrick, Pittsburgh (INS-2)
- Don Irwin, Colgate (INS-2)

=== Fullbacks ===
- Vannie Albanese, Syracuse (AP-1, INS-1)
- Joe Maniaci, Fordham (NEA-1)
- Kimball Whitehead, Yale (AP-2)

=== Ends ===
- William R. Shuler, Army (AP-1, INS-2, NEA-1)
- Bob Train, Yale (AP-2, INS-1, NEA-1, PW)
- Walter Winika, Rutgers (AP-1)
- Gilbert Lea, Princeton (AP-2, INS-1, PW)
- Bob Daughters, Holy Cross (INS-2)

=== Tackles ===
- Charles Wasicek, Colgate (AP-1, INS-1, NEA-1, PW)
- Ed Michaels, Villanova (AP-1, INS-2, NEA-1, PW)
- Joe Stydahar, West Virginia (AP-2, INS-2, NEA-1)
- Moody Sarno, Fordham (INS-1, PW)
- Charles Toll, Princeton (AP-2, INS-2)

=== Guards ===
- Jac Weller, Princeton (AP-1, INS-1)
- Phil Flanagan, Holy Cross (AP-1)
- Edward A. Jontos, Syracuse (INS-1)
- James Gaffney, Harvard (NEA-1)
- Bill Montgomery, Princeton (PW)
- Ed Franco, Fordham (AP-2)
- Latta McCray, Dartmouth (AP-2)
- Gene Gisburne, Princeton (INS-2)

=== Centers ===
- Stephen Cullinan, Princeton (AP-1)
- Louis Robertshaw, Navy (AP-2, INS-1, PW)
- Carl Ray, Dartmouth (INS-2, NEA-1)

== Key ==
- AP = Associated Press
- UP = United Press
- INS = International News Service
- NEA = Newspaper Enterprise Association
- PW = Pop Warner

== See also ==
- 1935 College Football All-America Team
