= Phil Flanagan (American football) =

American football player (1909–1987)

Profile
- Position: Guard

Personal information
- Born: December 15, 1909; Clinton, Massachusetts, U.S.
- Died: October 7, 1987 (aged 77); Northampton, Massachusetts, U.S.
- Listed height: 5 ft 8 in (1.73 m)
- Listed weight: 220 lb (100 kg)

Career information
- High school: Clinton (MA)
- College: Holy Cross
- NFL draft: 1936: 9th round, 81st overall pick

Career history
- New York Giants (1936)*; Boston Shamrocks (1936)
- * Offseason or practice squad member only

Awards and highlights
- Third-team All-American (1935); First-team All-Eastern (1935); Holy Cross Athletics Hall of Fame (1974)

Philip Francis Flanagan (December 15, 1909 – October 7, 1987) was an American football guard. He was the 81st and last selection in the 1936 NFL draft, making him the first Mr. Irrelevant.

== Early life ==
Flanagan was born on December 15, 1909, in Clinton, Massachusetts.

He attended high school at Clinton High School before playing college football at Holy Cross.

=== College career ===
Flanagan spent 1932 to 1935 at Holy Cross, playing from 1933 to 1935.

==== Injury ====
In summer of 1935, Flanagan had an infected tooth that infected a gland. He was hospitalized for six weeks, being told that his football career was over. The Worcester Telegram said that he "returned to college and surprised everyone by reporting for the football team." It also stated that "At the time of his return to college Flanagan was scarcely able to open his mouth and was forced to live on liquids for some time."

==== Post-Injury ====
He later played well enough to be named the team's starting guard, and was named to the College Football All-America Team following the 1935 season. He also earned a position on the college football all-East team. He would later then be inducted into the Holy Cross Athletics Hall of Fame in 1974.

== Professional career ==
Flanagan was the final selection inaugural 1936 NFL draft by the New York Giants. He was selected in the ninth round with the 81st overall pick. However, instead of playing with the Giants, he decided to join the Boston Shamrocks of the American Football League (AFL). With Boston he appeared in two games. It would be the only games of his career.

Year	GP	GS
1936	2	0

== Death ==
Flanagan died on October 7, 1987, in Northampton, Massachusetts, at the age of 77.
