= Walter Winika =

American football player and naval aviator (1912–1942)

Rutgers Scarlet Knights
- Position: End

Personal information
- Born: March 13, 1912; Brooklyn, New York, U.S.
- Died: July 12, 1942 (aged 30); Trinidad

Career information
- College: Rutgers (1935)

Awards and highlights
- Second-team All-American (1935); First-team All-Eastern (1935)

Walter Werner Winika (March 13, 1912 – July 12, 1942) was an American football player and naval aviator. He played at the end position for Rutgers University and was selected as a second-team All-American in 1935.

== Football player ==
Born in Brooklyn, New York, Winika attended Manual Training High School. He entered Rutgers University in New Jersey in September 1931. He played for Rutgers varsity football team from 1933 to 1935 and was considered one of the best ends in the East during the 1930s. In 1933, Winika was the only player to score a touchdown against Fritz Crisler's undefeated 1933 national championship team at Princeton University. Winika caught a 45-yard pass for the touchdown in front of 40,000 fans at Princeton. He was selected by the Associated Press as a second-team All-American at the end position on the 1935 College Football All-America Team. He was selected as a member of the all-time All-Rutgers football team in 1940.

== Military service and death ==
Winika received a Bachelor of Science degree in education in June 1936. He enlisted in the U.S. Navy in May 1939 and received his commission as an ensign in July 1940 and as a lieutenant in December 1941. In July 1942, Winika was killed when the plane he piloted crashed while on patrol near Trinidad. Nine members of the crew were killed in the crash. Winika was the first varsity athlete from Rutgers to die in World War II. He was buried at Greenwood Cemetery in Brooklyn.

After Winika's death, members of his fraternity, Alpha Rho of Chi Psi fraternity, established the "Walter W. Winika 1936 Fund" using insurance funds and gifts from friends and classmates. The Winika Fund formed the basis of the Alpha Rho Memorial Foundation established in 1948.

== See also ==
- 1935 College Football All-America Team
