= Len McCormick =

American football player (1922–2012)

- Len "Tuffy" McCormick, 1948

No. 28
- Positions: Center, linebacker

Personal information
- Born: October 28, 1922; Eldorado, Texas
- Died: August 20, 2012 (aged 89); Eldorado, Texas
- Listed height: 6 ft 3 in (1.91 m)
- Listed weight: 232 lb (105 kg)

Career information
- High school: Eldorado (TX)
- College: Schreiner (1941); Baylor (1942); Southwestern (TX) (1943); Georgia Pre-Flight (1944); Baylor (1946)

Career history
- Wilmington Clippers (1947); Baltimore Colts (1948)

Career statistics
- Games: 11
- Stats at Pro Football Reference

Len Gardner "Tuffy" McCormick (October 28, 1922 – August 20, 2012) was an American football and basketball player, lawyer, rancher, and oilman. He played football at the center and linebacker positions for Baylor, the Wilmington Clippers, and Baltimore Colts.

== Early life ==
McCormick was born in 1922 in Eldorado, Texas. He grew up on a ranch and attended Eldorado High School. He attended Schreiner Military Institute (later renamed Schreiner University) and then enrolled for one year at Baylor University. He served in the U.S. Marine Corps during World War II from 1942 to 1945. He was assigned by the Marines to the V-12 Navy College Training Program at Southwestern University (Texas) and played football there in 1943. He also played center on the 1944 Georgia Pre-Flight Skycrackers football team.

After the war, he attended Baylor University, graduating in 1947. He also played college football as a center, linebacker, and placekicker for the Baylor Bears football team. He also played center for the Baylor Bears men's basketball team.

== Professional football ==
After graduating from Baylor, McCormick played professional football for the Wilmington Clippers of the American Football League in 1947 and for the Baltimore Colts of the All-America Football Conference (AAFC) during the 1948 season. He appeared in a total of 11 AAFC games, five as a starter, and intercepted one pass. He attended Baylor Law School while playing for the Colts.

== Later life ==
McCormick received his law degree from Baylor in 1950. During the Korean War, he served in the Judge Advocate General's Corps. After the war, he became a city attorney in Midland, Texas. He later established a private law practice and entered the oil business. He served as president of Santiago Oil and Gas, Santana Petroleum Company, and Gold Metal Consolidation Mining Company. In 1958, he purchased a 320,000-acre ranch that later became Big Bend Ranch State Park. He died in 2012 at age 89 in Eldorado, Texas.
