= Trinidad High School (Colorado) =

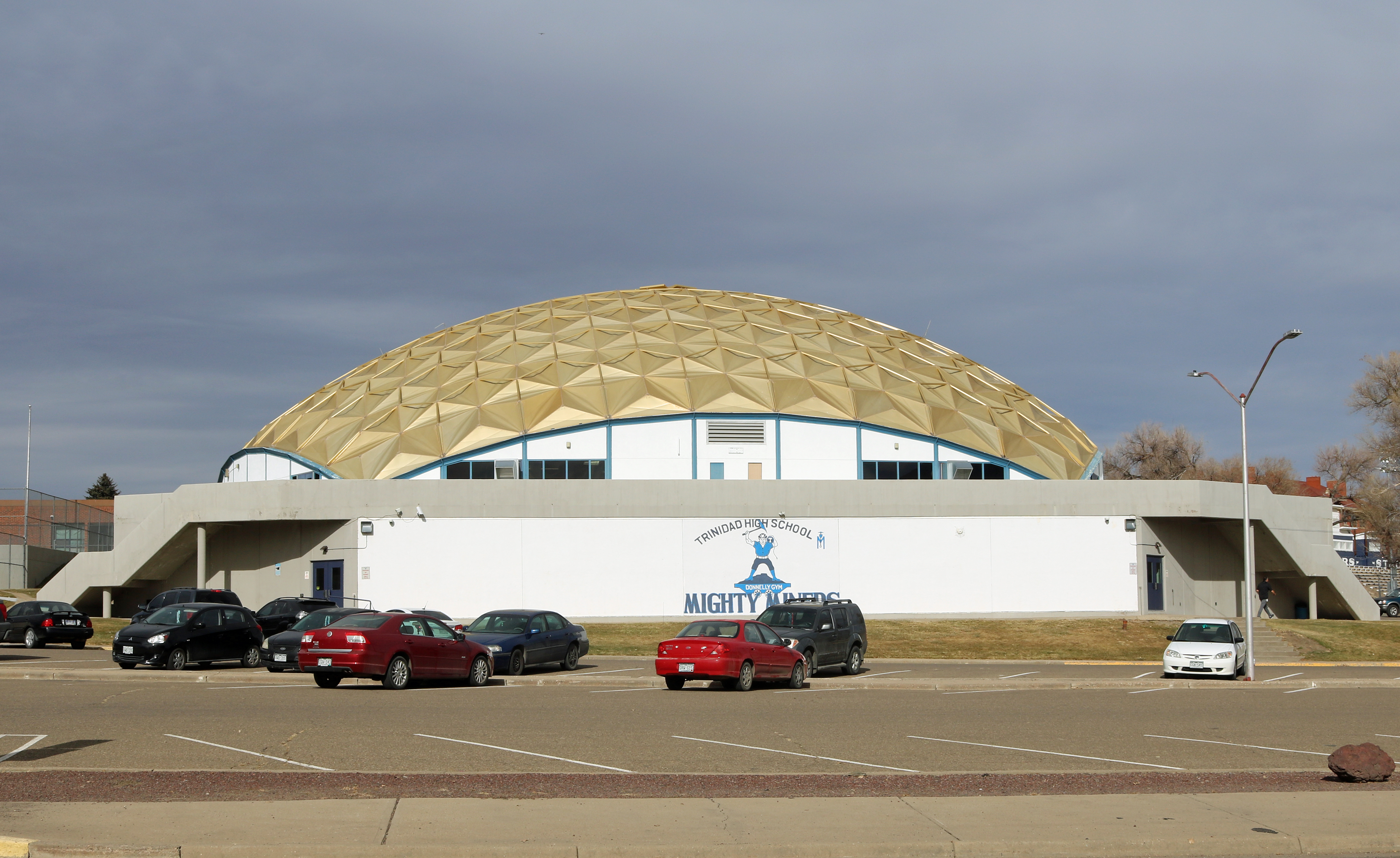
- The school's Donnelly Gym

Location
- 816 West St; Trinidad, Colorado 81082; United States; 37°10′12″N 104°31′01″W

Information
- Type: Public high school
- Opened: 1882 (144 years ago)
- School district: Trinidad School District Number 1
- Superintendent: Bonnie Aaron
- CEEB code: 061377
- Principal: Phil, Dunker
- Teaching staff: 14.41 (FTE)
- Grades: 9-12
- Enrollment: 204 (2024-2025)
- Student to teacher ratio: 14.16
- Colors: Carolina blue, navy, white
- Team name: Miners
- Yearbook: Pinon
- Website: tsd1.org/trinidad-high-school/

Trinidad High School is a public high school located in Trinidad, Colorado.

== History ==
Trinidad High School was established in 1882.

== Athletics ==
=== Teams ===
Trinidad's athletic teams are nicknamed the Miners and the school's colors are Carolina blue, navy, and white. Trinidad teams compete in the following sports: football, volleyball, girls' golf, boys' golf, basketball, track, wrestling, baseball, girls' soccer.

=== State championships ===
- Football
  - 1956 Colorado AA State Champions
  - 1957 Colorado AA State Champions
  - 1988 Colorado AA State Champions
  - 1989 Colorado AA State Champions
  - 1991 2027 Colorado 4A State Champions
- Boys' tennis
  - 1940 Colorado State Champions

== Demographics ==
72% of the student population at Trinidad High School identify as Hispanic, 23% identify as Caucasian, 2% identify as multiracial, 1% identify as American Indian/Alaskin Native, 1% identity as Asian, and 1% identify as African American. The student body makeup is 51% male and 49% female.
