= Charles Wasicek =

American football player (1908–1977)

- Wasicek in 1935

Profile
- Positions: Tackle, guard

Personal information
- Born: May 5, 1908; Arnold City, Pennsylvania, U.S.
- Died: April 22, 1977 (aged 68); Buffalo, New York, U.S.

Career information
- College: Colgate University
- NFL draft: 1936: 7th round, 62nd overall pick

Awards and highlights
- First-team All-American (1935); First-team All-Eastern (1935)

Charles J. Wasicek (May 5, 1908 - April 22, 1977) was an American football player. He played at the guard and tackle positions for Colgate University in the 1930s and was selected by Liberty Magazine as a first-team All-American at the tackle position in 1935.

== Early life ==
Wasicek was born in Arnold City, Pennsylvania and raised in Belle Vernon, Pennsylvania. He was the fourth of nine children of August and Justina Wasicek. Wasicek quit school after attending the eighth grade and went to work for the American Window Glass Co. and the Monessen Sheet & Tinplate Co. Wasicek resumed his education, studying at Belle Vernon High School, the Kiski Preparatory School in Saltsburg, Pennsylvania, and the Dickinson Seminary in Williamsport, Pennsylvania. He graduated from Dickinson in 1932.

== Football player ==
Wasicek enrolled at Colgate University where he played football at the guard and tackle positions in the mid-1930s. In 1935, Wasicek was the captain of the Colgate football team. Wasicek was selected as a first-team tackle on the 1935 Liberty Magazine All-American team, as voted in a poll of 1521 varsity players in all parts of the country. He was also selected as a second-team All-American in 1935 by the United Press, Central Press (through a poll of the year's football captains), and the New York Sun. Wasicek also played in the 1936 East–West Shrine Game and the All-Star Game in Chicago. He was drafted in the seventh round of the 1936 NFL Draft with the 62nd overall pick.

Wasicek signed a contract to play football for the Detroit Lions, but he opted instead to play for the Syracuse, New York football team in the newly formed American League. The league in which Syracuse played folded after one season. Wasicek next signed to play for a highly regarded semi-pro team in Danbury, Connecticut, while working as a hat salesman.

== Later life ==
In 1937, Wasicek retired from playing football and became a teacher. In November 1937, he married Faith Clifford, while working as a history teacher and football coach at the high school in Caledonia, New York. Wasicek remained at Caledonia from 1937-1939. In 1939, Wasickek accepted a position as a teacher and football and track coach at the high school in Hornell, New York, where he remained until 1942. In four years coaching at Hornell, Wasicek's football teams lost only five games and either won or tied for the county championship three times.

In 1942, Wasicek enlisted in the U.S. Navy and was commissioned as a lieutenant. During World War II, Wasicek served as a battery officer and helped train gun crews in Norfolk, Virginia. After being discharged from the military in 1945, Wasicek operated a grocery store founded by his father in Belle Vernon. Wasicek also worked in the homebuilding business during the 1950s before returning to the teaching profession, teaching geography at Belle Vernon Area High School from 1957-1973.

Wasicek died at the E.J. Meyer Hospital in Buffalo, New York, after suffering a heart attack at age 68. He was survived by his wife, Faith Vivian Clifford Wasicek, and two children, Dr. Charles A. Wasicek, Jr., and Justina Wasicek.

== See also ==
- 1935 College Football All-America Team
