= Jac Weller =

American football player

No. 99
- Position: Guard

Personal information
- Born: January 6, 1913; Atlanta, Georgia, U.S.
- Died: August 18, 1994 (aged 81); Princeton, New Jersey, U.S.
- Listed height: 6 ft 0 in (1.83 m)
- Listed weight: 195 lb (88 kg)

Career information
- High school: The Hun School
- College: Princeteon (1933–1935)

Awards and highlights
- Consensus All-American (1935); Second-team All-American (1934); First-team All-Eastern (1935)
- College Football Hall of Fame (Class of 1957)

John "Jac" Weller (January 6, 1913 – August 18, 1994) was an American college football player, firearms expert and military historian. He was a consensus All-American in 1935 at the guard position. He played for Fritz Crisler's Princeton Tigers football team at Princeton University that went 25–1 during Weller's three years on the team. Weller later became known as a firearms expert and published several works on munitions and military history.

== Football player at Princeton ==
Weller was born in Atlanta, Georgia and raised in Jacksonville, Florida. He attended preparatory school at The Hun School before enrolling at Princeton University. At Princeton, Weller was a star lineman for Fritz Crisler's Princeton Tigers football championship teams of the mid-1930s. Crisler began the practice of having players wear numbers on their jerseys while Weller was a student, and Crisler assigned the number 99 to his best player—Jack Weller. During Weller's three seasons at Princeton, the football team compiled a record of 25 wins against a single loss. The only loss was a 7–0 loss to rival Yale in 1934. In 1935, Princeton had a perfect record of 9–0, and Weller was recognized as a consensus All-American at the guard position. Weller later recalled, "We had one of the finest bunch of football players ever to come to Princeton...in four years, no major opponent ever scored more than one touchdown on us." He was drafted in the seventh round of the 1936 NFL Draft.

== Later life ==
After graduating, and marrying Cornelia Murray, Weller settled in Princeton, New Jersey, where he operated a real estate and insurance business. Weller maintained a lifelong interest in firearms and was an honorary curator of the West Point Museum in the 1960s. In 1962, he conducted new ballistics tests that established that Italian anarchist Nicola Sacco was guilty, and Bartolomeo Venzetti not guilty of the 1920 murders for which both were convicted. He was also the author of several books on military weapons and tactics. His published works include:

- Guns of Destiny: Field Artillery in the Trenton-Princeton Campaign,
- Nathan Bedford Forrest, A Redleg in Disguise,
- Revolutionary West Point,
- On Wellington: The Duke and His Art of War,
- Wellington in India
- Wellington in the Peninsula (1992).
- Wellington at Waterloo,
- Recollections of John Gale Hun,
- Good and Bad Weapons for Vietnam.

Weller was inducted into the College Football Hall of Fame in 1954. Weller was also one of the initial inductees into The Hun School's Athletic Hall of Fame.

Weller died in 1994 in Princeton at age 81 of a self-inflicted gunshot wound. He left his military books, photograph albums, notes, and offprints to the Anne S. K. Brown Military Collection at Brown University Library. His farm eventually became the basis for Barbara Smoyer Park in Princeton.
