= La Belle, Pennsylvania =

Unincorporated community in Pennsylvania, US

- Unincorporated community
- Location within Pennsylvania
- Coordinates: 40°00′28″N 79°58′44″W
- Country: United States
- State: Pennsylvania
- County: Fayette
- Elevation: 994 ft (303 m)
- Time zone: UTC-5 (Eastern (EST))
  - Summer (DST): UTC-4 (EDT)
- ZIP code: 15450
- Area codes: 724, 878
- GNIS feature ID: 1192726

La Belle is an unincorporated community in Fayette County, Pennsylvania, United States. The community is located along the Monongahela River, 5.1 miles (8.2 km) west of Brownsville. La Belle has a post office, with ZIP code 15450.
