= Ed Stacco =

American football player (1924–2007)

No. 52, 57
- Position: Tackle

Personal information
- Born: April 16, 1925; Carbondale, Pennsylvania, U.S.
- Died: April 6, 2007 (aged 81); Mansfield, Ohio, U.S.
- Listed height: 6 ft 2 in (1.88 m)
- Listed weight: 261 lb (118 kg)

Career information
- College: Colgate
- NFL draft: 1946: 25th round, 238th overall pick

Career history
- Detroit Lions (1947); Washington Redskins (1948)

Career NFL statistics
- Games played: 14
- Fumble recoveries: 2
- Stats at Pro Football Reference

Edward Adams Stacco (April 16, 1924 – April 6, 2007) was an American professional football offensive tackle in the National Football League (NFL) for the Detroit Lions and the Washington Redskins. He played college football at Colgate University and was drafted in the 25th round of the 1946 NFL draft. Stacco went on to play for the Washington Commanders in 1948.
