= Philip Haythornthwaite =

English historian (born 1951)

- Born: 1951 (age 74–75); Lancashire, England, UK
- Occupation: Historian
- Writing career
- Subjects: Military history speciality Napoleonic Wars

Philip J. Haythornthwaite FRHistS (born 1951) is an author and historical consultant specialising in military history, uniforms, and equipment. While his main area of research is the Napoleonic Wars, his list of publications covers a wider period from the English Civil War through to 1939.

== Works ==
Since 1973, Haythornthwaite has had over 80 books published, in addition to numerous articles and papers on military history. Much of this output through the publishers Orion Books and Osprey Publishing, is directed at the popular market. His works The Armies of Wellington and Redcoats, The British Soldiers of the Napoleonic Wars as well as Picton’s Division at Waterloo are works of research.

Other work includes Haythornthwaite preparation of new editions of several well-known Peninsular War memoirs: Life in Napoleon’s Army: the Memoirs of Captain Elzear Blaze In the Peninsula with a French Hussar: Memoirs of the War of the French in Spain.

== Awards ==
Haythornthwaite is a Fellow of the Royal Historical Society and a Member of the British Commission for Military History. In 2015 he was awarded a Certificate in Recognition of Lifetime Achievement jointly by the BCMH and the Peninsular War 200 organisation.

== Select bibliography ==
Orion Books

- World Uniforms + Battles 1815-50. London: Blandford Press. 1976. ISBN 0-71370-776-3.
- British Infantry of the Napoleonic Wars. London: Arms and Armour Press. 1987. ISBN 0-85368-890-7.
- The Armies of Wellington. London: Arms and Armour Press. 1994. ISBN 978-1-86019-849-6.
  The Armies of Wellington is the most comprehensive account ever published of the effect of this one man on the British Army during the Napoleonic era.
- Weapons & Equipment of the Napoleonic Wars. London: Arms and Armour Press. 1996. ISBN 1-85409-495-5.
- Napoleonic Infantry:Weapons and Warfare. London: Arms and Armour Press. 2001. ISBN 0304355097.

Osprey Publishing 35 titles between 1983 and 2016

- MAA 141 Napoleon's Line Infantry. London: Osprey Publishing. 1983. ISBN 978-0-85045-512-0.
- ELI 215 British Light Infantry & Rifle Tactics of the Napoleonic Wars. London: Osprey Publishing. 2016. ISBN 978-1-4728-1606-1.

Pen & Sword Books

- In the Words of Napoleon. London: Pen & Sword. 2002. ISBN 978-1-85367-483-9.
- Redcoats: The British Soldiers of the Napoleonic Wars. London: Pen & Sword. 2012. ISBN 978-1844159581.
  In this landmark book, Haythornthwaite traces the career of a British soldier from enlistment, through the key stages of his path through the military system, including combat, all the way to his eventual discharge.
- Picton's Division at Waterloo. London: Pen & Sword. 2016. ISBN 978-1781591024.
  He concentrates on the famous Fifth Division, commanded by Sir Thomas Picton, which was a key element in Wellington's Reserve. The experiences of this division form a microcosm of those of the entire army.

Other published works

- Uniforms of Waterloo in Color. USA: Hippocrene. 1974. ISBN 0-88254-283-4.
- The Napoleonic Source Book. Arms & Armour. 1990. ISBN 978-0-853-68969-0.
- Invincible Generals: Gustavus Adolphus, Marlborough, Frederick the Great, George Washington, Wellington. Firebird Books Ltd. 1991. ISBN 978-1-853-14105-8.
- The World War One Source Book. Arms & Armour. 1992. ISBN 978-1-854-09102-4.
- The Colonial Wars Source Book. Arms & Armour. 1995. ISBN 978-1-854-09196-3.
- Brassey's Almanac: The Peninsular War; The Complete Companion to the Iberian Campaigns, 1807–14. London: Chrysalis Books Group. 2004. ISBN 1-85753-329-1.

=== Collaborations ===
With Jack Cassin-Scott and John Fabb:

- Uniforms of the Napoleonic Wars in Colour 1796-1814. London: Blandford Press. 1973. ISBN 978-0713705720.
