= Pat Martinelli =

American football player (1919–1992)

Profile
- Position: Center

Personal information
- Born: July 27, 1919; Dunmore, Pennsylvania, U.S.
- Died: September 7, 1992 (aged 73); Rockville, Maryland, U.S.
- Listed height: 6 ft 0 in (1.83 m)
- Listed weight: 227 lb (103 kg)

Career information
- High school: Dunmore (PA)
- College: Scranton (1937–1940)
- NFL draft: 1941: undrafted

Career history
- Wilmington Clippers (1941–1942); Buffalo Bisons (1946); Scranton Miners (1946); Wilmington Clippers (1946–1949)

Pasquale Joseph Martinelli (July 27, 1919 – September 7, 1992) was an American professional football center. He played college football for the Scranton Royals. After college, he played professionally for the Wilmington Clippers of the American Association (AA) from 1941 to 1942, the Buffalo Bisons of the All-America Football Conference (AAFC) in 1946, the Scranton Miners of the American Football League (AFL) in 1946, and the Clippers again from 1946 to 1949.
