= Bert Kuczynski =

American baseball player (1920–1997)

Profile
- Position: End

Personal information
- Born: January 8, 1920; Port Richmond, Philadelphia, Pennsylvania, U.S.
- Died: January 19, 1997 (aged 77); Allentown, Pennsylvania, U.S.

Career information
- College: Pennsylvania
- NFL draft: 1943: 19th round, 171st overall pick

Career history
- 1943: Detroit Lions
- 1946: Philadelphia Eagles

Bert Kuczynski
- Pitcher
- Batted: Right Threw: Right

MLB debut
- June 2, 1943, for the Philadelphia Athletics

Last MLB appearance
- July 4, 1943, for the Philadelphia Athletics

MLB statistics
- Earned run average: 4.01
- Win–loss record: 0-1
- Strikeouts: 8
- Stats at Baseball Reference

Teams
- Philadelphia Athletics (1943)

Bernard Carl "Bert" Kuczynski (January 8, 1920 – January 19, 1997) was an American pitcher for the Philadelphia Athletics of the MLB and an American football tight end in the National Football League (NFL) for the Detroit Lions and Philadelphia Eagles. He went to Northeast High School for high school. He attended the University of Pennsylvania. Later he taught social studies and ancient civilizations for 27 years at Catasauqua High School and coached for the district.
