= Mike Mandarino =

American football player (1921–1985)

No. 62
- Position: T-C-G

Personal information
- Born: March 16, 1921; Philadelphia, Pennsylvania
- Died: 1985 (aged 64)

Career information
- College: La Salle

Career history
- Philadelphia Eagles (1944–1945)

Career statistics
- Games played: 13
- Games started: 0

Michael Pascol Mandarino (March 16, 1921 in Philadelphia, Pennsylvania – 1985) was an American football offensive lineman. He is one of only two La Salle Explorers to enter the National Football League. Mandarino used the money he earned as a professional football player to enter medical school, later providing medical services to the team he played for, the Philadelphia Eagles.

While playing for the Eagles, Mandarino reportedly attended classes from 8 a.m. to 5 p.m.. He would then rushed to the ballpark to practice under the lights with the Eagles, and after the game on Sundays he would again return to his studies. He repeated this routine in 1945, while as an intern. he reportedly earned $200 per game.

According to Mandarino, coach Greasy Neale reportedly told him to play tackle after Vic Sears was injured. Neale stated that "If you are smart enough to be a doctor, you are smart enough to learn two sets of plays". The following week, both of Eagles' centers, Bap Manzini and Vic Lindskog, were injured, so Greasy came back and told Mandarino that he "should be smart enough to learn three sets of plays".

He later taught at La Salle and won international fame for his research in orthopedic surgery.
