= Don Avery =

American football player (1921–2006)

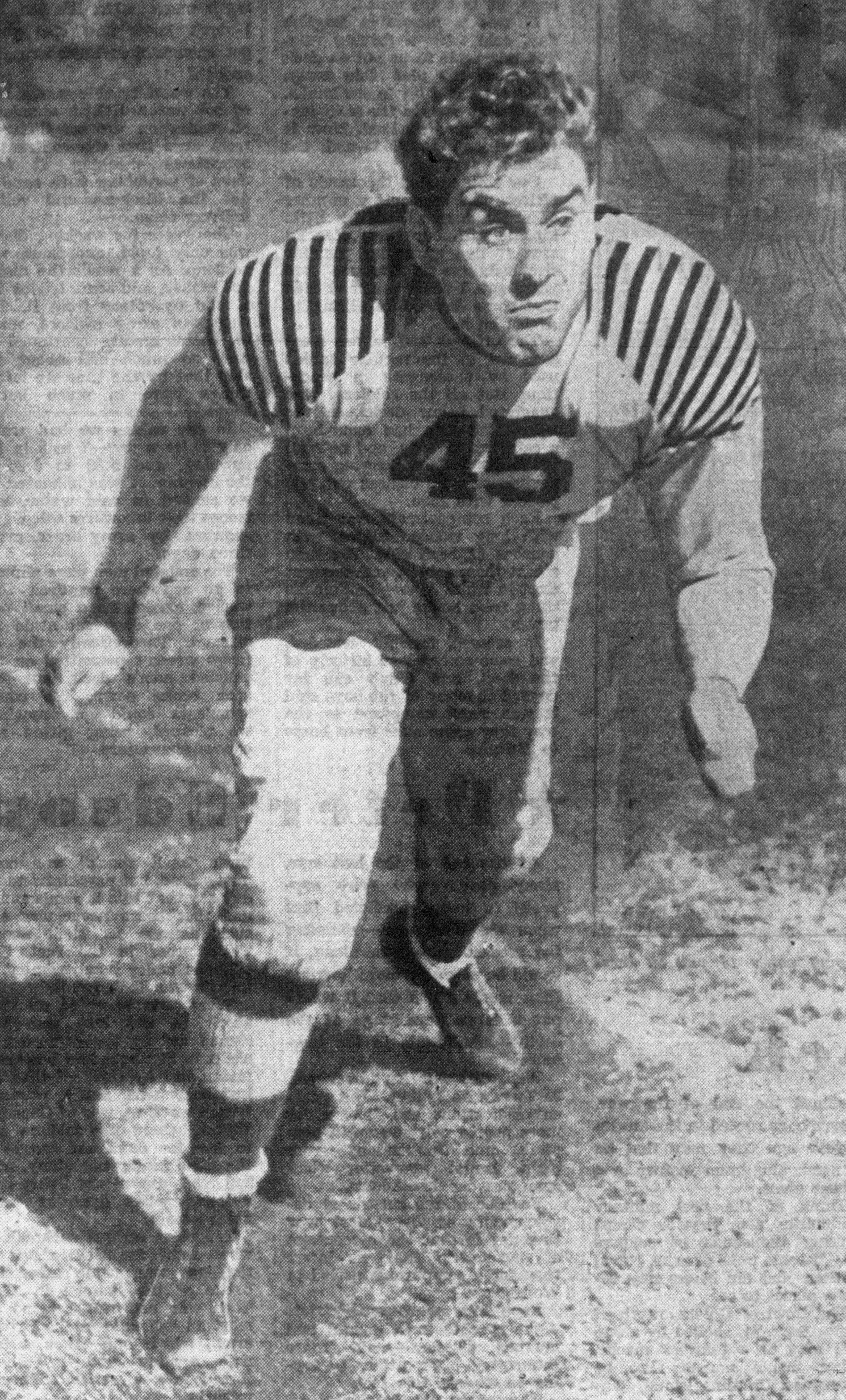
- Avery, circa 1942

No. 17
- Position: Offensive tackle

Personal information
- Born: February 10, 1921; Los Angeles, California, U.S.
- Died: August 8, 2006 (aged 85)

Career information
- College: Alabama; Southern California

Career history
- 1946–1947: Washington Redskins
- 1948: Los Angeles Dons (AAFC)

Donald Lee Avery (February 10, 1921 – August 8, 2006) was an American football offensive tackle in the National Football League for the Washington Redskins, as well as the Los Angeles Dons of the All-America Football Conference. He played college football at the University of Alabama and the University of Southern California in 1941–42 as an offensive lineman.

Avery served in the United States Army Air Forces during the World War II era. While in the military, he played tackle for the Second Army Air Forces Superbombers football team in 1944.
