= Carl Tomasello =

American football player (1917–1991)

- Tomasello in 1939

No. 43, 50, 22, 78, 4, 12, 18
- Position: End

Personal information
- Born: January 26, 1917; Dunmore, Pennsylvania, U.S.
- Died: October 29, 1991 (aged 74); Paterson, New Jersey, U.S.
- Listed height: 6 ft 0 in (1.83 m)
- Listed weight: 210 lb (95 kg)

Career information
- High school: Dunmore
- College: St. Thomas (PA) (1936-1939)
- NFL draft: 1940: 5th round, 40th overall pick

Career history
- New York Giants (1940); Jersey City Giants (1940-1941); Paterson Panthers (1942); Bainbridge Navy (1943-1944); Scranton Miners (1946); Jersey Giants (1947); Paterson Panthers (1947); Wilmington Clippers (1947)
- Stats at Pro Football Reference

Carl Antonio Tomasello (January 26, 1917 – October 29, 1991) was an American football player. A native of Dunmore, Pennsylvania, he played college football for St. Thomas (PA) (now known as the University of Scranton) from 1937 to 1939. As a senior, he was selected by the Associated Press as a first-team player on the Little All-America team. He was drafted by the New York Giants in the fifth round (40th overall pick) of the 1940 NFL draft. He appeared in only one NFL game but continued to play professional football in the American Association in 1940 and 1941 and, after the league was renamed, the American Football League from 1946 to 1947. During World War II, he served in the United States Navy and played for the undefeated 1943 and 1944 Bainbridge Commodores football teams. After retiring from football, he worked as an agent for Prudential Insurance Co. He and his wife Kathleen had 10 children. He died in 1991 at age 74.
