= Larry Weldon =

American football player (1915–1990)

No. 31
- Position: Quarterback

Personal information
- Born: June 24, 1915; Sumter, South Carolina, U.S.
- Died: August 17, 1990 (aged 75); Virginia Beach, Virginia, U.S.

Career information
- High school: Hillcrest (Dalzell, South Carolina)
- College: Presbyterian

Career history
- Washington Redskins (1944–1945)

Career statistics
- Games played: 12
- Stats at Pro Football Reference

Lawrence Davis "Coon" Weldon (June 24, 1915 – August 17, 1990) was an American football quarterback in the National Football League (NFL) for the Washington Redskins. He attended Presbyterian College.

== Early life ==
Weldon was born in Sumter, South Carolina, and attended Hillcrest High School in Dalzell, South Carolina, where he played high school football.

== College career ==
Weldon attended and played college football at Presbyterian College in Clinton, South Carolina. He also played baseball.

== Professional career ==
After college, Weldon played for the Portsmouth Cubs of the Dixie League, and won the championship in 1939 and 1940. He set a new league record by throwing seven touchdown passes in the span of ten games. Over a span of 20 games in 1939 and 1940, the Cubs managed to win 16 games, lose two, and tie two games (a .889 winning percentage). He led the Dixie league in scoring in 1938 and 1939, and was named the league MVP in 1939. He returned to the Dixie League in 1946, and played for the Norfolk Shamrocks.

While playing in the Dixie League, Weldon also played Minor League Baseball (MiLB) as a pitcher under the moniker "Larry Jacobs". He took the assumed name because he was under contract to the St. Louis Cardinals and didn't want the owners to know he was playing football. He also used this name with the San Diego Padres. Among other teams, he played for the Spartanburg Spartans, a Cardinals' farm team in the South Atlantic (Sally) League.

Weldon played in the National Football League (NFL) for the Washington Redskins in 1944-1945. He was the backup quarterback behind future Hall of Fame quarterback Sammy Baugh.

After playing with the Redskins, Weldon played for the Wilmington Clippers of the American Football League in 1946. He returned as coach for the Clippers in 1949, after a brief stint as an assistant coach at West Virginia University.

== Coaching career ==
After retiring from professional football, Weldon became a high school football coach. He was the head football coach at Cradock High School in Portsmouth, Virginia, for 19 seasons (now Woodrow Wilson High School), then stepped down in 1969 to become the athletic director, a position he held until 1972. He then resigned to become a principal in Lunenburg County, Virginia. He also coached at Bishopville High School in Bishopville, South Carolina, Hargrave Military Academy, and Presbyterian College.

In 1946, Weldon hired Art Baker as Sumter High School's B-team head coach, which was Baker's first coaching position. Baker went on to be the head coach of the Furman (1973–1977), The Citadel (1978–1982) and East Carolina (1985–1988) college football programs. In 1948, Weldon was chosen to be the head coach of "Lower State" team in the first annual South Carolina high school football all-star game, which they won.

== Personal life ==
Weldon was married with four children. He died on August 17, 1990, in Virginia Beach, Virginia.
