= George Slagle =

- c. 1940

Profile
- Position: Guard

Personal information
- Born: between 1899 and 1904; Beckley, West Virginia, U.S.
- Died: Unknown

Career information
- College: University of Pennsylvania

Career history

Playing
- Atlantic City (?); Canton Bulldogs (?); New York Giants (?); Chicago Bears (?); Louisville Colonels (1926); Cincinnati (?); Wilmington (?); Boston Shamrocks (?); Scranton (?)

Coaching
- Wilmington Clippers (1937); Scranton Miners (1939); Pottstown High School (1940); Johns Hopkins (c. 1941–?) Coaching advisor; Philadelphia High School (?); Landon School (1945); Washington, D.C. High School (?); Alexandria, Virginia High School (?); Bullard-Havens Technical High School (1960)

Career statistics
- Games played: 1
- Stats at Pro Football Reference

George B. "Dutch" Slagle, also called Geoffrey Slagle, was an American football guard and coach. He played one game in the National Football League (NFL) for the Louisville Colonels, and later coached the Wilmington Clippers and Scranton Miners, as well as several high school teams.

A native of Beckley, West Virginia, Slagle attended the University of Pennsylvania, where he earned a bachelor's degree and a master's degree. After graduating, Slagle spent time professionally with "Atlantic City, Canton [Bulldogs], New York [Giants], Chicago [Bears], Louisville [Colonels], Cincinnati, and Wilmington," according to The Tribune, though his only known game in the National Football League (NFL) came in 1926 with Louisville. The Colonels, after suffering a defeat in the first game of the season, "re-arranged" their lineup for their matchup with the Detroit Panthers, and signed several players including Slagle. In the game, a 0–47 loss, he appeared as a substitute for Pete Vainowski. He was released after the game. Slagle also played for the Boston Shamrocks and a team in Scranton, Pennsylvania, according to The Bridgeport Post.

In 1936, Slagle started a coaching career, becoming the head coach of the newly formed Wilmington Clippers. They played their first season in 1937, compiling a 7–4 record under Coach Slagle. He resigned from his coaching position in 1938, citing salary differences and other coaching offers.

In 1939, Slagle was hired as the head coach of the Scranton Miners, a team in the Eastern Pennsylvania Football League (EPFL). He accepted a position at Pottstown High School in 1940 to be head football coach and English teacher, but resigned in December that year. When asked if he was going to coach a team in 1941, he replied, "I'm not denying and I'm not confirming." He later served as an advisor to Johns Hopkins football coaches as well as several other stints with schools in Philadelphia, Washington, D.C., and Alexandria, Virginia, before becoming Bullard-Havens Technical High School coach in 1960.
