= Jim Gaffney =

American football player (1921–2015)

No. 34
- Positions: Quarterback, halfback

Personal information
- Born: April 26, 1921; Cumberland, Maryland, U.S.
- Died: August 9, 2015 (aged 94); Cumberland, Maryland, U.S.
- Listed height: 6 ft 1 in (1.85 m)
- Listed weight: 204 lb (93 kg)

Career information
- High school: Allegany (Cumberland)
- College: Tennessee
- NFL draft: 1944: 15th round, 149th overall pick

Career history
- Washington Redskins (1945–1946)

Career NFL statistics
- Rushing yards: 90
- Rushing average: 3.5
- Total touchdowns: 1
- Stats at Pro Football Reference

James Thomas Gaffney Jr. (April 26, 1921 – August 9, 2015) was an American professional football player who was a quarterback in the National Football League (NFL) for the Washington Redskins in 1945 and 1946. In Week 3 of the 1946 season against Detroit, he scored a receiving touchdown from Sammy Baugh. He played college football for the Tennessee Volunteers and was selected in the 15th round of the 1944 NFL draft with the 149th overall pick.
