= Walt Masters =

American baseball player

Profile
- Positions: Halfback, quarterback

Personal information
- Born: March 28, 1907; Pen Argyl, Pennsylvania, U.S.
- Died: July 10, 1992 (aged 85); Ottawa, Ontario, Canada

Career information
- College: University of Pennsylvania

Career history

Playing
- 1936: Philadelphia Eagles
- 1937–1940: Wilmington Clippers
- 1943: Chicago Cardinals
- 1944: Card-Pitt
- 1947: Ottawa Trojans

Coaching
- 1933–1934: Ottawa Rough Riders
- 1938–1940: Wilmington Clippers
- 1948–1950: Ottawa Rough Riders

Awards and highlights
- CFL Eastern All-Star (1932)

Other information
- Baseball career
- Pitcher
- Batted: Right Threw: Right

MLB debut
- July 9, 1931, for the Washington Senators

Last MLB appearance
- August 25, 1939, for the Philadelphia Athletics

MLB statistics
- Win–loss record: 0–0
- Earned run average: 6.00
- Strikeouts: 3
- Stats at Baseball Reference

Teams
- Washington Senators (1931); Philadelphia Phillies (1937); Philadelphia Athletics (1939)

Walter Thomas Masters (March 28, 1907 – July 10, 1992) was an American MLB pitcher and an American football halfback and quarterback in the National Football League (NFL).

Masters went directly from college to the majors in 1931 but barely pitched in his first season with the Washington Senators. He went to the Youngstown Buckeyes the next year and went 11–14 for the Central League team but his 3.12 ERA was second-best among pitchers with 10 or more decisions. He was 3–3 with a 5.49 ERA for the International League's Albany Senators in 1933. After two years out of organized baseball (during which time he coached the Canadian football team Ottawa Rough Riders and played in the semipro St. Lawrence League) Masters was president, manager and business manager of the Ottawa Senators in the Can–Am League in 1936. He went 11–8 with a 4.40 ERA and played the outfield at times, hitting .270 with 4 homers and 40 RBI. Masters (a Knute Rockne All-American in college) played in the NFL that year as well, appearing for the Philadelphia Eagles as a quarterback.

Masters returned to the majors for limited duty in 1937 and 1939 (appearing in a total of 6 games) then went 8–10 in 1940 for the Wilmington Blue Rocks and Portland Beavers. Masters then returned to the NFL and played in 1942 for the Chicago Cardinals as a punter-quarterback and in 1943 with the Card-Pitt. Overall, he did not excel in the NFL, averaging a loss of .6 yards per carry, completing under a third of his passes and throwing five times as many interceptions as touchdowns.

After six years out of organized baseball, Masters pitched for the Ottawa Nationals and went 11–4 with a 3.22 ERA and won both ends of a doubleheader. Masters finished his baseball career at the age of 40 in that 1947 campaign.

After retirement, Masters did public relations work for a company in Ottawa, Ontario.
