= Wilmington Park =

Ballpark in Wilmington, Delaware

Coordinates: 39.751981°N 75.525091°W

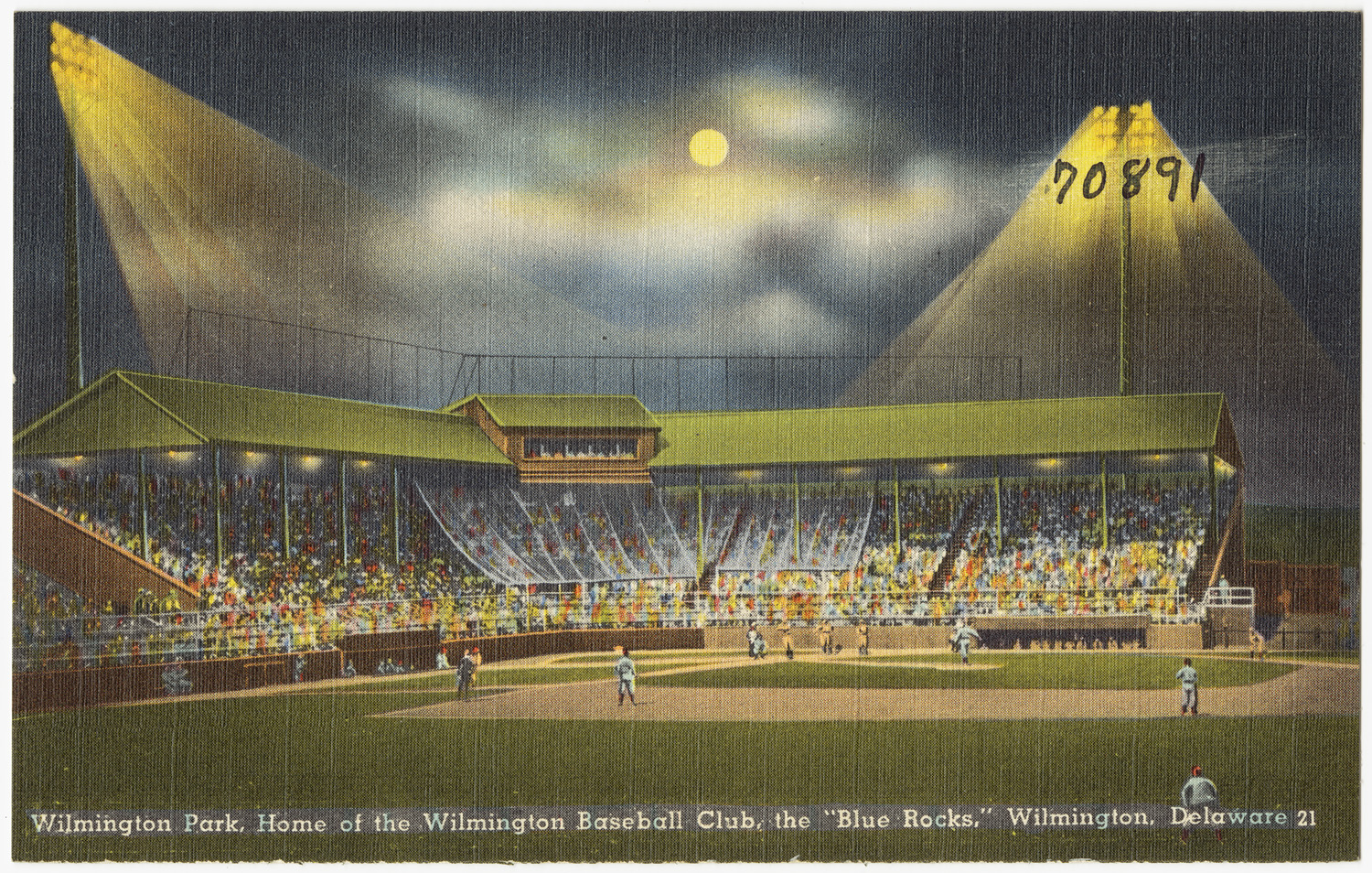
- Interactive map of Wilmington Park
- Location: Governor Printz Blvd & E 30th St; Wilmington, DE 19802
- Capacity: 7,000
- Surface: Grass

Construction
- Groundbreaking: 1939
- Opened: May 1, 1940
- Demolished: 1963
- Cost: $185,000

Tenants
- Wilmington Clippers (AA) (1939–1941, 1946–1949); Wilmington Blue Rocks (InL) (1940–1952); Philadelphia Athletics (AL) (spring training) (1943); Philadelphia Phillies (NL) (spring training) (1944–1945); University of Delaware football (1940–1952)

Wilmington Park was a ballpark in Wilmington, Delaware that was located at the corner of 30th Street and Governor Printz Boulevard. It was home to the University of Delaware football team from 1940 to 1952 and the Wilmington Blue Rocks of the Class B Interstate League from 1940 to 1952. The Blue Rocks were an affiliate of the Philadelphia Athletics from 1940 to 1943 and the Philadelphia Phillies from 1944 to 1952.

== History ==
Early in 1940, construction plans for the ballpark were announced. The park was bounded by 30th Street (northeast, third base); Governor Printz Boulevard a.k.a. Northeast Boulevard (southeast, left field); 28th Street (southwest, right field); and Church Street and eventually Kerry Drive-In Theater (to the northwest, first base). Dimensions for left and right field were reported as 334 feet (102 m) and 360 feet (110 m) respectively.

The Wilmington Blue Rocks minor league baseball team played at the ballpark from 1940 to 1952. They opened the park on May 1, 1940, with a 3-1 victory over Trenton, in front of 7,000 fans.

The Blue Rocks established a Class B attendance record in 1940 with 145,643 attending ballgames at Wilmington Park. The club topped that mark with 172,531 fans in 1944. The single game attendance record for the Blue Rocks was set in 1947 when 7,062 fans saw Curt Simmons’ Wilmington debut. Attendance in 1950 dropped to 38,678, and despite a slight improvement to 43,135 in 1951, attendance continued to decline in 1952, the last for the Blue Rocks at the ballpark.

5,907 fans watched the Brooklyn Dodgers and New York Yankees play a preseason exhibition game on April 10, 1941.

On September 17, 1941, Lou Brooks, "the first Delawarean to make a mark in the upper weight classes," was originally scheduled for a ten round heavyweight bout against Buddy Knox at Wilmington Park, but instead fought Lee Savold.

In the second edition of The Great Delaware Sports Book, Doug Gelbert wrote: "Brooks won his first nine professional scraps, eight by knockout, when he was matched with Lee Savold at Wilmington Park. Savold was a bruising puncher who had once taken Joe Louis' best blows. Newspaper accounts estimated the gate at over 8,000, promoter Bob Carpenter claimed 10,000. Whatever, it was Delaware's biggest boxing crowd ever and they saw one of the state's best ever boxing shows. Brooks entered the ring a 3-1 underdog and weathered Savold's bombs for five rounds, giving as good as he got. But in the 6th round the Wilmington light-heavyweight fell under the onslaught of Savold's withering body punches." Savold proceeded to win his next bouts, including a TKO over Knox on December 2, 1941.

During World War II, in January 1943, Major League Baseball Commissioner Kenesaw Mountain Landis ordered most Major League clubs to hold spring training north of the Ohio and Potomac rivers to comply with government requests to help the war effort by eliminating nonessential travel. The Philadelphia Athletics held spring training at Wilmington Park in 1943 and the Philadelphia Phillies at the park in 1944 and 1945.

In addition to World War II-spring training games at Wilmington Park, the Phillies played occasional exhibition games at the ballpark including games against the Blue Rocks. The Phillies and Athletics had long played pre-season exhibition games against each other in the Philadelphia City Series. The A's moved to Kansas City prior to the 1955 season but returned to the Philadelphia-area for a final match-up prior to 1955 Opening Day. They played the 1955 series at Wilmington where the A's beat the Phillies 9–6 on April 9, 1955, and 10–2 on April 10, 1955.

The Philadelphia Stars Negro league baseball team hosted the Newark Eagles at the ballpark on Memorial Day in 1945.

The University of Delaware Fightin' Blue Hens football team played its home games at the park from 1940 until 1952. Delaware had played at Frazer Field in Newark before moving to Wilmington Park midway through the 1940 season. Delaware played its first game at Wilmington Park on November 9, 1940, and beat Pennsylvania Military College 14–7. While Delaware continued to play occasional games at Frazer Field through the 1946 season, the team played its home games at Wilmington Park until midway through the 1952 season. In their last game at the ballpark, Delaware beat Pennsylvania Military College, 43–20. Delaware finished the 1952 season at the brand-new Delaware Stadium which returned the team to Newark and the university campus.

With the primary tenants gone after 1952, debate about what to do with the park was a perennial topic for about the next decade. The property was finally sold in February, 1962. Later in the year, Wilmington Park and the Drive-In were both demolished to make room for a shopping center.
