= Les Dodson =

American football player (1916–1998)

No. 5, 4, 24, 1, 11
- Position: Back

Personal information
- Born: April 18, 1916; Birmingham, Alabama, U.S.
- Died: July 25, 1998 (aged 82); Lakeland, Florida, U.S.
- Listed height: 6 ft 1 in (1.85 m)
- Listed weight: 180 lb (82 kg)

Career information
- High school: West Lowndes (Columbus, Mississippi)
- College: Ole Miss (1937–1940)
- NFL draft: 1941: 14th round, 121st overall pick

Career history

Playing
- Pittsburgh Steelers (1941); Wilmington Clippers (1941–1947)

Coaching
- Wilmington Clippers (1946) Head coach

Career NFL statistics
- Passing yards: 7
- TD–INT: 0-3
- Stats at Pro Football Reference

James Leslie Dodson (April 18, 1916 – July 25, 1998) was an American professional football back who played for the Pittsburgh Steelers of the National Football League (NFL) in 1941. After playing college football for Ole Miss, he was selected by the Philadelphia Eagles in the 14th round of the 1941 NFL draft. His rights were transferred to the Steelers due to the events later referred to as the Pennsylvania Polka.
