= Eddie Michaels =

American football player (1914–1976)

No. 18, 22, 13, 57, 60
- Position: Offensive lineman

Personal information
- Born: June 11, 1914; Wilmington, Delaware, U.S.
- Died: January 21, 1976 (aged 61); Wilmington, Delaware, U.S.
- Listed height: 5 ft 11 in (1.80 m)
- Listed weight: 205 lb (93 kg)

Career information
- High school: Salesianum School
- College: Villanova (1932-1935)
- NFL draft: 1936: 2nd round, 14th overall pick

Career history

Playing
- Chicago Bears (1936); Washington Redskins (1937); Wilmington Clippers (1938–1942); Steagles (1943); Philadelphia Eagles (1944–1946); Wilmington Clippers (1947); Ottawa Rough Riders (1948–1950)

Coaching
- Wilmington Clippers (1939-1941, 1947) Line coach

Awards and highlights
- NFL champion (1937); 4× American Association All-Star; First-team All-American (1935); First-team All-Eastern (1935)

Career NFL statistics
- Games played: 62
- Games started: 38
- Stats at Pro Football Reference

Edward Joseph Michaels (born Mikolajewski) (June 11, 1914 – January 21, 1976) was an American professional football guard in the National Football League (NFL) for the Chicago Bears, Washington Redskins, and Philadelphia Eagles.

== Biography ==
Eddie Michaels (née Mikolajewski) was born June 11, 1914 in Wilmington, Delaware. He attended Salesianum School, a Catholic boys' school in Wilmington before attending Villanova University.

He was selected in the second round of the 1936 NFL draft. Originally selected by the Chicago Bears, following the 1936 season he moved to the Washington Redskins for 1937, where he was part of the 1937 NFL Championship team, playing primarily in a reserve role.

He also played for the Wilmington Clippers from 1938 to 1942, and 1947. From 1948 to 1950 he played in Canada for the Ottawa Rough Riders.

Michaels also played on the "Steagles", a merged team consisting of the Eagles and Pittsburgh Steelers in 1943. The team was the result of a league-wide manning shortage brought on by World War II. Many of the "Steagles" players were labeled 4-F's, those deemed physically unfit due to ailments such as ulcers, flat feet and even partial blindness. Michaels was labeled a 4F because he was nearly deaf.

Michaels died in Wilmington on January 21, 1976. He was inducted into the Delaware Sports Museum and Hall of Fame later in the year of his death.
