= George Veneroso =

American football player and coach (1909–1996)

No. 35, 26, 40, 50
- Positions: Head coach, right tackle

Personal information
- Born: February 27, 1909; Hazleton, Pennsylvania, U.S.
- Died: September 25, 1996 (aged 87); Hazleton, Pennsylvania, U.S.
- Listed height: 5 ft 11 in (1.80 m)
- Listed weight: 210 lb (95 kg)

Career information
- High school: Hazleton (PA)
- College: George Washington University, Temple University

Career history

Playing
- Wilmington Clippers (1937); Baltimore Blue Birds (1937); Wilmington Clippers (1938–1940)

Coaching
- Wilmington Clippers (1941–1942, 1947–1948)

Awards and highlights
- American Association champion (1941)

Head coaching record
- Regular season: 19–12–5 (.597)
- Postseason: 3–1 (.750)
- Career: 22–13–5 (.613)

George Louis Veneroso (February 27, 1909 – September 25, 1996) was an American football right tackle and coach who played for the Wilmington Clippers and Baltimore Blue Birds and later served as Clippers head coach. He was a player from 1937 to 1940 and a coach from 1941 to 1942, and again from 1947 to 1948. Veneroso was the coach of the Clippers when they won the American Association championship in 1941. He died on September 25, 1996, at the age of 87.
