= Wilmington Clippers =

Defunct American football team

Logo

General information
- Founded: 1937
- Folded: 1950
- Stadium: Wilmington Park
- Headquartered: Wilmington, Delaware
- Colors: Navy Blue, Red

Personnel
- Owner: Lammot du Pont Jr. (1937–1949)
- Head coach: Dutch Slagle (1937); Walt Masters (1938–1940); George Veneroso (1941–1942, 1947–1948); Les Dodson (1946); Doug Turley (1949); Larry Weldon (1949)

Team history
- Wilmington Clippers (1937–1942, 1946–1949)

League / conference affiliations
- Independent (1937–1938, 1942); American Association (1939–1941, 1946–1949) Southern (1939) None (1940–1941) Western (1946–1947) None (1948–1949)

Championships
- League championships: 1 AA (1941)

The Wilmington Clippers were a professional American football team that played from 1937 to 1942, and from 1946 to 1949. They played in the American Association from 1939 to 1941, later returning for the 1946 to 1949 seasons when the league was known as the American Football League. They were located in Wilmington, Delaware. The Clippers played as an independent team from 1937 to 1938, and in 1942.

== Early years ==
Wilmington was an independent team from 1937 to 1938. Their record in 1937 was 5–4 and 10–2 in 1938. Vince Lombardi had a brief stint with the team in 1937.

== American Association / American Football League tenure ==
In 1939, the Clippers joined the American Association. The team included Jack Ferrante, an end who led the league in touchdowns. The Wilmington Clippers finished the season with 9 wins, 3 losses, and a tie. They made the playoffs but lost to the Newark Bears, 13–6 (Wilmington protested the use of Sid Luckman who owner George Halas sent in for the Newark Bears because he had been with the Chicago Bears all season).

In 1940, the Clippers finished with a 5–4–1 record and made the playoffs. In the semifinals, they beat the Paterson Panthers 11–8. The team reached the championship but lost to the Jersey City Giants, 17–7.

In 1941, the Wilmington Clippers finished with a 4–3–2 record, placing third in the league's regular season standings. Among their notable players was guard Ed Michaels. who made the All-Star team for the third year in a row. They reached the semifinals of the playoffs and defeated Paterson 33–0, then defeated the 8–2 Long Island Indians by a score of 21–13, with Jack Ferrante scoring two touchdowns.

The American Association suspended due to World War II in 1942 but the Clippers kept playing, being an independent team. They were considered one of the top non-NFL teams and finished with a record of 8–0–1; their lone tie was to the NFL's Philadelphia Eagles.

The team suspended from 1943 to 1945 due to the war. The American Association returned under the name American Football League in 1946 and the Clippers returned. The team had their worst season in 1946, finishing with a 1–7–2 record.

In 1947, the Wilmington Clippers finished with a 2–5–1 record and missed the playoffs. Three-time all-star Ed Michaels returned and won another all-star selection.

In the 1948 season, the team finished with a 5–4–1 record, made the playoffs and defeated the Richmond Rebels to reach the championship. They lost the game, 24–14, against the Paterson Panthers.

The Clippers played their last season in 1949, recording a 5–5 regular season record before being defeated 66–0 in the playoff semifinals by the Richmond Rebels. They dropped out of the league afterwards and were replaced by a team called the Brooklyn Brooks; the league folded following the 1950 season.

== Stadium ==
For the majority of their existence, the Clippers played at Wilmington Park, although for their first three years their home stadium was Pennsy Field.
