= 1935 Big Ten Conference football season =

- Sport: Football
- Teams: 10
- Top draft pick: Jay Berwanger
- Champion: Minnesota
- Runners-up: Ohio State
- Season MVP: Jay Berwanger

Football seasons
- 1934 1936

1935 Big Ten Conference football standings
	Conf.					Overall
Team	W		L		T	W		L		T
No. 1 Minnesota +	5	–	0	–	0	8	–	0	–	0
No. 5 Ohio State +	5	–	0	–	0	7	–	1	–	0
Purdue	3	–	3	–	0	4	–	4	–	0
Indiana	2	–	2	–	1	4	–	3	–	1
No. 16 Northwestern	2	–	3	–	1	4	–	3	–	1
No. 18 Iowa	1	–	2	–	2	4	–	2	–	2
Chicago	2	–	3	–	0	4	–	4	–	0
Michigan	2	–	3	–	0	4	–	4	–	0
Illinois	1	–	4	–	0	3	–	5	–	0
Wisconsin	1	–	4	–	0	1	–	7	–	0
+ – Conference co-champions; Rankings from United Press

The 1935 Big Ten Conference football season was the 40th season of college football played by the member schools of the Big Ten Conference (also known as the Western Conference) and was a part of the 1935 college football season.

The 1935 Minnesota Golden Gophers football team, under head coach Bernie Bierman, compiled an undefeated 8–0 record, outscored opponents, 194 to 36, and has been recognized as the 1935 national champion by seven of the 13 selectors recognized as official by the NCAA. Tackle Ed Widseth was a consensus, first-team All-American.

The 1935 Ohio State Buckeyes football team, under head coach Francis Schmidt, compiled a 7–1 record, tied with Minnesota for the Big Ten championship, led the conference in scoring offense (29.6 points per game), and outscored opponents, 237 to 57. Ohio State's sole loss was to Notre Dame by an 18-13 score. Center Gomer Jones was a consensus, first-team All-American.

Chicago Maroons halfback Jay Berwanger was the first recipient of the Heisman Trophy, received the Chicago Tribune Silver Football as the Big Ten's most valuable player, and was the first player selected in the 1936 NFL draft.

== Season overview ==
=== Results and team statistics ===
Conf. Rank	Team	Head coach	Overall record	Conf. record	UP final	PPG	PAG	MVP
1 (tie)	Minnesota	Bernie Bierman	8–0	5–0	#1	24.3	5.8	Babe LeVoir
1 (tie)	Ohio State	Francis Schmidt	7–1	5–0	#5	29.6	7.1	Gomer Jones
3	Purdue	Noble Kizer	4–4	3–3	NR	8.1	7.1	Frank Loebs
4	Indiana	Bo McMillin	4–3–1	2–2–1	NR	8.8	6.9	Wendel Walker
5	Northwestern	Pappy Waldorf	4–3–1	2–3–1	#16	11.3	9.9	Wally Cruice
6	Iowa	Ossie Solem	4–2–2	1–2–2	#18	15.3	4.9	Dick Crayne
7 (tie)	Chicago	Clark Shaughnessy	4–4	2–3	NR	12.8	13.8	Jay Berwanger
7 (tie)	Michigan	Harry Kipke	4–4	2–3	NR	8.5	16.4	William Renner
9 (tie)	Illinois	Robert Zuppke	3–5	1–4	NR	7.4	6.8	Ed Gryboski
9 (tie)	Wisconsin	Clarence Spears	1–7	1–4	NR	6.6	21.4	Eddie Jankowski

Key
UP final = Rankings from UP sports writers. See 1935UP sports writers' poll
PPG = Average of points scored per game
PAG = Average of points allowed per game
MVP = Most valuable player as voted by players on each team as part of the voting process to determine the winner of the Chicago Tribune Silver Football trophy

=== Bowl games ===
No Big Ten teams participated in any bowl games during the 1935 season.

== All-Big Ten players ==
The following players were picked by the Associated Press (AP), the United Press (UP) and/or the Newspaper Enterprise Association (NEA) as first-team players on the 1935 All-Big Ten Conference football team.

Position	Name	Team	Selectors
Quarterback	Babe LeVoir	Minnesota	AP, UP
Halfback	Jay Berwanger	Chicago	AP, NEA [quarterback], UP
Halfback	Ozzie Simmons	Iowa	AP, NEA [fullback], UP
Halfback	Andy Pilney	Notre Dame	NEA
Fullback	Sheldon Beise	Minnesota	AP, NEA [halfback], UP
End	Merle Wendt	Ohio State	AP, NEA, UP
End	Matt Patanelli	Michigan	UP
End	Henry W. Longfellow	Northwestern	AP
End	Trevor J. Rees	Ohio State	NEA
Tackle	Ed Widseth	Minnesota	AP, NEA, UP
Tackle	Dick Smith	Minnesota	AP, NEA, UP
Guard	Paul Tangora	Northwestern	AP, UP
Guard	Bud Wilkinson	Minnesota	AP, NEA
Guard	Ed Grybowski	Illinois	UP
Center	Gomer Jones	Ohio State	AP, UP
Center	Ted Osmaloski	Iowa	NEA

== All-Americans ==
Three Big Ten players were selected as consensus first-team players on the 1935 College Football All-America Team. They were:

Position	Name	Team	Selectors
Halfback	Jay Berwanger	Chicago	AAB, AP, COL, INS, LIB, NANA, NEA, TSN, UP, CP, KCS, NYS, PTH, WCFF
Tackle	Ed Widseth	Minnesota	AAB, INS, LIB, NANA, TSN, UP, CP, KCS
Center	Gomer Jones	Ohio State	AAB, LIB, NANA, UP, CP, KCS, WCFF

Other Big Ten players received first-team honors from at least one selector. They were:

Position	Name	Team	Selectors
Tackle	Dick Smith	Minnesota	AP, COL, INS, NEA, UP, NYS, PTH
End	Merle Wendt	Ohio State	LIB, NEA
Guard	Paul Tangora	Northwestern	AP, TSN
Guard	Inwood Smith	Ohio State	COL, PTH
Halfback	Ozzie Simmons	Iowa	TSN
Fullback	Sheldon Beise	Minnesota	NANA, CP

== 1936 NFL draft ==
The following Big Ten players were among the first 100 players selected in the 1936 NFL draft:

Name	Position	Team	Round	Overall pick
Jay Berwanger	Halfback	Chicago	1	1
Dick Crayne	Fullback	Iowa	1	4
