= 1935 Michigan Wolverines football team =

American college football season

1935 Michigan Wolverines football
- Conference: Big Ten Conference
- Record: 4–4 (2–3 Big Ten)
- Head coach: Harry Kipke (7th season)
- MVP: William Renner
- Captain: William Renner
- Home stadium: Michigan Stadium

1935 Big Ten Conference football standings
	Conf.					Overall
Team	W		L		T	W		L		T
No. 1 Minnesota +	5	–	0	–	0	8	–	0	–	0
No. 5 Ohio State +	5	–	0	–	0	7	–	1	–	0
Purdue	3	–	3	–	0	4	–	4	–	0
Indiana	2	–	2	–	1	4	–	3	–	1
No. 16 Northwestern	2	–	3	–	1	4	–	3	–	1
No. 18 Iowa	1	–	2	–	2	4	–	2	–	2
Chicago	2	–	3	–	0	4	–	4	–	0
Michigan	2	–	3	–	0	4	–	4	–	0
Illinois	1	–	4	–	0	3	–	5	–	0
Wisconsin	1	–	4	–	0	1	–	7	–	0
+ – Conference co-champions; Rankings from United Press

The 1935 Michigan Wolverines football team represented the University of Michigan in the 1935 college football season. In their seventh season under head coach Harry Kipke, the Wolverines compiled a 4–4 record (2–3 against Big Ten Conference opponents, finished in a tie for seventh place in the Big Ten), and were outscored by opponents by a combined total of 131 to 68. The team had a 4–1 record after five games, but was shut out in its final three games. Michigan's 40–0 loss to 1935 consensus national champion Minnesota in the annual Little Brown Jug game was the worst defeat suffered by a Michigan Wolverines football team since 1892.

All eight opponents faced by the Wolverines during the 1935 season were led by head coaches who were later inducted into the College Football Hall of Fame. Quarterback William Renner was the team captain and also received the team's most valuable player award. End Matt Patanelli was the only Michigan player selected as a first-team player on the 1935 All-Big Ten Conference football team. Halfback Chris Everhardus was the team's leading scorer with 13 points.

== Schedule ==
Date	Opponent	Site	Result	Attendance
October 5	Michigan State*	Michigan Stadium; Ann Arbor, MI (rivalry)	L 6–25	32,315
October 12	Indiana	Michigan Stadium; Ann Arbor, MI	W 7–0	18,533
October 19	at Wisconsin	Camp Randall Stadium; Madison, WI	W 20–12	14,381
October 26	at Columbia*	Baker Field; New York, NY	W 19–7	24,901
November 2	Penn*^{†}	Michigan Stadium; Ann Arbor, MI	W 16–6	30,751
November 9	at Illinois	Memorial Stadium; Champaign, IL (rivalry)	L 0–3	28,136
November 16	Minnesota	Michigan Stadium; Ann Arbor, MI (Little Brown Jug)	L 0–40	32,029
November 23	Ohio State	Michigan Stadium; Ann Arbor, MI (rivalry)	L 0–38	53,322
*Non-conference game; ^{†}Homecoming

== Game summaries ==
=== Michigan State ===
Week 1: Michigan State at Michigan

Team	1	2	3	4	Total
• Michigan State	7	6	6	6	25
Michigan	6	0	0	0	6

- Date: October 5
- Location: Michigan Stadium
- Referee: Lourie

On October 5, 1935, Michigan opened its 1935 season with its annual rivalry game against the Michigan State Spartans. The Spartans had defeated the Wolverines in 1934 for the first time since 1915. Led by head coach Charlie Bachman and left halfback Kurt Warmbein, the Spartans again defeated the Wolverines, 25 to 6. It was the first time the Spartans had defeated the Wolverines in consecutive games. Michigan's only touchdown was scored in the first quarter. Lining up for a placekick, William Renner threw a short touchdown pass to Cedric Sweet. Chris Everhardus missed the kick for extra point. Despite the one-sided score, Tod Rockwell opined in the Detroit Free Press that the 1935 Wolverines appeared to be a much better team than the 1934 Wolverines that had compiled a 1–7 record.

=== Indiana ===
Week 2: Indiana at Michigan

Team	1	2	3	4	Total
Indiana	0	0	0	0	0
• Michigan	0	7	0	0	7

- Date: October 12
- Location: Michigan Stadium
- Referee: Lourie

On October 12, 1935, Michigan defeated Bo McMillin's Indiana Hoosiers, 7 to 0, at Michigan Stadium. The victory was Michigan's first over a Big Ten Conference opponents since the 1933 season. Indiana out-gained Michigan, 296 to 113, but the Wolverines held the Hoosiers scoreless. The only touchdown of the game was scored in the second quarter when Indiana fumbled a punt and Michigan end Matt Patanelli fell on the loose ball in the Indiana end zone. Johnny Viergever kicked the extra point.

=== At Wisconsin ===
Week 3: Michigan at Wisconsin

Team	1	2	3	4	Total
• Michigan	13	7	0	0	20
Wisconsin	0	0	6	6	12

- Date: October 19
- Location: Camp Randall Stadium
  Madison, WI
- Referee: Huegel

On October 19, 1935, Michigan defeated Clarence Spears' Wisconsin Badgers, 20 to 12, at Camp Randall Stadium in Madison, Wisconsin. Quarterback William Renner threw three touchdown passes (two in the first quarter, one in the second) to lead Michigan to a 20 to 0 lead at halftime. Renner threw touchdown passes covering 10 yards to Johnny Smithers, 13 yards to Mike Savage, and 25 yards to Chris Everhardus. Johnny Viergever and Chris Everhardus each kicked one extra point. An injury to Renner's hand late in the second quarter slowed the Wolverines in the second half, and Wisconsin scored twice in the second half to narrow the gap.

=== At Columbia ===
Week 4: Michigan at Columbia

Team	1	2	3	4	Total
• Michigan	12	0	7	0	19
Columbia Lions	0	0	7	0	7

- Date: October 26
- Location: Baker Field
  New York City
- Referee: Crowell

On October 26, 1935, Michigan played Lou Little's Columbia Lions at Baker Field in New York. Little's teams had lost only one game in each of the 1933 and 1934 seasons and had defeated Stanford in the 1934 Rose Bowl. Michigan defeated the Lions, 19 to 7. On the opening kickoff, Columbia fumbled a backward pass, and Matt Patanelli recovered the ball for Michigan at Columbia's 17-yard line. Johnny Smithers scored three plays later on a short run. Chris Everhardus returned a punt 42 yards for Michigan's second touchdown, giving Michigan a 13 to 0 lead in the first quarter. Michigan and Columbia each scored touchdowns in the third quarter. Michigan's final tally came on a five-yard touchdown pass from Bill Renner to Ernest Johnson, and Steve Remias kicked the extra point. Al Barabas, star of the 1934 Rose Bowl, ran 74 yards for Columbia's only touchdown.

=== Penn ===
Week 5: Penn at Michigan

Team	1	2	3	4	Total
Penn	0	0	0	6	6
• Michigan	6	7	0	3	16

- Date: November 2
- Location: Michigan Stadium
- Game attendance: 30,751
- Referee: Gardner

On November 2, 1935, Michigan defeated Harvey Harman's Penn Quakers, 16 to 6, before a homecoming crowd of 30,751 at Michigan Stadium. Penn had won its prior two games by a combined score of 101 to 0, and Michigan's victory was considered "an outstanding upset." Michigan led 13 to 0 at halftime. William Renner threw a three-yard touchdown pass to Arthur Valpey in the first quarter, and Cedric Sweet ran 18 yards for a touchdown in the second quarter. Steve Remnias kicked an extra point. Bill Kurlish scored for Penn in the fourth quarter, and Johnny Viergever added a field goal for Michigan.

=== At Illinois ===
Week 6: Michigan at Illinois

Team	1	2	3	4	Total
Michigan	0	0	0	0	0
• Illinois	0	3	0	0	3

- Date: November 9
- Location: Memorial Stadium
  Champaign, IL

On November 9, 1935, Michigan lost to Robert Zuppke's Illinois Fighting Illini, 3 to 0, before a homecoming crowd of 28,136 at a rainy Memorial Stadium in Champaign, Illinois. In a low-scoring match, Lowell Spurgeon kicked a 22-yard field goal for Illinois in the second quarter. Michigan's offense was stifled by the Illinois defense. The Wolverines gained only 10 yards of total offense and secured only one first down, that one coming on an Illinois penalty for running into the punter in the third quarter. Michigan threw only two forward passes, with either one or both of them resulting in an interception.

=== Minnesota ===
Week 7: Minnesota at Michigan

Team	1	2	3	4	Total
• Minnesota	20	7	7	6	40
Michigan	0	0	0	0	0

- Date: November 16
- Location: Michigan Stadium
- Game attendance: 32,029
- Referee: Masker

On November 16, 1935, Michigan lost to Bernie Bierman's Minnesota Golden Gophers, 40–0, before a crowd of 32,029 at Michigan Stadium. It was Minnesota's 23rd consecutive game without a loss and the worst defeat in the history of the Michigan football program since a 44–0 loss to Cornell in 1892. Minnesota gained 432 rushing yards to 99 for Michigan and also held Michigan to 35 passing yards. Clarence Thompson returned a kickoff 85 yards for a touchdown. Andrew Uram scored two touchdowns on runs of 60 and 73 yards. Sheldon Beise also scored two touchdowns. Vernal LeVoir scored on a 30-yard touchdown reception and kicked four extra points.

=== Ohio State ===
Week 8: Ohio State at Michigan

Team	1	2	3	4	Total
• Ohio State	13	6	6	13	38
Michigan	0	0	0	0	0

- Date: November 23
- Location: Michigan Stadium
- Game attendance: 53,322
- Referee: Lourie

On November 23, 1935, Michigan lost to Francis Schmidt's Ohio State Buckeyes, 38-0, before a crowd of 53,322 at Michigan Stadium. It remains the worst defeat for a Michigan team in the history of the Michigan–Ohio State football rivalry. Michigan was held to 12 rushing yards and 73 passing yards. Richard Heekin scored two touchdowns for Ohio State. Tippy Dye returned a punt 65 yards for a touchdown. Johnny Bettridge and Frank Boucher also scored touchdowns for Ohio State. Ohio State finished the season tied with Minnesota for the Big Ten championship and ranked No. 5 in the final AP Poll.

== Players ==
=== Varsity letter winners ===
The following 26 players received varsity letters for their participation on the 1935 Michigan football team. Players who started at least four games are shown in bold. For players who were starters, the list also includes the number of games started by position.

- Vincent J. Aug, halfback, junior, Cincinnati, Ohio
- Bill Barclay, halfback, sophomore, Flint, Michigan
- **Frank S. Bissell**, guard, junior, Hyannisport, Massachusetts - started 7 games at left guard, 1 game at right guard
- Robert D. Campbell, halfback, junior, Ionia, Michigan - started 1 game at left halfback
- **Chris Everhardus**, halfback, junior, Kalamazoo, Michigan - started 5 games at left halfback
- Jesse G. Garber, guard, junior, New York, New York - started 1 game at right guard
- Cloyce E. Hanshue, guard, junior, Kalamazoo, Michigan - started 2 games at right tackle
- Ernest C. Johnson, end, senior, Grand Rapids, Michigan - started 1 game at right end
- **Melvin G. Kramer**, tackle, sophomore, Toledo, Ohio - started 6 games at right tackle
- James H. Lincoln, tackle, sophomore, Harbor Beach, Michigan
- Earle B. Luby, tackle, sophomore, Chicago, Illinois - started 1 game at left tackle
- Earl J. Meyers, halfback, junior, Detroit, Michigan - started 1 game at right guard
- **Matt Patanelli**, end, junior, Elkhart, Indiana - started 8 games at left end
- Ernest A. Pederson, guard, junior, Grand Blanc, Michigan
- Steve Remias, fullback, senior, Chicago, Illinois - started 1 game at fullback
- **William Renner**, quarterback, senior, Youngstown, Ohio - started 8 games at quarterback
- Joe Rinaldi, center, sophomore, Elkhart, Indiana - started 1 game at center
- Stark Ritchie, halfback, sophomore, Battle Creek, Michigan - started 2 games at left halfback
- **Michael Savage**, end, senior, Dearborn, Michigan - started 5 games at right end
- Stanton J. Schuman, center, junior, Winnetka, Illinois - started 1 game at left guard, 1 game at right guard
- **John A. Smithers**, halfback, sophomore, Elkhart, Indiana - started 8 games at right halfback
- Solomon Sobsey, end, sophomore, Brooklyn, New York - started 3 games at right guard
- **Cedric Sweet**, fullback, junior, Fremont, Michigan - started 7 games at fullback
- Arthur Valpey, end, sophomore, Detroit, Michigan - 2 games at right end
- **John D. Viergever**, tackle, senior, Algonac, Michigan - started 7 games at left tackle
- **Harry T. Wright**, center, junior, Mt. Clemens, Michigan - started 6 games at center

=== Varsity reserves ===
The following six players were identified as varsity reserves on the roster of the 1935 Michigan football team.

- Robert Y. Amrine - started 1 game at center
- Joseph O. Ellis, halfback, junior, Eagle River, Wisconsin
- Charles Gray, quarterback, sophomore, Lombard, Illinois
- Winfred Nelson, halfback, senior, Greenville, Michigan
- Chester C. Stabovitz, end, junior, Chicago, Illinois
- Frederick C. Ziem, guard, sophomore, Pontiac, Michigan - started 1 game at right guard

=== Scoring leaders ===
Player	Touchdowns	Extra points	Field goals	Points
Chris Everhardus	2	1	0	13
Johnny Smithers	2	0	0	12
Cedric Sweet	2	0	0	12
Ernest Johnson	1	0	0	6
Matt Patanelli	1	0	0	6
Mike Savage	1	0	0	6
Arthur Valpey	1	0	0	6
Johnny Viergever	0	2	1	5
Steve Remias	0	2	0	2
**Totals**	**10**	**5**	**1**	**68**

== Awards and honors ==
- Captain: William Renner
- All-Conference: Matt Patanelli
- Most Valuable Player: William Renner
- Meyer Morton Award: Bob Cooper

== Coaching staff ==
- Head coach: Harry Kipke
- Assistant coaches: William Borgmann, Franklin Cappon, Ray Courtright, Ray Fisher, Cliff Keen, Bennie Oosterbaan, Carl Savage, Wally Weber
- Trainer: Ray Roberts
- Manager: Daniel F. Hulgrave, William Bates (assistant), Robert Weisert (assistant), Herbert Seegal (assistant), John Becker (assistant)
