= 1935 All-Big Ten Conference football team =

American college football all-star team

The 1935 All-Big Ten Conference football team consists of American football players selected to the All-Big Ten Conference teams chosen by various selectors for the 1935 Big Ten Conference football season.

== All Big-Ten selections ==
=== Ends ===
- Merle Wendt, Ohio State (AP-1, MJ-1, NEA-1, UP-1)
- Matt Patanelli, Michigan (MJ-1, NEA-2, UP-1)
- Henry W. Longfellow, Northwestern (AP-1, MJ-2, UP-2)
- Trevor J. Rees, Ohio State (NEA-1)
- Frank Loebs, Purdue (MJ-2, UP-2)
- Bob Lannon, Iowa (NEA-2)
- Dwight T. Reed, Minnesota (NEA-3)
- Ray Wallace King, Minnesota (NEA-3)

=== Tackles ===
- Ed Widseth, Minnesota (AP-1, MJ-1, NEA-1, UP-1)
- Dick Smith, Minnesota (AP-1, MJ-1, NEA-1, UP-1)
- Charley Hamrick, Ohio State (UP-2)
- Merritt Bush, Chicago (UP-2)
- Chuck Galbreath, Illinois (NEA-2)
- Art Lewis, Ohio (NEA-2)
- Bob Peeples, Marquette (NEA-3)
- Gilbert Harre, Ohio State (MJ-2)
- John Golemgeske, Wisconsin (MJ-2)

=== Guards ===
- Paul Tangora, Northwestern (AP-1, MJ-1, UP-1)
- Charles Wilkinson, Minnesota (AP-1, MJ-2, NEA-1, UP-2 [tackle])
- Ed Gryboski, Illinois (MJ-1, NEA-2, UP-1)
- Sid Wagner, Michigan State (NEA-1)
- Vern Oech, Minnesota (NEA-2)
- Jim Karcher, Ohio State (MJ-2, UP-2)

=== Centers ===
- Gomer Jones, Ohio State (AP-1, MJ-1, NEA-3, UP-1)
- Ted Osmaloski, Iowa (NEA-1)
- Dale H. Rennebohm, Minnesota (MJ-2, NEA-2, UP-2)

=== Quarterbacks ===
- Babe LeVoir, Minnesota (AP-1, MJ-1, NEA-2, UP-1)
- Stan Pincura, Ohio State (MJ-2, UP-2)
- Cecil Isbell, Iowa (NEA-3)

=== Halfbacks ===
- Jay Berwanger, Chicago (AP-1, MJ-1, NEA-1 [quarterback], UP-1)
- Ozzie Simmons, Iowa (AP-1, MJ-1, NEA-1 [fullback], UP-1)
- Andy Pilney, Notre Dame (NEA-1)
- Don Heap, Northwestern (NEA-3, UP-2)
- Wally Cruice, Northwestern (UP-2)
- Ray Buivid, Marquette (NEA-2)
- Dick Heekin, Ohio State (NEA-3)

=== Fullbacks ===
- Sheldon Beise, Minnesota (AP-1, MJ-1, NEA-1 [halfback], UP-1)
- Dick Crayne, Iowa (MJ-2 [halfback], NEA-2 [halfback], UP-2)
- George E. Roscoe, Minnesota (MJ-2 [halfback], NEA-2)
- Eddie Jankowski, Wisconsin (MJ-2, NEA-3)

== Key ==
Italics = Player chosen from a team that was not a member of the conference during the 1935 season

Bold = Consensus first-team selection by majority of selectors

AP = Associated Press

MJ = The Milwaukee Journal

NEA = Newspaper Enterprise Association, selected by NEA sports editor Harry Grayson

UP = United Press

== See also ==
- 1935 College Football All-America Team
