= 1935 Wisconsin Badgers football team =

American college football season

1935 Wisconsin Badgers football
- Conference: Big Ten Conference
- Record: 1–7 (1–4 Big Ten)
- Head coach: Clarence Spears (4th season)
- MVP: Eddie Jankowski
- Captain: Ray Davis
- Home stadium: Camp Randall Stadium

1935 Big Ten Conference football standings
	Conf.					Overall
Team	W		L		T	W		L		T
No. 1 Minnesota +	5	–	0	–	0	8	–	0	–	0
No. 5 Ohio State +	5	–	0	–	0	7	–	1	–	0
Purdue	3	–	3	–	0	4	–	4	–	0
Indiana	2	–	2	–	1	4	–	3	–	1
No. 16 Northwestern	2	–	3	–	1	4	–	3	–	1
No. 18 Iowa	1	–	2	–	2	4	–	2	–	2
Chicago	2	–	3	–	0	4	–	4	–	0
Michigan	2	–	3	–	0	4	–	4	–	0
Illinois	1	–	4	–	0	3	–	5	–	0
Wisconsin	1	–	4	–	0	1	–	7	–	0
+ – Conference co-champions; Rankings from United Press

The 1935 Wisconsin Badgers football team was an American football team that represented the University of Wisconsin in the 1935 Big Ten Conference football season. The team compiled a 1–7 record (1–4 against conference opponents) and finished in a tie for ninth place in the Big Ten Conference. Clarence Spears was in his fourth and final year as Wisconsin's head coach. This was the first time since 1918 that the Badgers lost their opening game of the season.

Fullback Eddie Jankowski was selected as the team's most valuable player. Ray Davis was the team captain.

The team played its home games at Camp Randall Stadium, which had a capacity of 32,700. During the 1935 season, the average attendance at home games was 15,889.

== Schedule ==
Date	Opponent	Site	Result	Attendance	Source
September 28	South Dakota State*	Camp Randall Stadium; Madison, WI	L 6–13	13,000	
October 5	Marquette*	Camp Randall Stadium; Madison, WI	L 0–33	19,000	
October 12	Notre Dame*	Camp Randall Stadium; Madison, WI	L 0–27	19,863	
October 19	Michigan	Camp Randall Stadium; Madison, WI	L 12–20	14,381	
October 26	at Chicago	Stagg Field; Chicago, IL	L 7–13		
November 9	Purdue^{†}	Camp Randall Stadium; Madison, WI	W 8–0	16,595	
November 16	at Northwestern	Dyche Stadium; Evanston, IL	L 13–32	20,000	
November 23	at Minnesota	Memorial Stadium; Minneapolis, MN (rivalry)	L 7–33	45,000	
*Non-conference game; ^{†}Homecoming; Source:
