= 1935 Ohio State Buckeyes football team =

American college football season

1935 Ohio State Buckeyes football

Big Ten co-champion
- Conference: Big Ten Conference
- Record: 7–1 (5–0 Big Ten)
- Head coach: Francis Schmidt (2nd season)
- Home stadium: Ohio Stadium

1935 Big Ten Conference football standings
	Conf.					Overall
Team	W		L		T	W		L		T
No. 1 Minnesota +	5	–	0	–	0	8	–	0	–	0
No. 5 Ohio State +	5	–	0	–	0	7	–	1	–	0
Purdue	3	–	3	–	0	4	–	4	–	0
Indiana	2	–	2	–	1	4	–	3	–	1
No. 16 Northwestern	2	–	3	–	1	4	–	3	–	1
No. 18 Iowa	1	–	2	–	2	4	–	2	–	2
Chicago	2	–	3	–	0	4	–	4	–	0
Michigan	2	–	3	–	0	4	–	4	–	0
Illinois	1	–	4	–	0	3	–	5	–	0
Wisconsin	1	–	4	–	0	1	–	7	–	0
+ – Conference co-champions; Rankings from United Press

The 1935 Ohio State Buckeyes football team represented Ohio State University in the 1935 college football season. The Buckeyes compiled a 7–1 record with a 5–0 mark in Big Ten Conference play. Ohio State won their first Big Ten title in 15 years, outscoring opponents 237–57.

On November 23, 1935, Ohio State defeated Michigan, 38-0, at Michigan Stadium. It remains the worst defeat for a Michigan team in the history of the Michigan–Ohio State football rivalry. Michigan was held to 12 rushing yards and 73 passing yards. Richard Heekin scored two touchdowns for Ohio State. Tippy Dye returned a punt 65 yards for a touchdown. Johnny Bettridge and Frank Boucher also scored touchdowns for the Buckeyes.

== Schedule ==
Date	Opponent	Site	Result	Attendance	Source
October 5	Kentucky*	Ohio Stadium; Columbus, OH	W 19–6	56,686	
October 12	Drake*	Ohio Stadium; Columbus, OH	W 85–7	28,927	
October 19	Northwestern	Ohio Stadium; Columbus, OH	W 28–7	42,335	
October 26	at Indiana	Memorial Stadium; Bloomington, IN	W 28–6	15,000	
November 2	Notre Dame*	Ohio Stadium; Columbus, OH	L 13–18	81,018	
November 9	at Chicago	Stagg Field; Chicago, IL	W 20–13	15,000	
November 16	Illinois	Ohio Stadium; Columbus, OH (Illibuck)	W 6–0	43,921	
November 23	at Michigan	Michigan Stadium; Ann Arbor, MI (rivalry)	W 38–0	53,322	
*Non-conference game

== Coaching staff ==
- Francis Schmidt, head coach, second year
- Gaylord Stinchcomb, backfield coach, first year

== 1936 NFL draftees ==
Player	Round	Pick	Position	NFL club
Gomer Jones	2	15	Center	Chicago Cardinals
Dick Heekin	8	72	Back	New York Giants
