= Dick Smith (tackle) =

American football player

Profile
- Position: Tackle

Personal information
- Born: c. 1915; Rockford, Illinois, U.S.
- Died: c. 2000; Arizona, U.S.

Career information
- College: Minnesota
- NFL draft: 1936: 7th round, 60 (by the Chicago Bears)th overall pick

Awards and highlights
- 2× National champion (1934, 1935); First-team All-American (1935); First-team All-Big Ten (1935)

Richard Smith was an All-American football player for the University of Minnesota in the mid-1930s. During Smith's three years as a starter at tackle, the Golden Gophers did not lose a game.

== Biography ==
A native of Rockford, Illinois, Smith played for Bernie Bierman's great Golden Gophers teams of 1933, 1934, and 1935. The Golden Gophers were undefeated during Smith's three seasons starting at the tackle position. Their year-by-year record was as follows:

- 1933: 4-0-4
- 1934: 8-0
- 1935: 8-0

As a sophomore, Smith was one of the "surprise" players of the 1933 season. A Minnesota newspaper in 1934 described Smith's progression as follows:

"Dick Smith was a big 200 pound youth who appeared somewhat slow and green as a freshman. He was not particularly impressive in his early sophomore games last year either but suddenly he seemed to hit a stride and the name 'Smith, left tackle,' appeared in the Gopher lineup from that time on. The Michigan game was his best, of the season and he'll be back September 15, ready to try for his position again."

Smith was one of the anchors of the 1934 and 1935 teams that compiled perfect, undefeated records and were recognized as national champions. Both of Minnesota's tackles in 1935 were All-Americans. In addition to Smith, Ed Widseth played tackle for the 1935 team and was a consensus All-American. The 1935 Golden Gophers, with Smith and Widseth in the line, finished the season undefeated and defeated 40-0 and Wisconsin, 33-7. The United Press in 1935 wrote that Smith and Widseth formed the backbone of one of America's greatest teams."

As a senior in 1935, Smith was selected as a first-team All-American by the Associated Press, United Press, Collier's Weekly, the Newspaper Editors Association ("NEA"), the International News Service, and the New York Sun. Smith was also chosen to play in both of college football's post-season All-Star games. In December 1935, he was picked as one of the Eastern All-Stars to play in the East-West Shrine Game in San Francisco. And in July 1936, he was voted by fans as a starting tackle for the College All-Stars in the annual game between the college stars and the NFL championship team—the 1935 Detroit Lions. In selecting Smith as an All-American, the NEA noted that Smith charged fast, had good speed down the field, and was a help to Minnesota's ends due to his speed. Associated Press sports editor Alan Gould also cited Smith's combination of size and speed in picking him as an AP All-American: "Dick Smith, a 218-pounder with rare speed in Minnesota's forward ranks get the call." He was drafted in the seventh round of the 1936 NFL Draft. Smith never signed with an NFL team, and later moved to Arizona to be a "businessman-rancher".

== See also ==
- 1935 College Football All-America Team
