= Osborne Helveston =

American football player (1913–1961)

- Osborne Helveston, 1935

Profile
- Position: Guard

Personal information
- Born: December 5, 1913; Ocean Springs, Mississippi, U.S.
- Died: September 2, 1961 (age 47); Zachary, Louisiana, U.S.

Career information
- College: Louisiana State University

Awards and highlights
- First-team All-American (1935)

Osborne Milsted "Butch" Helveston Sr. (December 5, 1913 – September 2, 1961), sometimes listed as Osborn Helveston, was an American football player.

== Biography ==
Helveston was born in Ocean Springs, Mississippi, in 1913. He graduated from Biloxi High School in 1932.

He attended Louisiana State University and played college football at the guard position for the LSU Tigers football team. He was selected by the Central Press Association as a first-team guard on the 1935 All-America college football team. He graduated from LSU in 1936.

After graduating from LSU, Helveston served as a coach and principal at Baton Rouge High School. He began as assistant coach and was promoted to head coach in 1938. He was later the personnel director for the Baton Rouge school system. He died in September 1961 at age 47 after suffering a heart attack at his family camp near Baton Rouge. He was posthumously inducted into the Louisiana State University Athletic Hall of Fame in 1976.
