= 1935 Iowa Hawkeyes football team =

American college football season

1935 Iowa Hawkeyes football
- Conference: Big Ten Conference
- Record: 4–2–2 (1–2–2 Big Ten)
- Head coach: Ossie Solem (4th season)
- MVP: Richard Crayne
- Captain: Richard Crayne
- Home stadium: Iowa Stadium

1935 Big Ten Conference football standings
	Conf.					Overall
Team	W		L		T	W		L		T
No. 1 Minnesota +	5	–	0	–	0	8	–	0	–	0
No. 5 Ohio State +	5	–	0	–	0	7	–	1	–	0
Purdue	3	–	3	–	0	4	–	4	–	0
Indiana	2	–	2	–	1	4	–	3	–	1
No. 16 Northwestern	2	–	3	–	1	4	–	3	–	1
No. 18 Iowa	1	–	2	–	2	4	–	2	–	2
Chicago	2	–	3	–	0	4	–	4	–	0
Michigan	2	–	3	–	0	4	–	4	–	0
Illinois	1	–	4	–	0	3	–	5	–	0
Wisconsin	1	–	4	–	0	1	–	7	–	0
+ – Conference co-champions; Rankings from United Press

The 1935 Iowa Hawkeyes football team was an American football team that represented the University of Iowa as a member of the Big Ten Conference during the 1935 Big Ten football season. In their fourth season under head coach Ossie Solem, the Hawkeyes compiled a 4–2–2 record (1–2–2 in conference games), finished in sixth place in the Big Ten, and outscored opponents by a total of 122 to 39.

This season was the first time Iowa played Minnesota for the Floyd of Rosedale trophy.

The team played its home games at Iowa Stadium (later renamed Kinnick Stadium) in Iowa City, Iowa.

== Schedule ==
Date	Opponent	Site	Result	Attendance	Source
September 28	Bradley Tech*	Iowa Stadium; Iowa City, IA	W 26–0		
October 5	South Dakota*	Iowa Stadium; Iowa City, IA	W 47–2		
October 12	Colgate*	Iowa Stadium; Iowa City, IA	W 12–6		
October 26	at Illinois	Memorial Stadium; Champaign, IL	W 19–0	26,647	
November 2	Indiana	Iowa Stadium; Iowa City, IA	T 6–6		
November 9	Minnesota^{†}	Iowa Stadium; Iowa City, IA (rivalry)	L 6–13	52,000	
November 16	at Purdue	Ross–Ade Stadium; West Lafayette, IN	L 6–12	16,000	
November 23	Northwestern	Dyche Stadium; Evanston, IL	T 0–0	30,000	
*Non-conference game; ^{†}Homecoming
