= 1935 Purdue Boilermakers football team =

American college football season

1935 Purdue Boilermakers football
- Conference: Big Ten Conference
- Record: 4–4 (3–3 Big Ten)
- Head coach: Noble Kizer (6th season)
- Captain: Ed Skoronski
- Home stadium: Ross–Ade Stadium

1935 Big Ten Conference football standings
	Conf.					Overall
Team	W		L		T	W		L		T
No. 1 Minnesota +	5	–	0	–	0	8	–	0	–	0
No. 5 Ohio State +	5	–	0	–	0	7	–	1	–	0
Purdue	3	–	3	–	0	4	–	4	–	0
Indiana	2	–	2	–	1	4	–	3	–	1
No. 16 Northwestern	2	–	3	–	1	4	–	3	–	1
No. 18 Iowa	1	–	2	–	2	4	–	2	–	2
Chicago	2	–	3	–	0	4	–	4	–	0
Michigan	2	–	3	–	0	4	–	4	–	0
Illinois	1	–	4	–	0	3	–	5	–	0
Wisconsin	1	–	4	–	0	1	–	7	–	0
+ – Conference co-champions; Rankings from United Press

The 1935 Purdue Boilermakers football team was an American football team that represented Purdue University during the 1935 college football season. In their sixth season under head coach Noble Kizer, the Boilermakers compiled a 4–4 record, finished in third place in the Big Ten Conference with a 3–3 record against conference opponents, and outscored opponents by a total of 65 to 57. Ed Skoronski was the team captain.

== Schedule ==
Date	Opponent	Site	Result	Attendance	Source
October 5	at Northwestern	Dyche Stadium; Evanston, IL	W 7–0	30,000	
October 12	at Fordham*	Polo Grounds; New York, NY	W 20–0	35,000	
October 19	at Chicago	Stagg Field; Chicago, IL (rivalry)	W 19–0	25,000	
October 26	Carnegie Tech^{†}*	Ross–Ade Stadium; West Lafayette, IN	L 0–7	17,000	
November 2	at Minnesota	Memorial Stadium; Minneapolis, MN	L 7–29	49,000	
November 9	at Wisconsin	Camp Randall Stadium; Madison, WI	L 0–8	16,595	
November 16	Iowa	Ross–Ade Stadium; West Lafayette, IN	W 12–6	16,000	
November 23	at Indiana	Memorial Stadium; Bloomington, IN (Old Oaken Bucket)	L 0–7	25,000	
*Non-conference game; ^{†}Homecoming

== Roster ==
- Ray Abbott, E
- George Bell, C
- Elmer Blume, T
- Forrest Burmeister, G-T
- Carl Dahlbeck, G
- Leon Dailey, HB
- Lowell Decker, FB-HB
- George Dennis, T-G
- Johnny Drake, FB
- Hewitt East, HB
- Ted Fehring, T
- Wayne Gift, QB
- Lee Graves, G
- Howard Guirl, E
- Cecil Isbell, HB
- Cody Isbell, E-C-HB
- Frank Loebs, E
- Tom McGannon, HB
- Ben Medley, HB-QB
- Donald Powell, E
- Colby Reed, FB-E
- Dick Sandefur, FB
- Wayne Sandefur, G-T-K
- Martin Schreyer, C-T
- Robert Selby, HB
- Ed Skoronski, C
- Fred Stalcup, QB-HB
- Robert Vaughan, HB
- Fred Voss, G
- Frederick Wahl
- Clem Woltman, T
- Charles Wright, HB
