= 1935 All-America college football team =

Official list of the best college football players of 1935

The 1935 All-America college football team is composed of college football players who were selected as All-Americans by various organizations and writers that chose All-America college football teams in 1935. The nine selectors recognized by the NCAA as "official" for the 1935 season are (1) Collier's Weekly, as selected by Grantland Rice, (2) the Associated Press (AP), (3) the United Press (UP), (4) the All-America Board (AAB), (5) the International News Service (INS), (6) Liberty magazine, (7) the Newspaper Enterprise Association (NEA), (8) the North American Newspaper Alliance (NANA), and (9) the Sporting News (SN).

Jay Berwanger of Chicago was one of two unanimous All-American selections. Berwanger was also the first recipient of the Heisman Trophy and the first player selected in the first NFL draft.

Bobby Grayson of Stanford was the other unanimous All-American. He was one of Stanford's "Vow Boys," a group of freshmen players who vowed after a 1932 loss to the University of Southern California that they would never lose to the Trojans when they made the varsity team. The group kept their promise, defeating USC three straight years and becoming the first team in college football history to play in three consecutive Rose Bowl games. Other "Vow Boys" who made the 1935 All-American team include Monk Moscrip and Bob Reynolds.

Bob Wilson of SMU received eight official first-team designations, and Jac Weller of Princeton received seven. The 1935 All-Americans also included two players who went on to Hall of Fame careers as coaches. Bear Bryant was named a third-team All-American at the end position by the NEA, and Bud Wilkinson of the University of Minnesota was named a second-team All-American by the UP and a third-team selection by the NEA and the Central Press Association.

== Consensus All-Americans ==
For the year 1935, the NCAA recognizes nine published All-American teams as "official" designations for purposes of its consensus determinations. The following chart identifies the NCAA-recognized consensus All-Americans and displays which first-team designations they received.

Name	Position	School	Number	Official	Other
Jay Berwanger	Halfback	Chicago	9/9	AAB, AP, COL, INS, LIB, NANA, NEA, SN, UP	CNS, CP, KCS, NYS, PTH, WC
Bobby Grayson	Fullback	Stanford	9/9	AAB, AP, COL, INS, LIB, NANA, NEA, SN, UP	CNS, CP, KCS, PTH
Bob Wilson	Halfback	SMU	8/9	AP, COL, INS, LIB, NANA, NEA, SN, UP	CNS, CP, NYS, PTH
Jac Weller	Guard	Princeton	7/9	AP, COL, INS, LIB, NANA, NEA, UP	CNS, CP, KCS, NYS, PTH
Ed Widseth	Tackle	Minnesota	6/9	AAB, INS, LIB, NANA, SN, UP	CNS, CP, KCS, SN
Gaynell Tinsley	End	LSU	6/9	AP, COL, INS, LIB, NEA, UP	CNS, NYS, PTH
Darrell Lester	Center	TCU	6/9	AAB, AP, COL, INS, NEA, SN	CNS, PTH, WC
Monk Moscrip	End	Stanford	5/9	AAB, COL, INS, NANA, SN	CNS, CP, KCS, PTH, WC
Riley Smith	Quarterback	Alabama	5/9	AAB, AP, COL, INS, NEA	CNS, NYS, WC
Dick Smith	Tackle	Minnesota	5/9	AP, COL, INS, NEA, UP	NYS, PTH
Wayne Millner	End	Notre Dame	4/9	AAB, NANA, SN, UP	CP, NYS, WC
Gomer Jones	Center	Ohio State	4/9	AAB, LIB, NANA, UP	CP, KCS, WC
Larry Lutz	Tackle	California	4/9	AAB, AP, NANA, SN	CNS, CP, WC
J. C. Wetsel	Guard	SMU	3/9	AAB, NANA, SN	CNS, KCS, WC
Sid Wagner	Guard	Michigan State	2/9	LIB, UP	NYS

== All-American selections for 1935 ==
=== Ends ===
- Gaynell Tinsley, LSU (College Football Hall of Fame) (AP-1; UP-1; LIB-1; COL-1; NEA-1; INS-1; NANA-2; CP-3; NYS-1; PTH-1; CNS-1)
- Wayne Millner, Notre Dame (College and Pro Football Hall of Fame) (AP-3; UP-1; AAB-1; LIB-2; NANA-1; CP-1; NYS-1; WC-1; SN; CNS-2; KCS-2)
- Jim Moscrip, Stanford (College Football Hall of Fame) (AP-3; UP-2; AAB-1; LIB-2; COL-1; NEA-2; INS-1; NANA-1; CP-1; WC-1; SN; PTH-1; CNS-1; KCS-1)
- Merle Wendt, Ohio State (UP-2; LIB-1; NEA-1; NANA-2; CP-2)
- William R. Shuler, Army (AP-1; CP-2)
- Gilbert Lea, Princeton (AP-2; NYS-2; CNS-2; KCS-1)
- Walter Winika, Rutgers (AP-2; LIB-3)
- Rutherford B. Hayes, Kansas (NEA-2)
- Bob "Choo-Choo" Train, Yale (NYS-2)
- Bernie Scherer, Nebraska (UP-3; CP-3)
- Bear Bryant, Alabama (NEA-3)
- Maco Stewart, SMU (NEA-3)
- Jack Brittingham, California (UP-3; LIB-3)
- Keith Topping, Stanford (KCS-2)

=== Tackles ===
- Ed Widseth, Minnesota (College Football Hall of Fame) (AP-2; UP-1; AAB-1; LIB-1; NEA-2; INS-1; NANA-1; CP-1; NYS-2; WC-1; SN; CNS-1; KCS-1)
- Larry Lutz, California (AP-1; UP-2; AAB-1; LIB-2; NANA-1; CP-1; WC-1; SN; CNS-1; KCS-2)
- Dick Smith, Minnesota (AP-1; UP-1; LIB-3; COL-1; NEA-1; INS-1; NYS-1; PTH-1; CNS-2)
- Charles Wasicek, Colgate (UP-2; LIB-1; NANA-2; CP-2; NYS-2)
- Truman Spain, SMU (AP-2; UP-3; COL-1; NEA-3; CP-3; PTH-1; CNS-2; KCS-2)
- Art Detzel, Pittsburgh (NEA-1)
- Bob Reynolds, Stanford (College Football Hall of Fame) (NANA-2; CP-2; NYS-1; KCS-1)
- Jim Whatley, Alabama (NEA-2)
- Haygood Paterson, Auburn (AP-3; LIB-2)
- Charles Toll, Princeton (AP-3)
- Joe Stydahar, West Virginia (NEA-3)
- Al Duvall, Loyola, Los Angeles (UP-3; LIB-3)
- Charles Galbreath, Illinois (CP-3)

=== Guards ===
- Jac Weller, Princeton (AP-1; UP-1; LIB-1; COL-1; NEA-1; INS-1; NANA-1; CP-1; NYS-1; PTH-1; CNS-1; KCS-1)
- Sid Wagner, Michigan State (8th pick in the 1936 NFL Draft, by Detroit)(AP-2; UP-1; LIB-1; NYS-1)
- J. C. Wetsel, SMU (AAB-1; LIB-3; NANA-1; CP-2; NYS-2; WC-1; SN; CNS-1; KCS-1)
- Paul Tangora, Northwestern (AP-1; UP-3; LIB-2; NANA-2; CP-2; SN; CNS-2; KCS-2)
- Ed Michaels, Villanova (AP-2; UP-2; LIB-2; INS-1; NYS-2; CNS-2)
- J. W. "Dub" Wheeler, Oklahoma (NEA-1)
- Inwood Smith, Ohio State (COL-1; PTH-1)
- Osborne Helveston, LSU (CP-1)
- Bud Wilkinson, Minnesota (College Football Hall of Fame) (UP-2; NEA-3; CP-3; KCS-2)
- Marty Kordick, St. Mary's (NEA-2)
- Ike Hayes, Iowa State (NEA-2)
- Alex Drobnitch, Denver (AP-3; UP-3; LIB-3; CP-3)
- Phil Flanagan, Holy Cross (AP-3)
- Cotton Harrison, TCU (NEA-3)
- Edward Gryboski, Illinois (NANA-2)

=== Centers ===
- Darrell Lester, TCU (College Football Hall of Fame) (AP-1; UP-3; AAB-1 [g]; LIB-2; COL-1; NEA-1; INS-1; NANA-2; CP-2; WC-1 [g]; SN; PTH-1; CNS-1; KCS-2)
- Gomer Jones, Ohio State (College Football Hall of Fame) (AP-2; UP-1; AAB-1; LIB-1; NANA-1; CP-1; NYS-2; WC-1; CNS-2; KCS-1)
- Steve Sabol, North Carolina State (AP-3; NEA-2)
- Sherman Chavoor, UCLA (NEA-3)
- Louis Robertshaw, Navy (CP-3)
- Walter Gilbert, Auburn (College Football Hall of Fame) (UP-2; LIB-3; NYS-1)

=== Quarterbacks ===
- Riley Smith, Alabama (College Football Hall of Fame) (second pick in the 1936 NFL draft) (AP-1; UP-2; AAB-1; LIB-2; COL-1; NEA-1; INS-1; NANA-2; CP-2; NYS-1; WC-1; CNS-1; KCS-2)
- Sammy Baugh, TCU (College and Pro football Hall of Fame) (AP-3; UP-1; LIB-3; NANA-2 [fb]; CP-2 [hb]; NYS-2; PTH-1; CNS-2; KCS-1)
- Ed Goddard, Washington State (Second pick in 1937 NFL draft) (LIB-1)
- Kenneth Sandbach, Princeton (NEA-3; CP-3)
- Ace Parker, Duke (AP-3 [hb]; UP-3; LIB-3 [hb]; NEA-2)

=== Halfbacks ===
- Jay Berwanger, Chicago (College Football Hall of Fame)(AP-1; UP-1; AAB-1; LIB-1; COL-1; NEA-1; INS-1; NANA-1; CP-1; NYS-1; WC-1; SN; PTH-1; CNS-1; KCS-1)
- Bob Wilson, SMU (AP-1; UP-1; LIB-1; COL-1; NEA-1; INS-1; NANA-1; CP-1; NYS-1; SN; PTH-1; CNS-1)
- Ozzie Simmons, Iowa (AP-2; LIB-2; NEA-2; NANA-2; CP-2; SN; CNS-2; KCS-2)
- Charles R. Meyer, Army (UP-2; NANA-2; CP-3)
- Ray Buivid, Marquette (UP-3; LIB-3; CP-3)
- Jesse Fatherree, LSU (NEA-3)
- Hubert Randour, Pittsburgh (UP-3)
- Chuck Cheshire, UCLA (NEA-3)
- Andy Pilney, Notre Dame (NEA-3)
- Bill Wallace, Rice (AP-3)

=== Fullbacks ===
- Bobby Grayson, Stanford (College Football Hall of Fame) (AP-1; UP-1; AAB-1; LIB-1; COL-1; NEA-1; INS-1; NANA-1 [qb]; CP-1; NYS-2; WC-1; SN: PTH-1; CNS-1; KCS-1)
- William Shakespeare, Notre Dame (College Football Hall of Fame) (third pick in the 1936 NFL draft) (UP-2 [hb]; AAB-1 [hb]; CP-3; NYS-2 [hb]; WC-1; CNS-2 [hb]; KCS-1 [hb])
- Sheldon Beise, Minnesota (AP-2; UP-2; LIB-3; NEA-2; NANA-1; CP-1; NYS-2; CNS-2; KCS-2)
- John McCauley, Rice (AP-2 [qb]; LIB-2 [hb]; NYS-1)
- Donald Jackson, North Carolina (AP-2 [hb]; NEA-2; CP-2)
- Dick Crayne, Iowa (AP-3; UP-3; KCS-2 [hb])
- Abe Mickal, LSU (College Football Hall of Fame) (LIB-2)

== Key ==
Bold = Consensus All-American

- -1 – First-team selection
- -2 – Second-team selection
- -3 – Third-team selection

=== Official selectors ===
- AAB = All-America Board, selected by a board made up of Glenn "Pop" Warner, Christy Walsh, Elmer Layden, Howard Jones and Frank Thomas.
- AP = Associated Press
- COL = Collier's Weekly
- INS = International News Service: "Based upon the findings of staff men and qualified observers in all sections of the country, the International News Service today is making public its all-American football team for 1935"
- LIB = Liberty Magazine: "An 'All-Players' All-America football team compiled by Liberty Magazine from a poll of 1,521 varsity players in all parts of the country"
- NANA = North American Newspaper Alliance, selected by four prominent coaches: Andy Kerr of Colgate, Dan McGugin of Vanderbilt, James Phelan of Washington, and Gus Dorais of Detroit.
- NEA = Newspaper Editors Association, selected by Bernie Bierman and NEA Service's committee of coaches
- SN = The Sporting News
- UP = United Press

=== Other selectors ===
- CNS = Consensus All-American team based on the following scoring system: 5 points for a first-team selection; 3 points for a second-team selection; and 1 point for a third-team selection. The All-American teams reviewed for the consensus team were AP, UP, INS, NEA, North American Newspaper Alliance, All-America Board, Collier's, Bill Corum's symposium, and Fritz Crisler.
- CP = Central Press Association: "The sixth annual Central Press Captains' All-American football team is presented today. It represents the selections of 54 gridiron leaders from important schools in every part of the country. Every major conference had a voice in the voting, and captains of important teams not identified with conferences—such as Army and Navy—expressed their preferences in the nation-wide poll which has grown tremendously in popularity since its introduction in 1930."
- KCS = Kansas City Star by C.E. McBride
- NYS = New York Sun
- PTH = Pathé News, selected by a board of outstanding college coaches that included Bernie Bierman of Minnesota, Frank Thomas of Alabama, Claude E. Thornhill of Stanford and Lou Little of Columbia.
- WC = Walter Camp Football Foundation

== See also ==
- 1935 Little All-America college football team
- 1935 All-Big Six Conference football team
- 1935 All-Big Ten Conference football team
- 1935 All-Pacific Coast Conference football team
- 1935 All-SEC football team
- 1935 All-Southwest Conference football team
