= Larry Kelley =

American football player (1915–2000)

No. 19
- Position: End

Personal information
- Born: May 30, 1915; Conneaut, Ohio, U.S.
- Died: June 27, 2000 (aged 85); Hightstown, New Jersey, U.S.
- Listed height: 6 ft 2 in (1.88 m)
- Listed weight: 190 lb (86 kg)

Career information
- High school: Williamsport (Williamsport, Pennsylvania); Peddie (Hightstown, New Jersey)
- College: Yale (1934–1936)

Awards and highlights
- Heisman Trophy (1936); Unanimous All-American (1936); First-team All-Eastern (1936)
- College Football Hall of Fame (Class of 1969)

Lawrence Morgan Kelley (May 30, 1915 – June 27, 2000) was an American football end who played for the Yale Bulldogs football program from 1934 to 1936. He was the captain of the 1936 Yale Bulldogs football team that compiled a 7–1 record and was ranked No. 12 in the final AP Poll. He was selected as a unanimous first-team All-American and won the Heisman Trophy as the best player in college football.

Kelley rejected offers to play professional football, baseball, and basketball and instead became a high school teacher and coach. He was inducted into the College Football Hall of Fame in 1969. In 1999, he sold his Heisman Trophy at auction for $328,110. He died by suicide six months later at the age of 85.

== Early life ==
Kelley was born in Conneaut, Ohio, in 1915. He moved to Williamsport, Pennsylvania, at age 8 and attended Williamsport High School. His football coach at Williamsport told him that "the only way I would ever see a college team play would be to pay my way in." After graduating from Williamsport, he spent one year at the Peddie School, a preparatory school in Hightstown, New Jersey. He graduated from Peddie ranked first in his class.

== Yale ==
Kelley enrolled at Yale College in the fall of 1933. He received a scholarship to cover the $900 annual cost of attending the college. He played for Yale's baseball, basketball, and football teams. While at Yale, he was also a member of the Delta Kappa Epsilon fraternity and the Skull and Bones society.

As a sophomore in 1934, Kelley became a star for the Yale football team. Playing at end on both offense and defense, he played all 60 minutes in multiple games. On November 17, 1934, he caught the game-winning touchdown pass, covering 48 yards, in a 7–0 victory over Princeton. The loss ended Princeton's 15-game winning streak.

=== Reputation for humor ===
As a junior in 1935, Kelley gained attention for his pass receptions and his cocky and clever statements to the press. One of his most famous quips came after an opposing Princeton player came onto the field as a substitute and appeared confused as to who he was to replace. Kelley quipped to the referee, "Maybe that sub is in for me, sir. I've been playing in Princeton's backfield all afternoon." Noted newspaperman Damon Runyon described Kelley as a mirthful swashbuckler, always ready with a smart crack on the tip of his tongue, and "the most picturesque football player that Yale has had since Tom Shevlin." He became known as "The Great" Kelley (a name Kelley himself suggested) or "Laughing Larry".

=== 1936 season ===
Kelley was unanimously elected by his 25 fellow lettermen as captain of the 1936 Yale Bulldogs football team. He and Clint Frank led the 1936 Yale team to a 7–1 record and a No. 12 ranking in the final Associated Press poll. Kelley played all 60 minutes in six of the team's eight games. He missed only 15 minutes out of 480 for the season. (Over his three years playing for Yale, he was on the field for 1,298 out 1,500 minute played.)

The most famous play of Kelley's career occurred on October 17, 1936, against Navy. Navy was leading when a Midshipman fumbled the ball. Kelley kicked the loose ball between 20 and 40 yards (accounts differ as to how far the ball traveled), chased after ball, and recovered it inside Navy's five-yard line. Yale then scored the game-winning touchdown. At the time, Kelley insisted that the play was "absolutely accidental" and pointed out that doing so intentionally "would be one of the hardest to time." After the 1936 season, the NCAA changed the rules to prohibit kicking a loose ball and declare the ball dead at the spot of the impact.

The lone loss was to Dartmouth by an 11–7 score. In the final five seconds, Yale got a first down at Dartmouth's one-yard line, but failed to score on two chances. More than 50 years later, Kelley remained disappointed by the ending of the Dartmouth game.

Kelley tallied 17 receptions for 372 yards and six touchdowns in 1936. Allison Danzig of The New York Times wrote: "It is usually left to posterity properly to appreciate and bestow the accolade of lasting fame upon heroes of the day, but no player in our time has conclusively left the impress of his personality upon the public than has Kelley of Yale." Another newspaper account opined:

The thing that made (Mr. Kelley) a great athlete was his unusual coordination. His brain is a fire engine, and it drives the splendid chassis of his body smoothly. His reactions are instantaneous. A clear head on a football field is of little use unless the muscles are instantly obedient. He is always there with the sudden dash, the change of pace, the full steam ahead, when it is needed. Like all champions, he is able to do the right thing at the right moment.

At the end of the season, Kelley was a unanimous pick for the 1936 All-America team, receiving first-team selections from the All-America Board, Associated Press, United Press, Collier's Weekly, the Sporting News, and others. He is the only player in Yale football history to score a touchdown in every game he played against rivals Harvard and Princeton.

In three years at Yale, Kelley totaled 49 passes for 889 yards and 13 touchdowns. He scored three additional touchdowns on pass interceptions.

=== Heisman Trophy ===
On December 2, 1936, the Downtown Athletic Club announced that Kelley had won the Heisman Trophy as the year's best college football player Against competition that included Hall of Famers Sammy Baugh and Ace Parker, Kelley won the award in a landslide, receiving 213 points, more than quadruple the point total received by any other player.

Kelley was the first recipient of the award after it was named the "Heisman Trophy". The award was established in 1935 as the Downtown Athletic Club Trophy. It was renamed after John Heisman died in October 1936. Kelley recalled learning about the honor: "I got the telegram telling me that I had won it, and I didn't even know there was such a thing." Kelley was one of only two linemen (Leon Hart was the other) ever to win the Heisman Trophy.

Kelley later donated a replica of his Heisman Trophy to the Peddie School. He gave the replica to Peddie because "Peddie had the greatest influence on my life."

In December 1999, several months before his death, Kelley sold his Heisman Trophy at an auction. Kelley explained, "I wanted to right my affairs and my estate and take care of my 18 nieces and nephews." It sold for $328,110 to the owner of The Stadium Museum, Restaurant & Bar in Garrison, New York. The sales price was a record for a Heisman, surpassing the $230,000 that O. J. Simpson's Heisman earned at auction in February 1999.

== Rejection of pro sports and Hollywood ==
In December 1936, Kelley was selected by the Detroit Lions in the 1937 NFL draft. Kelly said he would not play professional football or baseball, despite receiving offers in both sports, including an $11,000 offer from the Lions. He also rejected an offer of $5,000 to play professional baseball for the St. Louis Cardinals of the Major League Baseball (MLB). Kelley said at the time: "I don't ever want to be known as a professional. I don't like the word and neither do the friends I am fond of."

Kelley later recalled that friends had advised him that pro football "was not a stable career." He also noted that pro football players in those days "were pretty much a rough and ready bunch, generally speaking." He added: "If I had come along later, when they offered more money, I probably would have played pro."

He also turned down a $15,000 offer to star in an autobiographical film titled, "Kelley of Yale".

== Career after Yale ==
Instead of playing a professional sport or going to Hollywood, Kelley accepted an offer to teach mathematics and history and coach football at the Peddie School, his alma mater. He was recruited by Peddie's headmaster, Dr. Saunders, and recalled that Dr. Saunders' pitch "hit the right spots." He was paid $2,000 a year when he started at Peddie. He remained at Peddie until 1941. He tried to enlist during World War II but was ruled ineligible because both eardrums had been ruptured by playing football. He was given a 2B designation and worked in war industries for the duration of the war.

Kelley went into business after the war. From 1946 to 1958, he worked for glove manufacturers in upstate New York. In 1958, he joined the teaching staff at the Cheshire Academy, located 15 minutes from the Yale Bowl in Connecticut. He returned to Peddie in 1970 as alumni director. He retired from Peddie in 1975.

== Family and later years ==
Kelley was married four times. He married Katharine Duncan in September 1939, but the marriage lasted only three years. He was married for a second time in March 1946 with Anne Goodwin. In July 1961, he married his college sweetheart, Lovdie Augusta Webb. They were married for 13 years. He married his fourth wife, Ruth, in 1975. They remained married until Kelley's death. He had a daughter, Katharine Lynne Libby, with his first wife. However, she grew up believing that she was the daughter of her mother's second husband and had no contact with Kelley until later in life.

Kelley was inducted into the College Football Hall of Fame in 1969.

After retiring from the Peddie School, Kelley moved to Pensacola, Florida. In his final years, Kelley suffered a stroke and had heart bypass surgery. On June 27, 2000, six months after selling his Heisman Trophy, Kelley shot himself in the head with a handgun in the basement of his house in Hightstown. Months after Kelley's death, Sports Illustrated published a relatively negative longform piece about his life, which touched upon his multiple failed marriages, his nonexistent relationship with his only biological child, and his decision to commit suicide at home knowing his elderly widow would be the one to discover his body.
