= Paul Tangora =

American football player

Profile
- Position: Guard

Career information
- College: Northwestern, 1933–1935
- NFL draft: 1936: 4th round, 29th overall pick

Awards and highlights
- First-team All-American (1935); First-team All-Big Ten (1935)

Paul Tangora was an American football player for the Northwestern Wildcats from 1933 to 1935. In 1935, the Associated Press named him as a first-team All-American for the guard position. Tangora was raised in Washington, D.C..

== Playing career ==
He enrolled at Northwestern University where he was selected as a first-team All-American at the guard position by the Associated Press in 1935. After Northwestern defeated Notre Dame in 1935 (the first victory for Northwestern over Notre Dame in 34 years), the Associated Press labeled Tangora the "Wildcat Hero." The wire service reported that "it was Tangora, a square-chinned six-footer, who turned the tide" in the Notre Dame game. Aside from stopping the Notre Dame offense from his spot in the middle of the line, Tangora recovered a fumble in the fourth quarter that set up Northwestern's winning touchdown. He was drafted in the fourth round of the 1936 NFL Draft by the Boston Redskins (29th overall) but never played in the NFL.

== Personal life ==
Tangora gained extensive press coverage in December 1935 when he announced his intention to change his major from art to criminology. After a tour of the FBI's laboratory in Washington, D.C., the All-American announced that he was determined to become a "G-Man." Tangora told the Associated Press, "I had no more idea than, the man in the moon what I wanted to do when I came to Northwestern. Finally I discovered I could draw and for awhile decided to make that my life work Then about a year ago I got interested in the department of justice and I knew then that I had found myself." In 1955, Tangora was employed as the Safety Commissioner in Champaign, Illinois. He gained notoriety in 1955 for padlocking a transient hotel that he characterized as a "flop house" in which men were living in filth. Tangora vowed that "we'll have no skid row in Champaign."

== See also ==
- 1935 College Football All-America Team
