= 1935 Indiana Hoosiers football team =

American college football season

1935 Indiana Hoosiers football
- Conference: Big Ten Conference
- Record: 4–3–1 (2–2–1 Big Ten)
- Head coach: Bo McMillin (2nd season)
- MVP: Wendell Walker
- Captain: Reed Kelso
- Home stadium: Memorial Stadium

1935 Big Ten Conference football standings
	Conf.					Overall
Team	W		L		T	W		L		T
No. 1 Minnesota +	5	–	0	–	0	8	–	0	–	0
No. 5 Ohio State +	5	–	0	–	0	7	–	1	–	0
Purdue	3	–	3	–	0	4	–	4	–	0
Indiana	2	–	2	–	1	4	–	3	–	1
No. 16 Northwestern	2	–	3	–	1	4	–	3	–	1
No. 18 Iowa	1	–	2	–	2	4	–	2	–	2
Chicago	2	–	3	–	0	4	–	4	–	0
Michigan	2	–	3	–	0	4	–	4	–	0
Illinois	1	–	4	–	0	3	–	5	–	0
Wisconsin	1	–	4	–	0	1	–	7	–	0
+ – Conference co-champions; Rankings from United Press

The 1935 Indiana Hoosiers football team represented the Indiana Hoosiers in the 1935 college football season. The participated as members of the Big Ten Conference. The Hoosiers played their home games at Memorial Stadium in Bloomington, Indiana. The team was coached by Bo McMillin, in his second year as head coach of the Hoosiers.

== Schedule ==
Date	Time	Opponent	Site	Result	Attendance	Source
October 5	2:00 p.m.	Centre*	Memorial Stadium; Bloomington, IN	W 14–0	10,000	
October 12		at Michigan	Michigan Stadium; Ann Arbor, MI	L 0–7	18,533	
October 19		at Cincinnati*	Nippert Stadium; Cincinnati, OH	L 0–7		
October 26		Ohio State	Memorial Stadium; Bloomington, IN	L 6–28	15,000	
November 2		at Iowa	Iowa Stadium; Iowa City, IA	T 6–6		
November 9		vs. Maryland*	Municipal Stadium; Baltimore, MD	W 13–7		
November 16		at Chicago	Stagg Field; Chicago, IL	W 24–0		
November 23		Purdue	Memorial Stadium; Bloomington, IN (Old Oaken Bucket)	W 7–0	25,000	
*Non-conference game; All times are in Central time

== 1936 NFL draftees ==
Player	Position	Round	Pick	NFL club
Ettore Antonini	End	6	51	Chicago Cardinals
