= 1935 Illinois Fighting Illini football team =

American college football season

1935 Illinois Fighting Illini football
- Conference: Big Ten Conference
- Record: 3–5 (1–4 Big Ten)
- Head coach: Robert Zuppke (23rd season)
- MVP: Ed Gryboski
- Captain: Charles S. Galbreath
- Home stadium: Memorial Stadium

1935 Big Ten Conference football standings
	Conf.					Overall
Team	W		L		T	W		L		T
No. 1 Minnesota +	5	–	0	–	0	8	–	0	–	0
No. 5 Ohio State +	5	–	0	–	0	7	–	1	–	0
Purdue	3	–	3	–	0	4	–	4	–	0
Indiana	2	–	2	–	1	4	–	3	–	1
No. 16 Northwestern	2	–	3	–	1	4	–	3	–	1
No. 18 Iowa	1	–	2	–	2	4	–	2	–	2
Chicago	2	–	3	–	0	4	–	4	–	0
Michigan	2	–	3	–	0	4	–	4	–	0
Illinois	1	–	4	–	0	3	–	5	–	0
Wisconsin	1	–	4	–	0	1	–	7	–	0
+ – Conference co-champions; Rankings from United Press

The 1935 Illinois Fighting Illini football team was an American football team that represented the University of Illinois during the 1935 college football season. In their 23rd season under head coach Robert Zuppke, the Illini compiled a 3–5 record and finished in a tie for last place in the Big Ten Conference. Guard Ed Gryboski was selected as the team's most valuable player.

On November 9, 1935, Illinois defeated Michigan, 3 to 0, before a homecoming crowd of 28,136 at a rainy Memorial Stadium in Champaign, Illinois. In a low-scoring match, Lowell Spurgeon kicked a 22-yard field goal for Illinois in the second quarter. Michigan's offense was stifled by the Illinois defense. The Wolverines gained only 10 yards of total offense and secured only one first down, that one coming on an Illinois penalty for running into the punter in the third quarter. Michigan threw only two forward passes, with either one or both of them resulting in an interception.

== Schedule ==
Date	Opponent	Site	Result	Attendance	Source
September 28	Ohio*	Memorial Stadium; Champaign, IL	L 0–6	19,404	
October 5	Washington University*	Memorial Stadium; Champaign, IL	W 28–6	18,886	
October 12	at USC*	Los Angeles Memorial Coliseum; Los Angeles, CA	W 19–0	50,000	
October 26	Iowa	Memorial Stadium; Champaign, IL	L 0–19	26,647	
November 2	at Northwestern	Dyche Stadium; Evanston, IL (rivalry)	L 3–10	36,000	
November 9	Michigan	Memorial Stadium; Champaign, IL (rivalry)	W 3–0	28,136	
November 16	at Ohio State	Ohio Stadium; Columbus, OH (Illibuck)	L 0–6	43,000	
November 23	Chicago	Memorial Stadium; Champaign, IL	L 6–7	12,536	
*Non-conference game
