= Wally Cruice =

American football player, coach, and scout (1913–2001)

Profile
- Position: Halfback

Personal information
- Born: April 13, 1913
- Died: December 7, 2001 (aged 88); Indianapolis, Indiana, U.S.

Career information
- College: Northwestern
- NFL draft: 1936: 8th round, 70th overall pick

Career history
- Green Bay Packers: Scout (1946–1949, 1952–1976)

Awards and highlights
- Second-team All-Big Ten (1935)

Walter G. Cruice (April 13, 1913 – December 7, 2001) was an American professional football player, assistant coach, and scout in the National Football League (NFL) with the Green Bay Packers. He served as chief scout for 31 years under every head coach from Curly Lambeau through Bart Starr. During his time with the team, the Packers won five league championships, including the first two Super Bowls.

== Playing career ==
Cruice played high school football at Washington High School in Milwaukee. His high school coach was future Packers' coach Lisle Blackbourn, for whom he later served under as chief scout from 1954 to 1957. He then played college football as a halfback at Northwestern University from 1934 to 1936 and was the team's co-captain and most valuable player as a senior. After his final season, he played in the East–West Shrine Game.

Cruice was drafted by the Packers as the 70th pick in the 1936 NFL draft, but turned down the contract offer. Instead, he went to work for an oil company in Chicago and played for the Chicago Gunners, a regional professional team.

== Coaching career ==
Cruice began his coaching career by coaching freshman football at Northwestern in 1938 and 1939. During World War II, he served as an officer in the United States Navy and was an assistant football coach for the Great Lakes Navy Bluejackets and Fleet City Bluejackets.

Cruice was hired by the Packers in 1946 and worked for them through 1949. When Curly Lambeau resigned as the Packers' coach and took over the Chicago Cardinals, Cruice left with him for two seasons. Cruice returned to the Packers in 1952 under Gene Ronzani and scouted for them through the 1976 season, Bart Starr's second as head coach. Cruice also served under Scooter McLean, Vince Lombardi, Phil Bengtson and Dan Devine.

== Death ==
Cruice died of prostate cancer, on December 7, 2001, in Indianapolis.
