= Ed Skoronski =

American football player (1910–1996)

- Skoronski with the Purdue Boilermakers

No. 26, 12, 18
- Position: End / center / linebacker

Personal information
- Born: October 15, 1910; Chicago, Illinois, U.S.
- Died: December 22, 1996 (aged 86)
- Listed height: 6 ft 2 in (1.88 m)
- Listed weight: 213 lb (97 kg)

Career information
- High school: Bowen (Chicago)
- College: Purdue

Career history
- Pittsburgh Pirates (1935–1936); Cleveland Rams (1937); Brooklyn Dodgers (1937)
- Stats at Pro Football Reference

Edmund John Skoronski (October 15, 1910 – December 22, 1996) was an American professional football player who played three seasons in the National Football League (NFL) with the Pittsburgh Pirates, Cleveland Rams and Brooklyn Dodgers. He played college football at Georgetown University and Purdue University.

== Early life and college ==
Edmund John Skoronski was born on October 15, 1910, in Chicago, Illinois. He attended Bowen High School in Chicago.

Skoronski was a member of the Georgetown Hoyas of Georgetown University from 1930 to 1931 and a letterman in 1931. According to the Ledger-Star, he did not graduate from Bowen High School until after leaving Georgetown.

Skoronski then enrolled at Purdue University in fall 1932 and was a member of the Purdue Boilermakers from 1933 to 1935. He earned all-state honors in 1933 and was a team captain in 1935. On October 22, 1935, he was declared ineligible for the rest of the season due to his having played for Georgetown in 1931. He was a center while at Purdue. Skoronski also participated in baseball and track at Purdue.

== Professional football career ==
After losing his college football eligibility, Skoronski signed with the Pittsburgh Pirates of the National Football League (NFL) on November 20, 1935. He made his professional football debut on November 24, 1935, starting in place of the injured Lee Mulleneaux at center against the Green Bay Packers. Overall, Skoronski played in three games for the Pirates that year and was listed as a center/linebacker.

Skoronski then played in all 12 games, starting six, for the Pirates as an end in 1936 and caught eight passes for 95 yards and one touchdown. The Pirates finished the season with a 6–6 record. He was released in 1937.

Skoronski was signed by the Cleveland Rams in 1937. He appeared in three games for the Rams during the team's inaugural 1937 season. He was listed as a center/linebacker while with the Rams.

On November 11, 1937, Skoronski was traded to the Brooklyn Dodgers. He played in five games, starting four, for the Dodgers during the 1937 season and was listed as a guard. He was released in 1938.

== Professional baseball career ==
Skoronski played baseball for the Lafayette Red Sox of the Indiana-Ohio league in 1936. The 1936 Red Sox had an 8–3 record in games that Skoronski played in and a 6–7 record without him. He attended spring training with the Chicago White Sox in 1937. He then had a short stint with the Dallas Steers of the Texas League. In May 1937, he returned to the Lafayette Red Sox and played for them during the 1937 season.

== Personal life ==
Skoronski was of Polish descent. In 1939, he married Marion Byrne. Skoronski died on December 22, 1996.
