= 1935 Chicago Maroons football team =

American college football season

1935 Chicago Maroons football
- Conference: Big Ten Conference
- Record: 4–4 (2–3 Big Ten)
- Head coach: Clark Shaughnessy (3rd season)
- Home stadium: Stagg Field

1935 Big Ten Conference football standings
	Conf.					Overall
Team	W		L		T	W		L		T
No. 1 Minnesota +	5	–	0	–	0	8	–	0	–	0
No. 5 Ohio State +	5	–	0	–	0	7	–	1	–	0
Purdue	3	–	3	–	0	4	–	4	–	0
Indiana	2	–	2	–	1	4	–	3	–	1
No. 16 Northwestern	2	–	3	–	1	4	–	3	–	1
No. 18 Iowa	1	–	2	–	2	4	–	2	–	2
Chicago	2	–	3	–	0	4	–	4	–	0
Michigan	2	–	3	–	0	4	–	4	–	0
Illinois	1	–	4	–	0	3	–	5	–	0
Wisconsin	1	–	4	–	0	1	–	7	–	0
+ – Conference co-champions; Rankings from United Press

The 1935 Chicago Maroons football team was an American football team that represented the University of Chicago in the Big Ten Conference (Big Ten) during the 1935 college football season. In their third season under head coach Clark Shaughnessy, the Maroons compiled a 4–4 record (2–3 against Big Ten opponents), finished in sixth place in the Big Ten, and were outscored by their opponents by a combined total of 110 to 102.

In December 1935, Chicago halfback Jay Berwanger became the first recipient of a trophy from the Downtown Athletic Club intended to honor "the most valuable player east of the Mississippi." John Heisman was then the club's athletic director, and after Heisman's death in October 1936 the trophy was expanded to become a national honor and named the Heisman Trophy.

== Schedule ==
Date	Opponent	Site	Result	Attendance	Source
September 28	at Nebraska*	Memorial Stadium; Lincoln, NE	L 7–28		
October 5	Carroll (WI)*	Stagg Field; Chicago, IL	W 31–0		
October 12	Western State Teachers (MI) *	Stagg Field; Chicago, IL	W 31–6	24,000	
October 19	Purdue	Stagg Field; Chicago, IL (rivalry)	L 0–19	25,000	
October 26	Wisconsin	Stagg Field; Chicago, IL	W 13–7		
November 9	Ohio State	Stagg Field; Chicago, IL	L 13–20	15,000	
November 16	Indiana	Stagg Field; Chicago, IL	L 0–24		
November 23	at Illinois	Memorial Stadium; Champaign, IL	W 7–6	12,536	
*Non-conference game

== NFL draft ==
One Maroon player was drafted as part of the inaugural NFL draft following the season.

Player	Position	Round	Pick	Franchise
Jay Berwanger	Halfback	1	1	Philadelphia Eagles
