= Babe LeVoir =

American football player (1913–1999)

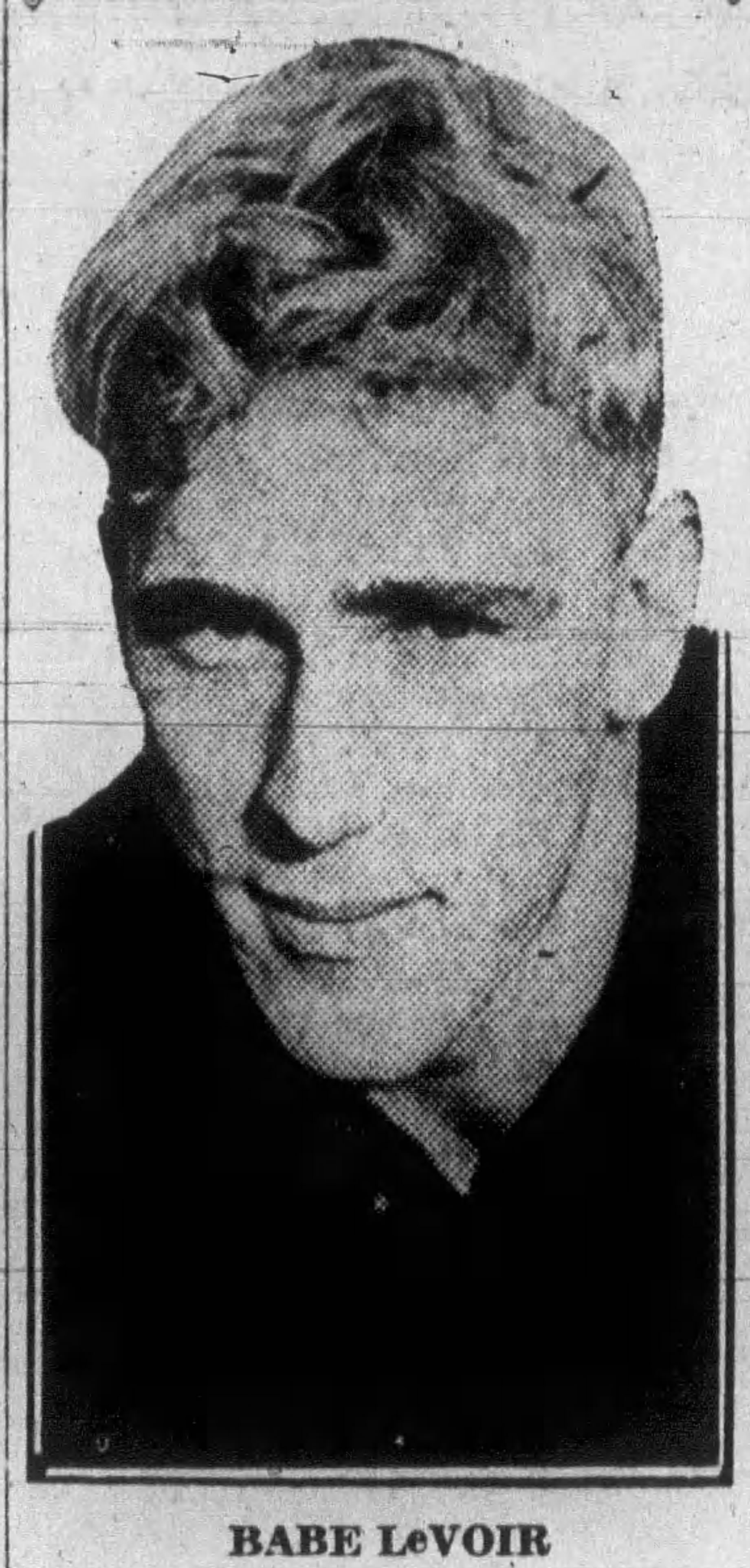
- LeVoir, 1935

Profile
- Positions: Halfback, quarterback

Personal information
- Born: May 27, 1913; Bovey, Minnesota, U.S.
- Died: September 7, 1999 (aged 86); Edina, Minnesota, U.S.

Career information
- High school: Marshall (Minneapolis)
- College: Minnesota (1932–1935); Iowa Pre-Flight (1942)
- NFL draft: 1936: 2nd round, 13th overall pick

Awards and highlights
- 2× National champion (1934, 1935); First-team All-Big Ten (1935)

Vernal Alfred "Babe" LeVoir (May 27, 1913 – September 7, 1999) was an American football player. A halfback and quarterback, he played college football for the Minnesota Golden Gophers from 1932 to 1935 and helped lead the Gophers to a combined 16–0 record and two national championships in 1934 and 1935. He was selected as the most valuable player on Minnesota's 1935 national championship team. He was also the 13th player selected in the first NFL draft, but chose not to play and instead entered the military.

== Early life ==
LeVoir was born on May 27, 1913, in Bovey, Minnesota. He attended Marshall High School in Minneapolis. He was rated as the greatest all-around athlete in the school's history, winning more varsity letters than any other athlete in school history. He received letters in golf, basketball, hockey, baseball, and football.

== Football player ==
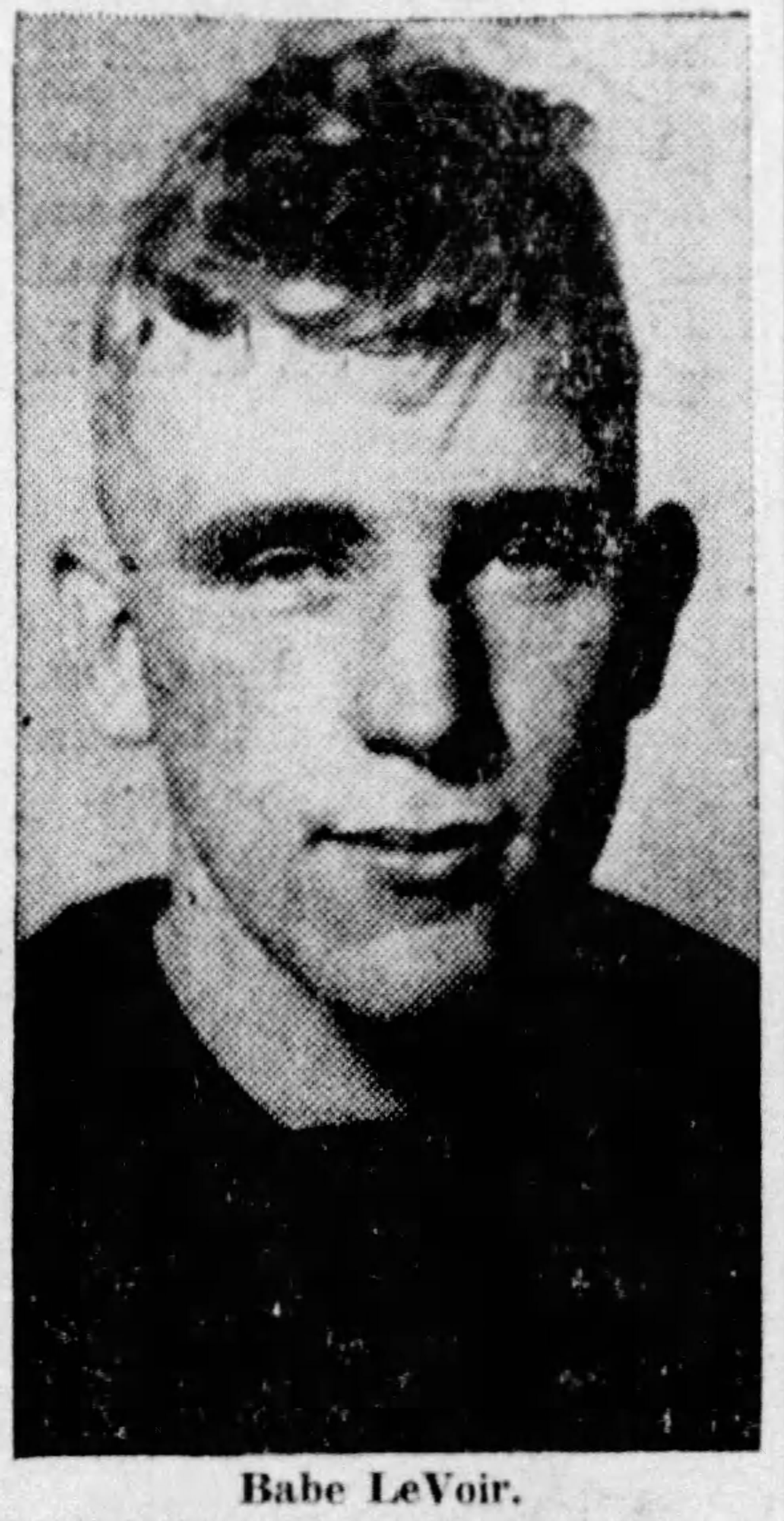
LeVoir, 1930

LeVoir played college football for Minnesota from 1932 to 1935. During his junior and senior years, he led the Gophers to a combined 16–0 record and two national championships. He began the 1935 season as a quarterback and fullback and also played at halfback, winning a reputation as a "handy Andy". He also accounted for 16 extra-point kicks, and was also "noted for his terrific blocking and defensive ability." At the end of the season, he was selected by his teammates as the most valuable player on Minnesota's 1935 national championship team. He was also selected by both the Associated Press and the United Press as the first-team quarterback on the 1935 All-Big Ten Conference football team.

LaVoir was the 13th player selected in the first NFL draft, having been selected by the Brooklyn Dodgers in the second round of the 1936 NFL draft. He chose not to play professional football, but he did appear in the 1936 Chicago Charities College All-Star Game, scoring the first touchdown by a college player (a 17-yard sprint in the second quarter) in the history of that game. His touchdown gave the college all-stars a 7–7 tie against the NFL champion Detroit Lions.

== Military service and later years ==
LeVoir enlisted in the United States Navy after the attack on Pearl Harbor. Initially assigned to the Navy's pre-flight school at the University of Iowa, LeVoir played at halfback and fullback under Bernie Bierman on the all-star 1942 Iowa Pre-Flight Seahawks football team that was ranked No. 2 in a special Associated Press poll of the courtry's service teams. He left the pre-flight school in 1943 and served 19 months of sea duty as athletic and gunnery officer aboard an aircraft carrier in the South Pacific; he was assigned as commander of all aircraft carrier athletics in the Pacific in early 1945. He was inducted into the University of Minnesota's M Club Hall of Fame in 1994.

LeVoir married Mary Roney Kennedy in 1951 at Edina, Minnesota. He died from respiratory and heart failure on September 7, 1999, at age 86 at the Fairview Southdale Hospital in Edina. He was buried at the Fort Snelling National Cemetery in Minneapolis.
