= Harry Grayson =

American sportswriter (1894–1968)

- Born: May 10, 1894; Astoria, Oregon, U.S.
- Died: September 30, 1968 (aged 74); New York, New York, U.S.

Harry Markey Grayson (May 10, 1894 – September 30, 1968) was an American sportswriter. He was the sports editor of the Newspaper Enterprise Association from 1934 to 1963.

== Selected works by Grayson ==
=== Baseball ===
- Wagner and Mathewson Top National Loop's All-Time Greats (Honus Wagner/Christy Mathewson), February 5, 1936
- Landis To Smash Cards Syndicate, March 18, 1938
- Scott Gives Gehrig Three More Seasons (Lou Gehrig), May 2, 1939
- He Wants To Be A Fireman: Eccentric Ted Williams Wants To Quit Baseball (Ted Williams), May 28, 1940
- Feller May Win 30 As Indians Race Tigers Down Home Stretch (Bob Feller), August 19, 1940
- Scandal Broke Up "Greatest Team" (Black Sox Scandal), December 3, 1944
- Rickey Is Running Dodgers, Accounting for All Confusion (Branch Rickey), April 20, 1948
- Baseball World Mourns Passing of Most Glamorous Figure: Babe Pulled Game From Doldrums, Made Baseball What It Is Today (Babe Ruth), August 17, 1948
- Dodgers' 'Flying Ebony' Was Most Feared Man in Series (Jackie Robinson), October 13, 1949
- Stengel's Multiple Moves Have Managers Emulating Puppeteers (Casey Stengel), June 27, 1953
- Bad Pitches, Sulking Remain Mantle's Big Faults (Mickey Mantle), February 28, 1957
- Cobb, Out of Baseball for 29 Years, Doubts Umps' Vision, July 27, 1957
- Berra Gets Rich Hitting 325 Foot Home Runs (Yogi Berra), June 25, 1962
- Help Wanted: Kaline Could Carry Club If He Had One To Carry (Al Kaline), June 22, 1963
- American League Is Sick, Sick, Sick, June 21, 1964

=== "They Played The Game" ===
In 1943, Grayson published a series of profiles on the great figures in baseball history. The series was published in newspapers under the name, "They Played The Game." This section links to a number of those articles. The following year, the articles were compiled into a book having the same title.

- Bad Loser Cobb Stands Alone As Fiery Genius of Baseball (Ty Cobb), March 28, 1943
- Johnson's Hurling An Open Book: Yet Big Train Threw Past Best of Hitters (Walter Johnson), March 31, 1943
- The Great Rajah! (Rogers Hornsby), April 28, 1943
- Baker's Home Runs Meant Something (Home Run Baker), April 1, 1943
- Ruth Drew $80,000 A Year And Was Grossly Underpaid (Babe Ruth), April 6, 1943
- Collins Calls Plank Greatest Pitcher; Kept Batters Waiting (Eddie Plank), April 19, 1943
- Tinker To Evers To Chance: Names That Spelled Double (Baseball's Sad Lexicon), April 20, 1943
- Eddie Collins Simply Had To Be Doing Something (Eddie Collins), April 21, 1943
- Black Sox Expunged From Records, But How They Could Play the Game! (Black Sox Scandal), April 26, 1943
- Effortless, Matchless for 19 Years, Alex Picked Up Where Young Left Off (Grover Cleveland Alexander), April 28, 1943
- Delahanty Was Ruth of Dead Ball Days (Ed Delahanty), May 3, 1943
- Sisler, The Picture Player, Came Closest To Being a Cobb (George Sisler), May 5, 1943
- Severed Finger Helped Mordecai Brown to Achieve Rank Among Greatest Pitchers (Mordecai Brown), May 7, 1943
- Ed Walsh, The Greatest Of Spitballers, Pitched His Arm Off For the White Sox (Ed Walsh), May 9, 1943
- Quick-on-the-Trigger Kelly Played Ball Like Cobb 25 Years Before (King Kelly), May 9, 1943
- Vance Was Violent Pitcher With Power, Speed To Burn (Dazzy Vance), May 26, 1943
- Watching Clam Shell Sail Gave Gave First Curve Ball To Cummings; They Said It Couldn't Be Done (Candy Cummings), May 28, 1943
- Collins Third Base Stylist; Couldn't Hit Ball Past Him (Jimmy Collins), June 2, 1943
- Huggins Excelled As Lead-Off Man (Miller Huggins), June 5, 1943
- Five Consecutive Shutouts Record Still Held by White (Doc White), June 5, 1943
- Anson An Idol Who Never Fell; Real Leader In Every Respect (Cap Anson), June 8, 1943
- Southpaw Rube Waddell Eccentric But How He Could Throw a Ball (Rube Waddell, June 15, 1943
- Trouble Followed Storm-Center Mays; Sore Arm Made Him Pitch Underhand (Carl Mays), June 16, 1943
- Altrock Wasn't Always A Clown; Was Great Pitcher (Nick Altrock), June 20, 1943
- Scott Padded Shoes To Escape Being Cut; Played 1307 Straight Games At Short (Everett Scott), June 21, 1943
- Zack Wheat Claimed Honor As Brooklyn's Most Popular (Zack Wheat), June 29, 1943
- Griffith Gained Tag, Old Fox, as Mound Ace for Cap Anson (Clark Griffith), July 8, 1943
- Sockalexis Socked Like Ruth, Was Faster Than Cobb, Threw a la Meusel (Louis Sockalexis), August 5, 1943

=== Football ===
- Rose Bowl Game Needs Huey Long: Kingfish Would Make Tilt Really 'Greatest Show on Earth' in 1935, November 6, 1934
- Rose Bowl Battle A Classic Despite Criticism (Rose Bowl), December 26, 1934
- Redskins Meet Packers Sunday (1936 NFL Championship Game), December 9, 1936
- Army-Navy Is Great Show Regardless of Records, December 6, 1963

=== Hockey ===
- Ice Hockey's Growth as Fast as Contest Itself, December 27, 1935
- Detroit Favored To Retain Title, November 17, 1936
- Hockey Teams Take Aim at Detroit's 7-Year Run, November 14, 1955
- Records Made To Be Broken But Not Richards' 500 Goals, October 26, 1957
- Maple Leafs' Star Learns His Lesson (Frank Mahovlich), December 25, 1960
- Canadiens' Line After All-Time Scoring Record, January 15, 1961
- Stylish Harvey Organizes Rangers' Sustained Attack, December 7, 1961
- All-Time Greatest in Hockey? Those Who Know Say Howe, October 26, 1963

=== Basketball ===
- The Scoreboard (Wilt Chamberlain), April 12, 1956
- Robertson Runs Bearcats While Leading Scorers (Oscar Robertson), January 2, 1960
- Lucas Could Have Own Way As Pro or In Business -- Now!, January 2, 1961
- Pro Basketball Grows As Big As Its Players, November 3, 1961
- Lucas and Robertson Give Pro Basketball Another Big Show, November 11, 1963

=== Boxing ===
- Louis' Hammering Fists 'Elixir' to Dying Fight Game (Joe Louis), December 20, 1935
- Louis Old Dog Learning New Tricks for Marciano Match, October 22, 1951

=== Golf ===
- More Golfers Should Have Yips Like Hogan, June 7, 1957
- Palmer's Open Win Gives Golf First Big Name Since Hogan, July 3, 1960
- Nicklaus Compared With Jones With No Apologies, June 19, 1962
- Arnie a One-Man Peace Corps (Arnold Palmer), November 17, 1962
- Magic of Bobby Jones, April 8, 1964

=== Other ===
- Sonja Henie Makes Country Ice Conscious and Rescues Arenas (Sonja Henie), January 21, 1938
- Big Bill Tilden Picks Don Budge As Greatest of Tennis Players (Bill Tilden), February 22, 1945
- Bobby Riggs Has Become No. 1 Tennis Promoter (Bobby Riggs), September 28, 1949
