= 1935 Minnesota Golden Gophers football team =

American college football season

1935 Minnesota Golden Gophers football

National champion (seven selectors) Big Ten co-champion
- Conference: Big Ten Conference
- Record: 8–0 (5–0 Big Ten)
- Head coach: Bernie Bierman (4th season)
- Offensive scheme: Single-wing
- MVP: Babe LeVoir
- Captain: Glen Seidel
- Home stadium: Memorial Stadium

1935 Big Ten Conference football standings
	Conf.					Overall
Team	W		L		T	W		L		T
No. 1 Minnesota +	5	–	0	–	0	8	–	0	–	0
No. 5 Ohio State +	5	–	0	–	0	7	–	1	–	0
Purdue	3	–	3	–	0	4	–	4	–	0
Indiana	2	–	2	–	1	4	–	3	–	1
No. 16 Northwestern	2	–	3	–	1	4	–	3	–	1
No. 18 Iowa	1	–	2	–	2	4	–	2	–	2
Chicago	2	–	3	–	0	4	–	4	–	0
Michigan	2	–	3	–	0	4	–	4	–	0
Illinois	1	–	4	–	0	3	–	5	–	0
Wisconsin	1	–	4	–	0	1	–	7	–	0
+ – Conference co-champions; Rankings from United Press

The 1935 Minnesota Golden Gophers football team represented the University of Minnesota in the 1935 college football season. In their fourth year under head coach Bernie Bierman, the Golden Gophers compiled an undefeated 8–0 record and outscored their opponents by a combined total of 194 to 36.

The team was named national champion by seven NCAA-designated major selectors in Billingsley, Boand, College Football Researchers Association, Helms, Litkenhous, National Championship Foundation, and Poling.

== Before the season ==
Coach Bierman had led Minnesota to an undefeated season in 1934.

== Schedule ==
Date	Opponent	Site	Result	Attendance
September 28	North Dakota Agricultural*	Memorial Stadium; Minneapolis, MN	W 26–6	35,000
October 12	at Nebraska*	Memorial Stadium; Lincoln, NE (rivalry)	W 12–7	37,000
October 19	Tulane*	Memorial Stadium; Minneapolis, MN	W 20–0	38,000
October 26	Northwestern^{†}	Memorial Stadium; Minneapolis, MN	W 21–13	52,000
November 2	Purdue	Memorial Stadium; Minneapolis, MN	W 29–7	49,400
November 9	at Iowa	Iowa Stadium; Iowa City, IA (rivalry)	W 13–6	52,000
November 16	at Michigan	Michigan Stadium; Ann Arbor, MI (Little Brown Jug)	W 40–0	35,000
November 23	Wisconsin	Memorial Stadium; Minneapolis, MN (rivalry)	W 33–7	45,000
*Non-conference game; ^{†}Homecoming

== Game summaries ==
=== North Dakota Agricultural ===
Week 1: North Dakota Agricultural at Minnesota

Team	1	2	3	4	Total
North Dakota State	0	6	0	0	6
• Minnesota	7	0	6	13	26

- Date: November 16
- Location: Minneapolis
- Game attendance: 35,000
- Referee: John Getchell

On September 28, 1935, Minnesota opened its season with a 26–6 victory over North Dakota Agricultural before a crowd of more than 34,000 at Memorial Stadium in Minneapolis. Minnesota scored four touchdowns, two by African-American left end Dwight T. Reed (one of them on a 40-yard pass from halfback George Roscoe) and one each by George Roscoe (on a four-yard run) and right end Ray King (on a 17-yard pass from Roscoe). Despite the victory, the Associated Press, in its account of the game, opined that the Golden Gophers "lacked the flaming spirit to win" that marked the undefeated 1934 Minnesota team.

=== At Nebraska ===
Week 2: Minnesota at Nebraska

Team	1	2	3	4	Total
• Minnesota	6	6	0	0	12
Nebraska	0	7	0	0	7

- Date: October 12
- Location: Lincoln, Nebraska
- Game attendance: 36,000
- Referee: Fred Gardner

On October 12, 1935, Minnesota defeated Dana X. Bible's Nebraska Cornhuskers, 12 to 7, at Memorial Stadium in Lincoln, Nebraska. George Roscoe returned the opening kickoff 74 yards and then scored on a lateral from Glenn Seidel. Early in the second quarter, Nebraska took the lead on a long touchdown run by quarterback Jerry LaNoue and an extra point. Roscoe ran for the winning touchdown later in the second quarter. Neither team scored in the second half. On defense, the Gophers kept Nebraska's highly touted halfback Lloyd Cardwell in check.

=== Tulane ===
Week 3: Tulane at Minnesota

Team	1	2	3	4	Total
Tulane	0	0	0	0	0
• Minnesota	13	7	0	0	20

- Date: October 19
- Location: Minneapolis
- Game attendance: 38,000

On October 19, 1935, Minnesota defeated Tulane, 20–0, before a crowd of 38,000 at Memorial Stadium in Minneapolis. The Gophers scored two touchdowns in the first quarter and another early in the second quarter, then spent the remainder of the game "in the roles of guinea pigs as their football professors made observations for future scientific operation when the going is tougher." Tulane totaled only two net rushing yards for the game. Minnesota captain Glenn Seidel suffered a broken collarbone in the game. Minnesota's touchdowns were scored by Sheldon Beise (on a four-yard run), Bud Wilkinson (on a 43-yard return of a blocked punt), and Clarence Thompson (on a short run).

=== Northwestern ===
On October 26, 1935, Minnesota defeated Northwestern, 21 to 13, before a homecoming crowd of 52,000, one of the largest in Minnesota football history. Northwestern took a 13-7 lead at halftime, but sophomore right halfback Clarence Thompson led Minnesota's comeback in the second half. He scored a touchdown in the third quarter and then ran 36 yards for the winning touchdown in the fourth quarter.

=== Purdue ===
On November 2, 1935, Minnesota defeated Purdue, 29–7, in Minneapolis. Right halfback George Roscoe scored Minnesota's first touchdown in the first quarter. Left halfback Clarence Thompson also scored for Minnesota.

=== At Iowa ===
On November 9, 1935, Minnesota defeated Iowa, 13-6, in Iowa City.

=== At Michigan ===
Week 7: Minnesota at Michigan

Team	1	2	3	4	Total
• Minnesota	20	7	7	6	40
Michigan	0	0	0	0	0

- Date: November 16
- Location: Michigan Stadium
- Game attendance: 32,029
- Referee: Masker

On November 16, 1935, Minnesota defeated Michigan, 40–0, at Michigan Stadium. It was Minnesota's 23rd consecutive game without a loss and the worst defeat in the history of the Michigan football program since 1892. Minnesota gained 432 rushing yards to 99 for Michigan and also held Michigan to 35 passing yards. Clarence Thompson returned a kickoff 85 yards for a touchdown. Andrew Uram scored two touchdowns on runs of 60 and 73 yards. Sheldon Beise also scored two touchdowns. Babe LeVoir scored on a 30-yard touchdown reception and kicked four extra points.

=== Wisconsin ===
On November 23, 1935, Minnesota defeated Wisconsin, 33-7, before a crowd of 45,000 spectators in Minneapolis. The victory was the 17th in a row for Minnesota and the 24th consecutive game without a defeat. Minnesota out-gained Wisconsin, 209 yards to 13 yards.

== Postseason ==
Total attendance for the season was 217,785, which averaged to 43,557. The season high for attendance was against Northwestern.

=== Awards and honors ===
Guard Bud Wilkinson was named All-American by Grantland Rice and the Associated Press (AP). Tackle Ed Widseth was named an All-American by the Walter Camp Football Foundation, United Press International (UPI), Liberty, Hearst and New York World Telegram. Tackle Dick Smith was named an All-American by the AP, UPI, New York World Telegram and Look Magazine. Halfback Sheldon Beise was named an All-American by the American Sports Service and New York Daily Mirror. Beise, quarterback Babe LeVoir, Smith, Widseth and Wilkinson were named All-Big Ten.

Quarterback Babe LeVoir was awarded the team most valuable player award.

== Roster ==
- Jules Alfonse, HB
- Ray Antil, E
- Sheldon Beise, FB
- Bruce H. Berryman
- Milt Bruhn, G
- Frank Dallera
- Malcolm Eiken
- Rudolph Gmitro, HB
- V. Stanley Hanson
- Sam E. Hunt
- Edward Kafka
- Ray Wallace King, E
- Dominic Krezowski, E
- Babe LeVoir, HB
- William Matheny, HB
- Lou Midler, G
- Vern Oech, G
- Dwight T. Reed, E
- Dale Rennebohm, C
- George Rennix, HB
- Samuel A. Riley
- Harvey Ring
- Whitman H. Rork
- George Roscoe, HB
- Glen E. Seidel, QB
- B. Willis Smith
- Dick Smith, T
- Vic Spadaccini, FB
- Bud Svendsen, C
- Tuffy Thompson, HB
- Raymond G. Trampe
- Andy Uram, HB
- Frank J. Warner
- Bob Weld, G
- Ed Widseth, T
- Russell F. Wile
- Bud Wilkinson, G
