= 1935 Northwestern Wildcats football team =

American college football season

1935 Northwestern Wildcats football
- Conference: Big Ten Conference
- Record: 4–3–1 (2–3–1 Big Ten)
- Head coach: Pappy Waldorf (1st season)
- Offensive scheme: Single wing
- Captain: Wally Cruice
- Home stadium: Dyche Stadium

1935 Big Ten Conference football standings
	Conf.					Overall
Team	W		L		T	W		L		T
No. 1 Minnesota +	5	–	0	–	0	8	–	0	–	0
No. 5 Ohio State +	5	–	0	–	0	7	–	1	–	0
Purdue	3	–	3	–	0	4	–	4	–	0
Indiana	2	–	2	–	1	4	–	3	–	1
No. 16 Northwestern	2	–	3	–	1	4	–	3	–	1
No. 18 Iowa	1	–	2	–	2	4	–	2	–	2
Chicago	2	–	3	–	0	4	–	4	–	0
Michigan	2	–	3	–	0	4	–	4	–	0
Illinois	1	–	4	–	0	3	–	5	–	0
Wisconsin	1	–	4	–	0	1	–	7	–	0
+ – Conference co-champions; Rankings from United Press

The 1935 Northwestern Wildcats team represented Northwestern University during the 1935 college football season. In their fifth year under head coach Pappy Waldorf, the Wildcats compiled a 4–3–1 record (2–3–1 against Big Ten Conference opponents) and finished in fifth place in the Big Ten Conference.

On October 5, Northwestern hosted the first night game in Big Ten history, losing 7–0 against Purdue before a crowd of 30,000 persons.

== Schedule ==
Date	Opponent	Site	Result	Attendance	Source
September 28	DePaul*	Dyche Stadium; Evanston, IL	W 14–0		
October 5	Purdue	Dyche Stadium; Evanston, IL	L 0–7	30,000	
October 19	at Ohio State	Ohio Stadium; Columbus, OH	L 7–28	42,355	
October 26	at Minnesota	Memorial Stadium; Minneapolis, MN	L 13–21	52,000	
November 2	Illinois	Dyche Stadium; Evanston, IL (rivalry)	W 10–3	36,000	
November 9	at Notre Dame *	Notre Dame Stadium; South Bend, IN (rivalry)	W 14–7	34,430–35,000	
November 16	Wisconsin	Dyche Stadium; Evanston, IL	W 32–13	20,000	
November 23	Iowa	Dyche Stadium; Evanston, IL	T 0–0	30,000	
*Non-conference game
