= Heisman Trophy =

Annual award for the most valuable college football player

- Sport: College football
- Awarded for: Outstanding performance which best exhibits the pursuit of excellence with integrity. Winners epitomize great ability combined with diligence, perseverance, hard work.
- Location: New York City, New York, U.S.
- Presented by: The Heisman Trophy Trust (2003–present); Downtown Athletic Club (1935–2002)

History
- First winner: Jay Berwanger, HB, Chicago
- Most recent: Fernando Mendoza, QB, Indiana
- Website: www.heisman.com

The Heisman Memorial Trophy (/ˈhaɪzmən/ HYZE-mən; also known simply as the Heisman) is awarded annually since 1935 to the top player in college football. It is considered the most prestigious award in the sport and is presented by the Heisman Trophy Trust following the regular season in December. The most recent winner is former Indiana Hoosiers quarterback, and first overall 2026 NFL Draft pick Fernando Mendoza.

The award was created by the Downtown Athletic Club to recognize "the most valuable college football player east of the Mississippi" and was first awarded to University of Chicago halfback Jay Berwanger. The award was given its name in 1936 after the death of the club's athletic director, John Heisman, and broadened to include players west of the Mississippi.

== Winners ==
USC has won the most Heisman trophies with eight. Ohio State, Oklahoma, and Notre Dame each have seven. Ohio State has had six different players win the award. The closest margin of votes was in 2009 between winner Mark Ingram II of Alabama and Toby Gerhart of Stanford. Ten Heisman Trophy winners are in the Pro Football Hall of Fame. Four winners have also been named Most Valuable Player in a Super Bowl.

Some winners have gone on to play in other professional sports, including Bo Jackson in baseball and Charlie Ward in basketball. Pete Dawkins and Dick Kazmaier are the only winners not to pursue a professional sports career: Dawkins had a career with the United States Army, where he achieved the rank of Brigadier General, while Kazmaier attended Harvard Business School, founded a consulting company specializing in sports marketing, and chaired the President's Council on Fitness, Sports, and Nutrition in 1988–89.

=== Trophy ===
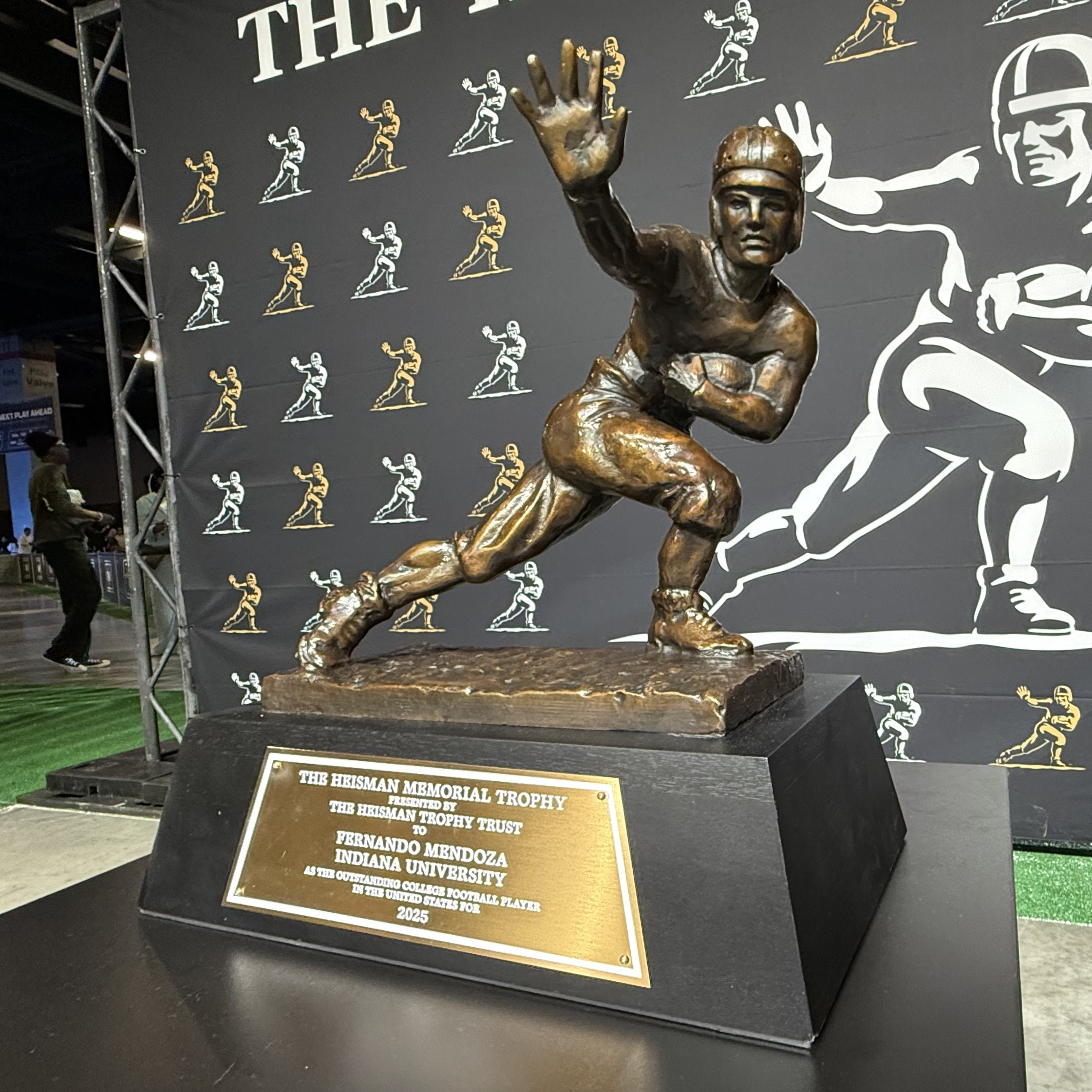
The Heisman Trophy awarded to Fernando Mendoza in 2025.

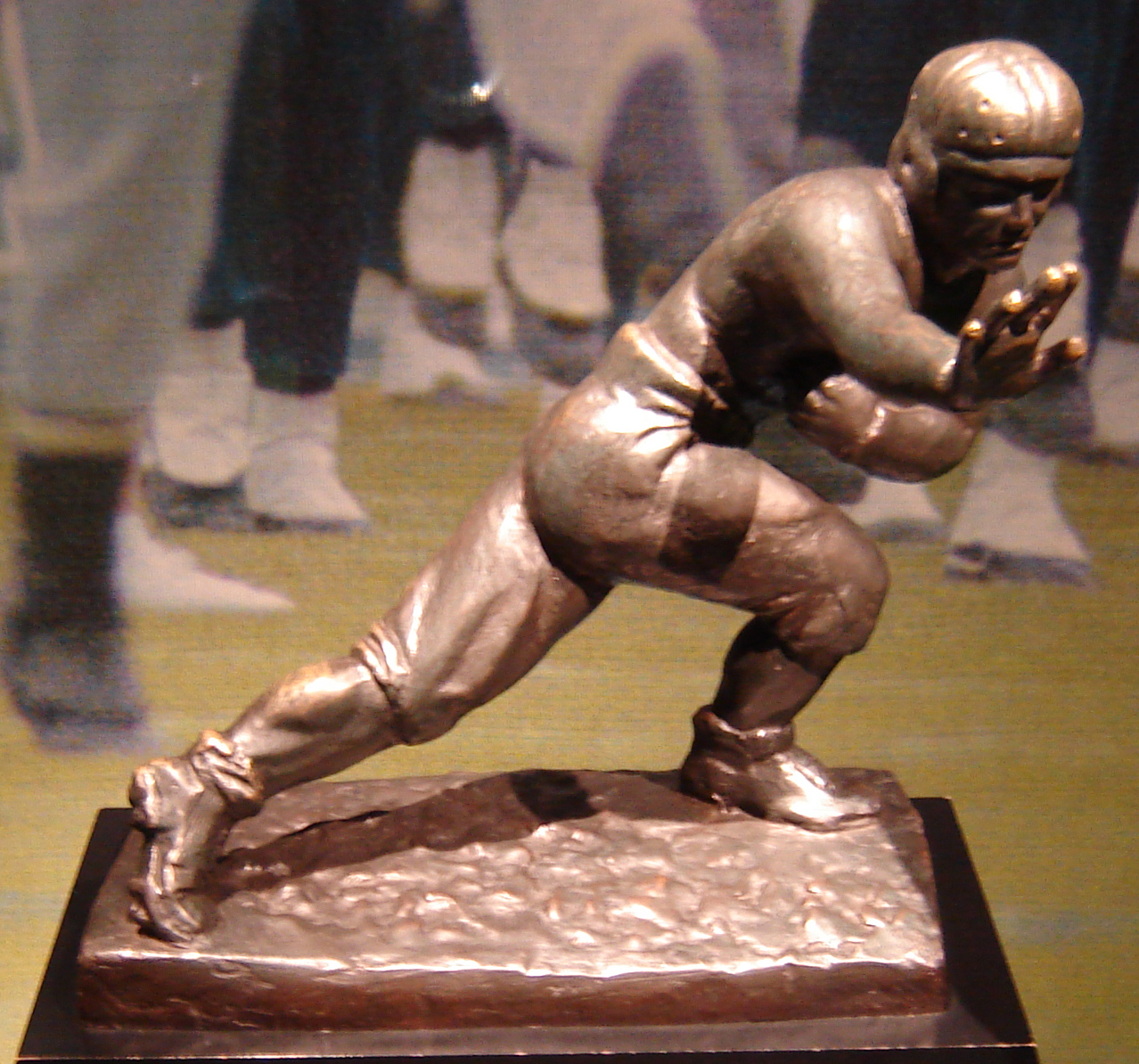
The Heisman Trophy awarded to John Cappelletti in 1973.

The trophy, designed by sculptor Frank Eliscu, is modeled after Ed Smith, a leading player in 1934 for the now-defunct New York University football team. The trophy is made out of cast bronze, is 13 inches (33 cm) tall, 14 inches (36 cm) long, 6 inches (15 cm) in width and weighs 45 pounds (20 kg). Eliscu had asked Smith, his former George Washington High School classmate, to pose for a commissioned sculpture of a football player. Smith did not realize until 1982 that the sculpture had become the Heisman Trophy. The Downtown Athletic Club presented Smith with a Heisman Trophy of his own in 1985.

From its inception in 1935, the statue was cast by Dieges & Clust in New York (and later Providence, Rhode Island) until 1980, when Dieges and Clust was sold to Herff Jones. For a time until at least 2008, the statues were cast by Roman Bronze Works in New York. Since 2005 the trophy has been made by MTM Recognition in Del City, Oklahoma.

== Selection process ==
Originally only players east of the Mississippi were eligible. Since 1936, all football players playing in all divisions of college football nationwide are eligible for the award, though winners usually represent Division I Football Bowl Subdivision schools.

There are three categories of eligible voters for the award winner:

- Sports journalists: Heisman.com states that sports journalists are to be the determinants of the award since they are "informed, competent, and impartial." There are 870 media voters: 145 voters from each of six regions.
- Previous Heisman winners: Every living Heisman winner is eligible to vote. There are currently 60 prior winners eligible to vote. A prior winner is not required to vote and does not lose his voting privileges by not voting.
- Fans: A fan survey is conducted through a dedicated website and through social media posts. This constitutes one Heisman vote.

Except for the one vote based on the fan voting, the balloting is based on positional voting. Each voter identifies three selections, ranking them in order. Each first-place selection is awarded three points, each second-place selection is awarded two points, and each third-place selection is awarded one point. Voters must make three selections and cannot duplicate a selection, or the ballot is invalid and none of the selections count. The accounting firm Deloitte is responsible for the tabulation of votes, which has moved almost exclusively to online voting since 2007.

=== Position ===
The Heisman has usually been awarded an offensive back: either a running back or a quarterback. Very few players have won the trophy playing a position other than those two. Four wide receivers have been named winner: Tim Brown (1987), Desmond Howard (1991), DeVonta Smith (2020), and Travis Hunter (2024). Two tight ends have won the trophy, Larry Kelley (1936) and Leon Hart (1949). Charles Woodson (1997) and Hunter are the only primarily defensive players to win the award, both doing so as defensive backs.

The highest finish ever for any individual who played exclusively on defense is second, by defensive end Hugh Green of Pittsburgh in 1980, linebacker Manti Teʻo of Notre Dame in 2012, and by defensive end Aidan Hutchinson of Michigan in 2021. Although John Heisman himself was an interior lineman, no interior lineman on either side of the ball has ever won the award. Legendary linebacker Dick Butkus of Illinois placed sixth in 1963 and third in 1964 and could qualify as an interior lineman, as he played center on offense during his era when two-way players were still common.

Offensive guard Tom Brown of Minnesota and the offensive tackle John Hicks of Ohio State placed second in 1960 and 1973, respectively. Rich Glover, a defensive lineman from Nebraska, finished 3rd in the 1972 vote—which was won by his Cornhusker teammate Johnny Rodgers. Washington's DT Steve Emtman finished 4th in voting in 1991. Ndamukong Suh of Nebraska finished fourth in 2009 as a defensive tackle. Kurt Burris, a center for the Oklahoma team, was a runner-up for the award in 1954 and Orlando Pace finished fourth in 1996 as an offensive tackle for Ohio State.

=== Class and age ===
For most of its history, most winners of the Heisman have been seniors. Texas A&M quarterback Johnny Manziel was the first freshman to win the Heisman in 2012. In 2013, freshman Florida State quarterback Jameis Winston won the Heisman. Both were in their second year of college, having been redshirted during their first year of attendance, meaning that no true freshman has yet won the award. No sophomore won the Heisman in its first 72 years, at which point there were three consecutive sophomore winners—Tim Tebow in 2007, followed by Sam Bradford and Mark Ingram II. Lamar Jackson, who also surpassed Winston's record as the youngest Heisman winner, became the fourth in 2016. Of the four sophomores to have won the award, only Bradford had been redshirted. The others all won during their second year of college attendance. Only a few juniors have won the award, starting with the eleventh winner in 1945, Doc Blanchard.

Five players have finished in the top three of the Heisman voting as freshmen or sophomores before later winning the award: Angelo Bertelli, Glenn Davis, Doc Blanchard, Doak Walker, and Herschel Walker. Eight players have finished in the top three as freshmen or sophomores but never won a Heisman: Clint Castleberry, Marshall Faulk, Michael Vick, Rex Grossman, Larry Fitzgerald, Adrian Peterson, Deshaun Watson, and Christian McCaffrey. Four players have specifically finished second in consecutive years: Glenn Davis (second in 1944 and 1945, winner in 1946), Charlie Justice (second in 1948 and 1949), Darren McFadden (second in 2006 and 2007), and Andrew Luck (second in 2010 and 2011).

The oldest and youngest Heisman winners ever both played for Atlantic Coast Conference schools. The oldest, Chris Weinke, was 28 years old when he won in 2000. He spent six years in minor league baseball before enrolling at Florida State. The youngest winner is 2016 recipient Lamar Jackson of Louisville at the age of 19 years, 338 days.

== History ==
In 1935, the award was first presented by the Downtown Athletic Club (DAC) in New York City, a privately owned recreation facility located on the lower west side near the later World Trade Center site. It was first known simply as the DAC Trophy. The first winner, Jay Berwanger, was drafted by the Philadelphia Eagles but declined to sign for them. He never played professional football for any team. In 1936, John Heisman died and the trophy was renamed in his honor. Larry Kelley, the second winner of the award, was the first man to win it as the "Heisman Trophy".

The first African American player to win the Heisman was Syracuse's Ernie Davis, who never played a snap in the NFL. He was diagnosed with leukemia shortly after winning the award and died in 1963. In 1966, former Florida Gators quarterback Steve Spurrier gave his Heisman trophy to university president J. Wayne Reitz, so that the award could be shared by Florida students and faculty. The gesture caused Florida's student government to raise funds to purchase a replacement trophy for Spurrier. Since then, the Downtown Athletic Club has issued two trophies to winners, one to the individual and a replica to his college.

Several Heisman trophies have been sold over the years. Although there is a ban on the sale of all trophies awarded since 1999, trophies awarded in previous years can be sold. O. J. Simpson's 1968 trophy was sold in February 1999 for $230,000 as part of the settlement of the civil trial following the acquittal in his murder case. Yale end Larry Kelley sold his 1936 Heisman in December 1999 for $328,110 to settle his estate and to provide a bequest for his family. Charles White's 1979 trophy first sold for $184,000 and then for nearly $300,000 in December 2006 to help pay back federal income taxes.

The current record price for a Heisman belongs to the trophy won by Minnesota halfback Bruce Smith in 1941, at $395,240. Paul Hornung sold his Heisman for $250,000 to endow scholarships for University of Notre Dame students from his hometown of Louisville, Kentucky. Eliscu's original plaster cast sold at Sotheby's for $228,000 in December 2005.

=== Venues ===
List of venues hosting the trophy presentation
Venue	Years
Downtown Athletic Club (New York, New York)	1935–2000
New York Marriott Marquis (New York, New York)	2001; 2017
The Yale Club of New York City (New York, New York)	2002–2003
Hilton New York (New York, New York)	2004
Palladium Times Square (New York, New York)	2005–2016; 2018–2019
ESPN headquarters (Bristol, Connecticut)	2020 (Note: Held remotely due to the COVID-19 pandemic)
Jazz at Lincoln Center (New York, New York)	2021–present

Due to the neighborhood housing the Downtown Athletic Club's facilities becoming blockaded after the attacks on 9/11, the 2001 award ceremony was moved to the New York Marriott Marquis in Times Square. After the DAC filed for bankruptcy in 2002, the Yale Club hosted the presentation at its facility in 2002 and 2003. The ceremony moved to the Hilton New York for 2004, and was presented annually at Palladium Times Square (then Nokia Theatre Times Square) from 2005 until its closure in 2019 (except in 2017, when the presentation was moved back to the Marquis because of a scheduling conflict).

The 2008 Heisman press conference was held at the Sports Museum of America at 26 Broadway near the old Downtown Club building. There was an entire gallery with the museum-attraction dedicated to the Trophy, including the making of the Trophy, the history of the DAC, and information on John Heisman and all the Trophy's winners. There was also a dedicated area celebrating the most recent winner, and the opportunity for visitors to cast their vote for the next winner (with the top vote-winner receiving 1 official vote on their behalf). The Sports Museum of America closed permanently in February 2009.

After Palladium Times Square (then PlayStation Theater) closed in December 2019, the Heisman Trust began searching for a new location to conduct the trophy presentation. The 2020 ceremony would ultimately be held at the studios of ESPN in Bristol, Connecticut due to the COVID-19 pandemic; the ceremony was a virtual event with all participants appearing via remote interviews. The 2021 ceremony returned to an in-person event, with the presentation held at The Appel Room at Jazz at Lincoln Center.

=== Television coverage ===
WOR-TV broadcast the 1949 ceremonies. Before 1977, the presentation of the award was not televised as a stand-alone special, but rather as a quick in-game feature. The ceremony usually aired on ABC as a feature at halftime of the last major national telecast (generally a rivalry game) of the college football season. ABC essentially showed highlights since the award was handed out as part of an annual weeknight dinner at the DAC. At the time, the event had usually been scheduled for the week following the Army–Navy Game. The most watched Heisman ceremony ever was in 2009 when Mark Ingram won over Toby Gerhart and Colt McCoy.

Broadcasters include:

- CBS (1977–1980, 1986–1990)
- ABC (1981–1984) – owned-and-operated stations only
- Syndication (1981–1985)
- NBC (1985) – owned-and-operated stations only
- NBC (1991–1993)
- ESPN (1994–present)

== Controversies and politics ==
=== Regional bias controversy ===
A number of critics have expressed concern about the unwritten rules regarding player position and age, as noted above.

Over the years, there has been substantial criticism of a regional bias, suggesting that the Heisman balloting process has ignored West Coast players. Before the breakup of the Pac-12 Conference (formerly Pac-10 and Pac-8), they represented 12 of the 65 teams in the Power Five conferences. The Heisman can be, and has been, presented to players from other conferences, but a random sample over a long period of time might suggest that Pac-10/12 players might win somewhere close to 18% of the Heisman awards.

In the 20 seasons between 1981 (Marcus Allen) and 2002 (Carson Palmer), not a single Pacific-10 Conference or other West Coast player won the Heisman Trophy. Four Southern California (USC) players have won the Trophy in the early years of the 21st century and three won it subsequent to Palmer. Although Terry Baker, quarterback from Oregon State, won the trophy in 1962, and Gary Beban from UCLA won in 1967, no non-USC player from the West Coast had won between Stanford's Jim Plunkett in 1970 and Oregon's Marcus Mariota in 2014.

Other than Mariota's win, the closest since Plunkett's win have been Chuck Muncie, John Elway, Toby Gerhart, Andrew Luck, Christian McCaffrey, and Bryce Love. Muncie was a running back for the California Golden Bears who finished second in the Heisman balloting in 1975. The other five were Stanford players who finished second in the Heisman balloting in 1982, and each year from 2009 to 2011, 2015, and 2017.

The West Coast bias discussion usually centers on the idea that East Coast voters see few West Coast games, because of television coverage contracts, time zone differences, or cultural interest. At Heisman-projection website StiffArmTrophy.com, commentator Kari Chisholm claims that the Heisman balloting process itself is inherently biased:

For Heisman voting purposes, the nation is divided into six regions—each of which get 145 votes. Put another way, each region gets exactly 16.67 percent of the votes. However, each region does not constitute an even one-sixth of the population. Three regions (Far West, Midwest, and Mid-Atlantic) have larger populations than 16.67% of the national population; and three have less (Northeast, South, and Southwest). In fact, the Far West has the greatest population at 21.2% of the country and the Northeast has the least at 11.9%.

=== Nullification of 2005 award and reinstatement ===
In 2010 University of Southern California athletic director Pat Haden announced the university would return its replica of the 2005 Heisman Trophy due to NCAA sanctions requiring the university to dissociate itself from Reggie Bush. The NCAA found that Bush had received gifts from an agent while at USC. On September 14, 2010, Bush voluntarily forfeited his title as a Heisman winner. The next day, the Heisman Trust announced the 2005 award would remain vacated and removed all mention of the 2005 award from its official website. Bush eventually returned the trophy itself to the Heisman Trust in 2012.

Critical responses from the national media were strident and varied. CBSSports.com producer J. Darin Darst opined that Bush "should never have been pressured to return the award." Kalani Simpson of Fox Sports wrote, "Nice try Heisman Trust...It's a slick move to try to wipe the slate clean." Former Football Writers Association of America president Dennis Dodd, on the other hand, decided to fictitiously award Bush's vacated 2005 award to Vince Young, the original runner-up that year. He wrote, "Since the Heisman folks won't re-vote, we did. Vince Young is the new winner of the 2005 Heisman." A Los Angeles Times piece argued that Bush's Heisman was "tainted," but lamented that the decision came five years after Bush was awarded the trophy and, therefore, four years after the expiration of Bush's term as current holder of the Heisman title.

On April 24, 2024, the Heisman Trust announced the formal reinstatement of Reggie Bush's trophy amid what it called "enormous changes in the college football landscape". The Trust cited "fundamental changes in college athletics" in which rules that have allowed student athlete compensation to become an accepted practice and the 2021 United States Supreme Court decision against the NCAA in the Alston case, which the Trust said "questioned the legality of the NCAA's amateurism model and opened the door to student athlete compensation". The school's copy of Bush's Heisman Trophy has still been kept by the Heisman Trust.
