= Ed Widseth =

American football player (1910–1998)

No. 77, 50
- Position: Offensive tackle

Personal information
- Born: January 5, 1910; Gonvick, Minnesota, U.S.
- Died: December 3, 1998 (aged 88); St. Paul, Minnesota, U.S.
- Listed height: 6 ft 1 in (1.85 m)
- Listed weight: 223 lb (101 kg)

Career information
- High school: McIntosh (MN)
- College: Minnesota-Crookston (1933); Minnesota (1934–1936)
- NFL draft: 1937: 1st round, 4th overall pick

Career history
- New York Giants (1937–1940)

Awards and highlights
- NFL champion (1938); First-team All-Pro (1938); Second-team All-Pro (1937); NFL All-Star (1938); 3× National champion (1934, 1935, 1936); Unanimous All-American (1936); Consensus All-American (1935); First-team All-American (1934); 3× First-team All-Big Ten (1934, 1935, 1936)

Career NFL statistics
- Games played: 44
- Games started: 22
- Stats at Pro Football Reference
- College Football Hall of Fame

Edwin Clarence Widseth (January 5, 1910 – December 3, 1998) was an American professional football player who was a tackle for the New York Giants of the National Football League (NFL) for four seasons. He played college football for the Minnesota Golden Gophers football team of the University of Minnesota, where he was a consensus All-American in 1935 and 1936. Widseth was drafted by the New York Giants in the first round of the 1937 NFL draft, and was chosen for the Pro Bowl in 1938. He was later inducted into the College Football Hall of Fame.

== University of Minnesota ==
Widseth was born in Gonvick, Minnesota in 1910. He played high school football at the Northwest School of Agriculture (later renamed University of Minnesota, Crookston) where he graduated in 1932. At the time, NSA was a boarding school. His family's farm had no access to electricity. He was also student body president. Widseth next enrolled at the University of Minnesota where he played football for Bernie Bierman's Minnesota Golden Gophers football teams of the mid-1930s. The Golden Gophers compiled a record of 23-1 during Widseth's three seasons on the team from 1934 to 1936. Widseth reportedly "'lived' in enemy backfields and was unquestionably the pillar of strength in the Gopher line" during a period in which they claimed three consecutive national championships. The only game the Golden Gophers lost during Widseth's three years as a starter was a 6–0 loss to Northwestern in 1936. Minnesota had a 28-game winning streak when they went to Evanston for a Halloween Day game against Northwestern. The game was scoreless when Widseth tackled a Northwestern player, and the referee accused Widseth of "slugging" the Northwestern player. After a 15-yard penalty was assessed, the ball was placed at Minnesota's one-yard line, and Northwestern scored a touchdown for the only points of the game. Widseth was a member of FarmHouse fraternity.

Widseth also won two varsity letters as a pitcher and first baseman for the Minnesota baseball team.

Widseth was selected as a first-team All-American in all three seasons he played for the Golden Gophers. As a sophomore in 1934, he was selected as a first-team All-American by the International News Service ("INS")—the Hearst newspaper syndicate. In 1935, he received first-team All-American honors from the United Press ("UP"), the All-America Board, Liberty, the INS, the North American Newspaper Alliance, the Central Press Association, and the Walter Camp Football Foundation ("WCFF"). In 1936, he was a consensus All-American receiving first-team honors from the Associated Press, the UP, Collier's Weekly, the INS, the Newspaper Editors Association, Liberty, the Central Press, and WCFF.

== Professional football ==
Widseth was drafted in the first round (fourth overall) of the 1937 NFL draft. He played for the New York Giants from 1937 to 1940. Widseth was recognized as an all-NFL player three consecutive years. As a rookie in 1937, he was selected as a second-team All-NFL player by Collyers Eye Magazine, the INS, the NFL, the New York Daily News and the United Press. In 1938, he was rated a first-team All-NFL player by Collyer's Eye, the Pro Football Writers, the INS, the NFL, the New York Daily News, and the United Press. He was selected to the 1938 Pro Bowl. In 1939, he was selected as a second-team All-NFL player by the NFL and New York Daily News.

== Later years and honors ==
Widseth coached St. Thomas College from 1945 to 1946 and his team won the Minnesota College Conference title both years.

Widseth was inducted into the College Football Hall of Fame in 1954. His official biography at the Hall of Fame describes him as follows: "A slashing, driving invader, Widseth used his 6-2 220-pound body to pummel opposing players, relentlessly advancing until the ball-carrier was within his grasp and quickly felled."

The football field at the University of Minnesota Crookston is named Ed Widseth Field in honor of Widseth.

Widseth died in 1998 at St. Paul, Minnesota. He is buried at Sunset Memorial Park Cemetery in Minneapolis, Minnesota.
