= Sheldon Beise =

American football player and coach (1911–1960)

Biographical details
- Born: September 15, 1911; Mound, Minnesota, U.S.
- Died: April 1, 1960 (aged 48); Excelsior, Minnesota, U.S.

Playing career
- 1931: Wisconsin
- 1933–1935: Minnesota
- Position: Fullback

Coaching career (HC unless noted)
- 1936–1941: Minnesota (backfield)
- 1942: Holy Cross (backfield)

Accomplishments and honors

Championships
- 3× National (1934, 1935, 1936)

Awards
- First-team All-American (1935); First-team All-Big Ten (1935)

Sheldon Beise (September 15, 1911 – April 1, 1960) was an American football player and coach.

== Biography ==
Beise was a native of Mound, Minnesota, where he was an all-around athlete, winning varsity letters in basketball, track, baseball and football at Mound High School. Beise began his collegiate career at the University of Wisconsin during the 1931–32 academic year. After one year, he transferred to the University of Minnesota. Beise played at the fullback position for the Minnesota Golden Gophers football teams from 1933 to 1935 and was selected as a first-team All-American in 1935 by the North American Newspaper Alliance, and the Central Press Association (based on a poll of college football captains taken). He was also named as a second-team All-American by the Associated Press, United Press, Newspaper Editors Association and New York Sun. He played on Bernie Bierman's national championship teams of 1934 and 1935 and never played in a losing game for Minnesota. He was considered a powerful plunger and one of the most effective blockers in the Bernie Bierman era of single wing football." He has been described as a "battering ram fullback," and one contemporary account notes that Minnesota's winning streak in the 1934 and 1935 seasons was due in no small measure to Biese's powerful drive." In addition to the All-American honors in 1935, he was an All-Big Ten Conference fullback for three consecutive years. He was also selected to play in the East-West Shrine game in San Frandsco after the 1935 season. Beise also participated in baseball and track at the University of Minnesota. He was drafted in the fourth round of the 1936 NFL Draft.

After graduating, Beise served as a backfield coach and physical education instructor at the University of Minnesota. He also coached football at the College of the Holy Cross, Worcester. After retiring from football, Beise worked in an insurance business. He was insurance superintendent for the Western Life Insurance Co., an affiliate of St. Paul Fire and Marine.

Beise was killed in an automobile accident in 1960. He was driving on Minnesota's Highway 7 when his car left the highway ten miles west of Minneapolis and hit a tree. He was alone in the car and suffered a fractured skull. He reportedly fell asleep at the wheel while driving to his home in rural Excelsior, Minnesota. Upon learning of Beise's death, Bierman told reporters, "This comes as a great shock to me. Shelly was a great football player, a real personal friend and a grand fellow in every way." Beise was survived by wife and two children, Barbara and Grant.

He was posthumously inducted into the University of Minnesota's "M" Club Hall of Fame in 2006.
