= Matt Patanelli =

American sports player and coach

- Patanelli, 1936

Profile
- Positions: End, Halfback

Personal information
- Born: July 13, 1914; Elkhart, Indiana, U.S.
- Died: May 27, 1992 (aged 77)
- Listed height: 6 ft 1 in (1.85 m)
- Listed weight: 200 lb (91 kg)

Career information
- High school: Elkhart High School
- College: University of Michigan

Career history

Playing
- 1934–1936: Michigan

Coaching
- 1944: Western Michigan (assistant)
- 1948–1951: Western Michigan (assistant)
- 1953: Michigan (defensive ends)
- 1954–1958: Michigan (ends)

Awards and highlights
- Third-team All-American (1936); First-team All-Big Ten (1935); Second-team All-Big Ten (1936); Most Valuable Player, 1936 Michigan Wolverines football team

Matthew Lewis Patanelli (July 13, 1914 – May 27, 1992) was an American football, baseball and basketball player and coach. He played and coached all three sports at the University of Michigan and was selected as the Most Valuable Player on the 1936 Michigan Wolverines football team. He was also the first University of Michigan football player to be selected in an NFL draft. He was an assistant football coach at Western Michigan University (1944, 1948–1951) and the University of Michigan (1953–1958).

== Early years in Elkhart, Indiana ==
Patanelli was born in Elkhart, Indiana, in 1914. He was a star athlete at Elkhart High School, earning 12 letters in football, basketball and track, and serving as the captain of the football and basketball teams. He was selected as an All State football player in 1931 and 1932, and graduated from Elkhart High School in 1933.

Matt's younger brother, Joe Patanelli, was a professional basketball and minor league baseball player.

== University of Michigan ==
Patanelli enrolled at the University of Michigan in the fall of 1933 and played for the Michigan Wolverines football, baseball and basketball teams. He played on Michigan's freshman football team in 1933, and received the Chicago alumni award, also known as the Meyer Morton Award, during spring practice in 1934 as the most promising freshman prospect.

As a sophomore in 1934, Patanelli played at both the end and halfback positions as a teammate of Gerald R. Ford.

He was a starter for Michigan at the end position in 1935 and 1936. In October 1935, Patanelli recovered an Indiana fumble in the end zone for the game's only touchdown, giving Michigan its first Big Ten Conference victory since 1933. At the end of the 1935 season, Patanelli was selected as a first-team All-Big Ten Conference player. He was also elected by his teammates to serve as captain of the 1936 Michigan Wolverines football team.

In 1936, Patanelli started all 8 games at the left end position for Michigan despite suffering from a strained ankle. The team finished with a record of 1–7, achieving its only victory against Columbia University. Patanelli's play was one of the few bright spots for Michigan in the 1936 season, and he was selected as the team's Most Valuable Player. At the time of his selection as the 1936 Most Valuable Player, Michigan head coach Harry Kipke said, "He's a grand person and a great leader. He had courage and this year had to play under a handicap -- a bad ankle. I'm sorry for one thing and it is that Matt never had the privilege of playing on a winning football team. Had he had this chance he certainly would have been picked on some all star eleven." Kipke's belief that Patanelli would have been selected as an All-American if he played for a better team was shared by Associated Press sports correspondent "Pap", who wrote:

"Capt. Matt Patanelli of Michigan, in the opinion of numerous Big Ten officials and coaches, would rate an end job on any mythical eleven if he were playing with a winner this season. Michigan's grid fortunes have been at a low ebb, but this hasn't prevented Matt from turning in great games, especially on the defense, each Saturday afternoon. Against Minnesota, when the Wolverines were routed 26-0, Patanelli broke into the Minnesota backfleld twice to throw runners for losses and his pass interception on the Michigan 7-yard line prevented another Gopher score."

Michigan's ends coach (and future College Football Hall of Fame inductee) Bennie Oosterbaan called Patanelli "the best blocking end he has coached."

Patanelli was voted by fans as a member of the Chicago Tribune College Football All-American team that defeated the Green Bay Packers 6–0 in the College All-Star Game in August 1937. He was also selected as a third-team All-American by the Associated Press.

Patanelli was selected by the Pittsburgh Pirates in the 9th round (85th overall pick) of the 1937 NFL draft, making him the first University of Michigan football player selected in the NFL Draft. However, he announced in late January 1937 that he would not play professional football under any circumstances.

== Coaching career ==
Patanelli later served as an athletic coach at Western Michigan University. Among other coaching responsibilities, he was the ends coach and chief scout for the Western Michigan football team in 1944 and from 1948 to 1951.

In July 1952, he returned to the University of Michigan as an assistant coach, assisting with the baseball, basketball and football teams. He was an assistant football coach at Michigan under head coach Bennie Oosterbaan from 1953 to 1958. Patanelli was in charge of the defensive ends in 1953 and was the lead ends coach from 1954 to 1958. In that capacity, he helped develop All-Americans Ron Kramer and Tom Maentz.

== Honors ==
Patanelli has been inducted into the Elkhart County Sports Hall of Fame and the Indiana Football Hall of Fame.
