= Gomer Jones =

American football player, coach, and administrator (1914–1971)

- Jones in 1929

Biographical details
- Born: February 26, 1914; Cleveland, Ohio, U.S.
- Died: March 21, 1971 (aged 57); New York, New York, U.S.

Playing career
- 1933–1935: Ohio State
- Positions: Center, linebacker

Coaching career (HC unless noted)
- 1936–1940: Ohio State (assistant)
- 1941: Martins Ferry HS (OH)
- 1945: St. Mary's Pre-Flight (line)
- 1946: Nebraska (line)
- 1947–1963: Oklahoma (line)
- 1964–1965: Oklahoma

Administrative career (AD unless noted)
- 1964–1971: Oklahoma

Head coaching record
- Overall: 9–11–1 (college)
- Bowls: 0–1

Accomplishments and honors

Awards
- Consensus All-American (1935); First-team All-Big Ten (1935)
- College Football Hall of Fame; Inducted in 1978 (profile)

Gomer Thomas Jones (February 26, 1914 – March 21, 1971) was an American football player, coach, and college athletics administrator. He played college football as a center at Ohio State University from 1933 to 1935. After serving as an assistant coach for 17 years under Bud Wilkinson at the University of Oklahoma, Jones helmed the Sooners for two seasons in 1964 and 1965, compiling a record of 9–11–1. He was also the athletic director at Oklahoma from 1964 until his death in 1971. Jones was inducted into the College Football Hall of Fame as a player in 1978.

== Playing career ==
Jones was one of the outstanding college football players in the 1930s. From 1933 to 1935, he played at Ohio State University as a center on offense and a linebacker on defense. Jones was the anchor of the Buckeyes' offensive line, and was named team MVP following the 1934 and 1935 seasons. In 1935, he was named team captain and was a consensus All-American. Jones was selected by the Chicago Cardinals in the second round of the 1936 NFL draft as the 15th player selected overall, but chose instead to pursue a career in coaching. While at Ohio State, he was a member of the Alpha Rho chapter of the Pi Kappa Alpha fraternity.

== Coaching career ==
Jones served as an assistant to Ohio State head coach Francis Schmidt from 1936 until Schmidt resigned following the 1940 season. In 1946, he served as an assistant coach at the University of Nebraska. His greatest coaching success, however, came as Bud Wilkinson's top assistant at the University of Oklahoma for 17 years, developing 16 All-American linemen as line coach and the architect of Oklahoma's great lines.

Following Wilkinson's retirement in 1964, Jones was promoted to head coach. But after two disappointing seasons with a cumulative record of 9–11–1, he resigned as head coach while staying on as athletic director, which he had also been promoted to in 1964. His teams' mediocre performance may have been caused in part by the dismissal of four of his better players who had signed professional contracts before their college eligibility had expired.

== Death and honors ==
Jones, still the Oklahoma athletic director, died in New York City while attending the 1971 National Invitation Tournament. Jones was posthumously inducted into the College Football Hall of Fame in 1978 as a player. Earlier that year he had been inducted into Ohio State's own Varsity O Hall of Fame.

== Head coaching record ==
=== College ===
| Year | Team | Overall | Conference | Standing | Bowl/playoffs |
|---|---|---|---|---|---|
Oklahoma Sooners (Big Eight Conference) (1964–1965)
| 1964 | Oklahoma | 6–4–1 | 5–1–1 | 2nd | L Gator |
| 1965 | Oklahoma | 3–7 | 3–4 | 5th | |
| Oklahoma: | | 9–11–1 | 8–5–1 | | |
| Total: | | 9–11–1 | | | |
