= Eddie Jankowski =

American football player (1913–1996)

No. 25, 7
- Positions: Fullback, halfback

Personal information
- Born: June 23, 1913; Milwaukee, Wisconsin, U.S.
- Died: July 20, 1996 (aged 83); Madison, Wisconsin, U.S.
- Listed height: 5 ft 9 in (1.75 m)
- Listed weight: 201 lb (91 kg)

Career information
- High school: East Division (Milwaukee)
- College: Wisconsin (1933-1936)
- NFL draft: 1937: 1st round, 9th overall pick

Career history
- Green Bay Packers (1937–1941)

Awards and highlights
- NFL champion (1939); Pro Bowl (1939); Green Bay Packers Hall of Fame

Career NFL statistics
- Rushing yards: 1,002
- Rushing average: 3.6
- Receptions: 2
- Receiving yards: 65
- Total touchdowns: 10
- Stats at Pro Football Reference

Edward Joe Jankowski (June 23, 1913 – July 20, 1996) was an American professional football player. He was selected in the first round of the 1937 NFL draft with the ninth overall pick. He played running back for five seasons for the Green Bay Packers. He was inducted into the Green Bay Packers Hall of Fame in 1984. He played college football at the University of Wisconsin, where he was a member of the Sigma Nu fraternity. Following his playing career, Jankowski was an officer in the United States Navy during World War II before working for Miller Brewing Company and becoming a coach at Whitefish Bay High School.
