= 1936 NFL draft =

National Football League draft

General information
- Date: February 8, 1936
- Location: Ritz-Carlton Hotel in Philadelphia, Pennsylvania

Overview
- 81 total selections in 9 rounds
- League: NFL
- First selection: Jay Berwanger, HB; Philadelphia Eagles
- Most selections (9): each team selected nine players
- Fewest selections (9): each team selected nine players
- Hall of Famers: 4: OT Joe Stydahar; HB Tuffy Leemans; G Dan Fortmann; E Wayne Millner

The 1936 NFL draft was the first draft of National Football League (NFL). It took place on February 8, 1936, at the Ritz-Carlton Hotel in Philadelphia, Pennsylvania. The draft was instituted in an effort to end bidding wars among the league's teams by the arbitrary assignment of negotiating rights to amateur players. It was haphazardly decided that the last place team from the previous season would get the first selection, and the process would continue in reverse order of the standings. Under this structure the Philadelphia Eagles, who finished 1935 at 2–9, would select first.

This was the only draft to have nine rounds; the number increased to ten for the 1937 draft. The first player ever drafted, Jay Berwanger, who had previously been awarded the initial Heisman Trophy, never played in the NFL. His rights were traded by the Philadelphia Eagles to the Chicago Bears, as the Eagles felt they would be unable to meet Berwanger's reported demand of $1,000 per game. The Eagles received tackle Art Buss from the Bears in exchange for Berwanger's rights. George Halas was unable to convince Berwanger to sign with the Bears. After this, Berwanger got a job in rubber sales. Riley Smith, the second pick, was the first player drafted to play in the NFL.

== Breakdown of players selected ==
The following is the breakdown of the 81 players selected:

- 28 backs
- 15 ends
- 14 offensive tackles
- 12 guards
- 6 centers
- 4 fullbacks
- 2 blocking backs
- 1 tailback
- 1 wingback

== Player selections ==
‡	= Hall of Famer (Note: Players are identified as a Hall of Famer if they have been inducted into the Pro Football Hall of Fame.)
†	= Pro Bowler (Note: Players are identified as a Pro Bowler if they were selected for the Pro Bowl at any time in their career.)

Positions key
B	Back	BB	Blocking back	C	Center
E	End	FB	Fullback	G	Guard
OT	Offensive tackle	TB	Tailback	WB	Wingback

Rnd.	Pick	Team	Player	Pos.	College	Notes
1	1	Philadelphia Eagles	Jay Berwanger	HB	Chicago	First winner of the Heisman Trophy award in 1935
1	2	Boston Redskins	Riley Smith	QB	Alabama	
1	3	Pittsburgh Pirates	Bill Shakespeare	HB	Notre Dame	
1	4	Brooklyn Dodgers	Dick Crayne	FB	Iowa	
1	5	Chicago Cardinals	Jimmy Lawrence ^{†}	WB	TCU	
1	6	Chicago Bears	Joe Stydahar^{‡}^{†}	T	West Virginia	
1	7	Green Bay Packers	Russ Letlow ^{†}	G	San Francisco	
1	8	Detroit Lions	Sid Wagner	G	Michigan State	
1	9	New York Giants	Art Lewis	T	Ohio	
2	10	Philadelphia Eagles	John McCauley	B	Rice	
2	11	Boston Redskins	Keith Topping	E	Stanford	
2	12	Pittsburgh Pirates	Len Barnum	B	West Virginia Wesleyan	
2	13	Brooklyn Dodgers	Babe LeVoir	B	Minnesota	
2	14	Chicago Bears	Ed Michaels	G	Villanova	
2	15	Chicago Cardinals	Gomer Jones	C	Ohio State	
2	16	Green Bay Packers	Dub Wheeler	T	Oklahoma	
2	17	Detroit Lions	Chuck Cheshire	B	UCLA	
2	18	New York Giants	Tuffy Leemans^{‡}^{†}	FB	George Washington	
3	19	Philadelphia Eagles	Wes Muller	C	Stanford	
3	20	Boston Redskins	Ed Smith	BB	NYU	
3	21	Pittsburgh Pirates	Bobby Grayson	B	Stanford	
3	22	Brooklyn Dodgers	Wagner Jorgensen	C	St. Mary's (CA)	
3	23	Chicago Cardinals	Eddie Erdelatz	E	St. Mary's (CA)	
3	24	Chicago Bears	George Roscoe	B	Minnesota	
3	25	Green Bay Packers	Bernie Scherer	E	Nebraska	
3	26	Detroit Lions	Andy Pilney	B	Notre Dame	
3	27	New York Giants	Frank Loebs	E	Purdue	
4	28	Philadelphia Eagles	Bill Wallace	B	Rice	
4	29	Boston Redskins	Paul Tangora	G	Northwestern	
4	30	Pittsburgh Pirates	Truman Spain	T	SMU	
4	31	Brooklyn Dodgers	Bear Bryant	E	Alabama	
4	32	Chicago Bears	Bob Allman	E	Michigan State	
4	33	Chicago Cardinals	Ed Brett	E	Washington State	
4	34	Green Bay Packers	Theron Ward	B	Idaho	
4	35	Detroit Lions	Sheldon Beise	B	Minnesota	
4	36	New York Giants	Gene Rose	E	Tennessee	
5	37	Philadelphia Eagles	Harry Shuford	B	SMU	
5	38	Boston Redskins	Wilson Groseclose	T	TCU	
5	39	Pittsburgh Pirates	Dick Sandefur	FB	Purdue	
5	40	Brooklyn Dodgers	Bob Wilson	TB	SMU	
5	41	Chicago Cardinals	Stan Riordan	E	Oregon	
5	42	Chicago Bears	Vern Oech	G	Minnesota	
5	43	Green Bay Packers	Darrell Lester	C	TCU	
5	44	Detroit Lions	Kavanaugh Francis	C	Alabama	
5	45	New York Giants	Edward A. Jontos	G	Syracuse	
6	46	Philadelphia Eagles	Al Barabas	B	Columbia	
6	47	Boston Redskins	Larry Lutz	T	California	
6	48	Pittsburgh Pirates	Maurice Orr	T	SMU	
6	49	Brooklyn Dodgers	Joe Maniaci ^{†}	B	Fordham	
6	50	Chicago Bears	Ted Christofferson	B	Washington State	
6	51	Chicago Cardinals	Ettore Antonini	E	Indiana	
6	52	Green Bay Packers	Bob Reynolds	T	Stanford	
6	53	Detroit Lions	Abe Mickal	B	LSU	
6	54	New York Giants	Gus Durner	T	Duke	
7	55	Philadelphia Eagles	Jac Weller	G	Princeton	
7	56	Boston Redskins	Don Irwin	FB	Colgate	
7	57	Pittsburgh Pirates	Marty Peters	E	Notre Dame	
7	58	Brooklyn Dodgers	Herb Schreiber	B	St. Mary's (CA)	
7	59	Chicago Cardinals	Tack Dennis	B	Tulsa	
7	60	Chicago Bears	Dick Smith	T	Minnesota	
7	61	Green Bay Packers	Wally Fromhart	B	Notre Dame	
7	62	Detroit Lions	Charles Wasicek	T	Colgate	
7	63	New York Giants	Bob Peeples	T	Marquette	
8	64	Philadelphia Eagles	Pepper Constable	B	Princeton	
8	65	Boston Redskins	Wayne Millner^{‡}	E	Notre Dame	
8	66	Pittsburgh Pirates	Ed Karpowich	T	Catholic University	
8	67	Brooklyn Dodgers	Bones Hamilton	B	Stanford	
8	68	Chicago Bears	John Sylvester	E	Rice	
8	69	Chicago Cardinals	Ross Carter	G	Oregon	
8	70	Green Bay Packers	Wally Cruice	B	Northwestern	
8	71	Detroit Lions	Dale Rennebohm	C	Minnesota	
8	72	New York Giants	Dale Heekin	B	Ohio State	
9	73	Philadelphia Eagles	Paul Pauk	B	Princeton	
9	74	Boston Redskins	Marcel Saunders	G	Loyola (CA)	
9	75	Pittsburgh Pirates	Joe Meglen	B	Georgetown	
9	76	Brooklyn Dodgers	Jim Moscrip	E	Stanford	
9	77	Chicago Cardinals	Niels Larsen	T	Stanford	
9	78	Chicago Bears	Dan Fortmann^{‡}^{†}	G	Colgate	
9	79	Green Bay Packers	J. C. Wetsel	G	SMU	
9	80	Detroit Lions	Bob Train	E	Yale	
9	81	New York Giants	Phil Flanagan	G	Holy Cross	

== Hall of Famers ==
- Dan Fortmann, guard from Colgate taken 9th round 78th overall by the Chicago Bears.

Inducted: Professional Football Hall of Fame class of 1965.

- Joe Stydahar, tackle from West Virginia taken 1st round 6th overall by the Chicago Bears.

Inducted: Professional Football Hall of Fame class of 1967.

- Wayne Millner, end from Notre Dame taken 8th round 65th overall by the Boston Redskins.

Inducted: Professional Football Hall of Fame class of 1968.

- Alphonse “Tuffy” Leemans, back from George Washington University taken 2nd Round 18th overall by the New York Giants.

Inducted: Professional Football Hall of Fame class of 1978.

== Notable undrafted players ==
†	= Pro Bowler

Original NFL team	Player	Pos.	College	Notes
Chicago Bears	Ray Nolting	HB	Cincinnati	
Philadelphia Eagles	David Smukler	FB	Temple	

== Schools with multiple draft selections ==
Selections	Schools
7	Stanford
6	Minnesota
5	Notre Dame, SMU
3	Alabama, Colgate, Princeton, Rice, St. Mary's, TCU
2	Michigan State, Northwestern, Ohio State, Oregon, Purdue, Washington State
