= 1936 Philadelphia Eagles season =

NFL team season

- Owner: Bert Bell
- Head coach: Bert Bell
- Home stadium: Philadelphia Municipal Stadium

Results
- Record: 1–11
- Division place: 5th NFL Eastern
- Playoffs: Did not qualify

The 1936 Philadelphia Eagles season was their fourth in the National Football League (NFL). The team failed to improve on their previous output of 2–9, winning only one game. After starting the season with a win, the Eagles were shut out in six of their next eight games and finished the season 1–11, worst in the NFL.

== Offseason ==
- The Eagles moved their training camp, after the first 2 years in Atlantic City, New Jersey and last year in Philadelphia at the Chestnut Hill Academy, to Temple University in Philadelphia. The Eagles would place 7 former Temple Owls on the team
- Eagles would move games to larger Philadelphia Municipal Stadium.
- Bert Bell convinced the league to hold a college players draft to stock league with talent.

=== NFL draft ===
The 1936 NFL draft was held in Philadelphia and The Eagles had the first pick. Jay Berwanger a Halfback from the University of Chicago was selected. He selected not to play in the NFL. Later in year he was traded to the Chicago Bears and still refused to play NFL football.

=== Player selections ===
The table shows the Eagles selections and what picks they had that were traded away and the team that ended up with that pick It is possible the Eagles' pick ended up with this team via another team that the Eagles made a trade with. Not shown are acquired picks that the Eagles traded away. None of their draft picks ever played in the NFL.

1936 Philadelphia Eagles draft
Round	Pick	Player	Position	College	Notes
1	1	Jay Berwanger	Halfback	Chicago	1935 Heisman Trophy winner
2	10	John McCauley	Back	Rice	
3	19	Wes Muller	Center	Stanford	
4	28	Bill Wallace	Back	Rice	
5	37	Henry Shuford	Back	SMU	
6	46	Al Barabas	Back	Columbia	
7	55	Jac Weller	Guard	Princeton	
8	64	Pepper Constable	Back	Princeton	
9	73	Paul Pauk	Back	Princeton	
Made roster

== Regular season ==
=== Schedule ===
Game	Date	Opponent	Result	Record	Venue	Attendance	Recap	Sources
1	September 13	**New York Giants**	**W** 10–7	1–0	Philadelphia Municipal Stadium	20,000	Recap	
2	September 20	**Boston Redskins**	**L** 3–26	1–1	Philadelphia Municipal Stadium	20,000	Recap	
3	September 27	Chicago Bears	**L** 0–17	1–2	Philadelphia Municipal Stadium	25,000	Recap	
4	October 4	at **Brooklyn Dodgers**	**L** 0–18	1–3	Ebbets Field	10,000	Recap	
5	October 11	Detroit Lions	**L** 0–23	1–4	Philadelphia Municipal Stadium	15,000	Recap	
6	October 14	at **Pittsburgh Pirates**	**L** 0–17	1–5	Forbes Field	10,042	Recap	
7	October 18	at **Boston Redskins**	**L** 7–17	1–6	Fenway Park	4,000	Recap	
8	October 25	at **New York Giants**	**L** 17–21	1–7	Polo Grounds	15,000	Recap	
—	Bye							
9	November 5	**Pittsburgh Pirates**	**L** 0–6	1–8	Point Stadium	7,891	Recap	
10	November 8	at Chicago Cardinals	**L** 0–13	1–9	Wrigley Field	1,500	Recap	
—	Bye							
11	November 22	Chicago Bears	**L** 7–28	1–10	Philadelphia Municipal Stadium	10,000	Recap	
12	November 29	**Brooklyn Dodgers**	**L** 7–13	1–11	Philadelphia Municipal Stadium	5,000	Recap	
Note: Intra-division opponents are in **bold** text.

== Standings ==
NFL Eastern Division
	W	L	T	PCT	DIV	PF	PA	STK
Boston Redskins	7	5	0	.583	6–2	149	110	W3
Pittsburgh Pirates	6	6	0	.500	6–1	98	187	L3
New York Giants	5	6	1	.455	3–3–1	115	163	L1
Brooklyn Dodgers	3	8	1	.273	2–5–1	92	161	L1
Philadelphia Eagles	1	11	0	.083	1–7	51	206	L11

Note: Tie games were not officially counted in the standings until 1972.

== Roster ==
(All time List of Philadelphia Eagles players in franchise history)

The Eagles had 12 rookies and 8 players with 2 years experience or less on their roster. Eleven of the 26 members on the team went to school within 15 miles of Philadelphia.

NO.	Player	AGE	POS	GP	GS	WT	HT	YRS	College
	Bert Bell	41	Coach	_{1936 record} 1–11	_{NFL-Eagles Lifetime} 1–11			1st	Pennsylvania
	Reds Bassman	23	HB	8	0	180	5–11	Rookie	Ursinus
	Bill Brian	23	T-C-LB	9	5	210	6–2	1	Gonzaga
	Art Buss	25	T	12	12	219	6–3	2	Michigan State
	Joe Carter	26	E	9	9	201	6–1	3	Austin, SMU
	Glenn Frey	24	B	12	8	193	5–10	Rookie	Temple
	Rudy Gollomb	26	G	4	0	205	5–11	Rookie	Carroll (WI), Wisconsin
	Swede Hanson	29	B	12	10	192	6–1	5	Temple
	Don Jackson	23	TB-DB	10	2	184	5–11	Rookie	North Carolina
	Carl Kane	23	B	1	0	195	5–11	Rookies	St. Louis
	John Kusko	22	B	12	1	194	5–11	Rookie	Temple
	Jim Leonard	26	B	10	10	204	6–0	2	Notre Dame
	Jim MacMurdo	27	T-G	9	9	209	6–1	4	Pittsburgh
	Eggs Manske	24	E	12	11	185	6–0	1	Northwestern
	Walt Masters	29	B	2	0	192	5–10	Rookie	Pennsylvania
	Forrest McPherson	25	G-C-T	12	11	233	5–11	1	Nebraska
	George Mulligan	22	E	9	0	198	6–1	Rookie	Catholic
	Max Padlow	24	E	1	0	199	6–1	1	Ohio State
	Joe Pilconis	25	E	2	4	189	6–1	2	Temple
	Joe Pivarnik	24	G	6	0	217	5–9	Rookie	Notre Dame
	Hank Reese	27	C-G	10	10	214	5–11	3	Temple
	Jim Russell	28	G-T	11	10	210	5–11	Rookie	Temple
	Dave Smukler	22	FB-LB	10	8	226	6–1	Rookie	Missouri, Temple
	Pete Stevens	27	C	4	2	215	6–0	Rookie	Temple
	Stumpy Thomason	30	B	12	9	189	5–7	6	Georgia Tech
	Vince Zizak	28	G-T	10	3	208	5–8	2	Villanova
	26 Players; Team Average	25.3		12		202.4	5–11.5	1.3	
