= 1936 Chicago Cardinals season =

American football team season

- Head coach: Milan Creighton
- Home stadium: Wrigley Field

Results
- Record: 3–8–1
- Division place: 4th NFL Western
- Playoffs: Did not qualify

The 1936 Chicago Cardinals season marked the team's 17th year in the National Football League (NFL). The team failed to improve on their previous output of 6–4–2, winning only three games. Playing their first seven games on the road, they failed to qualify for the playoffs for the 11th consecutive season.

== NFL draft ==
1936 Chicago Cardinals draft
Round	Pick	Player	Position	College	Notes
1	5	Jimmy Lawrence *	WB	TCU	
2	15	Gomer Jones	C	Ohio State	
3	23	Eddie Erdelatz	E	Saint Mary's (CA)	
4	33	Jeep Brett	E	Washington State	
5	41	Stan Riordan	E	Oregon	
6	51	Ettore Antonini	E	Indiana	
7	59	Tack Dennis	B	Tulsa	
8	69	Ross Carter	G	Oregon	
9	77	Niels Larsen	T	Stanford	
Made roster * Made at least one Pro Bowl during career

== Schedule ==
Game	Date	Opponent	Result	Record	Venue	Attendance	Recap	Sources
1	September 13	at **Green Bay Packers**	**L** 7–10	0–1	City Stadium	8,900	Recap	
—	Bye							
2	September 28	at **Detroit Lions**	**L** 0–39	0–2	University of Detroit Stadium	15,000	Recap	
3	October 4	at **Green Bay Packers**	**L** 0–24	0–3	Wisconsin State Fair Park	11,000	Recap	
4	October 11	at **Chicago Bears**	**L** 3–7	0–4	Wrigley Field	16,288	Recap	
5	October 18	at New York Giants	**L** 6–14	0–5	Polo Grounds	17,000	Recap	
6	October 25	at Brooklyn Dodgers	**L** 0–9	0–6	Ebbets Field	20,000	Recap	
7	November 1	at Boston Redskins	**L** 13–10	0–7	Fenway Park	7,000	Recap	
8	November 8	Philadelphia Eagles	**W** 13–0	1–7	Wrigley Field	1,500	Recap	
9	November 15	Pittsburgh Pirates	**W** 14–6	2–7	Wrigley Field	3,856	Recap	
10	November 22	Detroit Lions	**L** 7–14	2–8	Wrigley Field	7,579	Recap	
11	November 29	**Chicago Bears**	**W** 14–7	3–8	Wrigley Field	13,704	Recap	
12	December 6	**Green Bay Packers**	**T** 0–0	3–8–1	Wrigley Field	4,793	Recap	
Note: Intra-division opponents are in **bold** text.

== Roster ==
1936 Chicago Cardinals final roster
Backs: 25 Mule Dowell FB/LB; 32 George Grosvenor RB/CB/S; 24 Clarence Kellogg FB/LB/K; 11 Jimmy Lawrence RB/CB; 48 Mike Mikulak RB/S; 43 Al Nichelini RB/CB; 21 Hal Pangle RB/CB/S; 12 Pug Vaughan RB/CB/S	Linemen/Linebackers: 22 Conway Baker T/DT; 23 Tony Blazine T/DT; 28 Ross Carter G/DG/T/DT; 47 Bree Cuppoletti G/DG; 31 Harry Field T/DT; 18 Bernie Hughes C/LB; 46 Bert Pearson C/LB; 49 Jack Robinson T/DT; 27 Howie Tipton G/DG; 44 Billy Volok G/DG	Ends/Receivers: 35 Milan Creighton; 45 Versil Deskin; 20 Bob Neuman; 40 Bill Smith K; 42 Billy Wilson; Reserve: 26 Dub Miller T/DT; 33 Doug Russell RB/CB; rookies in italics

== Standings ==
NFL Western Division
	W	L	T	PCT	DIV	PF	PA	STK
Green Bay Packers	10	1	1	.909	5–1–1	248	118	T1
Chicago Bears	9	3	0	.750	3–3	222	94	L2
Detroit Lions	8	4	0	.667	3–3	235	102	W1
Chicago Cardinals	3	8	1	.273	1–5–1	74	143	T1

Note: Tie games were not officially counted in the standings until 1972.
