= List of NFL team playoff records =

This is a list of playoff records set by various teams in various categories in the National Football League during the Super Bowl Era.

== Wins ==
- Most Postseason Games Won, All-Time, 40

New England Patriots, 1970–2026
San Francisco 49ers, 1949–2026

- Most Postseason Home Games Won, All-Time, 27

San Francisco 49ers, 1949-2024.

- Most Postseason Road Games Won, All-Time, 11

Green Bay Packers, 1944–2016

- Most Consecutive Postseason Games Won, 10

New England Patriots, 2001, 2003-2005

- Most Consecutive Postseason Home Games Won, 13

Green Bay Packers, 1939–2002

- Most Consecutive Postseason Road Games Won, 5

New York Giants, 2007, 2011

- Highest All-Time Postseason Winning Percentage, 0.633

New England Patriots

== Losses ==
- Most Postseason Games Lost, All-Time, 32

Minnesota Vikings

- Longest Losing Streak, 9 games

Detroit Lions, 1991, 1993–1995, 1997, 1999, 2011, 2014, 2016

- Most Postseason Home Losses, All-Time, 13

Pittsburgh Steelers: 1947–2025

- Most Postseason Road Losses, All-Time, 19

Minnesota Vikings: 1968–2020

== Scoring ==
- Most Points, Single Postseason, 145

Philadelphia Eagles, 2024

- Most Points per Game, Single Postseason (min 2 games), 43.6

San Francisco 49ers, 1994

- Most Points, Single Team, Game, 73

Chicago Bears vs Washington Redskins, Dec 8, 1940 (NFL Championship Game)

- Most Points, Both Teams, Game, 96

Arizona Cardinals (51) vs Green Bay Packers (45), Jan 10, 2010 (Wild Card Round)

- Fewest Points, Both Teams, Game, 5

Dallas Cowboys (5) vs Detroit Lions (0), Dec 26, 1970 (Divisional Round)

- Most Points, Shutout Victory, Game, 73

Chicago Bears vs Washington Redskins, Dec 8, 1940 (NFL Championship Game)

- Fewest Points, Shutout Victory, Game, 5

Dallas Cowboys vs Detroit Lions, Dec 26, 1970 (Divisional Round)

- Most Points Overcome to Win Game, 32

Buffalo Bills vs Houston Oilers, Jan 3, 1993 (trailed 3–35, won 41–38, OT, Wild Card Round)

- Most Points, First Half, 41

Buffalo Bills vs Los Angeles Raiders, Jan 20, 1991 (AFC Championship Game)
Jacksonville Jaguars vs Miami Dolphins, Jan 15, 2000 (Divisional Round)

- Most Points, Second Half, 45

Chicago Bears vs Washington Redskins, Dec 8, 1940 (NFL Championship Game)

- Most Points, One Half, 45

Chicago Bears vs Washington Redskins, Dec 8, 1940 (NFL Championship Game)

- Most Points, Both Teams, First Half, 52

Houston Texans (24) vs Kansas City Chiefs (28), Jan 12, 2020 (Divisional Round)

- Most Points, Both Teams, Second Half, 56

Green Bay Packers (35) vs Arizona Cardinals (21), Jan 10, 2010 (Wild Card Round)

- Most Points, Both Teams, One Half, 56

Green Bay Packers (35) vs Arizona Cardinals (21), Jan 10, 2010 (Wild Card Round)

- Most Points, First Quarter, 28

Oakland Raiders vs Houston Oilers, Dec 21, 1969 (Divisional Round)
Cleveland Browns vs Pittsburgh Steelers, Jan 10, 2021 (Wild Card Round)

- Most Points, Second Quarter, 35

Washington Redskins vs Denver Broncos, Jan 31, 1988 (Super Bowl XXII)

- Most Points, Third Quarter, 28

Buffalo Bills vs Houston Oilers, Jan 3, 1993 (Wild Card Round)

- Most Points, Fourth Quarter, 27

New York Giants vs Chicago Bears, Dec 9, 1934 (NFL Championship Game)

- Most Points, Fourth Quarter, since AFL/NFL Merger, 26

Philadelphia Eagles vs New Orleans Saints, Jan 3, 1993 (Wild Card Round)

- Most Points, One Quarter, 35

Washington Redskins vs Denver Broncos, January 31, 1988 (Super Bowl XXII)

- Highest Point Differential, Game, 73

Chicago Bears (73) vs Washington Redskins (0), Dec 8, 1940 (NFL Championship Game)

- Highest Point Differential, Season (min 2 games), 100

San Francisco 49ers, 1989–90 (126–26 over three games)

=== Touchdowns ===
- Most Touchdowns, Game, 11

Chicago Bears vs Washington Redskins, Dec 8, 1940 (NFL Championship Game)

- Most Touchdowns, Both Teams, Game, 13

Arizona Cardinals (7) vs Green Bay Packers (6), Jan 10, 2010 (Wild Card Round)

=== Field Goals ===
- Most Field Goals Attempted, Game, 6

Oakland Raiders vs Houston Oilers, Dec 31, 1967 (AFL Championship Game)
Los Angeles Rams vs Dallas Cowboys, Dec 23, 1973 (Divisional Round)
Cleveland Browns vs New York Jets, Jan 3, 1987 (OT, Divisional Round)
New York Giants vs San Francisco 49ers, Jan 20, 1991 (NFC Championship Game)
Buffalo Bills vs Miami Dolphins, Jan 17, 1992 (AFC Championship Game)
St. Louis Rams vs Carolina Panthers, Jan 10, 2004 (OT, Divisional Round)
Pittsburgh Steelers vs Kansas City Chiefs, Jan 15, 2017 (Divisional Round)

- Most Field Goals Attempted, Both Teams, Game, 11

St. Louis Rams (6) vs Carolina Panthers (5), Jan 10, 2004 (OT, Divisional Round)

- Most Field Goals, Game, 6

Pittsburgh Steelers vs Kansas City Chiefs, Jan 15, 2017 (Divisional Round) Chris Boswell

- Most Field Goals, Both Teams, Game, 8

New York Giants (5) vs San Francisco 49ers (3), Jan 20, 1991 (NFC Championship Game)
St. Louis Rams (5) vs Carolina Panthers (3), Jan 10, 2004 (OT, Divisional Round)

=== Safeties ===
- Most Safeties, Game, 1

In many games; last time: Houston Texans (1) vs Kansas City Chiefs (0), Jan 18, 2025 (Divisional Round)

- Most Safeties, Both Teams, Game, 1

In many games; last time: Houston Texans (1) vs Kansas City Chiefs (0), Jan 18, 2025 (Divisional Round)

=== Shutouts ===
- Most Postseason Shutout Games Won, All–Time, 3

Chicago Bears: 1940, 1985 (twice)
Dallas Cowboys: 1970, 1978, 1981
Miami Dolphins: 1971, 1982, 1992
New York Giants: 1958, 1986, 2000
Philadelphia Eagles: 1947, 1948, 1949

- Most Postseason Shutout Games Won, Single Season, 2

Chicago Bears, 1985

- Most Consecutive Shutout Games, 2

Philadelphia Eagles, 1948, 1949
Chicago Bears, 1985–86

- Most Postseason Losses by Shutout, All–Time, 5

New York Giants: 1939, 1943, 1961, 1985, 2005

== Offense ==
=== Yards Gained ===
- Most Yards Gained, Game, 626

New Orleans Saints vs Detroit Lions, Jan 7, 2012 (Wild Card Round)

- Fewest Yards Gained, Game, 78

Arizona Cardinals vs Carolina Panthers, Jan 3, 2015 (Wild Card Round)

- Most Yards Gained, Both Teams, Game, 1,151

New England Patriots (613) vs Philadelphia Eagles (538), Feb 4, 2018 (Super Bowl LII)

- Fewest Yards Gained, Both Teams, Game, 336

New York Giants (154) vs Cleveland Browns (182), Dec 17, 1950 (Divisional Round)

=== Passing ===
- Most Passes Attempted, Game, 68

Pittsburgh Steelers vs Cleveland Browns, Jan 10, 2021 (Wild Card Round)

- Fewest Passes Attempted, Game, 5

Detroit Lions vs New York Giants, Dec 15, 1935 (NFL Championship Game)

- Most Passes Attempted, Both Teams, Game, 105

New Orleans Saints (63) vs San Francisco 49ers (42), Jan 14, 2012 (Divisional Round)

- Fewest Passes Attempted, Both Teams, Game, 18

Detroit Lions (5) vs New York Giants (13), Dec 15, 1935 (NFL Championship Game)

- Most Passes Completed, Game, 47

Pittsburgh Steelers vs Cleveland Browns, Jan 10, 2021 (Wild Card Round)

- Fewest Passes Completed, Game, 2

Detroit Lions vs New York Giants, Dec 15, 1935 (NFL Championship Game)
Philadelphia Eagles vs Chicago Cardinals, Dec 19, 1948 (NFL Championship Game)

- Most Passes Completed, Both Teams, Game, 68

Pittsburgh Steelers (47) vs Cleveland Browns (21), Jan 10, 2021 (Wild Card Round)

- Fewest Passes Completed, Both Teams, Game, 5

Chicago Cardinals (3) vs Philadelphia Eagles (2), Dec 19, 1948 (NFL Championship Game)

- Most Yards Gained, Passing, Game, 506

New England Patriots, Feb 4, 2018 (Super Bowl LII)

- Fewest Yards Gained, Passing, Game, 7

Chicago Cardinals vs Philadelphia Eagles, Dec 19, 1948 (NFL Championship Game)

- Most Yards Gained, Passing, Both Teams, Game, 881

New England Patriots (506) vs Philadelphia Eagles (375), Feb 4, 2018 (Super Bowl LII)

- Fewest Yards Gained, Passing, Both Teams, Game, 42

Chicago Cardinals (35) vs Philadelphia Eagles (7), Dec 19, 1948 (NFL Championship Game)
New York Giants (13) vs Cleveland Browns (29), Dec 17, 1950 (NFL Championship Game)

- Most Times Sacked, Game, 9

Kansas City Chiefs vs Buffalo Bills, Jan 1, 1967 (AFL Championship Game)
Chicago Bears vs San Francisco 49ers, Jan 6, 1985 (NFC Championship Game)
New York Jets vs Cleveland Browns, Jan 3, 1987 (OT, Divisional Round)
Houston Oilers vs Kansas City Chiefs, Jan 16, 1994 (Divisional Round)
Cincinnati Bengals vs Tennessee Titans, Jan 22, 2022 (Divisional Round)

- Most Times Sacked, Both Teams, Game, 13

Kansas City Chiefs (9) vs Buffalo Bills (4), Jan 1, 1967 (AFL Championship Game)
New York Jets (9) vs Cleveland Browns (4), Jan 3, 1987 (OT, Divisional Round)

- Highest Completion Percentage, Game (minimum 20 attempts), 92.9

New England Patriots vs Jacksonville Jaguars, Jan 12, 2008 (26/28 passing, Divisional Round)

- Lowest Completion Percentage, Game (minimum 20 attempts), 18.5

Tampa Bay Buccaneers vs Los Angeles Rams, Jan 6, 1980 (5/27 passing, NFC Championship Game)

- Most Touchdowns, Passing, Game, 6

Oakland Raiders vs Houston Oilers, Dec 21, 1969 (Divisional Round)
San Francisco 49ers vs San Diego Chargers, Jan 29, 1995 (Super Bowl XXIX)
New England Patriots vs Denver Broncos, Jan 14, 2012 (Divisional Round)

- Most Touchdowns, Passing, Both Teams, Game, 9

Minnesota Vikings (4) vs St. Louis Rams (5), Jan 16, 2000 (Divisional Round)
Green Bay Packers (4) vs Arizona Cardinals (5), Jan 10, 2010 (OT, Wild Card Round)

=== Rushing ===
- Most Rushing Attempts, Game, 65

Detroit Lions vs New York Giants, Dec 15, 1935 (NFL Championship Game)

- Fewest Rushing Attempts, Game, 8

Miami Dolphins vs San Diego Chargers, Jan 8, 1995 (Divisional Round)

- Most Rushing Attempts, Both Teams, Game, 109

Detroit Lions (65) vs New York Giants (44), Dec 15, 1935 (NFL Championship Game)

- Fewest Rushing Attempts, Both Teams, Game, 32

Kansas City Chiefs (18) vs Houston Oilers (14), Jan 16, 1994 (Divisional Round)

- Most Yards Gained Rushing, Game, 382

Chicago Bears vs Washington Redskins, Dec 8, 1940 (NFL Championship Game)

- Fewest Yards Gained Rushing, Game, −4

Detroit Lions vs Green Bay Packers, Dec 31, 1994 (Wild Card Round)

- Most Yards Gained Rushing, Both Teams, Game, 430

Los Angeles Rams (92) vs Dallas Cowboys (338), Dec 28, 1980 (Wild Card Round)

- Fewest Yards Gained Rushing, Both Teams, Game, 77

Detroit Lions (–4) vs Green Bay Packers (81), Dec 31, 1994 (Wild Card Round)

- Highest Average Gain, Rushing, Game, 9.94

San Diego Chargers vs Boston Patriots, Jan 5, 1964 (AFL Championship Game)

- Lowest Average Gain, Rushing, Game, −0.27

Detroit Lions vs Green Bay Packers, Dec 31, 1994 (Wild Card Round)

- Most Touchdowns, Rushing, Game, 7

Philadelphia Eagles vs Washington Commanders, Jan 26. 2025 (NFC Championship Game)

Chicago Bears vs Washington Redskins, Dec 8, 1940 (NFL Championship Game)

- Most Touchdowns, Rushing, Both Teams, Game, 8

Philadelphia Eagles (7) vs Washington Commanders (1), Jan 26. 2025 (NFL Championship Game)

=== First Downs ===
- Most First Downs, Game, 37

New England Patriots vs Atlanta Falcons, Feb 5, 2017 (OT, Super Bowl LI)

- Fewest First Downs, Game, 6

Chicago Cardinals vs Philadelphia Eagles, Dec 19, 1948 (NFL Championship Game)

- Most First Downs, Both Teams, Game, 62

Green Bay Packers (32) vs Arizona Cardinals (30), Jan 10, 2010 (OT, Wild Card Round)

- Fewest First Downs, Both Teams, Game, 15

Green Bay Packers (7) vs Boston Redskins (8), Dec 13, 1936 (NFL Championship Game)

- Most First Downs, Rushing, Game, 19

Dallas Cowboys vs Los Angeles Rams, Dec 28, 1980 (Wild Card Round)

- Fewest First Downs, Rushing, Game, 0

Los Angeles Rams vs Philadelphia Eagles, Dec 18, 1949 (NFL Championship Game)
Buffalo Bills vs Boston Patriots, Dec 28, 1963 (Divisional Round)
Oakland Raiders vs Pittsburgh Steelers, Dec 29, 1974 (AFC Championship Game)
New Orleans Saints vs Minnesota Vikings, Jan 3, 1988 (Wild Card Round)
Los Angeles Rams vs San Francisco 49ers, Jan 14, 1990 (NFC Championship Game)
Chicago Bears vs New York Giants, Jan 13, 1991 (Divisional Round)
Indianapolis Colts vs Pittsburgh Steelers, Dec 29, 1996 (Wild Card Round)
Seattle Seahawks vs Miami Dolphins, Jan 9, 2000 (Wild Card Round)
Miami Dolphins vs Jacksonville Jaguars, Jan 15, 2000 (Divisional Round)
Miami Dolphins vs Oakland Raiders, Jan 6, 2001 (Divisional Round)
Baltimore Ravens vs Pittsburgh Steelers, Jan 20, 2002 (Divisional Round)
Indianapolis Colts vs New England Patriots, Jan 16, 2005 (Divisional Round)
Philadelphia Eagles vs Dallas Cowboys, Jan 9, 2010 (Wild Card Round)

- Most First Downs, Rushing, Both Teams, Game, 26

Los Angeles Raiders (12) vs Buffalo Bills (14), Jan 20, 1991 (AFC Championship Game)

- Fewest First Downs, Rushing, Both Teams, Game, 2

St. Louis Rams (1) vs New Orleans Saints (1), Dec 30, 2000 (Wild Card Round)

- Most First Downs, Passing, Game, 26

New England Patriots vs Atlanta Falcons, Feb 5, 2017 (OT, Super Bowl LI)

- Fewest First Downs, Passing, Game, 0

Philadelphia Eagles vs Chicago Cardinals, Dec 19, 1948 (NFL Championship Game)

- Most First Downs, Passing, Both Teams, Game, 42

San Diego Chargers (21) vs Miami Dolphins (21), Jan 2, 1982 (OT, Divisional Round)
Cleveland Browns (18) vs Pittsburgh Steelers (24), Jan 5, 2002 (Wild Card Round)

- Fewest First Downs, Passing, Both Teams, Game, 2

Chicago Cardinals (2) vs Philadelphia Eagles (0), Dec 19, 1948 (NFL Championship Game)

- Most First Downs, Penalty, Game, 7

New England Patriots vs Oakland Raiders, Dec 18, 1976 (Wild Card Round)
Tennessee Titans vs Oakland Raiders, Jan 19, 2002 (AFC Championship Game)

- Most First Downs, Penalty, Both Teams, Game, 10

Tennessee Titans (7) vs Oakland Raiders (3), Jan 19, 2002 (AFC Championship Game)

== Defense ==
=== Points Allowed ===
- Fewest Points Allowed (min 3 games), 10

Chicago Bears, 1985–86

- Fewest Points Allowed (min 4 games), 23

Baltimore Ravens, 2000–01

- Most Points Allowed, Season, 2 games, 90

Arizona Cardinals, 2009–10

- Most Points Allowed, Season, 3 games, 99

Denver Broncos, 1989–90

- Most Points Allowed, Season, 4 games 103

Buffalo Bills, 1992–93

- Most Shutouts, Season, 2

Chicago Bears, 1985–86

- Most Points Allowed per Game (min 2 games), 45

Arizona Cardinals, 2009–10

=== Touchdowns Allowed ===
- Fewest Rushing Touchdowns Allowed, Season, 1

San Francisco 49ers, 2011–12

- Fewest Rushing Touchdowns Allowed, Season, 0

Chicago Bears, 1985–86

== Special teams ==
=== Punting ===
- Most Punts, Game, 14

New York Jets vs Cleveland Browns, Jan 3, 1987 (2OT, Divisional Round)

- Fewest Punts, Game, 0
- Most Punts, Both Teams, Game, 23

New York Giants (13) vs Chicago Bears (10), Dec 17, 1933 (NFL Championship Game)

- Fewest Punts, Both Teams, Game, 0

Indianapolis Colts (0) vs Kansas City Chiefs (0), Jan 11, 2004 (Divisional Round)

- Highest Average Distance, Punting, Game (at least four punts), 56.0 yards

Oakland Raiders vs San Diego Chargers, Jan 11, 1981 (AFC Championship Game)

- Lowest Average Distance, Punting, Game (at least four punts), 24.9 yards

Washington Redskins vs Chicago Bears, Dec 12, 1937 (NFL Championship Game)

=== Punt Returns ===
- Most Punt Returns, Game, 8

Green Bay Packers vs New York Giants, Dec 17, 1944 (NFL Championship Game)

- Most Punt Returns, Both Teams, Game, 13

Houston Oilers (7) vs Oakland Raiders (6), Dec 28, 1980 (Wild Card Round)

- Most Yards, Punt Returns, Game, 155

Dallas Cowboys, 1967

- Fewest Yards, Punt Returns, Game, –10

Green Bay Packers, 1965

- Most Yards, Punt Returns, Both Teams, Game, 166

Cleveland Browns (11) vs Dallas Cowboys (155), Dec 31, 1967 (1967 NFL Championship Game)
Baltimore Ravens (99) vs Pittsburgh Steelers (67), Jan 20, 2002 (Divisional Round)

- Fewest Yards, Punt Returns, Both Teams, Game, –9

Green Bay Packers (0) vs Dallas Cowboys (–9), Jan 1, 1967 (NFL Championship Game)

- Most Touchdowns, Punt Returns, Game, 1

by many teams; last: Denver Broncos vs Baltimore Ravens, Jan 12, 2013 (OT, Divisional Round)

=== Kick Returns ===
- Most Kickoff Returns, Game, 10

Los Angeles Rams vs Washington Redskins, Jan 1, 1984 (Divisional Round)
Detroit Lions vs Philadelphia Eagles, Dec 30, 1995 (Wild Card Round)

- Most Kickoff Returns, Both Teams, Game, 15

Miami Dolphins (9) vs Buffalo Bills (6), Jan 12, 1991 (Divisional Round)

- Fewest Kickoff Returns, Both Teams, Game, 1

Green Bay Packers (0) vs Boston Redskins (1), Dec 13, 1936 (NFL Championship Game)
Kansas City Chiefs (1) vs San Diego Chargers (0), Jan 10, 1993 (Divisional Round)
Kansas City Chiefs (1) vs Houston Texans (0), Jan 9, 2016 (Wild Card Round)

- Most Yards, Kickoff Returns, Game, 244

San Diego Chargers vs San Francisco 49ers, Jan 29, 1995 (Super Bowl XXIX)

- Most Yards, Kickoff Returns, Both Teams, Game, 379

Oakland Raiders (186) vs Baltimore Colts (193), Dec 24, 1977 (Divisional Round)

- Fewest Yards, Kickoff Returns, Both Teams, Game, 5

Kansas City Chiefs (5) vs San Diego Chargers (0), Jan 10, 1993 (Divisional Round)

- Most Touchdowns, Kickoff Returns, Game, 1

by many teams; last: Kansas City Chiefs vs Houston Texans, Jan 9, 2016 (Wild Card Round)

- Most Touchdowns, Kickoff Returns, Both Teams, Game, 2

Baltimore Ravens (1) vs New York Giants (1), Jan 28, 2001 (Super Bowl XXXV)

== Turnovers ==
- Most Turnovers, Game, 9

Washington Redskins vs Chicago Bears, Dec 8, 1940 (NFL Championship Game)
Detroit Lions vs Cleveland Browns, Dec 26, 1954 (NFL Championship Game)
Houston Oilers vs Pittsburgh Steelers, Jan 7, 1979 (AFC Championship Game)
Buffalo Bills vs Dallas Cowboys, Jan 31, 1993 (Super Bowl XXVII)

- Most Turnovers, Both Teams, Game, 14

Houston Oilers (9) vs Pittsburgh Steelers (5), Jan 7, 1979 (AFC Championship Game)

=== Fumbles ===
- Most Fumbles, Game, 8

Buffalo Bills vs Dallas Cowboys, Jan 31, 1993 (Super Bowl XXVII)

- Most Fumbles, Both Teams, Game, 12

Dallas Cowboys (4) vs Buffalo Bills (8), Jan 31, 1993 (Super Bowl XXVII)

- Most Fumbles Lost, Game, 5

Buffalo Bills vs Dallas Cowboys, Jan 31, 1993 (Super Bowl XXVII)
Miami Dolphins vs Jacksonville Jaguars, Jan 15, 2000 (Divisional Round)

- Most Fumbles Recovered, Own and Opponents, Game, 8

Dallas Cowboys vs Denver Broncos, Jan 15, 1978 (4 own, 4 opponents, Super Bowl XII)

- Most Own Fumbles Recovered, Game, 5

Chicago Bears, 1934; Cleveland Browns, 1980
Chicago Bears vs New York Giants, Dec 8, 1934 (NFL Championship Game)
Cleveland Browns vs Oakland Raiders, Jan 4, 1981 (Divisional Round)

- Most Touchdowns, Fumbles Recovered, Own and Opponents, Game, 2

Dallas Cowboys vs Buffalo Bills, Jan 31, 1993 (Super Bowl XXVII)

=== Interceptions ===
- Most Passes Intercepted, Game, 8

Chicago Bears vs Washington Redskins, Dec 8, 1940 (NFL Championship Game)

- Most Passes Intercepted, Both Teams, Game, 10

Cleveland Browns (7) vs Los Angeles Rams (3), Dec 26, 1955 (NFL Championship Game)
Houston Oilers (4) vs San Diego Chargers (6), Dec 24, 1961 (AFL Championship Game)

- Most Yards Returning Interceptions, Game, 172

Tampa Bay Buccaneers vs Oakland Raiders, Jan 26, 2003 (Super Bowl XXXVII)

- Most Yards Returning Interceptions, Both Teams, Game, 184

Tampa Bay Buccaneers (172) vs Oakland Raiders (12), Jan 26, 2003 (Super Bowl XXXVII)

- Most Touchdowns, Returning Interceptions, Postseason, 4

Tampa Bay Buccaneers, 2002–03

- Most Touchdowns Returning Interceptions, Game, 3

Chicago Bears vs Washington Redskins, Dec 8, 1940 (NFL Championship Game)
St. Louis Rams vs Green Bay Packers, Jan 20, 2002 (Divisional Round)
Tampa Bay Buccaneers vs Oakland Raiders, Jan 26, 2003 (Super Bowl XXXVII)

- Most Touchdowns Returning Interceptions, Both Teams, Game, 3

Chicago Bears (3) vs Washington Redskins (0), Dec 8, 1940 (NFL Championship Game)
Green Bay Packers (0) vs St. Louis Rams (3), Jan 20, 2002 (Divisional Round)
Tampa Bay Buccaneers (3) vs Oakland Raiders (0), Jan 26, 2003 (Super Bowl XXXVII)

== Penalties ==
- Fewest Penalties, Game, 0

by many teams; last: New Orleans Saints vs San Francisco 49ers, Jan 14, 2012 (Divisional Round)

- Most Penalties, Game, 17

Los Angeles Raiders, 1993

- Fewest Penalties, Both Teams, Game, 1

Cincinnati Bengals (1) vs Los Angeles Raiders, Jan 13, 1991 (Divisional Round)

- Most Penalties, Both Teams, Game, 27

Los Angeles Raiders (17) vs. Denver Broncos (10), 1993

- Fewest Yards Penalized, Game, 0

by many teams; last: New Orleans Saints vs San Francisco 49ers, Jan 14, 2012 (Divisional Round)

- Most Yards Penalized, Game, 145

San Francisco 49ers vs New York Giants, Jan 3, 1982 (Divisional Round)

- Fewest Yards Penalized, Both Teams, Game, 5

Cincinnati Bengals (5) vs Los Angeles Raiders, Jan 13, 1991 (Divisional Round)

- Most Yards Penalized, Both Teams, Game, 228

Philadelphia Eagles (116) vs Dallas Cowboys, Jan 9, 2010 (Wild Card Round)

== Other ==
- Team with the lowest winning percentage to reach the playoffs, 7–9 (0.438)

Seattle Seahawks, 2010
Washington Football Team, 2020

- Team with the lowest winning percentage to win a playoff game, 7–9 (0.438)

Seattle Seahawks, 2010

- Team with the lowest regular season winning percentage to reach the NFC Championship Game, 8–7 (0.533)

Minnesota Vikings, 1987

- Team with the lowest regular season winning percentage to reach the AFC Championship Game, 9–7 (0.563)

Seattle Seahawks, 1983
Pittsburgh Steelers, 1984
Indianapolis Colts, 1995
Jacksonville Jaguars, 1996
New York Jets, 2009
Tennessee Titans, 2019

- Team with the lowest regular season winning percentage to reach the Super Bowl, 9–7 (0.563)

Los Angeles Rams, 1979
Arizona Cardinals, 2008
New York Giants, 2011

- Team with the lowest regular season winning percentage to win the Super Bowl, 9–7 (0.563)

New York Giants, 2011

- Longest playoff game, 82 minutes, 40 seconds

Miami Dolphins vs Kansas City Chiefs, Dec 25, 1971 (2OT, Divisional Round)

- Longest playoff drought, 25 seasons

Washington Redskins, 1946–1970
Chicago/St. Louis Cardinals, 1949–1973

- Longest playoff drought, expansion team, 20 seasons

New Orleans Saints, 1967–1986

- Longest playoff drought, active, 15 seasons

New York Jets, 2011–present

- Most consecutive seasons participating in playoffs, 11 seasons

New England Patriots, 2009–2019

- Longest drought without a playoff game won, 50 seasons

Chicago/St. Louis/Phoenix/Arizona Cardinals, 1948–1997

== See also ==
- NFL Individual Records
- NFL team Records
- Super Bowl Records
