= 1936 Pittsburgh Pirates (NFL) season =

NFL team season

1936 Pittsburgh Pirates season
- Owner: Art Rooney
- Head coach: Joe Bach
- Home stadium: Forbes Field

Results
- Record: 6–6
- Division place: 2nd NFL Eastern
- Playoffs: Did not qualify

The 1936 Pittsburgh Pirates season was the team's fourth season as a professional sports franchise and as a member of the National Football League (NFL). The team welcomed back head coach, Joe Bach who served his last year at the position (until returning in 1952). His team finished the season with the franchise's best record yet, at 6–6.

The Pirates played all of their home games at Forbes Field in Pittsburgh, Pennsylvania, except for one that was played at Point Stadium in Johnstown, Pennsylvania.

== Offseason ==
=== 1936 NFL draft ===
Pittsburgh Pirates 1936 NFL Draft selections
Draft order			Player name	Position	College	Notes
Round	Choice	Overall	Player name	Position	College	Notes
1	3	3	Bill Shakespeare	Halfback	Notre Dame	Did not play professional football
2	3	12	Len Barnum	Quarterback	West Virginia Wesleyan	Never played for Pirates
3	3	21	Bobby Grayson	Fullback	Stanford	Did not play professional football
4	3	30	Truman Spain	Tackle	Southern Methodist University	
5	3	39	Wayne Sandefur	Fullback	Purdue University	
6	3	48	Maurice Orr	Tackle	Southern Methodist University	
7	3	57	Marty Peters	Defensive end	Notre Dame	
8	3	66	Ed Karpowich	Tackle	Catholic University	
9	3	75	Joe Meglen	Back	Georgetown University	

== Regular season ==
=== Schedule ===
Game	Date	Opponent	Result	Record	Venue	Attendance	Recap	Sources
1	September 13	**Boston Redskins**	**W** 10–0	1–0	Forbes Field	15,622	Recap	
2	September 23	at **Brooklyn Dodgers**	**W** 10–6	2–0	Ebbets Field	10,000	Recap	
3	September 27	**New York Giants**	**W** 10–7	3–0	Forbes Field	25,800	Recap	
4	October 4	Chicago Bears	**L** 9–27	3–1	Forbes Field	29,000	Recap	
5	October 14	**Philadelphia Eagles**	**W** 17–0	4–1	Forbes Field	10,042	Recap	
6	October 18	at Chicago Bears	**L** 7–26	4–2	Wrigley Field	20,000	Recap	
7	October 25	at Green Bay Packers	**L** 10–38	4–3	Wisconsin State Fair Park	10,000	Recap	
8	November 1	**Brooklyn Dodgers**	**W** 10–7	5–3	Forbes Field	10,000	Recap	
9	November 5	at **Philadelphia Eagles**	**W** 6–0	6–3	Point Stadium	7,891	Recap	
10	November 8	at **Detroit Lions**	**L** 3–28	6–4	University of Detroit Stadium	20,000	Recap	
11	November 15	at Chicago Cardinals	**L** 6–14	6–5	Wrigley Field	3,856	Recap	
—	Bye							
12	November 29	at **Boston Redskins**	**L** 0–30	6–6	Fenway Park	7,000	Recap	
Note: Intra-division opponents are in **bold** text.

== Standings ==
NFL Eastern Division
	W	L	T	PCT	DIV	PF	PA	STK
Boston Redskins	7	5	0	.583	6–2	149	110	W3
Pittsburgh Pirates	6	6	0	.500	6–1	98	187	L3
New York Giants	5	6	1	.455	3–3–1	115	163	L1
Brooklyn Dodgers	3	8	1	.273	2–5–1	92	161	L1
Philadelphia Eagles	1	11	0	.083	1–7	51	206	L11

Note: Tie games were not officially counted in the standings until 1972.

== Game summaries ==
=== Game 1 (Sunday September 13, 1936): Boston Redskins ===
	1	2	3	4	Total
Redskins	0	0	0	0	0
Pirates	0	7	0	3	10

at Forbes Field, Pittsburgh, Pennsylvania

- Game time:
- Game weather:
- Game attendance: 15,622
- Referee:

Scoring Drives:

- Pittsburgh – Kakasic 26 fumble run (Niccolai kick)
- Pittsburgh – FG Kakasic 30

=== Game 2 (Wednesday September 23, 1936): Brooklyn Dodgers ===
	1	2	3	4	Total
Pirates	7	3	0	0	10
Dodgers	0	0	0	6	6

at Ebbets Field, Brooklyn, New York

- Game time:
- Game weather:
- Game attendance: 10,000
- Referee:

Scoring Drives:

- Pittsburgh – Strutt 3 run (Niccolai kick)
- Pittsburgh – FG Niccolai 26
- Brooklyn – Franklin 19 run (kick failed)

=== Game 3 (Sunday September 27, 1936): New York Giants ===
	1	2	3	4	Total
Giants	0	0	7	0	7
Pirates	0	7	0	3	10

at Forbes Field, Pittsburgh, Pennsylvania

- Game time:
- Game weather:
- Game attendance: 25,800
- Referee:

Scoring Drives:

- Pittsburgh – Sortet 11 pass from Matesic (Niccolai kick)
- New York – Richards 59 lateral from Burnett after pass from Danowski (Sarausky kick)
- Pittsburgh – FG Niccolai 11

=== Game 4 (Sunday October 4, 1936): Chicago Bears ===
	1	2	3	4	Total
Bears	7	7	13	0	27
Pirates	0	0	0	9	9

at Forbes Field, Pittsburgh, Pennsylvania

- Game time:
- Game weather:
- Game attendance: 29,000
- Referee:

Scoring Drives:

- Chicago – Karr 8 pass from Nagurski (Manders kick)
- Chicago – Brumbaugh 14 pass from Molesworth (Nagurski kick)
- Chicago – Karr 40 pass from Ronzani (kick failed)
- Chicago – Johnsos 36 pass from Molesworth (Stydahar kick)
- Pittsburgh – Heller 4 pass from Gildea (Kakasic kick)
- Pittsburgh – Safety, Feathers tackled in end zone by Brett

=== Game 5 (Wednesday October 14, 1936): Philadelphia Eagles ===
	1	2	3	4	Total
Eagles	0	0	0	0	0
Pirates	7	0	10	0	17

at Forbes Field, Pittsburgh, Pennsylvania

- Game time:
- Game weather:
- Game attendance: 10,042
- Referee:

Scoring Drives:

- Pittsburgh – Heller 16 pass from Matesic (Niccolai kick)
- Pittsburgh – Skoronski 19 pass from Matesic (Niccolai kick)
- Pittsburgh – FG Kakasic 36

=== Game 6 (Sunday October 18, 1936): Chicago Bears ===
	1	2	3	4	Total
Pirates	0	7	0	0	7
Bears	6	6	0	14	26

at Wrigley Field, Chicago, Illinois

- Game time:
- Game weather:
- Game attendance: 20,000
- Referee:

Scoring Drives:

- Chicago – Feathers 2 run (kick blocked)
- Chicago – Ronzani 38 pass from Brumbaugh (kick failed)
- Pittsburgh – Zaninelli 2 run (Niccolai kick)
- Chicago – Nagurski 1 run (Manders kick)
- Chicago – Feathers 8 run (Manders kick)

=== Game 7 (Sunday October 25, 1936): Green Bay Packers ===
	1	2	3	4	Total
Pirates	3	0	0	7	10
Packers	3	21	14	0	38

at Wisconsin State Fair Park, Milwaukee, Wisconsin

- Game time:
- Game weather:
- Game attendance: 10,000
- Referee:

Scoring Drives:

- Pittsburgh – FG Niccolai 30
- Green Bay – Laws 12 pass from Monnett (Engebretsen kick)
- Green Bay – Hutson 21 pass from Herber (Schwammel kick)
- Green Bay – P. Miller 2 run (Smith kick)
- Green Bay – Blood 28 interception (Hinkle kick)
- Green Bay – P. Miller 7 pass from Blood (Blood run)
- Green Bay – Hutson 11 pass from Herber (Schwammel kick)
- Pittsburgh – Karcis 1 run (Karcis run)

=== Game 8 (Sunday November 1, 1936): Brooklyn Dodgers ===
	1	2	3	4	Total
Dodgers	0	0	0	7	7
Pirates	3	0	7	0	10

at Forbes Field, Pittsburgh, Pennsylvania

- Game time:
- Game weather:
- Game attendance: 10,000
- Referee:

Scoring Drives:

- Pittsburgh – FG Niccolai 21
- Pittsburgh – Karcis 1 run (Niccolai kick)
- Brooklyn – Crayne 2 run (Kercheval kick)

=== Game 9 (Thursday November 5, 1936): Philadelphia Eagles ===
	1	2	3	4	Total
Pirates	0	0	0	6	6
Eagles	0	0	0	0	0

at Point Stadium, Johnstown, Pennsylvania

- Game time:
- Game weather:
- Game attendance: 7,891
- Referee:

Scoring Drives:

- Pittsburgh – FG Niccolai 41
- Pittsburgh – FG Niccolai 31

=== Game 10 (Sunday November 8, 1936): Detroit Lions ===
	1	2	3	4	Total
Pirates	3	0	0	0	3
Lions	0	21	0	7	28

at Titan Stadium, Detroit, Michigan

- Game time:
- Game weather:
- Game attendance: 20,000
- Referee:

Scoring Drives:

- Pittsburgh – FG Niccolai 25
- Detroit – Caddel run (Clark kick)
- Detroit – Ebding pass from Clark (Clark kick)
- Detroit – Gutowsky run (Clark kick)
- Detroit – Petersen 84 run (Presnell kick)

=== Game 11 (Sunday November 15, 1936): Chicago Cardinals ===
	1	2	3	4	Total
Pirates	0	6	0	0	6
Cardinals	7	7	0	0	14

at Wrigley Field, Chicago, Illinois

- Game time:
- Game weather:
- Game attendance: 3,856
- Referee:

Scoring Drives:

- Chicago – Grosvenor 9 run (Kellogg kick)
- Chicago – Smith 38 pass from Vaughan (Kellogg kick)
- Pittsburgh – Heller 48 pass from Matesic (kick failed)

=== Game 12 (Sunday November 29, 1936): Boston Redskins ===
	1	2	3	4	Total
Pirates	0	0	0	0	0
Redskins	7	10	0	13	30

at Fenway Park, Boston, Massachusetts

- Game time:
- Game weather:
- Game attendance: 7,000
- Referee:

Scoring Drives:

- Boston – Battles 2 run (Smith kick)
- Boston – FG Busich 14
- Boston – Carroll 35 interception (Busich kick)
- Boston – Tosi recovered fumble in end zone (Smith kick)
- Boston – Irwin 24 run (kick failed)

== Roster ==
1936 Pittsburgh Pirates final roster
Backs: 19 Max Fiske RB/CB/S; 33 Johnny Gildea RB/CB/S; 15 Warren Heller RB/CB; 64 Bull Karcis FB/LB; 47 Ed Matesic RB/CB; 27 Jim McDonald RB/CB; 10 Dick Sandefur FB/LB; 44 Art Strutt RB/CB; 22 Silvio Zaninelli RB/S; Ends/Receivers: 24 Jeep Brett; 25 Vincent Sites; 26 Ed Skoronski; 20 Bill Sortet	Linemen/Linebackers: 11 Maury Bray T/DT; 30 Win Croft G/DG; 14 George Kakasic G/DG/K; 36 Ed Karpowich T/DT; 29 Bill Lajousky G/DG; 40 Lindy Mayhew T/DT; 18 Lee Mulleneaux C/LB; 17 Armand Niccolai T/DT/K; 16 Buster Raborn C/LB; 53 George Rado G/DG; 28 Sandy Sandberg T/DT; Rookies in italics
