= 1936 Chicago Bears season =

NFL team season

- Head coach: George Halas
- Home stadium: Wrigley Field

Results
- Record: 9–3
- Division place: 2nd NFL Western
- Playoffs: Did not qualify

The 1936 season was the Chicago Bears' 17th in the National Football League and 14th season under head coach George Halas. The team was able to improve on their 6–4–2 record from 1935 and finished with a 9–3 record. The team also finished in second place in the Western Division behind the Green Bay Packers. After week 10, the Bears were tied with the Packers in first place with identical 9–1 records, having split their season series. However, the club swooned at the end of the year, losing their last two games on the road to Detroit and the Cardinals. Green Bay went on to easily defeat the Boston Redskins and win the NFL title.

== 1936 NFL draft ==
1936 Chicago Bears draft
Round	Pick	Player	Position	College	Notes
1	6	Joe Stydahar ^{†}	Offensive tackle	West Virginia	
2	14	Ed Michaels	Offensive guard	Villanova	
3	24	George Roscoe	Back	Minnesota	
4	32	Bob Allman	Offensive end	Michigan State	
5	42	Vern Oech	Offensive guard	Minnesota	
6	50	Ted Christofferson	Back	Washington State	
7	60	Dick Smith	Tackle	Minnesota	
8	68	John Sylvester	End	Rice	
9	78	Dan Fortmann ^{†}	Guard	Colgate	
Made roster † Pro Football Hall of Fame * Made at least one Pro Bowl during career

== Season highlights ==
The Bears featured a high-powered offense with a dynamic rushing scheme and a "vertical" passing attack. Bill Hewitt starred at end, catching 15 passes for 358 yards and 6 touchdowns (this fine performance was overshadowed by that of Don Hutson, who led the league in receiving). Bernie Masterson and Carl Brumbaugh shared quarterbacking duties, although coach Halas continued to feature passing, rushing, and receiving from all the backs in his still fairly primitive T-formation scheme. As a team, the Bears averaged 18.9 yards per pass completion for 17 touchdowns. Keith Molesworth continued as a triple-threat from the halfback position. Bronko Nagurski returned to form and led the team in rushing. Rookie linemen and future hall of famers Joe Stydahar and Danny Fortmann joined tackle George Musso on the line. Rookie Ray Nolting joined the strong backfield. Jack Manders had a fine season as a rusher and kicker, scoring 4 touchdowns while making 7 of 8 field goals and 17 of 21 PATs. He was second in the league in scoring, behind the Lions' all-purpose threat Dutch Clark. The Bear defense led the league in points allowed, giving up only 94 points and allowing more than 14 points only once, to the Packers.

== Future Hall of Fame players ==
- Dan Fortmann, guard (rookie from Colgate)
- Bill Hewitt, end
- George Musso, tackle
- Bronko Nagurski, fullback
- Joe Stydahar, tackle (rookie from West Virginia University)

== Other leading players ==
- Beattie Feathers, halfback
- Luke Johnsos, end
- Bill Karr, end
- Jack Manders, fullback/kicker
- Bernie Masterson, quarterback
- Keith Molesworth, halfback
- Ray Nolting, halfback (rookie from University of Cincinnati)
- Gene Ronzani, back

== Players departed from 1935 ==
- Art Buss (went to Philadelphia)
- Fred Crawford (quit after one season)
- Bob Dunlap (went to the New York Giants)
- Joe Kopcha, guard (went to Detroit)

== Schedule ==
Game	Date	Opponent	Result	Record	Venue	Attendance	Recap	Sources
1	September 20	at **Green Bay Packers**	**W** 30–3	1–0	City Stadium	14,312	Recap	
2	September 27	at Philadelphia Eagles	**W** 17–0	2–0	Municipal Stadium	25,000	Recap	
3	October 4	at Pittsburgh Pirates	**W** 27–9	3–0	Forbes Field	29,000	Recap	
4	October 11	**Chicago Cardinals**	**W** 7–3	4–0	Wrigley Field	16,288	Recap	
5	October 18	Pittsburgh Pirates	**W** 26–7	5–0	Wrigley Field	20,000	Recap	
6	October 25	**Detroit Lions**	**W** 12–10	6–0	Wrigley Field	27,424	Recap	
7	November 1	**Green Bay Packers**	**L** 10–21	6–1	Wrigley Field	31,346	Recap	
8	November 8	New York Giants	**W** 25–7	7–1	Polo Grounds	25,325	Recap	
9	November 15	at Boston Redskins	**W** 26–0	8–1	Fenway Park	12,000	Recap	
10	November 22	at Philadelphia Eagles	**W** 28–7	9–1	Municipal Stadium	10,000	Recap	
11	November 26	at **Detroit Lions**	**L** 7–13	9–2	Titan Stadium	22,000	Recap	
12	November 29	**Chicago Cardinals**	**L** 7–14	9–3	Wrigley Field	13,704	Recap	
Note: Intra-division opponents are in **bold** text. Thanksgiving: November 26.

== Standings ==
NFL Western Division
	W	L	T	PCT	DIV	PF	PA	STK
Green Bay Packers	10	1	1	.909	5–1–1	248	118	T1
Chicago Bears	9	3	0	.750	3–3	222	94	L2
Detroit Lions	8	4	0	.667	3–3	235	102	W1
Chicago Cardinals	3	8	1	.273	1–5–1	74	143	T1

Note: Tie games were not officially counted in the standings until 1972.
