= List of Princeton Tigers in the NFL draft =

This is a list of Princeton Tigers football players in the NFL draft.

== Key ==
B	Back	K	Kicker	NT	Nose tackle
C	Center	LB	Linebacker	FB	Fullback
DB	Defensive back	P	Punter	HB	Halfback
DE	Defensive end	QB	Quarterback	WR	Wide receiver
DT	Defensive tackle	RB	Running back	G	Guard
E	End	T	Offensive tackle	TE	Tight end

== Selections ==
Year	Round	Pick	Overall	Name	Team	Position
1936	7	1	55	Jac Weller	Philadelphia Eagles	G
1936	8	1	64	Pepper Constable	Philadelphia Eagles	B
1936	9	1	73	Paul Pauk	Philadelphia Eagles	B
1941	18	7	167	Dave Allerdice	New York Giants	B
1948	13	7	112	Tom Finical	Pittsburgh Steelers	E
1948	25	3	228	Dick West	Washington Redskins	B
1950	26	10	336	George Sella	Chicago Bears	B
1951	9	11	109	Hollie Donan	New York Giants	T
1952	15	5	174	Dick Pivirotto	Pittsburgh Steelers	B
1952	15	7	176	Dick Kazmaier	Chicago Bears	B
1953	13	2	147	Frank McPhee	Chicago Cardinals	E
1953	24	2	279	Brad Glass	Chicago Cardinals	G
1954	11	1	122	Homer Smith	Chicago Cardinals	B
1956	27	10	323	Royce Flippin	Washington Redskins	B
1957	29	12	349	Mike Bowman	New York Giants	G
1965	20	9	275	Cosmo Iacavazzi	Minnesota Vikings	B
1966	1	6	6	Charlie Gogolak	Washington Redskins	K
1966	6	15	95	Stas Maliszewski	Baltimore Colts	LB
1970	6	26	156	Robert Hews	Kansas City Chiefs	T
1970	15	12	376	Keith Mauney	Atlanta Falcons	DB
1972	12	13	299	Hank Bjorklund	New York Jets	RB
1973	11	21	281	Carl Barisich	Cleveland Browns	DT
1981	12	19	323	Cris Crissy	New England Patriots	DB
1982	11	12	291	Bob Holly	Washington Redskins	QB
1983	7	14	182	Jon Schultheis	Philadelphia Eagles	G
1990	12	23	327	Judd Garrett	Philadelphia Eagles	RB
2001	7	22	222	Dennis Norman	Seattle Seahawks	T
2013	7	1	207	Mike Catapano	Kansas City Chiefs	DE
2014	5	18	158	Caraun Reid	Detroit Lions	DT
2016	4	40	138	Seth DeValve	Cleveland Browns	WR
2023	6	29	206	Andrei Iosivas	Cincinnati Bengals	WR

== Notable undrafted players ==
Note: No drafts held before 1936

Debut year	Player name	Position	Debut NFL/AFL team
1989	Jason Garrett	QB	New Orleans Saints
2018	Chad Kanoff	QB	Arizona Cardinals
2019	John Lovett	FB	Kansas City Chiefs
2020	Kevin Davidson	QB	Cleveland Browns
