= Eddie Britt =

Eddie Britt may refer to:

- Eddie Britt (American football)
- Eddie Britt (politician)

== See also ==
- Edie Britt, a fictional character in the television series Desperate Housewives
