= Letlow =

Letlow is a surname. Notable people with the surname include:

- Julia Letlow (born 1981), American politician and academic administrator
- Luke Letlow (1979–2020), American politician
- Russ Letlow (1913–1987), American football player
