= Paul Miller (halfback) =

American football player (1913–1994)

Profile
- Position: Halfback

Personal information
- Born: January 23, 1913; Platte, South Dakota, U.S.
- Died: June 2, 1994 (aged 81); Tucson, Arizona, U.S.
- Listed height: 5 ft 11 in (1.80 m)
- Listed weight: 180 lb (82 kg)

Career information
- College: South Dakota State
- NFL draft: 1936: undrafted

Career history
- Green Bay Packers (1936–1938)

Awards and highlights
- NFL champion (1936)

Career NFL statistics
- Rushing yards: 537
- Rushing average: 3.8
- Touchdowns: 1

Paul William Miller (January 23, 1913 – June 2, 1994) was a halfback in the National Football League (NFL). He played with the Green Bay Packers for three seasons.

== College career ==
Miller attended South Dakota State, where he played football and track, lettering in football 1933-1935 and track 1934–1936. He was captain of his college team. In 1934, he was the nation's third highest point maker with 19 touchdowns during one season. In 1935, Miller played the most notable game of his college career when South Dakota State upset University of Wisconsin 13–6. The Jackrabbits clinched the game in the last two minutes when Miller intercepted a pass and dashed 75 yards for a touchdown.

== Professional career ==
Earl "Curly" Lambeau wrote Miller a letter pointing out how well the shifts and plays he learned at South Dakota State would fit into the Packer game. In Miller's rookie season, the Packers won their fourth World Championship. Miller played for the Packers from 1936 to 1938.
