= Ed Smith (running back) =

American football player (1913–1998)

No. 36, 28, 0
- Positions: Quarterback, Fullback, Defensive back

Personal information
- Born: June 17, 1913; New York, New York, U.S.
- Died: January 29, 1998 (aged 84)
- Listed height: 6 ft 2 in (1.88 m)
- Listed weight: 207 lb (94 kg)

Career information
- High school: George Washington (New York)
- College: NYU (1932-1935)
- NFL draft: 1936: 3rd round, 20th overall pick

Career history
- Boston Redskins (1936); Green Bay Packers (1937); Newark Tornadoes (1937)

Career NFL statistics
- Rushing yards: 39
- Rushing average: 5.6
- Passing yards: 120
- TD–INT: 1-3
- Stats at Pro Football Reference

Edward Smith (June 17, 1913 – January 29, 1998) was an American professional football running back in the National Football League (NFL) for the Boston Redskins and Green Bay Packers. He played college football at New York University and was selected in the third round of the 1936 NFL draft.

== College career ==
Smith was what sportswriters used to refer to as a triple-threat: he ran, passed and often quick-kicked in New York University's single-wing offense during the 1933–1935 seasons. Smith suffered a torn ligament in his left leg and a hemorrhage in his right leg, and NYU went 3–4–1 in 1934. The 1935 Thanksgiving game was the last of Smith's collegiate career.

During the 1935 football season, Smith posed for the Heisman Trophy study with the now-iconic straight or "stiff" arm. Sculptor Frank Eliscu asked Smith, his former high school classmate, to pose for a commissioned work involving a football player. They both attended George Washington High School in New York City's Washington Heights neighborhood.

The first Heisman Trophy presentation was on December 5, 1935. Smith did not realize that the sculpture, for which he posed, became the fabled Heisman Trophy until 1982. A documentary filmmaker tracked down Smith through his brother-in-law, Bob Pastor, a former heavyweight boxer who fought Joe Louis twice. The Downtown Athletic Club presented Smith with a Heisman Trophy of his own in 1985.

== Professional career ==
In February 1936, the Boston Redskins selected Smith, the #20 pick overall, in the third round of the NFL's first ever draft. Smith graduated from NYU in the spring of 1936 and proceeded to a career in professional football. The pay was $200 a game for the twelve-week season.

Smith played with the Redskins in the 1936 season. The Redskins played in the 1936 NFL Championship Game at New York's Polo Grounds on December 13, 1936. The Skins lost to the Green Bay Packers 21–6. Smith played with the Packers under coach Curly Lambeau in the 1937 season.

His ligament injury returned while playing in Green Bay and Smith left professional sports. He later played and coached semi-pro football in Springfield, Massachusetts in 1941. As player-coach, Smith again connected with Vince Lombardi, who played under Smith.

== NFL career statistics ==
Rushing and Passing Statistics
Year	Team	Games	Rushing Yards	Rushing Average	Passing Yards	TD–INT
1936	Boston Redskins	8	39	5.6	120	1–3
1937	Green Bay Packers	2	–	–	–	–
