= 1936 Boston Redskins season =

NFL team 5th Season

- Owner: George Preston Marshall
- General manager: Dennis J. Shea
- Head coach: Ray Flaherty
- Home stadium: Fenway Park

Results
- Record: 7–5
- Division place: 1st NFL Eastern
- Playoffs: Lost NFL Championship (vs. Packers) 6–21

The 1936 Boston Redskins season was the franchise's 5th season in the National Football League. The team finished with a record of seven wins and five losses and finished in first place in the Eastern Division of the National Football League. They won their final three games of the regular season to win the division title, the finale was a 14–0 shutout of the New York Giants at the Polo Grounds. The 1936 Boston Redskins finished with a record of 4–3 at home and 3–2 on the road.

The Redskins hosted the 1936 NFL Championship game against the favored Green Bay Packers, the Western Division champions with a 10–1–1 record and two regular season victories over Boston. The game was moved by owner George Preston Marshall from Fenway Park in Boston to the Polo Grounds in New York City to improve attendance. The Packers won the title game 21–6.

This was the first winning season for the Redskins, as well as their first championship game appearance. It was also the last season that the Redskins played in Boston; days after the title game, Marshall announced the move to his hometown of Washington, D.C. for the 1937 season.

== Schedule ==
Game	Date	Opponent	Result	Record	Venue	Attendance	Recap	Sources
1	September 13	at **Pittsburgh Pirates**	**L** 0–10	0–1	Forbes Field	15,622	Recap	
2	September 20	at **Philadelphia Eagles**	**W** 26–3	1–1	Municipal Stadium	20,000	Recap	
3	September 27	at **Brooklyn Dodgers**	**W** 14–3	2–1	Ebbets Field	15,000	Recap	
4	October 4	**New York Giants**	**L** 0–7	2–2	Fenway Park	15,000	Recap	
5	October 11	at Green Bay Packers	**L** 2–31	2–3	City Stadium	6,100	Recap	
6	October 18	**Philadelphia Eagles**	**W** 17–7	3–3	Fenway Park	4,000	Recap	
—	Bye							
7	November 1	Chicago Cardinals	**W** 13–10	4–3	Fenway Park	7,000	Recap	
8	November 8	Green Bay Packers	**L** 3–7	4–4	Fenway Park	11,220	Recap	
9	November 15	Chicago Bears	**L** 0–26	4–5	Fenway Park	12,000	Recap	
10	November 22	**Brooklyn Dodgers**	**W** 30–6	5–5	Fenway Park	5,000	Recap	
11	November 29	**Pittsburgh Pirates**	**W** 30–0	6–5	Fenway Park	7,000	Recap	
12	December 6	at **New York Giants**	**W** 14–0	7–5	Polo Grounds	18,000	Recap	
Note: Intra-division opponents are in **bold** text.

== Championship Playoff ==
Program for the 1936 NFL Championship Playoff, won by the Green Bay Packers. Although ostensibly a home game for the Redskins, the New York printer used Giants blue on the cover.

Because of dwindling fan support in Boston, Redskins owner George Preston Marshall moved his home game for the 1936 NFL championship to the Polo Grounds in New York City.

Round	Date	Opponent	Result	Venue	Attendance	Recap	Sources
Championship	December 13	Green Bay Packers	L 6–21	Polo Grounds	29,545	Recap	

== Roster ==
1936 Boston Redskins final roster
Backs: 20 Cliff Battles RB/CB; 12 Eddie Britt FB/LB; 23 Don Irwin FB/LB; 13 Ed Justice RB/CB; 11 Erny Pinckert RB/CB; 31 Pug Rentner RB/CB/S; 36 Ed Smith FB/LB; 35 Riley Smith RB/S/K; 25 Mark Temple RB/CB/S; 16 Heinie Weisenbaugh RB/CB/S	Linemen/Linebackers: 15 Jim Barber T/DT; 24 Frank Bausch C/LB; 26 Vic Carroll G/DG; 17 Turk Edwards T/DT; 18 Eddie Kahn G/DG; 29 Jim Karcher G/DG; 22 Gail O'Brien T/G/DT/DG; 21 Les Olsson G/DG; 27 Larry Siemering C/LB; 34 Steve Sinko T/DT	Ends/Receivers: 14 Sam Busich; 19 Charley Malone; 32 Bob McChesney; 40 Wayne Millner; 30 Flavio Tosi; Reserve: 23 Jim Moran G/DG; 25 Jim Musick FB/LB; -- Frank Walton G/DG (inactive); rookies in italics

== Standings ==
NFL Eastern Division
	W	L	T	PCT	DIV	PF	PA	STK
Boston Redskins	7	5	0	.583	6–2	149	110	W3
Pittsburgh Pirates	6	6	0	.500	6–1	98	187	L3
New York Giants	5	6	1	.455	3–3–1	115	163	L1
Brooklyn Dodgers	3	8	1	.273	2–5–1	92	161	L1
Philadelphia Eagles	1	11	0	.083	1–7	51	206	L11

Note: Tie games were not officially counted in the standings until 1972.
