= Bernie Scherer =

American football player (1913–2004)

- Bernie Scherer in his Nebraska Cornhuskers football uniform, 1934

No. 40, 11, 36, 24
- Position: End

Personal information
- Born: January 28, 1913; Spencer, Nebraska, U.S.
- Died: March 17, 2004 (aged 91); Sun City, Arizona, U.S.
- Listed height: 6 ft 1 in (1.85 m)
- Listed weight: 190 lb (86 kg)

Career information
- High school: Dallas (SD)
- College: Nebraska
- NFL draft: 1936: 3rd round, 25th overall pick

Career history
- Green Bay Packers (1936–1938); Pittsburgh Pirates (1939)

Awards and highlights
- NFL champion (1936); Third-team All-American (1935); 2× First-team All-Big Six (1934, 1935)

Career NFL statistics
- Receptions: 13
- Receiving yards: 242
- Receiving touchdowns: 3
- Stats at Pro Football Reference

Bernard Joseph Scherer (January 28, 1913 – March 17, 2004) was an American professional football end in the National Football League (NFL). He played for the Green Bay Packers from 1936 to 1938 and the Pittsburgh Pirates in 1939. He was selected in the third round of the 1936 NFL draft with the 25th overall pick. He was the first Nebraska Cornhuskers football player to be drafted in the NFL draft. He later served as an officer in the United States Army, reaching the rank of colonel and serving during World War II, the Korean War, and the Vietnam War. Scherer is buried at the National Memorial Cemetery of Arizona.

== Early life ==
Bernie Scherer was born in Spencer, Nebraska to Annie and Franz Scherer. His mother and father were both immigrants from Germany and came to America in 1873 through Ellis Island. Bernie was the youngest of 12 children and was younger than his oldest brother by 20 years.
