= Jimmy Lawrence (American football) =

American football player (1914–1990)

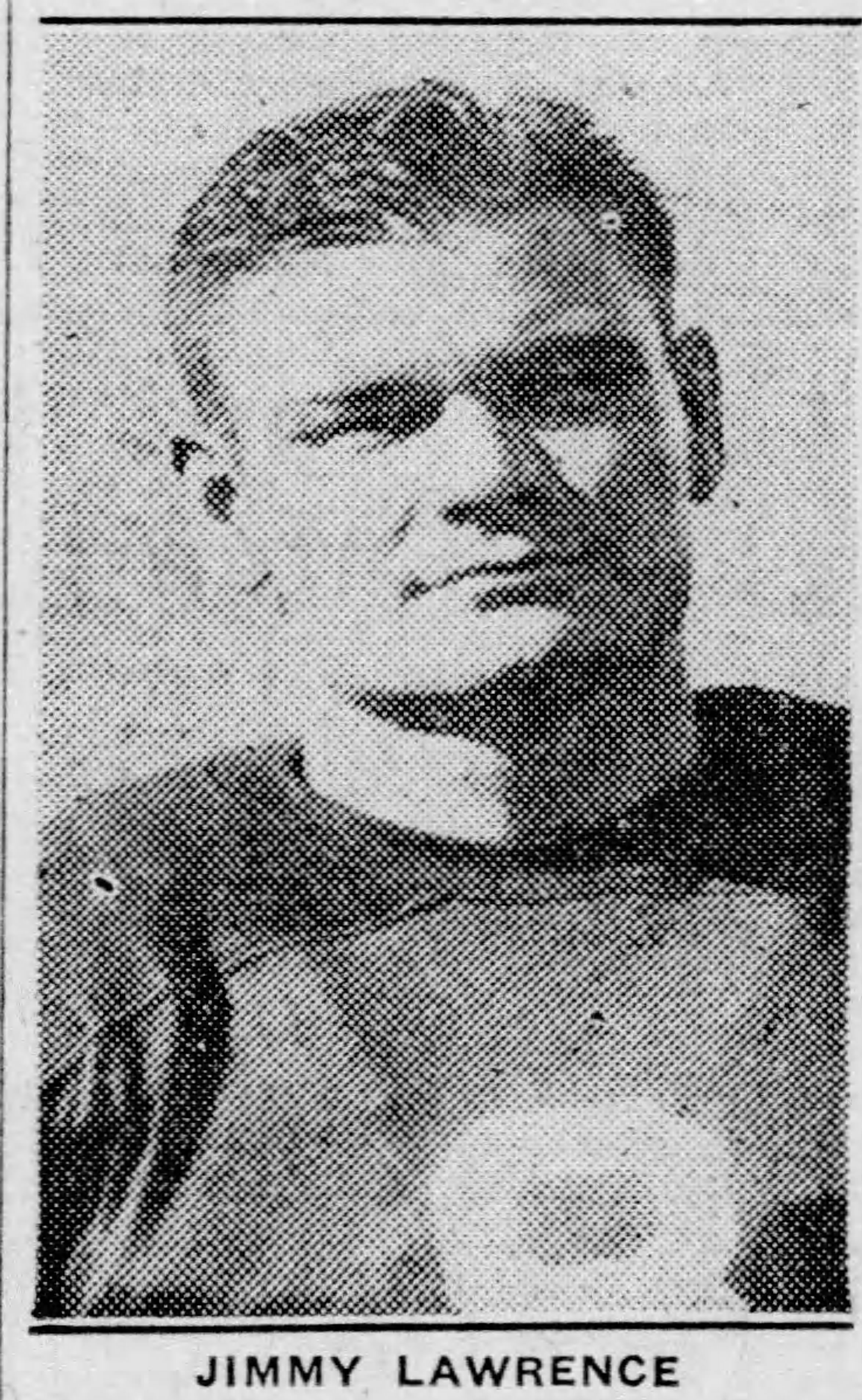
- Lawrence, 1935

No. 30, 8, 51
- Positions: Wingback, halfback

Personal information
- Born: March 15, 1914; Dawson, Texas, U.S.
- Died: May 17, 1990 (aged 76); Harlingen, Texas, U.S.
- Listed height: 5 ft 11 in (1.80 m)
- Listed weight: 190 lb (86 kg)

Career information
- High school: Harlingen
- College: TCU (1932–1935)
- NFL draft: 1936: 1st round, 5th overall pick

Career history
- Chicago Cardinals (1936–1939); Washington Redskins (1939)*; Green Bay Packers (1939)
- * Offseason or practice squad member only

Awards and highlights
- NFL champion (1939); Pro Bowl (1939)

Career NFL statistics
- Rushing yards: 357
- Rushing average: 2.7
- Receptions: 28
- Receiving yards: 274
- Total touchdowns: 4
- Stats at Pro Football Reference

James Boydston Lawrence (March 15, 1914 – May 17, 1990) was an American football and baseball player. He played college football for the TCU Horned Frogs from 1932 to 1935 and professional football in the National Football League (NFL) for the Chicago Cardinals from 1936 to 1939 and for the Green Bay Packers in 1939. He also played minor-league baseball from 1937 to 1941. He has been inducted into the TCU Athletics Hall of Fame, Rio Grande Valley Sports Hall of Fame, and the Texas High School Football Hall of Fame.

== Early life ==
Lawrence was born on March 15, 1914, in Dawson, Texas, United States. He attended Harlingen High School in Harlingen, Texas. He played quarterback for the Harlingen football team and was described as the "idol of Harlingen fans" and "just about everything" to his team. He was rated as "the greatest high school quarterback in the state" in 1930, "the best interscholastic product of 1931," and "the best prospect in many seasons." He led Harlingen to Rio Grande Valley titles in 1930 and 1931 and was later inducted into both the Rio Grande Valley Sports Hall of Fame and the Texas High School Football Hall of Fame.

== College ==
Lawrence attended Texas Christian University (TCU) and played at the halfback position for the TCU Horned Frogs football team from 1932 to 1935. He partnered with Sammy Baugh in the backfield and was described as "a human tank when carrying the leather" and "solid as a brick wall and with tremendous leg power."

Lawrence was co-captain of the 1935 TCU Horned Frogs football team, helping the team to a 12–1 record, including a victory over the Louisiana State University (LSU) football team in the 1936 Sugar Bowl. During the 1935 regular season, Lawrence played halfback on both offense and defense, winning a reputation as a "very fine tackler", while also gaining 474 rushing yards on 107 carries, completing nine of 15 passes for 144 yards, and tallying 22 receptions.

During his time at TCU, he was called "the heart of the Frogs' power attack." He led the team in rushing in 1933 and 1935 and in scoring in 1934 and 1935. He received All-Southwest Conference honors in 1933 and 1935.

== Professional football and baseball ==
Lawrence was the fifth player selected in the inaugural NFL draft, having been chosen by the Chicago Cardinals in the first round of the 1936 NFL draft. He played in the National Football League (NFL) for the Chicago Cardinals from 1936 to 1938. He had his best NFL season in 1938, tallying 207 rushing yards, 105 receiving yards, 65 passing yards, and three touchdowns.

After playing the first two games of the 1939 season with the Cardinals, Lawrence was traded to the Washington Redskins. The Redskins in turn sent him to the Green Bay Packers in early October. He appeared in five games for the NFL champion 1939 Packers, completing one pass for 25 yards and tallying one reception for 21 yards. He reported that he was paid about $150 per game.

During four years in the NFL, Lawrence appeared in 34 games, tallied 357 rushing yards on 130 carries, caught 31 passes for 313 yards, and scored four touchdowns. He also punted three times for an average of 38.3 yards.

Lawrence also played minor-league baseball between 1937 and 1941 for teams in Tiffin, Ohio; Lake Charles, Louisiana; Palestine, Texas; and Longview, Texas. During the 1937 season, he compiled a .338 batting average with 70 RBIs in 94 games for Lake Charles.

== Military service and later years ==
Lawrence served as a pilot in the United States Army Air Corps during World War II. In May 1942, an account of his death in an air mission during the Battle of Java appeared in newspapers across the country. The report was debunked the next day. He was reported to have been killed in action no fewer than three times.

Lawrence was inducted into the TCU Athletics Hall of Fame in 1985.

After the war, Lawrence returned to the Rio Grande Valley and was a leading football official. He died on May 17, 1990, at age 76 in Harlingen, Texas.

Lawrence's great-great nephew Clayton Tune was drafted by the Arizona Cardinals in 2023.
