= Bill Lajousky =

Lithuanian player of American football

No. 2
- Position: Guard

Personal information
- Born: April 18, 1913; Vilnius, Russian Empire
- Died: January 7, 1973 (aged 59); Waterville, Maine, U.S.
- Listed height: 5 ft 11 in (1.80 m)
- Listed weight: 200 lb (91 kg)

Career information
- High school: Classical (Worcester, Massachusetts, U.S.)
- College: Catholic
- NFL draft: 1936: undrafted

Career history
- Pittsburgh Pirates (1936); Washington Pros (1936); Pittsfield St. Mary's Golden Bears (1941); Holyoke Rosary Golden Bears (1942)
- Stats at Pro Football Reference

William Lajousky (April 18, 1913 – January 7, 1973) was a Lithuanian professional American football guard who played one season with the Pittsburgh Pirates of the National Football League (NFL). He played college football at the Catholic University of America.

== Early life ==
Lajousky was born in Vilnius, the son of William Lajousky and Mary Raulinaitis Zionkowsky. When his father was drafted into the military during the First World War, he and his mother lived on their own until his mother was also drafted as a munitions worker for the Germans. They were held at the Leopoldshall camp in Staßfurt, Germany. As a child, Lajousky suffered a shrapnel wound to his forehead before his internment, leaving a scar. Lajousky's father was never found after the war, and in 1921 Lajousky and his mother emigrated to Worcester, Massachusetts at the suggestion of his uncle, who had earlier emigrated to the United States.

Lajousky attended Worcester Classical High School in Worcester. He was a two-year letterman for the Catholic University Cardinals of the Catholic University of America from 1934 to 1935. He was a starter for the Catholic team that beat the Ole Miss Rebels in the 1936 Orange Bowl. He also participated in track and field at Catholic. Lajousky was inducted into the school's athletics hall of fame in 1979.

== Professional career ==
Lajousky signed with the Pittsburgh Pirates of the National Football League (NFL) after going undrafted in the 1936 NFL draft. He played in 11 games, starting five, for the Pirates during the 1936 season.

Lajousky also played in one game for the Washington Pros of the Dixie League in 1936.

He was a member of the independent Pittsfield St. Mary's Golden Bears during the 1941 season.

Lajousky played in 11 games, all starts, for the independent Holyoke Rosary Golden Bears in 1942.

== Personal life ==
Lajousky died on January 7, 1973, in Waterville, Maine.
