= Clarence Kellogg =

American football fullback

No. 24
- Position: Fullback

Personal information
- Born: September 8, 1911; Illinois, U.S.
- Died: September 3, 1988 (aged 76); Denver, Colorado, U.S.

Career information
- High school: Marseilles
- College: Saint Mary's (1932–1935)

Career history
- Chicago Cardinals (1936)
- Stats at Pro Football Reference

Clarence Henry Kellogg (September 8, 1911 – September 3, 1988) was an American professional football fullback. He played for the Chicago Cardinals of the National Football League (NFL).

== Life and career ==
Kellogg was born in Illinois. He played high school football at Marseilles High School in Marseilles, Illinois, and was captain of the football team in 1929. He then enrolled at Saint Mary's College of California to play college football for the Saint Mary's Gaels. He was on the freshman team in 1932, and was a three-year varsity letterman from 1933 to 1935.

In 1936, Kellogg joined the Chicago Cardinals of the National Football League (NFL). He started one game for the team, and played in twelve games during the 1936 NFL season. He became a free agent in August 1937.

== Death ==
Kellogg died on September 3, 1988, in Denver, Colorado, at the age of 76.
