= Bob Allman =

American football player (1914–1999)

No. 28, 27
- Position: End

Personal information
- Born: May 24, 1914; Alma, Michigan, U.S.
- Died: September 10, 1999 (aged 85); Los Osos, California, U.S.
- Listed height: 6 ft 0 in (1.83 m)
- Listed weight: 198 lb (90 kg)

Career information
- High school: Bay City Central (Bay City, Michigan)
- College: Michigan State
- NFL draft: 1936: 4th round, 32nd overall pick

Career history
- Chicago Bears (1936); Los Angeles Bulldogs (1936)
- Stats at Pro Football Reference

Robert Melvin Allmann (May 24, 1914 – September 10, 1999) was an American professional football player who was an end for one season with the Chicago Bears in the National Football League (NFL). He also played for the Los Angeles Bulldogs. Allman played college football for the Michigan State Spartans and was selected in the fourth round of the 1936 NFL draft. He died at his home in Los Osos, California, in September, 1999.
