= Vern Oech =

American football player (1913–1972)

- Oech in 1935

No. 23
- Position: Guard

Personal information
- Born: May 31, 1913; Beach, North Dakota, U.S.
- Died: December 13, 1972 (aged 59); Columbus, Ohio, U.S.
- Listed height: 6 ft 1 in (1.85 m)
- Listed weight: 207 lb (94 kg)

Career information
- High school: Winona Senior (Winona, Minnesota)
- College: Montana; Minnesota
- NFL draft: 1936: 5th round, 42nd overall pick

Career history
- Chicago Bears (1936–1937)

Awards and highlights
- 2× National champion (1934, 1935)

Career NFL statistics
- Games played: 8
- Stats at Pro Football Reference

Vernon Milton Oech (May 31, 1913 – December 13, 1972) was an American professional football player. He was selected by the Chicago Bears in the fifth round of the 1936 NFL draft. He played two seasons with the Bears of the National Football League (NFL). He was also a member of two collegiate national champion teams at the University of Minnesota.
