= 1936 Detroit Lions season =

NFL team season

- Owner: George A. Richards
- General manager: Potsy Clark
- Head coach: Potsy Clark
- Home stadium: University of Detroit Stadium

Results
- Record: 8–4
- Division place: 3rd NFL Western
- Playoffs: Did not qualify

The 1936 Detroit Lions season was the franchise's 7th season in the National Football League. The team failed to improve on their previous season's output of 7–3–2, losing four games. They failed to qualify for the playoffs.

== Schedule ==
| Game | Date | Opponent | Result | Record | Venue | Attendance | Recap | Sources |
|---|---|---|---|---|---|---|---|---|
| 1 | September 28 | **Chicago Cardinals** | **W** 39–0 | 1–0 | University of Detroit Stadium | 15,000 | Recap | |
| 2 | October 11 | at Philadelphia Eagles | **W** 23–0 | 2–0 | Philadelphia Municipal Stadium | 15,000 | Recap | |
| 3 | October 14 | at Brooklyn Dodgers | **W** 14–7 | 3–0 | Ebbets Field | 8,000 | Recap | |
| 4 | October 18 | at **Green Bay Packers** | **L** 18–20 | 3–1 | City Stadium | 13,500 | Recap | |
| 5 | October 25 | at **Chicago Bears** | **L** 10–12 | 3–2 | Wrigley Field | 27,424 | Recap | |
| 6 | November 1 | at New York Giants | **L** 7–14 | 3–3 | Polo Grounds | 26,243 | Recap | |
| 7 | November 8 | Pittsburgh Pirates | **W** 28–3 | 4–3 | University of Detroit Stadium | 20,000 | Recap | |
| 8 | November 15 | New York Giants | **W** 38–0 | 5–3 | University of Detroit Stadium | 20,000 | Recap | |
| 9 | November 22 | at **Chicago Cardinals** | **W** 14–7 | 6–3 | Wrigley Field | 7,579 | Recap | |
| 10 | November 26 | **Chicago Bears** | **W** 13–7 | 7–3 | University of Detroit Stadium | 22,000 | Recap | |
| 11 | November 29 | **Green Bay Packers** | **L** 17–26 | 7–4 | University of Detroit Stadium | 22,000 | Recap | |
| 12 | December 6 | Brooklyn Dodgers | **W** 14–6 | 8–4 | University of Detroit Stadium | 10,000 | Recap | |
Note: Intra-division opponents are in **bold** text.

== Roster ==
1936 Detroit Lions final roster
| Backs: 1 Ernie Caddel RB/CB; 2 Frank Christensen RB/CB; 7 Dutch Clark RB/CB/S/K; 5 Ace Gutowsky FB/LB; 8 Bill McKalip RB/CB; 4 Buddy Parker RB/CB; 6 Ike Petersen RB/CB/S; 3 Glenn Presnell RB/CB/S/K; 9 Bill Shepherd FB/LB | Linemen/Linebackers: 14 George Christensen T/DT; 20 Ox Emerson G/DG; 22 Tom Hupke G/DG; 16 Jack Johnson T/DT; 18 Joe Kopcha G/DG; 21 Sam Knox G/DG; 19 Regis Monahan G/DG; 17 Clare Randolph C/LB; 13 Del Ritchhart C/LB; 25 Red Stacy T/DT; 23 Jim Steen T/DT; 15 Sid Wagner G/DG | Ends/Receivers: 11 Harry Ebding; 10 Ed Klewicki; 27 Butch Morse; 12 John Schneller; rookies in italics |

== Standings ==
NFL Western Division
| | W | L | T | PCT | DIV | PF | PA | STK |
|---|---|---|---|---|---|---|---|---|
| Green Bay Packers | 10 | 1 | 1 | .909 | 5–1–1 | 248 | 118 | T1 |
| Chicago Bears | 9 | 3 | 0 | .750 | 3–3 | 222 | 94 | L2 |
| Detroit Lions | 8 | 4 | 0 | .667 | 3–3 | 235 | 102 | W1 |
| Chicago Cardinals | 3 | 8 | 1 | .273 | 1–5–1 | 74 | 143 | T1 |

Note: Tie games were not officially counted in the standings until 1972.

NFL Eastern Division
| | W | L | T | PCT | DIV | PF | PA | STK |
|---|---|---|---|---|---|---|---|---|
| Boston Redskins | 7 | 5 | 0 | .583 | 6–2 | 149 | 110 | W3 |
| Pittsburgh Pirates | 6 | 6 | 0 | .500 | 6–1 | 98 | 187 | L3 |
| New York Giants | 5 | 6 | 1 | .455 | 3–3–1 | 115 | 163 | L1 |
| Brooklyn Dodgers | 3 | 8 | 1 | .273 | 2–5–1 | 92 | 161 | L1 |
| Philadelphia Eagles | 1 | 11 | 0 | .083 | 1–7 | 51 | 206 | L11 |

Note: Tie games were not officially counted in the standings until 1972.
