= 1936 New York Giants season =

NFL team season

- Head coach: Steve Owen
- Home stadium: Polo Grounds

Results
- Record: 5–6–1
- Division place: 3rd NFL Eastern
- Playoffs: Did not qualify

The 1936 New York Giants season marked the franchise's 12th year in the National Football League (NFL).

== Offseason ==
=== NFL draft ===
1936 New York Giants draft
Round	Pick	Player	Position	College	Notes
1	9	Art Lewis	Tackle	Ohio	
2	18	Alphonse "Tuffy" Leemans * ^{†}	Fullback	George Washington	
3	27	Frank "Butch" Loebs	End	Purdue	
4	36	Gene Rose	End	Tennessee	
5	45	Edward A. Jontos	Guard	Syracuse	
6	54	Gus Durner	Tackle	Duke	
7	63	Bob Peeples	Tackle	Marquette	
8	72	Dale Heekin	Back	Ohio State	
9	81	Phil Flanagan	Guard	Holy Cross	
Made roster † Pro Football Hall of Fame * Made at least one Pro Bowl during career

== Schedule ==
Game	Date	Opponent	Result	Record	Venue	Attendance	Recap	Sources
1	September 13	at **Philadelphia Eagles**	**L** 7–10	0–1	Philadelphia Municipal Stadium	20,000	Recap	
—	Bye							
2	September 27	at **Pittsburgh Pirates**	**L** 7–10	0–2	Forbes Field	25,800	Recap	
3	October 4	at **Boston Redskins**	**W** 7–0	1–2	Fenway Park	15,000	Recap	
4	October 11	**Brooklyn Dodgers**	**T** 10–10	1–2–1	Polo Grounds	25,000	Recap	
5	October 18	Chicago Cardinals	**W** 14–6	2–2–1	Polo Grounds	17,000	Recap	
6	October 25	**Philadelphia Eagles**	**W** 21–17	3–2–1	Polo Grounds	15,000	Recap	
7	November 1	Detroit Lions	**W** 14–7	4–2–1	Polo Grounds	26,243	Recap	
8	November 8	Chicago Bears	**L** 7–25	4–3–1	Polo Grounds	25,325	Recap	
9	November 15	at Detroit Lions	**L** 0–38	4–4–1	University of Detroit Stadium	20,000	Recap	
10	November 22	Green Bay Packers	**L** 14–26	4–5–1	Polo Grounds	20,000	Recap	
11	November 26	at **Brooklyn Dodgers**	**W** 14–0	5–5–1	Ebbets Field	18,000	Recap	
12	December 6	**Boston Redskins**	**L** 0–14	5–6–1	Polo Grounds	18,000	Recap	
Note: Intra-division opponents are in **bold** text. Thanksgiving: November 26.

== Standings ==
NFL Eastern Division
	W	L	T	PCT	DIV	PF	PA	STK
Boston Redskins	7	5	0	.583	6–2	149	110	W3
Pittsburgh Pirates	6	6	0	.500	6–1	98	187	L3
New York Giants	5	6	1	.455	3–3–1	115	163	L1
Brooklyn Dodgers	3	8	1	.273	2–5–1	92	161	L1
Philadelphia Eagles	1	11	0	.083	1–7	51	206	L11

Note: Tie games were not officially counted in the standings until 1972.

== See also ==
- List of New York Giants seasons
