= 1936 NFL Championship Game =

American football championship game

Coordinates: 40.831°N 73.937°W

Green Bay Packers (Western) (10–1–1)	Boston Redskins (Eastern) (7–5)
21	6
Head coach: Curly Lambeau	Head coach: Ray Flaherty
	1	2	3	4	Total
GB	7	0	7	7	21
BOS	0	6	0	0	6
- Date: December 13, 1936
- Stadium: Polo Grounds; Manhattan, New York
- Referee: Wilmer G. Crowell
- Attendance: 29,545

The 1936 NFL Championship Game was the fourth championship game played in the National Football League (NFL). It took place on December 13 at Polo Grounds in New York City, making it the first NFL title game held on a neutral field.

The Eastern Division champion Boston Redskins (7–5) were the home team, but their owner George Preston Marshall, the Packers and the league mutually agreed to move the game from Fenway Park to the Polo Grounds due to low ticket sales in Boston.

Several days after the game, Marshall announced he would move the team to his hometown of Washington, D.C. for the following season.

This was the first championship game for both the Redskins and the Western Division champion Green Bay Packers (10–1–1), who were favored. The Packers won 21–6 for their fourth NFL title, all under longtime head coach Curly Lambeau, having previously won league championships awarded by league standing in 1929, 1930, and 1931.

61 years later, the Packers would then defeat the Boston team that replaced the Redskins, the New England Patriots, in Super Bowl XXXI.

== Background ==
The Green Bay Packers went 10–1–1 during the regular season to secure the Western Division title, while the Boston Redskins went 7–5 to win the Eastern Division.

== Game summary ==
=== Box score ===
Green Bay Packers vs. Boston Redskins – Game summary

Quarter	1	2	3	4	Total
Packers	7	0	7	7	21
Redskins	0	6	0	0	6

at Polo Grounds, Manhattan, New York

- Game time: 2:00 p.m. EST
- Game attendance: 29,545
- Referee: Wilmer G. Crowell
- Source: Pro-Football-Reference.com

Game information

First quarter

- GB – Don Hutson 48-yard pass from Arnie Herber. Packers 7–0.

Second quarter

- BOS – Pug Rentner 2-yard rush (missed kick). Packers 7–6.

Third quarter

- GB – Milt Gantenbein 8-yard pass from Arnie Herber. Packers 14–6.

Fourth quarter

- GB – Bob Monnett 2-yard rush (Paul Engebretsen kick). Packers 21–6.

Green Bay Packers stats

Passing

- Arnie Herber – 6/14, 129 yards, 2 touchdowns, 1 interception
- Bob Monnett 3/9, 24 yards, 1 interception

Rushing

- Clarke Hinkle – 16 rushes, 58 yards
- Bob Monnett – 10 rushes, -4 yards, 1 touchdown
- George Sauer – 4 rushes, 6 yards
- Johnny Blood – 2 rushes, 8 yards
- Hank Bruder – 2 rushes, 1 yard
- Swede Johnston – 1 rush, 2 yards
- Arnie Herber – 1 rush, 0 yards
- Paul Miller – 1 rush, -4 yards

Receiving

- Don Hutson – 5 receptions, 76 yards, 1 touchdown
- Johnny Blood – 2 receptions, 55 yards
- Milt Gantenbein – 2 receptions, 22 yards, 1 touchdown
Boston Redskins stats

Passing

- Riley Smith – 2/8, 19 yards
- Pug Rentner – 3/7, 31 yards
- Ed Smith – 1/5, 8 yards
- Don Irwin – 1/3, 33 yards
- Eddie Britt – 0/3, 0 yards

Rushing

- Don Irwin – 12 rushes, 39 yards
- Pug Rentner – 12 rushes, 5 yards, 1 touchdown
- Riley Smith – 3 rushes, -9 yards
- Cliff Battles – 2 rushes, 8 yards
- Eddie Britt – 2 rushes, 2 yards
- Ed Justice – 1 rush, -6 yards

Receiving

- Wayne Millner – 2 receptions, 26 yards
- Ed Justice – 1 receptions, 33 yards
- Charley Malone – 1 reception, 18 yards
- Eddie Britt – 1 reception, 8 yards
- Bob McChesney – 1 reception, 5 yards
- Don Irwin – 1 reception, 1 yard

== Starters ==
Players played both ways, offensively and defensively, in 1936. Thus, there were only these eleven starters for each squad.

Green Bay Packers

- LE - Milt Gantenbein
- LT - Ernie Smith
- LG/K - Paul "Tiny" Engebretsen
- C - George Svendsen
- RG - Lon Evans
- RT - Louis Gordon
- RE - Don Hutson ‡

- QB † - Hank Bruder
- LHB - George Sauer
- RHB - Arnie Herber ‡
- FB - Clarke Hinkle ‡

Boston Redskins

- LE - Wayne Millner ‡
- LT - Turk Edwards ‡
- LG - Les Olsson
- C - Frank Bausch
- RG - Jim Karcher
- RT - James Barber
- RE - Charley Malone

- QB - Riley Smith
- LHB - Ed "Chug" Justice
- RHB - Cliff Battles ‡
- FB - Don Irwin

† - Note: The quarterback in the single-wing offense was sometimes called the "blocking back", the ball was generally shotgun snapped to a halfback or the fullback.
‡ - Member of the Professional Football Hall of Fame.

== Officials ==
Flyer from the game

The NFL had only four game officials in 1936; the back judge was added in 1947, the line judge in 1965, and the side judge in 1978. The following were the four officials who called the 1936 championship game.

- Referee: Jordie Jordan
- Umpire: Bobby Cahn
- Head linesman: Maurice J. Meyer
- Field judge: William Halloran
