= David Smukler =

American football player (1914–1971)

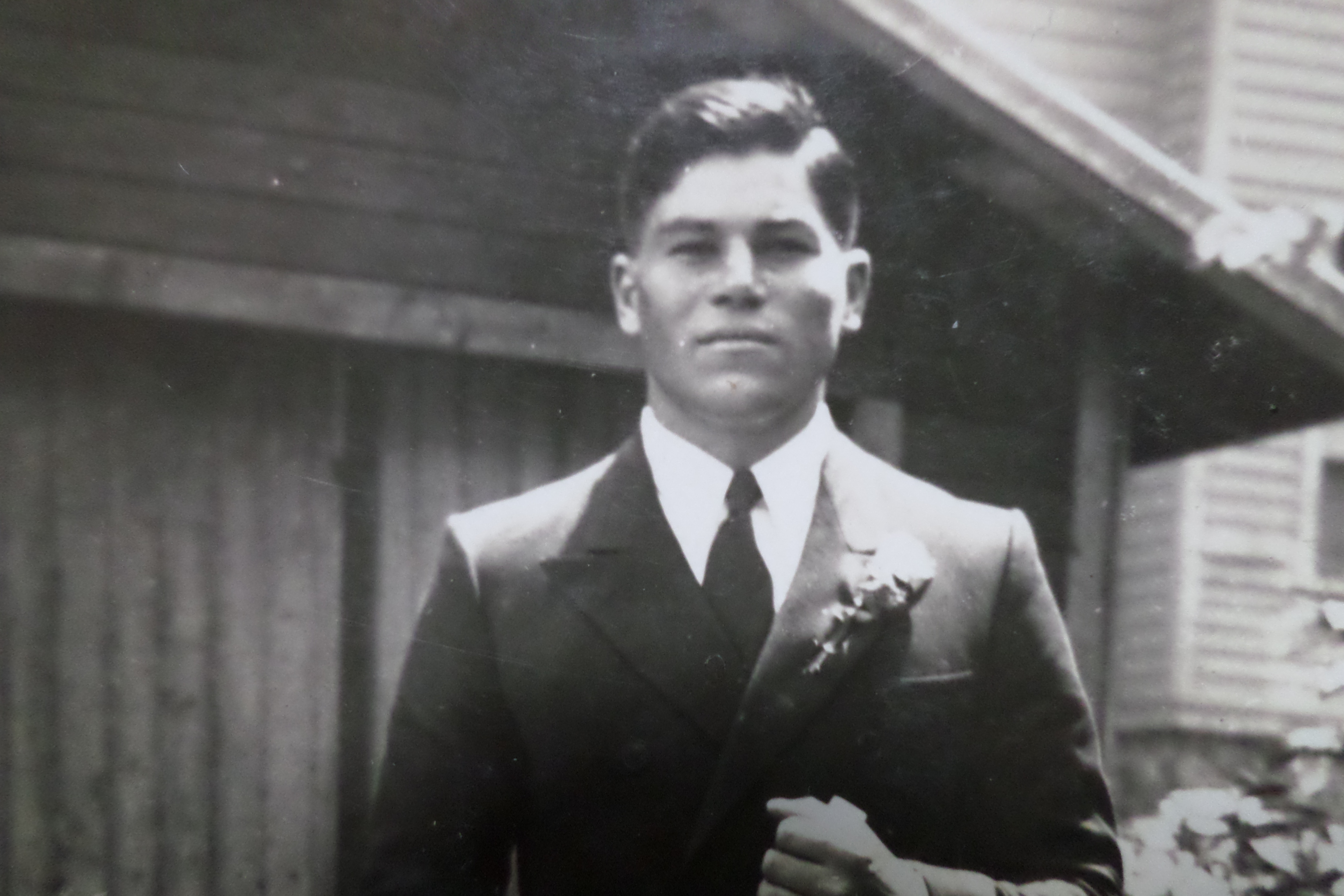

No. 13, 33
- Positions: Fullback, Linebacker

Personal information
- Born: May 31, 1914; Gloversville, New York, U.S.
- Died: February 22, 1971 (aged 56); Los Angeles, California, U.S.
- Listed height: 6 ft 1 in (1.85 m)
- Listed weight: 226 lb (103 kg)

Career information
- High school: East Side
- College: Temple; Missouri
- NFL draft: 1936: undrafted

Career history
- Philadelphia Eagles (1936–1939); Boston Yanks (1944)

Awards and highlights
- Third-team All-American (1934)

Career NFL statistics
- Passing attempts: 308
- Passing completions: 112
- Completion percentage: 36.4%
- TD–INT: 15–32
- Passing yards: 1,357
- Passer rating: 27.4
- Rushing yards: 1,106
- Rushing touchdowns: 2
- Stats at Pro Football Reference

David Smukler (May 31, 1914 – February 22, 1971), also known as "Dynamite Dave", was an American football player who played in 38 National Football League (NFL) games, mostly for the Philadelphia Eagles in the late 1930s. He was also the star player for the Temple University Owls in the inaugural Sugar Bowl game on January 1, 1935, in New Orleans, Louisiana.

== Early life ==
The youngest of seven children, Smukler was born on May 31, 1914, in Gloversville, New York, to Russian immigrants Morris Smukler and Eva Cohen. He was Jewish.

His family moved to Newark, New Jersey, in 1918, where he played tackle at East Side High School in 1929 and 1930, earning all-State honors the second year. Still in his teens, he returned to Gloversville to live with his oldest brother Lewis and became his apprentice, learning to shear gloves from skins. Playing football at Gloversville High School, Smukler was taken out of the line by Coach Lawrence A. (Duke) Miller and made into a fullback. He had never kicked a football for any team before, but he spent hours by himself punting the ball. Smukler kept his muscles strong by walking five miles uphill after every practice. When the football season began, he was considered a “one-man team” and lost only one game.

Besides excelling in football, Smukler was also a high-scoring guard on the basketball team and a member of the track team. In May 1932 he participated in the annual Rensselaer Polytechnic Institute interscholastic track meet in Troy, New York, and broke two state records, the 12-pound shot put and the discus throw.

== College career ==
Smukler enrolled in the University of Missouri in Columbia, Missouri, and played fullback under Frank Carideo. He left before the year ended and continued to learn glove cutting under his brother Lewis. In September 1933 Smukler transferred to Temple University in Philadelphia, Pennsylvania, and was chosen to play varsity fullback by Glenn “Pop” Warner one year later. After Smukler helped the Temple Owls achieve many wins, Warner stated, “He is a better fullback now than Ernie Nevers was in Nevers’s sophomore year. Dave is the best sophomore fullback I have ever seen. He may become the greatest fullback I have ever seen, a greater football player than Nevers or Jim Thorpe.” The coach also commended him as a defensive player, kicker, and forward passer, stating that “he combines fine judgment with his versatility. He is not the type that will get puffed up by praise, either.” Smukler played five consecutive games without ever letting the ball slip from his hand.

On January 1, 1935, he played against Tulane University in the inaugural Sugar Bowl game in New Orleans, Louisiana. When the teams were awaiting kickoff, Tulane's slogan was “Stop Smukler.” Smukler passed for one touchdown, kicked the extra point, and ran for a 25-yard touchdown. His efforts brought the Owls a 14–0 lead, but Tulane would ultimately beat Temple with a score of 20–14. Smukler was described after the game as “a wild bull, a mad elephant, a rip-roaring locomotive, a human-battering ram. He was 212 pounds of speed and power, who asked nothing more of his own line but that it get out of his way and let him run.”

Smukler temporarily withdrew from Temple in December 1935 due to a knee injury but returned at the start of the second semester. However, in March 1936 Smukler announced that he was leaving Temple again for a business position that was "too promising to refuse." He never graduated.

== Professional career ==
It was announced in August 1936 that Smukler had a contract with the Philadelphia Eagles. Apparently, the contract was signed two months before, but it was not announced earlier due to the uncertainty of Smukler's injury. He played with the Eagles for four seasons from 1936 to 1939. During his first year he had a career-high of 99 rushes for 321 yards.

Steve Owen, coach of the New York Giants, identified the Eagles as one of the teams he most feared “because they are dangerous any time Dave Smukler, the erstwhile Temple Terror, carries the ball.” Apparently, team owner Bert Bell once said that nobody could stop Smukler “when he was having a good day.” On October 2, 1938, the Eagles played the Chicago Bears at Philadelphia Municipal Stadium. The National Football League (NFL) program described Smukler as a “Powerhouse ball carrier and backer up on defense. Brilliant forward passer and terrific punter. Fifth best passer in the National Football League last year, completing 42 of 118 throws for a total gain of 432 yards. Carried ball from scrimmage 92 times to gain a total of 247 yards.”

After playing 34 games with the Eagles, Smukler was suspended in October 1939 for breaking training rules. When owner Bert Bell asked him why, Smukler allegedly told him, “I’m through with football.” Apparently, Smukler had broken training rules various times in the past. He had made a pledge to Bell that this would not happen again, only to break training once more. Bell said, “In my opinion, Dave was one of the greatest football players in professional football when he wanted to be. But I believe for the best interests of the team and myself we can do better without him as he was a demoralizing influence. He is a good boy but he just can’t keep his promises.”

In April 1940 he was traded to the Detroit Lions in exchange for two rookie players. However, Smukler decided to leave football and join the United States Army. He said, “I got $3,000 a year for playing football professionally. It was great during the season. Everybody shook your hand, slapped you on the back, and told you what a swell fellow you were. But the rest of the time, I couldn’t get a job.” Between football seasons Smukler could only make money doing piecework as a glove cutter. “It was enough to discourage any man, and I kept thinking about what I was going to do when I couldn’t play football anymore. I sat down and figured it out and then decided my best bet was the Army.”

Smukler was in active service for over three years. After serving as a first sergeant in Iceland, he received a medical discharge due to his old knee injury. He went back to work as a glove cutter in Gloversville and helped coach the football team at Gloversville High School. Smukler considered returning to football with the Detroit Lions, but he never appeared on their gridiron and was sold to the Boston Yanks in 1944. Smukler played only two games for the Yanks before ending his professional football career.

== Later life ==
In 1946, Smukler moved to California and was employed for three years as a station manager with the Standard Oil Company. He later worked in tire sales and held managerial posts with different companies. In 1947 it was reported that he joined the football coaching staff at Loyola University in Los Angeles as an end coach. Smukler later became West Coast commissioner for the Pop Warner Conference. He founded the Pop Warner Conference in Los Angeles and received the group's first Joe Tomlin All-American Award for “service beyond the call of duty.”

At time of his death, Smukler was general sales manager for Bridgestone Tire Co. of America, Inc. He was stricken with a heart attack at Los Angeles International Airport while preparing to board a plane for a sales meeting in Tulsa, Oklahoma. Smukler was 56 years old. He had suffered from heart trouble and undergone surgery seven years earlier for the installation of a pacemaker.

== Notes ==
There is disagreement among sources as to whether Smukler was born in Gloversville, New York, or Newark, New Jersey. The article “Smukler’s Parents Wed 55 Years Ago” states that his parents moved from Gloversville to Newark in 1918, four years after his birth. This would suggest that he was born in Gloversville, NY. An article where he displays his birth certificate indicates he was born in Gloversville. The California Death Index states that he was born in the State of New York.

One article said that his father was also named David Smukler, but other sources (including his father's obituary) give his name as Morris Smukler.

Most sources agree that he died on February 22, 1971, at the age of 56.
