= Ross Carter =

American football player (1914–2002)

No. 28
- Positions: Guard, center

Personal information
- Born: March 10, 1914; Republic, Missouri, U.S.
- Died: June 19, 2002 (aged 88); Eugene, Oregon, U.S.
- Listed height: 6 ft 0 in (1.83 m)
- Listed weight: 238 lb (108 kg)

Career information
- High school: Lakeview (Lakeview, Oregon)
- College: Oregon
- NFL draft: 1936: 8th round, 69th overall pick

Career history
- Chicago Cardinals (1936–1939)

Awards and highlights
- Collyers Eye Mag.: 2nd team all-pro (1938)

Career NFL statistics
- Games played: 42
- Games started: 30
- Stats at Pro Football Reference

Roscoe Challis Carter (March 10, 1914 – June 19, 2002) was an American professional football player professionally as a guard and center in the National Football League (NFL) with the Chicago Cardinals from 1936 to 1939. He played college football at the University of Oregon. He was selected in the eighth round of the 1936 NFL draft with the 69th overall pick.
