= Rudy Gollomb =

American football player (1911–1991)

No. 14
- Position: Guard

Personal information
- Born: November 6, 1911; Oshkosh, Wisconsin, U.S.
- Died: September 11, 1991 (aged 79); Oshkosh, Wisconsin, U.S.
- Listed height: 5 ft 11 in (1.80 m)
- Listed weight: 205 lb (93 kg)

Career information
- College: Wisconsin; Carroll (WI)

Career history
- Philadelphia Eagles (1936)

Career statistics
- Games played: 4
- Stats at Pro Football Reference

Rudolph Peter Gollomb (November 6, 1911 – September 11, 1991) was a player in the National Football League for the Philadelphia Eagles in 1936 as a guard. He played at the collegiate level at Carroll University and the University of Wisconsin–Madison.

== Biography ==
Gollomb was born Rudolph Peter Gollomb on November 6, 1911, in Oshkosh, Wisconsin. He died September 11, 1991.

== See also ==
- List of Philadelphia Eagles players
