= Russ Letlow =

American football player (1913–1987)

No. 46
- Position: Guard

Personal information
- Born: October 5, 1913; Dinuba, California, U.S.
- Died: October 12, 1987 (aged 74); San Luis Obispo, California, U.S.
- Listed height: 6 ft 0 in (1.83 m)
- Listed weight: 214 lb (97 kg)

Career information
- High school: Taft (CA) Union
- College: San Francisco (1932-1935)
- NFL draft: 1936: 1st round, 7th overall pick

Career history
- Green Bay Packers (1936–1942, 1946)

Awards and highlights
- 2× NFL champion (1936, 1939); 2× Pro Bowl (1938, 1939); NFL 1930s All-Decade Team; Green Bay Packers Hall of Fame (1972)

Career NFL statistics
- Games played: 71
- Stats at Pro Football Reference

Willard Russell Letlow (October 5, 1913 – October 12, 1987) was an American professional football guard who played professionally for the Green Bay Packers of the National Football League (NFL).

Letlow played his college career at the University of San Francisco. Prior to the 1936 NFL draft, college players were free agents that could sign with an NFL team; Letlow had signed with the Chicago Cardinals prior to the draft. Subsequently, he was chosen by the Green Bay Packers as their first-round draft pick in the inaugural 1936 NFL draft. After being drafted by Green Bay, he was released by the Cardinals.

In Letlow's rookie season, the Packers won their fourth NFL Championship (and first championship game). Letlow played for the Packers from 1936 to 42, and again in 1946. He was selected as an All-Pro for four straight seasons from 1937 to 1940. He played in 71 career games while starting in 30 of them. He was named to the All-Star game, the predecessor to the Pro Bowl in 1938 and 1939. He went into the Navy in 1943, being named to the All-Service team in 1943 and 1944. He returned to the Packers for one more season in 1946.

Letlow was inducted into the Green Bay Packers Hall of Fame in 1972. Letlow is one of ten players that were named to the National Football League 1930s All-Decade Team that have not been inducted into the Pro Football Hall of Fame.
