= 1936 Brooklyn Dodgers (NFL) season =

National Football League team season

1936 Brooklyn Dodgers season
- Owner: Dan Topping
- Head coach: Paul Schissler
- Home stadium: Ebbets Field

Results
- Record: 3–8–1
- Division place: 4th NFL East
- Playoffs: Did not qualify

The 1936 Brooklyn Dodgers season marked the team's seventh year in the National Football League (NFL). The team failed to improve on their previous season's output of 5–6–1, winning only three games. They failed to qualify for the playoffs for the fifth consecutive season.

== Preseason ==
=== NFL draft ===
1936 Brooklyn Dodgers draft
Round	Pick	Player	Position	College	Notes
1	4	Dick Crayne	FB	Iowa	
2	13	Vernal "Babe" LeVoir	B	Minnesota	
3	22	Wagner Jorgensen	Center	St. Mary's (CA)	
4	31	Bear Bryant	E	Alabama	
5	40	Bob Wilson	TB	SMU	
6	49	Joe Maniaci *	Back	Fordham	
7	58	Herb Schreiber	Back	St. Mary's (CA)	
8	67	Bob "Bones" Hamilton	Back	Stanford	
9	76	Jim "Monk" Moscrip	End	Stanford	
Made roster * Made at least one Pro Bowl during career

== Schedule ==
Game	Date	Opponent	Result	Record	Venue	Attendance	Recap	Sources
1	September 23	**Pittsburgh Pirates**	**L** 6–10	0–1	Ebbets Field	10,000	Recap	
2	September 27	**Boston Redskins**	**L** 3–14	0–2	Ebbets Field	15,000	Recap	
3	October 4	**Philadelphia Eagles**	**W** 18–0	1–2	Ebbets Field	10,000	Recap	
4	October 11	at **New York Giants**	**T** 10–10	1–2–1	Polo Grounds	25,000	Recap	
5	October 14	Detroit Lions	**L** 7–14	1–3–1	Ebbets Field	8,000	Recap	
—	Bye							
6	October 25	Chicago Cardinals	**W** 9–0	2–3–1	Ebbets Field	20,000	Recap	
7	November 1	at **Pittsburgh Pirates**	**L** 7–10	2–4–1	Forbes Field	10,000	Recap	
—	Bye							
8	November 15	Green Bay Packers	**L** 7–38	2–5–1	Ebbets Field	25,325	Recap	
9	November 22	at **Boston Redskins**	**L** 6–30	2–6–1	Fenway Park	5,000	Recap	
10	November 26	at **New York Giants**	**L** 0–14	2–7–1	Polo Grounds	18,000	Recap	
11	November 29	at **Philadelphia Eagles**	**W** 13–7	3–7–1	Philadelphia Municipal Stadium	5,000	Recap	
12	December 6	at Detroit Lions	**L** 6–14	3–8–1	University of Detroit Stadium	10,000	Recap	
Note: Intra-division opponents are in **bold** text.

== Standings ==
NFL Eastern Division
	W	L	T	PCT	DIV	PF	PA	STK
Boston Redskins	7	5	0	.583	6–2	149	110	W3
Pittsburgh Pirates	6	6	0	.500	6–1	98	187	L3
New York Giants	5	6	1	.455	3–3–1	115	163	L1
Brooklyn Dodgers	3	8	1	.273	2–5–1	92	161	L1
Philadelphia Eagles	1	11	0	.083	1–7	51	206	L11

Note: Tie games were not officially counted in the standings until 1972.

== Roster ==
1936 Brooklyn Dodgers final roster
Backs: 15 Dick Crayne FB/LB; 31 Red Franklin RB/CB; 29 Tony Kaska FB/LB; 26 Ralph Kercheval RB/CB/K; 27 Father Lumpkin RB/S; 34 Joe Maniaci RB/S; 25 Phil Sarboe RB/CB/S; 10 Bob Wilson RB/CB; Ends/Receivers: 32 Red Badgro; 33 Jeff Barrett; 23 Ray Fuqua; 11 Paul Riblett	Linemen/Linebackers: 28 Verdi Boyer G/DG; 14 Carl Heldt T/DT; 18 Wagner Jorgensen C/LB; 20 Bo Kirkland G/DG; 24 Henry Krause C/LB; 21 Bill Lee T/DT; 35 Justin Rukas G/DG; 19 Frank Stojack G/DG; 30 Jim Whatley T/DT; 12 John Yezerski T/DT; Rookies in italics
