= Edward A. Jontos =

American athlete and coach (1910–1996)

Biographical details
- Born: June 14, 1910; Connecticut, U.S.
- Died: November 26, 1996 (aged 86); Troy, New York, U.S.

Playing career

Football
- 1933–1935: Syracuse

Basketball
- 1933–1934: Syracuse
- Positions: Guard (football); Forward (basketball)

Coaching career (HC unless noted)

Football
- 1936: Syracuse (assistant)
- 1937–1941: St. Bonaventure (assistant)
- 1945: Camp Peary
- 1946–1952: RPI

Basketball
- 1937–1942: St. Bonaventure (assistant)

Lacrosse
- 1937: Syracuse (assistant)
- 1961–1959: RPI

Head coaching record
- Overall: 24–38–2 (football); 52–50 (lacrosse)

Edward A. Jontos (June 14, 1910 – November 26, 1996) was an American football, basketball, and lacrosse player and coach. He was a three-sport athlete at Syracuse University in the early 1930s. and was selected by the New York Giants in the 1936 NFL draft. Jontos served as the head football coach at Rensselaer Polytechnic Institute (RPI) in Troy, New York from 1946 to 1952, compiling a record of 19–35–2.
