= Del Ritchhart =

American football player (1910–1981)

Profile
- Positions: Center, linebacker

Personal information
- Born: November 2, 1910; Minot, North Dakota, U.S.
- Died: February 18, 1981 (aged 70)
- Listed height: 6 ft 0 in (1.83 m)
- Listed weight: 195 lb (88 kg)

Career information
- High school: La Junta (CO)
- College: Colorado

Career history
- Detroit Lions (1936–1937)

Career statistics
- Games: 2
- Stats at Pro Football Reference

Delbert Bush Ritchhart (November 2, 1910 – February 18, 1981) was an American football player.

Ritchhart was born in 1910 in Carthage, Missouri. He attended La Junta High School in Colorado and then played college football as a guard and end at the University of Colorado from 1933 to 1935. He was selected as an all-Rocky Mountain Conference end. He also played as a third baseman for the Colorado baseball team.

In March 1936, Ritchhart signed a contract to play professional football in the National Football League (NFL) for the Detroit Lions. He appeared in 21 NFL games, 11 as a starter, during the 1936 and 1937 seasons. He was a two-way player for the Lions, playing linebacker on defense and center on offense.

In August 1938, Ritchart accepted a position as a coach and teacher at a high school in Fruita, Colorado.
