= Versil Deskin =

American football player (1913–1992)

Profile
- Position: Wide receiver

Personal information
- Born: February 14, 1913; Avery, Iowa, U.S.
- Died: March 7, 1992 (aged 79)

Career information
- College: Drake University

Career history
- 1935–1939: Chicago Cardinals

Versil Eugene Deskin (February 14, 1913 – March 7, 1992) was an American professional football player who played wide receiver for five seasons for the Chicago Cardinals.

== Education ==
While studying at Drake University, Deskin played in both the American football and basketball teams.
