= Jeep Brett =

American football player (1914–1989)

No. 34, 24
- Position: End

Personal information
- Born: March 20, 1914; Lewiston, Idaho, U.S.
- Died: May 17, 1989 (aged 75); Seattle, Washington, U.S.
- Listed height: 6 ft 2 in (1.88 m)
- Listed weight: 205 lb (93 kg)

Career information
- High school: Lewiston
- College: Washington State
- NFL draft: 1936: 4th round, 33rd overall pick

Career history
- Chicago Cardinals (1936); Pittsburgh Pirates (1936–1937); Green Bay Packers (1938)*
- * Offseason or practice squad member only

Career NFL statistics
- Receiving yards: 274
- Average: 18.3
- Touchdowns: 1
- Stats at Pro Football Reference

Edwin Darragh "Jeep" Brett (March 20, 1914 – May 17, 1989) was an American professional football player. He was selected 33rd overall in the fourth round of the 1936 NFL draft. He played two years in the National Football League (NFL).
