= 1936 Green Bay Packers season =

NFL team season

- Head coach: Curly Lambeau
- Home stadium: City Stadium, Wisconsin State Fair Park

Results
- Record: 10–1–1
- Division place: 1st NFL Western
- Playoffs: Won NFL Championship (at Redskins) 21–6

The 1936 Green Bay Packers season was the franchise 's 18th season overall, 16th season in the National Football League, and the 18th under head coach Curly Lambeau. The team improved on their 8–4 record from 1935 and finished with a 10–1–1 record, first in the NFL's Western Division.

The Packers met the Eastern Division champion Boston Redskins (7–5) in the NFL Championship Game, held at the Polo Grounds in New York City. The favored Packers had won the two regular season meetings with Boston and won 21–6 for their fourth NFL Championship, first earned by playoff victory, and first since the three-championship streak of 1929–1931.

The Packers' 1936 schedule began with six consecutive home games, with the remainder of the season on the road.

== Offseason ==
=== NFL draft ===
1936 Green Bay Packers draft
Round	Pick	Player	Position	College	Notes
1	7	Russ Letlow *	G	San Francisco	
2	16	J. W. Wheeler	T	Oklahoma	
3	25	Bernie Scherer	End	Nebraska	
4	34	Theron Ward	Back	Idaho	
5	43	Darrell Lester	Center	TCU	Began career with Packers in 1937
6	52	Bob Reynolds	T	Stanford	
7	61	Wally Fromhart	Back	Notre Dame	
8	70	Wally Cruice	Back	Northwestern	
9	79	J. C. Wetsel	G	SMU	
Made roster * Made at least one Pro Bowl during career

== Regular season ==
=== Schedule ===
Game	Date	Opponent	Result	Record	Venue	Attendance	Recap	Sources
1	September 13	Chicago Cardinals	**W** 10–7	1–0	City Stadium	8,900	Recap	
2	September 20	**Chicago Bears**	**L** 3–30	1–1	City Stadium	14,312	Recap	
—	Bye							
3	October 4	**Chicago Cardinals**	**W** 24–0	2–1	Wisconsin State Fair Park	11,000	Recap	
4	October 11	Boston Redskins	**W** 31–2	3–1	City Stadium	6,100	Recap	
5	October 18	**Detroit Lions**	**W** 20–18	4–1	City Stadium	13,500	Recap	
6	October 25	Pittsburgh Pirates	**W** 38–10	5–1	Wisconsin State Fair Park	10,000	Recap	
7	November 1	at **Chicago Bears**	**W** 21–10	6–1	Wrigley Field	31,346	Recap	
8	November 8	at Boston Redskins	**W** 7–3	7–1	Fenway Park	11,220	Recap	
9	November 15	at Brooklyn Dodgers	**W** 38–7	8–1	Ebbets Field	25,325	Recap	
10	November 22	at New York Giants	**W** 26–14	9–1	Polo Grounds	20,000	Recap	
11	November 28	at **Detroit Lions**	**W** 26–17	10–1	University of Detroit Stadium	22,000	Recap	
12	December 6	at **Chicago Cardinals**	**T** 0–0	10–1–1	Wrigley Field	4,793	Recap	
Note: Intra-division opponents are in **bold** text.

== Playoffs ==
Round	Date	Opponent	Result	Venue	Recap	Sources
Championship	December 13	at Boston Redskins	W 21–6	Polo Grounds	Recap	

- The game was moved by Boston ownership and played at the Polo Grounds in New York City.

== Standings ==
NFL Western Division
	W	L	T	PCT	DIV	PF	PA	STK
Green Bay Packers	10	1	1	.909	5–1–1	248	118	T1
Chicago Bears	9	3	0	.750	3–3	222	94	L2
Detroit Lions	8	4	0	.667	3–3	235	102	W1
Chicago Cardinals	3	8	1	.273	1–5–1	74	143	T1

Note: Tie games were not officially counted in the standings until 1972.

== Awards and records ==
- Arnie Herber, NFL Leader, passing yards (1,239)
