= Wayne Millner =

American football player and coach (1913–1976)

No. 40
- Position: End

Personal information
- Born: January 31, 1913; Roxbury, Massachusetts, U.S.
- Died: November 19, 1976 (aged 63); Arlington, Virginia, U.S.
- Listed height: 6 ft 1 in (1.85 m)
- Listed weight: 189 lb (86 kg)

Career information
- High school: Salem (MA); Malvern (Malvern, Pennsylvania)
- College: Notre Dame (1932-1935)
- NFL draft: 1936: 8th round, 65th overall pick

Career history

Playing
- Boston / Washington Redskins (1936–1941, 1945)

Coaching
- Washington Redskins (1946–1948) Ends coach; Chicago Hornets (1949) Defensive backs coach; Baltimore Colts (1950) Defensive backs coach; Philadelphia Eagles (1951) Interim head coach; Washington Redskins (1952–1956) Defensive backs coach; Hardin–Simmons (1957) Defensive backs coach; Florida Blazers (1974) Defensive backs coach

Awards and highlights
- NFL champion (1937); NFL 1930s All-Decade Team; 80 Greatest Redskins; Washington Commanders Ring of Fame; Consensus All-American (1935)

Career NFL statistics
- Receptions: 124
- Receiving yards: 1,578
- Receiving touchdowns: 12
- Stats at Pro Football Reference
- Coaching profile at Pro Football Reference
- Pro Football Hall of Fame
- College Football Hall of Fame

Wayne Vernal Millner (January 31, 1913 – November 19, 1976) was an American professional football player who was an offensive and defensive end for the Boston / Washington Redskins of the National Football League (NFL). He played college football for the Notre Dame Fighting Irish.

== Early life ==
Millner grew up in Roxbury, Massachusetts, and was Jewish. He played high school football at Salem High School, where he earned All-State honors in football during each of his four seasons of play.

Millner later played for three prep schools, including Malvern Preparatory School, until Notre Dame recruited him in 1933.

== College career ==
Millner attended and played college football at the University of Notre Dame from 1933 through 1935.

While at Notre Dame, Millner was involved in many notable plays. In 1933, Notre Dame was playing unbeaten Army and trailed 12–6 with one minute to play. Then Millner blocked an Army punt and recovered it for a touchdown and Notre Dame won 13–12.

In 1935, both Notre Dame and Ohio State University were unbeaten. Notre Dame trailed 13–0, but then scored two late touchdowns. Millner then caught a touchdown pass from Bill Shakespeare in the closing seconds to beat Ohio State, 18–13 and stayed undefeated.

== Professional career ==
Millner was drafted in the eighth round of the 1936 NFL draft by the Boston Redskins, with head coach Ray Flaherty seeing him as a major component to winning a league championship. After losing to the Green Bay Packers in the title game that year, the franchise moved to Washington, D.C. in 1937 and defeated the Chicago Bears 28–21 to win the title. Millner played a big role in the victory, catching touchdown passes of 55 and 78 yards from Sammy Baugh.

Millner entered the United States Navy during World War II and after three years away, returned to the Redskins for one final season in 1945 before retiring.

During his seven seasons, he caught 124 passes for 1,578 yards, a 12.7 average, and 12 touchdowns.

=== Pro Football Hall of Fame ===
In 1968, Millner was enshrined in the Pro Football Hall of Fame, becoming only the third Notre Dame player (to that point) to earn the honor. A touching moment took place during the induction ceremonies, when the large crowd there to cheer for former teammate Cliff Battles, also chose to give Millner a huge ovation. Millner had only been accompanied by his wife, Sara.

== Coaching career ==
While playing for the Redskins, Millner was an assistant coach with The Catholic University of America's Cardinals, and went with them to the 1940 Sun Bowl. After having served as a player-coach in 1945, Millner became a full-time assistant for the team the following year, spending three seasons in that role. In 1949, he moved to the All-America Football Conference as a Chicago Hornets assistant, then spent the next year in the same role with the original Baltimore Colts.

In 1951, he was hired as an assistant with the Philadelphia Eagles under Bo McMillin, but when McMillin was diagnosed with terminal stomach cancer, Millner was elevated to interim head coach. He resigned prior to the start of the 1952 NFL season, citing health problems. However, just 17 days after his decision, he accepted an assistant coaching position with the Redskins.

Millner stayed as an assistant until 1957, when he accepted an assistant coaching position at Hardin–Simmons University, working under his old cohort, Baugh. After just one season, Millner resigned the post and worked as a car salesman until returning to the Redskins as a scout in 1963, the same year he suffered his first heart attack.

Millner returned to coaching one final time when he served one year as an assistant with the World Football League's Florida Blazers under former Redskin Jack Pardee in 1974. Originally, the team was scheduled to begin play as the Virginia Ambassadors before financial considerations forced the move.

== Death ==
Millner died of a heart attack in 1976. The entire Redskins organization attended his funeral.

== See also ==
- List of select Jewish football players
