= Art Buss =

American football player (1911–1998)

No. 10, 45, 12
- Position: Tackle

Personal information
- Born: July 14, 1911; St. Joseph, Michigan, U.S.
- Died: March 23, 1998 (aged 86); Chelsea, Michigan, U.S.

Career information
- College: Michigan State

Career history
- Chicago Bears (1934–1935); Philadelphia Eagles (1936–1937)

Awards and highlights
- Second-team All-American (1933)

Career statistics
- Games played: 45
- Games started: 34

Arthur T. Buss (July 14, 1911 – March 23, 1998) was an American professional football player who was a tackle in the National Football League (NFL). He played college football for the Michigan State Spartans. Buss played four seasons for the Chicago Bears and the Philadelphia Eagles. In 1936, Buss was traded by the Bears to the Eagles during the inaugural NFL draft in exchange for first overall selection, Jay Berwanger.
