= Paul Pauk =

American football player (1912–1941)

Profile
- Position: Back

Personal information
- Born: 1912; Connecticut, U.S.
- Died: January 4, 1941 (aged 28–29); New Haven, Connecticut, U.S.
- Listed height: 5 ft 10 in (1.78 m)
- Listed weight: 170 lb (77 kg)

Career information
- High school: Branford; Worcester
- College: Princeton (1932–1935)

Paul Henry Pauk (1912 – January 4, 1941) was an American football back. He played three seasons at Princeton University, winning two national championships.

== Biography ==
Pauk was born in 1912 in Connecticut. He attended Branford High School before going to Worcester Academy. After his time at Worcester, Pauk played college football at Princeton University. During his three years of football, they won two national championships, and lost only one game. He played on the 1936 East-West All-Star team after his senior year. Following his career at Princeton, he was selected with the 73rd pick of the 1936 NFL draft by the Philadelphia Eagles. He did not play with the Eagles. Pauk died on January 4, 1941, in New Haven, Connecticut, after a long illness. He was 28 at the time of his death.
