= Flavio Tosi (American football) =

American football player (1912–1994)

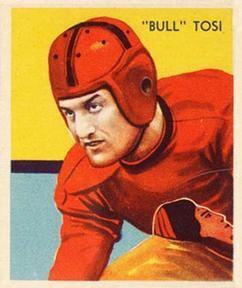

Profile
- Position: End

Personal information
- Born: April 30, 1912; Beverly, Massachusetts, U.S.
- Died: December 28, 1994 (aged 82); Beverly, Massachusetts, U.S.

Career information
- College: Boston College

Career history
- 1934–1936: Boston Redskins

Flavio Joseph "Bull" Tosi (April 30, 1912 – December 28, 1994) was an American football player and coach.

Tosi was born in 1912 at Beverly, Massachusetts, and attended Beverly High School. He played college football as an end for the Boston College Eagles football teams from 1929 to 1933.

Tosi joined the Boston Redskins of the National Football League (NFL) in August 1934; he was the first Boston College player to play in the NFL. He played for the Redskins from 1934 to 1936 and for the Providence Steam Roller in 1937. He appeared in 28 NFL games, scored two touchdowns, and tallied 265 receiving yards. He was also the head coach of the 1937 Providence team.

After his football career ended, Tosi worked as an employee benefits administrator for 34 years with General Electric. Tosi became ill with cancer in the mid-1970s and retired in 1977. He died in 1994 in Beverly, Massachusetts.
