= Don Irwin =

American football player (1913–1983)

No. 40, 9, 23
- Positions: Fullback, Halfback

Personal information
- Born: July 22, 1913; New York City, New York, U.S.
- Died: June 8, 1983 (aged 69); Detroit, Michigan, U.S.
- Listed height: 6 ft 1 in (1.85 m)
- Listed weight: 196 lb (89 kg)

Career information
- High school: Utica (NY) Free Academy
- College: Colgate (1932-1935)
- NFL draft: 1936: 7th round, 56th overall pick

Career history

Playing
- Syracuse-Rochester Braves (1936); New York Yankees (1936); Boston/Washington Redskins (1936–1939)

Coaching
- Syracuse-Rochester Braves (1936) Head coach

Awards and highlights
- NFL champion (1937)

Career NFL statistics
- Rushing yards: 586
- Rushing average: 3.4
- Receptions: 27
- Receiving yards: 289
- Total touchdowns: 6
- Stats at Pro Football Reference

Donald Emerson Irwin (July 22, 1913 – June 8, 1983) was an American professional football running back in the National Football League (NFL) for the Boston/Washington Redskins. He played college football at Colgate University and was drafted in the seventh round of the 1936 NFL draft.
