= Pepper Constable =

American football player (1914–1986)

Profile
- Position: Back

Personal information
- Born: April 24, 1914; Baltimore, Maryland, U.S.
- Died: August 13, 1986 (aged 72); Nantucket, Massachusetts, U.S.
- Listed height: 6 ft 1 in (1.85 m)
- Listed weight: 189 lb (86 kg)

Career information
- High school: Gilman School
- College: Princeton (1932–1935)

William Pepper Constable Jr. (24 April 1914 – 13 August 1986) was an American football back.

Constable was born on April 24, 1914, in Baltimore. His father was a Maryland lawyer. He attended high school at Gilman School before playing college football at Princeton. He was the president of class from 1934 to 1935 and named football team captain in '35. During his three seasons of football, the Tigers lost only one game, and won two national championships. He would bet against his team before each game because he "firmly believed that the wager brings a victory to the Tiger and a loss to himself." Constable finished fourth in the 1935 Heisman Trophy voting and was subsequently selected in the 1936 NFL draft by the Philadelphia Eagles. Rather than pursue a career in the National Football League (NFL), where he was selected 64th overall, Constable pursued a medical career, earning a Doctor of Medicine from Harvard University. After serving in World War II as a lieutenant commander, he became the Princeton University chief of medicine. Constable died on August 13, 1986, in Nantucket, Massachusetts. He was 72 and died after drowning.
