= Wingback (American football) =

Playing position in American football

Offensive formation with a wingback (WB)

A wingback (WB) is an offensive backfield position in American football.

A wingback or flexback lines up off the line of scrimmage, generally a step behind, and outside of, a tight end. It is a versatile position, as the wingback may be called upon to block, take a handoff, or run downfield for a pass. An example of a formation that uses a wingback is the single-wing.

There are few contemporary college football or professional football teams that use the wingback position. Historically, Johnny Rodgers of Nebraska played as a wingback when he won the Heisman Trophy in 1972.
