= Eddie Britt (American football) =

American football player (1912–1978)

No. 12
- Positions: Tailback, fullback

Personal information
- Born: July 19, 1912; Lexington, Massachusetts, U.S.
- Died: November 21, 1978 (aged 66); Pelham, New Hampshire, U.S.
- Listed height: 6 ft 2 in (1.88 m)
- Listed weight: 205 lb (93 kg)

Career information
- High school: Lexington (MA)
- College: Holy Cross

Career history
- Boston/Washington Redskins (1936–1937); Brooklyn Dodgers (1938)

Awards and highlights
- NFL champion (1937)
- Stats at Pro Football Reference

Edward Joseph "Battleship" Britt (July 19, 1912 – November 21, 1978) was an American football tailback and fullback and naval officer. He played in the National Football League (NFL) for the Boston/Washington Redskins and the Brooklyn Dodgers. He played college football for the Holy Cross Crusaders. He also served as a lieutenant commander in the United States Navy.

== Early life ==
Britt was born in 1912 in Lexington, Massachusetts. He attended Lexington High School and then enrolled at the College of the Holy Cross. He played at the fullback position for the Holy Cross Crusaders football team from 1931 to 1934. He was known by the nickname "Battleship", while playing for Holy Cross.

== Professional football career ==
Britt played professional football for the Boston/Washington Redskins in 1936 and 1937. In 1936, he ranked eighth in the NFL with 294 passing yards.

== Later life ==
Britt later attended the United States Military Academy. During World War II, he served in the Navy in the South Pacific. After the war, he taught at Dartmouth College. He died in November 1978 at age 66 at Massachusetts General Hospital in Boston.
