= 1936 NFL season =

American football season

Regular season
- Duration: September 13 – December 13, 1936
- East Champions: Boston Redskins
- West Champions: Green Bay Packers

Championship Game
- Champions: Green Bay Packers

NFL teams: West, East

The 1936 NFL season was the 17th regular season of the National Football League. For the first time since the league was founded, there were no team transactions (neither a club folded nor did a new one join the NFL), and all league teams played the same number of games (12).

1936 was also the third season of the NFL's 12-year ban on black players.

The season ended when the Green Bay Packers defeated the Boston Redskins in the NFL Championship Game at the Polo Grounds in New York City, the first NFL title game to be held at a neutral venue.

This is also the only time in NFL history that a team declined home field advantage and elected to play at a neutral site: while the Eastern Division champion Redskins were the home team, franchise owner George Preston Marshall, the Packers, and the League mutually agreed to move the game from Fenway Park due to low ticket sales in Boston.

== Draft ==
The 1936 NFL draft, the first ever draft held by the NFL, was held on February 8, 1936, at Philadelphia's Ritz-Carlton Hotel. With the first pick, the Philadelphia Eagles selected halfback Jay Berwanger from the University of Chicago.

== Major rule changes ==
- A draft shall be held to assign all new players entering the league for the first time to teams in an arbitrary and equitable manner.
- The penalty for an illegal forward pass that is thrown beyond the line of scrimmage is five yards from the spot of the foul.

== Division races ==
In the Western Division, the Bears were 6–0 and the Packers were 5–1 midway through the 12-game season, with the Packers' only loss having been a 30–3 blowout against Chicago.

On November 1, Green Bay beat the Bears 21–10 to give both teams a 6–1 record. Both teams continued to win, and both were 9–1 as Thanksgiving approached. The Bears lost their last two games, while Green Bay won both, thus putting the Packers into the Championship Game.

In the Eastern Division, the Pittsburgh Pirates were at 6–5 and the Boston Redskins at 5–5 when they met on November 29 in Boston before a crowd of only 7,000. The Pirates lost 30–0, leaving 6–5 Boston and the 5–5–1 New York Giants as the remaining contenders. Boston and New York finished the season by playing each other on December 6, with the Redskins winning 14–0 before 18,000 spectators in the Polo Grounds.

The Eastern winner had the right to host the 1936 title game, but due to low attendance in Boston, George Preston Marshall, the Packers and the League mutually agreed to move the Championship Game to New York, where 29,545 turned out. Marshall would subsequently move the Redskins to Washington in 1937.

== Final standings ==
NFL Eastern Division
	W	L	T	PCT	DIV	PF	PA	STK
Boston Redskins	7	5	0	.583	6–2	149	110	W3
Pittsburgh Pirates	6	6	0	.500	6–1	98	187	L3
New York Giants	5	6	1	.455	3–3–1	115	163	L1
Brooklyn Dodgers	3	8	1	.273	2–5–1	92	161	L1
Philadelphia Eagles	1	11	0	.083	1–7	51	206	L11

Note: Tie games were not officially counted in the standings until 1972.

NFL Western Division
	W	L	T	PCT	DIV	PF	PA	STK
Green Bay Packers	10	1	1	.909	5–1–1	248	118	T1
Chicago Bears	9	3	0	.750	3–3	222	94	L2
Detroit Lions	8	4	0	.667	3–3	235	102	W1
Chicago Cardinals	3	8	1	.273	1–5–1	74	143	T1

== NFL Championship Game ==
Green Bay 21, Boston 6, at Polo Grounds, New York City, December 13, 1936

== Statistical leaders ==
The 1936 season marked the fifth year in which official statistics were tracked and retained by the NFL.

	Name	Team	Yards
Passing	1. Arnie Herber	Green Bay Packers	1,239
	2. Ed Matesic	Pittsburgh Pirates	850
	3. Pug Vaughan	Chicago Cardinals	546
Rushing	1. Tuffy Leemans	New York Giants	830
	2. Ace Gutowsky	Detroit Lions	827
	3. Dutch Clark	Detroit Lions	628
Receiving	1. Don Hutson	Green Bay Packers	536
	2. Bill Smith	Chicago Cardinals	414
	3. Bill Hewitt	Chicago Bears	358
Touchdowns	1. Don Hutson	Green Bay Packers	9
	2. Bill Hewitt	Chicago Bears	7
	2. Dutch Clark	Detroit Lions	7
	2. Cliff Battles	Boston Redskins	7

Source: Gary Gillette, et al. (eds.), The ESPN Pro Football Encyclopedia. First Edition. New York: Sterling Publishing, 2006; p. 1044.

== Coaching changes ==
- Boston Redskins: Eddie Casey was replaced by Ray Flaherty.
- Philadelphia Eagles: Lud Wray was replaced by Bert Bell.

== Stadium changes ==
The Philadelphia Eagles moved from the Baker Bowl to Philadelphia Municipal Stadium

== See also ==
- 1936 American Football League season
