= List of Pittsburgh Panthers football All-Americans =

This list of Pittsburgh Panthers football All-Americans includes those members of the Pittsburgh Panthers football team who have received All-American honors from one or more selector organizations. The Pittsburgh Panthers, commonly referred to as the Pitt Panthers, represent the University of Pittsburgh in the sport of American football, and they compete in the Football Bowl Subdivision (FBS) of the National Collegiate Athletic Association (NCAA) and the Coastal Division of the Atlantic Coast Conference (ACC).

Several selector organizations release annual lists of their All-America teams after each college football season, honoring the best players at each position. Selector organizations include football analysts, television networks, publications, media wire services, sports writers' associations, and coaches' associations. Traditionally, several of the selectors have recognized two or more tiers of All-Americans, referred to as the first team, second team, third team and honorable mentions.

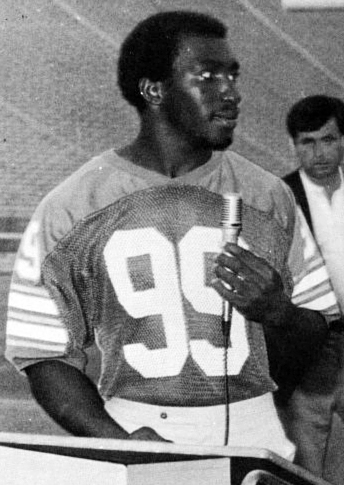
Hugh Green was a three-time consensus All-American and two-time unanimous All-American playing at defensive end

The NCAA currently recognizes the All-America teams of five selector organizations to determine "consensus All-Americans" and "unanimous All-Americans" in college football. The NCAA compiles consensus All-Americans using a point system based on the All-America teams from the five selector organizations. The point system consists of three points for a first-team selection, two points for a second-team selection, and one point for a third-team selection; no points are awarded for honorable mention selections. Since 1993, the NCAA-recognized selectors have included the American Football Coaches Association (AFCA), the Associated Press (AP), the Football Writers Association of America (FWAA), The Sporting News (SN), and the Walter Camp Football Foundation (WCFF), but the number of selectors used by the NCAA has varied over time, and has included different organizations in the past. The players receiving the most points at each position are recognized as consensus All-Americans; in order for a player to receive unanimous All-American recognition, he must be a first-team selection of all of the NCAA-recognized selector organizations.

Since the Pitt Panthers football team played its first season in 1890, at least 133 All-American selections have been bestowed on Pitt football players. 76 Panthers football players have received one or more selections as first-team All-Americans for a total of 92 all-time selections. Included among these players are 51 consensus All-Americans, which is the 12th most of any team. Of these, 14 were also unanimous All-Americans. The first Pitt player to be recognized as a first-team All-American was end J. Huber Wagner who was selected by Parke H. Davis, although Davis' selections are not listed in Pitt's Media Guide. Center Robert Peck, a three-time first team selection and member of the "Pop" Warner coached national championship teams of 1915 and 1916, was Pitt's first consensus All-American, a distinction that he earned twice. Peck, the first selection reported in Pitt's media guide, was elected into the College Football Hall of Fame following his playing days at the university.

== All-time Pitt All-American selections ==
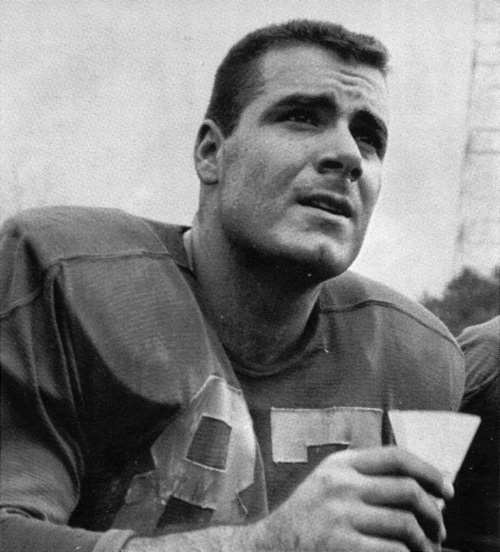
Joe Walton was both a First Team Athletic and Academic All-American in 1956

=== Key ===
^{†}	Consensus selection
^{‡}	Unanimous selection

-1 = First Team Selection
-2 = Second Team Selection
-3 = Third Team Selection
-4 = Fourth Team Selection

-t = tied for selection

[Defense] = selected for defensive team
[] other brackets following selectors indicated selections for alternate position if different from what is listed for each player (T=Tackle, HB=Halfback, FB=Fullback)

==== Selectors ====
- AAB = The All-America Board; the Christy Walsh Syndicate asked an Inter-Sectional Board of Football Coaches originally made up of Tad Jones of Yale, Knute Rockne of Notre Dame and Glenn "Pop" Warner of Stanford to deliberate and select an All-American team
- AFCA = American Football Coaches Association, first published in the Saturday Evening Post in 1945, were subsequently published in Collier's magazine between 1948 and 1956 as a replacement for Grantland Rice. AFCA selections since then have been published elsewhere under various sponsors.
- Athlon = Athlon Sports Communications
- AP = Associated Press based on a nationwide opinion poll of experts, including "newspaper sports editors and writers, Associated Press staff observers, officials and coaches in every section of the country."
- BP = Boston Post, selected by Charles E. Parker, football expert of the Boston Post
- BE = Billy Evans National Honor Roll, as culled from the selections of 200 sports editors
- CBS = CBS Sports
- CE = Collyer's Eye, selected by "sixty-seven nationally prominent football coaches, representing every major institution of learning, conference and district in the United States"
- CFN = College Football News (Tom Harmon)
- CH = College Humor magazine
- CNS = Consensus team based on combined selections of the United Press, Associated Press, NEA News Service and the Collier's Weekly team by Grantland Rice
- COL = Collier's Weekly, selected by Grantland Rice through 1947, sometimes with assistance from coaches such as Knute Rockne, Glenn Warner, Jesse Hawley, Fielding H. Yost, Robert Zuppke, Lou Young, Bill Roper, Wallace Wade, Dan McGugin and Clarence M. Price.
- CP = Central Press Association, billed as the "Real" All-American team with selections based on fan input with cooperation from "hundreds of newspapers throughout the country"; later known as the Captain's Poll selected by a poll of the captains of the major football teams
- CSW = College Sports Writers
- DJW = Davis J. Walsh, sports editor of the International News Service
- ESPN = ESPN
- FM = Frank G. Menke, Sporting Editor of the International News Service
- FN = Football News
- FW = Football World magazine, based on collected opinions of 267 coaches
- FWAA = Football Writers Association of America
- HSM = All-American team selected by 18,006 fans through nationwide contest sponsored by clothier Hart, Schaffner and Marx
- ID = Irving Dix
- INS = International News Service (the wire service of the Hearst newspapers later merged with UP to form UPI), based on "popular vote among sport writers and coaches, representing every major section of the country"; voters included Damon Runyon, Ford C. Frick, Tom Thorp, Dick Hylund, John Heisman, and Bill Corum
- JV = Jack Veiock, International News Service (INS) sports editor
- LIB = Liberty magazine: "Fifteen hundred and forty Intercollegiate players from 93 major universities voted, according to Norman L. Sper who conducted the selection for Liberty"
- LP = Lawrence Perry, a former Princetonian who wrote a nationally syndicated sports colyum called For The Game's Sake
- MM = Malcolm McLean
- MON = Monty, New York sports writer
- MS = Frank Menke Syndicate, by Frank G. Menke (sporting editor King Features Syndicate)
- NANA = North American Newspaper Alliance, originally selected by four noted coaches, Dan McGugin, Howard Jones, Bob Zuppke, and Bill Roper
- NB = Norman E. Brown of the Central Press
- NEA = Newspaper Enterprise Association, which stated "In the selection of these All-America players, the opinions of more than 100 coaches and football writers have been confidentially consulted", later, by the 33 members of the NEA Service National Board of Football Coaches, Officials and Sports Writers, and later by a committee of coaches; later selected by NEA sports editor Harry Grayson.
- NYP = New York Post
- NYS = The New York Sun
- NYT = The New York Times
- PD = Parke H. Davis, Princeton's representative on the football rules committee and noted football historian
- PFW = Pro Football Weekly
- PM = Philip Martin
- PP = Paul Purman, noted sports writer whose All-American team was syndicated in newspapers across the United States
- PS = Phil Steele
- PW = Paul Williamson
- Rivals = Rivals.com
- RO = Romelke Press Clipping Bureau, based on votes of "nearly every important pressman who has picked an All-American team."
- Scout = Scout.com
- SH = Scripps-Howard
- SI = Sports Illustrated
- TC = Tommy Clark
- Time = Time magazine
- TM = Robert "Tiny" Maxwell, of the Philadelphia Public Ledger
- TR = Ted A. Ramsay, an attempt to create a consensus All-American team using the selections of the six most prominent selectors: the All-America Board, NEA, UP, AP, New York Sun and New York World.
- TSN = The Sporting News
- TT = Tom Thorp, former captain of Columbia football team and head football coach at Fordham University in the New York Evening Journal
- UP = United Press, originally as selected by United Press sports editor Frank Getty, with advice from "coaches and officials throughout the country" and later "named by the United Press with the assistance and advice of more than 200 coaches, officials and experts from every part of the country"
- UPI = United Press International
- USAT = USA Today
- WC = Walter Camp, originally appearing in Collier's Weekly; following his death from the Walter Camp Football Foundation
- WD = Walter Dobbins, a consensus based on the selections of Collier's, the United Press, the Associated Press, the All America Board, the New York Sun, the North America Newspaper Alliance, and Hearst
- WE = Walter Eckersall, of the Chicago Tribune
- WT = The Washington Times

=== Selections ===
A list of football All-Americans at the University of Pittsburgh from all tiers and selectors follows. This list is assembled from historic, non-university sources but is likely incomplete, particularly for the list selectors for each individual. The University of Pittsburgh does not publish a list of All-Americans other than those that received first team honors, and that list can be found in the following section.

Year	Name	Position	Selectors
1913	Hube Wagner	End	PD-1, TT-2
1914	William H. Miller	Halfback	FM-3
1914	Bob Peck	Center	FM-1
1915	Andy Hastings	Halfback	FM-2
1915	James P. Herron	End	WC-2
1915	Bob Peck†	Center	WC-1, FM-1, MON-1, PD-1, TC-1
1916	Clifford Carlson	End	PP-2
1916	James DeHart	Quarterback	WE-1
1916	Andy Hastings	Halfback	UP-1, INS-1
1916	James P. Herron†	End	WC-2, INS-2, WE-1, MS
1916	Bob Peck†	Center	WC-1, UP-1, INS-1, WE-1, MON-1, PP-1, BP-1, MS
1916	Claude "Tiny" Thornhill	Guard	INS-1
1917	Clifford Carlson	End	WE-1, JV-1
1917	George "Tank" McLaren	Fullback	WC–2, INS, MS, WE-1 [HB], JV-1, PP-2
1917	Dale Seis†	Guard	WC-1, NEA, MS, PP-1
1917	Jock Sutherland†	Guard	INS, JV-1
1918	Tom Davies†	Halfback	WC-1, MS, TM-1
1918	Katy Easterday	Halfback	TM-1
1918	Skip Gougler	Halfback	TM-2
1918	William E. Harrington	End	TM-2
1918	Leonard Hilty†	Tackle	WC-1, TM-2
1918	George "Tank" McLaren†	Fullback	WC-2 [HB], MS, TM-1
1918	Jake Stahl	Guard	WC-2, TM-2
1920	Tom Davies	Halfback	WC-2, UP-1, WE-2, INS-2, FW, MS, NYT
1920	Herb Stein†	Center	WC-1, WE-2, MS
1921	Tom Davies	Halfback	FW-2, WC-2, BE-2 [FB]
1921	Herb Stein†	Center	FW-1, WC-3, LP-2, BE-1, WE-1, JV-1, MM-1
1921	Orville Hewitt	Fullback	NB-2
1922	Charley Bowser	Center	WE-1, BE, FM-1, RO-2
1922	Orville Hewitt	Fullback	RO-4
1922	Jack Sack	Guard	BE, RO-4
1923	Karl Bohren	Halfback	WC-3
1924	Zonar "Zeke" Wissinger	Tackle	WC-3
1925	Ralph Chase†	Tackle	AP-1, COL-1, AAB-1, NYS-2, WE-2, BE-2
1925	Zonar "Zeke" Wissinger	Guard	AAB-3
1927	Bill Kern	Tackle	INS-2, NYS-2, BE-1
1927	Gibby Welch‡	Halfback	AP-1, UP-1, COL-1, CP-1, INS-1, DJW-1, NYS-1, BE-1, LP-1, AAB
1928	Mike Getto†	Tackle	CO-1, NEA-1, WC-1, AP-2, UP-2, AAB
1929	Luby DiMeolo	Guard	INS-3 [T], NYP-2
1929	Joe Donchess‡	End	AP-1, UP-1, COL-1, NEA-1, INS-1, NANA-1, NYS-1, NYP-1, AAB-1, DJW-1, LP-1, WT
1929	Ray Montgomery†	Guard	AP-2, UP-1, COL-1, NEA-1, INS-1, NANA-2, NYS-2, AAB-1, DJW-1
1929	Thomas "Pug" Parkinson	Fullback	AP-2, UP-2, INS-1, NANA-2, NYS-1, NYP-2, DJW-2 [HB], LP-1, WT
1929	Octavius "Toby" Uansa	Halfback	AP-1, UP-3, NEA-2, INS-2, NANA-3, CP-1, WT
1930	Eddie Baker	Quarterback	NEA-3
1931	Ralph Daugherty	Center	AP-2, NEA-3, INS-3, CP-1, LP
1931	James MacMurdo	Tackle	AP-2, NEA-3, INS-3, HSM
1931	Jesse Quatse†	Tackle	UP-1, COL-1, CP-2, WC, CH-1, AAB
1932	Warren Heller‡	Halfback	AP-1, UP-1, COL-1 [FB], AAB-1, NEA-1, INS-1, CP-1, NYS-1, WC-1, TR-1, PM
1932	Joe Tormey	Center	UP-3
1932	Joe Skladany†	End	AP-2, UP-1, NEA-1, INS-1, CP-2, TR-1
1933	Joe Skladany†	End	AP-1, UP-3, COL-1, NANA-1, NEA-1, INS-1, CP-1, NYS-1, WC-1, DJW-1, WD-1, CNS
1933	Frank Walton	Tackle	UP-3, NANA-3
1934	Chuck Hartwig†	Guard	AP-1, INS-1, LIB-1, NANA-1, CP-1, NYS-1, WC-1
1934	Miller Munjas	Quarterback	AP-3, NANA-2
1934	Ken Ormiston	Guard	AP-3, INS-1, NYS-1
1934	George Shotwell†	Center	UP-1, NANA-2, CP-1
1934	Izzy Weinstock	Fullback	AP-2, NEA-1, NANA-1, CSW-2
1935	Art Detzel	Tackle	NEA-1
1935	Bobby Larue	Halfback	UP-3
1936	Bill Daddio	End	AP-3
1936	Ave Daniell†	Tackle	AP-1, UP-1, COL-1, NEA-1, CP-1
1936	Bill Glassford	Guard	AP-3, INS-1, CP-2
1937	Bill Daddio	End	UP-3
1937	Marshall Goldberg†	Halfback	AP-1, UP-1 [FB], COL-1, INS-1, NEA-1, CP-1, CE-1, WC-1
1937	Tony Matisi†	Tackle	AP-1, UP-2, INS-2, CE-1, WC-1
1937	Frank Souchak	End	UP-2, INS-2
1938	Bill Daddio	End	UP-1, PW-3
1938	Marshall Goldberg‡	Fullback	AP-1, UP-1, CP-1, COL-1, NEA-1, NYS-1, WC-1, ID-1, PW
1939	Richard Cassiano	Halfback	UP-3, NEA-3
1941	Ralph Fife	Guard	AP-1, UP-2, NEA-2, CP-3
1948	Nick Balkovak	Tackle	NEA-2
1949	Bernie Barkouskie	Guard	AP-3, AFCA-1, INS [Defense], NEA [Defense]
1952	Eldred Kraemer	Tackle	AP-2
1952	Joe Schmidt	Linebacker	INS-1
1953	Dick Dietrich	End	NEA-2
1953	Eldred Kraemer	Tackle	UP-3
1955	Joe Walton	End	CP
1956	Joe Walton‡	End	AP, UP, INS, CP, NEA, AFCA, WC, FWAA, TSN
1958	John Guzik†	Guard	UPI, NEA, WC, FWAA, TSN, Time
1960	Mike Ditka‡	End	AP, UPI, NEA, CP, WC, AFCA, FWAA, TSN, Time
1963	Paul Martha†	Back	NEA, CP, TSN
1963	Ernie Borghetti	Tackle	FWAA
1965	Eric Crabtree	Defensive back	Time
1973	Tony Dorsett	Running back	AP, NEA
1974	Gary Burley	Middle guard	WC
1975	Tony Dorsett	Running back	WC, AFCA, FWAA
1976	Tony Dorsett‡	Running back	AP, UPI, NEA, WC, AFCA, FWAA, TSN, FN, CFN
1976	Al Romano†	Middle guard	AP, UPI, NEA, WC, AFCA, FN
1977	Tom Brzoza†	Center	AP, UPI, WC
1977	Matt Cavanaugh	Quarterback	AFCA
1977	Randy Holloway†	Defensive tackle	UPI, NEA, WC, AFCA, FWAA, TSN, FN
1977	Bob Jury†	Defensive back	AP, WC, FWAA, TSN
1978	Hugh Green†	Defensive end	AP, UPI, WC
1978	Gordon Jones	Receiver	NEA, AFCA
1979	Hugh Green‡	Defensive end	AP, UPI, NEA, WC, AFCA, FWAA, TSN
1980	Hugh Green‡	Defensive end	AP, UPI, NEA, WC, AFCA, FWAA, TSN
1980	Mark May‡	Offensive tackle	AP, WC, UPI, AFCA, FWAA, TSN
1981	Jimbo Covert	Offensive tackle	NEA
1981	Julius Dawkins	Receiver	AP
1981	Dan Marino	Quarterback	NEA, WC, AFCA-t, TSN
1981	Sal Sunseri†	Linebacker	AP, AFCA, FWAA
1982	Jimbo Covert†	Offensive tackle	UPI, WC, AFCA, FWAA
1982	Bill Fralic	Offensive tackle	AP, NEA
1982	Bill Maas	Defensive tackle	TSN
1983	Bill Fralic‡	Offensive tackle	AP, UPI, NEA, WC, AFCA, FWAA, TSN
1984	Bill Fralic‡	Offensive tackle	AP, UPI, NEA, WC, AFCA, FWAA, TSN
1986	Randy Dixon†	Offensive tackle	UPI, WC, AFCA, TSN
1986	Tony Woods†	Defensive end	UPI, FWAA, TSN
1987	Ezekial Gadson	Linebacker	FWAA
1987	Craig Heyward†	Running back	AP, UPI, FWAA, SH, TSN
1988	Jerry Olsavsky	Linebacker	AFCA
1988	Mark Stepnoski†	Offensive guard	WC, AFCA, FWAA, TSN
1989	Marc Spindler	Defensive tackle	TSN
1990	Brian Greenfield†	Punter	UPI, WC, TSN, FWAA, SH
1994	Ruben Brown	Offensive tackle	AFCA, FN
2000	Antonio Bryant†	Receiver	AP, FWAA,Rivals
2003	Larry Fitzgerald‡	Receiver	AP, AFCA, WC, FWAA, TSN, PFW, SI, ESPN, Rivals
2003	Andy Lee	Punter	PFW
2006	H. B. Blades	Linebacker	FWAA, SI
2007	Scott McKillop	Linebacker	Scout
2007	Jeff Otah	Offensive tackle	PFW
2008	Scott McKillop	Linebacker	FWAA, CBS
2009	Dorin Dickerson	Tight end	FWAA, CBS
2010	Jabaal Sheard	Defensive end	AFCA
2013	Aaron Donald‡	Defensive tackle	AP, AFCA, FWAA, TSN, WC, USAT, CBS, ESPN, SI, Athlon
2014	James Conner	Running back	AFCA-1, AP-2, FWAA-2, PS-2, TSN-2, WC-2, USAT-2
2014	T. J. Clemmings	Offensive tackle	PS-2, FWAA-2
2014	Tyler Boyd	Wide receiver	SI-2, PS-3
2015	Tyler Boyd	Wide receiver	PS-3
2016	Quadree Henderson†	Kick returner	FWAA, WCFF, TSN, SI, USAT, FOX, CBS, AP-2, AFCA-2
2016	Dorian Johnson	Offensive guard	AFCA, TSN, SI, ESPN, WCFF-2
2016	Ejuan Price	Defensive end	AFCA-2, USAT-2, WCFF-2
2019	Jaylen Twyman	Defensive tackle	WCFF-2
2020	Rashad Weaver	Defensive end	AFCA-2

=== First Team selections ===
Pitt recognizes, per listing in its football media guide, 76 different players as having been selected as First Team All-American throughout its history for a total of 92 all-time First Team All-American Selections. That total includes 51 selections which have attained Consensus status per the NCAA official records book. Pitt's Consensus First Team selections ranks as the twelfth most consensus All-Americans among Division I FBS schools. The following list of Pitt's First Team All-Americans is compiled for the Pitt football media guide from various sources including the NCAA Football Guide, and consists of players who were first-team selections on one or more of the All American teams which were made over the years by Walter Camp, Grantland Rice, Caspar Whitney, International News Service, Associated Press, United Press International, NANA, NEA, the Football Writers Association of America, the Football Coaches Association, the All-America Board, Newsweek, The Sporting News, and Sports Illustrated.

First Team All-American Selections

Year	Name	Pos.
1914	Robert Peck	C
1915	Robert Peck*	C
1916	Robert Peck*	C
1916	James Herron*	E
1916	Andy Hastings	F
1916	Claude Thornhill	G
1917	H.C. "Doc" Carlson	E
1917	Jock Sutherland*	G
1917	Dale Sies*	G
1917	George McLaren	F
1918	Leonard Hilty*	T
1918	Tom Davies*	B
1918	George McLaren*	F
1920	Tom Davies	B
1920	Herb Stein*	C
1921	Herb Stein*	C
1925	Ralph Chase*	T
1927	Bill Kern	T
1927	Gilbert Welch^{#}	B

Year	Name	Pos.
1928	Mike Getto*	T
1929	Joe Donchess^{#}	E
1929	Ray Montgomery*	G
1929	Toby Uansa	H
1929	Thomas Parkinson	B
1931	Jesse Quatse*	T
1932	Joe Skladany*	E
1932	Warren Heller^{#}	B
1933	Joe Skladany*	E
1934	Charles Hartwig*	E
1934	George Shotwell*	G
1934	Izzy Weinstock	C
1935	Art Detzel	T
1936	Averell Daniell*	T
1936	William Glassford	G
1937	Frank Souchak	E
1937	Bill Daddio	E
1937	Tony Matisi*	T
1937	Marshall Goldberg*	B

Year	Name	Pos.
1938	Marshall Goldberg^{#}	B
1938	Bill Daddio	E
1941	Ralph Fife	G
1949	Bernie Barkouskie	G
1952	Eldred Kraemer	T
1952	Joe Schmidt	LB
1956	Joe Walton^{#}	E
1958	John Guzik*	G
1960	Mike Ditka^{#}	E
1963	Paul Martha*	B
1963	Ernie Borghetti	T
1973	Tony Dorsett	RB
1974	Tony Dorsett	RB
1974	Gary Burley	MG
1975	Tony Dorsett	RB
1976	Tony Dorsett^{#}	RB
1976	Al Romano*	MG
1977	Matt Cavanaugh	QB
1977	Randy Holloway*	DT

Year	Name	Pos.
1977	Bob Jury*	DB
1977	Tom Brzoza*	C
1978	Hugh Green*	DE
1978	Gordon Jones	WR
1979	Hugh Green^{#}	DE
1980	Hugh Green^{#}	DE
1980	Mark May^{#}	OT
1981	Sal Sunseri*	LB
1981	Jimbo Covert	OT
1981	Dan Marino	QB
1981	Julius Dawkins	SE
1982	Jimbo Covert*	OT
1982	Bill Maas	DT
1982	Bill Fralic	OT
1983	Bill Fralic^{#}	OT
1984	Bill Fralic^{#}	OT
1986	Randy Dixon*	OT
1986	Tony Woods*	DE
1987	Ezekial Gadson	LB

Year	Name	Pos.
1987	Craig Heyward*	RB
1988	Mark Stepnoski*	OG
1988	Jerry Olsavsky	LB
1989	Marc Spindler	DT
1990	Brian Greenfield*	P
1994	Ruben Brown	OT
2000	Antonio Bryant*	WR
2003	Larry Fitzgerald^{#}	WR
2006	H.B. Blades	LB
2008	Scott McKillop	LB
2009	Dorin Dickerson	TE
2010	Jabaal Sheard	DE
2013	Aaron Donald^{#}	DT
2014	James Conner	RB
2016	Quadree Henderson*	KR
2016	Dorian Johnson	OG
2020	Patrick Jones II*	DE
2020	Rashad Weaver*	DE
2021	Jordan Addison*	WR
2021	Cal Adomitis	LS
2021	Kenny Pickett	QB

*indicates Consensus status. ^{#}indicates unanimous selection. Ref:

=== Academic All-Americans ===
Pitt has had 15 different football players named as College Sports Information Directors of America Academic-All Americans for a total of 23 selections. In addition, five Pitt players have been named as a National Scholar-Athletes by the National Football Foundation and three players have awarded NCAA Postgraduate Scholarships.

Academic Honors

Name	Year(s)	Selection	Position
Dave Blandino	1973	NFF	OL
Ralph Cindrich	1971	AA	LB
Vince Crochunis	2002, 2003, 2004	AA	DL
Dick Deitrick	1952	AA	E
Jeff Delaney	1976, 1978; 1978; 1979	AA; NFF; NCAA	DB
Wayne DiBartola	1981	AA	RB
Rob Fada	1981, 1982	AA	OL
Al Grigaliunas	1963	NFF	E
John Guzik	1958	AA	G
Connor Lee	2008	AA	PK

Name	Year(s)	Selection	Position
Bill Lindner*	1959	AA	T
Greg Meisner	1979, 1980	AA	DL
Lou Palatella	1954	AA	T
J.C. Pelusi	1982	AA	DL
Louis Riddick	1989, 1990	AA	DB
Robert Schilken	1986	NCAA	DE
Dan Stephens	2003, 2004	AA	DL
Mark Stepnoski	1986, 1988; 1988; 1989	AA; NFF; NCAA	OL
Todd Toerper	1974	NFF	WR
Joe Walton	1956	AA	E

AA = Academic All-American; NCAA = NCAA Postgraduate Scholarship; NFF = National Football Foundation National Scholar-Athlete Ref:
^{*Listed as an Academic All-American in Pitt's Media Guide but not by CoSIDA.}
