= 1934 All-Eastern football team =

College football honor

The 1934 All-Eastern football team consists of American football players chosen by various selectors as the best players at each position among the Eastern colleges and universities during the 1934 college football season.

Four players were selected to the first team by all four of the known selectors: quarterback Buzz Borries of Navy; halfback Jack Buckler of Army; tackle Jim Steen of Syracuse; and guard Chuck Hartwig for Pittsburgh.

The 1934 Pittsburgh Panthers football team were recognized as the 1934 national champion and placed seven players on at least one of the first-team All-Eastern teams.

Three Eastern players received All-Eastern honors and were also consensus picks on the 1934 All-America college football team: guard Chuck Hartwig of Pittsburgh; halfback Buzz Borries of Navy; and center George Shotwell of Pittsburgh.

== All-Eastern selections ==
=== Quarterbacks ===
- Buzz Borries, Navy (AP-1 [hb], CP-1, AK, JS-1)
- Miller Munjas, Pittsburgh (AP-1)
- Kats Kadlic, Princeton (AP-2)
- Thomas Tomb, Columbia (CP-2)

=== Halfbacks ===
- Jack Buckler, Army (AP-1, CP-1, AK, JS-1)
- Mike Nicksick, Pittsburgh (CP-1)
- Bill Shepherd, Western Maryland (AP-2, AK)
- Tuffy Leemans, George Washington (JS-1)
- Garry Levan, Princeton (AP-2)
- Pepper Constable, Princeton (CP-2)
- Tony Sarausky, Fordham (CP-2)

=== Fullbacks ===
- Izzy Weinstock, Pittsburgh (AP-1, CP-2, AK, JS-1)
- David Smukler, Temple (AP-2, CP-1)

=== Ends ===
- Joe Bogdanski, Colgate (AP-1, CP-2, AK, JS-1)
- Lester Borden, Fordham (AP-1, AK)
- William Shuler, Army (CP-1)
- Harvey Rooker, Pittsburgh (CP-1)
- Tod Goodwin, West Virginia (JS-1)
- Larry Kelley, Yale (AP-2, CP-2)
- Ed Furey, Columbia (AP-2)

=== Tackles ===
- Jim Steen, Syracuse (AP-1, CP-1, AK, JS-1)
- Slade Cutter, Navy (AP-1, CP-1)
- Joe Stydahar, West Virginia (AK)
- Lewis Brooke, Colgate (AP-2, JS-1)
- Ed Harvey, Holy Cross (AP-2)
- Joe Stydahar, West Virginia (CP-2)
- Cliff Dolloway, Carnegie Tech (CP-2)

=== Guards ===
- Chuck Hartwig, Pittsburgh (AP-1, CP-1, AK, JS-1)
- Ken Ormiston, Pittsburgh (AP-1, CP-2, JS-1)
- Robert M. Stillman, Army (AP-2, CP-1)
- James Moran Sr., Holy Cross (AK)
- Herman Gundlach, Harvard (AP-2, CP-2)

=== Centers ===
- George Shotwell, Pittsburgh (AP-1, CP-1, JS-1)
- Peter P. Stevens, Temple (AK)
- Mose Kalbaugh, Princeton (AP-2)
- Tony Morandos, Holy Cross (CP-2)

== Key ==
- AP = Associated Press
- CP = Central Press Association, selected by the football captains of the Eastern teams
- AK = Andrew Kerr, head coach of Colgate
- JS = Jock Sutherland, head coach of Pittsburgh

== See also ==
- 1934 College Football All-America Team
