= Thomas Parkinson (disambiguation) =

Thomas Parkinson or Tom Parkinson may refer to:

- Thomas Parkinson (1920–1992) professor of English and poet
- Thomas Parkinson (painter) (1744–c. 1789), British portrait artist
- Thomas Parkinson (priest) (1744/5–1830), archdeacon of Huntingdon, and of Leicester
- Thomas Parkinson (MP) for Berwick-upon-Tweed (UK Parliament constituency) 1584–97
- Thomas Parkinson (American football), see List of Pittsburgh Panthers football All-Americans
- Tom Parkinson (filmmaker), see The Adventures of the Black Stallion
- Tom Parkinson, character in Rattlers
