= Buzz Borries =

American football player (1911–1969)

No. 10 – Navy Midshipmen
- Position: Halfback
- Class: Graduate

Personal information
- Born: December 13, 1911; Louisville, Kentucky, U.S.
- Died: January 3, 1969 (aged 57); Orange Park, Florida, U.S.
- Listed height: 6 ft 0 in (1.83 m)
- Listed weight: 175 lb (79 kg)

Career information
- High school: Kavanaugh Academy (Lawrenceburg)
- College: Navy (1932–1934)

Awards and highlights
- Consensus All-American (1934); First-team All-Eastern (1934)
- College Football Hall of Fame

Fred "Buzz" Borries Jr. (December 13, 1911 – January 3, 1969) was an American college football player who played halfback for the Navy Midshipmen football team of the U.S. Naval Academy from 1932 to 1934.

Borries was born in Louisville, Kentucky, and attended Kavanaugh Academy in Lawrenceburg. There, he played basketball and in 1930 led his team to the finals of the state basketball tournament. He was subsequently inducted into the Kentucky High School Basketball Hall of Fame.

As a junior halfback for the Navy Midshipmen in 1933, he scored the Midshipmen's sole touchdown to give Navy a 7–0 victory over the Notre Dame Fighting Irish; it was Navy's first victory in the Navy–Notre rivalry series in seven years. In 1934, he helped Navy score its first victory over the Army Black Knights football team since 1921. Against Army, Borries carried the ball 36 times and set up Slade Cutter's field goal for Navy to win 3–0. He was recognized as a consensus first-team All-American following his 1934 senior season and received the Naval Academy Athletic Association sword during graduation ceremonies.

The sword is presented to the midshipman of the graduating class declared by the Association's Athletic Committee to have personally excelled in athletics during his years of varsity competition.

After graduating the U.S. Naval Academy in 1935, Borries was commissioned as an officer in the U.S. Navy. Nine years later, Borries was a commander serving aboard the U.S. Navy Casablanca class escort aircraft carrier the USS Gambier Bay (CVE-73) as the ship's Air Officer during World War II. As the carrier's Air Officer in charge of Flight Operations, he was able to launch all of the ship's Grumman FM2 "Wildcat" fighters and Grumman TBM "Avenger" torpedo bombers of VC-10 Squadron while the ship was under heavy fire from Japanese navy battleships and cruisers during the Battle off Samar in Leyte Gulf. After the Gambier Bay was sunk by enemy shellfire, Borries took charge of a group of the ship's life rafts and was credited with saving the lives of 200 of this fellow crew members during their 45 hours adrift in the waters of the Pacific. Borries was later awarded the Bronze Star for his heroic conduct under enemy fire during the battle, his leadership while adrift, and saving the lives of his crew members.

Borries was inducted into the College Football Hall of Fame in 1960.
