= James Stacy (disambiguation) =

James Stacy was the stage name of Maurice William Elias (1936–2016), an American film and television actor

James Stacy may also refer to:

- James William Stacy, better known as Red Stacy (1912–1998), American football player
- James D. Stacy, better known as Jim Stacy (1930–2016), American entrepreneur

== See also ==
- Jay Stacy (born 1968), Australian former field hockey midfielder
