= 1933 All-Eastern football team =

American all-star college football team

The 1933 All-Eastern football team consists of American football players chosen by various selectors as the best players at each position among the Eastern colleges and universities during the 1933 college football season.

== All-Eastern selections ==
=== Quarterbacks ===
- Cliff Montgomery, Columbia (AP-1 [hb], UP-1, CP)
- Paul Johnson, Army (AP-1)
- George Randour, Villanova (AP-2)
- Eck Allen, West Virginia (AP-3)

=== Halfbacks ===
- Jack Buckler, Army (AP-1, UP-1, CP)
- Ed Danowski, Fordham (AP-2, UP-1, CP)
- Garrett LeVan, Princeton (AP-3, CP)
- Mike Sebastian, Pittsburgh (AP-2)
- Heinie Weisenbaugh, Pittsburgh (AP-3)

=== Fullbacks ===
- Izzy Weinstock, Pittsburgh (AP-1, UP-1)
- Bill Clark, Navy (AP-2)
- Reds Pollock, Penn (AP-3)

=== Ends ===
- Joe Skladany, Pittsburgh (AP-1, UP-1, CP)
- Red Matal, Columbia (AP-2, UP-1, CP)
- Lester Borden, Fordham (AP-1)
- Flavio Tosi, Boston College (AP-2)
- Kenneth Fairman, Princeton (AP-3)
- Kopesak, Army (AP-3)

=== Tackles ===
- Charles Harvey, Holy Cross (AP-1, UP-1, CP)
- Charles Ceppi, Princeton (AP-1, UP-1, CP)
- Bob Michelet, Dartmouth (AP-2)
- Jim Steen, Syracuse (AP-3)
- David Kopans, Harvard (AP-3)

=== Guards ===
- Harvey Jablonsky, Army (AP-1, UP-1, CP)
- George Rado, Duquesne (AP-1)
- David Zabriskie, Navy (UP-1)
- Bunny Burzio, Carnegie Tech (AP-2, CP)
- Ralph Wolfendale, Fordham (AP-3)
- Blum, Colgate (AP-3)

=== Centers ===
- Johnny Dell Isola, Fordham (AP-1, UP-1, CP)
- Eagle, Penn (AP-2)
- Harbold, Navy (AP-3)

== Key ==
- AP = Associated Press
- UP = United Press
- CP = Central Press Association, selected by the football captains of the Eastern teams

== See also ==
- 1933 College Football All-America Team
