= John A. Speziale =

American judge (1922–2005)

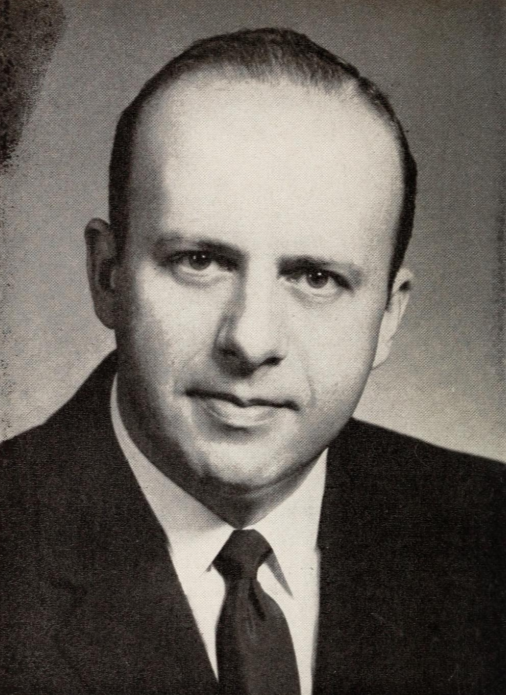

Chief Justice of the Connecticut Supreme Court
- In office 1981–1984
- Governor: William A. O'Neill
- Preceded by: Joseph Bogdanski
- Succeeded by: Ellen Ash Peters

Associate Justice of the Connecticut Supreme Court
- In office 1977–1981
- Governor: Ella Grasso; William A. O'Neill

70th Treasurer of Connecticut
- In office 1959 – November 15, 1961
- Governor: John N. Dempsey
- Preceded by: John Attaviano Jr.
- Succeeded by: Donald J. Irwin

Personal details
- Born: November 21, 1922 Winsted, Connecticut, United States of America
- Died: January 3, 2005 (age 82) Torrington, Connecticut, United States of America
- Party: Democratic
- Education: Duke University (BA); Duke University School of Law (JD)

Military service
- Allegiance: United States of America
- Branch/service: US Navy
- Years of service: 1942-1946
- Rank: Lieutenant

John Albert Speziale (November 21, 1922 – January 3, 2005) was an American lawyer who served as Justice of the Connecticut Supreme Court from 1977 to 1984, serving as its first Italian-American chief justice from 1981 to 1984.

== Early life ==
Speziale was born in Winsted, Connecticut on November 21, 1922, to Mary and Louis Speziale, who were Sicilian immigrants. His father, Louis Speziale, was a former member of the Torrington City Council. He graduated from Torrington High School in 1940 and received a B.A. in economics from Duke University in 1943, followed by a J.D. from Duke University School of Law in 1947. From 1942 to 1946, he served in the United States Navy on a destroyer in the Pacific Theater of World War II as a lieutenant.

== Career ==
In 1948, he was admitted to the Connecticut Bar Association, and became the Torrington Municipal Court judge in 1949. In 1958, Speziale was elected as the Connecticut State Treasurer. He served while continuing his private practice until he was promoted in 1961 to the Connecticut Court of Common Pleas, and was promoted again in 1965 to the Connecticut Superior Court, becoming its chief judge from 1975 to 1977. While on the Connecticut Superior Court, Speziale was noted for his decision in the Peter Reilly murder case where he declared Reilly innocent non obstante verdicto after reviewing further evidence not presented during the case.

In 1977, Governor Ella Grasso nominated Speziale to the Connecticut Supreme Court. On April 15, 1978, Speziale became a chief court administrator, and was known for implementing the merging of the Connecticut Court of Common Pleas and Connecticut Juvenile Court with the Connecticut Superior Court.

In 1981, Governor William A. O'Neill appointed Speziale to the position of Chief Justice of the Connecticut Supreme Court, succeeding Justice Joseph Bogdanski. Speziale served from 1981 to 1984.

== Later life and death ==
On November 21, 1984, Speziale retired from the Connecticut Supreme Court and returned to private law practice.

Speziale died of cancer on January 3, 2005, in Torrington, Connecticut, at the age of 82.

Political offices
Preceded by Joseph Bogdanski	Chief Justice of the Connecticut Supreme Court; 1981–1984	Succeeded by Ellen Ash Peters
