= Gail O'Brien =

American football player and coach (1911–1978)

No. 22
- Position: Tackle

Personal information
- Born: November 14, 1911; Cheyenne, Wyoming, U.S.
- Died: July 7, 1978 (aged 66); Los Angeles County, California, U.S.

Career information
- High school: Omaha South (NE)
- College: Nebraska

Career history
- Boston Redskins (1934–1936)

Awards and highlights
- First-team All-Big Six (1933)

Career statistics
- Games played: 32
- Games started: 20
- Stats at Pro Football Reference

Joseph Gail O'Brien (November 14, 1911 – July 7, 1978) was an American football tackle in the National Football League (NFL) for the Boston Redskins. He played college football at the University of Nebraska. After retiring from professional football, O'Brien became the offensive line coach at Loyola University of Los Angeles—now known as Loyola Marymount University—in 1946, under head coach Tony DeLellis.
