= Buster Maddox =

American football player (1911–1956)

No. 28
- Position: Tackle

Personal information
- Born: November 4, 1911; Greenville, Texas, U.S.
- Died: March 14, 1956 (aged 44); Lubbock, Texas, U.S.
- Listed height: 6 ft 3 in (1.91 m)
- Listed weight: 225 lb (102 kg)

Career information
- High school: Greenville (Hunt County, Texas)
- College: Kansas State (1931–1934)

Career history
- Green Bay Packers (1935)

Awards and highlights
- First-team All-American (1934); First-team All-Big Six (1934); Second-team All-Big Six (1933)

Career statistics
- Games played: 1
- Games started: 1
- Stats at Pro Football Reference

George Woodrow "Buster" Maddox (November 4, 1911 – March 14, 1956) was an American professional football player. A tackle, he played college football for the Kansas State Wildcats and was named a first-team All-American as a senior. He later played one game in the National Football League (NFL) for the Green Bay Packers.

== Biography ==
Maddox was born on November 4, 1911, in Greenville, Texas. His brother, Oss Maddox, was a football coach. He attended Greenville High School and was the school's first alumnus to play in the NFL. In 1931, after high school, he enrolled at Kansas State Agricultural College. He then won a varsity letter for the Kansas State Wildcats football team in 1932. He was considered a "powerhouse at tackle", but missed the start of the 1933 season due to an infection that required an operation. After recovering, he performed well and his play was reported in The Manhattan Mercury to be "equaling the work of any tackle in the Big Six Conference". He helped the Wildcats compile a record of 6–2–1 and was named an All-Big Six selection.

After the 1933 season, Maddox was named Kansas State's team captain for 1934. As captain, he led the team to a 7–2–1 record and a 5–0 mark in Big Six play, winning the conference title for the first time in school history. Maddox was unanimously selected first-team All-Big Six as well as first-team All-American. He was the second first-team All-American in school history. According to the book Wildcats to Powercats, Maddox, who stood at 6 feet 3 inches (1.91 m) and weighed 240 pounds (110 kg), was "one of Kansas State's first great linemen ... with his ferocious blocking and tackling skills." At the conclusion of his collegiate career, he accepted an invitation to the East–West Shrine Game and was selected for the Chicago Charities College All-Star Game.

In February 1935, Maddox signed to play professional football with the Green Bay Packers of the National Football League (NFL). He suffered an injury while practicing for the Chicago All-Star Game and later was injured in training with the Packers, resulting in him seeing little playing time. He appeared in only one game, as a starter, and was then released in October 1935.

After his stint in professional football, Maddox lived in Topeka, Kansas, until World War II. He served in the war as a member of the United States Army. He participated in battles in Germany as a member of the 3rd Infantry Division and reached the rank of captain before being discharged. Maddox worked as a representative for the American Empire Insurance company and was married to the former Jane Kahl, with whom he had a son. He was ill at the end of his life and died on March 14, 1956, in Lubbock, Texas, at the age of 44. He was buried in Greenville. Maddox was posthumously inducted into the Kansas State Athletics Hall of Fame in 2000.
