= Johnny Dell Isola =

American football player (1912–1986)

Johnny Del Isola
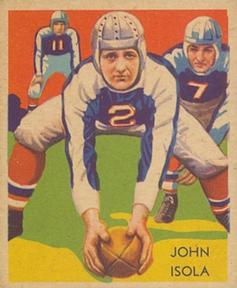

No. 2
- Position: Offensive linemen

Personal information
- Born: February 12, 1912; Everett, Massachusetts, U.S.
- Died: October 23, 1986 (aged 74); Arlington, Massachusetts, U.S.
- Listed height: 5 ft 11 in (1.80 m)
- Listed weight: 201 lb (91 kg)

Career information
- High school: Everett (MA)
- College: Fordham

Career history
- New York Giants (1934–1940)

Awards and highlights
- 2× NFL champion (1934, 1938); Second-team All-American (1933); First-team All-Eastern (1933)
- Stats at Pro Football Reference

John Joseph Del Isola (February 12, 1912 – October 23, 1986) was an American professional football offensive lineman for the New York Giants of the National Football League (NFL).
