= Elinor Carbone =

American politician

Mayor of Torrington
- In office December 2, 2013 – 2025
- Preceded by: Ryan Bingham; Gerry Zordan (interim)

Torrington City Council
- In office 2007–2013

Torrington Board of Education
- In office 2003–2007

Personal details
- Born: Elinor LaCasse; May 11, 1957 (age 69) Torrington, Connecticut, U.S.
- Party: Republican
- Spouse: Gerard Carbone (m. 1979)
- Children: 3
- Education: Naugatuck Valley Community College
- Occupation: Paralegal

Elinor Carbone is a Connecticut politician who served as mayor of Torrington, Connecticut from 2013 to 2025. She previously served on both the Board of Education and the Torrington City Council.

== Early life ==
Carbone was born in Torrington. She attended Torrington High School, where she met her husband Gerard. She obtained an associate degree in medical assisting from Naugatuck Valley Community College. Prior to being elected mayor, Carbone worked as a probate paralegal in Litchfield.

== Career ==
Carbone served on both the Torrington City Council and the Torrington Board of Education. Carbone also served as a member of the Torrington Development Corp. from 2006 to 2012, the Charter Revision Commission from 2011 to 2012, the Blue Ribbon Commission from 2009 to 2012 and as a liaison to the Mayor's Committee on Youth from 2007 to 2013.

Carbone was first elected mayor in 2013, having received the endorsement of the incumbent mayor Ryan Bingham, and former mayor Delia R. Donne. In 2014, she was a panelist at the Northeast Connecticut WOW! Forum, alongside Gayle King.

She was subsequently re-elected in 2017, strongly defeating her only challenger, the Reverend Peter Aduba. During her second term, she updated the town's housing anti-discrimination policy to be compliant with the 1964 Civil Rights Act.

Carbone is a member of the Republican Party.

=== Electoral history ===
Torrington Mayoral Election, 2013
Party	Candidate	Votes	%
Republican	Elinor Carbone	4,527	69.77%
Democratic	George Craig	1,755	27.05%
Petitioning Candidate	Giulio Romano	116	1.79%
Write-in	Jacque Williams	90	1.39%
Total votes		6,488	100.00%

Torrington Mayoral Election, 2017
Party	Candidate	Votes	%
Republican	Elinor Carbone	4,726	89.10%
Petitioning Candidate	Peter Aduba	578	10.90%
Total votes		5,304	100.00%

}

Torrington Mayoral Election, 2021
Party	Candidate	Votes	%
Republican	Elinor Carbone	4,015	60.02%
Democratic	Stephen Ivain	2,674	39.98%
Total votes		6,689	100.00%
