= 1934 All-Big Six Conference football team =

The 1934 All-Big Six Conference football team consists of American football players chosen by various organizations for All-Big Six Conference teams for the 1934 college football season. The selectors for the 1934 season included the Associated Press (AP) and the United Press (UP).

== All-Big Six selections ==
=== Backs ===
- Lloyd Cardwell, Nebraska (AP-1 [HB]; UP-1)
- Oren Stoner, Kansas State (AP-1 [HB]; UP-1)
- Henry Bauer, Nebraska (AP-1 [QB]; UP-2)
- Ben Poynor, Oklahoma (AP-1 [FB])
- Leo Ayers, Kansas State (UP-1)
- Glenn Skewes, Nebraska (UP-1)
- Beede Long, Oklahoma (UP-2)
- Maurice Elder, Kansas State (UP-2)
- Bill Allender, Iowa State (UP-2)

=== Ends ===
- Bernie Scherer, Nebraska (AP-1; UP-1)
- Fred Poole, Iowa State (AP-1; UP-1)
- Ralph Churchill, Kansas State (UP-2)
- Jack Harris, Oklahoma (UP-2)

=== Tackles ===
- George Maddox, Kansas State (AP-1; UP-1)
- Milo Clawson, Kansas (AP-1; UP-2)
- Cash Gentry, Oklahoma (UP-1)
- Ed Schafroth, Iowa State (UP-2)

=== Guards ===
- Red Stacy, Oklahoma (AP-1; UP-1)
- Dick Sklar, Kansas (AP-1; UP-1)
- Ike Hays, Iowa State (UP-2)
- Glenn Justice, Nebraska (UP-2)

=== Centers ===
- Franklin Meier, Nebraska (AP-1; UP-1)
- Dan Caldwell, Missouri (UP-2)

== Key ==
- AP = Associated Press
- UP = United Press

== See also ==
- 1934 College Football All-America Team
