= Bill Wallace (American football) =

American football player (1912–1993)

No. 44
- Position: Halfback
- Class: 1936

Personal information
- Born: July 21, 1912; El Campo, Texas, U.S.
- Died: May 17, 1993 (aged 80); Houston, Texas, U.S.
- Listed height: 6 ft 0 in (1.83 m)
- Listed weight: 185 lb (84 kg)

Career information
- High school: Eagle Lake (TX)
- College: Rice (1932, 1934–1935)

Awards and highlights
- First-team All-American (1934); Third-team All-American (1935); 2× First-team All-SWC (1934, 1935); Texas Sports Hall of Fame (1978)
- College Football Hall of Fame (Class of 1978)

Bill Wallace (July 21, 1912 – May 17, 1993) was an American football halfback at Rice Institute in 1932, 1934, and 1935. He was a first-team All-American in 1934 and has been inducted into the College Football Hall of Fame, the Texas Sports Hall of Fame, and the Rice Athletics Hall of Fame.

== Early life ==
Wallace was born in 1912 in El Campo, Texas. He attended Eagle Lake High School in Eagle Lake, Texas. He competed in both track and football at Eagle Lake and was later inducted into the Texas High School Football Hall of Fame.

== Rice Institute ==
Wallace then enrolled at Rice Institute (now Rice University) where he competed in football as a halfback and in track as a sprinter and hurdler. He won the Southwest Conference championship in the 222-yard low hurdles and lost the event at the nationals to Jesse Owens and Glenn Hardin.

In football, Wallace played on both offense and defense. As a sophomore, Wallace starred at halfback for the 1932 Rice Owls football team. In February 1933, he was suspended along with seven other Rice football players on charges of violating school rules in connection with midyear examinations.

Wallace missed the 1933 season due to the suspension but returned in 1934 and led the 1934 Rice Owls football team to a 9–1–1 record and the school's first Southwest Conference football championship. He was selected as a first-team halfback by the Associated Press and Grantland Rice for Collier's Weekly on the 1934 All-America college football team. He was the first back from a Texas school to receive first-team honors on a Collier's All-American.

As a senior, Wallace helped Rice to an 8–3 record, but his performance was not at the same level he reached in 1934. He thumbed his nose at opposing players from George Washington, leading one Texas columnist to question whether success had made Wallace "chesty". At the end of the season, he received first-team honors from the AP on the 1935 All-Southwest Conference football team.

== Later life ==
Wallace was selected in the fourth round (28th overall pick) of the 1936 NFL draft, but he did not play in the NFL.

Wallace left Rice in April 1936 to accept a job with an oil company in Shreveport, Louisiana. He returned to Rice as an assistant football from 1937 to 1944. He later went into business and lived in Gainesville, Georgia.

Wallace was inducted in 1978 into the Rice Athletic Hall of Fame and in 1978 into both the College Football Hall of Fame and the Texas Sports Hall of Fame. He died in 1993 at age 80.
