= 1934 All-Southwest Conference football team =

American college football all-star team

The 1934 All-Southwest Conference football team consists of American football players chosen by various organizations for All-Southwest Conference teams for the 1934 college football season. The selectors for the 1934 season included the Associated Press (AP). The AP picked its team based on a consensus vote of 20 Texas sports writers.

The 1934 Rice Owls football team won the conference championship with a 9–1–1 record and placed four players on the first team.

== All Southwest selections ==
=== Backs ===
- John McCauley, Rice (AP-1 [QB])
- Bohn Hilliard, Texas (AP-1 [HB])
- Bill Wallace, Rice (AP-1 [HB])
- Harry Shuford, SMU (AP-1 [FB])

=== Ends ===
- John Sylvester, Rice (AP-1)
- Phil Sanger, Texas (AP-1)

=== Tackles ===
- W. R. Benton, Arkansas (AP-1)
- Ralph Miller, Rice (AP-1)

=== Guards ===
- Billy Spivey, Arkansas (AP-1)
- J. C. Wetsel, SMU (AP-1)

=== Centers ===
- Darrell Lester, TCU (AP-1)

== Key ==
AP = Associated Press

== See also ==
- 1934 College Football All-America Team
