= 1933 All-Big Six Conference football team =

The 1933 All-Big Six Conference football team consists of American football players chosen by various organizations for All-Big Six Conference teams for the 1933 college football season. The selectors for the 1933 season included the Associated Press (AP).

== All-Big Six selections ==
=== Backs ===
- Bob Dunlap, Oklahoma (AP-1 [QB])
- Doug Russell, Kansas State (AP-1 [HB])
- Ralph Graham, Kansas State (AP-1 [HB])
- George Sauer, Nebraska (AP-1 [FB])
- Bernie Masterson, Nebraska (AP-2)
- Hubert Boswell, Nebraska (AP-2)
- Lee Morgan, Kansas State (AP-2)
- Ormond Beach, Kansas (AP-2)

=== Ends ===
- Bruce Kilbourne, Nebraska (AP-1)
- Lee Penney, Nebraska (AP-1)
- Ernest Casini, Kansas (AP-2)
- John Harris, Oklahoma (AP-2)

=== Tackles ===
- Gail O'Brien, Nebraska (AP-1)
- Cash Gentry, Oklahoma (AP-1)
- Buster Maddox, Kansas State (AP-2)
- Peter Mehringer, Kansas (AP-2)

=== Guards ===
- Warren Debus, Nebraska (AP-1)
- Ellis Bashara, Oklahoma (AP-1)
- Clair Bishop, Nebraska (AP-2)
- Red Stacy, Oklahoma (AP-2)

=== Centers ===
- Franklin Meier, Nebraska (AP-1)
- Harold Fleetwood, Oklahoma (AP-2)

== Key ==
AP = Associated Press

== See also ==
- 1933 College Football All-America Team
