= J. C. Wetsel =

American football player (1910–1980)

No. 40
- Position: Guard

Personal information
- Born: March 17, 1910; Dallas, Texas, U.S.
- Died: November 5, 1980 (aged 70); Fort Worth, Texas, U.S.
- Listed height: 6 ft 1 in (1.85 m)
- Listed weight: 195 lb (88 kg)

Career information
- High school: Peacock Military
- College: Paris Junior (1931–1932); Southern Methodist (1934–1935)

Awards and highlights
- Consensus All-American (1935); 2× First-team All-SWC (1934, 1935)

Jesse Claude "Iron Man" Wetsel (March 17, 1910 – November 5, 1980) was an American college football player for the SMU Mustangs football team of Southern Methodist University in the 1930s. He was a consensus All-American at the guard position in 1935.

== Early life ==
Jesse Claude Wetsel was born March 17, 1910, raised in Dallas, Texas, and died November 5, 1980, in Fort Worth, Texas. His parents were Jess Wetsel and Mattie Brooks. He attended North Dallas High School where he did not play football. He later attended the Peacock Military Academy where he played one year of football. After graduating, Wetsel enrolled at Paris Junior College in Paris, Texas. He was named an all-conference tackle while playing for Paris in 1931.

== SMU ==
Wetsel then played for the SMU Mustangs. He became known by the nickname "Iron Man" because of his ability to play every minute of every game. One newspaper in 1933 wrote: "You probably can guess why Wetsel got that 'Iron Man' moniker. That baby is a guard who thinks that unless he plays the whole schedule without a time out the season is a failure." In 1934, Wetsel was selected as a first-team All-Southwest Conference guard. The newspaper story announcing the honor noted, "For guards, Ironman Wetsel, of Southern Methodist, stands head and shoulders above any other lineman in this section ... Wetsel has everything a champion should have."

As a senior in 1935, Wetsel was a co-captain of the 1935 SMU Mustangs football team that played Stanford in the 1936 Rose Bowl. At the conclusion of the 1935 college football season, Westsel was selected as a first-team All-American by the North American Newspaper Alliance (chosen by Andy Kerr of Colgate, Dan McGugin of Vanderbilt, James Phelan of Washington, and Gus Dorais of Detroit), the All-America Board (a board made up of Glenn "Pop" Warner, Christy Walsh, Elmer Layden, Howard Jones and Frank Thomas) and the Walter Camp Football Foundation. He was also named a consensus first-team All-American based on a survey of the major All-America selectors in 1935. After Wetsel made the All-American team, his junior college coach called him "the most conscientious trainer and hard worker that I have ever coached." The former coach further noted that Wetsel "possessed all the aggressive roughness necessary for a great lineman. Sometimes I feared he would carry his work to excess. As an example he worked out with bar bells daily and in addition he would take an extra mile around the track each day as a conditioner. I think his work with bar bells accounts for his tremendous strength in wrists, arms and shoulders."

== Coaching career ==
Wetsel was drafted by the Green Bay Packers in the first National Football League college draft in 1936, but he never played in the professional league because of his knee condition.

Wetsel was pulled from the 1936 Rose Bowl game due to recurrence of a knee injury. He was forced to undergo surgery the following month to remove a blood clot and adjust a ligament. After graduating, Wetsel became an assistant football coach at Vanderbilt University, and later the line coach at Southern Methodist University. With the U.S. entry into World War II, Wetsel sought to enlist in the U.S. Army in 1943. Newspapers reported the ironic twist when the 34-year-old "Iron Man" Wetsel "failed to pass his final physical examination for induction into the army."

== See also ==
- 1935 College Football All-America Team
