= Charles Ceppi =

American football player (1911–1983)

Princeton Tigers
- Position: Tackle

Personal information
- Born: May 8, 1911; New York, U.S.
- Died: January 13, 1983 (age 71); Palm Beach County, California, U.S.

Career information
- College: Princeton (1933)

Awards and highlights
- First-team All-American (1933); First-team All-Eastern (1933)

Charles Barrus Ceppi (May 8, 1911 – January 13, 1983) was an American football player. He attended Princeton University and played college football for the Princeton Tigers, including Fritz Crisler's undefeated 1933 team that has been recognized as a national co-champion. Ceppi was selected by multiple organizations, including the Football Writers Association of America, the International News Service, Liberty magazine, the North American Newspaper Alliance, and the Central Press Association, as a first-team tackle on the 1933 College Football All-America Team. He later became a physician with a practice in Rhode Island. He sustained a stroke in 1976 and died in 1983.
