= Torrington High School =

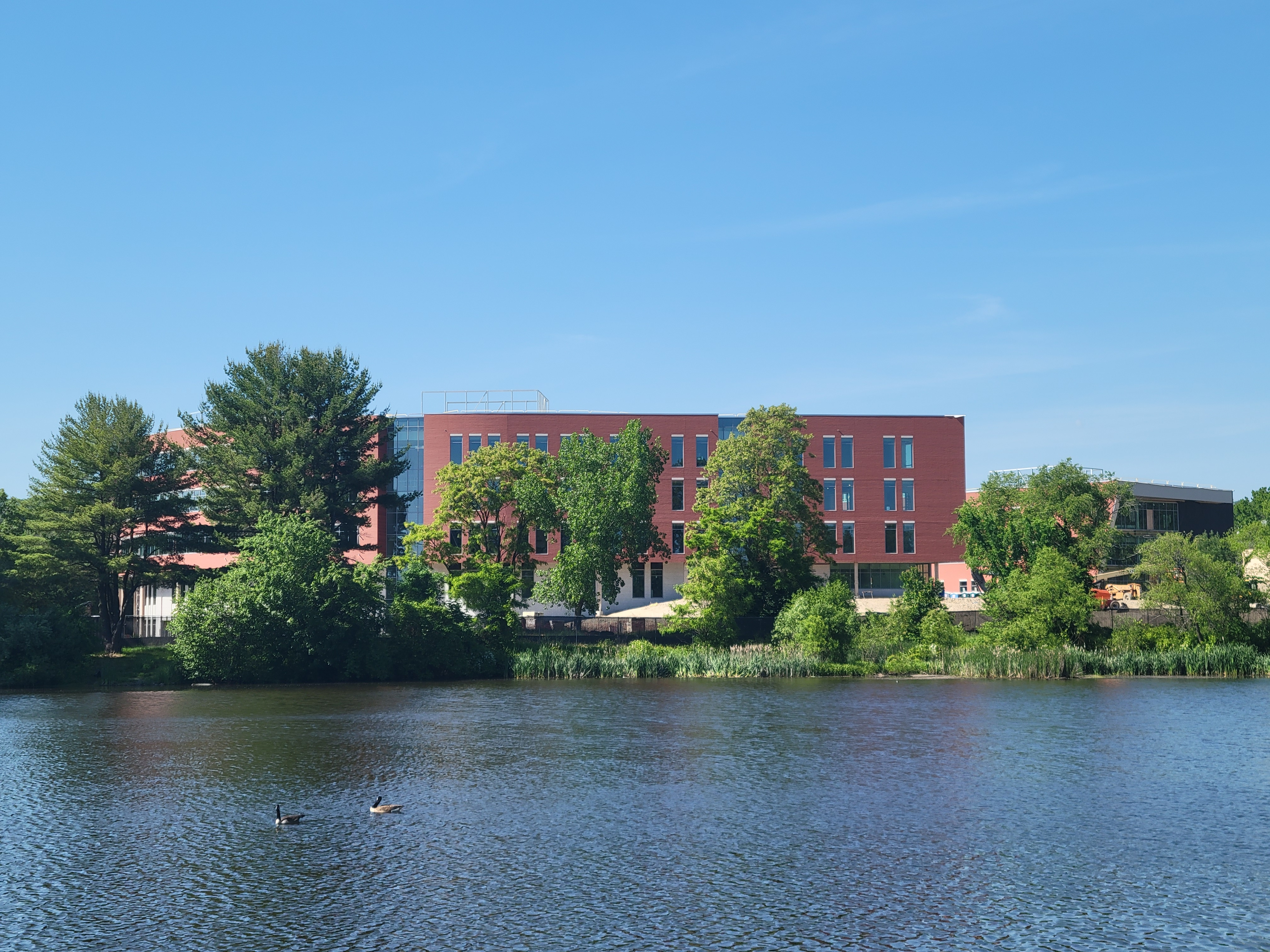
- New Torrington Middle and High School

Location
- 50 Major Besse Drive; Torrington, Connecticut 06790; United States
- Coordinates: 41°48′59″N 73°06′40″W

Information
- Type: Public Secondary
- Motto: "Quod Facis Bene Fac" What(ever) you do, do (it) well
- CEEB code: 070795
- Teaching staff: 86.60 (FTE)
- Enrollment: 1,012 (2023-2024)
- Student to teacher ratio: 11.69
- Colors: Maroon and White
- Website: torringtonths.ss16.sharpschool.com

Torrington High School is the lone public high school in the city of Torrington, Connecticut, United States. The current high school building opened in 1963 and was renovated in 2000.

== Community ==
Torrington is the commercial, industrial, and financial center of Northwestern Connecticut. It is the largest city in Litchfield County with a population of 36,383 in 2017. Torrington High School is a four-year comprehensive high school serving students with varying backgrounds and interests through a range of programs and co-curricular activities. As of the 2018-2019 school year, the Torrington School District consists of four elementary schools, one middle school, and one high school. Torrington High School is accredited by the New England Association of Schools and Colleges.

== Athletics ==
Wins in CIAC State Championships
Sport	Class	Year(s)
Baseball	N/A	1939
Baseball	L	1975
Basketball (boys)	A	1925
Basketball (boys)	L	1944
Basketball (boys)	II	2006

== Notable alumni ==
- Joe Dugan, former MLB player
- Jordan Williams, University of Maryland Terrapins men's basketball team
- Naveen Selvadurai, co-founder of location-based social networking site Foursquare.com
- John A. Speziale, first Italian-American chief justice of the Connecticut Supreme Court
- Elinor Carbone, mayor of Torrington
- Patricia Wald, the first woman appointed to and to serve as the Chief Judge of the U.S. Court of Appeals, who later served on the International Criminal Tribunal in The Hague. In 2013, President Barack Obama awarded her the Presidential Medal of Freedom, the nation’s highest civilian honor.
- Rebecca Podos, author and literary agent

== Gallery ==
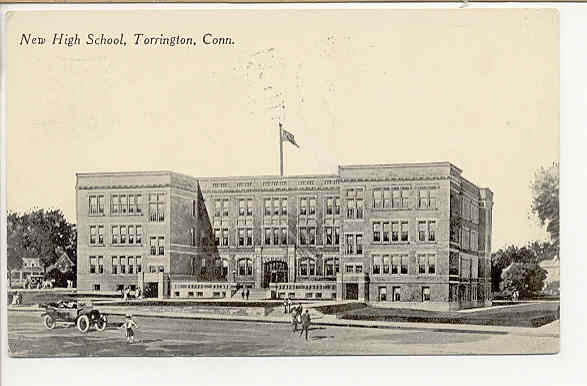
"New" building, about 1915

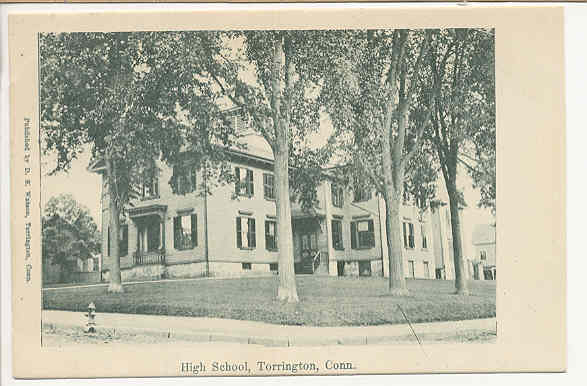
High school about 1905
