= Harvey Jablonsky =

American football player and US Army veteran (1909–1989)

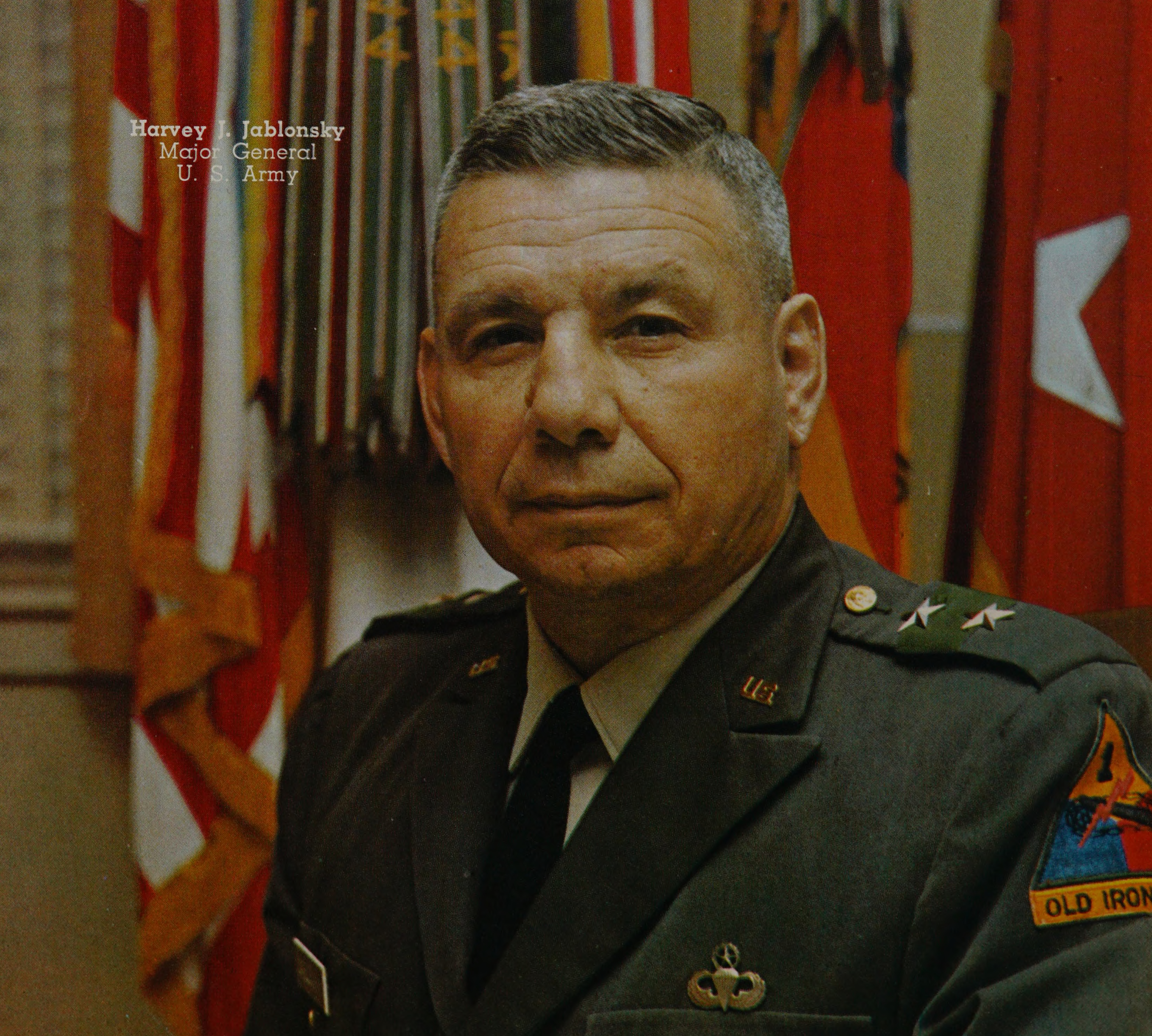
- Jablonsky as 1st Armored Division commander c. 1965

Biographical details
- Born: January 10, 1909; Clayton, Missouri, U.S.
- Died: April 4, 1989 (aged 80); San Antonio, Texas, U.S.
- Education: Washington University in St. Louis (1930); United States Military Academy (1934)

Playing career
- 1927–1929: Washington University
- 1931–1933: Army
- Position: Guard

Coaching career (HC unless noted)
- 1934–1942, 1946: Army (assistant)

Accomplishments and honors

Awards
- Second-team All-American (1933); First-team All-Eastern (1933); Army Athletic Association Trophy (1934); Legion of Merit (1965); Army Distinguished Service Medal (1968); MVC All-Centennial Team (2006)
- College Football Hall of Fame; Inducted in 1978 (profile)

Harvey Julius "Jabo" Jablonsky (January 10, 1909 – April 4, 1989) was a United States Army major general, business executive and American football player. He served in World War II, the Korean War and the Vietnam War. He was also elected to the College Football Hall of Fame in 1978.

== Early life ==
Jablonsky was born January 10, 1909, in Missouri, US, to mother Eugenia from England, and father Arthur from Germany. His parents did not have their own home; instead they lived along with Arthur's parents (Jablonsky's grandparents) in their home in St. Louis County. Missouri.

In 1927, Jablonsky attended Washington University in St. Louis, and in 1929 he was made captain of the football team. He was also on the College Football All-America Team. In addition to football, Jablonsky lettered in three other major sports. He was a member of the men's basketball team which won the Missouri Valley Championship in the 1928–1929 season.

Jablonsky as a West Point cadet

After graduating from Washington University in June 1930 with a B.S. degree in business and public administration, he enrolled in the United States Military Academy at West Point, New York, where he continued to play football as a guard from 1931 to 1933, and became Army's captain in 1933; that year Army had a record of 9-1 and outscored its opponents 227–26. He graduated from the academy in June 1934 with a second B.S. degree, but then remained at West Point as an assistant coach for nine years.

Jablonsky was also married to his first wife Dorothy Jablonsky during these years, and the 1940 census shows he has had his first children, daughter Jean, born 1937 in Virginia, and son David Jablonsky, born 1939 in Panama.

== Military career ==
In 1943, Jablonsky graduated from the Command and General Staff School at Fort Leavenworth, Kansas. On May 31, 1943, he was promoted to the rank of lieutenant colonel and appointed executive officer of 515th Parachute Infantry Regiment ("Jumping Wolves") at Fort Benning, Georgia. He remained the executive officer until November 1943, when the 515th PIR moved to Camp Mackall, North Carolina. On March 7, 1944, the "Jumping Wolves" became a part of the 13th Airborne Division at Camp Mackall. On January 25, 1945, the 13th Airborne Division received their overseas orders and embarked for Europe. They arrived at Le Havre, France, on February 8. On February 12 or 13, Colonel Harvey J Jablonsky, (who had already been deployed to France) assumed command of the "Jumping Wolves".

Although the unit did prepare for combat in Operation Comet (or Operation Market Garden), the strength of the Allied forces continually negated the need for airborne operations. Redeployment began on July 18, 1945, for the fighting in the Pacific, but by the time the unit reached New York, the war in the Pacific was over. The 515th Parachute Infantry Regiment was deactivated at Fort Bragg, North Carolina, on February 25, 1946.

In 1946, Jablonsky returned to West Point to serve as assistant coach.

Jablonsky is listed as a commander of the 187th Infantry Regiment from July 1948 to June 1950. In February and March 1950, he participated in Exercise Swarmer, the largest peacetime airborne maneuvers ever conducted. The 187th airborne received the highest performance scores in this exercise, which was directly related to their being chosen to deploy to Korea as an airborne regimental combat team. ("...credit for the superior performance of the Regiment must go to its commander at that time ... Lieutenant Colonel Harvey J. Jablonsky.") In September 1950, elements of the 187th were attached to the 1st Marine Division to participate in the amphibious landings at Inchon. Jablonsky served on the Joint Airborne Troop Board.

Jablonsky entered the United States Army War College in 1951, graduating in 1952. From 1961 to 1963, he served at the Pentagon. During that time, Jablonsky led a fact-finding mission to Vietnam and, after returning, reported his observations directly to President John F. Kennedy. He commanded the 1st Armored Division at Fort Hood, Texas, during 1963. From November 1963 to January 1964, Jablonsky was acting commander of III Corps.

Jablonsky was sent to Tehran, Iran during 1964–1965, and he became chief military adviser from 1965 to 1968. As chief military adviser, Major General Jablonsky's position was "Chief, ARMISH/MAAG, Tehran, August 1965–July 1968". Jablonsky retired from service in 1968 in Killeen, Texas, where he had previously served as the commanding general of the 1st Armored Division.

For his actions in the Vietnam War, Jablonsky was awarded the Legion of Merit (for the period May 1963-February 1965) on August 13, 1965, and the Army Distinguished Service Medal (for the period August 1965-July 1968) on August 22, 1968.

== Later life and death ==
Jablonsky went on to become vice president of the Northrop Corporation, where he furthered his career within the private defense sector. He was sent back to Iran in 1970 by Northrop to work on an "advanced $225 million telecommunications system".

Jablonsky died of congestive heart failure on April 4, 1989, at the Nursing Center of the Army Residence in San Antonio, Texas. He was aged 80 and was survived by his wife Virgie (died November 3, 2012), three daughters, son Colonel David Jablonsky and a stepson. He was interred at Arlington National Cemetery on April 10, 1989.
