= Darrell Lester (center) =

American football player (1914–1993)

No. 22, 29
- Position: Center

Personal information
- Born: April 29, 1914; Jacksboro, Texas, U.S.
- Died: July 30, 1993 (aged 79); Temple, Texas, U.S.
- Listed height: 6 ft 4 in (1.93 m)
- Listed weight: 220 lb (100 kg)

Career information
- High school: Jacksboro
- College: TCU (1932-1935)
- NFL draft: 1936: 5th round, 43rd overall pick

Career history
- Green Bay Packers (1937–1938)

Awards and highlights
- 2× Consensus All-American (1934, 1935); 2× First-team All-SWC (1934, 1935)

Career NFL statistics
- Games played: 16
- Stats at Pro Football Reference
- College Football Hall of Fame

Darrell George Lester (April 29, 1914 – July 30, 1993) was an American professional football player who was a center for the Green Bay Packers of the National Football League (NFL). He was a two-time All-American playing college football for the TCU Horned Frogs in the 1930s.

A native of Jacksboro, Texas, Lester was not only a great football player at Texas Christian University. He earned nine varsity letters in all, also playing center on the Horned Frogs' basketball team and pitching for their baseball team.

It was football, though, where Lester made his mark. He was the first player in Southwest Conference history to be named consensus All-American twice, earning that honor in both 1934 and 1935. He is the only Horned Frog to be named a two-time consensus All-American. He was a captain on the 1935 team, and along with Sammy Baugh led the Frogs to a 12–1 record and a Sugar Bowl victory over LSU. His successor at center for TCU was Ki Aldrich, who was himself a two-time All-American.

Lester was selected by the Green Bay Packers and played for them for two seasons before retiring due to an injury. After football, Lester served in the U.S. Army Air Corps in World War II. In the postwar period, he worked for General Mills and was one of the founders of the Bluebonnet Bowl in Houston. He retired to Temple, Texas. He was elected to the Texas Sports Hall of Fame in 1978 and he was elected to the College Football Hall of Fame in 1988. He died in 1993.
