= George Rado =

American football player (1912–1992)

No. 13, 5, 27
- Positions: Guard, Defensive end

Personal information
- Born: October 24, 1912; Youngstown, Ohio, U.S.
- Died: April 30, 1992 (aged 79); New Cumberland, West Virginia, U.S
- Listed height: 5 ft 9 in (1.75 m)
- Listed weight: 194 lb (88 kg)

Career information
- High school: Brookfield (Brookfield, Ohio)
- College: Duquesne (1931–1934)

Career history

Playing
- Pittsburgh Pirates (1935–1937); Philadelphia Eagles (1937–1938)

Coaching
- Duquesne (1939–1941); Pittsburgh Steelers (1941)

Awards and highlights
- First-team All-Eastern (1933)

Career statistics
- Games played: 43
- Games started: 21
- Fumble recoveries: 2
- Stats at Pro Football Reference

George "Bullet" Joseph Rado (October 24, 1912 – April 30, 1992) was an American professional football player who was a guard and defensive end for the Pittsburgh Pirates and Philadelphia Eagles of the National Football League (NFL). He played college football for the Duquesne Dukes. Rado was also nicknamed "Mouse" by his teammates due to his short stature.

== Early life ==
Rado was born on October 24, 1912, in Youngstown, Ohio. He attended Brookfield High School in Brooksfield, Ohio from 1929 to 1931. Rado played football as a lineman and "one of the school's greatest players". He was later inducted into the Trumbull County Sports Hall of Fame.

== College career ==
Rado played college football for the Duquesne Dukes from 1931 to 1934. He was chosen by the Associated Press (AP) as a first-team player on the 1933 All-Eastern football team. Rado was inducted into the Duquesne Hall of Fame in 1988.

== Professional career ==
=== Pittsburgh Pirates ===
On August 15, 1935, Rado signed with the Pittsburgh Pirates of the National Football League (NFL). In his rookie season he played in 11 games and started in eight. Rado had a fumble recovery against the Boston Redskins which set up the winning score.

Rado's second season in 1936, would be his best, appearing in 12 games and starting six of them at guard. On November 1, in a game against the Brooklyn Dodgers, he was involved in a fight with John Yezerski, after tackling his teammate, Phil Sarboe. Yezerski left the sidelines and "tangled" with Rado, which was eventually broken up by their teammates. He earned first-team All-Pro honors from Collyer's Eye and second-team from the Chicago Daily News.

On September 8, 1937, Rado was traded to the Philadelphia Eagles for a player to be named later.

=== Philadelphia Eagles ===
After being traded, Rado dressed in nine games and started in one at right guard for the Philadelphia Eagles. 1938 would be his final season where he played in ten games at right guard and started in six of them. On October 26, against the Chicago Cardinals, Rado recovered a fumble to set up the winning and only score from a pass by David Smukler to Joe Carter. He became a free agent at the end of the season.

== Coaching career ==
Following his playing career, Rado volunteered as an assistant coach for the linemen on the Duquesne Dukes football team in 1939, and retained this position for 1940. In 1941, when Duquesne head coach Aldo "Buff" Donelli took the Pittsburgh Steelers job, Donelli brought Rado on the team with him. He was also working as a scout for the Dukes that same year.

== Military career ==
Rado served in the United States Army in World War II as a technical sergeant. He enlisted with fellow Duquesne football coaches, Ted Todd, Lou Skender, Steve Sinko, Jim Cessillo and head coach Aldo "Buff" Donelli. On December 15, 1942, Rado left Duquesne to serve in the Army, training at Fort Meade. In 1944, he was a member of the 99th Military Police platoon.
