= Jordan Williams (basketball, born 1990) =

American basketball player (born 1990)

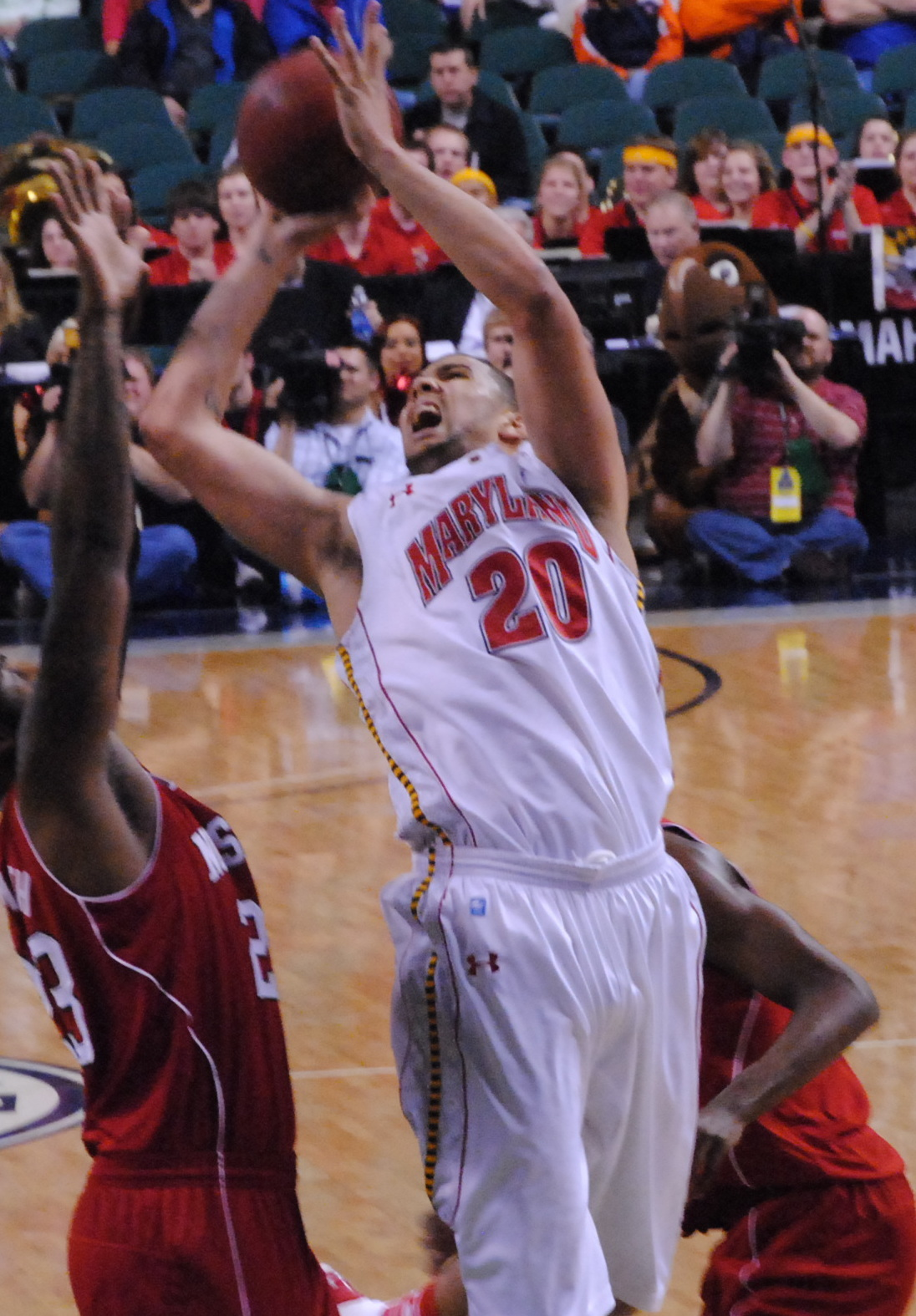
- Williams playing for Maryland in 2011

Personal information
- Born: October 11, 1990 (age 36) Torrington, Connecticut, U.S.
- Listed height: 6 ft 10 in (2.08 m)
- Listed weight: 260 lb (118 kg)

Career information
- High school: Torrington (Torrington, Connecticut)
- College: Maryland (2009–2011)
- NBA draft: 2011: 2nd round, 36th overall pick
- Drafted by: New Jersey Nets
- Playing career: 2011–2018
- Position: Power forward / center
- Number: 20

Career history
- 2011–2012: New Jersey Nets
- 2012: →Springfield Armor
- 2018: CSU Sibiu

Career highlights
- First-team All-ACC (2011)
- Stats at NBA.com
- Stats at Basketball Reference

Jordan Williams (born October 11, 1990) is an American former professional basketball player. He played two seasons of college basketball for the Maryland Terrapins.

== High school career ==
Williams played high school basketball for Torrington High School in Torrington, Connecticut. He averaged 36 points a game as a senior in high school. Due to questions about the level of his competition, Williams did not receive heavy publicity or recruiting attention in high school.

College recruiting
Name	Hometown	School	Height	Weight	Commit date
Jordan Williams; PF/C	Torrington, CT	Torrington HS	6 ft 8 in (2.03 m)	245 lb (111 kg)	Oct 21, 2008
Jordan Williams; PF/C	Recruit ratings: Scout: Rivals: (89)				
Overall recruit ranking:
Note: In many cases, Scout, Rivals, 247Sports, On3, and ESPN may conflict in their listings of height and weight.; In these cases, the average was taken. ESPN grades are on a 100-point scale.; Sources: "Maryland Basketball Commitments". Rivals.; "2009 Maryland Basketball Commits". Scout.; "ESPN". ESPN.; "Scout.com Team Recruiting Rankings". Scout.; "2009 Team Ranking". Rivals.

== College career ==
Williams committed to Maryland on October 21, 2008.

=== Freshman ===
Williams started 31 games as a freshman for the 2009–10 Maryland Terrapins men's basketball team. He was an All-ACC rookie team selection. Williams finished second in rebounding in the ACC. Maryland coach Gary Williams complimented Williams' growth as a player as the season progressed.

=== Sophomore ===
Before his sophomore season, Williams was named to the preseason watch list for the Wooden Award and Naismith Award watchlists. In a January 22, 2011 victory over Clemson, Williams recorded his thirteenth straight Double-double, which set a Maryland record. He broke a streak previously held by Len Elmore. He was picked to the Third Team All-America by Fox Sports.

After the season, Williams submitted his name to the NBA draft. Initially, he did not sign with an agent, which left open the possibility of staying in college. He later hired an agent, which precluded a return to collegiate basketball.

== Professional career ==
On June 23, 2011, the New Jersey Nets drafted Williams with the 36th overall pick in the 2011 NBA draft. During the 2011 NBA lockout, he agreed to play for the Polish team Zastal Zielona Góra. However, the lockout ended before he played a game for them.

Williams was assigned to the Springfield Armor in January 2012. Later that month, Williams was recalled by the Nets.

On July 11, 2012, the Nets traded Williams, Johan Petro, Jordan Farmar, Anthony Morrow, and Deshawn Stevenson to the Atlanta Hawks for Joe Johnson. The Hawks requested waivers on Williams on September 17, 2012.

On August 28, 2013, he signed a one-year deal with Bilbao Basket. However, on September 8, he parted ways with the club.

== NBA career statistics ==
Legend
GP	Games played	GS	Games started	MPG	Minutes per game
FG%	Field goal percentage	3P%	3-point field goal percentage	FT%	Free throw percentage
RPG	Rebounds per game	APG	Assists per game	SPG	Steals per game
BPG	Blocks per game	PPG	Points per game	**Bold**	Career high

=== Regular season ===
Year	Team	GP	GS	MPG	FG%	3P%	FT%	RPG	APG	SPG	BPG	PPG
2011–12	New Jersey	43	5	14.8	.507	.000	.652	3.6	.3	.5	.3	4.6
Career		43	5	14.8	.507	.000	.652	3.6	.3	.5	.3	4.6
