= Jack Robinson (center) =

American football player (1913–1971)

- 1935 Wheaties box with Robinson photograph

Profile
- Position: Center

Personal information
- Born: April 20, 1913; Huntington, Long Island, New York, U.S.
- Died: December 27, 1971 (aged 58); Garden City, New York, U.S.

Career information
- College: Notre Dame (1932, 1934)

Awards and highlights
- Consensus All-American (1934)

John Joseph Robinson, Jr. (April 20, 1913 – December 27, 1971) was an American football player. A native of Huntington, New York, he played college football at the center position at the University of Notre Dame and was a consensus selection on the 1934 College Football All-America Team. He was the son of New York State Assembly member John J. Robinson.

Robinson was born into an affluent family from Long Island, New York and owned race horses during the time he was at Notre Dame. In his later years, Robinson had his legs amputated due to blood clots. He also had a heart attack in September 1970 and was hospitalized at the Nassau Hospital. He died on December 27, 1971, of another heart attack at his home in Garden City, New York.
