= 1935 All-Southwest Conference football team =

American college football all-star team

The 1935 All-Southwest Conference football team consists of American football players chosen by various organizations for All-Southwest Conference teams for the 1935 college football season. The selectors for the 1935 season included the Associated Press (AP).

== All Southwest selections ==
=== Backs ===
- Sammy Baugh, TCU (AP-1 [QB])
- John McCauley, Rice (AP-1 [HB])
- Bob Wilson, SMU (AP-1 [HB])
- Bill Wallace, Rice (AP-1 [FB])

=== Ends ===
- Walter Roach, TCU (AP-1)
- John Sylvester, Rice (AP-1)

=== Tackles ===
- Truman Spain, SMU (AP-1)
- Maurice Orr, SMU (AP-1)

=== Guards ===
- J. C. Wetsel, SMU (AP-1)
- Tracy Kellow, TCU (AP-1)

=== Centers ===
- Darrell Lester, TCU (AP-1)

== Key ==
AP = Associated Press

== See also ==
- 1935 College Football All-America Team
