= George Shotwell =

American football player

Profile
- Position: Center

Personal information
- Born: 1911 or 1912; Wilkes-Barre, Pennsylvania, U.S.
- Died: January 9, 1981 (aged 69); Keansburg, New Jersey, U.S.
- Listed height: 6 ft 2 in (1.88 m)
- Listed weight: 159 lb (72 kg)

Career information
- High school: Hanover Township (PA)
- College: Pittsburgh (1932–1934)

Awards and highlights
- Consensus All-American (1934); First-team All-Eastern (1934)

George C. Shotwell was an American college football center who played for the Pittsburgh Panthers. He was recognized as a consensus first-team All-American in 1934.

== Early life ==
George C. Shotwell was born in Wilkes-Barre, Pennsylvania. He attended Hanover Township High School.

== College career ==
Shotwell played college football for the Pittsburgh Panthers of the University of Pittsburgh, and was a three-year letterman from 1932 to 1934. He was a consensus first-team All-American at center in 1934, and also led the team in interceptions that season. He earned Associated Press first-team All-Eastern honors as well. Shotwell stood 6'2" and weighed 159 pounds in 1934. He weighed 169 with football gear on. Shotwell played in the 1935 Chicago Charities College All-Star Game at guard. He was known as a "keen diagnostician of plays", with Pittsburgh head coach Jock Sutherland stating "I have never seen his superior in this respect, and only a coach knows how valuable this quality is." Shotwell was a member of the Kappa Sigma and Omicron Delta Kappa fraternities. He graduated from Pittsburgh with bachelor's and master's degrees.

== Later life ==
Shotwell was later head coach of Hazleton High School in Hazleton, Pennsylvania from 1936 to 1937. He was a lieutenant and instructor in the Naval Aviation Training Program. He was also a teacher and football coach at the United States Merchant Marine Academy.

Shotwell died on January 9, 1981, at the Beechview Nursing Home in Keansburg, New Jersey at the age of 69.
