= Joseph Bogdanski =

American judge (1911–1997)

Honorable Joseph Bogdanski

Chief Justice of the Connecticut Supreme Court
- In office 1981 – November 1981

Associate Justice of the Connecticut Supreme Court
- In office 1972–1981

Personal details
- Born: Joseph Walter Bogdanski; November 9 or 12, 1911 New Haven, Connecticut, US
- Died: January 12, 1997 (aged 85) Meriden, Connecticut, US
- Football career

Colgate Raiders
- Position: End

Career information
- College: Colgate

Awards and highlights
- First-team All-American (1934); First-team All-Eastern (1934)

Joseph Walter Bogdanski (November 12, 1911 – January 12, 1997) was an American college football player, lawyer, and judge. He served as an associate justice of the Connecticut Supreme Court from 1972 to 1981, and as chief justice for several months in 1981, and played football at Colgate, earning an All-American selection in 1934.

== Career ==
Born in New Britain, Connecticut, Bogdanski graduated from Vermont Academy in 1931 and received his A.B. from Colgate University in 1935. While at Colgate, he also received various football scholarships and was named an All-American football player. He received an LL.B. from the University of Connecticut School of Law, cum laude, in 1940, and gained admission to the Connecticut bar that same year.

He entered private practice in 1940, and served as prosecuting attorney for the City Court of Meriden, Connecticut, from 1942 to 1943. He then entered in the United States Navy during World War II, remaining in service from 1943 to 1948, and achieved the rank of Lieutenant while serving on a destroyer escort in the Atlantic theater. He was appointed Lieutenant Commander of the military staff of Governor Chester Bowles from 1949 to 1951, also serving during that time as a judge of the City Court of Meriden. He became a judge of the Court of Common Pleas in 1955.

In 1958, Governor Abraham Ribicoff appointed Bogdanski to the Connecticut Superior Court, and in 1972 Bogdanski was elevated to the state supreme court. Following his retirement from the court in 1981, he served as a senior judge in New Haven County, Connecticut, for a decade.

Bogdanski died in Meriden after a short illness at the age of 85.

Political offices
Preceded by Elmer W. Ryan	Justice of the Connecticut Supreme Court; 1972–1981	Succeeded by David M. Shea
