= Izzy Weinstock =

American football player (1913–1997)

No. 10, 47
- Position: Fullback

Personal information
- Born: June 27, 1913; Wilkes-Barre, Pennsylvania, U.S.
- Died: September 26, 1997 (aged 84); Fort Lauderdale, Florida, U.S.
- Listed height: 5 ft 11 in (1.80 m)
- Listed weight: 190 lb (86 kg)

Career information
- High school: Coughlin (Wilkes-Barre)
- College: Pittsburgh

Career history

Playing
- Philadelphia Eagles (1935); Pittsburgh Pirates (1937–1938)

Coaching
- Spokane Air Service (1943) Head coach

Awards and highlights
- First-team All-American (1934); 2× First-team All-Eastern (1933, 1934)
- Stats at Pro Football Reference

Isadore "Izzy" Weinstock (June 27, 1913 – September 26, 1997) was an American professional football player. Weinstock attended James M. Coughlin High School in Wilkes-Barre, Pennsylvania, and the University of Pittsburgh. He played college football for the Pitt Panthers football team from 1932 to 1934 and was selected by the Newspaper Enterprise Association and the North American Newspaper Alliance as a first-team fullback on the 1934 College Football All-America Team. He was also chosen as a second-team All-American by the Associated Press. He also played professional football as a fullback in the National Football League for the Philadelphia Eagles in 1935, and for the Pittsburgh Pirates in 1937 and 1938. Weinstock sustained a broken nose and thereafter became one of the first football players to wear a face mask.

Weinstock served as a lieutenant in the United States Army Air Forces during World War II. He was the head coach and a player for the 1943 Spokane Air Service Commandos football team.

Weinstock died on September 26, 1997, at his home in Fort Lauderdale, Florida, following a long illness.

== Head coaching record ==
| Year | Team | Overall | Conference | Standing | Bowl/playoffs |
|---|---|---|---|---|---|
Spokane Air Service Commandos (Independent) (1943)
| 1943 | Spokane Air Service | 2–2 | | | |
| Spokane Air Service: | | 2–2 | | | |
| Total: | | 2–2 | | | |
