= Ken Ormiston =

American football player and coach (1911–1951)

Biographical details
- Born: September 1, 1911; Pennsylvania, U.S.
- Died: September 2, 1951 (aged 40); London Bridge, Virginia, U.S.

Playing career
- 1932–1934: Pittsburgh
- Position: Guard

Coaching career (HC unless noted)
- 1938: Miami (FL) (freshmen)
- 1941: Western Reserve (assistant)
- 1945: Third Air Force (line)
- 1946–1947: Amherst (line)
- 1948–1950: Pittsburgh Steelers (line)

Accomplishments and honors

Awards
- First-team All-American (1934); First-team All-Eastern (1934)

Kenneth L. Ormiston (September 1, 1911 – September 2, 1951) was an American football player and coach.

Ormiston attended Westinghouse High School in Pittsburgh where he played football, baseball and volleyball. He then enrolled at The Kiski School and then at the University of Pittsburgh where he played college football at the guard position for the Pittsburgh Panthers football team from 1932 to 1934. He was selected by the International News Service and the New York Sun as a first-team guard on the 1934 College Football All-America Team. He was also selected as a second-team All-American by the Associated Press.

After graduating from Pitt, Ormiston began a career in coaching. In 1938, he was the "frosh coach" for the Miami Hurricanes football team. In 1941, he was an assistant coach for the Western Reserve Red Cats football team in Cleveland, present-day Case Western Reserve University. During World War II, Ormiston served as an athletic director and special service officer with the United States Army Air Forces. In 1945, he was the line coach for the Third Air Force Gremlins in Tampa, Florida. In 1946, he was hired as the line coach at Amherst College, a position he held for three years. He also served as the line coach for the Pittsburgh Steelers from 1948 to 1950.

Ormiston retired from coaching after suffering a heart attack and moved to Norfolk, Virginia. He died in Virginia in 1951 at age 42.
