= Red Stacy =

American football player (1912–1998)

- Stacy and Alberta Hunter on their wedding day, January 1936

No. 25
- Position: Tackle / Guard

Personal information
- Born: March 4, 1912; Hollis, Oklahoma, U.S.
- Died: April 23, 1998 (aged 86); Loomis, California, U.S.
- Listed height: 6 ft 2 in (1.88 m)
- Listed weight: 210 lb (95 kg)

Career information
- High school: Altus (OK)
- College: Oklahoma

Career history
- Detroit Lions (1935–1937)

Awards and highlights
- NFL champion (1935); First-team All-Big Six (1934); Second-team All-Big Six (1933)
- Stats at Pro Football Reference

James William "Red" Stacy (March 4, 1912 – April 23, 1998) was an American football player. He played college football at the University of Oklahoma from 1932 to 1934 and professionally for the Detroit Lions of the National Football League (NFL) from 1935 to 1937. During the summer of 1933, Stacy appeared in a motion picture with Charles Bickford. On returning to Oklahoma, he reported that he had gotten the "workout of his life in the film capital. Stacy appeared in a mob scene in which a group of college athletes rescued Bickford from gangsters. Stacy said, "They ran us to death. Finally, at 2 A.M. the director yelled, 'That's all.' We were so tired we dropped Bickford, who was tied hand and foot to a pole, on to the ground and made a bee line for the office to get our pay. Somebody finally untied Bickford." In 1934, Stacy was the only player unanimously selected as a first-team All-Big Six football player. He was also a member of the 1935 Detroit Lions team that won the 1935 NFL Championship Game. In January 1936, weeks after the Lions won the NFL championship, Stacy married Alberta Stewart of Honolulu, Hawaii, in a ceremony at the Hollywood Roosevelt Hotel in Hollywood. Stacy died in April 1998 at age 86.
