= Chuck Hartwig =

American football player (1912–1950)

- Hartwig from 1935 Wheaties box

Pitt Panthers
- Position: Guard

Personal information
- Born: June 1, 1912; Wileyville, West Virginia, U.S.
- Died: September 15, 1950 (aged 38); McMechen, West Virginia, U.S.

Career information
- College: Pittsburgh (1934)

Awards and highlights
- Consensus All-American (1934); First-team All-Eastern (1934)

Chuck Crawford Hartwig (June 1, 1912 – September 15, 1950) was an American college football player. At six feet and 190 pounds, he was a native of West Virginia. He attended the University of Pittsburgh where he played at the guard position for the Pitt Panthers football team. He was a consensus first-team selection on the 1934 College Football All-America Team. He was later an assistant coach for the Panthers.
