= Jim Steen (American football) =

American football player (1913–1983)

James Steen
No. 23
- Position: Tackle

Personal information
- Born: March 28, 1913; New York, New York, U.S.
- Died: November 23, 1983 (aged 70); Detroit, Michigan, U.S.
- Listed height: 6 ft 2 in (1.88 m)
- Listed weight: 205 lb (93 kg)

Career information
- High school: New Rochelle (NY)
- College: Syracuse

Career history
- Detroit Lions (1935–1936)

Awards and highlights
- NFL champion (1935); First-team All-American (1934); First-team All-Eastern (1934)
- Stats at Pro Football Reference

James Steen (March 28, 1913 – November 23, 1983) was an American football player. Steen attended New Rochelle High School and Syracuse University. He played college football for the Syracuse Orange football team and was selected by the United Press, Liberty magazine and the Central Press Association as a first-team tackle on the 1934 College Football All-America Team. He also played professional football in the National Football League (NFL) from 1935 to 1936 for the Detroit Lions.
