= Slade Cutter =

American football player and Naval commander

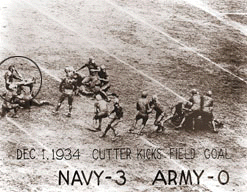
- Cutter wins 1934 Army-Navy Game

No. 15
- Position: Tackle

Personal information
- Born: November 1, 1911; Chicago, Illinois, U.S.
- Died: June 9, 2005 (aged 93); Annapolis, Maryland, U.S.
- Listed height: 6 ft 1 in (1.85 m)
- Listed weight: 215 lb (98 kg)

Career information
- High school: East High School, Aurora, IL; Severn Prep, Annapolis, MD
- College: Navy

Awards and highlights
- First-team All-American (1934)
- College Football Hall of Fame (Class of 1967)

Other information
- Military career
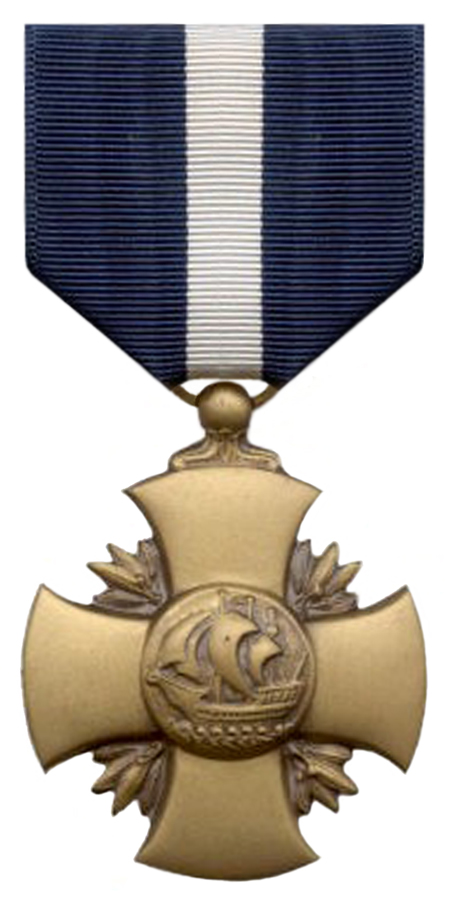
- Allegiance: United States
- Branch: United States Navy
- Service years: 1935–1965
- Rank: Captain
- Commands: USS Seahorse (SS-304); USS Requin (SS-481); Submarine Division 32; Submarine Squadron 6 USS Neosho (AO-143); USS Northampton (CLC-1)
- Conflicts: World War II: U.S. submarine campaign against the Japanese Empire
- Awards: Navy Cross (4); Silver Star (2); Bronze Star Medal; Presidential Unit Citation

Slade Deville Cutter (November 1, 1911 – June 9, 2005) was a career U.S. naval officer who was awarded four Navy Crosses and tied for second place for Japanese ships sunk in World War II. He graduated from the United States Naval Academy as an All-American American football player.

== Naval Academy and early naval career ==
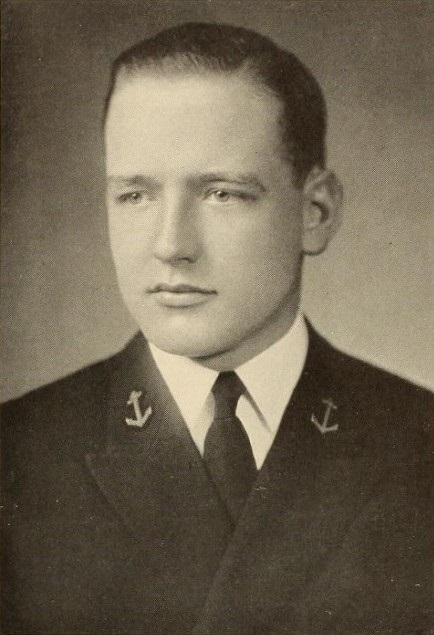
At Annapolis in 1935

Cutter was born in Chicago and raised in Oswego, Illinois. Originally intending to become a professional flutist, he instead went to Severn School, at the time a prep school for aspiring Naval Academy applicants, and was noticed in their athletic program. Not only a football star, Cutter was an intercollegiate boxing champion. "An all-American football player, he achieved instant fame as a first classman when he won the 1934 Army-Navy game with a first-quarter field goal.

On the basis of his Academy football career, he was later inducted into the College Football Hall of Fame. Cutter graduated in 1935, served on the battleship USS Idaho (BB-42), where he coached another winning football team."

== Submarine duty ==
He entered Submarine School in June 1938. By the Attack on Pearl Harbor, he had advanced to executive officer.

=== First wartime assignment ===
Cutter was Executive Officer of USS Pompano (SS-181) under LCDR Lew Parks when she left Pearl Harbor on her first war patrol on 18 December 1941, just 11 days after the Japanese attack. Only two days out of Pearl Harbor, Pompano was sighted by a U.S. patrol plane, which attacked, and called in dive bombers from the nearby USS Enterprise (CV-6). Three additional near-misses ruptured Pompano's fuel tanks and left her trailing an oil slick. Parks shook off his pursuers and pressed on to confirm the presence of Japanese troops on Wake Island. Pompano then continued to the Marshall Islands, where she found a 16,000-ton Japanese transport at Wotje, which was attacked with four torpedoes. Parks remained off Wotje for five more days and eventually attacked a destroyer, but his first two torpedoes detonated early.

After an inevitable depth-charge attack and with fuel draining relentlessly from the oil leak, Pompano returned to home base on 31 January 1942. Unfortunately, postwar analysis credited Parks with no more than possible damage to the Wotje transport.

Cutter made two more war patrols as Executive Officer of Pompano, operating in the vicinity of Okinawa and Honshū, respectively. The boat narrowly escaped destruction on 9 August 1942, when a Japanese depth charge unseated an engine exhaust valve, causing major flooding and driving her into the bottom near the Japanese coast. Fortunately, the crew managed to surface the boat and creep away.

=== USS Seahorse ===
After the third patrol on Pompano, Cutter was assigned as Executive Officer in USS Seahorse (SS-304), then under construction. Initially commanded by CDR Don McGregor, Seahorse took a shakedown cruise, and reached the Pacific in summer 1943.

Seahorse's first war patrol began on 3 August 1943. After the boat returned, Vice Admiral Charles A. Lockwood (Commander, Submarines, Pacific Fleet, COMSUBPAC) relieved McGregor for not being aggressive enough. Cutter was named Commanding Officer of Seahorse in October 1943.

Cutter took his new charge out of Pearl Harbor on 20 October for her second war patrol and his first as Commanding Officer. Heading for the East China Sea, he drew first blood on the 29th, 30th, and 31st, when Seahorse sank three trawlers with gunfire south of Japan." Subsequently, Seahorse, working with USS Trigger (SS-237), coincidentally assigned to the same area, attacked a large convoy detected by USS Halibut (SS-232) the day before. Surprised by the sudden evidence of Trigger's torpedoes, Cutter shot nine of his own and sank two freighters. Entering the East China Sea and bearing for the Korea Strait, Cutter sank two more ships, then returned to Pearl Harbor on 12 December. For this patrol, he claimed four ships (totalling 19,570 tons) sunk, not counting the trawlers. The patrol earned him his first Navy Cross.

His next patrol left Pearl Harbor on 6 January 1944, headed for a patrol area near the Palau Islands, near the Philippines. En route, he sank an escorted freighter. Arriving in the patrol area, he received a message from HYPO, alerting him to a convoy of two freighters and three escorts, which he located visually on 21 January. He sank both freighters.

Seahorse then moved to Palau and on 28 January, Cutter discovered three freighters emerging from the harbor under heavy escort. He tracked the convoy for 32 hours waiting for an opening and at 0200 on the 30th was finally able to put three torpedoes into Toku Maru (2,747 tons). One of these blew the stern off, and she went down directly, taking over 450 troops with her. Harassed by the escorts and accompanying aircraft, Cutter nonetheless kept Seahorse in trail of the remaining Japanese for another 48 hours and attempted another attack just after midnight on 1 February. Eight torpedoes missed. Under heavy pressure from an escort, he shot two last torpedoes from his stern tubes just before going deep. Amid the ensuing depth charge attack, Cutter's men heard both torpedoes hit and the now-familiar sound of exploding gasoline drums. Indeed, it was later confirmed that they had sunk the Japanese steamer Toei Maru (4,004 tons). After this 80-hour chase – nearly a record, Seahorse returned to Pearl Harbor on 16 February with another five ships and 13,716 tons to her credit. The patrol earned Cutter a second Navy Cross.

Seahorse's fourth war patrol took her to the Mariana Islands, specifically to prevent the Japanese from reinforcing Guam and Saipan. She departed Pearl Harbor on 16 March 1944, and near Guam on 8 April came across a Japanese supply convoy, damaging two vessels that subsequently sank. Seahorse moved on, and the very next day found a 15-20 ship convoy that had already been attacked by Trigger as it neared Saipan, sinking another cargo ship.

On lifeguard (aircrew rescue) duty in support of carrier air strikes on Saipan, Seahorse next sighted and sank the Japanese submarine I-174, one of the few submarine attacks on another submarine in World War Two. A week later, Seahorse found another convoy 45 miles west of Saipan and sank another freighter, refueling in New Guinea returning to Brisbane, Australia, on the 11th. The patrol earned Cutter a third Navy Cross.

Accompanying the U.S. invasion of the Marianas in mid-June 1944, Lockwood sent more than a dozen submarines westward to interdict possible Japanese reinforcements. Seahorse departed Brisbane on 3 June for her fifth war patrol and took station with Growler in the Surigao Strait between Mindanao and Leyte 13 June. Seahorse's greatest contribution to the Battle of the Philippine Sea was locating a Japanese battle group centered around the Japanese battleships Yamato and Musashi. In 1997, Cutter told a reporter the task force was too distant to catch, but he sent a routine contact report.

After the battle, Seahorse joined a wolfpack in the Luzon Strait, and sank five more ships. Cutter was awarded a fourth Navy Cross for the patrol.

=== Assigned to new construction ===
After Seahorse's fourth patrol and a rest leave, Cutter was assigned as Commanding Officer of the new-construction USS Requin (SS-481). His wife, Fran, sponsored the ship when she commissioned on 28 April 1945. Requin left Portsmouth for the Pacific theater in early June and arrived at Pearl Harbor at the end of July, but the war ended shortly after she departed on her first war patrol.

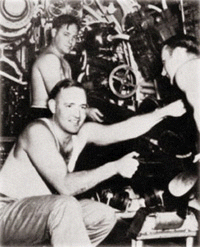
Cutter in an informal torpedo room chat

== World War II summary ==
Summary of CDR Slade D. Cutter's USS Seahorse (SS-304) War Patrols
	Departing From	Date	Days	Wartime Credit Ships/Tonnage	JANAC Credit Ships/Tonnage	Patrol Area
Seahorse-2	Pearl Harbor, TH	October 1943	53	6 / 48,700	5 / 27,579	East China Sea
Seahorse-3	Pearl Harbor, TH	January 1944	41	5 / 30,900	5 / 13,716	Palau
Seahorse-4	Pearl Harbor, TH	March 1944	56	4 / 25,700	5 / 19,375	-->Brisbane
Seahorse-5	Brisbane, Australia	June 1944	47	6 / 37,000	4 / 11,059	-->Pearl Harbor

CDR Cutter's Ranking Compared with Other Top Skippers
Ranking	Number of Patrols	Ships/Tons Credited	Ships/Tons JANAC
2	4	21 / 142,300	19 / 71,729

=== Command style ===
His biographer, Carl Lavo, described Cutter as having an abrasive style with superior officers, which may well have cost him selection for promotion to rear admiral. Especially controversial was his effective challenge to Adm. Hyman Rickover, claiming the first nuclear submarine, USS Nautilus (SSN-571), was "strictly a test vehicle. I doubt if she will ever fire a shot in anger."

== Postwar naval service ==
Postwar, Cutter commanded Submarine Division 32. He attained the rank of captain in July 1954 and subsequently commanded Submarine Squadron 6, the oiler USS Neosho (AO-143) and the command cruiser USS Northampton (CC-1) while she was flagship of the United States Second Fleet. The Northampton was designated as the National Emergency Command Post (Afloat) (NECPA) during this time.

Cutter was named athletic director at the Naval Academy in the late 1950s, in an effort to encourage popular football coach Eddie Erdelatz to resign. Lavo said Erdelatz was running a "professional-style football program" but too few players were opting to remain in the Navy after graduation because of his reputed disparaging of the service. Capt. Cutter's knowledge of the sports program and his feeling Erdelatz was "disloyal to the Navy" led to Erdelatz's departure. Much of the task was helped by Capt. Cutter's stature as an athletic and wartime hero." His final active-duty assignment, in 1965, was as head of the Naval Historical Display Center in Washington.

== Retirement and death ==
Cutter retired from active duty in 1965 and was elected to the College Football Hall of Fame in 1967. He later became headmaster of a boys' school in Tucson, where he moved to care for his first wife's asthma condition. Frances Leffler Cutter died in 1981. After her death, he moved back to Annapolis. In 1982, he married Ruth McCracken Buek.

Cutter died June 9, 2005, at Ginger Cove retirement community in Annapolis at age 93. He had Parkinson's disease. Survivors include his wife of 23 years, Ruth McCracken Buek Cutter of Annapolis; two children from the first marriage, Slade D. Cutter Jr. of Austin and Anne McCarthy of Santa Fe, N.M.; three stepchildren, Scott Buek of Delran, N.J., Harvey Buek of Conshohocken, Pa., and Pamela Sullivan of Sparks, Nev.; a sister; nine grandchildren; and five great-grandchildren. Cutter was interred at the United States Naval Academy Cemetery.

== Memorials ==
A 40-acre athletic field in Hampton Roads, Virginia was dedicated as the Captain Slade Cutter Athletic Park on 14 October 2011. Ruth Cutter (widow) was in attendance to hear the dedication remarks: "They say the name makes a man—and what a name. Slade Cutter—he was destined for greatness."

== Awards and decorations ==

1st Row	Navy Cross with three gold award stars	Silver Star with one gold award star	
2nd Row	Bronze Star with "V" Device	Navy Presidential Unit Citation with one bronze service star	American Defense Service Medal
3rd Row	Asiatic-Pacific Campaign Medal with 11 battle stars	World War II Victory Medal	National Defense Service Medal with star
