= 1934 All-America college football team =

Official list of the best college football players of 1934

The 1934 All-America college football team is composed of college football players who were selected as All-Americans by various organizations and writers that chose All-America college football teams in 1934. The nine selectors recognized by the NCAA as "official" for the 1934 season are (1) Collier's Weekly, as selected by Grantland Rice, (2) the Associated Press (AP), (3) the United Press (UP), (4) the All-America Board (AAB), (5) the International News Service (INS), (6) Liberty magazine, (7) the Newspaper Enterprise Association (NEA), (8) the North American Newspaper Alliance (NANA), and (9) the Sporting News (SN).

No player was the unanimous choice of all nine selectors. Quarterback Bobby Grayson of Stanford and fullback Pug Lund of Minnesota led the group with first-team designations from eight of the nine official selectors. Dixie Howell of Alabama and Chuck Hartwig of Pittsburgh each received six official first-team designations.

== Consensus All-Americans ==
For the year 1934, the NCAA recognizes nine published All-American teams as "official" designations for purposes of its consensus determinations. The following chart identifies the NCAA-recognized consensus All-Americans and displays which first-team designations they received.

Name	Position	School	Number	Official	Other
Bobby Grayson	Quarterback	Stanford	8/9	AAB, AP, COL, INS, NANA, NEA, SN, UP	CP, NYS, WC
Pug Lund	Fullback	Minnesota	8/9	AAB, AP, COL, INS, LIB, NANA, SN, UP	NYS, WC
Chuck Hartwig	Guard	Pittsburgh	6/9	AAB, AP, INS, LIB, NANA, SN	CP, NYS, WC
Dixie Howell	Halfback	Alabama	6/9	AAB, INS, LIB, NANA, NEA, UP	CP, WC
Monk Moscrip	End	Stanford	5/9	AAB, LIB, NEA, SN, UP	CP, WC
Don Hutson	End	Alabama	5/9	AAB, AP, INS, LIB, UP	NYS, WC
Frank Larson	End	Minnesota	5/9	AP, COL, NANA, NEA, SN	CP, NYS
Bill Lee	Tackle	Alabama	5/9	AP, COL, LIB, NANA, SN	--
Bill Bevan	Guard	Minnesota	5/9	COL, LIB, NANA, SN, UP	--
Bob Reynolds	Tackle	Stanford	4/9	AP, COL, INS, NANA	NYS
Buzz Borries	Halfback	Navy	4/9	AP, COL, SN, UP	CP, NYS
Darrell Lester	Center	TCU	2/9	AP, INS	NYS
Jack Robinson	Center	Notre Dame	2/9	AAB, NANA	WC
George Shotwell	Center	Pittsburgh	2/9	COL, UP	CP

== All-American selections for 1934 ==
=== Ends ===
- Don Hutson, Alabama (College and Pro Football Hall of Fame) (AAB; AP-1; COL; INS-1; LIB-1; NANA-2; UP-1; CSW-2; NYS-1; WC-1)
- Frank Larson, Minnesota (AP-1; COL; NANA-1; NEA-1; SN; CP-1; NYS-1)
- Jim Moscrip, Stanford (AAB; AP-2; LIB-1; NANA-2; NEA-1; UP-1; SN; CP-1; WC-1)
- Joseph Bogdanski, Colgate (AP-3; NANA-1)
- Merle Wendt, Ohio State (INS-1)
- Lester Borden, Fordham (AP-2)
- Willis Ward, Michigan (CSW-2)
- Larry Kelley, Yale (AP-3)

=== Tackles ===
- Bill Lee, Alabama (AP-1; COL; LIB-1; NANA-1; SN)
- Bob Reynolds, Stanford (AP-1; COL; INS-1; NANA-1; NYS-1)
- James Steen, Syracuse (AP-2; LIB-1; UP-1; CP-1)
- Slade Cutter, Navy (AP-3; NEA-1; SN)
- George Maddox, Kansas State (College Football Hall of Fame) (AAB; WC-1)
- Clyde Carter, SMU (UP-1)
- Cassius "Cash" Gentry, Oklahoma (NEA-1; CSW-2)
- Ed Widseth, Minnesota (College Football Hall of Fame) (INS-1)
- George Theodoratus, Washington State (NEA-1)
- Joseph Ferrara, Columbia (AP-2)
- Charles Galbreath, Illinois (AP-3)
- Phil Bengtson, Minnesota (NANA-2)
- Charley Hamrick, Ohio State (NANA-2)
- Charles "Buzz" Harvey, Holy Cross (CSW-2)

=== Guards ===
- Chuck Hartwig, Pittsburgh (AAB; AP-1; INS-1; LIB-1; NANA-1; SN; CP-1; NYS-1; WC-1)
- Bill Bevan, Minnesota (AP-2; COL; LIB-1; NANA-1; SN; UP-1)
- Regis Monahan, Ohio State (AAB; AP-2; NEA-1; UP-1; CP-1; NYS-1 [t]; WC-1; CSW-2)
- George T. Barclay, North Carolina (AAB [t]; AP-1; COL; NEA-1; WC-1; CSW-2)
- Charles Mucha, Washington (AP-3; NANA-2)
- Ken Ormiston, Pittsburgh (AP-3; INS-1; NYS-1)
- Jac Weller, Princeton (NANA-2)

=== Centers ===
- Jack Robinson, Notre Dame (AAB; AP-2; NANA-1; CSW-2; WC-1)
- Darrell Lester, TCU (College Football Hall of Fame) (AP-1; INS-1; NYS-1)
- George Shotwell, Pittsburgh (COL; NANA-2; UP-1; CP-1)
- Elmer Ward, Utah State (NEA-1)
- Ellmore Patterson, Chicago (LIB-1)
- Elwood Kalbaugh, Princeton (SN)
- Franklin Meier, Nebraska (AP-3)

=== Quarterbacks ===
- Bobby Grayson, Stanford (College Football Hall of Fame) (AAB [fb]; AP-1; COL; NEA-1; INS-1 [fb]; NANA-1; SN; UP-1; CP-1 [fb]; NYS-1; WC-1)
- Arleigh Williams, California (AP-2; INS-1)
- Ed Goddard, Washington State (LIB-1)
- Miller Munjas, Pittsburgh (AP-3; NANA-2)

=== Halfbacks ===
- Dixie Howell, Alabama (College Football Hall of Fame) (AAB [qb]; AP-2; INS-1; LIB-1; NANA-1; NEA-1; UP-1; CP-1; CSW-2; WC-1)
- Buzz Borries, Navy (College Football Hall of Fame) (AP-1; COL; NANA-2; SN; UP-1; CP-1; NYS-1)
- Bill Wallace, Rice (AP-1; COL)
- Bob "Bones" Hamilton, Stanford (LIB-1)
- Jay Berwanger, Chicago (College Football Hall of Fame) (AAB; AP-2; WC-1)
- Harry Shuford SMU (NEA-1)
- Duane Purvis, Purdue (NANA-2; SN)
- Richard Heekin, Ohio State (AP-3)
- Claude Simons, Jr., Tulane (AP-3)
- Jack Buckler, Army (CSW-2)

=== Fullbacks ===
- Pug Lund, Minnesota (College Football Hall of Fame) (AAB [hb]; AP-1; COL; INS-1 [hb]; LIB-1; NANA-1 [hb]-1; SN; UP-1; NYS-1 [hb]; WC-1)
- Izzy Weinstock, Pittsburgh (AP-2; NANA-1; NEA-1; CSW-2)
- Stan Kostka, Minnesota (NANA-2; NYS-1; CSW-2)
- David Smukler, Temple (AP-3)

== Key ==
Bold = Consensus All-American

- -1 – First-team selection
- -2 – Second-team selection
- -3 – Third-team selection

=== Official selectors ===
- AAB = All-America Board
- AP = Associated Press: "Alan J. Gould, Associated Press general sports editor, selected the Associated Press All-America football team. He was assisted by his staff of writers all over the country, sports editors of member papers, and eading coaches whose co-operation he sought."
- COL = Collier's Weekly as selected by Grantland Rice
- NEA = Newspaper Enterprise Association
- INS = International News Service selected by Davis Walsh
- LIB = Liberty magazine: "Fifteen hundred and forty Intercollegiate players from 93 major universities voted, according to Norman L. Sper who conducted the selection for Liberty"
- NANA = North American Newspaper Alliance, selected "by four famous coaches: Andy Kerr, of Colgate; Dan E. McGugin, of Vanderbilt; James Phelan, of Washington; and Gus Dorais, of Detroit."
- SN = The Sporting News
- UP = United Press

=== Other selectors ===
- CP = Central Press Association
- CSW = College Sports Writers
- NYS = New York Sun
- WC = Walter Camp Football Foundation

== See also ==
- 1935 Little All-America college football team
- 1934 All-Big Six Conference football team
- 1934 All-Big Ten Conference football team
- 1934 All-Pacific Coast Conference football team
- 1934 All-SEC football team
- 1934 All-Southwest Conference football team
