= 1933 Pittsburgh Panthers football team =

American college football season

1933 Pittsburgh Panthers football
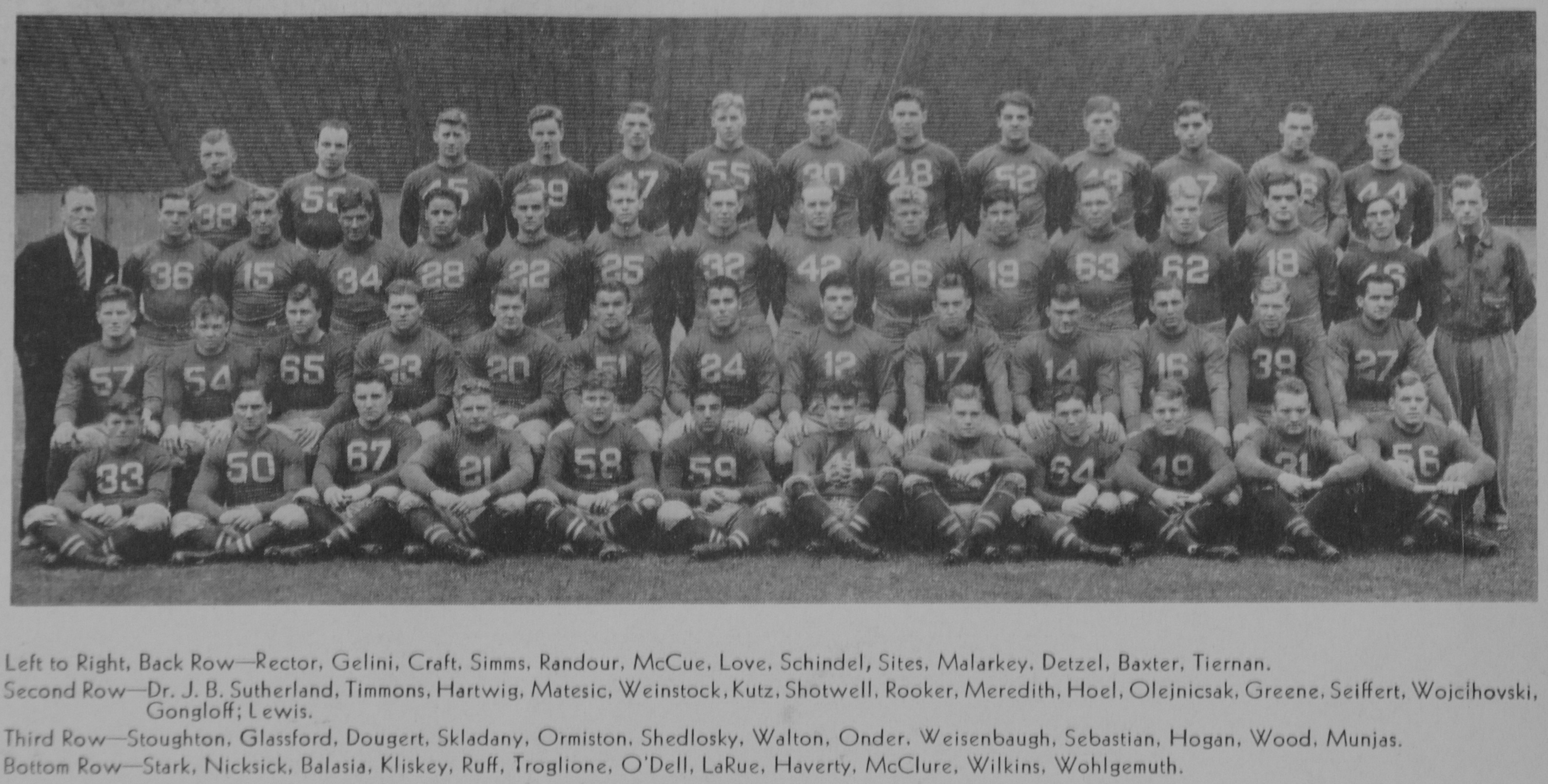
- Conference: Independent
- Record: 8–1
- Head coach: Jock Sutherland (10th season)
- Offensive scheme: Single-wing
- Home stadium: Pitt Stadium

1933 Eastern college football independents records
	Conf.			Overall
Team	W	L	T	W		L		T
No. 7 Princeton		–		9	–	0	–	0
Duquesne		–		10	–	1	–	0
No. 9 Army		–		9	–	1	–	0
Boston College		–		8	–	1	–	0
Columbia		–		8	–	1	–	0
Pittsburgh		–		8	–	1	–	0
Colgate		–		6	–	1	–	1
Bucknell		–		7	–	2	–	0
Fordham		–		6	–	2	–	0
Tufts		–		6	–	2	–	0
Villanova		–		7	–	2	–	1
Harvard		–		5	–	2	–	1
Drexel		–		5	–	3	–	0
Massachusetts State		–		5	–	3	–	0
Temple		–		5	–	3	–	0
Manhattan		–		5	–	3	–	1
Cornell		–		4	–	3	–	0
Carnegie Tech		–		4	–	3	–	2
La Salle		–		3	–	3	–	2
Syracuse		–		4	–	4	–	0
Yale		–		4	–	4	–	0
Penn State		–		3	–	3	–	1
Brown		–		3	–	5	–	0
Vermont		–		3	–	5	–	0
Franklin & Marshall		–		4	–	5	–	0
NYU		–		2	–	4	–	1
Penn		–		2	–	4	–	1
Northeastern		–		1	–	3	–	1
Boston University		–		2	–	5	–	0
Washington & Jefferson		–		2	–	7	–	1
CCNY		–		1	–	5	–	1
Rankings from Dickinson System

The 1933 Pittsburgh Panthers football team was an American football team that represented the University of Pittsburgh as an independent during the 1933 college football season. In its tenth season under head coach Jock Sutherland, the team compiled an 8–1 record, shut out seven of its nine opponents, and outscored all opponents by a total of 147 to 13. The team played its home games at Pitt Stadium in Pittsburgh.

End Joe Skladany was a consensus first-team selection to the 1933 All-America team.

== Schedule ==
Date	Time	Opponent	Site	Result	Attendance	Source
September 30		Washington & Jefferson	Pitt Stadium; Pittsburgh, PA	W 9–0	15,000	
October 7		at West Virginia	Mountaineer Field; Morgantown, WV (rivalry)	W 21–0	10,000	
October 14		Navy^{†}	Pitt Stadium; Pittsburgh, PA	W 34–6	45,000	
October 21		at Minnesota	Memorial Stadium; Minneapolis, MN	L 3–7	26,000	
October 28		at Notre Dame	Notre Dame Stadium; Notre Dame, IN (rivalry)	W 14–0	16,627–25,000	
November 4	2:30 p.m.	Centre	Pitt Stadium; Pittsburgh, PA	W 37–0	10,000	
November 11		Duquesne	Pitt Stadium; Pittsburgh, PA	W 7–0	55,711	
November 18		Nebraska	Pitt Stadium; Pittsburgh, PA	W 6–0	20,000	
November 30		Carnegie Tech	Pitt Stadium; Pittsburgh, PA	W 16–0	42,000	
^{†}Homecoming; All times are in Eastern time

== Preseason ==
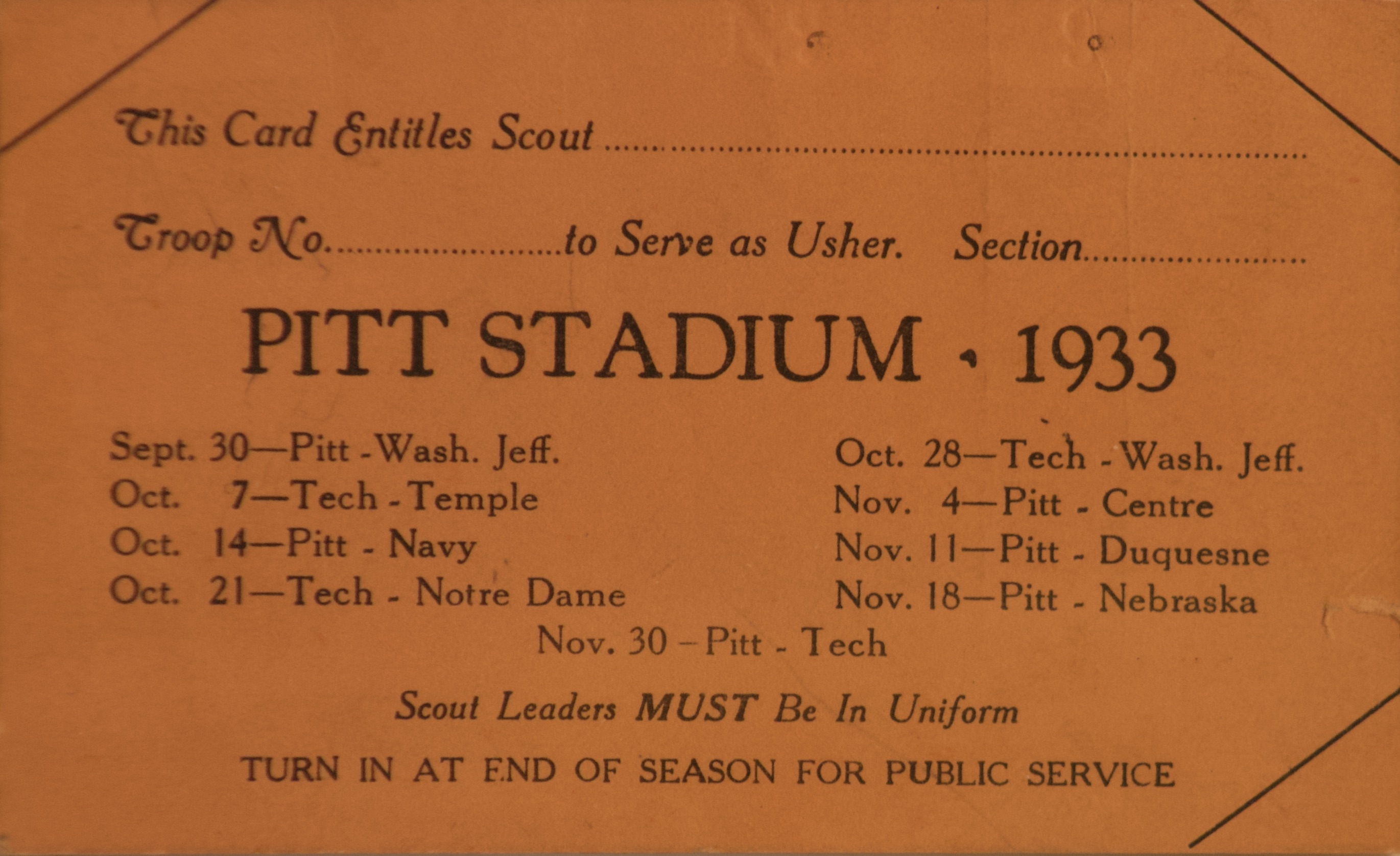
1933 University of Pittsburgh football season Boy Scout usher pass

At their February 10 meeting, the athletic board of the University of Pittsburgh appointed James Hagan to the office of Graduate Manager of student athletics, and named Leroy Lewis (Col. '34) Varsity Manager for the 1933 football season.

On March 15, ninety young men enrolled in spring football practice under the direction of Coach Sutherland and his assistants. Claire Burcky of The Pittsburgh Press reported: "Ralph Daugherty took the centers, Joe Donchess the ends, Bill Kern the tackles, Ray Montgomery the guards. Skip Gougler herded the frosh together for a series of maneuvers. Dr. Sutherland, Andy Gustafson and Eddie Baker put three squads of backs through their paces." Coach Sutherland told The Pitt News:

"Spring practices at Pitt are far more important although they are considerably shorter than the majority of such sessions at other colleges and universities. Just about two weeks before we are to begin our fall campaign, the boys go to camp. About all the time we have there is to get the boys into condition for their strenuous season. At the spring practices we must outline and work on the plays which we will use during our season, which the other schools can do in the fall because of their long preliminary training period. I personally don't like the idea of a long spring practice. I feel that the participants are under too much of a strain, and the boys suffer too much scholastically, which is more important than spring training."

On May 5, the Panther team ended their spring session with an intra-squad game pitting the varsity against the reserves. The varsity prevailed 21 to 0. The following day, Dr. Sutherland officially concluded the spring drills with his second annual football clinic for coaches and players from the Tri-State area. 135 participants attended lectures and watched demonstrations of football technique and strategy.

The yearly stipend given to the football recruits was reduced from $650 to $400 for the 1933 season.

In early September coach John B. Sutherland resigned from his position in the Dental School and became a full-time Professor of Physical Education. In addition to coaching football, Coach Sutherland taught physical education classes and assisted the track, wrestling and boxing coaches.

On September 11, the Panthers were forced to hold their preseason drills on campus because heavy rains had ruined the fields at Camp Hamilton near Windber, PA. The Pittsburgh Press noted: "The boys will work out twice daily at the practice field. They'll be quartered at Webster Hall and a training table will be set up at the University Cafeteria. In the group of 52 reporting, 16 are lettermen, 15 reserves and 21 sophomores." The training camp concluded September 23 with a scrimmage game between the varsity and reserves. The varsity prevailed 27 to 0 in the rain.

== Coaching staff ==
1933 Pittsburgh Panthers football staff
Coaching staff: John B. "Jock" Sutherland – Head coach; Andy Gustafson – Assistant coach; Ralph N. Daugherty – assistant center coach; Bill Kern – assistant tackle coach; Edward Baker – assistant backfield coach; Eddie Schultz – assistant line coach; Roscoe "Skip" Gougler – Freshman coach; Edward Hirshberg – Assistant coach; Ulhard Hangartner - scout	Support staff: Dr. Ralph Shanor – team physician; George Moore – team trainer; Percy S. Browne – custodian of equipment; W. D. Harrison - director of athletics; James Hagan – graduate manager of athletics; Frank Carver – publicity director; Leroy Lewis – student manager

== Roster ==
1933 Pittsburgh Panthers football roster
Player	Position	Games	Height	Weight	Class	Prep School	Hometown
Tarciscio Onder*	guard	9	5' 11"	197	1934	Jeannette H. S.	Jeannette, PA
Mike Sebastian*	halfback	9	5' 10"	167	1934	Sharon H. S.	Sharon, Pa.
Charles Hartwig*	guard	9	5' 11"	170	1934	Warwood H. S.	Wheeling, WV
Robert Hogan*	quarterback	9	5' 10"	180	1934	Meadville H. S.	Meadville, PA
Henry A. Weisenbaugh*	halfback	9	5' 10"	174	1935	Tarentum H. S.	Tarentum, PA
Louis Wojcihovski	end	2	6' 1"	170	1935	Weston H. S.	Weston, WV
Stanley Oleojnicsak	tackle	5	5' 11"	180	1935	Bellaire H. S.	Bellaire, OH
Ken Ormiston*	guard	9	5' 11"	174	1935	Kiski School	Pittsburgh, PA
Nicholas Kliskey*	fullback	7	5' 7"	186	1935	Scott H. S.	North Braddock, PA
Frank W. Kutz*	guard	8	6'	180	1935	Montgomery School	McKeesport, PA
Joe Skladany*	end	9	5' 8"	184	1934	Larksville H. S.	Larksville, PA
Frank Walton*	tackle	9	5' 10"	197	1934	Beaver Falls H. S.	Beaver Falls, PA
George Shotwell*	center	9	5' 10"	165	1935	Hanover Twp. H. S.	Wilkes-Barre, PA
Robert Hoel*	tackle	8	5' 11"	193	1935	Evanston Twp. H. S.	Evanston, IL
Miller Munjas*	halfback	9	5' 10"	160	1935	Bellaire H. S.	Bellaire, OH
Isadore Weinstock*	fullback	9	6'	194	1935	Coughlin H. S.	Wilkes-Barre, PA
James Simms	halfback	0	5' 10"	165	1934	Kiski School	Monongahela, PA
John Love	tackle	4	6' 1"	196	1934	Jeannette H. S.	Jeannette, PA
Leslie C. Wilkins	center	2	5' 10"	178	1935	Kiski School	Rock Falls, IL
Harvey E. Rooker*	end	8	6' 1"	179	1935	Tarentum H. S.	Tarentum, PA
Marwood Stark	guard	0	5' 10"	169	1935	Allentown H. S.	Allentown, PA
Richard Matesic*	halfback	9	5' 11"	176	1934	Bellefonte Academy	Wheeling, WV
Robert Timmons*	end	6	6'	168	1934	Allegheny H. S.	Pittsburgh, PA
Arthur Detzel	tackle	4	5' 10"	189	1936	Erie East H. S.	Erie, PA
Leonard Rector	fullback	2	5' 9"	175	1936	Avella H. S.	Avella, PA
John Wood	halfback	0	5' 10"	160	1936	Magrotta H. S.	New Martinsville, WV
Robert LaRue	halfback	0	5' 9"	160	1936	Wyoming Seminary	Greensburg, PA
Howard O'Dell*	halfback	9	5' 9"	160	1934	Central H. S.	Sioux City, IA
John Meredith*	tackle	9	6'	180	1934	Bellefonte Academy	Fairmont, WV
Leo Malarkey	halfback	0	5' 10"	165	1936	McDonald H. S.	McDonald, PA
Frank Tiernan	tackle	2	6'	185	1934	Sewickley H. S.	Sewickley, PA
Arthur Craft	end	1	6'	179	1934	New Castle H. S.	New Castle, PA
Charles Gongloff	center	1	5' 10"	170	1936	Nanty-Glo H. S.	Nanty-Glo, PA
Hubert Randour*	halfback	5	5' 11"	168	1936	McDonald H. S.	McDonald, PA
Arthur Schindel	end	1	6'	174	1936	Aurora H. S.	Aurora, IL
Robert McClure	halfback	0	5' 8"	157	1936	Greenville H. S.	Greenville, PA
Michael Nicksick*	halfback	5	5' 10"	164	1935	Burgettstown H. S.	Burgettstown, PA
Leon Shedlosky*	halfback	8	5' 9"	165	1936	Nanticoke H. S.	Nanticoke, PA
Vincent Sites	end	4	6' 1"	189	1936	St. John's H. S.	Pittston, PA
Howard Gelini	quarterback	1	5' 10"	170	1934	Weirton H. S.	Weirton, WV
William Glassford	guard	0	5' 9"	180	1936	Lancaster H. S.	Lancaster, Ohio
Earl McCue	end	1	6' 1"	185	1936	Wilkinsburg H. S.	Wilkinsburg, PA
Leon Wohlgemuth	guard	1	5' 10"	179	1936	Bellaire H. S.	Bellaire, OH
Gene Stoughton	guard	0	5' 11"	180	1936	Oil City H. S.	Oil City, PA
Arthur Ruff	halfback	2	5' 9"	150	1935	Etna H. S.	Etna, PA
Joseph Troglione	halfback	2	5' 9"	164	1936	Wilkinsburg H. S.	Wilkinsburg, PA
Samuel Dorfman	guard	0	5' 10"	180	1936	Scranton H. S.	Scranton, PA
Karl P. Seiffert	end	1	6'	175	1935	Jeannette H. S.	Jeannette, PA
Arnold Greene	quarterback	0	6' 1"	195	1936	Huntingdon H. S.	Huntingdon, PA
William Haverty	halfback	0	5' 9"	155	1936	Pittsburgh, PA	
John Dougert	halfback	0	5' 8"	160	1936	Shenandoah H. S.	Shenandoah, PA
Verne Baxter	end	5	5' 10"	170	1936	Oliver H. S.	Joliet, IL
Walter Balasia	halfback	1	5' 10"	160	1935	Hanover Twp. H. S.	Wilkes-Barre, PA
Leroy Lewis*	varsity student manager				1934	Derry H. S.	Derry, PA
Christy Jones	"B" team student manager				1934	Taylor Allderdice H. S.	Pittsburgh, PA
* Letterman

== Game summaries ==
=== Washington & Jefferson ===
Week 1: Washington & Jefferson at Pitt

Team	1	2	3	4	Total
Washington & Jefferson	0	0	0	0	0
• Pitt	0	0	0	9	9

- Date: September 30, 1933
- Location: Pitt Stadium
  Pittsburgh, PA
- Game start: 2:00 p.m.
- Game attendance: 15,000
- Game weather: sunny
- Referee: Dexter W. Very (Penn State)

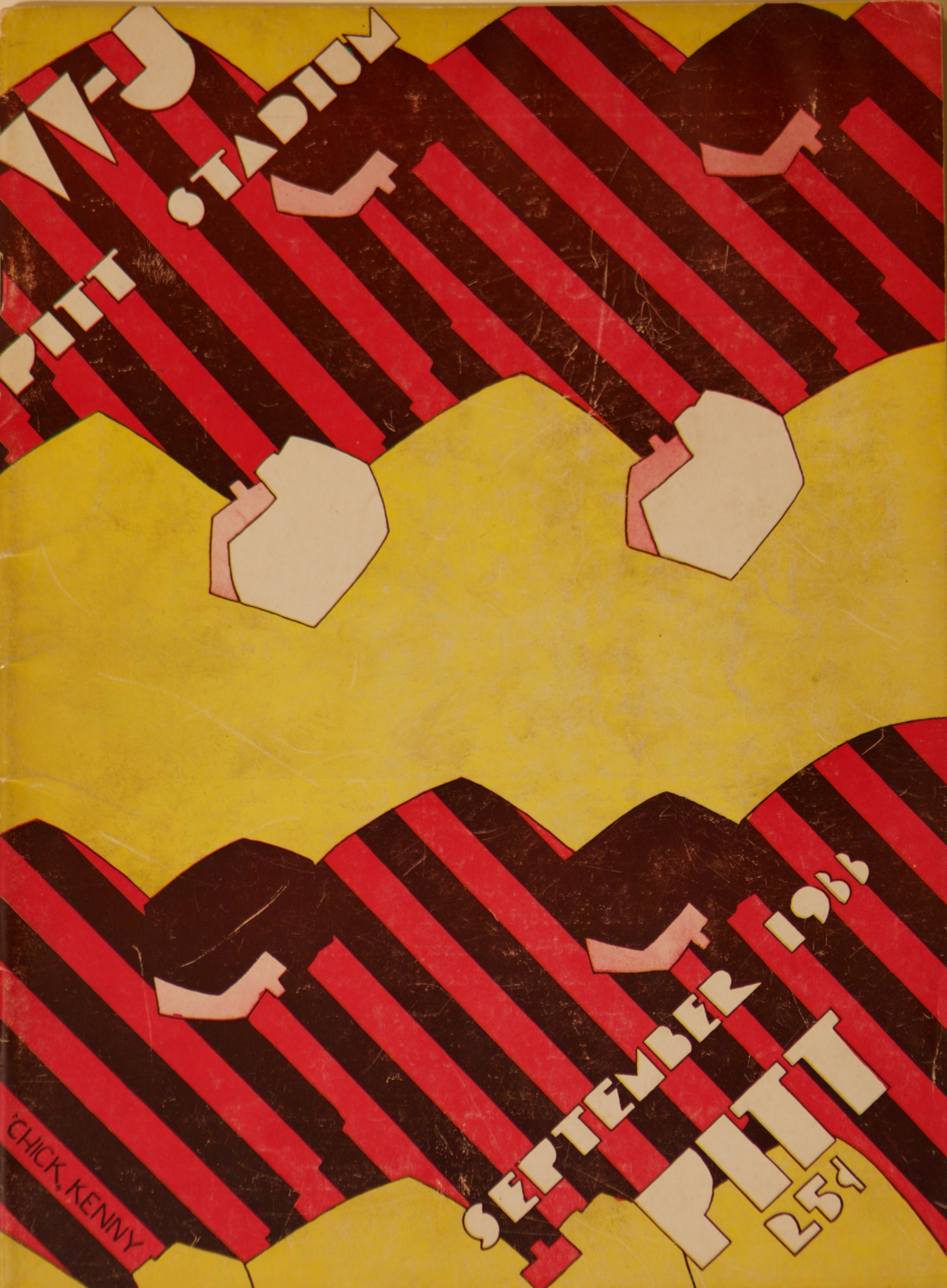
September 30, 1933 "Varsity News" - official football program for the Pitt versus W. & J. game

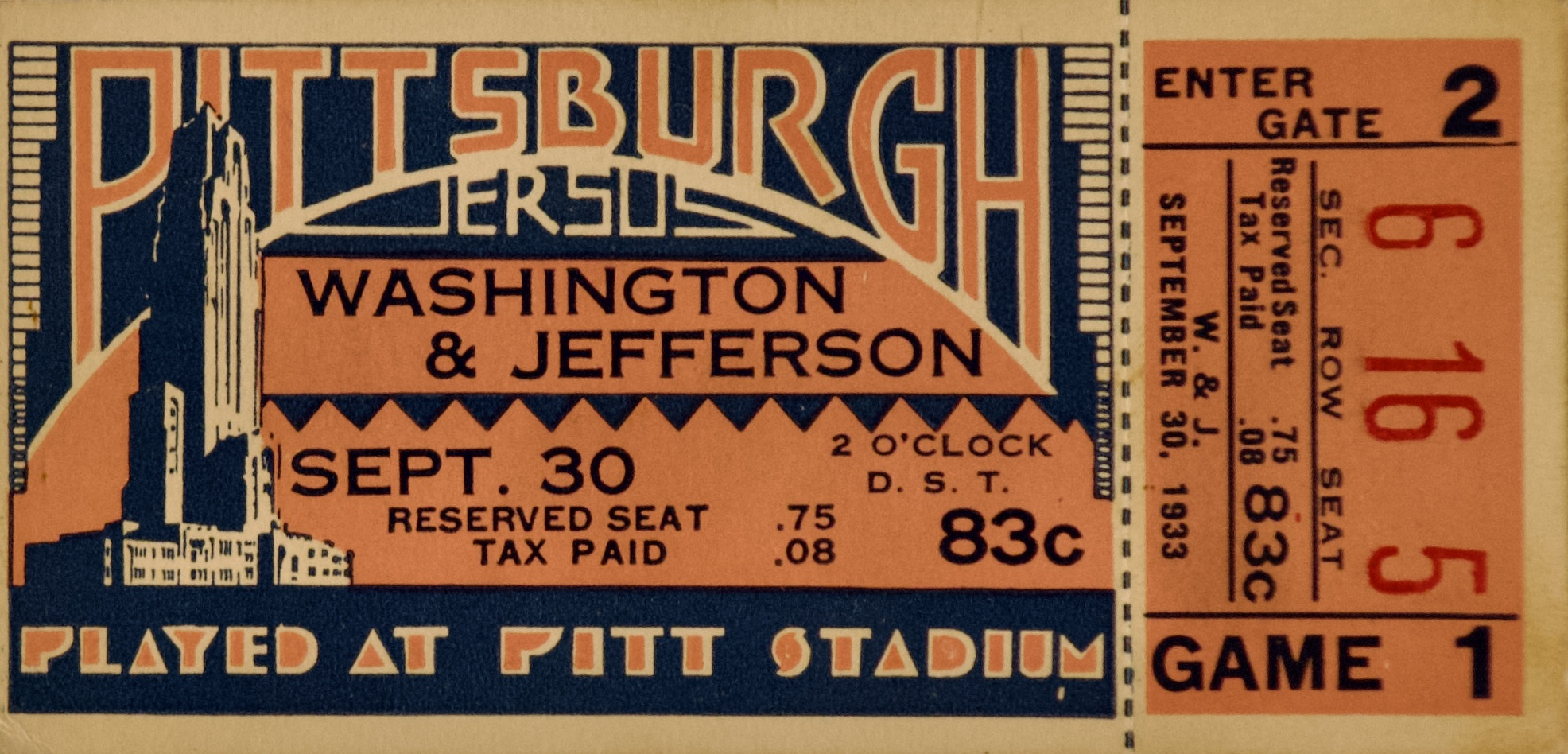
September 30, 1933 ticket stub from Pitt vs. Washington & Jefferson game

After a three year hiatus, the Panthers opened the season against their long time rival - the Presidents of Washington & Jefferson College. Pitt only led the all-time series 15–13–2, but were 11–2–2 in the previous 15 games played. The Presidents were led by second-year coach Leroy P. "Hank" Day. Day was a member of the 1914 W. & J. team that finished 10–1. He was a successful football coach at Washington High School for 16 seasons prior to returning to his alma mater. His job was made difficult with the administration's decision to de-emphasize football. No athletic scholarships, no training table and no favors to athletes were permitted. The Presidents finished a respectable 5–3–1 in his first year. Coach Day told Robert E. Badger of The Pitt News: "We entertain no hopes whatever of upsetting the Panthers, and our main objective will be to hold the score as low as possible and give the fans a good game....Our squad is in extremely bad physical condition and reserves are scarce."

Coach Sutherland respected coach Day's coaching ability and expected a typical Pitt – W. & J. battle, since this game was always "THE BIG game of the Presidents' schedule." The Pitt lineup was experienced, having 16 lettermen on the roster from the 1932 team. For the opening game, Sutherland decided on Mike Nicksick over Howard O'Dell and Richard Matesic to succeed the departed All-American Warren Heller at left halfback.

Chester Smith of The Pittsburgh Press reported: "The Pitt football team that trotted into the Stadium yesterday afternoon with every expectation of making short shrift of Washington and Jefferson still had to score its first point after 56 minutes of the game had been played. That the score four minutes later was Pitt 9, Wash-Jeff 0, may give some indication of the frenzied finish that set half the 15,000 spectators wild with joy and plunged the others into a purplish gloom."

Both defenses ruled the first three quarters. The Pitt offense took the opening kick-off and advanced the ball to the W. & J. 25-yard line. The Presidents defense held and the Panthers turned the ball over on downs. A punting duel ensued for the remainder of the period. Sutherland sent in his second team at the start of the second quarter. Fullback Henry Weisenbaugh fumbled on the Pitt 24-yard line and end Rod Rittersbaugh recovered for the Prexies. The Presidents offense moved the ball to the Pitt 8-yard line. Sutherland rushed the first team back into the fray and the Panther defense pushed W. & J. back to the 19-yard line. Joe Hardy was short on a 31-yard field goal attempt. The first half ended 0 to 0. The punting duel continued in the third quarter until Pitt back Hub Randour fumbled on his 45-yard line and Elwood Headley recovered for W. & J. The Presidents advanced the pigskin to the Pitt 10-yard line before the Panther defense stiffened and forced another futile field goal attempt by Hardy. In the last period the Pitt offense advanced the ball to the Wash-Jeff 15-yard line and lost the ball on downs. On second down Pitt end Joe Skladany intercepted a lateral and was tackled on the 5-yard line. On first down Pitt back Mike Sebastian fumbled the ball back to the Presidents. The Pitt defense forced a punt and regained possession on the Presidents 40-yard line. Richard Matesic replaced Sebastian and promptly tossed a pass to Howard O'Dell on the 9-yard line. On fourth down Isadore Weinstock was perfect on an 18-yard field goal for the first points of the game. Pitt led 3 to 0. On their ensuing possession, the Presidents gained two first downs into Pitt territory at the 45-yard line. On first down Weinstock intercepted Bill King's pass and Pitt had possession on their own 40-yard line. The Panther offense moved the ball to the W. & J. 38-yard line with three rushes and an off-side penalty. On first down O' Dell raced around right end for a touchdown. Weinstock missed the extra point, but Pitt survived 9 to 0. The Presidents finished the season with a 2–7–1 record.

The Pitt starting lineup for the game against Washington & Jefferson was Harvey Rooker (left end), John Meredith (left tackle), Charles Hartwig (left guard), George Shotwell (center), Tarciscio Onder (right guard), Frank Walton (right tackle), Joseph Skladany (right end), Bob Hogan (quarterback), Mike Nicksick (left halfback), Mike Sebastian (right halfback) and Isadore Weinstock (fullback). Substitutes appearing in the game for Pitt were Verne Baxter, John Love, Bob Hoel, Ken Ormiston, Nick Kliskey, Frank Kutz, Robert Timmons, Miller Munjas, Howard O'Dell, Hub Randour, Richard Matesic, Leon Shedlosky and Henry Weisenbaugh.

Scoring summary

Quarter	Time	Drive			Team	Scoring information	Score	
Quarter	Time	Plays	Yards	TOP	Team	Scoring information	Washington & Jefferson	Pittsburgh
4		6	31		Pittsburgh	18-yard field goal by Isadore Weinstock	0	3
4		5	60		Pittsburgh	Howard O'Dell 38-yard touchdown run, Weinstock kick no good	0	9
"TOP" = time of possession. For other American football terms, see Glossary of American football.							0	9

=== At West Virginia ===
Week 2: Pitt at West Virginia

Team	1	2	3	4	Total
• Pitt	7	0	14	0	21
West Virginia	0	0	0	0	0

- Date: October 7, 1933
- Location: Mountaineer Field
  Morgantown, WV
- Game start: 2:30 p.m.
- Game attendance: 10,000
- Game weather: warm and cloudy
- Referee: W. G. Crowell (Swarthmore)

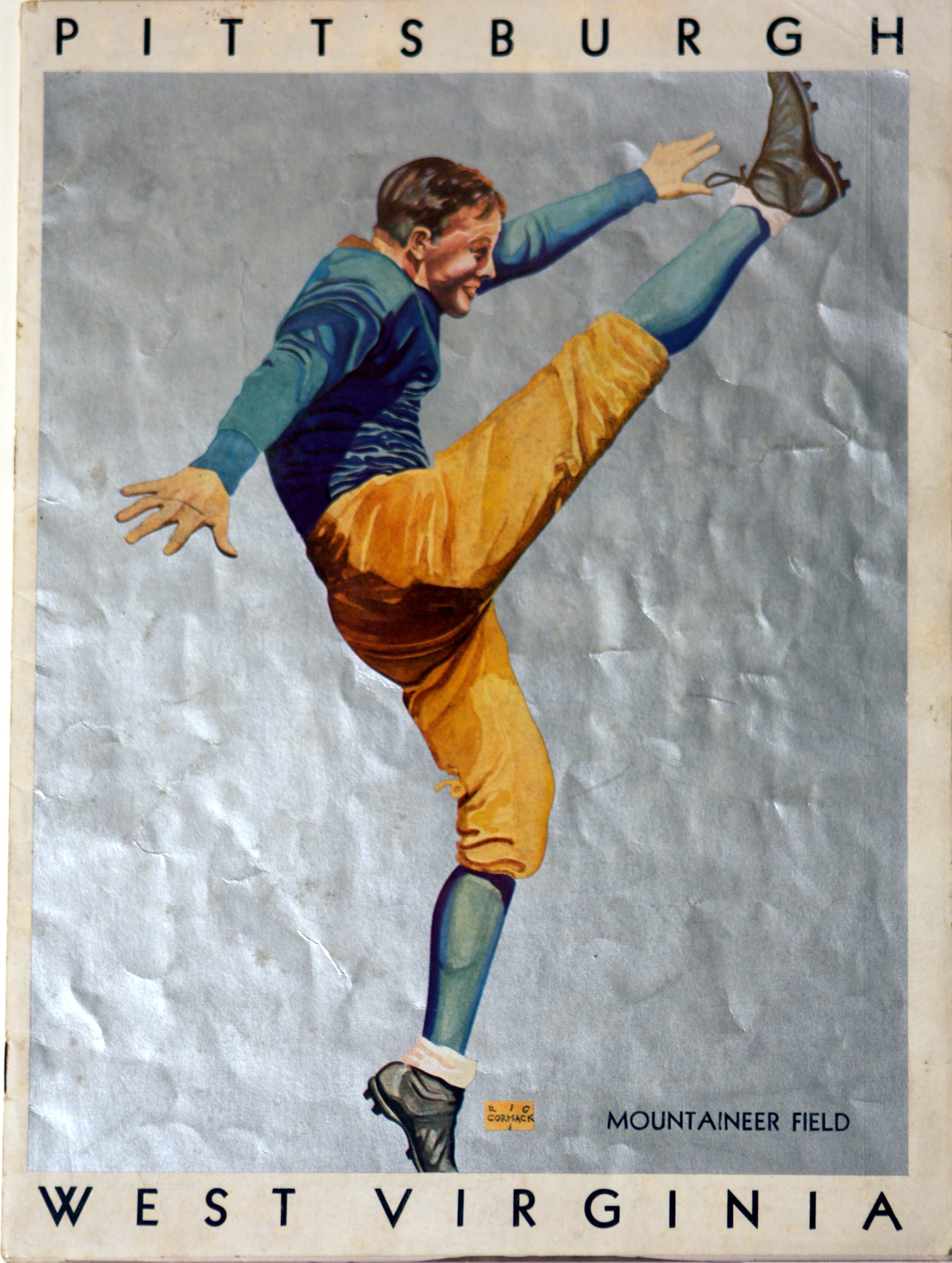
October 7, 1933 program for the Pitt versus West Virginia football game

On October 7, the Panthers 32-man traveling squad bussed to Morgantown, WV for the 29th edition of the "Backyard Brawl". Pitt led the series 19–8–1, and were 8–1 in the past 9 games. The remainder of the Panther squad travelled to Scranton, PA for a "B" team game against St. Thomas College, coached by former Pitt football lettermen - Jack Harding and Hart Morris .

Third-year Mountaineer coach Greasy Neale had a 9–11 record after two seasons, but had not beaten the Panthers. His eleven opened the season with a scoreless tie against Washington & Lee and a loss to Duquesne 19–7 on Forbes Field.

Sutherland wrote in his weekly newspaper column: "Our team must be given the edge, although I still think West Virginia has a team of potential strength. The Mountaineers opening their home season, will be desperate to make up for a tie and a defeat, and will be hard to beat for that reason." Coach Sutherland tweaked the lineup by starting Nick Kliskey at center over George Shotwell and Howard O'Dell at left halfback instead of Mike Nicksick. Jock named John Meredith, a Fairmont, West Virginia native, captain for the game. In 1928 the Mountaineers beat the Panthers 9–6 and their Captain that day was John's older brother Russell. Pitt guard Tarciscio Onder lined up across from his brother, starting Mountaineer end, Angelo Onder.

Prior to the game Miss Genevieve Pixler, the only licensed female pilot in the state of West Virginia, flew over Mountaineer Field and dropped the game ball.

Exhibiting much improvement from the previous week, the Pitt Panthers defeated a stubborn West Virginia eleven 21–0. The Panthers started their first possession on their 39-yard line. The offense advanced the ball to the West Virginia five. Isadore Weinstock gained 2 yards up the middle. Then Mike Sebastian fumbled forward into the end zone where Pitt tackle John Meredith fell on the ball for the touchdown. Weinstock added the point after and Pitt led 7–0. After an exchange of punts, Mountaineer end Romeo MacDonald blocked a Pitt punt and his teammate Charles Goodwin recovered the ball on the Pitt 2-yard line. Jess Carver of the Sun-Telegraph noted: "After four tries the Mountaineers wound up with the ball on the three-yard line." Pitt was able to punt out of danger. Sutherland substituted second and third teamers into the second period action but the score remained 7–0 at halftime. After intermission the Pitt offense marched 87 yards to pay dirt, with O'Dell rushing the last nine yards for the score. Weinstock was good on the point after and Pitt led 14 to 0. The Panther defense forced a punt and took possession on their own 20-yard line. On first down Henry Weisenbaugh "tore like a miniature whirlwind through his own right guard, cut toward the sidelines on the short side and scampered the 30 [sic] yards to the goal." Tarciscio Onder added the extra point. The Mountaineers penetrated deep into Pitt territory early in the last period, but lost the ball on downs on the 2-yard line. Pitt punted out of danger and the remainder of the game was played in West Virginia territory. The Mountaineers finished the season with a 3–5–3 record.

The Pitt starting lineup for the game against West Virginia was Harvey Rooker (left end), John Meredith (left tackle), Charles Hartwig (left guard), Nick Kliskey (center), Tarciscio Onder (right guard), Frank Walton (right tackle), Joseph Skladany (right end), Robert Hogan (quarterback), Howard O' Dell (left halfback), Mike Sebastian (right halfback) and Isadore Weinstock (fullback). Substitutes appearing in the game for Pitt were Verne Baxter, Robert Hoel, Ken Ormiston, George Shotwell, Frank Kutz, John Love, Stanley Olejnicsak, Arthur Detzel, Vincent Sites, Miller Munjas, Hub Randour, Mike Nicksick, Richard Matesic, Leon Shedlosky and Henry Weisenbaugh.

The Panther "B" team lost to St. Thomas College 13–0.

Scoring summary

Quarter	Time	Drive			Team	Scoring information	Score	
Quarter	Time	Plays	Yards	TOP	Team	Scoring information	Pittsburgh	West Virginia
1			61		Pittsburgh	John Meredith recovered Mike Sebastian's fumble in the end zone, Isadore Weinstock converted the point after	7	0
3			87		Pittsburgh	Howard O'Dell 9-yard touchdown run, Weinstock kick good	14	0
3		1	80		Pittsburgh	Henry Weisenbaugh 80-yard touchdown run, Tarciscio Onder kick good	21	0
"TOP" = time of possession. For other American football terms, see Glossary of American football.							21	0

=== Navy ===
Week 3: Navy at Pitt

Team	1	2	3	4	Total
Navy	0	0	0	6	6
• Pitt	0	7	20	7	34

- Date: October 14, 1933
- Location: Pitt Stadium
  Pittsburgh, PA
- Game start: 2:00 p.m.
- Game attendance: 45,000
- Game weather: cloudy
- Referee: Dexter W. Very (Penn State)

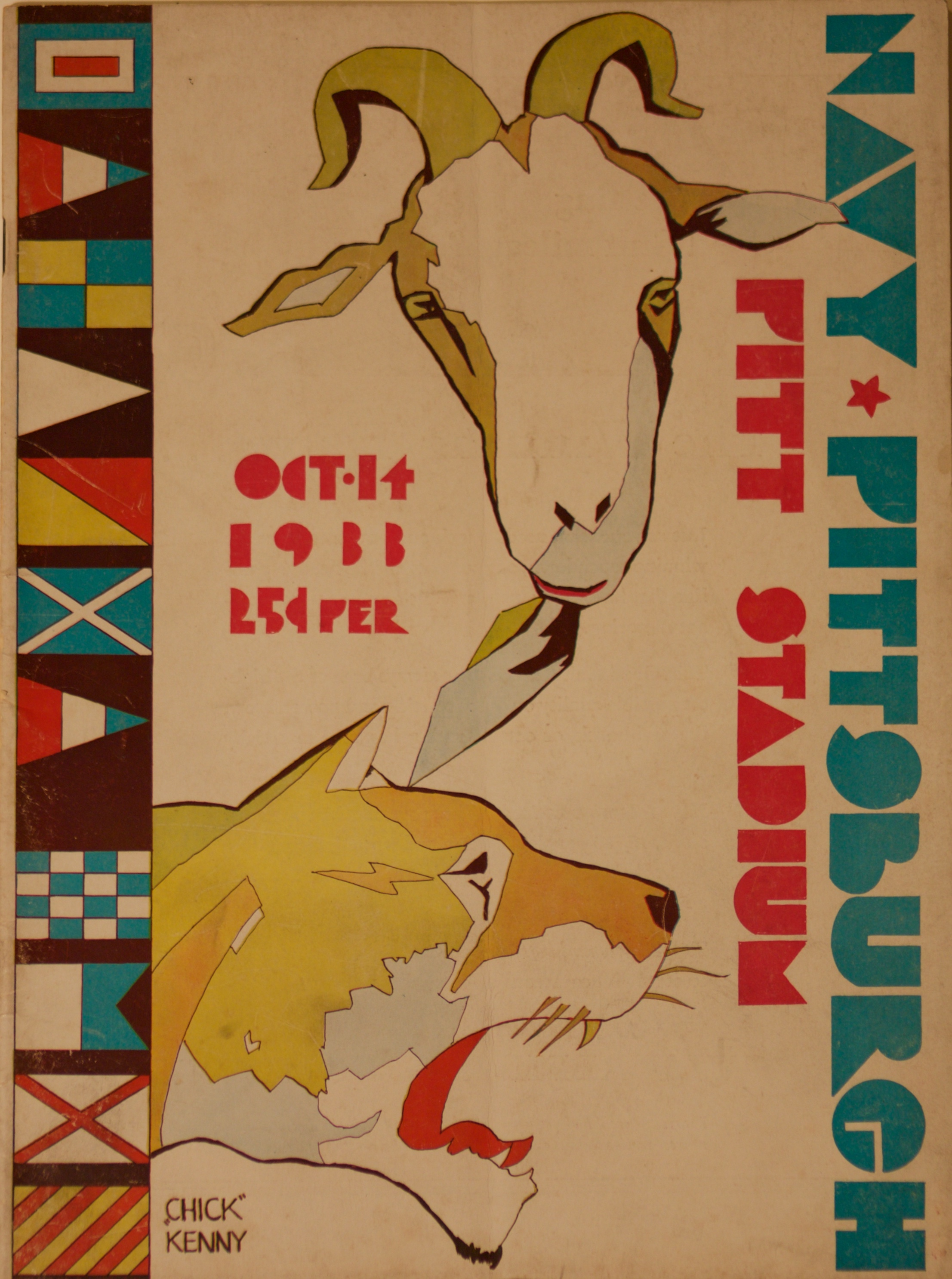
Program for the October 14, 1933 Pitt versus Navy football game

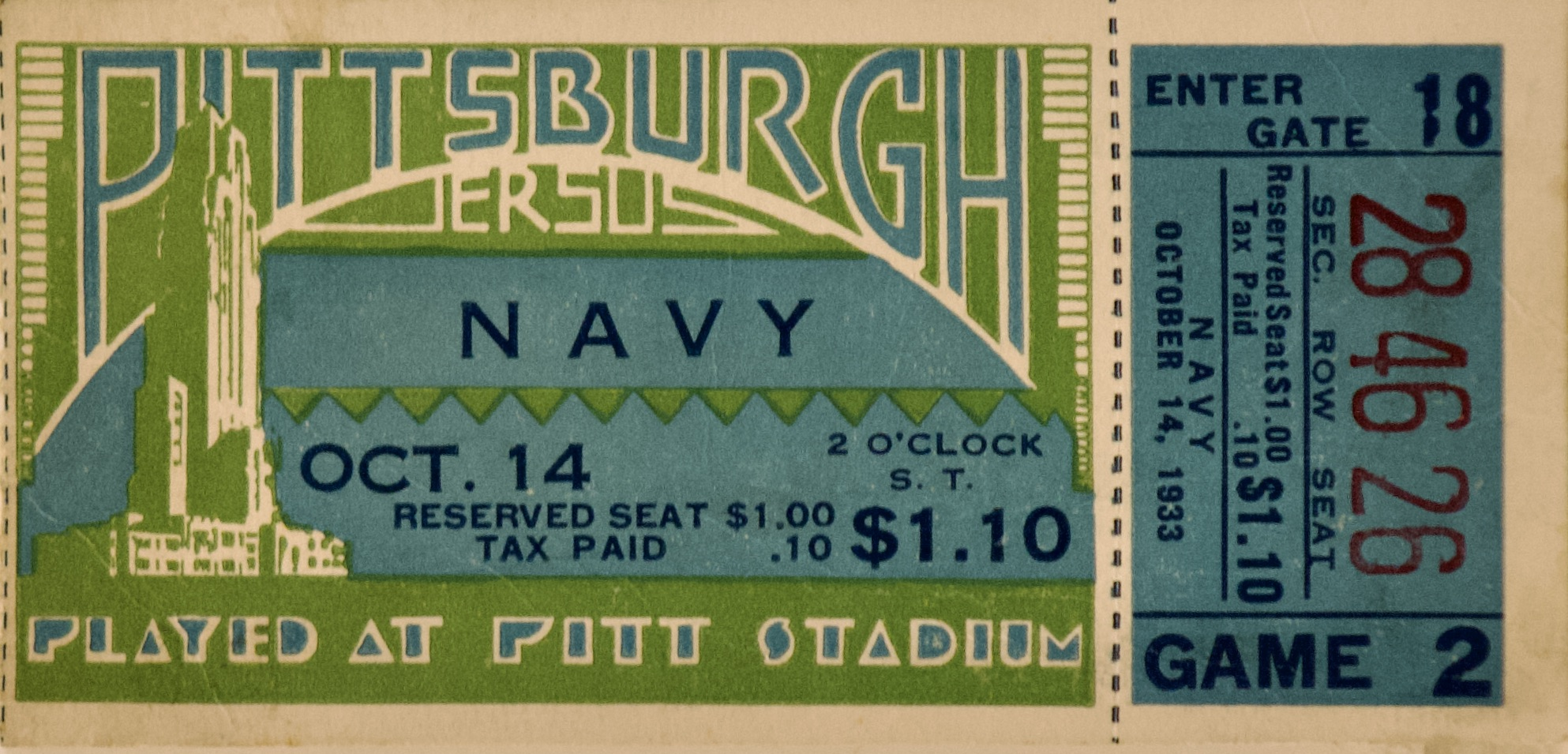
October 14, 1933 ticket stub for the Pitt versus Navy football game

The Panthers first welcomed the Midshipmen of Navy to Pitt Stadium for the October 14 Homecoming Game. The Panthers led the series 3–1–1, but all the games had been played in Annapolis, MD. The Panthers and Midshipmen last met on the gridiron in 1916 when Pitt eked out a 20 to 19 victory on their way to a second straight unbeaten season.

The Middies were led by third year coach Edgar Miller. Miller was a member of the famed "Seven Mules" line that blocked for the "Four Horsemen" on the 1924 Notre Dame national championship team. His squad was 2–0 on the season having beaten both William & Mary (12–0) and Mercer (25–6) at home. The Middies only lost three starters from the 1932 team and were considered one of the contenders for Eastern honors. Coach Miller told The Sun: "I am satisfied with the Navy team. The players are in a nice frame of mind. They are a spirited, hard-fighting bunch of boys. We may not lick Pitt, but we will be in their hair, I'll tell you that."

With the pending arrival of the Navy goat, the University of Pittsburgh decided it was time to have a real panther mascot. The management of the Warner Theater in downtown Pittsburgh purchased one from New Mexico and had it flown to Pittsburgh. The Pitt News reported: "The Pitt News office was saddened by the untimely death Wednesday night of 'Little Mike,' Pitt's new live Panther mascot. Passing into Panther Paradise in the arms of David Immerman, business manager of the Pitt News, the little fellow fell the victim of fright and constipation just after he had his picture taken and was ready to become a Pittsburgh celebrity tonight." A second panther cub was obtained and "Mike The Second" became Pitt's official mascot. The presentation of the panther to the University was held on the eve of the homecoming game, in conjunction with the first showing of the football movie "Saturday's Millions" at the Warner Theater. The team and coaches, band, cheerleaders and students were in attendance. On Saturday, the panther mascot was introduced as "Jock" to the Navy goat at halftime. Warner Brothers cameramen filmed the ceremony and parts of the game.

Chester L. Smith of The Pittsburgh Press penned: "A sailor may have a sweetheart in every port, but Pitt had something better – a kick in every play – as the Navy discovered yesterday at the Stadium when the Panthers completely submerged the men from Annapolis by a 34-to-6 score."

The first quarter was scoreless, but Pitt's defense was tested as Navy penetrated to the Panther 7-yard line before Pitt took over on downs. The Panther offense orchestrated a seven play, 76-yard touchdown drive in the second period culminating, with Isadore Weinstock carrying the pigskin the final two yards for the first score. Weinstock converted the point after and Pitt led 7 to 0 at halftime. The Panthers dominated the third quarter. Navy was forced to punt on their opening possession. The Panther drive started from their 47-yard line. Two pass plays from Howard O'Dell to Harvey Rooker moved the ball to the Navy 29-yard line. On first down Henry Weisenbaugh, second-string fullback, raced into the end zone for the touchdown. Tarciscio Onder booted the point after. Pitt 14 to Navy 0. Pitt quarterback Bob Hogan intercepted a Navy pass and the Panther offense had the ball on Navy's 44-yard line. Three plays later Hubert Randour skirted the end from the 15-yard line for the score. Onder again was good on the placement. Pitt 21 to Navy 0. The third Pitt touchdown of the quarter came on the first play after Pitt kicked off. Weisenbaugh intercepted Navy back Fred Borries' pass and raced 44 yards for the score. Weisenbaugh missed the point after. Pitt 27 to Navy 0. Coach Sutherland emptied the bench for the final stanza. The Panther subs managed an 8-play 65-yard drive for their final points of the game. Leon Shedlosky took it in from six yards out. Leonard Rector added the extra point. Navy got on the scoreboard late via a seven yard dash around end by halfback Gordon Chung-Hoon. Chung-Hoon missed the point after and the final score read Pitt 34 to Navy 6.

Navy finished the season with a 5–4 record. The Naval Academy administration decided to hire Naval Academy graduates as coaches, so Edgar Miller was demoted to assistant coach and Tom Hamilton became the Middies head coach. After 14 years as assistant line coach, Mr. Miller served as assistant athletic director at the Academy from 1948 to 1974. Mr. Hamilton would later serve as Pitt athletic director from 1949 – 1959 and head coach in 1951 and 1954.

The Pitt starting lineup for the game against Navy was Harvey Rooker (left end), John Meredith (left tackle), Charles Hartwig (left guard), Nick Kliskey (center), Tarciscio Onder (right guard), Frank Walton (right tackle), Joseph Skladany (right end), Bob Hogan (quarterback), Howard O'Dell (left halfback), Mike Sebastian (right halfback) and Isadore Weinstock (fullback). Substitutes appearing in the game for Pitt were Verne Baxter, Arthur Craft, Frank Tiernan, Arthur Schindel, Robert Hoel, Stanley Olejnicsak, Ken Ormiston, Leslie Wilkins, George Shotwell, Frank Kutz, Earl McCue, Arthur Detzel, Vincent Sites, Louis Wojcihovski, Miller Munjas, Hubert Randour, Mike Nicksick, Joseph Troglione, Richard Matesic, Leon Shedlosky, Arthur Ruff, Henry Weisenbaugh, Leonard Rector and Walter Balasia.

Scoring summary

Quarter	Time	Drive			Team	Scoring information	Score	
Quarter	Time	Plays	Yards	TOP	Team	Scoring information	Navy	Pittsburgh
2		7	76		Pittsburgh	Isadore Weinstock 2-yard touchdown run, Weinstock kick good	0	7
3		3	53		Pittsburgh	Henry Weisenbaugh 29-yard touchdown run, Tarciscio Onder kick good	0	14
3		4	44		Pittsburgh	Hub Randour 15-yard touchdown run, Onder kick good	0	21
3		1			Pittsburgh	Interception returned 43 yards for touchdown by Weisenbaugh, Weisenbaugh kick no good	0	27
4		8	65		Pittsburgh	Leon Shedlosky 6-yard touchdown run, Leonard Rector kick good	0	34
4		2	24		Navy	Gordon Chung-Hoon 7-yard touchdown run, Chung-Hoon kick no good	6	34
"TOP" = time of possession. For other American football terms, see Glossary of American football.							6	34

=== At Minnesota ===
Week 4: Pitt at Minnesota

Team	1	2	3	4	Total
Pitt	0	3	0	0	3
• Minnesota	7	0	0	0	7

- Date: October 21, 1933
- Location: Memorial Stadium
  Minneapolis, MN
- Game start: 2:00 p.m.
- Game attendance: 26,000
- Game weather: sunny and cold
- Referee: Frank Birch (Earlham)

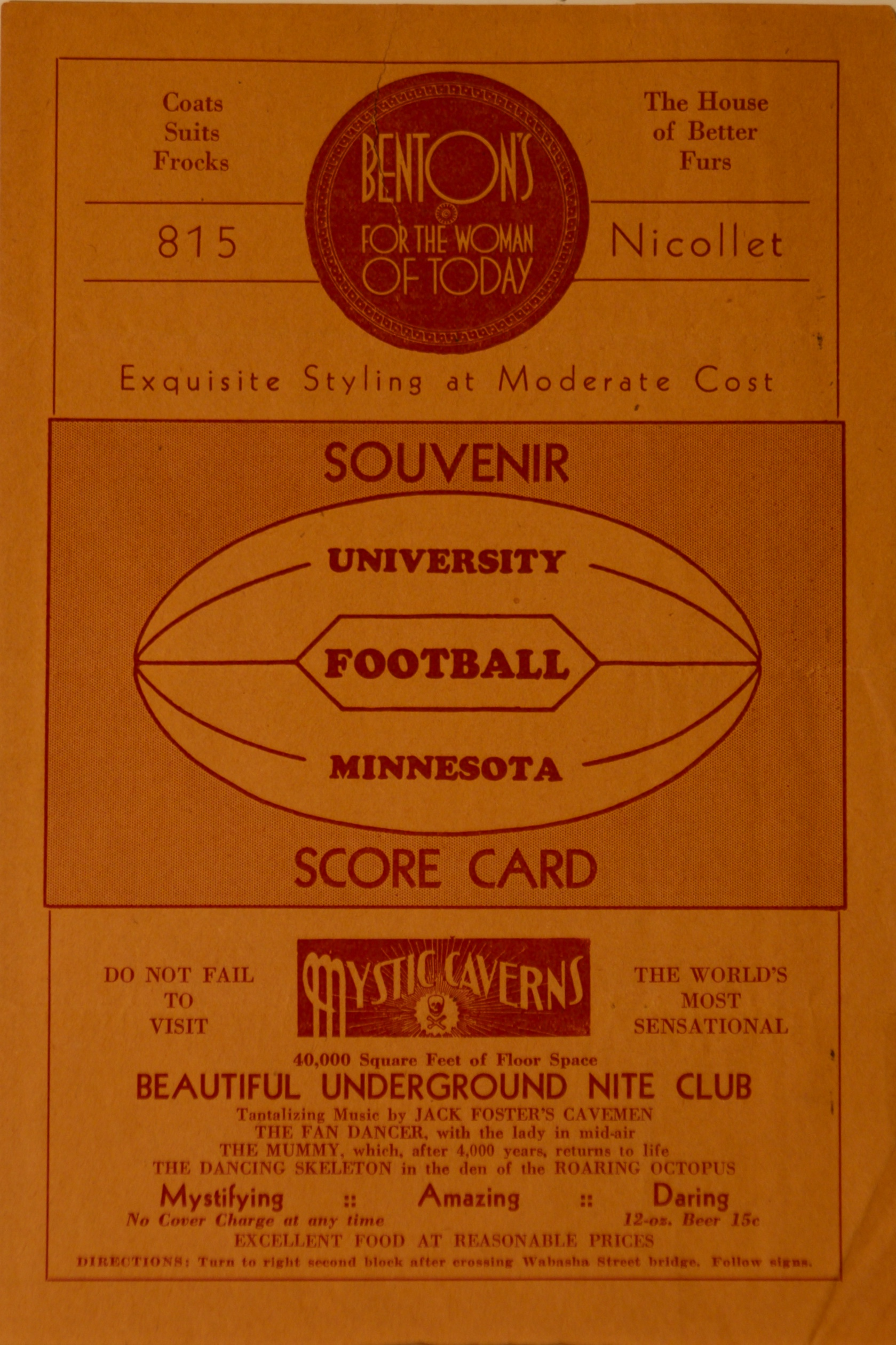
Scorecard for the October 21, 1933 Minnesota versus Pitt football game

On October 21, the Panther squad played the Bernie Bierman-led Minnesota Gophers. After coaching the previous five years at Tulane, Bierman was in his second year at his alma mater. While at Tulane he led the Green Wave to three Southern Conference Championships, and his undefeated 1931 (10–0) team went to the 1932 Rose Bowl where they fell victim to USC (21–12). Bierman played halfback for the Gophers from 1913 to 1915, when the team compiled a 17–3–1 record. His present Gophers had a 1–0–2 record. They beat South Dakota State (19–6) and tied Big Ten opponents Indiana (6–6) and Purdue (7–7). The Gophers roster had three players mentioned on various All-American teams - end Frank Larson, halfback Francis "Pug" Lund and center Ray Oen.

On the two-day trip west, the Panthers enjoyed a stopover in Chicago with both a workout at Stagg Field and a tour of the Chicago World's Fair. The Panther entourage arrived in Minneapolis on Friday morning. Coach Sutherland changed the starting lineup. Isadore Weinstock was injured and replaced by Henry Weisenbaugh. Miller Munjas started at quarterback and Robert Hoel started at left tackle. Sutherland spoke with The Minneapolis Tribune: "We are here to make every effort to win but whether we succeed is something that I can't guarantee, you know.... I look for a tough game and whichever team wins will do so by a low score."

George A. Barton of The Minneapolis Tribune reported: "Playing with a fury that would not be denied, the Gophers blasted their way into national football prominence by defeating a really great Pittsburgh team, 7 to 3, before 26,000 frenzied rooters at Memorial Stadium Saturday afternoon."

The Panthers kicked off and recovered Gopher back Francis "Pug" Lund's fumble on the Minnesota 37-yard line. Pitt lost the ball on downs at the 31-yard line. After an exchange of punts, Minnesota took possession on their 44-yard line. Six plays advanced the ball to the Pitt 15-yard line. Halfback Pug Lund threw a shovel pass to end Robert Tenner and he struggled around right end for the game's only touchdown. Gopher guard Bill Bevan added the point after and Minnesota led 7 to 0. Pitt answered with an offensive drive to the Minnesota 24-yard line but lost the ball on downs. Late in the second period the Panthers gained possession on their 33-yard line. Howard O'Dell completed a pass to Harvey Rooker for a gain of 47 yards to the Gopher 20-yard line. Pitt rushed the ball to the 4-yard line. On third down Mike Sebastian fumbled, but recovered on the 13-yard line. Isadore Weinstock booted a field goal and Pitt was on the scoreboard. Halftime score: Minnesota 7 to Pitt 3. The Minnesota offense advanced to the Pitt 26-yard line in the third quarter but the Panthers intercepted Lund's pass to end the drive. The remainder of the game was a punting duel as neither offense was able to sustain a drive. The Panthers lost their first regular season game since the October 24, 1931 Notre Dame game. Minnesota finished the season undefeated with a 4–0–4 record.

The Panthers earned 8 first downs and gained 230 yards from scrimmage, but they fumbled 6 times and had 3 passes intercepted. The Gophers earned 6 first downs and gained 162 yards. They fumbled twice and had 2 passes intercepted.

Coach Sutherland lamented: "My team showed me a new kind of fumbling and they came at critical moments to wreck our chances of victory. Naturally, I am a bit disappointed over the defeat, but it's no disgrace to lose to a team like Minnesota." Coach Bierman was elated: "The boys are showing steady improvement and I am pleased with the game they played in defeating Pittsburgh. When they whipped Pitt they defeated a really good team."

The Pitt starting lineup for the game against Minnesota was Harvey Rooker (left end), Robert Hoel (left tackle), Charles Hartwig (left guard), Nick Kliskey (center), Tarciscio Onder (right guard), Frank Walton (right tackle), Joseph Skladany (right end), Miller Munjas (quarterback), Howard O'Dell (left halfback), Mike Sebastian (right halfback) and Henry Weisenbaugh (fullback). Substitutes appearing in the game for Pitt were John Meredith, Ken Ormiston, George Shotwell, Frank Kutz, Robert Hogan, Richard Matesic and Isadore Weinstock.

Scoring summary

Quarter	Time	Drive			Team	Scoring information	Score	
Quarter	Time	Plays	Yards	TOP	Team	Scoring information	Pittsburgh	Minnesota
1		7	54		Minnesota	Robert Tenner 14-yard touchdown reception from Francis Lund, Bill Bevan kick good	0	7
2		8	54		Pittsburgh	20-yard field goal by Isadore Weinstock	3	7
"TOP" = time of possession. For other American football terms, see Glossary of American football.							3	7

=== At Notre Dame ===
Week 5: Pitt at Notre Dame

Team	1	2	3	4	Total
• Pitt	0	14	0	0	14
Notre Dame	0	0	0	0	0

- Date: October 28, 1933
- Location: Notre Dame Stadium
  Notre Dame, IN
- Game start: 2:00 p.m.
- Game attendance: 25,000
- Game weather: clear and cold
- Referee: W. H. Friesell (Princeton)

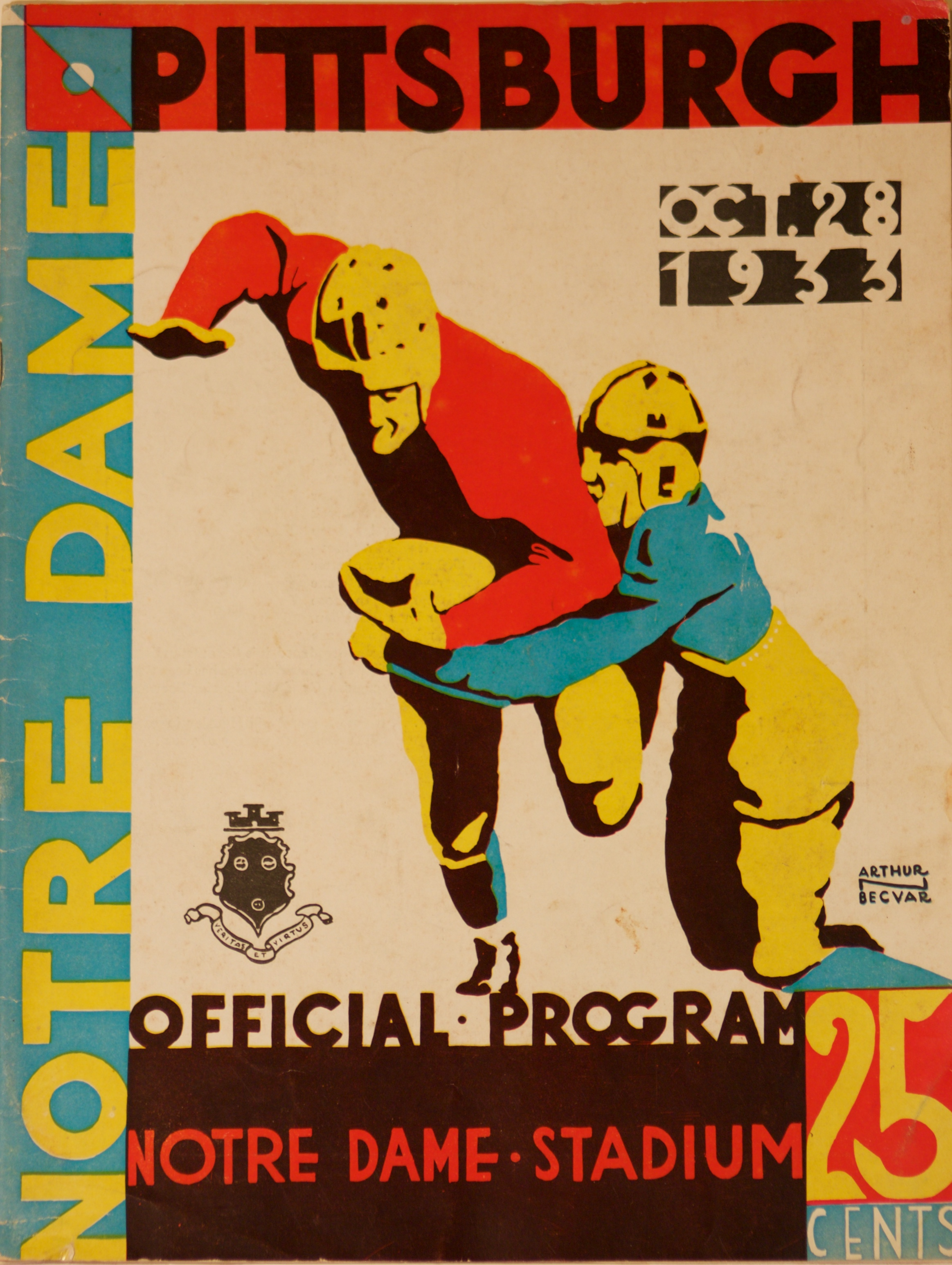
Program for the October 28, 1933 Pitt versus Notre Dame football game

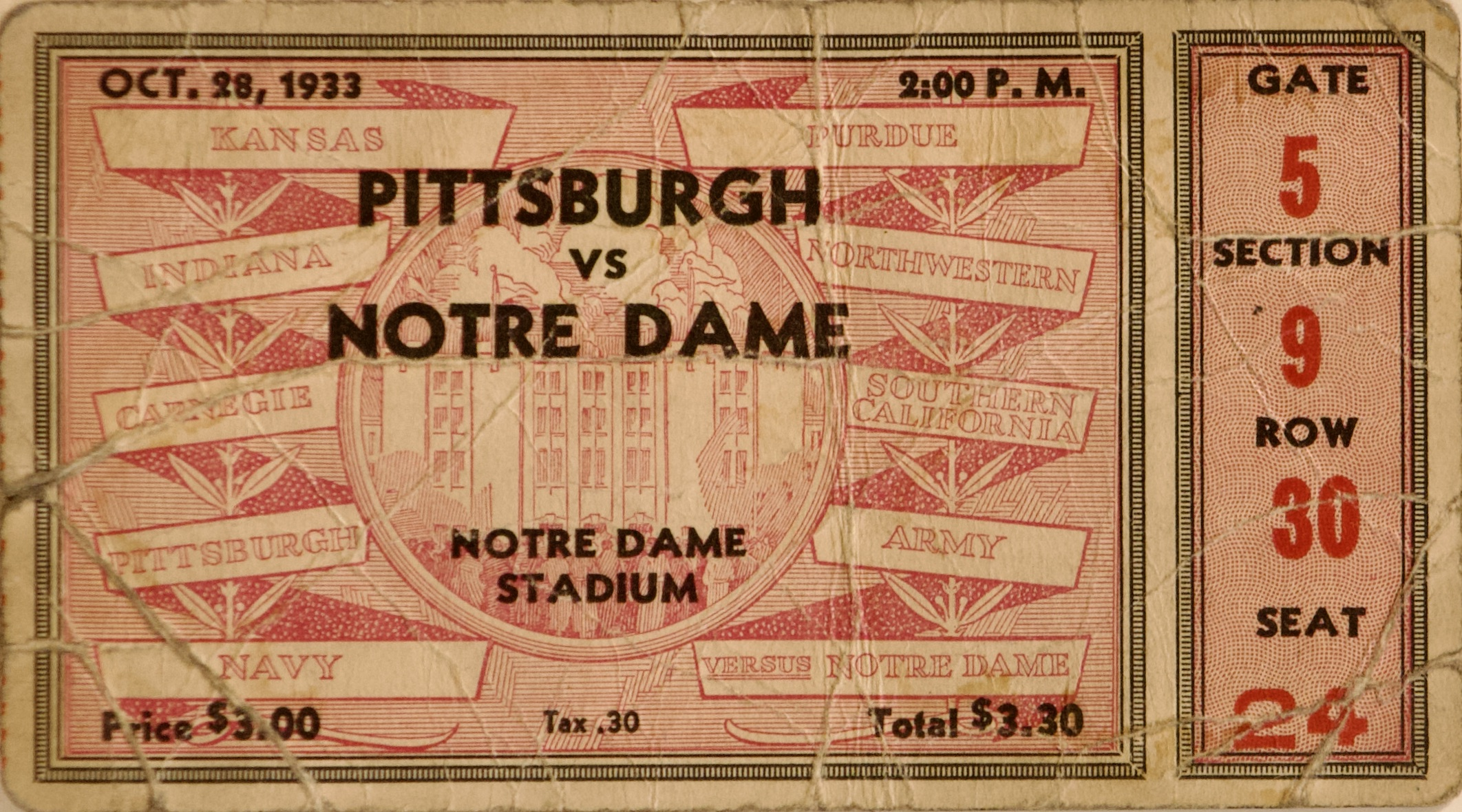
Ticket stub for October 28, 1933 Notre Dame versus Pitt football game

October 28, the Panther squad played their last road game of the season in South Bend, IN against the Fighting Irish of Notre Dame. Notre Dame led the all-time series 4–1–1. Third-year coach Hunk Anderson's eleven wanted revenge for the 12 to 0 loss to the Panthers in 1932. The Irish compiled a 1–1–1 record by playing a scoreless tie with Kansas, beating Indiana (12 to 2) and losing the previous week at Pitt Stadium to Carnegie Tech (7 to 0). After losing to Carnegie Tech, Anderson rearranged the lineup and started five sophomores. The most notable change was Ken Stilley replacing 2-time All-American Ed Kraus at left tackle. Coach Anderson told the Sun-Telegraph: "I don't know how they'll go. They have been looking good, in fact, great, in practice this week, but what they'll do tomorrow is beyond me."

Coach Sutherland had lineup problems of his own. He benched halfback Mike Sebastian to cure him of his propensity to fumble. Richard Matesic earned the start. Isadore Weinstock was back at fullback. George Shotwell replaced the injured Nick Kliskey at center and John Meredith regained his starting left tackle position. Coach Sutherland, ever the psychologist, wrote in his weekly column: "Without a capable center, Pitt hardly can hope to win from the Irish. We're not in the same spot we were a year ago when we beat Notre Dame.The Irish have pointed for us all season. They'll be up for this game as for no other. So I pick Notre Dame."

Jack Ledden of the South Bend Tribune: "A powerhouse eleven from the hills of Pittsburgh used a steamroller attack to grind a game but outclassed Notre Dame eleven into the smooth green turf of the local stadium Saturday afternoon and shatter a 23-year-old tradition by shutting out the Irish, 14–0. As a result of their win the Panthers join Southern California and Carnegie Tech as the only teams of the modern football era to beat Notre Dame twice in a row. The Trojans turned the trick in 1931-32 while Tech won in 1926-28. In addition, the Panthers gain the honor of being the first team to shut out Notre Dame on its home field since 1905 when Wabash turned the trick to the tune of 5–0."

The Panthers dominated the first quarter but failed to score. On their first possession Pitt advanced to the Irish 28-yard line and Irish halfback Nicholas Lukats intercepted a pass from Dick Matesic. After an exchange of punts Notre Dame quarterback Anthony Mazziotti fumbled and Pitt recovered on the Irish 19-yard line. The Pitt offense advanced the ball to the 4-yard line and Matesic threw another interception. Notre Dame was forced to punt and Pitt gained possession on the Irish 49-yard line. Mike Sebastian replaced Matesic at right halfback. The teams traded possessions until late in the half when Notre Dame gained possession on the Pitt 35-yard line. On third down Henry Weisenbaugh intercepted Lukats pass on the Pitt 15-yard line. On third down Sebastian broke through the center of the line and was ably escorted by Howard O'Dell and Weisenbaugh 76 yards for the touchdown. Tarciscio Onder added the extra point and the Panthers led 7 to 0. Notre Dame put the ball in play and on second down Pitt guard Ken Ormiston intercepted Andy Pilney's pass on the Irish 38-yard line. Three plays later Weisenbaugh carried the ball through center from the 3-yard line for the score. Weisenbaugh booted the point after and the scoring for the day was complete. Pitt 14 to Notre Dame 0. The Panthers advanced the ball deep into Notre Dame territory on several occasions in the second half, but lost the ball on fumbles and interceptions. The Irish advanced the ball to the Pitt 8-yard line late in the second half but lost the ball on another interception.

The Panthers totaled 274 yards and 13 first downs compared to 193 yards and 7 first downs for the Irish. The Pitt offense fumbled twice and threw 3 interceptions, while their defense recovered 1 fumble and intercepted 5 passes.

Notre Dame finished the season with a 3–5–1 record. This was the first time in their football history (1899-1933) that they finished a season with a losing record.

The Pitt lineup for the game against Notre Dame was Harvey Rooker (left end), John Meredith (left tackle), Charles Hartwig (left guard), George Shotwell (center), Tarciscio(right guard), Frank Walton (right tackle), Joseph Skladany (right end), Miller Munjas (quarterback), Howard O'Dell (left halfback), Richard Matesic (right halfback) and Isadore Weinstock (fullback). Substitutes appearing in the game for Pitt were Robert Timmons, Robert Hoel, Ken Ormiston, Frank Kutz, Stanley Olejnicsak, Bob Hogan, Hub Randour, Mike Sebastian, Leon Shedlosky and Henry Weisenbaugh.

Scoring summary

Quarter	Time	Drive			Team	Scoring information	Score	
Quarter	Time	Plays	Yards	TOP	Team	Scoring information	Pittsburgh	Minnesota
2		3	85		Pittsburgh	Mike Sebastian 76-yard touchdown run, Tarciscio Onder kick good	7	0
2		4	38		Pittsburgh	Henry Weisenbaugh 3-yard touchdown run, Weisenbaugh kick good	14	0
"TOP" = time of possession. For other American football terms, see Glossary of American football.							14	0

=== Centre ===
Week 6: Centre at Pitt

Team	1	2	3	4	Total
Centre	0	0	0	0	0
• Pitt	0	13	18	6	37

- Date: November 4, 1933
- Location: Pitt Stadium
  Pittsburgh, PA
- Game start: 2:00 p.m.
- Game attendance: 10,000
- Game weather: warm
- Referee: Russ B. Goodwin (W. & J.)

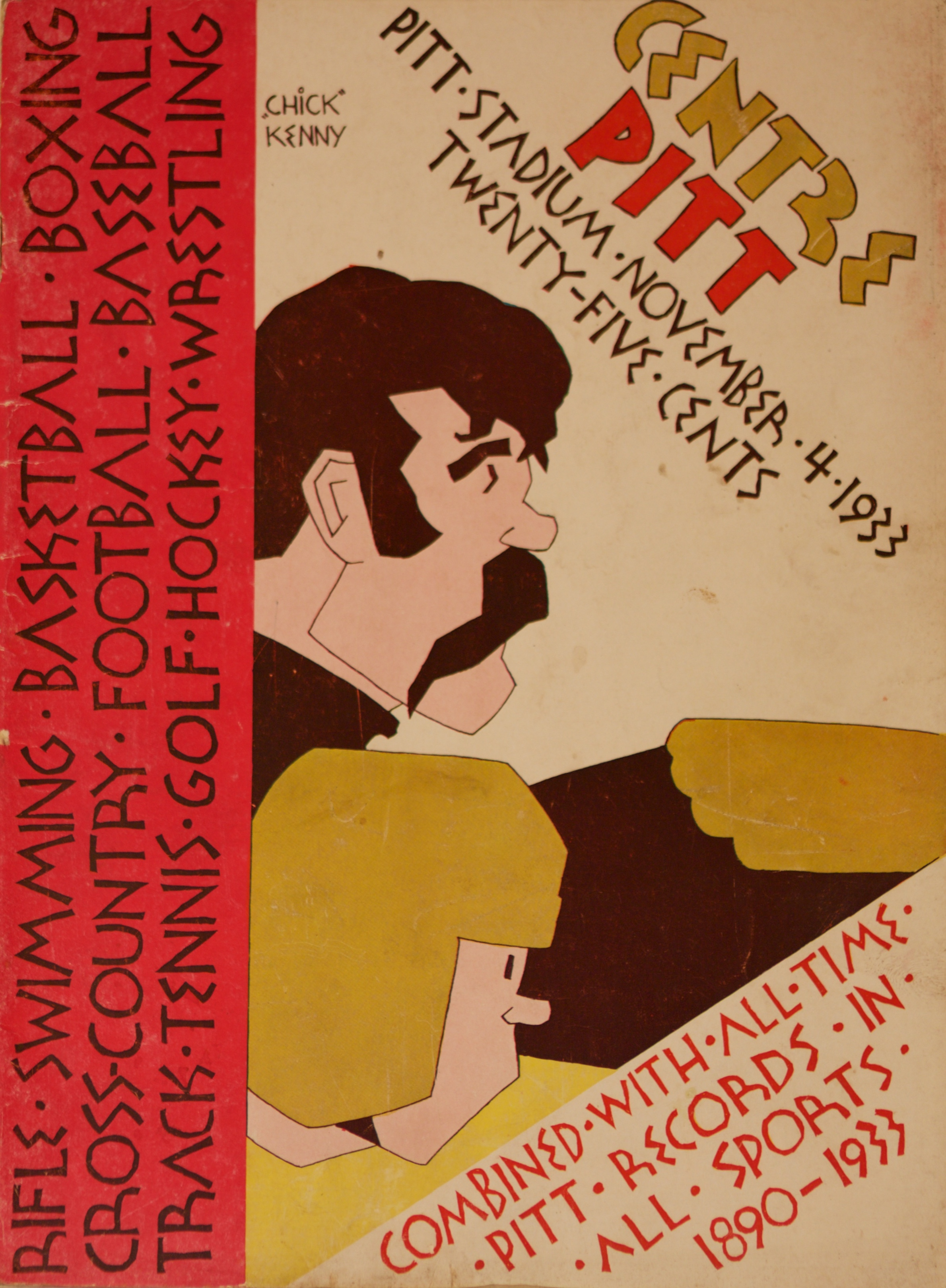
Program for the November 4, 1933 Pitt versus Centre College game

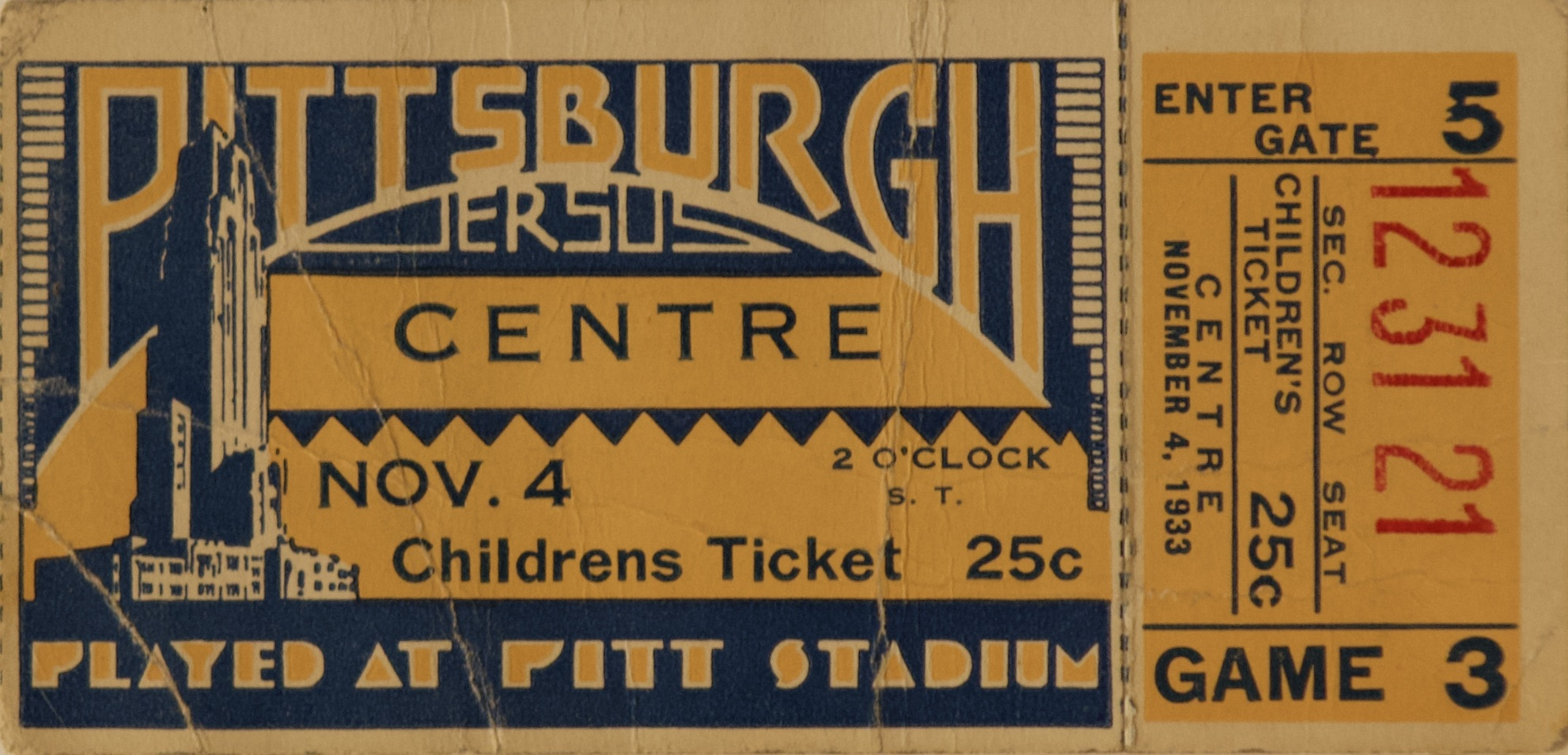
Ticket stub for the November 4, 1933 Pitt versus Centre College football game

On November 4, the Panthers welcomed coach Ed Kubale and his Centre College Praying Colonels from Danville, Kentucky to Pitt Stadium. Coach Kubale played center for the Colonels from 1920 to 1923. In 1929, he returned to Centre as football, basketball and track coach, in addition to athletic director. His squad arrived with a 3–2 record. They won their first two games, then lost to Boston College 6–0 and Furman 7–6 before upsetting Xavier 7–0.

Coach Sutherland decided to start his second team. Early first period Centre end Charles Barksdale's punting allowed the Colonels to gain possession on the Pitt 32-yard line. Two pass plays advanced the ball to the Pitt 7-yard line. The Pitt defense stiffened and forced a missed field goal attempt by Barksdale from the 15-yard line. The first quarter ended scoreless. Sutherland inserted the first stringers into the game and the rout was on. Pitt gained possession on their 39-yard line and engineered a 10-play 61-yard drive. Howard O'Dell fumbled the ball across the goal line and Pitt tackle John Meredith fell on it for the touchdown. Centre answered with a drive to the Pitt 22-yard line, but Tarciscio Onder intercepted a pass and the Pitt offense went to work from their 27-yard line. They covered the 73 yards in 11 plays. Henry Weisenbaugh scored on a fake reverse play from the 15-yard line. Tarciscio Onder booted the only successful extra point of the game to make the halftime score Pitt 13 to Centre 0. Pitt scored three touchdowns in the third quarter. The passing combo of Dick Matesic to Mike Nicksick accounted for two tallies, with a 15-yard touchdown scamper by Matesic sandwiched in between. In the final frame Pitt sub Leslie Wilkins intercepted an errant Centre pass and ran it to the Colonels 8-yard line. Leonard Rector ran the final yard for the score. The Panthers sent the Colonels home with a 37–0 defeat. The Colonels finished the season with a 7–3 record.

The Panthers logged 21 first downs and accumulated 529 total yards to 6 first downs and 99 total yards by Centre. Each team intercepted 4 passes. Pitt turned the ball over 3 times on fumbles. They fumbled a total of 10 times, but were able to recover 7.

The Pitt starting lineup for the game against Centre was Robert Timmons (left end), Robert Hoel (left tackle), Ken Ormiston (left guard), George Shotwell (center), Tarciscio Onder (right guard), Stanley Olejnicsak (right tackle), Vincent Sites (right end), Bob Hogan (quarterback), Hub Randour (left halfback), Leon Shedlosky (right halfback) and Isadore Weinstock (fullback). Substitutes appearing in the game for Pitt were Harvey Rooker, Louis Wojcihovski, John Meredith, John Love, Charles Hartwig, Leon Wohlgemuth, Leslie Wilkins, Charles Gongloff, Frank Tiernan, Frank Walton, Arthur Detzel, Joseph Skladany, Karl Seiffert, Verne Baxter, Miller Munjas, Walter Balasia, Howard O'Dell, Joseph Troglione, Mike Sebastian, Dick Matesic, Arthur Ruff, Henry Weisenbaugh, Leonard Rector and Howard Gelini.

Scoring summary

Quarter	Time	Drive			Team	Scoring information	Score	
Quarter	Time	Plays	Yards	TOP	Team	Scoring information	Centre	Pittsburgh
2		10	61		Pittsburgh	John Meredith recovered Howard O'Dell's fumble in the end zone, Tarciscio Onder kick no good	0	6
2		11	73		Pittsburgh	Henry Weisenbaugh 15-yard touchdown run, Onder kick good	0	13
3		3	81		Pittsburgh	Mike Nicksick 47-yard touchdown reception from Dick Matesic, Isadore Weinstock kick no good	0	19
3		4	42		Pittsburgh	Dick Matesic 15-yard touchdown run, Weinstock kick no good	0	25
3		1	62		Pittsburgh	Mike Nicksick 62-yard touchdown reception from Dick Matesic, Bob Hogan kick no good	0	31
4		4	8		Pittsburgh	Leonard Rector 1-yard touchdown run, John Love kick no good	0	37
"TOP" = time of possession. For other American football terms, see Glossary of American football.							0	37

=== Duquesne ===
Week 7: Duquesne at Pitt

Team	1	2	3	4	Total
Duquesne	0	0	0	0	0
• Pitt	0	0	7	0	7

- Date: November 11, 1933
- Location: Pitt Stadium
  Pittsburgh, PA
- Game start: 2:00 p.m.
- Game attendance: 60,000
- Game weather: rain
- Referee: J. T. Clinton (Yale)

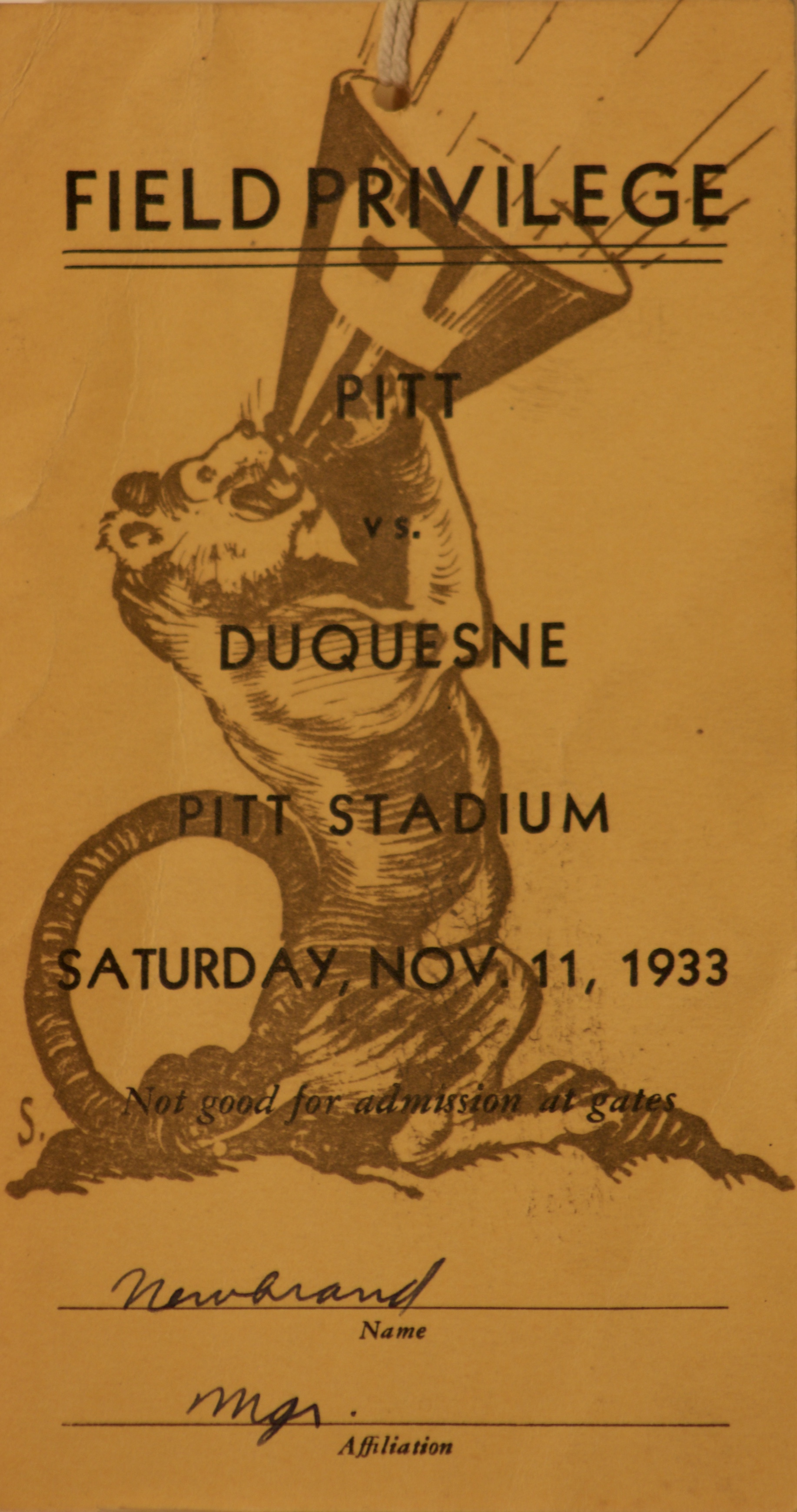
Field pass for the November 11, 1933 Pitt versus Duquesne game

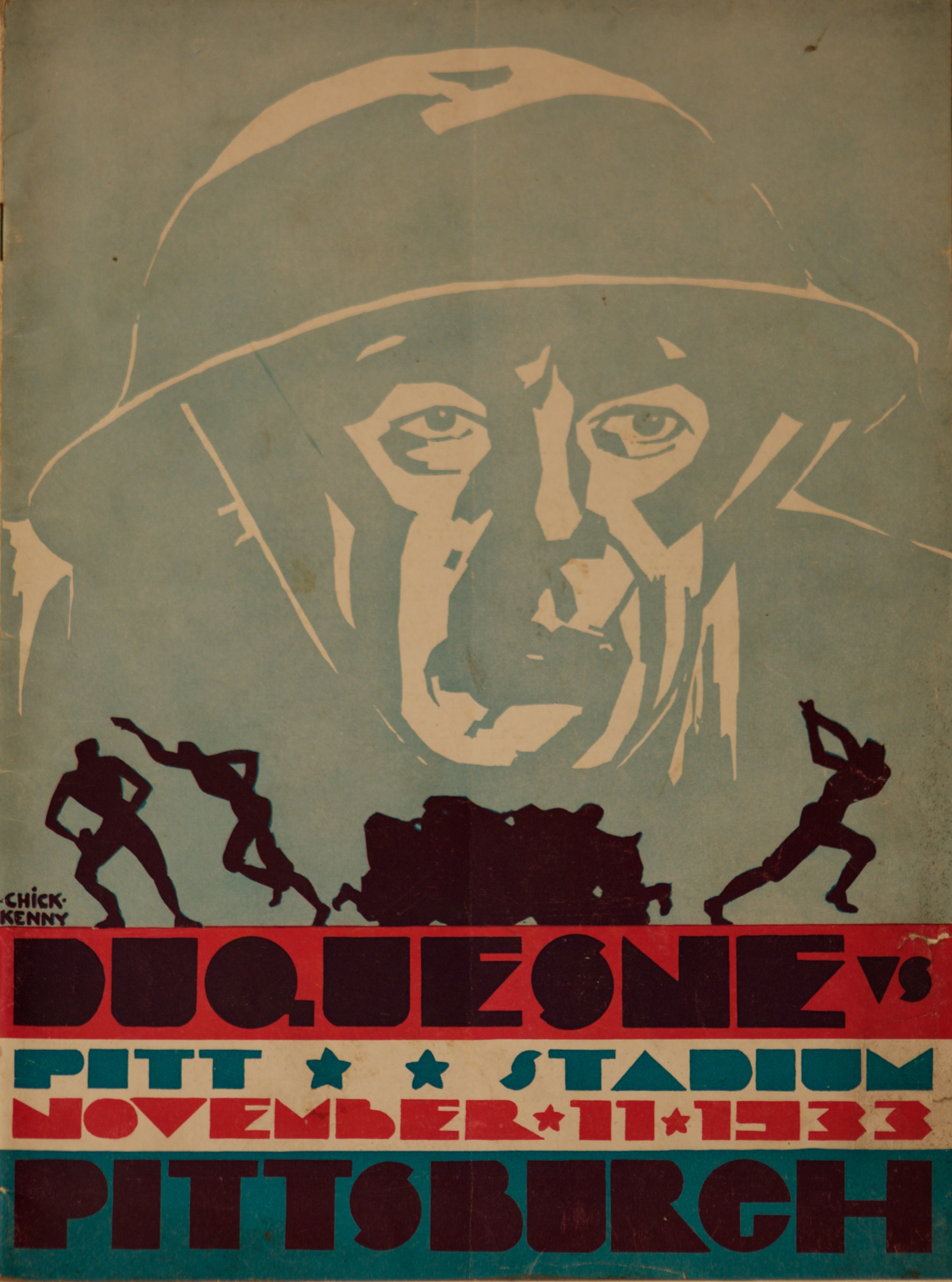
Armistice Day November 11, 1933 football program for the Pitt versus Duquesne game

Pitt's first step to regain the "City Championship" took place on Armistice Day against Elmer Layden's Duquesne Dukes, who were undefeated and still smarting from the 33–0 drubbing administered by the Panthers the previous year. Coach Layden's Dukes finished the 1932 season with a 7–2–1 record and came into this game at 8–0 by outscoring their opposition 147–19. The Dukes were healthy, but their coach was pessimistic in his Pittsburgh Press article: "We hope to make the game interesting. I believe we can do it. Those who attended our game last year saw a worthwhile contest. This year Duquesne has a good team, but Jock Sutherland and Pitt have a great one."

On the Trees Hall practice field, Coach Sutherland was complaining that his team was not taking Duquesne seriously enough. "I know the Dukes are strong–I've seen them. They've come along week after week, beating stronger teams as the campaign went on. And now they're at the end of the season, you might say. Pitt is left, and Pitt is what they've waited for all year." Jock's Panthers came through the Centre game with no injuries and he was able to start his best eleven. His Panthers had not lost to an eastern team since 1928 and had only lost 2 games in November since 1924.

In honor of Armistice Day, the Panthers reserved 10,000 seats for Veterans of Foreign Wars at 50 cents a ticket. For the halftime entertainment, the Shadyside Academy and Arnold Prep School, 9-12 year-old football teams played two 6-minute halves.

60,000 fans sat through 4 quarters of rain and sleet to witness the Panthers put a stop to the Duquesne quest for an unbeaten season by eking out a 7–0 victory. In the opening period, the Panthers advanced the ball to the Duquesne 17-yard line and lost the ball on downs. The second period saw the Duquesne aerial attack penetrate Pitt territory to the 30-yard line. The Pitt pass defense broke up two passes. On third down Armand Niccolai was short on a 43-yard field goal attempt. The half ended scoreless. The Panthers were in Duquesne territory most of the third quarter. A Howard O'Dell to Joseph Skladany pass play took the ball to the Dukes 30-yard line. Pitt lost the ball on downs. Duke halfback Art Strutt fumbled and Pitt recovered on the Duquesne 26-yard line. O'Dell and Isadore Weinstock rushed the ball to the 6-yard line. The Duquesne defense held and took possession on downs. Duquesne fullback Silvio Zaninelli punted out of danger and the Pitt offense had the ball on the Dukes 34-yard line. Weinstock attempted a 43-yard field goal that was short and downed on the 3-yard line. Duquesne punted and Pitt regained possession on the Dukes 35-yard line. After an offsides penalty, O'Dell completed a 23-yard pass to Dick Matesic for a first down on the 17-yard line. Four plays later Weinstock ran off tackle from the 8-yard line for the game's only touchdown. Weinstock was good on the point after. In the fourth quarter a bad pass from center resulted in a Duquesne possession on the Pitt 24-yard line. The Panther defense held and regained possession on their 30-yard line. The remainder of the game was played in Duquesne territory. Final score: Pitt 7 to Duquesne 0.

Duquesne finished the regular season with a 9–1 record. They were invited to play Miami (FL) in the second Festival of Palms Bowl game, which they won handily 33–7 to complete a 10–1 season. The fans of Pittsburgh had to wait for a rematch, since the Panthers replaced Duquesne with Southern Cal on their schedule for the 1934 and 1935 seasons.

Coach Sutherland praised the Dukes: "Duquesne proved today they belong up near the top in football. To be frank, I wasn't surprised with the close result. I knew all along that we would have to show at our best and I think all who saw the game will share that view. It was a hard game and the Dukes were sportsmen all the way." Coach Layden added: "Certainly we would have been jubilant had we beaten the great Pitt team, but I figured they were a little better than us. It was a fine game of football and I want to congratulate the victors. Also, I feel that our boys acquitted themselves very creditably."

The Panther starting lineup for the game against Duquesne was Harvey Rooker (left end), John Meredith (left tackle), Charles Hartwig (left guard), George Shotwell (center), Tarciscio Onder (right guard), Frank Walton (right tackle), Joseph Skladany (right end), Bob Hogan (quarterback), Howard O'Dell (left halfback), Mike Sebastian (right halfback) and Isadore Weinstock (fullback). Substitute appearing in the game for Pitt were Robert Timmons, Vincent Sites, Ken Ormiston, Frank Kutz, Nick Kliskey, Miller Munjas, Leon Shedlosky, Dick Matesic and Henry Weisenbaugh.

Scoring summary

Quarter	Time	Drive			Team	Scoring information	Score	
Quarter	Time	Plays	Yards	TOP	Team	Scoring information	Duquesne	Pittsburgh
3		6	35		Pittsburgh	Isadore Weinstock 8-yard touchdown run, Weinstock kick good	0	7
"TOP" = time of possession. For other American football terms, see Glossary of American football.							0	7

=== Nebraska ===
Week 8: Nebraska at Pitt

Team	1	2	3	4	Total
Nebraska	0	0	0	0	0
• Pitt	0	0	0	6	6

- Date: November 18, 1933
- Location: Pitt Stadium
  Pittsburgh, PA
- Game start: 2:00 p.m.
- Game attendance: 25,000
- Game weather: cloudy
- Referee: W. G. Crowell (Swarthmore)

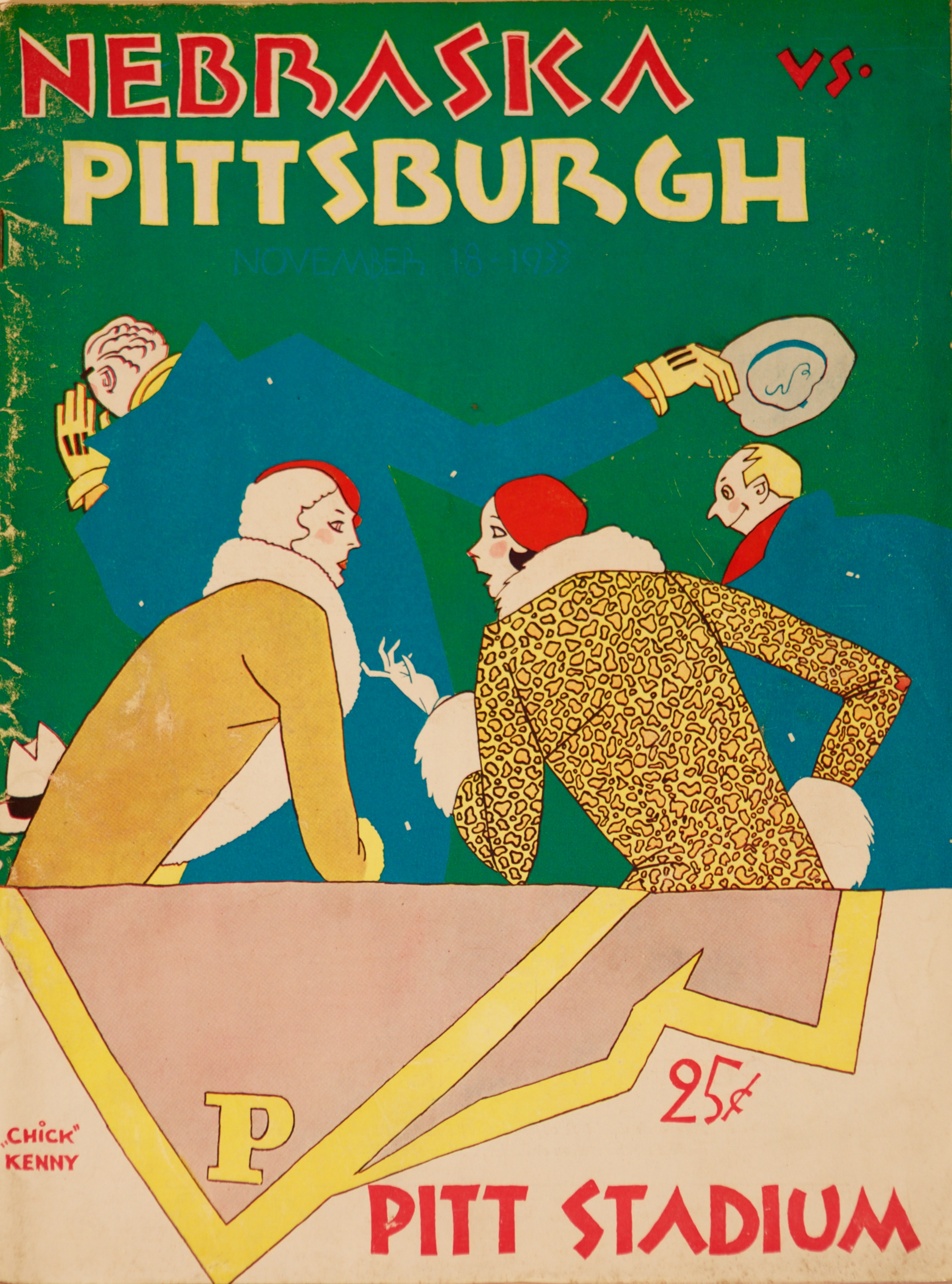
Program for the November 18, 1933 Pitt versus Nebraska football game

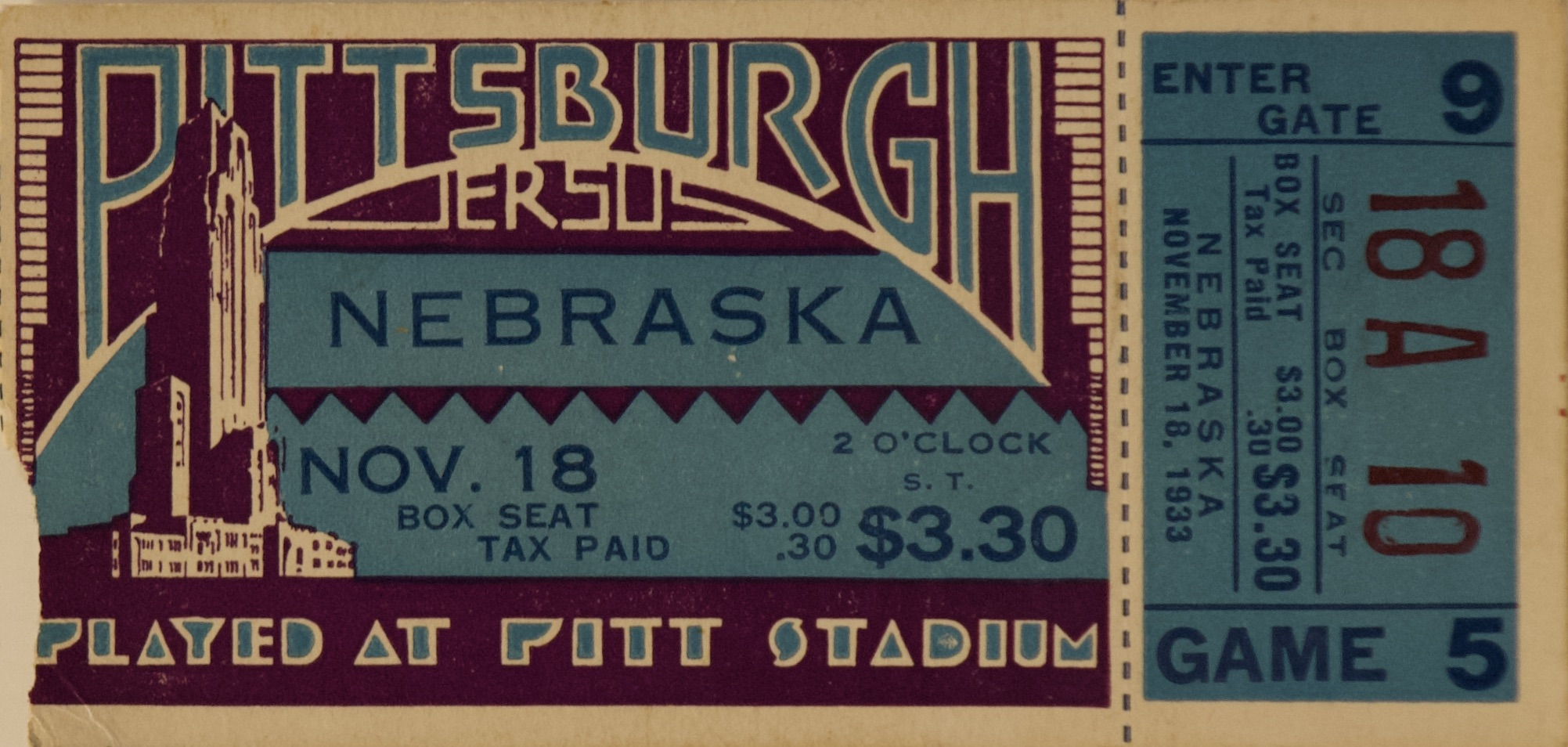
Ticket stub for November 18, 1933 Pitt versus Nebraska football game

On November 18, Dana Bible's Nebraska Cornhuskers, unbeaten champions of the Big Six Conference, came east to face the Panthers. In their initial 1921 matchup Nebraska beat Pitt at Forbes Field. The teams met six times since, and Pitt did not lose again, as the series stood at 3–1–3. The three scoreless tie games were played in Lincoln. The Cornhuskers were 6–0 on the season and had outscored their opposition 109–7. The team was led by consensus All-American fullback George Sauer. The Huskers had a veteran lineup with nine seniors in the starting lineup.

Nebraska was hoping to secure an invitation to the Rose Bowl or the proposed national championship game in Chicago. Coach Bible commented: "We have too much at stake today and next Saturday against Iowa to even think of the Tournament of Roses or the Chicago national championship game. If we get by Pitt today and Iowa next week we'll have plenty of time to consider any invitations that may come to us for post-season games."

Coach Sutherland announced: "The team is in good shape and we'll give Nebraska a football game. If the boys play the football of which they are capable, of which they know, we should win, but it will be a fight."

Under a cloud-filled sky in front of only 20,000 fans, the Pitt Panthers upset the Nebraska Cornhuskers' championship dream by scoring a fourth quarter touchdown to win a hard fought game 6 to 0. In the first quarter Nebraska penetrated Pitt territory twice, but were stymied by an interception and loss of downs. In the second quarter, the Huskers had first down on the Pitt 25-yard line, but Tarciscio Onder intercepted a George Sauer pass. Late in the half, Pitt gained possession on the Nebraska 26-yard line. Nebraska was offside on first down. On first and five, Mike Sebastian scampered 10 yards for a first down on the 11-yard line. Sebastian carried three times to the 3-yard line. He was injured and carried from the field. When play resumed, the officials were confused and gave the ball to Nebraska on downs. No one noticed except the writers in the press box, and the scoreless half ended two plays later. On their first possession of the second half the Pitt offense advanced the ball to the Nebraska 3-yard line, but lost the ball on downs. After an exchange of possessions the Panthers drove to the Husker 24-yard line. Nebraska's defense stiffened and Isadore Weinstock missed a 30-yard field goal. Early in the fourth quarter Henry Weisenbaugh gained 30 yards to the Husker 10-yard line. Two Weisenbaugh plunges moved the ball to the 5-yard line. On third down Leon Shedlosky gained 2-yards On fourth down Shedlosky passed to Mike Nicksick for the winning touchdown. Weinstock missed the point after. The remainder of the game was played in Nebraska territory.

Pitt gained 276 yards from scrimmage, added 78 yards through the air and totaled 17 first downs. Nebraska only managed 43 yards from scrimmage, 80 yards by passing and earned 7 first downs. John Bentley noted: "The Huskers had the ball on only 42 plays while Pittsburgh ran off a total of 83, almost twice as many. That old theory is still good. If you can't get hold of the ball you can't score with it."

The Nebraska contingent went home disappointed. However, the team was greeted 9 a.m. Monday morning at the train station by 2,000 cheering students, who "hailed the Cornhuskers for the gallant fight they made against a great Pittsburgh team Saturday." Nebraska beat Iowa and Oregon State in their final two games to finish their season with an 8–1 record.

The Pitt starting lineup for the game against Nebraska was Robert Timmons (left end), John Meredith (left tackle), Charles Hartwig (left guard), George Shotwell (center), Tarciscio Onder (right guard), Frank Walton (right tackle), Joseph Skladany (right end), Bob Hogan (quarterback), Howard O'Dell (left halfback), Mike Sebastian (right halfback) and Isadore Weinstock (fullback). Substitutes appearing in the game for Pitt were Harvey Rooker, Robert Hoel, Ken Ormiston, Nick Kliskey, Frank Kutz, Miller Munjas, Mike Nicksick, Dick Matesic, Leon Shedlosky and Henry Weisenbaugh.

After Pitt's victory, John W. Murray the national championship game representative from Chicago wanted Pitt to accept an invitation. W. Don Harrison, Pitt director of athletics, declined the offer. He stated: "I wired the Chicago officials a week ago that we would not consider any post-season game. I particularly don't like the Chicago arrangement, for I understand they want to keep 80 per cent of the gross receipts for Chicago charity. The contending teams get only 10 per cent apiece for their local charities."

Scoring summary

Quarter	Time	Drive			Team	Scoring information	Score	
Quarter	Time	Plays	Yards	TOP	Team	Scoring information	Nebraska	Pittsburgh
4		6	42		Pittsburgh	Mike Nicksick 3-yard touchdown reception from Leon Shedlosky, Isadore Weinstock kick no good	0	6
"TOP" = time of possession. For other American football terms, see Glossary of American football.							0	6

=== Carnegie Tech ===
Week 9: Carnegie Tech at Pitt

Team	1	2	3	4	Total
Carnegie Tech	0	0	0	0	0
• Pitt	7	0	2	7	16

- Date: November 30, 1933
- Location: Pitt Stadium
  Pittsburgh, PA
- Game start: 2:00 p.m.
- Game attendance: 42,000
- Game weather: clear and cool
- Referee: R. Thorp (De LaSalle)

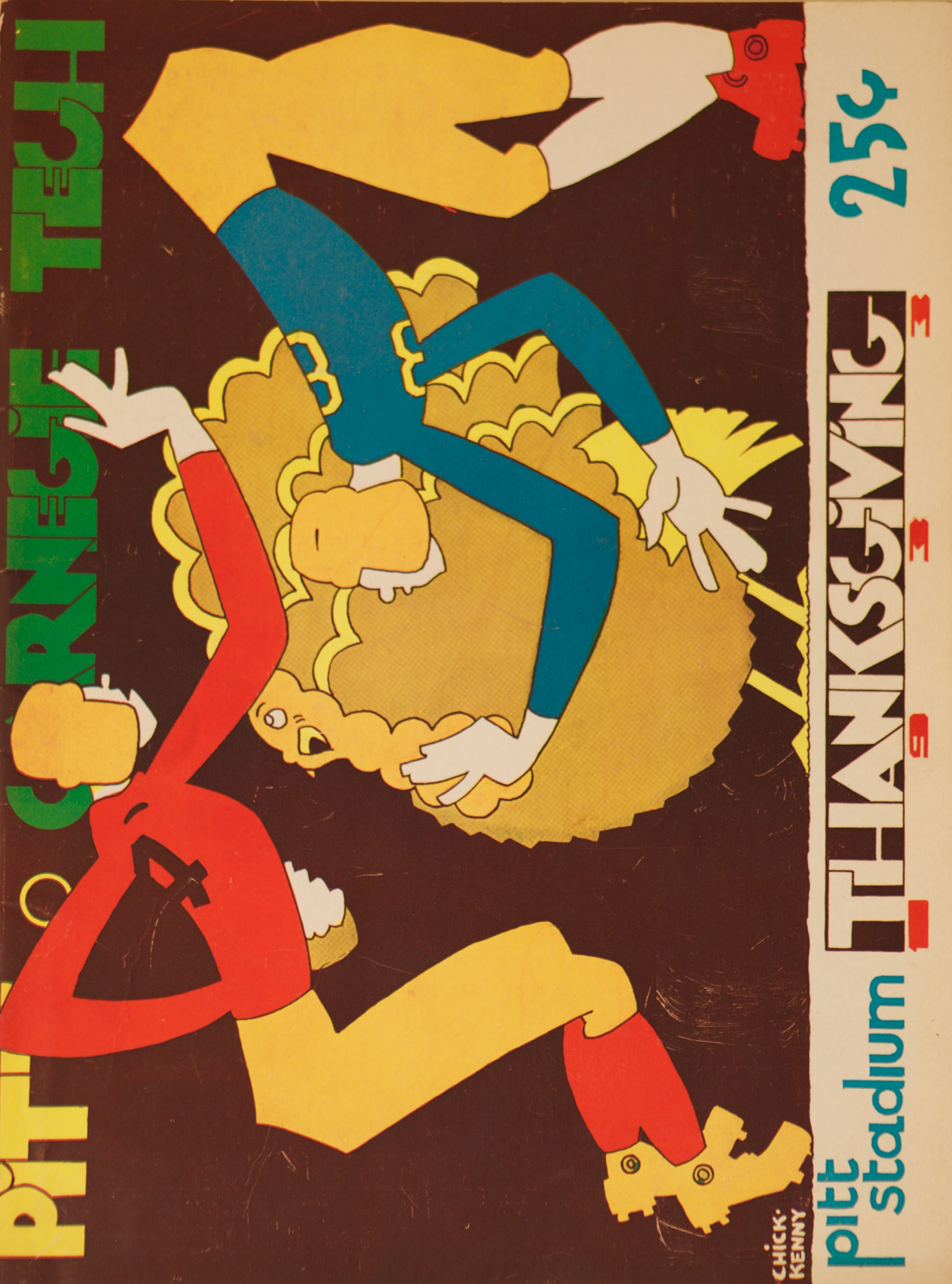
Program for the November 30, 1933 Pitt versus Carnegie Tech football game

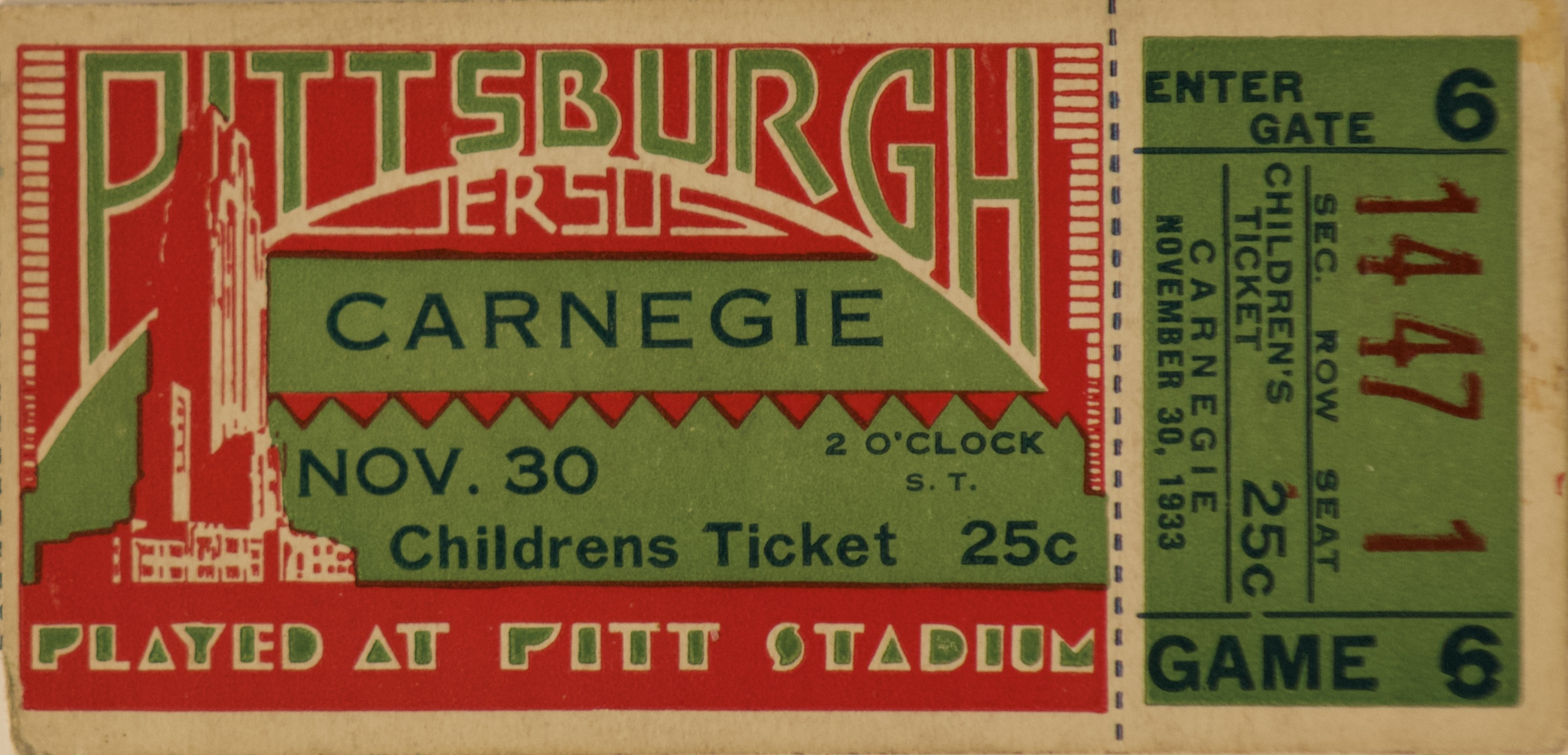
Ticket stub for the November 30, 1933 Pitt versus Carnegie Tech football game

On Thanksgiving Day, Pitt ended its season with the showdown against Carnegie Tech in the twentieth "City Championship" game. Walter Steffen resigned as Tech coach at the end of the 1932 season and the Tartans hired their former All-America quarterback Howard Harpster. The Tartans came into the game with a 4–2–2 record. The highlight of their season was a 7 to 0 victory over Notre Dame at Pitt Stadium. Their defense was their strength. They held all opponents scoreless except for the losses to Purdue (17–7) and NYU (7–0).

Both coaches were pessimistic about their chances. Harpster wrote in the Sun-Telegraph: "We hold little or no hope of holding the Panthers even, but we have attempted to rally the players for this final game to give Pitt and the spectators a good battle. Our players have come through a grueling season, and, regardless of tomorrow's outcome, have more than fulfilled our expectations. If the Tech team can hold Pitt to two or three touchdowns, we will consider the tough job well done."

Even though Pitt had won four straight in the series, Coach Sutherland cautioned: "Frankly, I can't see where Pitt has an edge. Carnegie Tech is a far better team than any we have met this season...Tech obviously is a better team than a year ago. It is questionable whether Pitt is as strong. Yet we defeated Tech only 6 to 0 last year, and then after an out-and-out break...I refuse to predict a winner."

On a beautiful day in Pittsburgh, in front of 42,000 fans, the Panthers made it five in a row over the Tartans with a hard-fought 16 to 0 win. Early in the game Tech guard Bernard Burzio blocked Bob Hogan's punt and Tech gained possession on the Pitt 17-yard line. The Pitt defense held and Tech captain Colin Stewart missed wide right on a 27-yard field goal. Tech regained possession when Mike Sebastian fumbled the ball on the Pitt 29-yard line. The Panther defense held and Stewart missed a 42-yard field goal. The Tartans did not threaten to score again. Late in the first period the Panthers gained possession at midfield. Henry Weisenbaugh gained 33-yards in three carries. Sebastian advanced the ball to the 13-yard line but then Howard O'Dell lost a yard. On third and seven, O'Dell threw a pass to Bob Hogan for the touchdown. This was senior quarterback Hogan's first and last touchdown as a Panther. Tarciscio Onder booted the point after and Pitt led at halftime 7 to 0. In the third quarter Frank Walton broke through the Tartan line and tackled Tech quarterback Willie Spisak in the end zone for a safety. Pitt led 9 to 0 at the end of third quarter. Isadore Weinstock scored the last Pitt touchdown. He intercepted a Tech pass on their 40-yard line and returned it to the 20-yard line. He gained 13-yards on first down. Tech was offside and the ball placed on the two. Weinstock scored two plays later and added the point after to make the final read: Pitt 16 to Tech 0.

The Pitt starting lineup for the game against Carnegie Tech was Robert Timmons (left end), John Meredith (left tackle), Charles Hartwig (left guard), George Shotwell (center), Tarciscio Onder (right guard), Frank Walton (right tackle), Joseph Skladany (right end), Bob Hogan (quarterback), Howard O'Dell (left halfback), Mike Sebastian (right halfback) and Henry Weisenbaugh (fullback). Substitutes appearing in the game for Pitt were Harvey Rooker, Robert Hoel, Stanley Olejnicsak, Arthur Detzel, Ken Ormiston, Nick Kliskey, Frank Kutz, John Love, Verne Baxter, Miller Munjas, Mike Nicksick, Leon Shedlosky, Dick Matesic and Isadore Weinstock.

Scoring summary

Quarter	Time	Drive			Team	Scoring information	Score	
Quarter	Time	Plays	Yards	TOP	Team	Scoring information	Carnegie Tech	Pittsburgh
1		5	49		Pittsburgh	Bob Hogan 9-yard touchdown reception from Howard O'Dell, Tarciscio Onder kick good	0	7
3		1			Pittsburgh	Frank Walton tackled Tech halfback Steve Terebus in the end zone for a safety	0	9
4		3	19		Pittsburgh	Isadore Weinstock 3-yard touchdown run, Weinstock kick good	0	16
"TOP" = time of possession. For other American football terms, see Glossary of American football.							0	16

== Individual scoring summary ==
1933 Pittsburgh Panthers scoring summary
Player	Touchdowns	Extra points	Field goals	Safety	Points
Henry A. Weisenbaugh	5	1	0	0	31
Isadore Weinstock	3	5	2	0	29
Michael Nicksick	3	0	0	0	18
John Meredith	2	0	0	0	12
Howard O'Dell	2	0	0	0	12
Leonard Rector	1	1	0	0	7
Mike Sebastian	1	0	0	0	6
Dick Matesic	1	0	0	0	6
Leon Shedlosky	1	0	0	0	6
Hub Randour	1	0	0	0	6
Robert Hogan	1	0	0	0	6
Tarciscio Onder	0	6	0	0	6
Frank Walton	0	0	0	1	2
Totals	21	13	2	1	147

== Postseason ==
The Panthers made the short list of possible Rose Bowl participants, but the committee chose Columbia University.

Joseph Skladany, Frank Walton and Mike Sebastian were chosen to participate on New Year's Day in the Shriner's Hospital East-West game in Kezar Stadium at San Francisco.

The freshman team under the tutelage of Roscoe Gougler finished the season with a 3–1 record. The freshies beat Wyoming Seminary (13–7), West Virginia (26–19) and the Kiski School (6–3). They lost their final game to the Carnegie Tech freshmen (12–6).

On January 18, Chancellor John G. Bowman honored the football team with a banquet at the Pittsburgh Athletic Association. Coach Sutherland's contract was extended indefinitely. Guard Charles Hartwig was appointed captain of the varsity for the 1934 season. The following players received their letters: Charles Hartwig, Joseph Skladany, Robert Timmons, Harvey Rooker, Tarciscio Onder, Ken Ormiston, Frank Kutz, Michael Sebastian, Howard O'Dell, Hubert Randour, Leon Shedlosky, Mike Nicksick, Robert Hogan, Miller Munjas, Henry Weisenbaugh, Isadore Weinstock, Frank Walton, John Meredith, Robert Hoel, Richard Matesic. Managers Leroy Lewis and Christy Jones also were awarded letters.

Assistant coach Andy Gustafson accepted an assistant coaching position at Dartmouth under Colonel Red Blaik. Bill Kern was promoted to fill his position. Eddie Baker became backfield coach and Howard O'Dell was hired as his assistant.
