= 1933 Kansas State Wildcats football team =

American college football season

1933 Kansas State Wildcats football
- Conference: Big Six Conference
- Record: 6–2–1 (4–1 Big 6)
- Head coach: Bo McMillin (6th season)
- Home stadium: Memorial Stadium

1933 Big Six Conference football standings
	Conf.					Overall
Team	W		L		T	W		L		T
No. 2 Nebraska $	5	–	0	–	0	8	–	1	–	0
Kansas State	4	–	1	–	0	6	–	2	–	1
Oklahoma	3	–	2	–	0	4	–	4	–	1
Kansas	2	–	3	–	0	5	–	4	–	1
Iowa State	1	–	4	–	0	3	–	5	–	1
Missouri	0	–	5	–	0	1	–	8	–	0
$ – Conference champion; Rankings from Dickinson System

The 1933 Kansas State Wildcats football team represented Kansas State University in the 1933 college football season. The 1933 team finished 6–2–1 overall and they finished in second place in the Big Six Conference with a 4–1 conference record. The Kansas State team was led by future Hall-of-Fame coach Bo McMillin in his sixth and final season. The Wildcats played their home games in Memorial Stadium. The Wildcats scored 105 points and gave up 29 points.

== Schedule ==
Date	Opponent	Site	Result	Attendance	Source
September 30	Kansas State Teachers*	Memorial Stadium; Manhattan, KS	W 25–0	4,000	
October 6	at Saint Louis*	Walsh Stadium; St. Louis, MO	W 20–14		
October 14	at Missouri	Memorial Stadium; Columbia, MO	W 33–0		
October 21	Nebraska^{†}	Memorial Stadium; Manhattan, KS (rivalry)	L 0–9	15,138	
October 28	at Kansas	Memorial Stadium; Lawrence, KS (rivalry)	W 6–0		
November 4	at Michigan State*	College Field; East Lansing, MI	T 0–0		
November 11	at Iowa State	State Field; Ames, IA (rivalry)	W 7–0		
November 18	Oklahoma	Memorial Stadium; Manhattan, KS	W 14–0	10,000	
November 30	at Texas Tech*	Tech Field; Lubbock, TX	L 0–6	7,500	
*Non-conference game; ^{†}Homecoming
