= 1933 Nebraska Cornhuskers football team =

American college football season

1933 Nebraska Cornhuskers football

Big 6 champion
- Conference: Big Six Conference
- Record: 8–1 (5–0 Big 6)
- Head coach: Dana X. Bible (5th season)
- Home stadium: Memorial Stadium

1933 Big Six Conference football standings
	Conf.					Overall
Team	W		L		T	W		L		T
No. 2 Nebraska $	5	–	0	–	0	8	–	1	–	0
Kansas State	4	–	1	–	0	6	–	2	–	1
Oklahoma	3	–	2	–	0	4	–	4	–	1
Kansas	2	–	3	–	0	5	–	4	–	1
Iowa State	1	–	4	–	0	3	–	5	–	1
Missouri	0	–	5	–	0	1	–	8	–	0
$ – Conference champion; Rankings from Dickinson System

The 1933 Nebraska Cornhuskers football team was an American football team that represented the University of Nebraska in the Big Six Conference during the 1933 college football season. In its fifth season under head coach Dana X. Bible, the team compiled an 8–1 record (5–0 against conference opponents), won the Big Six championship, and outscored opponents by a total of 138 to 19. The team played its home games at Memorial Stadium in Lincoln, Nebraska.

== Before the season ==
Nebraska was coming off of a successful 1932 season. Coach Bible having won his third league championship in four years, and the program had taken four of the last five Big 6 conference titles.

== Schedule ==
Date	Time	Opponent	Site	Result	Attendance	Source
October 7	2:00 p.m.	Texas*	Memorial Stadium; Lincoln, NE	W 26–0	18,000	
October 14	2:00 p.m.	at Iowa State	State Field; Ames, IA (rivalry)	W 20–0	5,200–5,209	
October 21	2:00 p.m.	at Kansas State	Memorial Stadium; Manhattan, KS (rivalry)	W 9–0	15,138	
October 28	2:00 p.m.	Oklahoma	Memorial Stadium; Lincoln, NE (rivalry)	W 16–7	16,507	
November 4	2:00 p.m.	at Missouri	Memorial Stadium; Columbia, MO (rivalry)	W 26–0	5,404	
November 11	2:00 p.m.	Kansas^{†}	Memorial Stadium; Lincoln, NE (rivalry)	W 12–0	28,503	
November 18	1:00 p.m.	at Pittsburgh*	Pitt Stadium; Pittsburgh, PA	L 0–6	20,000	
November 25	2:00 p.m.	Iowa*	Memorial Stadium; Lincoln, NE (rivalry)	W 7–6	32,495	
November 30	2:00 p.m.	Oregon State*	Memorial Stadium; Lincoln, NE	W 22–0	23,092	
*Non-conference game; ^{†}Homecoming; All times are in Central time

== Roster ==
Benson, Robert #26 HB; Bishop, Clair #30 G Boswell, Hubert #23 HB; Cockburn #14 HB; Copple, Leland #39 T DeBus, Warren #43 G Heldt, James #32 G Hubka, Elmer #36 G Hubka, Ladas #16 G Jones, Glenn #15 C Justice, Glenn #31 G Keriakedes, John #50 T Kilbourne, Bruce #27 E LaNoue, Gerald #11 HB; Masterson, Bernard #33 QB; Mead, Everett #34 HB; Mehring, Neal #29 G Meier, Franklin #21 C	Miller, Jack QB; Milne, James #28 E O'Brien, Gail #46 T Parsons, Rollin #19 HB; Penny, Thomas Lee #35 E Pflum, Walter #47 T Reese, Carroll #41 T Roby, John #24 E Sauer, George #25 FB; Scherer, Bernard #44 E Skewes, Glenn #17 FB; Smith, Richard #43 C Thompson, John Russell #48 T Uptegrove, Ed #42 G Williams, John #22 FB; Wilson, Jack #37 E Yelkin, Virgil #12 E

== Coaching staff ==
Name	Title	First year in this position	Years at Nebraska	Alma mater
Dana X. Bible	Head coach	1929	1929–1936	Carson-Newman
Henry Schulte	Lineman Coach	1931	1919–1924, 1931–1937	Michigan
Ed Weir	Freshmen Coach	1929	1926, 1929–1937, 1943	Nebraska
W. Harold Browne	Assistant coach	1930	1930–1940	
McLean		1933	1933–1934	
Deppes		1933	1933	
Clemons		1933	1933	

== Game summaries ==
=== Texas ===
Texas at Nebraska

Team	1	2	Total
Texas			0
• Nebraska			26

- Date: October 7
- Location: Memorial Stadium • Lincoln, Nebraska
- Game attendance: 18,000

Nebraska entirely smashed the Texas Longhorns as these teams met for the first time, delivering a sound shutout defeat that left no doubt as to Nebraska's aspirations for the 1933 season. Not once during the previous 7–1–1 season was coach Bible able to play everyone on the roster, but against Texas on this day the backups began to cycle onto the field in the third quarter. The Cornhuskers outgained the Longhorns 320 to 85, and Texas never got closer than the Nebraska 30-yard line.

=== Iowa State ===
Nebraska at Iowa State

Team	1	2	Total
• Nebraska			20
Iowa State			0

- Date: October 14
- Location: Clyde Williams Field • Ames, Iowa
- Game attendance: 5,209

If the Texas game had been a statement during the previous week, coach Bible's team apparently felt like it needed to be said again, and louder. The Cornhuskers opened the 1933 conference slate by entirely smashing the Cyclones in Ames, in their second consecutive shutout victory. This time, Nebraska outyarded Iowa State 444 to 22, allowing the Cyclones a single first down through the entire game as once again all players on the Cornhusker roster found playing time. Iowa State's futility against Nebraska all time now reached 4–23–1.

=== Kansas State ===
Nebraska at Kansas State

Team	1	2	3	4	Total
• Nebraska	0	0	6	3	9
Kansas State	0	0	0	0	0

- Date: October 21
- Location: Memorial Stadium • Manhattan, Kansas

Nebraska, after rolling over the opposition in the first two games, delivered yet another shutout victory in a contest that was not quite the cakewalk as seen so far this season. Both teams got nowhere in the first half, trading punts and turnovers. Kansas State finally made a serious go at scoring shortly after the half, drawing up to Nebraska's 15-yard line before the Cornhusker defense overpowered their efforts and pushed them backwards 18 yards to deny them a score before taking back possession. Shortly afterward, the Nebraska squad found the end zone, but missed the point after, to go up 6–0. The game still hung in the balance, as a single Wildcat touchdown could win the game if the kick after was good. With less than a minute remaining, Nebraska finally sealed the outcome with a field goal to remain undefeated in conference play. The record of Nebraska domination over Kansas State was further extended, to 16–1–1.

=== Oklahoma ===
Oklahoma at Nebraska

Team	1	2	3	4	Total
Oklahoma	0	0	7	0	7
• Nebraska	6	7	0	3	16

- Date: October 28
- Location: Memorial Stadium • Lincoln, Nebraska

The 1933 game with Oklahoma started with an unexpected twist, when the Cornhuskers kicked off to the Sooners. The ball went over the kick returners and rolled untouched to a stop in the end zone as the Oklahoma players subsequently began to re-form into an offensive formation, while waiting for an official to bring the ball up to the 20-yard line to start the first series. The alert Cornhusker squad realized that the ball was never touched "down", and Hubert Boswell subtly filtered past the Sooner line to rush up and land on the ball in the end zone, handing Nebraska an instant game-opening 6–0 score. After that, the game was an unremarkable affair filled with errors as the teams combined for thirteen fumbles overall, with the lines apparently evenly matched up. Nebraska's other two scores were more than enough to seal the win, though Oklahoma became the first team to score against the Cornhusker defense on the season. Nebraska remained unbeaten in Big 6 play, and stayed ahead of the Sooners at 9–2–2 all time.

=== Missouri ===
Nebraska at Missouri

Team	1	2	Total
• Nebraska			26
Missouri			0

- Date: November 4
- Location: Faurot Field • Columbia, Missouri
- Game weather: Rain

The Cornhuskers got back to their defensive stonewalling ways after allowing the first touchdown of the season against Oklahoma the week before in a 16–7 win, delivering their fourth shutout in the last five games as the Missouri Tigers were humiliated at home in a driving rain. Missouri's efforts were for naught as Nebraska rolled up 403 yards and twenty-three first downs in Columbia, yet again denying the Tigers possession of the Missouri-Nebraska Bell for the sixth year in a row and sending them farther back in the series to 6–18–3.

=== Kansas ===
Kansas at Nebraska

Team	1	2	3	4	Total
Kansas	0	0	0	0	0
• Nebraska	0	6	0	6	12

- Date: November 11
- Location: Memorial Stadium • Lincoln, Nebraska
- Game attendance: 31,000

The Cornhuskers overcame a soft start after the Jayhawks managed to dominate the line in the scoreless first period, and it was a spectacular 82-yard pass reception for a touchdown that marked the turning point in front of the overflow homecoming crowd. Kansas never fully recovered from the shift in momentum, and a second Nebraska touchdown as the game waned secured the win, Nebraska's ninth straight going back to 1932, six of those nine being shutout victories. Nebraska finished their conference schedule undefeated and secured another league title, while sending Kansas farther back in the series to 9–29–2.

=== Pittsburgh ===
Nebraska at Pittsburgh

Team	1	2	3	4	Total
Nebraska	0	0	0	0	0
• Pittsburgh	0	0	0	6	6

- Date: November 18
- Location: Pitt Stadium • Pittsburgh
- Game attendance: 35,000

Nebraska traveled to Pittsburgh with a conference title secured and often dominating the opposition, though Pittsburgh was doing much the same to the teams on their schedule. The two seemingly unstoppable squads met in a showdown that the Cornhuskers had awaited since last year, hoping to secure their first win against the Panthers in the bitter series since 1921. The teams fought to a virtual standstill for the first three quarters, with Nebraska turning Pittsburgh away scoreless after three incursions inside the Nebraska 5-yard line, as well as three others inside the 15. Finally, Pittsburgh found a crack in the defensive front and scored the day's lone touchdown on a 3-yard pass in the fourth quarter to decide the game. The Cornhusker undefeated streak was snapped at 13 games, and Nebraska fell to 1–4–3 against Pitt all time. Pittsburgh went on to finish their season 8–1–0, with a final #4 Dickinson System national ranking.

=== Iowa ===
Iowa at Nebraska

Team	1	2	Total
Iowa			6
• Nebraska			7

- Date: November 25
- Location: Memorial Stadium • Lincoln, Nebraska
- Game attendance: 34,000

Nebraska edged Iowa in the final seconds in another exciting game, as the 1932 Big Ten Conference scoring leader Hawkeyes gave all the fight that Nebraska wanted and then some in front of another record crowd in Lincoln. Iowa suffered a string of misfortunes which ultimately decided the game, beginning when Iowa fumbled on a third down pass play. The Iowa punter then failed to actually manage to kick the ball on the subsequent play, which handed Nebraska possession of the ball on Iowa's 29-yard line. Soon Nebraska was 1st and goal at the Iowa 5, when the Hawkeyes firmed up and held, setting the Cornhuskers up with 4th and goal, still on the 5. A surprising trick play ensued when a Nebraska runner scooped the ball from the field goal kicker's hands and scooted into the end zone to score. Late in the game, a poor Nebraska punt pushed back by the high winds gave Iowa a favorable starting spot on Nebraska's 35-yard line. Two passes later and it was 1st and goal on the Nebraska 1, and two more plays after that Iowa crossed the goal line. The stands were on edge as the seconds ticked away while Iowa prepared to kick the point after, but the ball went low for the miss to cost Iowa the game. The stands erupted in celebration, as the crestfallen Hawkeyes were sent home in defeat, and the Cornhuskers improved in the series to 15–7–3. This was the program's 250th all-time win.

=== Oregon State ===
Oregon State at Nebraska

Team	1	2	Total
Oregon State			0
• Nebraska			22

- Date: November 30
- Location: Memorial Stadium • Lincoln, Nebraska
- Game attendance: 25,000

Oregon State arrived in Nebraska to face the Cornhuskers for the third time, hoping to get a win after suffering defeats in both previous meetings. The Beavers managed to hold the Cornhuskers to just 6 points in the first half, and were poised to score again in the third quarter when they secured a 1st and goal position on the Nebraska 5-yard line. Nebraska's defense suddenly solidified and sent the Beavers away with no points for their trouble as the quarter ended. It looked like it might be a battle to the end when events suddenly turned against the favor of the Beavers when they flubbed a punt return and then lost their momentum. After that, the game was all Nebraska when Oregon State failed to find traction in the face of a Nebraska safety and two interceptions. Coach Bible sent in the reserves late in the game, and they managed a touchdown of their own in just two plays as time expired. Oregon State was handed their third loss in as many tries against Nebraska, in what was the sixth Cornhusker shutout victory on the season.

== After the season ==
Once again Nebraska was on top of the Big 6, with five of the last six league titles now owned by the Cornhuskers. Despite the one loss to a Pittsburgh team that was ranked #4 nationwide at the end of the season, the same Dickinson System ranking that gave the Panthers their high ranking also determined that Nebraska was the #2 team nationwide at the conclusion of the season, the one loss to Pitt costing Nebraska what would have been their first National Championship. Coach Bible's career record at Nebraska after five years was now improved to 31–8–6 (.756). Nebraska's overall program record improved to 251–82–26 (.735) while the perfect 1933 conference record moved the Cornhuskers to 74–10–8 (.848) in league play.
