= 1933 Iowa State Cyclones football team =

American college football season

1933 Iowa State Cyclones football
- Conference: Big Six Conference
- Record: 3–5–1 (1–4 Big 6)
- Head coach: George F. Veenker (3rd season)
- Captain: Magnus Lichter
- Home stadium: State Field

1933 Big Six Conference football standings
	Conf.					Overall
Team	W		L		T	W		L		T
No. 2 Nebraska $	5	–	0	–	0	8	–	1	–	0
Kansas State	4	–	1	–	0	6	–	2	–	1
Oklahoma	3	–	2	–	0	4	–	4	–	1
Kansas	2	–	3	–	0	5	–	4	–	1
Iowa State	1	–	4	–	0	3	–	5	–	1
Missouri	0	–	5	–	0	1	–	8	–	0
$ – Conference champion; Rankings from Dickinson System

The 1933 Iowa State Cyclones football team represented Iowa State College of Agricultural and Mechanic Arts (later renamed Iowa State University) in the Big Six Conference during the 1933 college football season. In their third season under head coach George F. Veenker, the Cyclones compiled a 3–5–1 record (1–4 against conference opponents), finished in fifth place in the conference, and were outscored by opponents by a combined total of 120 to 73. They played their home games at State Field in Ames, Iowa.

Magnus Lichter was the team captain. No Iowa State player was selected as a first-team all-conference player.

== Schedule ==
Date	Time	Opponent	Site	Result	Attendance	Source
September 23	3:00 pm	Central (IA)*	State Field; Ames, IA	W 14–0	4,067	
September 29	9:30 pm	at Denver*	DU Stadium; Denver, CO	W 18–13	5,000	
October 14	2:00 pm	Nebraska	State Field; Ames, IA (rivalry)	L 0–20	5,200–5,209	
October 21	2:00 pm	at Oklahoma	Oklahoma Memorial Stadium; Norman, OK	L 7–19	8,081	
October 28	2:00 pm	Missouri^{†}	State Field; Ames, IA (rivalry)	W 14–7	3,555	
November 4	2:00 pm	at Iowa*	Iowa Stadium; Iowa City, IA (rivalry)	L 7–27	15,685	
November 11	2:00 pm	Kansas State	State Field; Ames, IA (rivalry)	L 0–7	3,100	
November 18	2:00 pm	at Kansas	Memorial Stadium; Lawrence, KS	L 6–20	6,200	
November 25	2:00 pm	at Drake*	Drake Stadium; Des Moines, IA	T 7–7	7,019	
*Non-conference game; ^{†}Homecoming; All times are in Central time
