= 1933 Oklahoma Sooners football team =

American college football season

1933 Oklahoma Sooners football
- Conference: Big Six Conference
- Record: 4–4–1 (3–2 Big 6)
- Head coach: Lewie Hardage (2nd season)
- Captain: Bill Pansze
- Home stadium: Memorial Stadium

1933 Big Six Conference football standings
| | Conf. | | | | | Overall |
| Team | W | | L | | T | W | | L | | T |
|---|---|---|---|---|---|---|---|---|---|---|
| No. 2 Nebraska $ | 5 | – | 0 | – | 0 | 8 | – | 1 | – | 0 |
| Kansas State | 4 | – | 1 | – | 0 | 6 | – | 2 | – | 1 |
| Oklahoma | 3 | – | 2 | – | 0 | 4 | – | 4 | – | 1 |
| Kansas | 2 | – | 3 | – | 0 | 5 | – | 4 | – | 1 |
| Iowa State | 1 | – | 4 | – | 0 | 3 | – | 5 | – | 1 |
| Missouri | 0 | – | 5 | – | 0 | 1 | – | 8 | – | 0 |
$ – Conference champion; Rankings from Dickinson System

The 1933 Oklahoma Sooners football team represented the University of Oklahoma in the 1933 college football season. In their second year under head coach Lewie Hardage, the Sooners compiled a 4–4–1 record (3–2 against conference opponents), finished in third place in the Big Six Conference, and outscored their opponents by a combined total of 82 to 70.

No Sooners received All-America honors in 1933, but four Sooners received all-conference honors: guards Ellis Bashara and James Stacy, back Bob Dunlap, and tackle Cassius Gentry.

== Schedule ==
| Date | Opponent | Site | Result | Attendance | Source |
|---|---|---|---|---|---|
| September 30 | Vanderbilt* | Memorial Stadium; Norman, OK | T 0–0 | 18,000 | |
| October 7 | at Tulsa* | Skelly Field; Tulsa, OK | L 6–20 | | |
| October 14 | vs. Texas* | Fair Park Stadium; Dallas, TX (rivalry) | W 9–0 | 20,000 | |
| October 21 | Iowa State | Memorial Stadium; Norman, OK | W 19–7 | 8,081 | |
| October 28 | at Nebraska | Memorial Stadium; Lincoln, NE (rivalry) | L 7–16 | 16,507 | |
| November 4 | Kansas | Memorial Stadium; Norman, OK | W 20–0 | | |
| November 11 | at Missouri | Memorial Stadium; Columbia, MO (rivalry) | W 21–0 | | |
| November 18 | at Kansas State | Memorial Stadium; Manhattan, KS | L 0–14 | | |
| November 23 | Oklahoma A&M* | Memorial Stadium; Norman, OK (Bedlam) | L 0–13 | | |
*Non-conference game
