= 1933 Missouri Tigers football team =

American college football season

1933 Missouri Tigers football
- Conference: Big Six Conference
- Record: 1–8 (0–5 Big 6)
- Head coach: Frank Carideo (2nd season)
- Home stadium: Memorial Stadium

1933 Big Six Conference football standings
	Conf.					Overall
Team	W		L		T	W		L		T
No. 2 Nebraska $	5	–	0	–	0	8	–	1	–	0
Kansas State	4	–	1	–	0	6	–	2	–	1
Oklahoma	3	–	2	–	0	4	–	4	–	1
Kansas	2	–	3	–	0	5	–	4	–	1
Iowa State	1	–	4	–	0	3	–	5	–	1
Missouri	0	–	5	–	0	1	–	8	–	0
$ – Conference champion; Rankings from Dickinson System

The 1933 Missouri Tigers football team was an American football team that represented the University of Missouri in the Big Six Conference (Big 6) during the 1933 college football season. The team compiled a 1–8 record (0–5 against Big 6 opponents), finished in sixth place in the Big 6, and was outscored by all opponents by a combined total of 193 to 58. Frank Carideo was the head coach for the second of three seasons. The team played its home games at Memorial Stadium in Columbia, Missouri.

The team's leading scorer was Sidney Johnson with 18 points.

== Schedule ==
Date	Opponent	Site	Result	Attendance	Source
October 6	Central (MO)*	Memorial Stadium; Columbia, MO	W 31–0		
October 7	Kirksville State*	Memorial Stadium; Columbia, MO	L 6–26		
October 14	Kansas State	Memorial Stadium; Columbia, MO	L 0–33		
October 21	at Saint Louis*	Wash Stadium; St. Louis, MO	L 7–13	12,000	
October 28	at Iowa State	State Field; Ames, IA (rivalry)	L 7–14	3,555	
November 4	Nebraska	Memorial Stadium; Columbia, MO (rivalry)	L 0–26	5,404	
November 11	Oklahoma	Memorial Stadium; Columbia, MO (rivalry)	L 0–21		
November 18	at Washington University*	Francis Field; St. Louis, MO	L 7–33	8,160	
November 30	at Kansas	Memorial Stadium; Lawrence, KS (rivalry)	L 0–27		
*Non-conference game
