= 1933 Kansas Jayhawks football team =

American college football season

1933 Kansas Jayhawks football
- Conference: Big Six Conference
- Record: 5–4–1 (2–3 Big 6)
- Head coach: Adrian Lindsey (2nd season)
- Captain: Ormand Beach
- Home stadium: Memorial Stadium

1933 Big Six Conference football standings
	Conf.					Overall
Team	W		L		T	W		L		T
No. 2 Nebraska $	5	–	0	–	0	8	–	1	–	0
Kansas State	4	–	1	–	0	6	–	2	–	1
Oklahoma	3	–	2	–	0	4	–	4	–	1
Kansas	2	–	3	–	0	5	–	4	–	1
Iowa State	1	–	4	–	0	3	–	5	–	1
Missouri	0	–	5	–	0	1	–	8	–	0
$ – Conference champion; Rankings from Dickinson System

The 1933 Kansas Jayhawks football team represented the University of Kansas in the Big Six Conference during the 1933 college football season. In their second season under head coach Adrian Lindsey, the Jayhawks compiled a 5–4–1 record (2–3 against conference opponents), finished in fourth place in the conference, and outscored opponents by a combined total of 102 to 51. They played their home games at Memorial Stadium in Lawrence, Kansas. Ormand Beach was the team captain.

Three Kansas players were selected by the Associated Press as second-team players on the 1933 All-Big Six Conference football team: fullback Ormand Beach, end Ernest Casini, and tackle Peter Mehringer.

== Schedule ==
Date	Opponent	Site	Result	Attendance	Source
September 23	Warrensburg*	Memorial Stadium; Lawrence, KS	W 34–0		
September 30	at Creighton*	Creighton Stadium; Omaha, NE	W 14–0		
October 7	at Notre Dame*	Notre Dame Stadium; Notre Dame, IN	T 0–0	9,221	
October 21	at Tulsa*	Skelly Field; Tulsa, OK	L 0–7		
October 28	Kansas State	Memorial Stadium; Lawrence, KS (rivalry)	L 0–6		
November 4	at Oklahoma	Memorial Stadium; Norman, OK	L 0–20		
November 11	at Nebraska	Memorial Stadium; Lincoln, NE (rivalry)	L 0–12	28,503	
November 18	Iowa State	Memorial Stadium; Lawrence, KS	W 20–6		
November 30	Missouri^{†}	Memorial Stadium; Lawrence, KS (rivalry)	W 27–0		
December 2	at George Washington*	Griffith Stadium; Washington, DC	W 7–0	10,000	
*Non-conference game; ^{†}Homecoming
