= 1933 Holy Cross Crusaders football team =

American college football season

1933 Holy Cross Crusaders football
- Conference: Independent
- Record: 7–2
- Head coach: Eddie Anderson (1st season)
- Home stadium: Fitton Field

1933 Eastern college football independents records
	Conf.			Overall
Team	W	L	T	W		L		T
No. 7 Princeton		–		9	–	0	–	0
Duquesne		–		10	–	1	–	0
No. 9 Army		–		9	–	1	–	0
Boston College		–		8	–	1	–	0
Columbia		–		8	–	1	–	0
Pittsburgh		–		8	–	1	–	0
Colgate		–		6	–	1	–	1
Bucknell		–		7	–	2	–	0
Fordham		–		6	–	2	–	0
Tufts		–		6	–	2	–	0
Villanova		–		7	–	2	–	1
Harvard		–		5	–	2	–	1
Drexel		–		5	–	3	–	0
Massachusetts State		–		5	–	3	–	0
Temple		–		5	–	3	–	0
Manhattan		–		5	–	3	–	1
Cornell		–		4	–	3	–	0
Carnegie Tech		–		4	–	3	–	2
La Salle		–		3	–	3	–	2
Syracuse		–		4	–	4	–	0
Yale		–		4	–	4	–	0
Penn State		–		3	–	3	–	1
Brown		–		3	–	5	–	0
Vermont		–		3	–	5	–	0
Franklin & Marshall		–		4	–	5	–	0
NYU		–		2	–	4	–	1
Penn		–		2	–	4	–	1
Northeastern		–		1	–	3	–	1
Boston University		–		2	–	5	–	0
Washington & Jefferson		–		2	–	7	–	1
CCNY		–		1	–	5	–	1
Rankings from Dickinson System

The 1933 Holy Cross Crusaders football team was an American football team that represented the College of the Holy Cross as an independent during the 1933 college football season. In its first year under head coach Eddie Anderson, the team compiled a 7–2 record. The team played its home games at Fitton Field in Worcester, Massachusetts.

== Schedule ==
Date	Opponent	Site	Result	Attendance	Source
September 30	Saint Michael's	Fitton Field; Worcester, MA	W 50–0		
October 7	Catholic University	Fitton Field; Worcester, MA	W 17–7		
October 14	Providence	Fitton Field; Worcester, MA	W 21–0		
October 21	at Harvard	Harvard Stadium; Boston, MA	W 10–7		
October 28	Brown	Fitton Field; Worcester, MA	W 19–7		
November 4	at Detroit	University of Detroit Stadium; Detroit, MI	L 0–24	20,000	
November 11	at Manhattan	Ebbets Field; Brooklyn, NY	W 27–6		
November 18	Springfield	Fitton Field; Worcester, MA	W 19–6		
December 2	at Boston College	Alumni Field; Chestnut Hill, MA (rivalry)	L 9–13	25,000	
