= 1933 Dartmouth Indians football team =

American college football season

1933 Dartmouth Indians football
- Conference: Independent
- Record: 4–4–1
- Head coach: Jackson Cannell (7th season)
- Captain: Philip Glazer
- Home stadium: Memorial Field

1933 Eastern college football independents records
	Conf.			Overall
Team	W	L	T	W		L		T
No. 7 Princeton		–		9	–	0	–	0
Duquesne		–		10	–	1	–	0
No. 9 Army		–		9	–	1	–	0
Boston College		–		8	–	1	–	0
Columbia		–		8	–	1	–	0
Pittsburgh		–		8	–	1	–	0
Colgate		–		6	–	1	–	1
Bucknell		–		7	–	2	–	0
Fordham		–		6	–	2	–	0
Tufts		–		6	–	2	–	0
Villanova		–		7	–	2	–	1
Harvard		–		5	–	2	–	1
Drexel		–		5	–	3	–	0
Massachusetts State		–		5	–	3	–	0
Temple		–		5	–	3	–	0
Manhattan		–		5	–	3	–	1
Cornell		–		4	–	3	–	0
Carnegie Tech		–		4	–	3	–	2
La Salle		–		3	–	3	–	2
Syracuse		–		4	–	4	–	0
Yale		–		4	–	4	–	0
Penn State		–		3	–	3	–	1
Brown		–		3	–	5	–	0
Vermont		–		3	–	5	–	0
Franklin & Marshall		–		4	–	5	–	0
NYU		–		2	–	4	–	1
Penn		–		2	–	4	–	1
Northeastern		–		1	–	3	–	1
Boston University		–		2	–	5	–	0
Washington & Jefferson		–		2	–	7	–	1
CCNY		–		1	–	5	–	1
Rankings from Dickinson System

The 1933 Dartmouth Indians football team was an American football team that represented Dartmouth College as an independent during the 1933 college football season. In their seventh and final season under head coach Jackson Cannell, the Indians compiled a 4–4–1 record. Philip Glazer was the team captain.

George Stangle was the team's leading scorer, with 30 points, from five touchdowns.

Dartmouth played its home games at Memorial Field on the college campus in Hanover, New Hampshire.

== Schedule ==
Date	Opponent	Site	Result	Attendance	Source
September 30	Norwich	Memorial Field; Hanover, NH	W 41–0		
October 7	Vermont	Memorial Field; Hanover, NH	W 36–6		
October 14	Bates	Memorial Field; Hanover, NH	W 14–0		
October 21	at Penn	Franklin Field; Philadelphia, PA	W 14–7	45,000	
October 28	at Harvard	Harvard Stadium; Boston, MA (rivalry)	T 7–7	35,000	
November 4	at Yale	Yale Bowl; New Haven, CT	L 13–14	25,000	
November 11	at Princeton	Palmer Stadium; Princeton, NJ	L 0–7	35,000–45,000	
November 18	Cornell	Memorial Field; Hanover, NH (rivalry)	L 0–7		
November 25	at Chicago	Stagg Field; Chicago, IL	L 0–39	22,000	
