= Reginald D. Root =

American football and lacrosse coach

Playing career
- 1924–1925: Yale

Coaching career (HC unless noted)

Men's lacrosse
- 1929–1931 1936–1943: Yale

Football
- 1929–1930: UNAM
- 1933: Yale
- 1941: Yale (assistant)

Head coaching record
- Overall: 42–27–1 (men's lacrosse); 4–4 (football)

Reginald D. Root was an American football and men's lacrosse coach at Yale University.

A native of Le Roy, New York, Root graduated from Yale in 1926. He was "one of the best lacrosse players ever turned out by Yale" and played college football for the Bulldogs from as a backup tackle in 1924 and 1925.

In 1929, Root was named the head coach at the National Autonomous University of Mexico, even meeting the President of Mexico, Emilio Portes Gil, to discuss the sport. His team played against Mississippi College in 1929 and 1930. Root developed a strong forward pass attack, completing a school-record 23 passes in their 1929 matchup against Mississippi College, and mixed English and Spanish expletives into his pep talks. When Dwight Morrow, the U.S. Ambassador to Mexico, attended a team practice, he walked off the field with the remark: "Did he learn all those cuss words at Yale?" After two seasons with the team, Root returned to Yale as an assistant freshman and junior varsity coach in 1931 and 1932. He succeeded Mal Stevens as Yale head coach for the 1933 season. In his lone season at the helm, Root compiled a record of 4–4.

Root also served as the Yale men's lacrosse coach for two stints, first during the 1929–1930 to 1930–1931 seasons and later during the 1936–1937 to 1942–1943 seasons while compiling a record of 42–27–1.

== Head coaching record ==
=== Men's lacrosse ===
Record table
Season	Team	Overall	Conference	Standing	Postseason
Yale Bulldogs (Ivy) (1929–1931)
1929–30		7–1	4–0		
1930–31		7–2	5–0		
Yale Bulldogs (Ivy) (1936–1943)
1936–37		4–4	2–2		
1937–38		2–4	2–2		
1938–39		3–5	1–3		
1939–40		5–4–1	1–2		
1940–41 †		7–3			
1941–42		5–2	3–1		
1942–43		2–2	1–0		
Yale:		42–27–1	19–10		
Total:		42–27–1			
National champion Postseason invitational champion Conference regular season champion Conference regular season and conference tournament champion Division regular season champion Division regular season and conference tournament champion Conference tournament champion

† Competed as an independent

=== Football ===
Year	Team	Overall	Conference	Standing	Bowl/playoffs
Yale Bulldogs (Independent) (1933)
1933	Yale	4–4			
Yale:		4–4			
Total:		4–4			
