= 1933 Rutgers Queensmen football team =

American college football season

1933 Rutgers Queensmen football

Middle Three champion
- Conference: Middle Three Conference
- Record: 6–3–1 (2–0 Middle Three)
- Head coach: J. Wilder Tasker (3rd season)
- Captains: George Kramer; William Demarest; Francis Heenan
- Home stadium: Neilson Field

1933 Middle Three Conference football standings
	Conf.					Overall
Team	W		L		T	W		L		T
Rutgers $	2	–	0	–	0	6	–	3	–	1
Lafayette	1	–	1	–	0	3	–	5	–	1
Lehigh	0	–	2	–	0	2	–	6	–	0
$ – Conference champion

The 1933 Rutgers Queensmen football team represented Rutgers University in the 1933 college football season. In their third season under head coach J. Wilder Tasker, the Queensmen compiled a 6–3–1 record, won the Middle Three Conference championship, and outscored their opponents 146 to 94.

== Schedule ==
Date	Opponent	Site	Result	Attendance	Source
September 30	Franklin & Marshall	Neilson Field; New Brunswick, NJ	W 10–0		
October 7	Providence	Neilson Field; New Brunswick, NJ	W 21–0	5,000	
October 14	at Colgate	Whitnall Field; Hamilton, NY	L 2–25		
October 21	Pennsylvania Military	Neilson Field; New Brunswick, NJ	W 10–0		
October 28	Lehigh	Neilson Field; New Brunswick, NJ	W 27–0	6,000	
November 4	Springfield	Neilson Field; New Brunswick, NJ	W 31–6		
November 11	at Lafayette	Fisher Field; Easton, PA	W 20–13		
November 18	NYU	Yankee Stadium; Bronx, NY	T 6–6	15,000	
November 25	at Princeton	Palmer Stadium; Princeton, NJ (rivalry)	L 6–26	45,000	
December 2	Villanova	Neilson Field; New Brunswick, NJ	L 13–18		
