= 1933 Lafayette Leopards football team =

American football club

1933 Lafayette Leopards football
- Conference: Middle Three Conference
- Record: 3–5–1 (1–1 Middle Three)
- Head coach: Herb McCracken (10th season)
- Captain: Jerry Miller
- Home stadium: Fisher Field

1933 Middle Three Conference football standings
	Conf.					Overall
Team	W		L		T	W		L		T
Rutgers $	2	–	0	–	0	6	–	3	–	1
Lafayette	1	–	1	–	0	3	–	5	–	1
Lehigh	0	–	2	–	0	2	–	6	–	0
$ – Conference champion

The 1933 Lafayette Leopards football team was an American football team that represented Lafayette College in the Middle Three Conference during the 1933 college football season. In its 10th season under head coach Herb McCracken, the team compiled a 3–5–1 record. Jerry Miller was the team captain.

== Schedule ==
Date	Opponent	Site	Result	Attendance	Source
September 30	Muhlenberg*	Fisher Field; Easton, PA	W 20–0		
October 7	at Franklin & Marshall*	Lancaster, PA	W 12–0		
October 14	at NYU*	Yankee Stadium; Bronx, NY	L 12–13	12,000	
October 21	Bucknell*	Fisher Field; Easton, PA	L 0–21		
October 28	at Colgate*	Whitnall Field; Hamilton, NY	T 0–0		
November 4	at Penn*	Franklin Field; Philadelphia, PA	L 7–16		
November 11	Rutgers	Fisher Field; Easton, PA	L 13–20		
November 18	at Columbia*	Baker Field; New York, NY	L 6–46		
November 25	at Lehigh	Taylor Stadium; Bethlethem, PA (rivalry)	W 54–12	10,000	
*Non-conference game
