= 1933 West Virginia Wesleyan Bobcats football team =

American college football season

1933 West Virginia Wesleyan Bobcats football
- Conference: West Virginia Athletic Conference
- Record: 4–7 (2–2 WVAC)
- Head coach: Cebe Ross (9th season)

1933 West Virginia Athletic Conference football standings
	Conf.					Overall
Team	W		L		T	W		L		T
Davis & Elkins $	5	–	0	–	0	9	–	1	–	1
Salem	7	–	1	–	0	7	–	1	–	0
Fairmont State	3	–	1	–	0	6	–	1	–	0
West Virginia Wesleyan	2	–	2	–	0	4	–	7	–	0
West Liberty State	1	–	3	–	1	2	–	4	–	2
Glenville State	1	–	3	–	1	2	–	4	–	1
Morris Harvey	0	–	5	–	0	1	–	8	–	0
Concord *	2	–	1	–	0	4	–	3	–	0
New River State *	1	–	1	–	0	4	–	2	–	0
Shepherd *	1	–	2	–	0	5	–	2	–	0
Marshall *	0	–	1	–	0	3	–	5	–	1
Potomac State *	0	–	3	–	0	2	–	4	–	0
$ – Conference champion; * – Did not qualify for conference standings Ties did not count in conference standings.

The 1933 West Virginia Wesleyan Bobcats football team represented West Virginia Wesleyan College as a member of the West Virginia Athletic Conference (WVAC) during the 1933 college football season. Led by ninth-year head coach Cebe Ross, the Bobcats compiled an overall record of 4–7 with a mark of 2–2 in conference play, placing fourth in the WVAC.

== Schedule ==
Date	Time	Opponent	Site	Result	Attendance	Source
September 22		at Duquesne*	Forbes Field; Pittsburgh, PA	L 0–25	7,500	
September 30		Geneva*	Buckhannon, WV	L 6–14		
October 7		at NYU*	Yankee Stadium; Bronx, NY	W 3–0	12,000	
October 14		Davis & Elkins	Buckhannon, WV	L 6–27		
October 20		vs. Salem	Clarksburg, WV	L 7–13		
October 27		at George Washington*	Griffith Stadium; Washington, DC	L 0–33	10,000	
November 4		Bethany (WV)*^{†}	Buckhannon, WV	W 34–0		
November 11	2:00 p.m.	Dayton*	University of Dayton Stadium; Dayton, OH	L 6–7		
November 18		at West Virginia*	Mountaineer Field; Morgantown, WV	L 13–26	4,000	
November 25		Glenville State	Buckhannon, WV	W 26–7		
November 30		at Marshall	Fairfield Stadium; Huntington, WV	W 12–6		
*Non-conference game; ^{†}Homecoming; All times are in Eastern time
