= 1933 Lehigh Engineers football team =

American college football season

1933 Lehigh Engineers football
- Conference: Middle Three Conference
- Record: 2–6 (0–2 Middle Three)
- Head coach: A. Austin Tate (6th season)
- Captain: P. E. Short
- Home stadium: Taylor Stadium

1933 Middle Three Conference football standings
	Conf.					Overall
Team	W		L		T	W		L		T
Rutgers $	2	–	0	–	0	6	–	3	–	1
Lafayette	1	–	1	–	0	3	–	5	–	1
Lehigh	0	–	2	–	0	2	–	6	–	0
$ – Conference champion

The 1933 Lehigh Engineers football team was an American football team that represented Lehigh University during the 1933 college football season. In its sixth and final season under head coach A. Austin Tate, the team compiled a 2–6 record, and lost both games against its Middle Three Conference rivals. Lehigh played home games at Taylor Stadium in Bethlehem, Pennsylvania.

== Schedule ==
Date	Opponent	Site	Result	Attendance	Source
September 30	Drexel*	Taylor Stadium; Bethlehem, PA	W 19–0		
October 7	at Columbia*	Baker Field; New York, NY	L 0–39	16,000	
October 14	Johns Hopkins*	Taylor Stadium; Bethlehem, PA	W 14–7	6,000	
October 21	at Penn State*	New Beaver Field; State College, PA	L 0–33	5,000	
October 28	at Rutgers	Neilson Field; New Brunswick, NJ	L 0–27	6,000	
November 4	at Harvard*	Harvard Stadium; Boston, MA	L 0–27	8,000	
November 18	Muhlenberg*	Taylor Stadium; Bethlehem, PA	L 0–10		
November 25	Lafayette	Taylor Stadium; Bethlehem, PA (rivalry)	L 12–54	10,000	
*Non-conference game
