= 1933 Harvard Crimson football team =

American college football season

1933 Harvard Crimson football
- Conference: Independent
- Record: 5–2–1
- Head coach: Eddie Casey (3rd season)
- Home stadium: Harvard Stadium

1933 Eastern college football independents records
	Conf.			Overall
Team	W	L	T	W		L		T
No. 7 Princeton		–		9	–	0	–	0
Duquesne		–		10	–	1	–	0
No. 9 Army		–		9	–	1	–	0
Boston College		–		8	–	1	–	0
Columbia		–		8	–	1	–	0
Pittsburgh		–		8	–	1	–	0
Colgate		–		6	–	1	–	1
Bucknell		–		7	–	2	–	0
Fordham		–		6	–	2	–	0
Tufts		–		6	–	2	–	0
Villanova		–		7	–	2	–	1
Harvard		–		5	–	2	–	1
Drexel		–		5	–	3	–	0
Massachusetts State		–		5	–	3	–	0
Temple		–		5	–	3	–	0
Manhattan		–		5	–	3	–	1
Cornell		–		4	–	3	–	0
Carnegie Tech		–		4	–	3	–	2
La Salle		–		3	–	3	–	2
Syracuse		–		4	–	4	–	0
Yale		–		4	–	4	–	0
Penn State		–		3	–	3	–	1
Brown		–		3	–	5	–	0
Vermont		–		3	–	5	–	0
Franklin & Marshall		–		4	–	5	–	0
NYU		–		2	–	4	–	1
Penn		–		2	–	4	–	1
Northeastern		–		1	–	3	–	1
Boston University		–		2	–	5	–	0
Washington & Jefferson		–		2	–	7	–	1
CCNY		–		1	–	5	–	1
Rankings from Dickinson System

The 1933 Harvard Crimson football team was an American football team that represented Harvard University as an independent during the 1933 college football season. In its third season under head coach Eddie Casey, the team compiled a 5–2–1 record and outscored opponents by a total of 139 to 56. The team played its home games at Harvard Stadium in Boston.

== Schedule ==
Date	Opponent	Site	Result	Attendance	Source
October 7	Bates	Harvard Stadium; Boston, MA	W 33–0		
October 14	New Hampshire	Harvard Stadium; Boston, MA	W 34–0		
October 21	Holy Cross	Harvard Stadium; Boston, MA	L 7–10		
October 28	Dartmouth	Harvard Stadium; Boston, MA (rivalry)	T 7–7	35,000	
November 4	Lehigh	Harvard Stadium; Boston, MA	W 27–0	8,000	
November 11	Army	Harvard Stadium; Boston, MA	L 0–27		
November 18	Brown	Harvard Stadium; Boston, MA	W 12–6		
November 25	Yale	Harvard Stadium; Boston, MA (rivalry)	W 19–6		
