= 1933 Penn Quakers football team =

American college football season

1933 Penn Quakers football
- Conference: Independent
- Record: 2–4–1
- Head coach: Harvey Harman (3rd season)
- Captain: Roy Engle
- Home stadium: Franklin Field

1933 Eastern college football independents records
	Conf.			Overall
Team	W	L	T	W		L		T
No. 7 Princeton		–		9	–	0	–	0
Duquesne		–		10	–	1	–	0
No. 9 Army		–		9	–	1	–	0
Boston College		–		8	–	1	–	0
Columbia		–		8	–	1	–	0
Pittsburgh		–		8	–	1	–	0
Colgate		–		6	–	1	–	1
Bucknell		–		7	–	2	–	0
Fordham		–		6	–	2	–	0
Tufts		–		6	–	2	–	0
Villanova		–		7	–	2	–	1
Harvard		–		5	–	2	–	1
Drexel		–		5	–	3	–	0
Massachusetts State		–		5	–	3	–	0
Temple		–		5	–	3	–	0
Manhattan		–		5	–	3	–	1
Cornell		–		4	–	3	–	0
Carnegie Tech		–		4	–	3	–	2
La Salle		–		3	–	3	–	2
Syracuse		–		4	–	4	–	0
Yale		–		4	–	4	–	0
Penn State		–		3	–	3	–	1
Brown		–		3	–	5	–	0
Vermont		–		3	–	5	–	0
Franklin & Marshall		–		4	–	5	–	0
NYU		–		2	–	4	–	1
Penn		–		2	–	4	–	1
Northeastern		–		1	–	3	–	1
Boston University		–		2	–	5	–	0
Washington & Jefferson		–		2	–	7	–	1
CCNY		–		1	–	5	–	1
Rankings from Dickinson System

The 1933 Penn Quakers football team was an American football team that represented the University of Pennsylvania as an independent during the 1933 college football season. In its third season under head coach Harvey Harman, the team compiled a 2–4–1 record and were outscored by a total of 80 to 57. The team played its home games at Franklin Field in Philadelphia.

== Schedule ==
Date	Opponent	Site	Result	Attendance	Source
October 14	Franklin & Marshall	Franklin Field; Philadelphia, PA	W 9–0		
October 21	Dartmouth	Franklin Field; Philadelphia, PA	L 7–14	45,000	
October 28	Navy	Franklin Field; Philadelphia, PA	L 0–13		
November 4	Lafayette	Franklin Field; Philadelphia, PA	W 16–7		
November 11	Ohio State	Franklin Field; Philadelphia, PA	L 7–20	45,000	
November 18	Penn State	Franklin Field; Philadelphia, PA	T 6–6	20,000	
November 30	Cornell	Franklin Field; Philadelphia, PA (rivalry)	L 12–20		
