= 1933 Princeton Tigers football team =

American college football season

1933 Princeton Tigers football

Co-national champion (Davis)
- Conference: Independent
- Record: 9–0
- Head coach: Fritz Crisler (2nd season)
- Captain: Arthur Stephen Lane
- Home stadium: Palmer Stadium

1933 Eastern college football independents records
	Conf.			Overall
Team	W	L	T	W		L		T
No. 7 Princeton		–		9	–	0	–	0
Duquesne		–		10	–	1	–	0
No. 9 Army		–		9	–	1	–	0
Boston College		–		8	–	1	–	0
Columbia		–		8	–	1	–	0
Pittsburgh		–		8	–	1	–	0
Colgate		–		6	–	1	–	1
Bucknell		–		7	–	2	–	0
Fordham		–		6	–	2	–	0
Tufts		–		6	–	2	–	0
Villanova		–		7	–	2	–	1
Harvard		–		5	–	2	–	1
Drexel		–		5	–	3	–	0
Massachusetts State		–		5	–	3	–	0
Temple		–		5	–	3	–	0
Manhattan		–		5	–	3	–	1
Cornell		–		4	–	3	–	0
Carnegie Tech		–		4	–	3	–	2
La Salle		–		3	–	3	–	2
Syracuse		–		4	–	4	–	0
Yale		–		4	–	4	–	0
Penn State		–		3	–	3	–	1
Brown		–		3	–	5	–	0
Vermont		–		3	–	5	–	0
Franklin & Marshall		–		4	–	5	–	0
NYU		–		2	–	4	–	1
Penn		–		2	–	4	–	1
Northeastern		–		1	–	3	–	1
Boston University		–		2	–	5	–	0
Washington & Jefferson		–		2	–	7	–	1
CCNY		–		1	–	5	–	1
Rankings from Dickinson System

The 1933 Princeton Tigers football team was an American football team that represented Princeton University as an independent during the 1933 college football season. In their second season under head coach Fritz Crisler, the Tigers compiled a perfect 9–0 record, shut out seven of nine opponents, and outscored all opponents by a total of 217 to 8.

There was no contemporaneous system in 1933 for determining a national champion. However, Princeton was retroactively named as the national champion by Parke H. Davis. The 1933 Michigan Wolverines football team was selected as national champion by 10 other selectors and as co-champion by Davis.

Tackle Charles Ceppi was selected as a first-team All-American by the All-American Board, the Football Writers Association of America, the International News Service, Liberty magazine, the North American Newspaper Alliance, the Central Press Association, Davis J. Walsh, and the Walter Camp Football Foundation. He was named to the second team by the Associated Press and United Press.

Other key players included halfback Garrett LeVan, end Ken Fairman, quarterback Jack Kadlic, back Homer Spofford, and guard Frank John.

== Schedule ==
Date	Opponent	Site	Result	Attendance	Source
October 7	Amherst	Palmer Stadium; Princeton, NJ	W 40–0		
October 14	Williams	Palmer Stadium; Princeton, NJ	W 45–0		
October 21	Columbia	Palmer Stadium; Princeton, NJ	W 20–0	40,000	
October 28	Washington and Lee	Palmer Stadium; Princeton, NJ	W 6–0		
November 4	at Brown	Brown Field; Providence, RI	W 33–0	20,000	
November 11	Dartmouth	Palmer Stadium; Princeton, NJ	W 7–0	35,000–45,000	
November 18	Navy	Palmer Stadium; Princeton, NJ	W 13–0	35,000	
November 25	Rutgers	Palmer Stadium; Princeton, NJ (rivalry)	W 26–6	45,000	
December 2	at Yale	Yale Bowl; New Haven, CT (rivalry)	W 27–2	40,000	
