= 1933 Yale Bulldogs football team =

American college football season

1933 Yale Bulldogs football
- Conference: Independent
- Record: 4–4
- Head coach: Reginald D. Root (1st season)
- Captain: Robert Lassiter
- Home stadium: Yale Bowl

1933 Eastern college football independents records
	Conf.			Overall
Team	W	L	T	W		L		T
No. 7 Princeton		–		9	–	0	–	0
Duquesne		–		10	–	1	–	0
No. 9 Army		–		9	–	1	–	0
Boston College		–		8	–	1	–	0
Columbia		–		8	–	1	–	0
Pittsburgh		–		8	–	1	–	0
Colgate		–		6	–	1	–	1
Bucknell		–		7	–	2	–	0
Fordham		–		6	–	2	–	0
Tufts		–		6	–	2	–	0
Villanova		–		7	–	2	–	1
Harvard		–		5	–	2	–	1
Drexel		–		5	–	3	–	0
Massachusetts State		–		5	–	3	–	0
Temple		–		5	–	3	–	0
Manhattan		–		5	–	3	–	1
Cornell		–		4	–	3	–	0
Carnegie Tech		–		4	–	3	–	2
La Salle		–		3	–	3	–	2
Syracuse		–		4	–	4	–	0
Yale		–		4	–	4	–	0
Penn State		–		3	–	3	–	1
Brown		–		3	–	5	–	0
Vermont		–		3	–	5	–	0
Franklin & Marshall		–		4	–	5	–	0
NYU		–		2	–	4	–	1
Penn		–		2	–	4	–	1
Northeastern		–		1	–	3	–	1
Boston University		–		2	–	5	–	0
Washington & Jefferson		–		2	–	7	–	1
CCNY		–		1	–	5	–	1
Rankings from Dickinson System

The 1933 Yale Bulldogs football team represented Yale University in the 1933 college football season. The Bulldogs were led by first-year head coach Reginald D. Root, played their home games at the Yale Bowl and finished the season with a 4–4 record.

== Schedule ==
Date	Opponent	Site	Result	Attendance	Source
October 7	Maine	Yale Bowl; New Haven, CT	W 14–7		
October 14	Washington and Lee	Yale Bowl; New Haven, CT	W 14–0	18,000	
October 21	Brown	Yale Bowl; New Haven, CT	W 14–6		
October 28	Army	Yale Bowl; New Haven, CT	L 0–21		
November 4	Dartmouth	Yale Bowl; New Haven, CT	W 14–13	25,000	
November 11	Georgia	Yale Bowl; New Haven, CT	L 0–7	35,000	
November 25	at Harvard	Harvard Stadium; Boston, MA (rivalry)	L 6–19		
December 2	Princeton	Yale Bowl; New Haven, CT (rivalry)	L 2–27	40,000	
