= 1933 Brown Bears football team =

American college football season

1933 Brown Bears football
- Conference: Independent
- Record: 3–5
- Head coach: Tuss McLaughry (8th season)
- Home stadium: Brown Stadium

1933 Eastern college football independents records
	Conf.			Overall
Team	W	L	T	W		L		T
No. 7 Princeton		–		9	–	0	–	0
Duquesne		–		10	–	1	–	0
No. 9 Army		–		9	–	1	–	0
Boston College		–		8	–	1	–	0
Columbia		–		8	–	1	–	0
Pittsburgh		–		8	–	1	–	0
Colgate		–		6	–	1	–	1
Bucknell		–		7	–	2	–	0
Fordham		–		6	–	2	–	0
Tufts		–		6	–	2	–	0
Villanova		–		7	–	2	–	1
Harvard		–		5	–	2	–	1
Drexel		–		5	–	3	–	0
Massachusetts State		–		5	–	3	–	0
Temple		–		5	–	3	–	0
Manhattan		–		5	–	3	–	1
Cornell		–		4	–	3	–	0
Carnegie Tech		–		4	–	3	–	2
La Salle		–		3	–	3	–	2
Syracuse		–		4	–	4	–	0
Yale		–		4	–	4	–	0
Penn State		–		3	–	3	–	1
Brown		–		3	–	5	–	0
Vermont		–		3	–	5	–	0
Franklin & Marshall		–		4	–	5	–	0
NYU		–		2	–	4	–	1
Penn		–		2	–	4	–	1
Northeastern		–		1	–	3	–	1
Boston University		–		2	–	5	–	0
Washington & Jefferson		–		2	–	7	–	1
CCNY		–		1	–	5	–	1
Rankings from Dickinson System

The 1933 Brown Bears football team represented Brown University as an independent during the 1933 college football season. Led by eighth-year head coach Tuss McLaughry, the Bears compiled a record of 3–5.

== Schedule ==
Date	Opponent	Site	Result	Attendance	Source
October 7	Rhode Island State	Brown Stadium; Providence, RI (rivalry)	W 26–0		
October 14	Springfield	Brown Stadium; Providence, RI	W 13–6		
October 21	at Yale	Yale Bowl; New Haven, CT	L 6–14		
October 28	at Holy Cross	Fitton Field; Worcester, MA	L 7–19		
November 4	Princeton	Brown Stadium; Providence, RI	L 0–33	20,000	
November 11	Syracuse	Brown Stadium; Providence, RI	W 10–7	5,000	
November 18	at Harvard	Harvard Stadium; Boston, MA	L 6–12		
November 25	Colgate	Brown Stadium; Providence, RI	L 0–25		
