= 1933 Cornell Big Red football team =

American college football season

1933 Cornell Big Red football
- Conference: Independent
- Record: 4–3
- Head coach: Gil Dobie (14th season)
- Offensive scheme: Single-wing
- Base defense: 6–3–2
- Captain: John Ferraro
- Home stadium: Schoellkopf Field

1933 Eastern college football independents records
| | Conf. | | | Overall |
| Team | W | L | T | W | | L | | T |
|---|---|---|---|---|---|---|---|---|
| No. 7 Princeton | | – | | 9 | – | 0 | – | 0 |
| Duquesne | | – | | 10 | – | 1 | – | 0 |
| No. 9 Army | | – | | 9 | – | 1 | – | 0 |
| Boston College | | – | | 8 | – | 1 | – | 0 |
| Columbia | | – | | 8 | – | 1 | – | 0 |
| Pittsburgh | | – | | 8 | – | 1 | – | 0 |
| Colgate | | – | | 6 | – | 1 | – | 1 |
| Bucknell | | – | | 7 | – | 2 | – | 0 |
| Fordham | | – | | 6 | – | 2 | – | 0 |
| Tufts | | – | | 6 | – | 2 | – | 0 |
| Villanova | | – | | 7 | – | 2 | – | 1 |
| Harvard | | – | | 5 | – | 2 | – | 1 |
| Drexel | | – | | 5 | – | 3 | – | 0 |
| Massachusetts State | | – | | 5 | – | 3 | – | 0 |
| Temple | | – | | 5 | – | 3 | – | 0 |
| Manhattan | | – | | 5 | – | 3 | – | 1 |
| Cornell | | – | | 4 | – | 3 | – | 0 |
| Carnegie Tech | | – | | 4 | – | 3 | – | 2 |
| La Salle | | – | | 3 | – | 3 | – | 2 |
| Syracuse | | – | | 4 | – | 4 | – | 0 |
| Yale | | – | | 4 | – | 4 | – | 0 |
| Penn State | | – | | 3 | – | 3 | – | 1 |
| Brown | | – | | 3 | – | 5 | – | 0 |
| Vermont | | – | | 3 | – | 5 | – | 0 |
| Franklin & Marshall | | – | | 4 | – | 5 | – | 0 |
| NYU | | – | | 2 | – | 4 | – | 1 |
| Penn | | – | | 2 | – | 4 | – | 1 |
| Northeastern | | – | | 1 | – | 3 | – | 1 |
| Boston University | | – | | 2 | – | 5 | – | 0 |
| Washington & Jefferson | | – | | 2 | – | 7 | – | 1 |
| CCNY | | – | | 1 | – | 5 | – | 1 |
Rankings from Dickinson System

The 1933 Cornell Big Red football team was an American football team that represented Cornell University during the 1933 college football season. In their 14th season under head coach Gil Dobie, the Big Red compiled a 4–3 record and outscored their opponents by a combined total of 116 to 89.

== Schedule ==
| Date | Opponent | Site | Result | Source |
|---|---|---|---|---|
| September 30 | St. Lawrence | Schoellkopf Field; Ithaca, NY | W 48–7 | |
| October 7 | Richmond | Schoellkopf Field; Ithaca, NY | W 28–7 | |
| October 14 | at Michigan | Michigan Stadium; Ann Arbor, MI | L 0–40 | |
| October 21 | Syracuse | Schoellkopf Field; Ithaca, NY | L 7–14 | |
| November 4 | Columbia | Schoellkopf Field; Ithaca, NY (rivalry) | L 6–9 | |
| November 18 | at Dartmouth | Memorial Field; Hanover, NH (rivalry) | W 7–0 | |
| November 30 | at Penn | Franklin Field; Philadelphia, PA (rivalry) | W 20–12 | |
