= 1933 Boston College Eagles football team =

American college football season

1933 Boston College Eagles football
- Conference: Independent
- Record: 8–1
- Head coach: Joe McKenney (6th season)
- Captain: Frank Maloney
- Home stadium: Alumni Field

1933 Eastern college football independents records
	Conf.			Overall
Team	W	L	T	W		L		T
No. 7 Princeton		–		9	–	0	–	0
Duquesne		–		10	–	1	–	0
No. 9 Army		–		9	–	1	–	0
Boston College		–		8	–	1	–	0
Columbia		–		8	–	1	–	0
Pittsburgh		–		8	–	1	–	0
Colgate		–		6	–	1	–	1
Bucknell		–		7	–	2	–	0
Fordham		–		6	–	2	–	0
Tufts		–		6	–	2	–	0
Villanova		–		7	–	2	–	1
Harvard		–		5	–	2	–	1
Drexel		–		5	–	3	–	0
Massachusetts State		–		5	–	3	–	0
Temple		–		5	–	3	–	0
Manhattan		–		5	–	3	–	1
Cornell		–		4	–	3	–	0
Carnegie Tech		–		4	–	3	–	2
La Salle		–		3	–	3	–	2
Syracuse		–		4	–	4	–	0
Yale		–		4	–	4	–	0
Penn State		–		3	–	3	–	1
Brown		–		3	–	5	–	0
Vermont		–		3	–	5	–	0
Franklin & Marshall		–		4	–	5	–	0
NYU		–		2	–	4	–	1
Penn		–		2	–	4	–	1
Northeastern		–		1	–	3	–	1
Boston University		–		2	–	5	–	0
Washington & Jefferson		–		2	–	7	–	1
CCNY		–		1	–	5	–	1
Rankings from Dickinson System

The 1933 Boston College Eagles football team represented Boston College as an independent during the 1933 college football season. The Eagles were led by sixth-year head coach Joe McKenney and played their home games at Alumni Field in Chestnut Hill, Massachusetts. The team finished with a record of 8–1.

== Schedule ==
Date	Time	Opponent	Site	Result	Attendance	Source
September 30		Saint Anselm	Alumni Field; Chestnut Hill, MA	W 22–0		
October 7	2:30 p.m.	Loyola (MD)	Alumni Field; Chestnut Hill, MA	W 37–0		
October 12	2:30 p.m.	Centre	Alumni Field; Chestnut Hill, MA	W 6–0	15,000–20,000	
October 21	2:00 p.m.	at Fordham	Polo Grounds; New York, NY	L 6–32	20,000	
October 28	2:30 p.m.	Boston University	Alumni Field; Chestnut Hill, MA (rivalry)	W 25–0		
November 4	2:00 p.m.	Georgetown	Alumni Field; Chestnut Hill, MA	W 39–0		
November 11	2:00 p.m.	Villanova	Alumni Field; Chestnut Hill, MA	W 9–0	10,000	
November 18	2:00 p.m.	Western Maryland	Alumni Field; Chestnut Hill, MA	W 12–9		
December 2	2:00 p.m.	Holy Cross	Alumni Field; Chestnut Hill, MA (rivalry)	W 13–9	25,000	
All times are in Eastern time
