= 1933 Vermont Catamounts football team =

American college football season

1933 Vermont Catamounts football
- Conference: Independent
- Record: 3–5
- Head coach: John H. Burke (2nd season)
- Home stadium: Centennial Field

1933 Eastern college football independents records
	Conf.			Overall
Team	W	L	T	W		L		T
No. 7 Princeton		–		9	–	0	–	0
Duquesne		–		10	–	1	–	0
No. 9 Army		–		9	–	1	–	0
Boston College		–		8	–	1	–	0
Columbia		–		8	–	1	–	0
Pittsburgh		–		8	–	1	–	0
Colgate		–		6	–	1	–	1
Bucknell		–		7	–	2	–	0
Fordham		–		6	–	2	–	0
Tufts		–		6	–	2	–	0
Villanova		–		7	–	2	–	1
Harvard		–		5	–	2	–	1
Drexel		–		5	–	3	–	0
Massachusetts State		–		5	–	3	–	0
Temple		–		5	–	3	–	0
Manhattan		–		5	–	3	–	1
Cornell		–		4	–	3	–	0
Carnegie Tech		–		4	–	3	–	2
La Salle		–		3	–	3	–	2
Syracuse		–		4	–	4	–	0
Yale		–		4	–	4	–	0
Penn State		–		3	–	3	–	1
Brown		–		3	–	5	–	0
Vermont		–		3	–	5	–	0
Franklin & Marshall		–		4	–	5	–	0
NYU		–		2	–	4	–	1
Penn		–		2	–	4	–	1
Northeastern		–		1	–	3	–	1
Boston University		–		2	–	5	–	0
Washington & Jefferson		–		2	–	7	–	1
CCNY		–		1	–	5	–	1
Rankings from Dickinson System

The 1933 Vermont Catamounts football team was an American football team that represented the University of Vermont as an independent during the 1933 college football season. In their second year under head coach John H. Burke, the team compiled a 3–5 record.

== Schedule ==
Date	Opponent	Site	Result	Attendance	Source
September 30	Connecticut State	Centennial Field; Burlington, VT	W 36–6		
October 7	at Dartmouth	Memorial Field; Hanover, NH	L 6–39		
October 14	at Clarkson	Snell Field; Potsdam, NY	L 8–13		
October 21	at Boston University	Nickerson Field; Boston, MA	L 0–13		
October 28	New Hampshire	Centennial Field; Burlington, VT	W 13–0	3,000	
November 4	at Norwich	Sabine Field; Northfield, VT	W 19–0	3,000	
November 11	Saint Michael's	Centennial Field; Burlington, VT	L 0–13	2,000	
November 25	Middlebury	Centennial Field; Burlington, VT	L 13–19	3,000	
