= 1933 Temple Owls football team =

American college football season

1933 Temple Owls football
- Conference: Independent
- Record: 5–3
- Head coach: Pop Warner (1st season)
- Captain: Edgar Smith
- Home stadium: Temple Stadium

1933 Eastern college football independents records
	Conf.			Overall
Team	W	L	T	W		L		T
No. 7 Princeton		–		9	–	0	–	0
Duquesne		–		10	–	1	–	0
No. 9 Army		–		9	–	1	–	0
Boston College		–		8	–	1	–	0
Columbia		–		8	–	1	–	0
Pittsburgh		–		8	–	1	–	0
Colgate		–		6	–	1	–	1
Bucknell		–		7	–	2	–	0
Fordham		–		6	–	2	–	0
Tufts		–		6	–	2	–	0
Villanova		–		7	–	2	–	1
Harvard		–		5	–	2	–	1
Drexel		–		5	–	3	–	0
Massachusetts State		–		5	–	3	–	0
Temple		–		5	–	3	–	0
Manhattan		–		5	–	3	–	1
Cornell		–		4	–	3	–	0
Carnegie Tech		–		4	–	3	–	2
La Salle		–		3	–	3	–	2
Syracuse		–		4	–	4	–	0
Yale		–		4	–	4	–	0
Penn State		–		3	–	3	–	1
Brown		–		3	–	5	–	0
Vermont		–		3	–	5	–	0
Franklin & Marshall		–		4	–	5	–	0
NYU		–		2	–	4	–	1
Penn		–		2	–	4	–	1
Northeastern		–		1	–	3	–	1
Boston University		–		2	–	5	–	0
Washington & Jefferson		–		2	–	7	–	1
CCNY		–		1	–	5	–	1
Rankings from Dickinson System

The 1933 Temple Owls football team was an American football team that represented Temple University as an independent during the 1933 college football season. In its first season under head coach Pop Warner, the team compiled a 5–3 record and outscored opponents by a total of 110 to 96. The team played its home games at Temple Stadium in Philadelphia.

== Schedule ==
Date	Time	Opponent	Site	Result	Attendance	Source
September 29	8:30 p.m.	South Carolina	Temple Stadium; Philadelphia, PA	W 26–6	25,000	
October 7		Carnegie Tech	Temple Stadium; Philadelphia, PA	L 0–25		
October 13	8:30 p.m.	Haskell	Temple Stadium; Philadelphia, PA	W 31–0	20,000	
October 20		West Virginia	Temple Stadium; Philadelphia, PA	W 13–7	15,000	
October 28		at Bucknell	Memorial Stadium; Lewisburg, PA	L 7–20		
November 4		Drake	Temple Stadium; Philadelphia, PA	W 20–14		
November 18		Washington & Jefferson	Temple Stadium; Philadelphia, PA	W 13–0		
November 25		Villanova	Temple Stadium; Philadelphia, PA	L 0–24		
All times are in Eastern time
