= 1933 Massachusetts State Aggies football team =

American college football season

1933 Massachusetts State Aggies football
- Conference: Independent
- Record: 5–3
- Head coach: Mel Taube (3rd season)
- Home stadium: Alumni Field

1933 Eastern college football independents records
	Conf.			Overall
Team	W	L	T	W		L		T
No. 7 Princeton		–		9	–	0	–	0
Duquesne		–		10	–	1	–	0
No. 9 Army		–		9	–	1	–	0
Boston College		–		8	–	1	–	0
Columbia		–		8	–	1	–	0
Pittsburgh		–		8	–	1	–	0
Colgate		–		6	–	1	–	1
Bucknell		–		7	–	2	–	0
Fordham		–		6	–	2	–	0
Tufts		–		6	–	2	–	0
Villanova		–		7	–	2	–	1
Harvard		–		5	–	2	–	1
Drexel		–		5	–	3	–	0
Massachusetts State		–		5	–	3	–	0
Temple		–		5	–	3	–	0
Manhattan		–		5	–	3	–	1
Cornell		–		4	–	3	–	0
Carnegie Tech		–		4	–	3	–	2
La Salle		–		3	–	3	–	2
Syracuse		–		4	–	4	–	0
Yale		–		4	–	4	–	0
Penn State		–		3	–	3	–	1
Brown		–		3	–	5	–	0
Vermont		–		3	–	5	–	0
Franklin & Marshall		–		4	–	5	–	0
NYU		–		2	–	4	–	1
Penn		–		2	–	4	–	1
Northeastern		–		1	–	3	–	1
Boston University		–		2	–	5	–	0
Washington & Jefferson		–		2	–	7	–	1
CCNY		–		1	–	5	–	1
Rankings from Dickinson System

The 1933 Massachusetts State Aggies football team represented Massachusetts State College in the 1933 college football season. The team was coached by Mel Taube and played its home games at Alumni Field in Amherst, Massachusetts. Mass State finished the season with a record of 5–3.

== Schedule ==
Date	Opponent	Site	Result
October 7	Bowdoin	Alumni Field; Amherst, MA	W 14–0
October 14	Connecticut	Alumni Field; Amherst, MA (rivalry)	W 40–7
October 21	at Rhode Island State	Meade Stadium; Kingston, RI	W 14–12
October 28	Worcester Tech	Alumni Field; Amherst, MA	W 20–6
November 4	at Amherst	Pratt Field; Amherst, MA	L 0–14
November 11	at Saint Anselm	Goffstown, NH	L 0–7
November 18	at RPI	'86 Field; Troy, NY	W 20–6
November 25	Tufts	Alumni Field; Amherst, MA	L 0–13
