= 1933 CCNY Lavender football team =

American college football season

1933 CCNY Lavender football
- Conference: Independent
- Record: 1–5–1
- Head coach: Harold J. Parker (10th season)
- Home stadium: Lewisohn Stadium

1933 Eastern college football independents records
	Conf.			Overall
Team	W	L	T	W		L		T
No. 7 Princeton		–		9	–	0	–	0
Duquesne		–		10	–	1	–	0
No. 9 Army		–		9	–	1	–	0
Boston College		–		8	–	1	–	0
Columbia		–		8	–	1	–	0
Pittsburgh		–		8	–	1	–	0
Colgate		–		6	–	1	–	1
Bucknell		–		7	–	2	–	0
Fordham		–		6	–	2	–	0
Tufts		–		6	–	2	–	0
Villanova		–		7	–	2	–	1
Harvard		–		5	–	2	–	1
Drexel		–		5	–	3	–	0
Massachusetts State		–		5	–	3	–	0
Temple		–		5	–	3	–	0
Manhattan		–		5	–	3	–	1
Cornell		–		4	–	3	–	0
Carnegie Tech		–		4	–	3	–	2
La Salle		–		3	–	3	–	2
Syracuse		–		4	–	4	–	0
Yale		–		4	–	4	–	0
Penn State		–		3	–	3	–	1
Brown		–		3	–	5	–	0
Vermont		–		3	–	5	–	0
Franklin & Marshall		–		4	–	5	–	0
NYU		–		2	–	4	–	1
Penn		–		2	–	4	–	1
Northeastern		–		1	–	3	–	1
Boston University		–		2	–	5	–	0
Washington & Jefferson		–		2	–	7	–	1
CCNY		–		1	–	5	–	1
Rankings from Dickinson System

The 1933 CCNY Lavender football team was an American football team that represented the City College of New York (CCNY) as an independent during the 1933 college football season. In their tenth season under Harold J. Parker, the Lavender team compiled a 1–5–1 record.

== Schedule ==
Date	Opponent	Site	Result	Attendance	Source
September 30	Brooklyn	Lewisohn Stadium; New York, NY	W 18–12	6,000	
October 7	at RPI	'86 Field; Troy, NY	L 0–33		
October 14	Lebanon Valley	Lewisohn Stadium; New York, NY	L 0–32		
October 21	at Drexel	Drexel Field; Philadelphia, PA	L 0–32	1,500	
October 28	Lowell Textile	Lewisohn Stadium; New York, NY	T 0–0	2,000	
November 4	at Manhattan	Ebbets Field; Brooklyn, NY	L 0–24	3,500	
November 11	Providence	Lewisohn Stadium; New York, NY	L 6–39	1,500	
