= 1933 Syracuse Orangemen football team =

American college football season

1933 Syracuse Orangemen football
- Conference: Independent
- Record: 4–4
- Head coach: Vic Hanson (4th season)
- Captain: Francis Tisdale
- Home stadium: Archbold Stadium

1933 Eastern college football independents records
	Conf.			Overall
Team	W	L	T	W		L		T
No. 7 Princeton		–		9	–	0	–	0
Duquesne		–		10	–	1	–	0
No. 9 Army		–		9	–	1	–	0
Boston College		–		8	–	1	–	0
Columbia		–		8	–	1	–	0
Pittsburgh		–		8	–	1	–	0
Colgate		–		6	–	1	–	1
Bucknell		–		7	–	2	–	0
Fordham		–		6	–	2	–	0
Tufts		–		6	–	2	–	0
Villanova		–		7	–	2	–	1
Harvard		–		5	–	2	–	1
Drexel		–		5	–	3	–	0
Massachusetts State		–		5	–	3	–	0
Temple		–		5	–	3	–	0
Manhattan		–		5	–	3	–	1
Cornell		–		4	–	3	–	0
Carnegie Tech		–		4	–	3	–	2
La Salle		–		3	–	3	–	2
Syracuse		–		4	–	4	–	0
Yale		–		4	–	4	–	0
Penn State		–		3	–	3	–	1
Brown		–		3	–	5	–	0
Vermont		–		3	–	5	–	0
Franklin & Marshall		–		4	–	5	–	0
NYU		–		2	–	4	–	1
Penn		–		2	–	4	–	1
Northeastern		–		1	–	3	–	1
Boston University		–		2	–	5	–	0
Washington & Jefferson		–		2	–	7	–	1
CCNY		–		1	–	5	–	1
Rankings from Dickinson System

The 1933 Syracuse Orangemen football team represented Syracuse University as an independent during the 1933 college football season. The Orangemen were led by fourth-year head coach Vic Hanson and played their home games at Archbold Stadium in Syracuse, New York.

== Schedule ==
Date	Opponent	Site	Result	Attendance
October 7	Clarkson	Archbold Stadium; Syracuse, NY	W 52–0	15,000
October 14	Ohio Wesleyan	Archbold Stadium; Syracuse, NY	W 40–0	20,000
October 21	at Cornell	Schoellkopf Field; Ithaca, NY	W 14–7	26,000
October 28	at Michigan State	College Field; East Lansing, MI	L 3–27	9,000
November 4	Penn State	Archbold Stadium; Syracuse, NY (rivalry)	W 12–6	10,000
November 11	at Brown	Brown Stadium; Providence, RI	L 7–10	5,000
November 18	Colgate	Archbold Stadium; Syracuse, NY (rivalry)	L 3–13	16,000
November 25	at Columbia	Baker Field; New York, NY	L 0–16	30,000
