= 1933 Army Cadets football team =

American college football season

1933 Army Cadets football
- Conference: Independent
- Record: 9–1
- Head coach: Garrison H. Davidson (1st season)
- Captain: Harvey Jablonsky
- Home stadium: Michie Stadium

1933 Eastern college football independents records
	Conf.			Overall
Team	W	L	T	W		L		T
No. 7 Princeton		–		9	–	0	–	0
Duquesne		–		10	–	1	–	0
No. 9 Army		–		9	–	1	–	0
Boston College		–		8	–	1	–	0
Columbia		–		8	–	1	–	0
Pittsburgh		–		8	–	1	–	0
Colgate		–		6	–	1	–	1
Bucknell		–		7	–	2	–	0
Fordham		–		6	–	2	–	0
Tufts		–		6	–	2	–	0
Villanova		–		7	–	2	–	1
Harvard		–		5	–	2	–	1
Drexel		–		5	–	3	–	0
Massachusetts State		–		5	–	3	–	0
Temple		–		5	–	3	–	0
Manhattan		–		5	–	3	–	1
Cornell		–		4	–	3	–	0
Carnegie Tech		–		4	–	3	–	2
La Salle		–		3	–	3	–	2
Syracuse		–		4	–	4	–	0
Yale		–		4	–	4	–	0
Penn State		–		3	–	3	–	1
Brown		–		3	–	5	–	0
Vermont		–		3	–	5	–	0
Franklin & Marshall		–		4	–	5	–	0
NYU		–		2	–	4	–	1
Penn		–		2	–	4	–	1
Northeastern		–		1	–	3	–	1
Boston University		–		2	–	5	–	0
Washington & Jefferson		–		2	–	7	–	1
CCNY		–		1	–	5	–	1
Rankings from Dickinson System

The 1933 Army Cadets football team represented the United States Military Academy as an independent during the 1933 college football season. In their first year under head coach Garrison H. Davidson, the Cadets compiled a 9–1 record, shut out seven of their ten opponents, and outscored all opponents by a combined total of 227 to 26. In the annual Army–Navy Game, the Cadets defeated the Midshipmen 12–7. In the final game of the season at Yankee Stadium, the undefeated Cadets were upset by struggling Notre Dame, 13–12.

Four Army players were recognized on the All-America team. Halfback Jack Buckler received first-team honors from the Associated Press (AP), United Press (UP), Newspaper Enterprise Association (NEA), Central Press Association (CP), and New York Sun. Quarterback Paul Johnson received second-team honors from the AP and NEA. Guard Harvey Jablonsky received second-team honors from the NEA, CP, and International News Service (INS). End Peter James Kopcsak received third-team honors from the CP.

== Schedule ==
Date	Opponent	Site	Result	Attendance	Source
September 30	Mercer	Michie Stadium; West Point, NY	W 19–6		
October 7	VMI	Michie Stadium; West Point, NY	W 32–0	8,000	
October 14	Delaware	Michie Stadium; West Point, NY	W 52–0		
October 21	vs. Illinois	Cleveland, OH	W 6–0		
October 28	at Yale	Yale Bowl; New Haven, CT	W 21–0		
November 4	Coe	Michie Stadium; West Point, NY	W 34–0		
November 11	at Harvard	Harvard Stadium; Boston, MA	W 27–0		
November 18	Pennsylvania Military	Michie Stadium; West Point, NY	W 12–0		
November 25	vs. Navy	Franklin Field; Philadelphia, PA (Army–Navy Game)	W 12–7		
December 2	vs. Notre Dame	Yankee Stadium; Bronx, NY (rivalry)	L 12–13	73,594	
