= 1933 Bucknell Bison football team =

American college football season

1933 Bucknell Bison football
- Conference: Independent
- Record: 7–2
- Head coach: Carl Snavely (7th season)
- Home stadium: Memorial Stadium

1933 Eastern college football independents records
	Conf.			Overall
Team	W	L	T	W		L		T
No. 7 Princeton		–		9	–	0	–	0
Duquesne		–		10	–	1	–	0
No. 9 Army		–		9	–	1	–	0
Boston College		–		8	–	1	–	0
Columbia		–		8	–	1	–	0
Pittsburgh		–		8	–	1	–	0
Colgate		–		6	–	1	–	1
Bucknell		–		7	–	2	–	0
Fordham		–		6	–	2	–	0
Tufts		–		6	–	2	–	0
Villanova		–		7	–	2	–	1
Harvard		–		5	–	2	–	1
Drexel		–		5	–	3	–	0
Massachusetts State		–		5	–	3	–	0
Temple		–		5	–	3	–	0
Manhattan		–		5	–	3	–	1
Cornell		–		4	–	3	–	0
Carnegie Tech		–		4	–	3	–	2
La Salle		–		3	–	3	–	2
Syracuse		–		4	–	4	–	0
Yale		–		4	–	4	–	0
Penn State		–		3	–	3	–	1
Brown		–		3	–	5	–	0
Vermont		–		3	–	5	–	0
Franklin & Marshall		–		4	–	5	–	0
NYU		–		2	–	4	–	1
Penn		–		2	–	4	–	1
Northeastern		–		1	–	3	–	1
Boston University		–		2	–	5	–	0
Washington & Jefferson		–		2	–	7	–	1
CCNY		–		1	–	5	–	1
Rankings from Dickinson System

The 1933 Bucknell Bison football team was an American football team that represented Bucknell University as an independent during the 1933 college football season. In its seventh season under head coach Carl Snavely, the team compiled a 7–2 record.

The team played its home games at Memorial Stadium in Lewisburg, Pennsylvania.

== Schedule ==
Date	Opponent	Site	Result	Attendance	Source
September 22	Waynesburg	Memorial Stadium; Lewisburg, PA	W 46–7		
September 29	Lebanon Valley	Memorial Stadium; Lewisburg, PA	W 34–0		
October 6	at Duquesne	Forbes Field; Pittsburgh, PA	L 0–6	> 18,000	
October 14	at Villanova	Villanova Stadium; Villanova, PA	W 19–17		
October 21	at Lafayette	Fisher Field; Easton, PA	W 21–0		
October 28	Temple^{†}	Memorial Stadium; Lewisburg, PA	W 20–7		
November 4	vs. Western Maryland	Scranton, PA	L 13–14	4,000	
November 11	Furman	Memorial Stadium; Lewisburg, PA	W 14–0		
November 25	Washington & Jefferson	Memorial Stadium; Lewisburg, PA	W 38–6		
^{†}Homecoming
