= 1933 Drexel Dragons football team =

American college football season

1933 Drexel Dragons football
- Conference: Independent
- Record: 5–3
- Head coach: Walter Halas (7th season)
- Captain: Ted Markle
- Home stadium: Drexel Field

1933 Eastern college football independents records
| | Conf. | | | Overall |
| Team | W | L | T | W | | L | | T |
|---|---|---|---|---|---|---|---|---|
| No. 7 Princeton | | – | | 9 | – | 0 | – | 0 |
| Duquesne | | – | | 10 | – | 1 | – | 0 |
| No. 9 Army | | – | | 9 | – | 1 | – | 0 |
| Boston College | | – | | 8 | – | 1 | – | 0 |
| Columbia | | – | | 8 | – | 1 | – | 0 |
| Pittsburgh | | – | | 8 | – | 1 | – | 0 |
| Colgate | | – | | 6 | – | 1 | – | 1 |
| Bucknell | | – | | 7 | – | 2 | – | 0 |
| Fordham | | – | | 6 | – | 2 | – | 0 |
| Tufts | | – | | 6 | – | 2 | – | 0 |
| Villanova | | – | | 7 | – | 2 | – | 1 |
| Harvard | | – | | 5 | – | 2 | – | 1 |
| Drexel | | – | | 5 | – | 3 | – | 0 |
| Massachusetts State | | – | | 5 | – | 3 | – | 0 |
| Temple | | – | | 5 | – | 3 | – | 0 |
| Manhattan | | – | | 5 | – | 3 | – | 1 |
| Cornell | | – | | 4 | – | 3 | – | 0 |
| Carnegie Tech | | – | | 4 | – | 3 | – | 2 |
| La Salle | | – | | 3 | – | 3 | – | 2 |
| Syracuse | | – | | 4 | – | 4 | – | 0 |
| Yale | | – | | 4 | – | 4 | – | 0 |
| Penn State | | – | | 3 | – | 3 | – | 1 |
| Brown | | – | | 3 | – | 5 | – | 0 |
| Vermont | | – | | 3 | – | 5 | – | 0 |
| Franklin & Marshall | | – | | 4 | – | 5 | – | 0 |
| NYU | | – | | 2 | – | 4 | – | 1 |
| Penn | | – | | 2 | – | 4 | – | 1 |
| Northeastern | | – | | 1 | – | 3 | – | 1 |
| Boston University | | – | | 2 | – | 5 | – | 0 |
| Washington & Jefferson | | – | | 2 | – | 7 | – | 1 |
| CCNY | | – | | 1 | – | 5 | – | 1 |
Rankings from Dickinson System

1933 Drexel Dragons football team represented Drexel Institute—now known as Drexel University—in the 1933 college football season. Led by Walter Halas in his seventh season as head coach, the team compiled a record of 5–3.

== Schedule ==
| Date | Time | Opponent | Site | Result | Attendance | Source |
|---|---|---|---|---|---|---|
| September 30 | | at Lehigh | Taylor Stadium; Bethlehem, PA | L 0–19 | | |
| October 7 | | West Chester | Drexel Field; Philadelphia, PA | W 13–7 | | |
| October 14 | | at Juniata | Huntingdon, PA | W 12–7 | | |
| October 21 | | CCNY | Drexel Field; Philadelphia, PA | W 32–0 | 1,500 | |
| October 28 | | Ursinus | Drexel Field; Philadelphia, PA | L 0–7 | | |
| November 4 | | Delaware | Drexel Field; Philadelphia, PA | W 6–0 | 3,500 | |
| November 11 | | Susquehanna | Drexel Field; Philadelphia, PA | W 7–6 | | |
| November 18 | 2:00 pm | at Lebanon Valley | Bethlehem Steel Field; Annville, PA | L 6–16 | 1,200 | |
All times are in Eastern time

== Roster ==
1933 Drexel Dragons football team roster
Players
Coaches
Offense

| Pos. | # | Name | Class |
|---|---|---|---|
| TE | 59 | Harry Brevda |
| OT | 5 | John Bear |
| G | 18 | Henry Kelly |
| C | 21 | Joseph Guggenheim |
| G | 1 | Ted Markle (C) |
| OT | 44 | Harry Martin |
| TE | 11 | Arthur Mered Hoff | So |
| HB | 85 | Charlie Knapp | So |
| HB | 9 | George Stevens | Fr |
| FB | 31 | Ralph Petchik |
| QB | 24 | Myron Fleming |
| QB | 86 | Frank Burns |
| HB | 12 | Robert Callahan |
| FB | 22 | Edward Doolittle |
| C | 34 | Daniel Dugan |
| OT | 10 | Joseph Finnerty |
| OT | 28 | Albert Fitzgerald | Fr |
| G | 39 | Charles Foltz | So |
| HB | 70 | Harry Fox | Fr |
| G | 17 | Edward Gegenheimer |
| G | 15 | Williams Gittler |
| OT | 7 | John Goheen |
| C | 30 | Charles Holland |
| FB | 38 | Frank Jankuskas |
| HB | 16 | Robert Kennedy |
| HB | 84 | Robert Link |
| G | 4 | Thomas Lukens |
| C | 29 | Fred Martin |
| FB | 23 | Theodore Pohlig |
| HB | 65 | Samuel Potter | So |
| TE | 14 | James Reynolds |
| TE | 19 | Joseph Rhile | Fr |
| G | 46 | George Smullen |
| QB | 66 | Ross Tippin | Fr |
| TE | 40 | Henry Wallace |
| HB | 42 | Raymond Wirth |
| TE | 45 | William Wright |

Defense

| Pos. | # | Name | Class |

Special teams

| Pos. | # | Name | Class |

Head coach

- Walter Halas (Illinois)

Coordinators/assistant coaches

- Rae Crowther (Colgate)
- Albert H. Repscha (Maine)

Legend

- (C) Team captain
- (S) Suspended
- (I) Ineligible
- Injured
- Redshirt
