= 1933 La Salle Explorers football team =

American college football season

1933 La Salle Explorers football
- Conference: Independent
- Record: 3–3–2
- Head coach: Marty Brill (1st season)
- Home stadium: Philadelphia Ball Park; Finnesey Field

1933 Eastern college football independents records
	Conf.			Overall
Team	W	L	T	W		L		T
No. 7 Princeton		–		9	–	0	–	0
Duquesne		–		10	–	1	–	0
No. 9 Army		–		9	–	1	–	0
Boston College		–		8	–	1	–	0
Columbia		–		8	–	1	–	0
Pittsburgh		–		8	–	1	–	0
Colgate		–		6	–	1	–	1
Bucknell		–		7	–	2	–	0
Fordham		–		6	–	2	–	0
Tufts		–		6	–	2	–	0
Villanova		–		7	–	2	–	1
Harvard		–		5	–	2	–	1
Drexel		–		5	–	3	–	0
Massachusetts State		–		5	–	3	–	0
Temple		–		5	–	3	–	0
Manhattan		–		5	–	3	–	1
Cornell		–		4	–	3	–	0
Carnegie Tech		–		4	–	3	–	2
La Salle		–		3	–	3	–	2
Syracuse		–		4	–	4	–	0
Yale		–		4	–	4	–	0
Penn State		–		3	–	3	–	1
Brown		–		3	–	5	–	0
Vermont		–		3	–	5	–	0
Franklin & Marshall		–		4	–	5	–	0
NYU		–		2	–	4	–	1
Penn		–		2	–	4	–	1
Northeastern		–		1	–	3	–	1
Boston University		–		2	–	5	–	0
Washington & Jefferson		–		2	–	7	–	1
CCNY		–		1	–	5	–	1
Rankings from Dickinson System

The 1933 La Salle Explorers football team was an American football team that represented La Salle College (now known as La Salle University) as an independent during the 1933 college football season. In their first year under head coach Marty Brill, the Explorers compiled a 3–3–2 record.

== Schedule ==
Date	Opponent	Site	Result	Attendance	Source
September 30	at Catholic University	Brookland Stadium; Washington, DC	L 6–37	8,000	
October 8	at Niagara	Varsity Stadium; Lewiston, NY	T 7–7	1,500	
October 14	Albright	Philadelphia Ball Park; Philadelphia, PA	W 12–0		
October 21	St. Bonaventure	Philadelphia Ball Park; Philadelphia, PA	T 13–13		
October 28	at West Chester	Wayne Field; West Chester, PA	W 6–0	3,000	
November 4	St. Thomas (PA)	Finnesey Field; Philadelphia, PA	L 0–13		
November 11	at Mount St. Mary's	Emmitsburg, MD	W 7–6		
November 18	at Saint Vincent (PA)	Bearcat Stadium; Latrobe, PA	L 7–12		
