= 1933 Villanova Wildcats football team =

American college football season

1933 Villanova Wildcats football
- Conference: Independent
- Record: 7–2–1
- Head coach: Harry Stuhldreher (9th season)
- Home stadium: Villanova Stadium

1933 Eastern college football independents records
	Conf.			Overall
Team	W	L	T	W		L		T
No. 7 Princeton		–		9	–	0	–	0
Duquesne		–		10	–	1	–	0
No. 9 Army		–		9	–	1	–	0
Boston College		–		8	–	1	–	0
Columbia		–		8	–	1	–	0
Pittsburgh		–		8	–	1	–	0
Colgate		–		6	–	1	–	1
Bucknell		–		7	–	2	–	0
Fordham		–		6	–	2	–	0
Tufts		–		6	–	2	–	0
Villanova		–		7	–	2	–	1
Harvard		–		5	–	2	–	1
Drexel		–		5	–	3	–	0
Massachusetts State		–		5	–	3	–	0
Temple		–		5	–	3	–	0
Manhattan		–		5	–	3	–	1
Cornell		–		4	–	3	–	0
Carnegie Tech		–		4	–	3	–	2
La Salle		–		3	–	3	–	2
Syracuse		–		4	–	4	–	0
Yale		–		4	–	4	–	0
Penn State		–		3	–	3	–	1
Brown		–		3	–	5	–	0
Vermont		–		3	–	5	–	0
Franklin & Marshall		–		4	–	5	–	0
NYU		–		2	–	4	–	1
Penn		–		2	–	4	–	1
Northeastern		–		1	–	3	–	1
Boston University		–		2	–	5	–	0
Washington & Jefferson		–		2	–	7	–	1
CCNY		–		1	–	5	–	1
Rankings from Dickinson System

The 1933 Villanova Wildcats football team represented the Villanova University as an independent during the 1933 college football season. The head coach was Harry Stuhldreher, coaching his ninth season with the Wildcats. The team played their home games at Villanova Stadium in Villanova, Pennsylvania.

== Schedule ==
Date	Time	Opponent	Site	Result	Attendance	Source
September 23		West Chester	Villanova Stadium; Villanova, PA	W 45–0		
September 30		Ursinus	Villanova Stadium; Villanova, PA	T 7–7		
October 7		at South Carolina	State Fairgrounds; Columbia, SC	W 15–6	6,000	
October 14		Bucknell	Villanova Stadium; Villanova, PA	L 17–19		
October 24		Gettysburg	Villanova Stadium; Villanova, PA	W 40–0		
October 28		at Manhattan	Ebbets Field; Brooklyn, NY	W 47–0		
November 7		at Albright	Reading, PA	W 21–0		
November 11	2:00 p.m.	at Boston College	Alumni Field; Chestnut Hill, MA	L 0–9	10,000	
November 25		at Temple	Philadelphia, PA	W 24–0		
November 25		at Rutgers	Neilson Field; New Brunswick, NJ	W 18–13		
All times are in Eastern time
