= 1933 Carnegie Tech Tartans football team =

American college football season

1933 Carnegie Tech Tartans football
- Conference: Independent
- Record: 4–3–2
- Head coach: Howard Harpster (1st season)
- Home stadium: Pitt Stadium

1933 Eastern college football independents records
	Conf.			Overall
Team	W	L	T	W		L		T
No. 7 Princeton		–		9	–	0	–	0
Duquesne		–		10	–	1	–	0
No. 9 Army		–		9	–	1	–	0
Boston College		–		8	–	1	–	0
Columbia		–		8	–	1	–	0
Pittsburgh		–		8	–	1	–	0
Colgate		–		6	–	1	–	1
Bucknell		–		7	–	2	–	0
Fordham		–		6	–	2	–	0
Tufts		–		6	–	2	–	0
Villanova		–		7	–	2	–	1
Harvard		–		5	–	2	–	1
Drexel		–		5	–	3	–	0
Massachusetts State		–		5	–	3	–	0
Temple		–		5	–	3	–	0
Manhattan		–		5	–	3	–	1
Cornell		–		4	–	3	–	0
Carnegie Tech		–		4	–	3	–	2
La Salle		–		3	–	3	–	2
Syracuse		–		4	–	4	–	0
Yale		–		4	–	4	–	0
Penn State		–		3	–	3	–	1
Brown		–		3	–	5	–	0
Vermont		–		3	–	5	–	0
Franklin & Marshall		–		4	–	5	–	0
NYU		–		2	–	4	–	1
Penn		–		2	–	4	–	1
Northeastern		–		1	–	3	–	1
Boston University		–		2	–	5	–	0
Washington & Jefferson		–		2	–	7	–	1
CCNY		–		1	–	5	–	1
Rankings from Dickinson System

The 1933 Carnegie Tech Tartans football team represented the Carnegie Institute of Technology—now known as Carnegie Mellon University—as an independent during the 1933 college football season. Led by first-year head coach Howard Harpster, the Tartans compiled a record of 4–3–2.

== Schedule ==
Date	Opponent	Site	Result	Attendance	Source
October 7	at Temple	Temple Stadium; Philadelphia, PA	W 25–0		
October 14	Xavier	Pitt Stadium; Pittsburgh, PA	W 3–0	10,000	
October 21	Notre Dame	Pitt Stadium; Pittsburgh, PA	W 7–0	57,000	
October 28	at Washington & Jefferson	Cameron Stadium; Washington, PA	T 0–0		
November 4	at Purdue	Ross–Ade Stadium; West Lafayette, IN	L 7–17	18,000	
November 11	at Michigan State	College Field; East Lansing, MI	T 0–0		
November 18	at Georgetown	Griffith Stadium; Washington, DC	W 19–0		
November 25	at NYU	Yankee Stadium; Bronx, NY	L 0–7	15,000	
November 30	at Pittsburgh	Pitt Stadium; Pittsburgh, PA	L 0–16	42,000	
