= 1933 Boston University Terriers football team =

American college football season

1933 Boston University Terriers football
- Conference: Independent
- Record: 2–5
- Head coach: John Harmon (1st season)
- Home stadium: Nickerson Field

1933 Eastern college football independents records
	Conf.			Overall
Team	W	L	T	W		L		T
No. 7 Princeton		–		9	–	0	–	0
Duquesne		–		10	–	1	–	0
No. 9 Army		–		9	–	1	–	0
Boston College		–		8	–	1	–	0
Columbia		–		8	–	1	–	0
Pittsburgh		–		8	–	1	–	0
Colgate		–		6	–	1	–	1
Bucknell		–		7	–	2	–	0
Fordham		–		6	–	2	–	0
Tufts		–		6	–	2	–	0
Villanova		–		7	–	2	–	1
Harvard		–		5	–	2	–	1
Drexel		–		5	–	3	–	0
Massachusetts State		–		5	–	3	–	0
Temple		–		5	–	3	–	0
Manhattan		–		5	–	3	–	1
Cornell		–		4	–	3	–	0
Carnegie Tech		–		4	–	3	–	2
La Salle		–		3	–	3	–	2
Syracuse		–		4	–	4	–	0
Yale		–		4	–	4	–	0
Penn State		–		3	–	3	–	1
Brown		–		3	–	5	–	0
Vermont		–		3	–	5	–	0
Franklin & Marshall		–		4	–	5	–	0
NYU		–		2	–	4	–	1
Penn		–		2	–	4	–	1
Northeastern		–		1	–	3	–	1
Boston University		–		2	–	5	–	0
Washington & Jefferson		–		2	–	7	–	1
CCNY		–		1	–	5	–	1
Rankings from Dickinson System

The 1933 Boston University Terriers football team was an American football team that represented Boston University as an independent during the 1933 college football season. In its first and only season under head coach John Harmon, the team compiled a 2–5 record and was outscored by a total of 105 to 41.

== Schedule ==
Date	Opponent	Site	Result	Attendance	Source
September 30	Middlebury	Nickerson Field; Auburndale, MA	L 0–7		
October 7	at New Hampshire	Memorial Field; Durham, NH	L 6–35		
October 14	Colby	Nickerson Field; Auburndale, MA	W 9–7		
October 21	Vermont	Nickerson Field; Auburndale, MA	W 13–0		
October 28	at Boston College	Alumni Field; Chestnut Hill, MA (rivalry)	L 0–25		
November 4	Boston University alumni	Nickerson Field; Auburndale, MA	L 7–12		
November 11	at Tufts	Tufts Oval; Medford, MA	L 6–19		
