= 1933 Northeastern Huskies football team =

American college football season

1933 Northeastern Huskies football
- Conference: Independent
- Record: 1–3–1
- Head coach: Alfred McCoy (1st season)
- Captain: Brad Johnson
- Home stadium: Kent Street Field

1933 Eastern college football independents records
	Conf.			Overall
Team	W	L	T	W		L		T
No. 7 Princeton		–		9	–	0	–	0
Duquesne		–		10	–	1	–	0
No. 9 Army		–		9	–	1	–	0
Boston College		–		8	–	1	–	0
Columbia		–		8	–	1	–	0
Pittsburgh		–		8	–	1	–	0
Colgate		–		6	–	1	–	1
Bucknell		–		7	–	2	–	0
Fordham		–		6	–	2	–	0
Tufts		–		6	–	2	–	0
Villanova		–		7	–	2	–	1
Harvard		–		5	–	2	–	1
Drexel		–		5	–	3	–	0
Massachusetts State		–		5	–	3	–	0
Temple		–		5	–	3	–	0
Manhattan		–		5	–	3	–	1
Cornell		–		4	–	3	–	0
Carnegie Tech		–		4	–	3	–	2
La Salle		–		3	–	3	–	2
Syracuse		–		4	–	4	–	0
Yale		–		4	–	4	–	0
Penn State		–		3	–	3	–	1
Brown		–		3	–	5	–	0
Vermont		–		3	–	5	–	0
Franklin & Marshall		–		4	–	5	–	0
NYU		–		2	–	4	–	1
Penn		–		2	–	4	–	1
Northeastern		–		1	–	3	–	1
Boston University		–		2	–	5	–	0
Washington & Jefferson		–		2	–	7	–	1
CCNY		–		1	–	5	–	1
Rankings from Dickinson System

The 1933 Northeastern Huskies football team represented Northeastern University during the 1933 college football season. It was the program's first-ever season and they finished with a record of 1–3–1. Their head coach was Alfred McCoy and their captain was Brad Johnson.

== Schedule ==
Date	Opponent	Site	Result
October 7	Saint Anselm	Kent Street Field; Brookline, MA	L 6–19
October 14	at Saint Michael's	Winooski, VT	W 9–0
October 21	Colby	Kent Street Field; Brookline, MA	L 6–12
October 28	Norwich	Kent Street Field; Brookline, MA	T 7–7
November 11	Arnold	Kent Street Field; Brookline, MA	L 12–13
