= 1933 NYU Violets football team =

American college football season

1933 NYU Violets football
- Conference: Independent
- Record: 2–4–1
- Head coach: Howard Cann (2nd season)
- Home stadium: Yankee Stadium

1933 Eastern college football independents records
	Conf.			Overall
Team	W	L	T	W		L		T
No. 7 Princeton		–		9	–	0	–	0
Duquesne		–		10	–	1	–	0
No. 9 Army		–		9	–	1	–	0
Boston College		–		8	–	1	–	0
Columbia		–		8	–	1	–	0
Pittsburgh		–		8	–	1	–	0
Colgate		–		6	–	1	–	1
Bucknell		–		7	–	2	–	0
Fordham		–		6	–	2	–	0
Tufts		–		6	–	2	–	0
Villanova		–		7	–	2	–	1
Harvard		–		5	–	2	–	1
Drexel		–		5	–	3	–	0
Massachusetts State		–		5	–	3	–	0
Temple		–		5	–	3	–	0
Manhattan		–		5	–	3	–	1
Cornell		–		4	–	3	–	0
Carnegie Tech		–		4	–	3	–	2
La Salle		–		3	–	3	–	2
Syracuse		–		4	–	4	–	0
Yale		–		4	–	4	–	0
Penn State		–		3	–	3	–	1
Brown		–		3	–	5	–	0
Vermont		–		3	–	5	–	0
Franklin & Marshall		–		4	–	5	–	0
NYU		–		2	–	4	–	1
Penn		–		2	–	4	–	1
Northeastern		–		1	–	3	–	1
Boston University		–		2	–	5	–	0
Washington & Jefferson		–		2	–	7	–	1
CCNY		–		1	–	5	–	1
Rankings from Dickinson System

The 1933 NYU Violets football team was an American football team that represented New York University as an independent during the 1933 college football season. In their second year under head coach Howard Cann, the team compiled a 2–4–1 record.

== Schedule ==
Date	Opponent	Site	Result	Attendance	Source
October 7	West Virginia Wesleyan	Yankee Stadium; Bronx, NY	L 0–3	12,000	
October 14	Lafayette	Yankee Stadium; Bronx, NY	W 13–12	12,000	
October 21	Colgate	Yankee Stadium; Bronx, NY	L 0–7	25,000	
October 28	at Georgia	Sanford Stadium; Athens, GA	L 0–25	25,000	
November 11	vs. Fordham	Yankee Stadium; Bronx, NY	L 12–20	30,000	
November 18	Rutgers	Yankee Stadium; Bronx, NY	T 6–6	15,000	
November 25	Carnegie Tech	Yankee Stadium; Bronx, NY	W 7–0	15,000	
