= 1933 Colgate Red Raiders football team =

American college football season

1933 Colgate Red Raiders football
- Conference: Independent
- Record: 6–1–1
- Head coach: Andrew Kerr (5th season)
- Captain: Winston Anderson
- Home stadium: Whitnall Field

1933 Eastern college football independents records
	Conf.			Overall
Team	W	L	T	W		L		T
No. 7 Princeton		–		9	–	0	–	0
Duquesne		–		10	–	1	–	0
No. 9 Army		–		9	–	1	–	0
Boston College		–		8	–	1	–	0
Columbia		–		8	–	1	–	0
Pittsburgh		–		8	–	1	–	0
Colgate		–		6	–	1	–	1
Bucknell		–		7	–	2	–	0
Fordham		–		6	–	2	–	0
Tufts		–		6	–	2	–	0
Villanova		–		7	–	2	–	1
Harvard		–		5	–	2	–	1
Drexel		–		5	–	3	–	0
Massachusetts State		–		5	–	3	–	0
Temple		–		5	–	3	–	0
Manhattan		–		5	–	3	–	1
Cornell		–		4	–	3	–	0
Carnegie Tech		–		4	–	3	–	2
La Salle		–		3	–	3	–	2
Syracuse		–		4	–	4	–	0
Yale		–		4	–	4	–	0
Penn State		–		3	–	3	–	1
Brown		–		3	–	5	–	0
Vermont		–		3	–	5	–	0
Franklin & Marshall		–		4	–	5	–	0
NYU		–		2	–	4	–	1
Penn		–		2	–	4	–	1
Northeastern		–		1	–	3	–	1
Boston University		–		2	–	5	–	0
Washington & Jefferson		–		2	–	7	–	1
CCNY		–		1	–	5	–	1
Rankings from Dickinson System

The 1933 Colgate Red Raiders football team was an American football team that represented Colgate University as an independent during the 1933 college football season. In its fifth season under head coach Andrew Kerr, the team compiled a 6–1–1 record, shut out five of eight opponents, and outscored all opponents by a total of 189 to 12. Winston Anderson was the team captain. The team won the 200th game in program history against NYU at Yankee Stadium. The team played its home games on Whitnall Field in Hamilton, New York.

== Schedule ==
Date	Opponent	Site	Result	Attendance	Source
October 7	St. Lawrence	Whitnall Field; Hamilton, NY	W 47–0		
October 14	Rutgers	Whitnall Field; Hamilton, NY	W 25–2		
October 21	at NYU	Yankee Stadium; Bronx, NY	W 7–0	25,000	
October 28	Lafayette	Whitnall Field; Hamilton, NY	T 0–0		
November 4	vs. Tulane	Yankee Stadium; Bronx, NY	L 0–7	20,000	
November 11	Ohio Northern	Whitnall Field; Hamilton, NY	W 72–0		
November 18	at Syracuse	Archbold Stadium; Syracuse, NY (rivalry)	W 13–3	16,000	
November 25	at Brown	Andrews Field; Providence, RI	W 25–0		
