= 1933 Fordham Rams football team =

American college football season

1933 Fordham Rams football
- Conference: Independent
- Record: 6–2
- Head coach: Jim Crowley (1st season)
- Captain: Ed Danowski
- Home stadium: Fordham Field, Murphy Field, Polo Grounds, Yankee Stadium

1933 Eastern college football independents records
	Conf.			Overall
Team	W	L	T	W		L		T
No. 7 Princeton		–		9	–	0	–	0
Duquesne		–		10	–	1	–	0
No. 9 Army		–		9	–	1	–	0
Boston College		–		8	–	1	–	0
Columbia		–		8	–	1	–	0
Pittsburgh		–		8	–	1	–	0
Colgate		–		6	–	1	–	1
Bucknell		–		7	–	2	–	0
Fordham		–		6	–	2	–	0
Tufts		–		6	–	2	–	0
Villanova		–		7	–	2	–	1
Harvard		–		5	–	2	–	1
Drexel		–		5	–	3	–	0
Massachusetts State		–		5	–	3	–	0
Temple		–		5	–	3	–	0
Manhattan		–		5	–	3	–	1
Cornell		–		4	–	3	–	0
Carnegie Tech		–		4	–	3	–	2
La Salle		–		3	–	3	–	2
Syracuse		–		4	–	4	–	0
Yale		–		4	–	4	–	0
Penn State		–		3	–	3	–	1
Brown		–		3	–	5	–	0
Vermont		–		3	–	5	–	0
Franklin & Marshall		–		4	–	5	–	0
NYU		–		2	–	4	–	1
Penn		–		2	–	4	–	1
Northeastern		–		1	–	3	–	1
Boston University		–		2	–	5	–	0
Washington & Jefferson		–		2	–	7	–	1
CCNY		–		1	–	5	–	1
Rankings from Dickinson System

The 1933 Fordham Rams football team was an American football team that represented Fordham University as an independent during the 1933 college football season. In its first year under head coach Jim Crowley, Fordham compiled a 6–2 record, shut out four of eight opponents, and outscored all opponents by a total of 195 to 40.

== Schedule ==
Date	Time	Opponent	Site	Result	Attendance	Source
September 30		Albright	Fordham Field; Bronx, NY	W 52–0		
October 7		Muhlenberg	Murphy Field; Bronx, NY	W 57–0		
October 14		West Virginia	Polo Grounds; New York, NY	W 20–0	18,000	
October 21	2:00 p.m.	Boston College	Polo Grounds; New York, NY	W 32–6	20,000	
October 28		Alabama	Polo Grounds; New York, NY	W 2–0	60,000	
November 4		at Saint Mary's	Kezar Stadium; San Francisco, CA	L 6–13	62,000	
November 11		NYU	Yankee Stadium; Bronx, NY	W 20–12	30,000	
November 18		Oregon State	Polo Grounds; New York, NY	L 6–9	40,000	
All times are in Eastern time
