= 1933 Columbia Lions football team =

American college football season

1933 Columbia Lions football

National champion (self-claimed) Rose Bowl champion

Rose Bowl, W 7–0 vs. Stanford
- Conference: Independent
- Record: 8–1
- Head coach: Lou Little (4th season)
- Offensive scheme: Single wing
- Captain: Cliff Montgomery
- Home stadium: Baker Field

1933 Eastern college football independents records
	Conf.			Overall
Team	W	L	T	W		L		T
No. 7 Princeton		–		9	–	0	–	0
Duquesne		–		10	–	1	–	0
No. 9 Army		–		9	–	1	–	0
Boston College		–		8	–	1	–	0
Columbia		–		8	–	1	–	0
Pittsburgh		–		8	–	1	–	0
Colgate		–		6	–	1	–	1
Bucknell		–		7	–	2	–	0
Fordham		–		6	–	2	–	0
Tufts		–		6	–	2	–	0
Villanova		–		7	–	2	–	1
Harvard		–		5	–	2	–	1
Drexel		–		5	–	3	–	0
Massachusetts State		–		5	–	3	–	0
Temple		–		5	–	3	–	0
Manhattan		–		5	–	3	–	1
Cornell		–		4	–	3	–	0
Carnegie Tech		–		4	–	3	–	2
La Salle		–		3	–	3	–	2
Syracuse		–		4	–	4	–	0
Yale		–		4	–	4	–	0
Penn State		–		3	–	3	–	1
Brown		–		3	–	5	–	0
Vermont		–		3	–	5	–	0
Franklin & Marshall		–		4	–	5	–	0
NYU		–		2	–	4	–	1
Penn		–		2	–	4	–	1
Northeastern		–		1	–	3	–	1
Boston University		–		2	–	5	–	0
Washington & Jefferson		–		2	–	7	–	1
CCNY		–		1	–	5	–	1
Rankings from Dickinson System

The 1933 Columbia Lions football team was an American football team that represented Columbia University as an independent during the 1933 college football season. In their fourth season under head coach Lou Little, the Lions compiled an 8–1 record and outscored opponents 179 to 45, with four shutouts.

The Lions' lone setback was a 20–0 loss to Fritz Crisler's undefeated national champion Princeton Tigers. The Lions concluded the 1933 season on New Year's Day in California with a 7–0 victory over Stanford in the mud in the Rose Bowl. The school claims a national championship for the season. This Rose Bowl, held 92 years ago, remains the most recent postseason game for any member of today's Ivy League, which began league play in 1956.

Team captain and quarterback Cliff Montgomery was later inducted into the College Football Hall of Fame.

== Schedule ==
Date	Opponent	Site	Result	Attendance	Source
October 7	Lehigh	Baker Field; New York, NY	W 39–0	16,000	
October 14	Virginia	Baker Field; New York, NY	W 15–6	10,000	
October 21	at Princeton	Palmer Stadium; Princeton, NJ	L 0–20	40,000	
October 28	Penn State	Baker Field; New York, NY	W 33–0		
November 4	at Cornell	Schoellkopf Field; Ithaca, NY (rivalry)	W 9–6		
November 11	Navy	Baker Field; New York, NY	W 14–7		
November 18	Lafayette	Baker Field; New York, NY	W 46–6		
November 25	Syracuse	Baker Field; New York, NY	W 16–0	30,000	
January 1, 1934	vs. Stanford	Rose Bowl; Pasadena, CA (Rose Bowl)	W 7–0	35,000	
