= 1933 Washington & Jefferson Presidents football team =

American college football season

1933 Washington & Jefferson Presidents football
- Conference: Independent
- Record: 2–7–1
- Head coach: Hank Day (2nd season)

1933 Eastern college football independents records
	Conf.			Overall
Team	W	L	T	W		L		T
No. 7 Princeton		–		9	–	0	–	0
Duquesne		–		10	–	1	–	0
No. 9 Army		–		9	–	1	–	0
Boston College		–		8	–	1	–	0
Columbia		–		8	–	1	–	0
Pittsburgh		–		8	–	1	–	0
Colgate		–		6	–	1	–	1
Bucknell		–		7	–	2	–	0
Fordham		–		6	–	2	–	0
Tufts		–		6	–	2	–	0
Villanova		–		7	–	2	–	1
Harvard		–		5	–	2	–	1
Drexel		–		5	–	3	–	0
Massachusetts State		–		5	–	3	–	0
Temple		–		5	–	3	–	0
Manhattan		–		5	–	3	–	1
Cornell		–		4	–	3	–	0
Carnegie Tech		–		4	–	3	–	2
La Salle		–		3	–	3	–	2
Syracuse		–		4	–	4	–	0
Yale		–		4	–	4	–	0
Penn State		–		3	–	3	–	1
Brown		–		3	–	5	–	0
Vermont		–		3	–	5	–	0
Franklin & Marshall		–		4	–	5	–	0
NYU		–		2	–	4	–	1
Penn		–		2	–	4	–	1
Northeastern		–		1	–	3	–	1
Boston University		–		2	–	5	–	0
Washington & Jefferson		–		2	–	7	–	1
CCNY		–		1	–	5	–	1
Rankings from Dickinson System

The 1933 Washington & Jefferson Presidents football team was an American football team that represented Washington & Jefferson College as an independent during the 1933 college football season. The team compiled a 2–7–1 record and was outscored by opponents by a total of 47 to 122. Hank Day was the head coach.

== Schedule ==
Date	Opponent	Site	Result	Attendance	Source
September 30	at Pittsburgh	Pitt Stadium; Pittsburgh, PA	L 0–9	15,000	
October 7	Waynesburg	Washington, PA	W 19–7		
October 13	at Detroit	University of Detroit Stadium; Detroit, MI	L 0–14	18,000	
October 20	at Xavier	Corcoran Field; Cincinnati, OH	W 8–0		
October 28	Carnegie Tech	Washington, PA	T 0–0		
November 4	Duquesne	Washington, PA	L 6–21	12,000	
November 11	at George Washington	Griffith Stadium; Washington, DC	L 6–13	7,500	
November 18	at Temple	Temple Stadium; Philadelphia, PA	L 0–13		
November 25	at Bucknell	Memorial Stadium; Lewisburg, PA	L 6–38		
November 30	at West Virginia	Mountaineer Field; Morgantown, WV	L 2–7	7,000	
