= 1933 Penn State Nittany Lions football team =

American college football season

1933 Penn State Nittany Lions football
- Conference: Independent
- Record: 3–3–1
- Head coach: Bob Higgins (4th season)
- Captain: Tom Slusser
- Home stadium: New Beaver Field

1933 Eastern college football independents records
	Conf.			Overall
Team	W	L	T	W		L		T
No. 7 Princeton		–		9	–	0	–	0
Duquesne		–		10	–	1	–	0
No. 9 Army		–		9	–	1	–	0
Boston College		–		8	–	1	–	0
Columbia		–		8	–	1	–	0
Pittsburgh		–		8	–	1	–	0
Colgate		–		6	–	1	–	1
Bucknell		–		7	–	2	–	0
Fordham		–		6	–	2	–	0
Tufts		–		6	–	2	–	0
Villanova		–		7	–	2	–	1
Harvard		–		5	–	2	–	1
Drexel		–		5	–	3	–	0
Massachusetts State		–		5	–	3	–	0
Temple		–		5	–	3	–	0
Manhattan		–		5	–	3	–	1
Cornell		–		4	–	3	–	0
Carnegie Tech		–		4	–	3	–	2
La Salle		–		3	–	3	–	2
Syracuse		–		4	–	4	–	0
Yale		–		4	–	4	–	0
Penn State		–		3	–	3	–	1
Brown		–		3	–	5	–	0
Vermont		–		3	–	5	–	0
Franklin & Marshall		–		4	–	5	–	0
NYU		–		2	–	4	–	1
Penn		–		2	–	4	–	1
Northeastern		–		1	–	3	–	1
Boston University		–		2	–	5	–	0
Washington & Jefferson		–		2	–	7	–	1
CCNY		–		1	–	5	–	1
Rankings from Dickinson System

The 1933 Penn State Nittany Lions football team represented the Pennsylvania State College as an independent during the 1933 college football season. The team was coached by Bob Higgins and played its home games in New Beaver Field in State College, Pennsylvania.

== Schedule ==
Date	Opponent	Site	Result	Attendance
October 7	Lebanon Valley	New Beaver Field; State College, PA	W 32–6	3,000
October 14	Muhlenberg	New Beaver Field; State College, PA	L 0–3	4,000
October 21	Lehigh^{†}	New Beaver Field; State College, PA	W 33–0	5,000
October 28	at Columbia	Baker Field; New York, NY	L 0–33	
November 4	at Syracuse	Archbold Stadium; Syracuse, NY (rivalry)	L 6–12	10,000
November 11	Johns Hopkins	New Beaver Field; State College, PA	W 40–6	5,000
November 18	at Penn	Franklin Field; Philadelphia, PA	T 6–6	20,000
^{†}Homecoming
