= 1933 Duquesne Dukes football team =

American college football season

1933 Duquesne Dukes football

Festival of Palms Bowl, W 33–7 vs. Miami (FL)
- Conference: Independent
- Record: 10–1
- Head coach: Elmer Layden (7th season)
- Home stadium: Forbes Field

1933 Eastern college football independents records
| | Conf. | | | Overall |
| Team | W | L | T | W | | L | | T |
|---|---|---|---|---|---|---|---|---|
| No. 7 Princeton | | – | | 9 | – | 0 | – | 0 |
| Duquesne | | – | | 10 | – | 1 | – | 0 |
| No. 9 Army | | – | | 9 | – | 1 | – | 0 |
| Boston College | | – | | 8 | – | 1 | – | 0 |
| Columbia | | – | | 8 | – | 1 | – | 0 |
| Pittsburgh | | – | | 8 | – | 1 | – | 0 |
| Colgate | | – | | 6 | – | 1 | – | 1 |
| Bucknell | | – | | 7 | – | 2 | – | 0 |
| Fordham | | – | | 6 | – | 2 | – | 0 |
| Tufts | | – | | 6 | – | 2 | – | 0 |
| Villanova | | – | | 7 | – | 2 | – | 1 |
| Harvard | | – | | 5 | – | 2 | – | 1 |
| Drexel | | – | | 5 | – | 3 | – | 0 |
| Massachusetts State | | – | | 5 | – | 3 | – | 0 |
| Temple | | – | | 5 | – | 3 | – | 0 |
| Manhattan | | – | | 5 | – | 3 | – | 1 |
| Cornell | | – | | 4 | – | 3 | – | 0 |
| Carnegie Tech | | – | | 4 | – | 3 | – | 2 |
| La Salle | | – | | 3 | – | 3 | – | 2 |
| Syracuse | | – | | 4 | – | 4 | – | 0 |
| Yale | | – | | 4 | – | 4 | – | 0 |
| Penn State | | – | | 3 | – | 3 | – | 1 |
| Brown | | – | | 3 | – | 5 | – | 0 |
| Vermont | | – | | 3 | – | 5 | – | 0 |
| Franklin & Marshall | | – | | 4 | – | 5 | – | 0 |
| NYU | | – | | 2 | – | 4 | – | 1 |
| Penn | | – | | 2 | – | 4 | – | 1 |
| Northeastern | | – | | 1 | – | 3 | – | 1 |
| Boston University | | – | | 2 | – | 5 | – | 0 |
| Washington & Jefferson | | – | | 2 | – | 7 | – | 1 |
| CCNY | | – | | 1 | – | 5 | – | 1 |
Rankings from Dickinson System

The 1933 Duquesne Dukes football team was an American football team that represented Duquesne University as an independent during the 1933 college football season. In its seventh and final season under head coach Elmer Layden, Duquesne compiled a 10–1 record, outscored opponents by a total of 206 to 33, and defeated the Miami Hurricanes in the Festival of Palms Bowl.

Guard George Rado was chosen by the Associated Press (AP) as a first-team player on the 1933 All-Eastern football team. Other key players included tackles Steve Sinko and Armand Niccolai, halfback Howard O'Dell, and Isadore Weinstock.

Layden left Duquesne in December 1933 to become head coach at Notre Dame.

The team played its home games at Forbes Field in Pittsburgh, Pennsylvania.

== Schedule ==
| Date | Opponent | Site | Result | Attendance | Source |
|---|---|---|---|---|---|
| September 15 | Waynesburg | Forbes Field; Pittsburgh, PA | W 18–6 | 12,000 | |
| September 22 | West Virginia Wesleyan | Forbes Field; Pittsburgh, PA | W 25–0 | 7,500 | |
| September 29 | West Virginia | Forbes Field; Pittsburgh, PA | W 19–7 | 22,000 | |
| October 6 | Bucknell | Forbes Field; Pittsburgh, PA | W 6–0 | > 18,000 | |
| October 13 | Western Maryland | Forbes Field; Pittsburgh, PA | W 13–0 | 10,000 | |
| October 20 | Detroit | Forbes Field; Pittsburgh, PA | W 14–0 | > 25,000 | |
| October 27 | Westminster (PA) | Forbes Field; Pittsburgh, PA | W 31–0 | 2,500 | |
| November 4 | at Washington & Jefferson | College Field; Washington, PA | W 21–6 | 12,000 | |
| November 11 | at Pittsburgh | Pitt Stadium; Pittsburgh, PA | L 0–7 | 60,000 | |
| November 25 | Geneva | Forbes Field; Pittsburgh, PA | W 26–0 | 5,000 | |
| January 1, 1934 | at Miami (FL) | Moore Park; Miami, FL (Festival of Palms Bowl) | W 33–7 | 10,000 | |
