= 1933 college football season =

American college football season

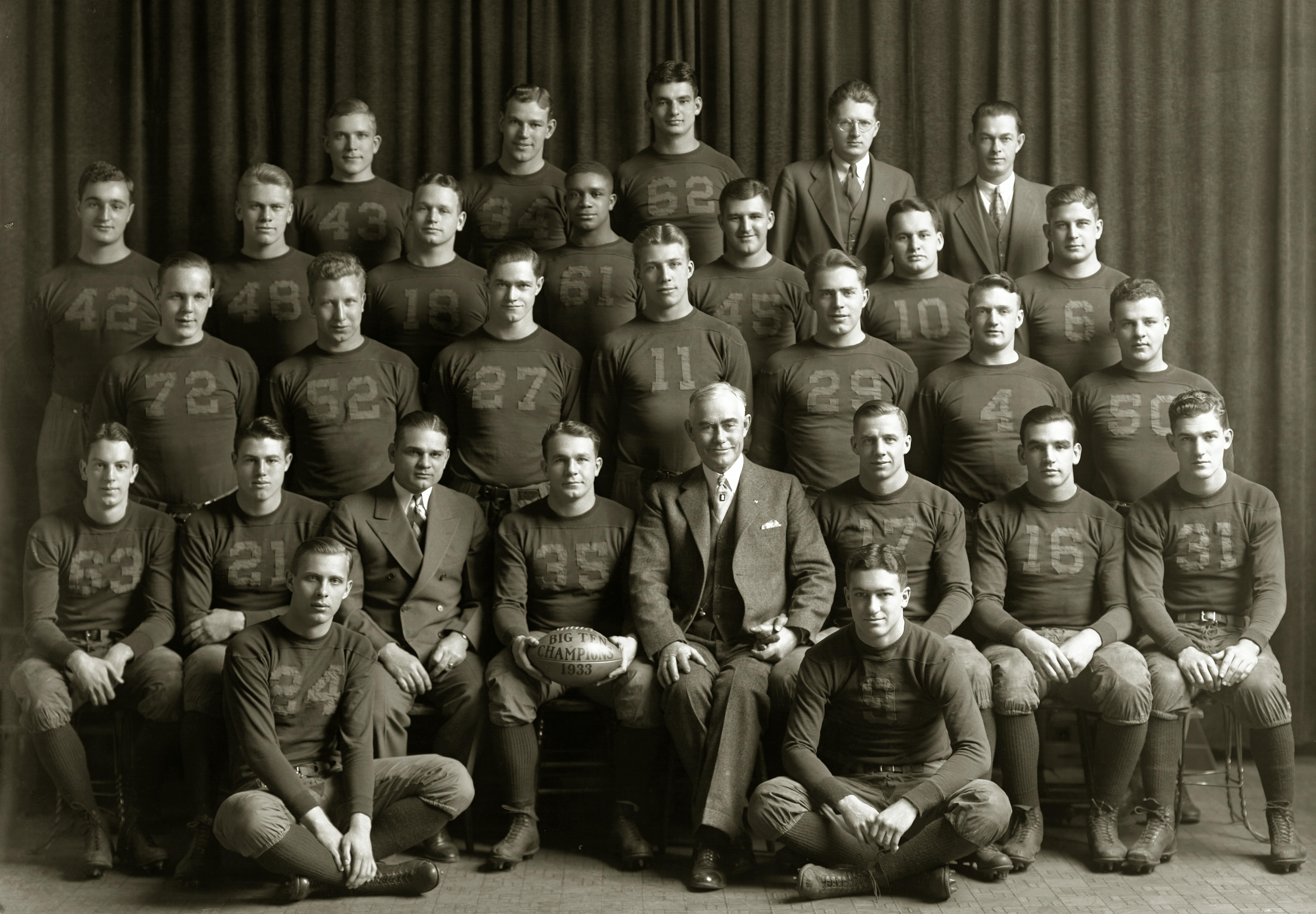
- Michigan, champions per most rankings
- Number of bowls: 2
- Bowl games: January 1, 1934
- Champion(s): Michigan (Note: per Boand System, Dickinson System (received Rockne Trophy), Houlgate System, Berryman QPRS, Billingsley Report, College Football Researchers Association, Helms Athletic Foundation, National Championship Foundation, Poling System, Sagarin Ratings Elo chess method, and Sagarin Ratings Predictor method; co-champion (alongside Princeton) per Parke H. Davis (Spalding's Official Foot Ball Guide)); Ohio State (Note: per Dunkel System) (not claimed); Princeton (Note: co-champions (alongside Michigan) per Parke H. Davis (Spalding's Official Foot Ball Guide)); USC (Note: per Williamson System) (not claimed)

The 1933 college football season saw the Michigan Wolverines repeat as winners of the Knute Rockne Memorial Trophy as national champion under the Dickinson System.

The unofficial east–west championship game, the Rose Bowl, was between Stanford (8–1–1) who was ranked behind USC and unranked Columbia (7–1). The Columbia Lions won the Rose Bowl game 7–0.

== Conference and program changes ==
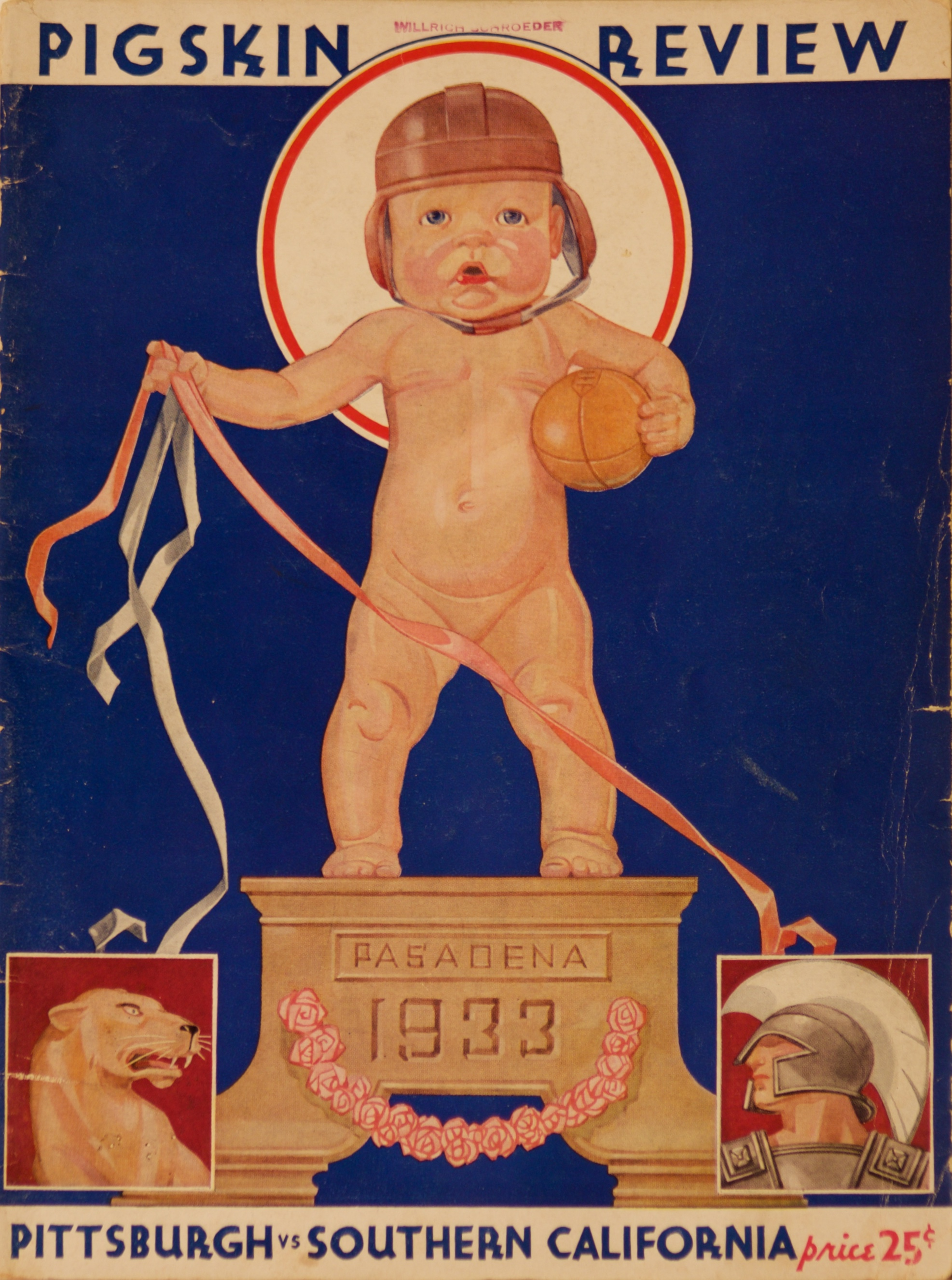
Official 1933 Rose Bowl program

Outside of College football: Due to the success of the 1932 NFL Playoff Game, the NFL stopped using the exact rules of college football and started to develop its own revisions.

=== Conference changes ===
Two new conferences began play in 1933:

  - Chesapeake Conference – active through the 1936 season
  - Southeastern Conference (SEC) – active NCAA Division I FBS conference; formed after its thirteen members broke away from the Southern Conference in 1932.

=== Membership changes ===
School	1932 Conference	1933 Conference
Auburn Tigers	SoCon	SEC
Alabama Crimson Tide	SoCon	SEC
Florida Gators	SoCon	SEC
Georgia Bulldogs	SoCon	SEC
Georgia Tech Yellow Jackets	SoCon	SEC
Kentucky Wildcats	SoCon	SEC
LSU Tigers	SoCon	SEC
Mississippi Rebels	SoCon	SEC
Mississippi State Bulldogs	SoCon	SEC
Northeastern Huskies	Program established	NEC
Sewanee Tigers	SoCon	SEC
Tennessee Volunteers	SoCon	SEC
Tulane Green Wave	SoCon	SEC
Vanderbilt Commodores	SoCon	SEC

== September ==
September 23 USC opened its season with a doubleheader against Occidental College, and Whittier College. Using a combination of varsity and reserves, the Trojans won 39–0 and 51–0, respectively. Although future President Richard M. Nixon had been on the freshman football team at Whittier, he was not part of the varsity squad that played against USC. Oregon defeated Linfield College 53–0. Stanford beat San Jose State 27–0

September 30 Stanford narrowly defeated UCLA 3–0, USC beat Loyola Marymount 18–0, and Oregon won at Gonzaga 14–0. Army opened with a 19–6 win over Mercer College. Minnesota beat visiting South Dakota State 19–6. Pittsburgh beat Washington & Jefferson 9–0.

== October ==
October 7 USC defeated Washington State 33–0, Stanford beat Santa Clara 7–0, and Oregon got past Portland College 14–7. Minnesota and Indiana tied 6–6. Michigan (whose team included Gerald Ford as a center) beat Michigan State 20–6, Purdue beat Ohio University 13–6, and Ohio State rolled over Virginia 75–0. Army beat Virginia Military Institute (VMI) 32–0 Pittsburgh beat West Virginia 21–0. Nebraska beat visiting Texas 26–0. Princeton opened its season with a shutout (40–0) over Amherst.

October 14 In Minneapolis, Minnesota and Purdue played to a 7–7 tie. In Chicago, Stanford and Northwestern played to a 0–0 tie. Oregon won at Washington 6–0, and USC beat St. Mary's 14–7. Army defeated Delaware 52–0 and Pittsburgh beat Navy 34–6. Ohio State defeated Vanderbilt 20–0. Michigan beat Cornell 40–0. Nebraska won at Iowa State 20–0. Princeton recorded its second shutout, a 45–0 win over Williams. Tennessee suffered its first defeat since 1930, losing 10–2 against Duke.

October 21 Michigan beat visiting Ohio State 13–0. Minnesota (1–0–2) hosted Pittsburgh (3–0–0), with the home team Gophers winning, 7–3. Purdue won at Chicago 14–0. In Portland, USC and Oregon State played to a 0–0 tie. Stanford won at the University of San Francisco, 20–13. In Cleveland Army beat Illinois 6–0. Nebraska won at Kansas State 9–0. Oregon beat Idaho 19–0 in a Friday Night game. Princeton beat Columbia, 20–0, to stay unscored upon.

October 28 USC narrowly won at California, 6–3, Oregon won at UCLA 7–0, and Stanford lost at Washington 6–0. Michigan won at Chicago 28–0, Ohio State beat Northwestern 12–0, Minnesota beat Iowa 19–7, and Purdue won at Wisconsin 14–0. Army won at Yale 21–0. Pittsburgh won at Notre Dame 14–0. Nebraska beat Oklahoma 16–7. Princeton narrowly won, but stayed unscored upon, with a 6–0 win over Washington & Lee.

== November ==
November 4 Oregon beat Utah 26–7. Stanford beat the Olympic Club 21–0 and Army beat Coe College 34–0. Purdue beat Carnegie Tech 17–7. Michigan won at Illinois, 7–6, Ohio State beat Indiana 21–0. Minnesota and Northwestern played to a 0–0 tie. Pittsburgh beat Centre College 37–0. Nebraska stayed unbeaten with a 26–0 win over Missouri. Princeton extended its shutout streak to five with a 33–0 win at Brown.

November 11 In Los Angeles, USC (6–0–1) hosted Stanford (5–1–1). The Trojans suffered their first defeat in 27 games, losing 13–7, in a game that ultimately decided the Pacific Coast championship. Michigan defeated Iowa 5–3. At Portland, Oregon beat Oregon State, 13–3 to extend its record to 8–0–0. Army won at Harvard 27–0. In Phildadelphia, Ohio State beat Penn 20–7 and Purdue won at Notre Dame 19–0. Pittsburgh beat Duquesne 7–0 and Nebraska defeated Kansas 12–0 Princeton beat Dartmouth, 7–0, for its sixth straight shutout.

November 18 USC (6–1–1) handed visiting Oregon (8–0–0) its first defeat, 26–0. Michigan (6–0–0) and Minnesota (3–0–3), both unbeaten, played to a scoreless tie. Pittsburgh (6–1–0) hosted Nebraska (5–0–0) and won 6–0. Princeton beat visiting Navy 13–0. In seven games, it had outscored its opponents 164–0. Stanford beat Montana 33–7. Army defeated Pennsylvania Military Institute, 12–0. Ohio State won at Wisconsin 6–0. Purdue suffered its first loss of the season, falling 14–6 to visiting Iowa.

November 25 Princeton was finally scored upon, after holding its first seven opponents scoreless. The streak was broken by Rutgers, which lost 26–6. USC won at Notre Dame, 19–0 and Stanford beat California 7–3. The annual Army–Navy Game took place in Philadelphia, and Army won 12–7. Ohio State closed its season with a 7–6 win over Illinois and Michigan won at Northwestern 13–0, Minnesota beat Wisconsin 6–3, and Purdue won at Indiana 19–3. Nebraska beat Iowa 7–6

Thanksgiving Day fell on November 30 in 1933. Nebraska defeated Oregon State 22–0 to close its season at 8–1–0. Oregon won at St. Mary's, 13–7. Pittsburgh beat Carnegie Tech 16–0.

== December ==
December 2 In Los Angeles, USC (8–1–1) hosted Georgia (8–1–0) and won 31–0 Army (9–0–0) and Notre Dame (2–5–1) met at Yankee Stadium. The Fighting Irish pulled off a 13–12 upset. Princeton, no longer having to maintain a streak of shutouts, won at Yale 27–2 to finish as the nation's only unbeaten and untied team.

== 1934 Rose Bowl ==
The Columbia Lions defeated the Stanford Indians (now Cardinal) 7–0. Cliff Montgomery, the Columbia quarterback, was named the Rose Bowl Player Of The Game when the award was created in 1953 and selections were made retroactively.

== Other bowls ==
- 1934 Dixie Classic

== Conference standings ==
=== Major conference standings ===
1933 Big Six Conference football standings
	Conf.					Overall
Team	W		L		T	W		L		T
No. 2 Nebraska $	5	–	0	–	0	8	–	1	–	0
Kansas State	4	–	1	–	0	6	–	2	–	1
Oklahoma	3	–	2	–	0	4	–	4	–	1
Kansas	2	–	3	–	0	5	–	4	–	1
Iowa State	1	–	4	–	0	3	–	5	–	1
Missouri	0	–	5	–	0	1	–	8	–	0
$ – Conference champion; Rankings from Dickinson System

1933 Big Ten Conference football standings
	Conf.					Overall
Team	W		L		T	W		L		T
No. 1 Michigan +	5	–	0	–	1	7	–	0	–	1
No. 3 Minnesota +	2	–	0	–	4	4	–	0	–	4
No. 5 Ohio State	4	–	1	–	0	7	–	1	–	0
No. 10 Purdue	3	–	1	–	1	6	–	1	–	1
Illinois	3	–	2	–	0	5	–	3	–	0
Iowa	3	–	2	–	0	5	–	3	–	0
Northwestern	1	–	4	–	1	1	–	5	–	2
Chicago	0	–	3	–	2	3	–	3	–	2
Indiana	0	–	3	–	2	1	–	5	–	2
Wisconsin	0	–	5	–	1	2	–	5	–	1
+ – Conference co-champions; Rankings from Dickinson System

1933 Border Conference football standings
	Conf.					Overall
Team	W		L		T	W		L		T
Texas Tech	1	–	0	–	0	8	–	1	–	0
Arizona State–Flagstaff	3	–	1	–	0	5	–	1	–	0
Arizona	3	–	2	–	0	5	–	3	–	0
New Mexico	2	–	2	–	0	3	–	4	–	1
Arizona State	2	–	2	–	0	3	–	5	–	0
New Mexico A&M	0	–	4	–	0	2	–	6	–	0
Arizona State and Arizona State–Flagstaff played twice, but only the first meeting counted in the conference standings.

1933 Pacific Coast Conference football standings
	Conf.					Overall
Team	W		L		T	W		L		T
No. 11 Stanford ^ +	4	–	1	–	0	8	–	2	–	1
No. 8 Oregon +	4	–	1	–	0	9	–	1	–	0
No. 6 USC	4	–	1	–	1	10	–	1	–	1
Oregon State	2	–	1	–	1	6	–	2	–	2
Washington State	3	–	3	–	1	5	–	3	–	1
California	2	–	2	–	2	6	–	3	–	2
Washington	3	–	4	–	0	5	–	4	–	0
UCLA	1	–	3	–	1	6	–	4	–	1
Idaho	1	–	4	–	0	4	–	4	–	0
Montana	0	–	4	–	0	3	–	4	–	0
+ – Conference co-champions; ^ – Selected as Rose Bowl representative; Rankings from Dickinson System

1933 Rocky Mountain Conference football standings
	Conf.					Overall
Team	W		L		T	W		L		T
Utah +	5	–	1	–	0	5	–	3	–	0
Colorado Agricultural +	5	–	1	–	1	5	–	1	–	1
Denver +	5	–	1	–	1	5	–	3	–	1
Colorado	5	–	2	–	0	7	–	2	–	0
BYU	5	–	3	–	0	5	–	4	–	0
Utah State	4	–	3	–	0	4	–	4	–	0
Colorado Teachers	3	–	3	–	0	4	–	3	–	0
Colorado College	2	–	4	–	1	2	–	5	–	1
Montana State	1	–	3	–	0	2	–	5	–	0
Colorado Mines	1	–	5	–	0	1	–	5	–	0
Wyoming	1	–	6	–	1	2	–	6	–	1
Western State (CO)	0	–	5	–	0	0	–	5	–	0
+ – Conference co-champions

1933 Southeastern Conference football standings
	Conf.					Overall
Team		W		L			W		L
Alabama $	5	–	0	–	1	7	–	1	–	1
LSU	3	–	0	–	2	7	–	0	–	3
Georgia	3	–	1	–	0	8	–	2	–	0
Tennessee	5	–	2	–	0	7	–	3	–	0
Tulane	4	–	2	–	1	6	–	3	–	1
Auburn	2	–	2	–	0	5	–	5	–	0
Ole Miss	2	–	2	–	1	6	–	3	–	2
Vanderbilt	2	–	2	–	2	4	–	3	–	3
Florida	2	–	3	–	0	5	–	3	–	1
Kentucky	2	–	3	–	0	5	–	5	–	0
Georgia Tech	2	–	5	–	0	5	–	5	–	0
Mississippi State	1	–	5	–	1	3	–	6	–	1
Sewanee	0	–	6	–	0	3	–	6	–	0
$ – Conference champion

1933 Southern Conference football standings
	Conf.					Overall
Team	W		L		T	W		L		T
Duke +	4	–	0	–	0	9	–	1	–	0
South Carolina +	3	–	0	–	0	6	–	3	–	1
North Carolina	2	–	1	–	0	4	–	5	–	0
VMI	2	–	1	–	1	2	–	7	–	1
Washington and Lee	1	–	1	–	1	4	–	4	–	2
Clemson	1	–	1	–	0	3	–	6	–	2
VPI	1	–	1	–	3	4	–	3	–	3
Virginia	1	–	3	–	1	2	–	6	–	2
Maryland	1	–	4	–	0	3	–	7	–	0
NC State	0	–	4	–	0	1	–	5	–	3
+ – Conference co-champions

1933 Southwest Conference football standings
	Conf.					Overall
Team	W		L		T	W		L		T
Arkansas	4	–	1	–	0	7	–	3	–	1
TCU	4	–	2	–	0	9	–	2	–	1
Baylor	4	–	2	–	0	6	–	4	–	0
Texas A&M	2	–	2	–	1	6	–	3	–	1
Texas	2	–	3	–	1	4	–	5	–	2
SMU	2	–	4	–	0	4	–	7	–	1
Rice	1	–	5	–	0	3	–	8	–	0
Because of an ineligible played used by Arkansas, no championship was awarded.

=== Independents ===
1933 Eastern college football independents records
	Conf.			Overall
Team	W	L	T	W		L		T
No. 7 Princeton		–		9	–	0	–	0
Duquesne		–		10	–	1	–	0
No. 9 Army		–		9	–	1	–	0
Boston College		–		8	–	1	–	0
Columbia		–		8	–	1	–	0
Pittsburgh		–		8	–	1	–	0
Colgate		–		6	–	1	–	1
Bucknell		–		7	–	2	–	0
Fordham		–		6	–	2	–	0
Tufts		–		6	–	2	–	0
Villanova		–		7	–	2	–	1
Harvard		–		5	–	2	–	1
Drexel		–		5	–	3	–	0
Massachusetts State		–		5	–	3	–	0
Temple		–		5	–	3	–	0
Manhattan		–		5	–	3	–	1
Cornell		–		4	–	3	–	0
Carnegie Tech		–		4	–	3	–	2
La Salle		–		3	–	3	–	2
Syracuse		–		4	–	4	–	0
Yale		–		4	–	4	–	0
Penn State		–		3	–	3	–	1
Brown		–		3	–	5	–	0
Vermont		–		3	–	5	–	0
Franklin & Marshall		–		4	–	5	–	0
NYU		–		2	–	4	–	1
Penn		–		2	–	4	–	1
Northeastern		–		1	–	3	–	1
Boston University		–		2	–	5	–	0
Washington & Jefferson		–		2	–	7	–	1
CCNY		–		1	–	5	–	1
Rankings from Dickinson System

1933 Midwestern college football independents records
	Conf.			Overall
Team	W	L	T	W		L		T
DePaul		–		6	–	0	–	1
Detroit		–		7	–	1	–	0
Michigan State Normal		–		5	–	2	–	0
Saint Louis		–		6	–	3	–	0
Central State (MI)		–		5	–	2	–	1
Michigan State		–		4	–	2	–	2
Missouri Mines		–		4	–	3	–	0
Michigan Tech		–		2	–	2	–	0
Western State Teachers		–		3	–	3	–	1
Marquette		–		3	–	4	–	1
Notre Dame		–		3	–	5	–	1
Haskell		–		2	–	6	–	3
Detroit City		–		2	–	5	–	1

1933 Southern college football independents records
	Conf.			Overall
Team	W	L	T	W		L		T
Oklahoma City		–		8	–	1	–	0
Tulsa		–		6	–	1	–	0
Troy State		–		5	–	1	–	0
Texas A&I		–		6	–	2	–	0
Catholic University		–		6	–	3	–	0
South Georgia Teachers		–		5	–	3	–	0
Western Maryland		–		5	–	3	–	0
William & Mary Norfolk		–		5	–	3	–	1
George Washington		–		5	–	3	–	1
Navy		–		5	–	4	–	0
Oglethorpe		–		4	–	5	–	0
Texas Mines		–		3	–	5	–	1
West Virginia		–		3	–	5	–	2
Delaware		–		2	–	4	–	2
Dixie (TX)		–		2	–	4	–	0
Georgetown		–		1	–	6	–	1
Jacksonville State		–		1	–	4	–	1
East Carolina		–		1	–	5	–	0
Wake Forest		–		0	–	5	–	1

1933 Western college football independents records
	Conf.			Overall
Team	W	L	T	W		L		T
Cal Poly		–		7	–	0	–	0
Loyola (CA)		–		7	–	2	–	1
Santa Clara		–		6	–	2	–	1
Saint Mary's		–		6	–	3	–	1
Hawaii		–		4	–	3	–	0
Columbia (OR)		–		4	–	3	–	1
Humboldt State		–		1	–	1	–	0
Gonzaga		–		2	–	6	–	1
San Francisco State		–		2	–	6	–	0
San Francisco		–		1	–	6	–	1

=== Minor conferences ===
Conference	Champion(s)	Record
Central Intercollegiate Athletics Association	Morgan College	9–0
Central Intercollegiate Athletic Conference	Wichita	6–0
Far Western Conference	Nevada	3–0
Iowa Intercollegiate Athletic Conference	Simpson	6–0–1
Kansas Collegiate Athletic Conference	Ottawa	4–0
Lone Star Conference	East Texas State Teachers	5–0
Michigan Intercollegiate Athletic Association	Hillsdale	4–0
Michigan-Ontario Collegiate Conference	Adrian; Lawrence Technological University	— —
Midwest Collegiate Athletic Conference	Coe	4–0
Minnesota Intercollegiate Athletic Conference	Gustavus Adolphus	4–0–1
Missouri Intercollegiate Athletic Association	Northeast Missouri State Teachers	4–0
Nebraska College Athletic Conference	Hastings	3–0–1
Nebraska Intercollegiate Athletic Association	State Normal–Chadron	4–0
North Central Intercollegiate Athletic Conference	South Dakota State College	4–0
North Dakota College Athletic Conference	Jamestown College	5–0–1
Northern Teachers Athletic Conference	St. Cloud State Teachers	4–0
Ohio Athletic Conference	Dayton	2–0–1
Oklahoma Collegiate Athletic Conference	Southwestern State Teachers (OK)	4–0
Pacific Northwest Conference	College of Puget Sound	5–0
South Dakota Intercollegiate Conference	Augustana (SD); Northern Normal and Industrial	4–0; 4–0–1
Southern California Intercollegiate Athletic Conference	Redlands	6–0–1
Southern Intercollegiate Athletic Conference	Tuskegee	—
Southwestern Athletic Conference	Wiley (TX)	5–0
Texas Conference	St. Edward's (TX)	5–1
Tri-Normal League	State Normal–Ellensburg	2–0
Wisconsin State Teachers College Conference	Stevens Point State Teachers	3–0–1

=== Minor conference standings ===
1933 Buckeye Athletic Association football standings
	Conf.					Overall
Team	W		L		T	W		L		T
Cincinnati +	4	–	1	–	0	7	–	2	–	0
Miami (OH) +	4	–	1	–	0	7	–	2	–	0
Ohio	3	–	1	–	1	6	–	2	–	1
Ohio Wesleyan	2	–	3	–	0	6	–	4	–	0
Marshall	1	–	3	–	1	3	–	5	–	1
Wittenberg	0	–	5	–	0	2	–	6	–	0
+ – Conference co-champions

1933 Central Intercollegiate Conference football standings
	Conf.					Overall
Team	W		L		T	W		L		T
Wichita $	6	–	0	–	0	8	–	2	–	0
Fort Hays State	3	–	1	–	2	6	–	2	–	2
Pittsburg State	2	–	2	–	2	4	–	3	–	2
Washburn	2	–	3	–	1	4	–	6	–	1
Emporia Teachers	2	–	4	–	0	3	–	5	–	1
College of Emporia	1	–	3	–	2	4	–	3	–	2
Southwestern (KS)	1	–	4	–	1	1	–	6	–	2
$ – Conference champion

1933 Colored Intercollegiate Athletic Association football standings
	Conf.					Overall
Team	W		L		T	W		L		T
Morgan $	8	–	0	–	0	9	–	0	–	0
Hampton	7	–	1	–	1	7	–	1	–	1
Bluefield State	4	–	1	–	2	5	–	2	–	2
Virginia Union	4	–	2	–	3	4	–	2	–	4
Saint Paul's (VA)	4	–	2	–	2	4	–	2	–	4
North Carolina A&T	3	–	3	–	3	3	–	3	–	3
North Carolina College	4	–	4	–	0	4	–	4	–	0
Howard	3	–	3	–	0	3	–	3	–	0
Johnson C. Smith	1	–	5	–	0	1	–	5	–	0
Virginia State	1	–	8	–	0	1	–	8	–	0
Lincoln (PA)	0	–	4	–	1	1	–	4	–	2
Shaw	0	–	6	–	0	1	–	6	–	0
$ – Conference champion

1933 Dixie Conference football standings
	Conf.					Overall
Team	W		L		T	W		L		T
Howard (AL) $	4	–	0	–	1	7	–	1	–	2
Centre	2	–	0	–	0	7	–	3	–	0
Mercer	2	–	0	–	1	4	–	3	–	2
Birmingham–Southern	2	–	1	–	3	3	–	3	–	3
Mississippi College	1	–	1	–	1	3	–	4	–	1
Millsaps	1	–	1	–	1	4	–	4	–	2
Southwestern (TN)	1	–	3	–	1	3	–	4	–	2
Chattanooga	0	–	2	–	2	2	–	3	–	2
Spring Hill	0	–	5	–	0	0	–	7	–	1
$ – Conference champion

1933 Eastern Pennsylvania Collegiate Conference football standings
	Conf.					Overall
Team	W		L		T	W		L		T
Gettysburg +	3	–	1	–	0	5	–	2	–	1
Muhlenberg +	3	–	1	–	0	6	–	3	–	0
Franklin & Marshall	2	–	2	–	0	4	–	5	–	0
Ursinus	1	–	2	–	1	4	–	3	–	2
Dickinson	0	–	3	–	1	2	–	4	–	2
+ – Conference co-champions

1933 Far Western Conference football standings
	Conf.					Overall
Team	W		L		T	W		L		T
Nevada $	3	–	0	–	0	4	–	4	–	0
San Jose State	3	–	1	–	0	4	–	4	–	0
Pacific (CA)	3	–	2	–	0	5	–	5	–	0
Fresno State	1	–	2	–	0	5	–	4	–	0
Chico State	1	–	3	–	0	2	–	6	–	0
Cal Aggies	1	–	4	–	0	2	–	5	–	0
$ – Conference champion

1933 Illinois Intercollegiate Athletic Conference football standings
	Conf.					Overall
Team	W		L		T	W		L		T
Illinois Wesleyan $	4	–	0	–	1	6	–	2	–	1
North Central	2	–	0	–	2	4	–	0	–	2
St. Viator	2	–	0	–	0	3	–	4	–	0
Millikin	1	–	0	–	2	3	–	1	–	2
McKendree	4	–	1	–	0	6	–	3	–	0
Augustana (IL)	4	–	1	–	1	7	–	1	–	1
Illinois College	4	–	1	–	1	4	–	2	–	1
Carthage	3	–	1	–	1	4	–	1	–	2
Illinois State Normal	5	–	2	–	0	6	–	3	–	0
Southern Illinois	4	–	2	–	0	4	–	4	–	1
Lake Forest	2	–	1	–	0	3	–	3	–	1
Bradley	3	–	2	–	1	3	–	5	–	2
Northern Illinois State	4	–	3	–	0	5	–	4	–	0
Monmouth (IL)	2	–	3	–	0	4	–	5	–	0
Western Illinois	2	–	4	–	0	3	–	5	–	0
Wheaton (IL)	1	–	2	–	2	2	–	2	–	3
Eastern Illinois	1	–	5	–	0	1	–	8	–	0
Elmhurst	0	–	3	–	1	0	–	5	–	1
Shurtleff	0	–	5	–	0	0	–	7	–	1
Knox (IL)	0	–	5	–	0	0	–	8	–	0
Eureka	0	–	7	–	0	0	–	7	–	0
$ – Conference champion

1933 Indiana Intercollegiate Conference football standings
	Conf.					Overall
Team	W		L		T	W		L		T
DePauw $	7	–	0	–	0	7	–	0	–	0
Valparaiso	3	–	0	–	0	7	–	1	–	0
Indiana State	6	–	1	–	0	7	–	1	–	0
Hanover	5	–	1	–	0	6	–	2	–	0
Wabash	4	–	2	–	1	4	–	2	–	1
Central Normal	3	–	2	–	0	4	–	2	–	1
Oakland City	3	–	2	–	0	3	–	3	–	0
Butler	2	–	3	–	0	2	–	6	–	0
Gary	1	–	2	–	0	2	–	3	–	0
Evansville	2	–	4	–	1	2	–	5	–	1
Franklin (IN)	2	–	4	–	1	2	–	5	–	1
Earlham	1	–	3	–	0	3	–	3	–	0
Manchester	1	–	3	–	0	1	–	5	–	1
Ball State	1	–	6	–	1	1	–	6	–	1
Rose Poly	0	–	8	–	0	0	–	8	–	0
$ – Conference champion

1933 Iowa Conference football standings
	Conf.					Overall
Team	W		L		T	W		L		T
Simpson (IA) $	6	–	0	–	1	7	–	2	–	1
Iowa Wesleyan	6	–	0	–	0	7	–	2	–	0
Morningside	2	–	0	–	0	4	–	4	–	0
St. Ambrose	4	–	2	–	0	4	–	4	–	0
Parsons	3	–	2	–	1	3	–	2	–	2
Iowa State Teachers	2	–	2	–	0	3	–	6	–	0
Upper Iowa	3	–	2	–	0	4	–	2	–	0
Penn (IA)	2	–	3	–	0	2	–	6	–	0
Luther	3	–	2	–	0	4	–	3	–	0
Dubuque	0	–	3	–	0	1	–	6	–	0
Western Union	0	–	3	–	0	0	–	8	–	0
Buena Vista	1	–	4	–	0	2	–	6	–	1
Central (IA)	1	–	5	–	1	2	–	6	–	1
Columbia (IA)	0	–	5	–	1	1	–	5	–	1
$ – Conference champion; Conference standings were based on Stanley-Dean ranking.

1933 Lone Star Conference football standings
	Conf.					Overall
Team	W		L		T	W		L		T
East Texas State $	5	–	0	–	0	5	–	2	–	1
Southwest Texas State	3	–	1	–	1	7	–	1	–	1
North Texas State	2	–	2	–	1	3	–	4	–	2
Sam Houston State	1	–	2	–	2	3	–	4	–	2
Trinity (TX)	1	–	3	–	1	2	–	5	–	2
Stephen F. Austin	0	–	4	–	1	0	–	6	–	1
$ – Conference champion

1933 Kansas Collegiate Athletic Conference football standings
	Conf.					Overall
Team	W		L		T	W		L		T
Ottawa $	4	–	0	–	0	5	–	3	–	0
McPherson	3	–	1	–	0	7	–	2	–	0
Kansas Wesleyan	2	–	2	–	0	5	–	4	–	0
Baker	1	–	3	–	0	2	–	7	–	0
Bethany (KS)	0	–	4	–	0	1	–	7	–	0
$ – Conference champion

1933 Michigan Intercollegiate Athletic Association football standings
	Conf.					Overall
Team	W		L		T	W		L		T
Hillsdale $	4	–	0	–	0	6	–	0	–	2
Hope	1	–	1	–	2	3	–	2	–	2
Kalamazoo	1	–	1	–	2	3	–	2	–	2
Albion	0	–	2	–	2	1	–	3	–	2
Alma	0	–	2	–	2	0	–	4	–	2
$ – Conference champion

1933 Middle Three Conference football standings
	Conf.					Overall
Team	W		L		T	W		L		T
Rutgers $	2	–	0	–	0	6	–	3	–	1
Lafayette	1	–	1	–	0	3	–	5	–	1
Lehigh	0	–	2	–	0	2	–	6	–	0
$ – Conference champion

1933 Midwest Conference football standings
	Conf.					Overall
Team	W		L		T	W		L		T
Coe $	4	–	0	–	0	6	–	1	–	2
Beloit	3	–	1	–	0	3	–	2	–	2
Cornell (IA)	3	–	1	–	1	3	–	4	–	2
Ripon	1	–	1	–	0	3	–	2	–	1
Monmouth (IL)	1	–	2	–	0	4	–	5	–	0
Lawrence	1	–	2	–	0	3	–	4	–	0
Carleton	0	–	2	–	1	2	–	2	–	2
Knox	0	–	4	–	0	0	–	8	–	0
$ – Conference champion

1933 Minnesota Intercollegiate Athletic Conference football standings
	Conf.					Overall
Team	W		L		T	W		L		T
Gustavus Adolphus $	4	–	0	–	1	5	–	0	–	2
St. Thomas (MN)	4	–	1	–	0	5	–	2	–	2
St. Olaf	3	–	1	–	0	4	–	3	–	0
Saint Mary's (MN)	2	–	2	–	1	3	–	3	–	1
Concordia (MN)	2	–	2	–	1	2	–	3	–	3
Hamline	2	–	2	–	1	2	–	3	–	1
Saint John's (MN)	1	–	2	–	2	3	–	3	–	2
Macalester	1	–	4	–	0	1	–	5	–	0
Augsburg	0	–	5	–	0	0	–	5	–	0
$ – Conference champion

1933 Mississippi Valley Conference football standings
	Conf.					Overall
Team	W		L		T	W		L		T
West Tennessee State Teachers	3	–	0	–	0	7	–	1	–	1
Sunflower Junior	2	–	1	–	0	2	–	1	–	0
Bethel (TN) $	3	–	2	–	0	5	–	4	–	0
Tennessee Poly	1	–	1	–	0	4	–	4	–	0
Lambuth	2	–	3	–	1	2	–	5	–	1
Delta State	1	–	2	–	0	2	–	7	–	0
Freed–Hardeman	0	–	3	–	1	0	–	3	–	1
$ – Conference champion

1933 Missouri College Athletic Union football standings
	Conf.					Overall
Team	W		L		T	W		L		T
Missouri Valley $	2	–	0	–	1	4	–	2	–	1
Tarkio	2	–	1	–	0	6	–	2	–	0
Culver–Stockton	1	–	1	–	0	5	–	1	–	0
Central (MO)	1	–	2	–	1	1	–	5	–	1
William Jewell	0	–	2	–	2	1	–	4	–	3
$ – Conference champion

1933 Missouri Intercollegiate Athletic Association football standings
	Conf.					Overall
Team	W		L		T	W		L		T
Kirksville $	4	–	0	–	0	9	–	0	–	0
Warrensburg	3	–	1	–	0	6	–	3	–	0
Cape Girardeau	2	–	2	–	0	5	–	3	–	1
Maryville (MO)	1	–	3	–	0	1	–	8	–	0
Springfield (MO)	0	–	4	–	0	2	–	5	–	0
$ – Conference champion

1933 Missouri Valley Conference football standings
	Conf.					Overall
Team	W		L		T	W		L		T
Oklahoma A&M $	2	–	0	–	0	6	–	2	–	1
Drake	5	–	1	–	0	6	–	3	–	1
Creighton	2	–	2	–	0	3	–	4	–	1
Washington University	1	–	2	–	0	4	–	5	–	0
Butler	0	–	2	–	0	2	–	6	–	0
Grinnell	0	–	3	–	0	0	–	8	–	1
$ – Conference champion

1933 Nebraska College Athletic Conference football standings
	Conf.					Overall
Team	W		L		T	W		L		T
Hastings $	3	–	0	–	1	4	–	2	–	1
Nebraska Wesleyan	3	–	1	–	0	3	–	5	–	1
Midland	2	–	2	–	0	3	–	4	–	0
York (NE)	0	–	2	–	2	4	–	4	–	2
Doane	0	–	3	–	1	1	–	5	–	2
$ – Conference champion

1933 Nebraska Intercollegiate Athletic Association football standings
	Conf.					Overall
Team	W		L		T	W		L		T
Chadron State $	4	–	0	–	0	6	–	1	–	0
Omaha	2	–	1	–	1	5	–	3	–	1
Wayne State (NE)	1	–	1	–	2	6	–	1	–	2
Peru State	1	–	2	–	1	5	–	2	–	1
Kearney State	0	–	4	–	0	0	–	6	–	2
$ – Conference champion

1933 New England Conference football standings
	Conf.					Overall
Team	W		L		T	W		L		T
Rhode Island State $	2	–	0	–	0	6	–	2	–	0
New Hampshire	1	–	0	–	0	3	–	3	–	1
Connecticut State	0	–	1	–	0	1	–	6	–	1
Maine	0	–	2	–	0	4	–	3	–	0
$ – Conference champion

1933 North Central Conference football standings
	Conf.					Overall
Team	W		L		T	W		L		T
South Dakota State $	4	–	0	–	0	6	–	3	–	0
North Dakota Agricultural	2	–	1	–	1	3	–	2	–	4
North Dakota	1	–	2	–	1	3	–	5	–	1
Morningside	1	–	3	–	0	4	–	4	–	0
South Dakota	1	–	3	–	0	5	–	6	–	0
$ – Conference champion

1933 North Dakota Intercollegiate Athletic Conference football standings
	Conf.					Overall
Team	W		L		T	W		L		T
Jamestown $	5	–	0	–	1	5	–	1	–	1
Dickinson State	3	–	1	–	0	5	–	1	–	0
Minot State	2	–	1	–	2	4	–	1	–	2
Mayville State	2	–	2	–	0	2	–	2	–	0
Wahpeton	2	–	2	–	1	3	–	3	–	1
Valley City State	1	–	5	–	0	1	–	5	–	0
Ellendale	0	–	4	–	0	0	–	4	–	0
$ – Conference champion

1933 North State Conference football standings
	Conf.					Overall
Team	W		L		T	W		L		T
Elon $	2	–	0	–	1	5	–	3	–	1
Appalachian State	1	–	0	–	0	7	–	2	–	0
Lenoir Rhyne	2	–	1	–	1	3	–	3	–	3
Catawba	1	–	1	–	1	2	–	5	–	2
Guilford	1	–	1	–	1	2	–	7	–	1
Western Carolina	0	–	4	–	0	1	–	7	–	1
$ – Conference champion

1933 Northern Teachers College Conference football standings
	Conf.					Overall
Team	W		L		T	W		L		T
St. Cloud State $	3	–	0	–	0	7	–	0	–	0
Winona State	3	–	1	–	0	5	–	3	–	0
Duluth State	3	–	1	–	1	3	–	3	–	1
Bemidji State	2	–	3	–	0	3	–	3	–	1
Moorhead State	0	–	2	–	1	2	–	4	–	2
Mankato State	0	–	4	–	0	0	–	6	–	1
$ – Conference champion

1933 Northwest Conference football standings
	Conf.					Overall
Team	W		L		T	W		L		T
Puget Sound $	5	–	0	–	0	6	–	2	–	0
Willamette	4	–	1	–	0	6	–	3	–	0
Pacific (OR)	3	–	3	–	0	4	–	4	–	0
Linfield	2	–	2	–	0	4	–	4	–	0
Whitman	1	–	3	–	1	3	–	5	–	1
College of Idaho	0	–	2	–	1	2	–	3	–	2
Albany (OR)	0	–	4	–	0	0	–	7	–	0
$ – Conference champion

1933 Ohio Athletic Conference football standings
	Conf.					Overall
Team	W		L		T	W		L		T
Dayton $	3	–	0	–	1	8	–	2	–	1
Wooster	7	–	1	–	1	7	–	1	–	1
Akron	5	–	2	–	1	5	–	3	–	1
Case	5	–	2	–	0	5	–	3	–	1
Muskingum	4	–	2	–	1	5	–	2	–	1
Baldwin–Wallace	4	–	2	–	1	5	–	3	–	1
Toledo	3	–	2	–	1	5	–	2	–	1
John Carroll	3	–	2	–	2	5	–	2	–	2
Hiram	2	–	2	–	2	2	–	2	–	3
Kent State	2	–	2	–	3	2	–	2	–	3
Otterbein	3	–	4	–	1	3	–	4	–	1
Mount Union	3	–	4	–	1	3	–	5	–	1
Marietta	2	–	3	–	1	3	–	3	–	1
Heidelberg	2	–	3	–	2	2	–	5	–	2
Denison	2	–	3	–	1	2	–	6	–	1
Oberlin	2	–	3	–	0	4	–	4	–	0
Ashland	2	–	4	–	1	3	–	4	–	1
Bowling Green	1	–	3	–	2	2	–	3	–	2
Capital	1	–	4	–	2	1	–	4	–	2
Ohio Northern	0	–	4	–	1	0	–	5	–	2
Kenyon	0	–	5	–	1	1	–	5	–	1
Xavier *	1	–	0	–	0	5	–	4	–	0
$ – Conference champion; * – did not compete for championship

1933 Oklahoma Collegiate Conference football standings
	Conf.					Overall
Team	W		L		T	W		L		T
SW Oklahoma State $	4	–	0	–	0	7	–	2	–	1
SE Oklahoma State	2	–	1	–	0	5	–	2	–	0
Northeastern State	3	–	2	–	0	3	–	3	–	1
Central State Teachers	2	–	2	–	1	4	–	5	–	1
East Central	0	–	3	–	2	2	–	5	–	2
NW Oklahoma State	0	–	3	–	1	3	–	4	–	1
$ – Conference champion

1933 Smoky Mountain Conference football standings
	Conf.					Overall
Team	W		L		T	W		L		T
Carson–Newman $	6	–	0	–	0	7	–	1	–	0
East Tennessee State Teachers	3	–	1	–	1	6	–	1	–	2
Maryville (TN)	3	–	2	–	0	4	–	5	–	1
Tusculum	1	–	2	–	2	2	–	3	–	2
King	1	–	4	–	0	4	–	6	–	0
Milligan	0	–	4	–	1	2	–	6	–	1
Cumberland (TN)	0	–	1	–	0	7	–	3	–	0
$ – Conference champion

1933 South Dakota Intercollegiate Conference football standings
	Conf.					Overall
Team	W		L		T	W		L		T
Augustana (SD) +	4	–	0	–	0	5	–	2	–	0
Northern Normal +	4	–	0	–	1	4	–	2	–	2
Huron	4	–	1	–	2	4	–	1	–	2
South Dakota Mines	3	–	1	–	0	4	–	3	–	0
Yankton	3	–	2	–	1	3	–	3	–	2
Eastern Normal	2	–	2	–	0	3	–	2	–	1
Southern Normal	2	–	4	–	0	3	–	5	–	0
Sioux Falls	1	–	4	–	0	3	–	4	–	0
Dakota Wesleyan	1	–	6	–	0	1	–	6	–	0
Spearfish	0	–	4	–	0	1	–	7	–	0
+ – Conference co-champions; South Dakota Mines and Spearfish played twice. The second game was not counted in the conference standings.

1933 Southern California Conference football standings
	Conf.					Overall
Team	W		L		T	W		L		T
Redlands $	6	–	0	–	1	6	–	1	–	1
Whittier	4	–	1	–	2	4	–	4	–	2
La Verne	5	–	2	–	0	3	–	4	–	0
San Diego State	4	–	2	–	1	4	–	4	–	1
Pomona	2	–	5	–	0	2	–	5	–	0
Occidental	2	–	5	–	0	2	–	6	–	0
Caltech	2	–	5	–	0	2	–	7	–	0
Santa Barbara State	1	–	6	–	0	1	–	8	–	0
$ – Conference champion; Conference records include forfeits which are not reflected in overall records.

1933 Southern Intercollegiate Athletic Association football standings
	Conf.					Overall
Team	W		L		T	W		L		T
Murray State $	7	–	0	–	0	9	–	0	–	0
Howard (AL)	5	–	0	–	0	7	–	1	–	2
Centenary	3	–	0	–	0	8	–	0	–	4
Furman	4	–	0	–	1	6	–	1	–	2
Union (KY)	3	–	0	–	1	4	–	1	–	1
Miami (FL)	2	–	0	–	1	5	–	1	–	2
Western Kentucky State Teachers	5	–	1	–	0	6	–	2	–	0
Centre	3	–	1	–	0	7	–	3	–	0
Loyola (LA)	3	–	1	–	0	6	–	4	–	1
Rollins	2	–	1	–	0	6	–	2	–	0
SW Louisiana	3	–	2	–	0	6	–	3	–	0
Presbyterian	3	–	2	–	0	4	–	2	–	2
Millsaps	3	–	2	–	1	4	–	4	–	2
Newberry	2	–	2	–	1	6	–	3	–	1
Tennessee Tech	2	–	2	–	0	4	–	4	–	0
The Citadel	2	–	2	–	1	3	–	5	–	1
Louisiana Normal	2	–	3	–	0	6	–	3	–	0
Mississippi College	2	–	3	–	0	3	–	4	–	1
Georgetown (KY)	2	–	3	–	1	2	–	5	–	1
Mississippi State Teachers	2	–	4	–	1	3	–	5	–	2
Southwestern (TN)	1	–	2	–	0	3	–	4	–	2
Louisiana Tech	1	–	3	–	0	1	–	7	–	0
Louisiana College	1	–	4	–	0	3	–	4	–	0
Wofford	1	–	4	–	0	3	–	6	–	0
Transylvania	1	–	4	–	0	1	–	7	–	1
Erskine	1	–	5	–	0	2	–	7	–	0
Union (TN)	1	–	5	–	0	3	–	7	–	0
Louisville	1	–	6	–	0	1	–	7	–	0
Mercer	0	–	0	–	1	4	–	3	–	2
Stetson	0	–	0	–	1	3	–	3	–	1
Eastern Kentucky State Teachers	0	–	2	–	2	1	–	2	–	3
Middle Tennessee State Teachers	0	–	4	–	0	1	–	7	–	1
$ – Conference champion

1933 Southwestern Athletic Conference football standings
	Conf.			Overall
Team	W	L	T	W	L	T
Langston +		–			–
Prairie View +		–			–
+ – Conference co-champions

1933 Texas Conference football standings
	Conf.					Overall
Team	W		L		T	W		L		T
St. Edward's $	5	–	1	–	0	7	–	2	–	0
Howard Payne	4	–	2	–	0	5	–	3	–	1
Abilene Christian *	2	–	1	–	2	5	–	3	–	2
McMurry	3	–	2	–	0	4	–	4	–	2
Austin	1	–	2	–	2	1	–	6	–	2
Simmons (TX)	1	–	2	–	1	4	–	5	–	1
Southwestern (TX)	1	–	4	–	1	1	–	8	–	2
Daniel Baker	0	–	4	–	2	0	–	7	–	2
$ – Conference champion; * – Abilene Christian's game against Texas A&I counted in conference standings even though Texas A&I was not a conference member.

1933 Tri-State Conference football standings
	Conf.					Overall
Team	W		L		T	W		L		T
Geneva $	4	–	0	–	0	7	–	3	–	0
Grove City	4	–	1	–	0	6	–	1	–	1
Thiel	2	–	3	–	0	3	–	4	–	0
Westminster (PA)	1	–	2	–	0	2	–	6	–	0
Waynesburg	1	–	3	–	0	2	–	7	–	0
Bethany (WV)	0	–	3	–	0	0	–	5	–	1
$ – Conference champion

1933 Virginia Conference football standings
	Conf.					Overall
Team	W		L		T	W		L		T
Emory and Henry +	2	–	1	–	0	10	–	1	–	0
Richmond +	2	–	1	–	0	5	–	4	–	0
William & Mary +	2	–	1	–	0	6	–	5	–	0
Roanoke	0	–	3	–	0	4	–	5	–	0
+ – Conference co-champions

1933 West Virginia Athletic Conference football standings
	Conf.					Overall
Team	W		L		T	W		L		T
Davis & Elkins $	5	–	0	–	0	9	–	1	–	1
Salem	7	–	1	–	0	7	–	1	–	0
Fairmont State	3	–	1	–	0	6	–	1	–	0
West Virginia Wesleyan	2	–	2	–	0	4	–	7	–	0
West Liberty State	1	–	3	–	1	2	–	4	–	2
Glenville State	1	–	3	–	1	2	–	4	–	1
Morris Harvey	0	–	5	–	0	1	–	8	–	0
Concord *	2	–	1	–	0	4	–	3	–	0
New River State *	1	–	1	–	0	4	–	2	–	0
Shepherd *	1	–	2	–	0	5	–	2	–	0
Marshall *	0	–	1	–	0	3	–	5	–	1
Potomac State *	0	–	3	–	0	2	–	4	–	0
$ – Conference champion; * – Did not qualify for conference standings Ties did not count in conference standings.

1933 Wisconsin State Teachers College Conference football standings
	Conf.					Overall
Team	W		L		T	W		L		T
Stevens Point State $	4	–	0	–	1	7	–	0	–	1
Milwaukee State	3	–	1	–	0	5	–	3	–	0
Superior State	2	–	1	–	0	5	–	1	–	2
River Falls State	2	–	1	–	1	4	–	1	–	1
Oshkosh State	2	–	1	–	1	4	–	1	–	2
Stout Institute	2	–	2	–	0	3	–	3	–	0
La Crosse State	2	–	2	–	1	3	–	4	–	1
Whitewater State	1	–	3	–	0	3	–	4	–	0
Eau Claire State	0	–	3	–	0	5	–	2	–	1
Platteville State	0	–	4	–	0	1	–	4	–	0
$ – Conference champion

== Rankings ==
Most major rankings (both contemporary and retroactive) have identified Michigan as the season's champion. The three exceptions were the contemporary ranking Dunkel System (which found Ohio State the champion), the contemporary Williamson System ranking (which found USC to be the champion), and ranking by Parke H. Davis for Spalding's Official Foot Ball Guide (which found Princeton to have been co-champion alongside Michigan).

== Awards and honors ==
=== All-Americans ===
The consensus All-America team included:

Position	Name	Height	Weight (lbs.)	Class	Hometown	Team
QB	Cotton Warburton	5'7"	145	Jr.	San Diego, California	USC
HB	Beattie Feathers	5'10"	180	Sr.	Bristol, Virginia	Tennessee
HB	George Sauer	6'2"	195	Sr.	Stratton, Nebraska	Nebraska
FB	Duane Purvis			Jr.	Mattoon, Illinois	Purdue
E	Joe Skladany	5'10"	190	Sr.	Larksville, Pennsylvania	Pittsburgh
T	Whitey Wistert	6'2"	210	Sr.	Chicago, Illinois	Pittsburgh
G	Bill Corbus	5'11"	178	Sr.	San Francisco, California	Stanford
C	Chuck Bernard	6'3"	225	Sr.	Benton Harbor, Michigan	Michigan
G	Aaron Rosenberg	6'0"	210	Sr.	Brooklyn, New York	USC
T	Fred Crawford	6'2"	195	Sr.	Waynesville, North Carolina	Duke
E	Paul Geisler			Sr.	Berwick, Louisiana	Centenary

=== Statistical leaders ===
- Player scoring most points: Beattie Feathers, Tennessee, 78
