= 1933 in Michigan =

- Decades: 1910s; 1920s; 1930s; 1940s; 1950s
- See also: History of Michigan; Historical outline of Michigan; List of years in Michigan; 1933 in the United States

Events from the year 1933 in Michigan.

== Office holders ==
=== State office holders ===
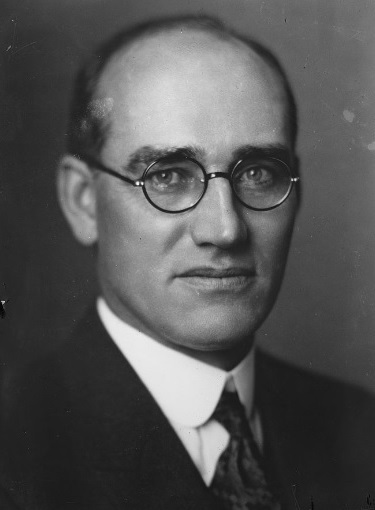
William Comstock

- Governor of Michigan: William Comstock (Democrat)
- Lieutenant Governor of Michigan: Allen E. Stebbins (Democrat)
- Michigan Attorney General: Patrick H. O'Brien
- Michigan Secretary of State: Frank D. Fitzgerald (Republican)
- Speaker of the Michigan House of Representatives: Martin R. Bradley (Democrat)
- Chief Justice, Michigan Supreme Court: John S. McDonald

=== Mayors of major cities ===
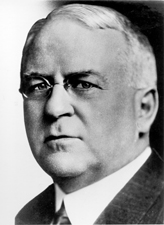
James Couzens

- Mayor of Detroit: Frank Murphy (Democrat)/Frank Couzens (Republican)
- Mayor of Grand Rapids: John D. Karel
- Mayor of Flint: William H. McKeighan/Ray A. Brownell
- Mayor of Saginaw: Ben N. Mercer
- Mayor of Lansing: Max A. Templeton
- Mayor of Ann Arbor: H. Wirt Newkirk/Robert A. Campbell

=== Federal office holders ===
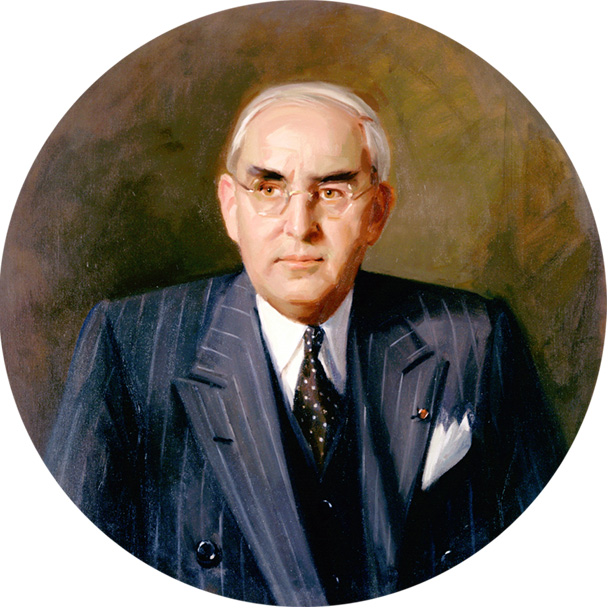
Arthur Vandenberg

- U.S. Senator from Michigan: James J. Couzens (Republican)
- U.S. Senator from Michigan: Arthur Vandenberg (Republican)
- House District 1: Robert H. Clancy (Democrat)/George G. Sadowski (Democrat)
- House District 2: Earl C. Michener (Republican)/John C. Lehr (Democrat)
- House District 3: Joseph L. Hooper (Republican)
- House District 4: John C. Ketcham (Republican)/George Ernest Foulkes (Democrat)
- House District 5: Carl E. Mapes (Republican)
- House District 6: Seymour H. Person (Republican)/Claude E. Cady (Democrat)
- House District 7: Jesse P. Wolcott (Republican)
- House District 8: Michael J. Hart (Democrat)
- House District 9: James C. McLaughlin (Republican)/Harry W. Musselwhite (Democrat)
- House District 10: Roy O. Woodruff (Republican)
- House District 11: Frank P. Bohn (Republican)/Prentiss M. Brown (Democrat)
- House District 12: W. Frank James (Republican)
- House District 13: Clarence J. McLeod (Republican)

== Population ==
In the 1930 United States census, Michigan was recorded as having a population of 4,842,325, ranking as the seventh most populous state in the country. By 1940, Michigan's population had increased by 8.5% to 5,256,106.

=== Cities ===
The following is a list of cities in Michigan with a population of at least 20,000 based on 1930 U.S. Census data. Historic census data from 1920 and 1940 is included to reflect trends in population increases or decreases. Cities that are part of the Detroit metropolitan area are shaded in tan.

1930 Rank	City	County	1920 Pop.	1930 Pop.	1940 Pop.	Change 1930-40
1	Detroit	Wayne	993,678	1,568,662	1,623,452	3.5%
2	Grand Rapids	Kent	137,634	168,592	164,292	−2.6%
3	Flint	Genesee	91,599	156,492	151,543	−3.2%
4	Saginaw	Saginaw	61,903	80,715	82,794	2.6%
5	Lansing	Ingham	57,327	78,397	78,753	0.5%
6	Pontiac	Oakland	34,273	64,928	66,626	2.6%
7	Hamtramck	Wayne	48,615	56,268	49,839	−11.4%
8	Jackson	Jackson	48,374	55,187	49,656	−10.0%
9	Kalamazoo	Kalamazoo	48,487	54,786	54,097	−1.3%
10	Highland Park	Wayne	46,499	52,959	50,810	−4.1%
11	Dearborn	Wayne	2,470	50,358	63,589	26.3%
12	Bay City	Bay	47,554	47,355	47,956	1.3%
13	Battle Creek	Calhoun	36,164	45,573	43,453	−4.7%
14	Muskegon	Muskegon	36,570	41,390	47,697	15.2%
15	Port Huron	St. Clair	25,944	31,361	32,759	4.5%
16	Wyandotte	Wayne	13,851	28,368	30,618	7.9%
17	Ann Arbor	Washtenaw	19,516	26,944	29,815	10.7%
18	Royal Oak	Oakland	6,007	22,904	25,087	9.5%
19	Ferndale	Oakland	2,640	20,855	22,523	8.0%

=== Counties ===
The following is a list of counties in Michigan with populations of at least 50,000 based on 1930 U.S. Census data. Historic census data from 1920 and 1940 are included to reflect trends in population increases or decreases.

1930 Rank	County	Largest city	1920 Pop.	1930 Pop.	1940 Pop.	Change 1930-40
1	Wayne	Detroit	1,177,645	1,888,946	2,015,623	6.7%
2	Kent	Grand Rapids	183,041	240,511	246,338	2.4%
3	Genesee	Flint	125,668	211,641	227,944	7.7%
4	Oakland	Pontiac	90,050	211,251	254,068	20.3%
5	Saginaw	Saginaw	100,286	120,717	130,468	8.1%
6	Ingham	Lansing	81,554	116,587	130,616	12.0%
7	Jackson	Jackson	72,539	92,304	93,108	0.9%
8	Kalamazoo	Kalamazoo	71,225	91,368	100,085	9.5%
9	Calhoun	Battle Creek	72,918	87,043	94,206	8.2%
10	Muskegon	Muskegon	62,362	84,630	94,501	11.7%
11	Berrien	Benton Harbor	62,653	81,066	89,117	9.9%
12	Macomb	Warren	38,103	77,146	107,638	39.5%
13	Bay	Bay City	69,548	69,474	74,981	7.9%
14	St. Clair	Port Huron	58,009	67,563	76,222	12.8%
15	Washtenaw	Ann Arbor	49,520	65,530	80,810	23.3%
16	Ottawa	Holland	47,660	54,858	59,660	8.8%
17	Houghton	Houghton	71,930	52,851	47,631	−9.9%
18	Monroe	Monroe	37,115	52,485	58,620	11.7%
19	Lenawee	Adrian	47,767	49,849	53,110	6.5%

== Sports ==
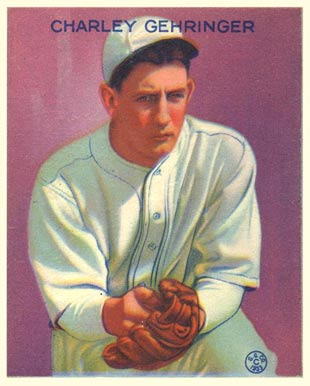
Charlie Gehringer

=== Baseball ===
- 1933 Detroit Tigers season – Under manager Bucky Harris, the Tigers compiled a 75–79 record and finished in fifth place in the American League. The team's statistical leaders included Charlie Gehringer with a .325 batting average and 108 RBIs, Gehringer and Hank Greenberg with 12 home runs each, and 139 RBIs, Firpo Marberry with 16 wins, and Tommy Bridges with a 3.09 earned run average.
- 1933 Michigan Wolverines baseball season - Under head coach Ray Fisher, the Wolverines compiled a 12–4 record. Michael Diffley was the team captain.

=== American football ===
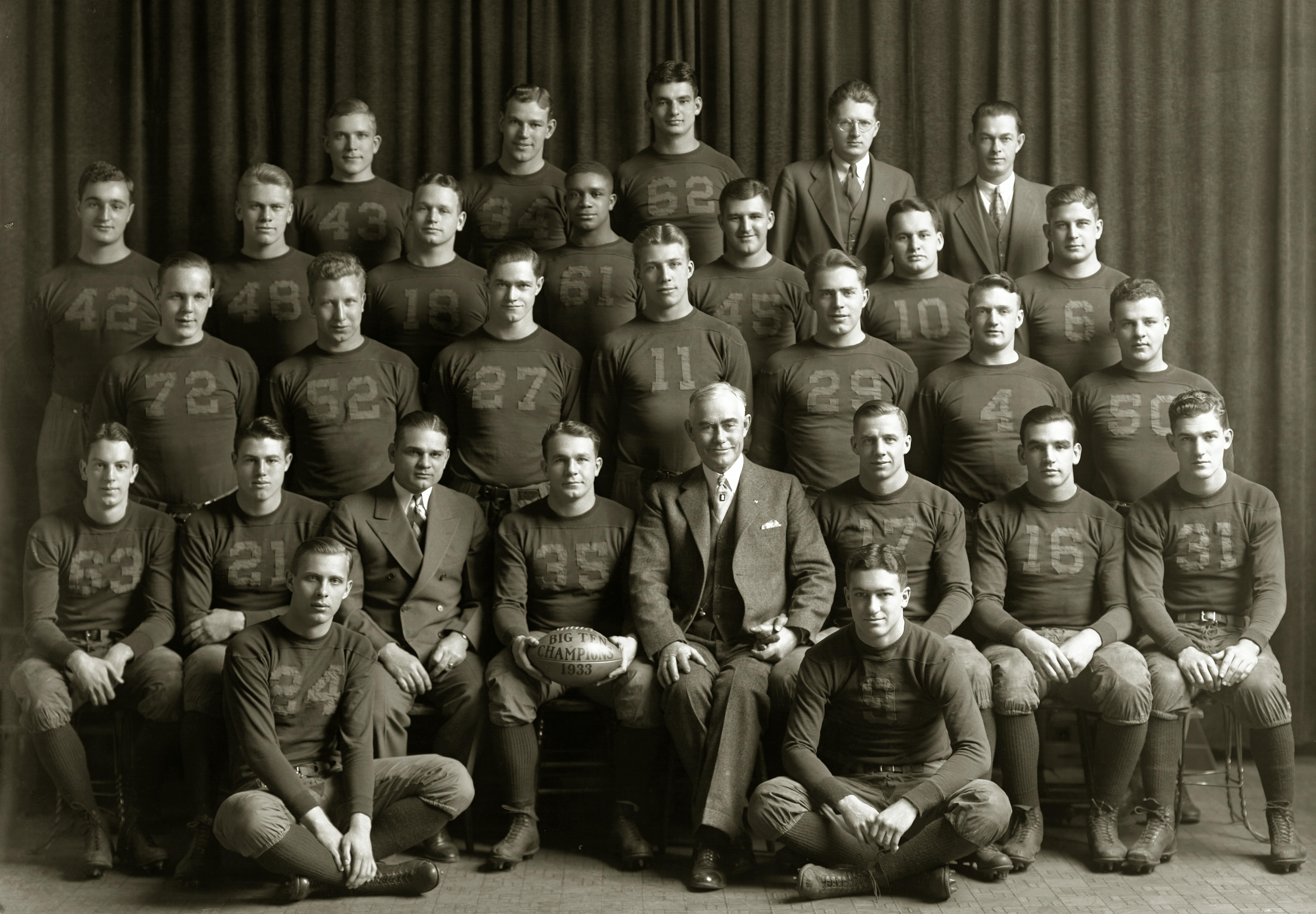
1933 Michigan football team

- 1933 Michigan Wolverines football team – Under head coach Harry Kipke, the Wolverines compiled a 7–0–1 record, tied for the Big Ten Conference championship, and were selected as national champions by 10 selectors.
- 1933 Michigan State Spartans football team – Under head coach Charlie Bachman, the Spartans compiled a 4–2–2 record.
- 1933 Detroit Titans football team – The Titans compiled a 7–1 record under head coach Gus Dorais.
- 1933 Central State Bearcats football team - Under head coach George Van Bibber the Bercats compiled a 5–2–1 record.
- 1933 Western State Hilltoppers football team - Under head coach Mike Gary, the Hilltoppers compiled a 3–3–1 record.
- 1933 Michigan State Normal Hurons football team - Under head coach Elton Rynearson, the Hurons compiled a 6–2 record.
- 1933 Detroit City College Tartars football team – The Tartars compiled a 2–5–1 record under head coach Joe Gembis.

=== Basketball ===
- 1932–33 Western Michigan Broncos men's basketball team – Under head coach Buck Read, the Broncos compiled a 14–3 record.
- 1932–33 Detroit Titans men's basketball team – Under head coach Lloyd Brazil, the Titans compiled a 12–5 record.
- 1932–33 Michigan State Spartans men's basketball team – Under head coach Benjamin Van Alstyne, the Spartans compiled a 10–7 record.
- 1932–33 Michigan Wolverines men's basketball team – Under head coach Franklin Cappon, the Wolverines compiled a 10–8 record.
- 1932–33 City College of Detroit (CCD) men's basketball team – Under coach Newman Ertell, CCD (later known as Wayne State) compiled a 7–10 record.

=== Ice hockey ===
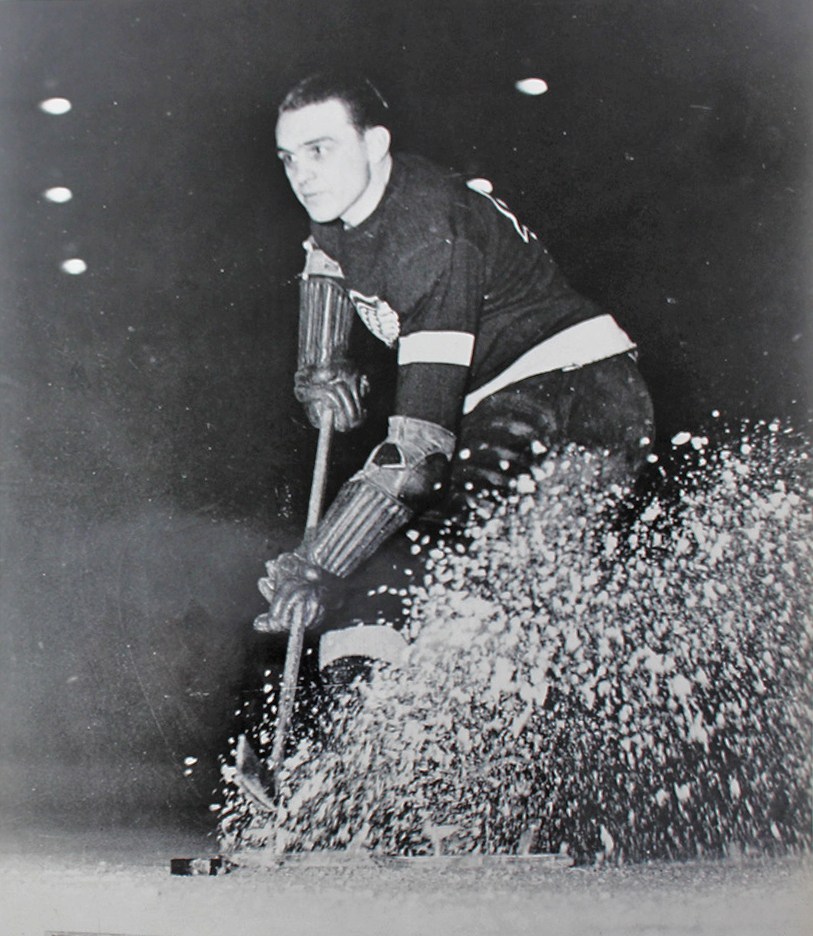
Herbie Lewis

- 1932–33 Detroit Red Wings season – Under coach Jack Adams, the Red Wings compiled a 25–15–8 record, finished in second place in the National Hockey League (NHL) American Division, and lost in the playoff semi-finals to the New York Rangers. The team's statistical leaders included Herbie Lewis with 20 goals and 34 points and Lewis and Carl Voss with 14 assists each. John Ross Roach was the team's goaltender.
- 1932–33 Michigan Wolverines men's ice hockey team – Under head coach Ed Lowrey, the Wolverines compiled a 10–4–2 record.
- 1932–33 Michigan Tech Huskies men's ice hockey team – Under head coach Bert Noblet, the Huskies compiled a 9–5–1 record.

=== Other ===
- Port Huron to Mackinac Boat Race –
- Michigan Open -

== Chronology of events ==
=== January ===
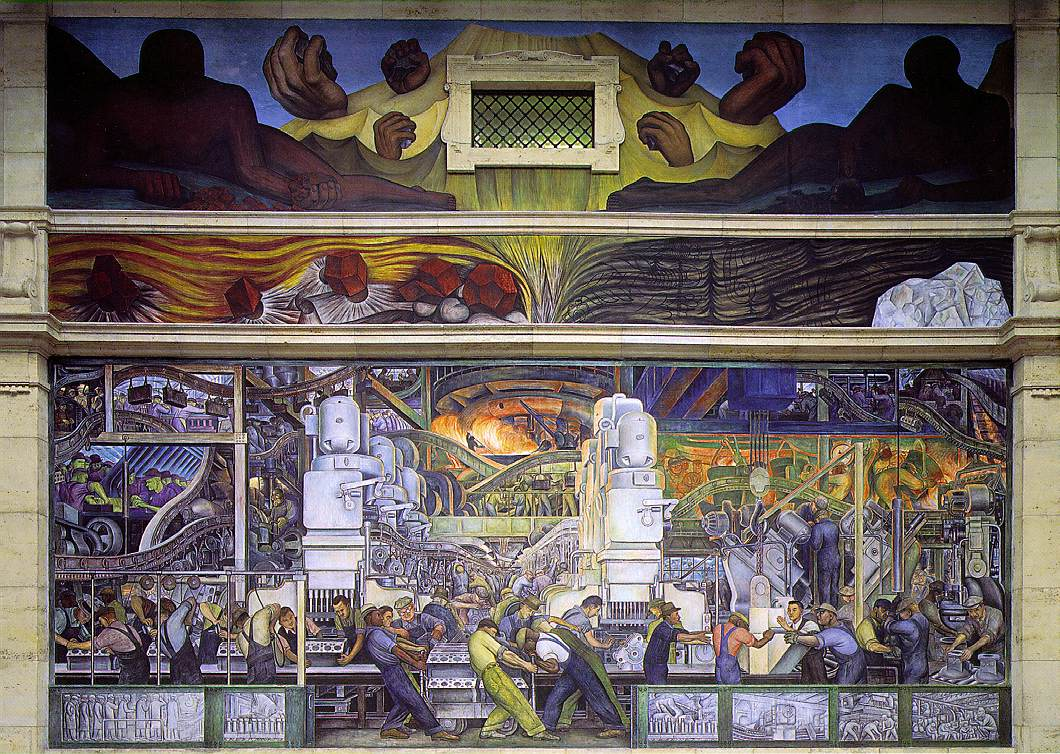
Detroit Industry Murals

- Jan. 3, 1933 - Diego Rivera completes the north wall of his Detroit Industry Murals at the Detroit Institute of Arts.
- January 30 - The Lone Ranger made its debut on Detroit's WXYZ radio station.

=== February ===
- February 13 - Auto workers go on strike.
- February 14 - Gov. William Comstock orders the closure of all banks in Michigan to prevent a run on the banks.

=== March ===
- March 13 - Diego Rivera completes the Detroit Industry Murals.

=== April ===
- April 10 - Michigan became the first state to ratify the repeal of Prohibition. The members of Michigan's constitutional convention voted 99 to 1 in favor of repeal.

=== December ===
- December 24 - The Italian Hall disaster resulted in 73 deaths in a stampede after someone falsely shouted "fire" at a crowded Christmas party.

== Births ==
- January 4 - Darris McCord, defensive end/tackle for Detroit Lions (1955–1967), in Detroit
- January 7 - Marian Ilitch, co-founder of Little Caesars Pizza with her husband, Mike Ilitch, in Dearborn, Michigan
- January 30 - Bert Zagers, halfback for the Washington Redskins (1955–1958), in Fremont, Michigan
- January 31 - Walter Beach, AFL/NFL defensive back (1960–1966), in Pontiac, Michigan
- February 17 - Colleen Howe, sports agent and wife of Gordie Howe, in Sandusky, Michigan
- April 10 - Robert Nederlander, attorney and former president of the Nederlander Organization, in Detroit
- April 12 - Charley Lau, Major League Baseball catcher (1956–1967), in Romulus, Michigan
- April 27 - John Morrow, NFL offensive lineman (1956–1966), in Port Huron, Michigan
- May 16 - Bob Bruce, Major League Baseball pitcher (1959–1967), in Detroit
- June 10 - Chuck Fairbanks, head football coach for Oklahoma (1967-1971), New England Patriots (1973–1978), and Colorado (1979–1981), in Detroit
- August 25 - Tom Skerritt, actor (MASH, Alien, Top Gun, A River Runs Through It, Picket Fences), in Detroit
- September 1 - Gene Harris, jazz pianist in soul jazz style, in Benton Harbor, Michigan
- September 19 - Norm Masters, CFL/NFL offensive lineman (1956–1964), in Detroit
- October 30 - Warith Deen Mohammed, leader of the Nation of Islam (1975-1976) and American Society of Muslims (1976-2003), in Detroit
- November 24 - Art Walker, CFL lineman (1955–1961), in South Haven, Michigan
- December 30 - Jim Letherer, civil rights activist, in Saginaw, Michigan
- December 31 - Ken Rowe, Major League Baseball pitcher (1963–1965), in Ferndale, Michigan

=== Gallery of 1933 births ===
Charley Lau

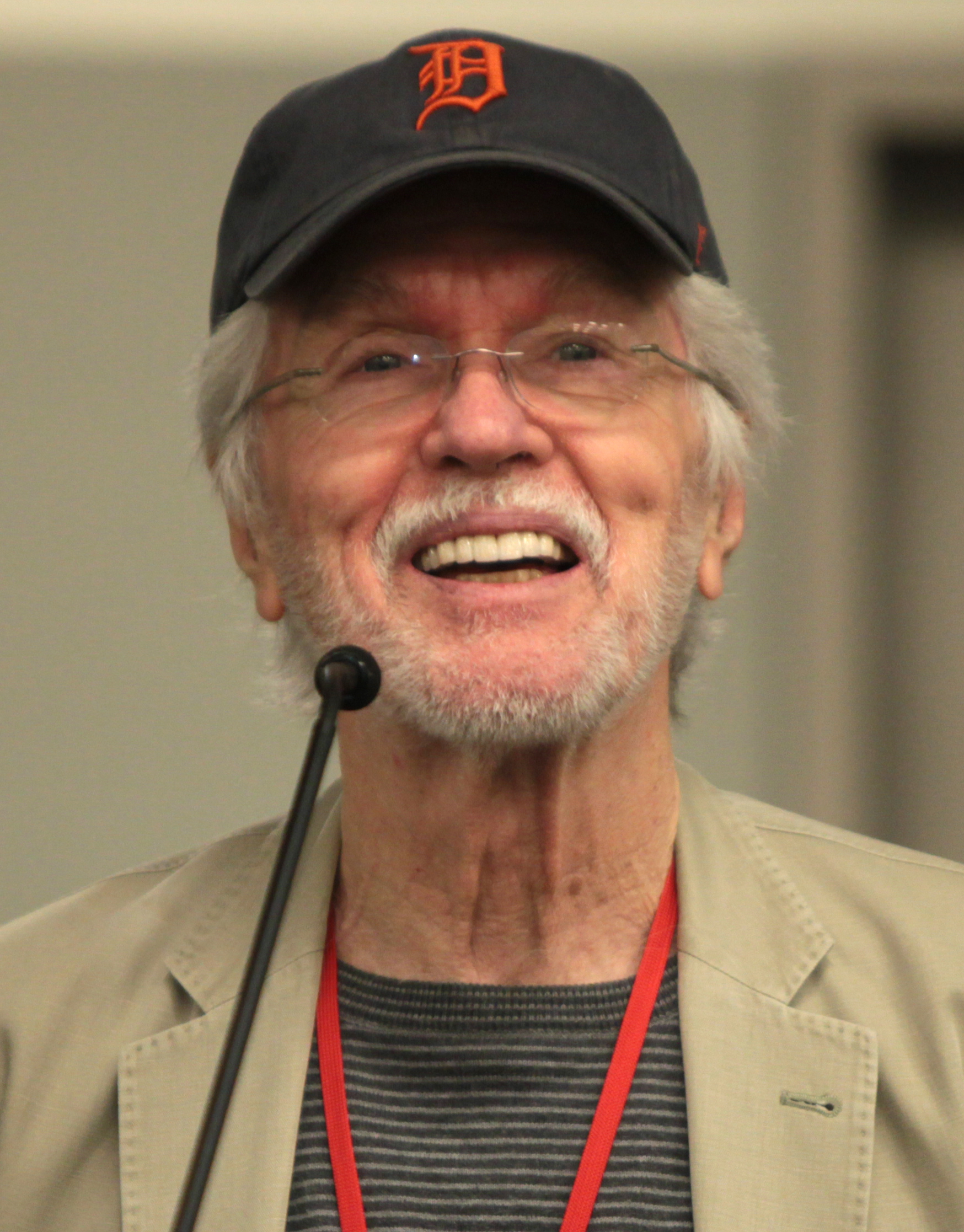
Tom Skerritt

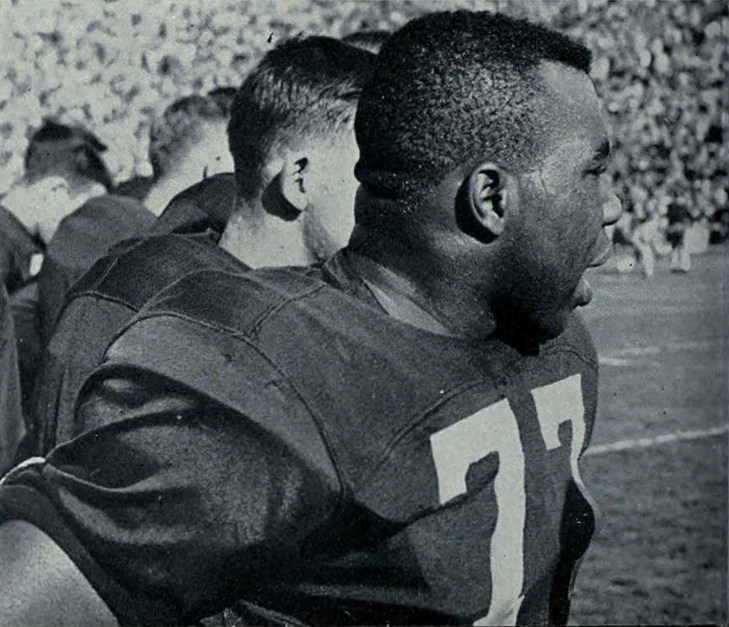
Art Walker

== Deaths ==
- June 12 - Horace Rackham, one of the original stockholders in the Ford Motor Company and a noted philanthropist, at age 74 in Detroit
- October 7 - Jo Labadie, labor organizer, anarchist, Greenbacker, social activist, publisher, and poet, at age 83 in Detroit

=== Gallery of 1933 deaths ===
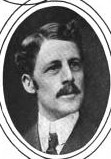
Horace Rackham

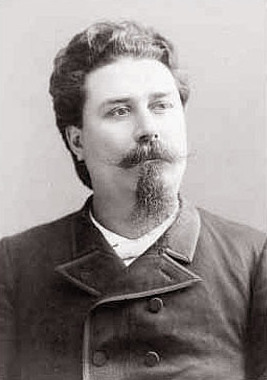
Jo Labadie

== See also ==
- History of Michigan
- History of Detroit
