= John and Katharine Tunkun Podjun Farm =

- U.S. National Register of Historic Places
- U.S. Historic district
- Location within Michigan Location within the United States
- Interactive map
- Location: 9582 E 1 Mile Rd., Luther, Michigan
- Coordinates: 44°0′11.1″N 85°36′37.7″W 44°00'11.1"N 85°36'37.7"W
- Area: 120 acres (49 ha)
- Built: 1914
- Architectural style: I-house
- NRHP reference No.: 02000160
- Added to NRHP: March 13, 2002

The John and Katharine Tunkun Podjun Farm is a farm located at 9582 East 1 Mile Road in Luther, Michigan. It was listed on the National Register of Historic Places in 2002.

== History ==
John Podjunus emigrated from Lithuania in 1897 or 1898, shortening his name (to Podjun) on arrival and settling in Boston. He eventually moved to the coal-mining region of southern Illinois, and built a house in Johnston City, Illinois. In 1904 he married Katharine Tunkun, the sister of a friend and fellow emigre. Some years later, the couple had had two children and considered moving. They saw an advertisement in a Lithuanian-language newspaper for land in Lake County, Michigan. Other Lithuanians had already settled in the area in the late 19th century, drawn by the timber industry and farming.

John and Katharine Podjun purchased the land this farm sits on in 1914, and moved there in the summer of that year. At the time, the land was recently cut timber. John Podjun immediately began clearing the land, developing crop fields, an orchard, pasture areas and a large garden plot. The Podjuns also constructed a small dwelling (now the rear portion of the main house) and then the main section of the barn, completing the barn in 1916. They slowly constructed a complex of farm buildings over the next 15 years, adding a granary, corn crib, machine shed, chicken house, and an addition to the barn.

John Podjun retired from farming in 1953 and died the following year. Katherine Podjun continued living there until her death in 1973, and the couple's daughter Amelia Podjun Baker Yost lived there until her death in 1995. After Amelia's death, the farm passed to her surviving children, Paul Ross Baker, Amelia C. Jayne, and Kathleen McNeel.

== Description ==
The Podjun Farm is an L-shaped tract of land covering 120 acres (49 ha). The farm also includes crop fields, an orchard, pasture, a woodlot, red pine plantations, areas of cedar swamp, and a farmstead with a collection of buildings. The buildings include an I-house-style farmhouse, a gambrel-roof barn, a granary/corn crib, and a machine shed. Springs on the property form the headwaters of the Little Manistee River.

House: The Podjun house is a two-story side-gable I-house with a one-story rear ell. The rear ell is the original living quarters, built in 1914. The house is covered with clapboard with plain corner- and frieze boards. A porch is located in the center of the front facade, supported with brick piers. The front section of the house measures 28 feet by 16 feet, and contains a living room and bedroom downstairs, with two bedrooms upstairs. The rear ell contains a kitchen and a utility room.

Barn: The barn consists of two sections connected to form an L shape, The original section of the barn, constructed in 1914-15, is a gambrel-roof structure with sliding entrance door on a fieldstone foundation, measuring 60 feet by 40 feet. A 1930 gable-roof addition on a concrete foundation, measuring 42 feet by 32 feet, projects to one side. Both sections are framed with beech timbers in a combination of post and beam and plank framing, and sided vertically. The basement level of the original portion contains thirty oak stanchions for cows and two double and two single stalls for horses, set on either side of a center aisle. The addition's basement level contains a calf barn with its pens and animal-feeding facilities. The upper portion contains space for hay storage, and an upper loft for bedding straw.

Machine Shed: The machine shed is a 16 foot by 30 foot asymmetrically gables structure built in the 1920s. It has a concrete foundation and vertical board siding with three sets of doors. The interior contains a workbench and the base for an electrical generator used until 1940 to supply electricity to the farm.

Granary / Corn Crib: The granary is a gable roofed building measuring 18 feet by 10 feet, with a granary on one end and corn crib in the other. The granary portion is clad in vertical boarding, the corn crib in wooden slats. The building rests on individual field stones at each corner.

The farmstead area also contains foundations for a round wooden silo and a small chicken coop, the remains of a well and pump, and a 1970s garage. The remains of a farm lane run from the barnyard to One Mile road, with a small concrete slab bridge built in 1931 crossing the Little Manistee River.
