= 1936 in Michigan =

- Decades: 1910s; 1920s; 1930s; 1940s; 1950s
- See also: History of Michigan; Historical outline of Michigan; List of years in Michigan; 1936 in the United States

Events from the year 1936 in Michigan.

== Office holders ==
=== State office holders ===
- Governor of Michigan: Frank Fitzgerald (Republican)
- Lieutenant Governor of Michigan: Thomas Reed (Republican)
- Michigan Attorney General: David H. Crowley
- Michigan Secretary of State: Orville E. Atwood (Republican)
- Speaker of the Michigan House of Representatives: George A. Schroeder
- Chief Justice, Michigan Supreme Court: Walter Harper North

=== Mayors of major cities ===
- Mayor of Detroit: Frank Couzens (Republican)
- Mayor of Grand Rapids: William Timmers/Tunis Johnson
- Mayor of Flint: George E. Boysen/Harold E. Bradshaw
- Mayor of Dearborn: John Carey
- Mayor of Saginaw: Ben N. Mercer/Frank Marxer
- Mayor of Lansing: Max A. Templeton
- Mayor of Ann Arbor: Robert A. Campbell

=== Federal office holders ===
- U.S. Senator from Michigan: James J. Couzens (Republican)/Prentiss M. Brown (Democrat)
- U.S. Senator from Michigan: Arthur Vandenberg (Republican)
- House District 1: George G. Sadowski (Democrat)
- House District 2: Earl C. Michener (Republican)
- House District 3: Verner Main (Republican)
- House District 4: Clare Hoffman (Republican)
- House District 5: Carl E. Mapes (Republican)
- House District 6: William W. Blackney (Republican)
- House District 7: Jesse P. Wolcott (Republican)
- House District 8: Fred L. Crawford (Republican)
- House District 9: Albert J. Engel (Republican)
- House District 10: Roy O. Woodruff (Republican)
- House District 11: Prentiss M. Brown (Democrat)
- House District 12: Frank Eugene Hook (Democrat)
- House District 13: Clarence J. McLeod (Republican)
- House District 14: Louis C. Rabaut (Democrat)
- House District 15: John D. Dingell Sr. (Democrat)
- House District 16: John Lesinski Sr. (Democrat)
- House District 17: George Anthony Dondero (Republican)

== Population ==
In the 1930 United States census, Michigan was recorded as having a population of 4,842,325, ranking as the seventh most populous state in the country. By 1940, Michigan's population had increased by 8.5% to 5,256,106.

=== Cities ===
The following is a list of cities in Michigan with a population of at least 20,000 based on 1930 U.S. Census data. Historic census data from 1920 and 1940 is included to reflect trends in population increases or decreases. Cities that are part of the Detroit metropolitan area are shaded in tan.

1930 Rank	City	County	1920 Pop.	1930 Pop.	1940 Pop.	Change 1930-40
1	Detroit	Wayne	993,678	1,568,662	1,623,452	3.5%
2	Grand Rapids	Kent	137,634	168,592	164,292	−2.6%
3	Flint	Genesee	91,599	156,492	151,543	−3.2%
4	Saginaw	Saginaw	61,903	80,715	82,794	2.6%
5	Lansing	Ingham	57,327	78,397	78,753	0.5%
6	Pontiac	Oakland	34,273	64,928	66,626	2.6%
7	Hamtramck	Wayne	48,615	56,268	49,839	−11.4%
8	Jackson	Jackson	48,374	55,187	49,656	−10.0%
9	Kalamazoo	Kalamazoo	48,487	54,786	54,097	−1.3%
10	Highland Park	Wayne	46,499	52,959	50,810	−4.1%
11	Dearborn	Wayne	2,470	50,358	63,589	26.3%
12	Bay City	Bay	47,554	47,355	47,956	1.3%
13	Battle Creek	Calhoun	36,164	45,573	43,453	−4.7%
14	Muskegon	Muskegon	36,570	41,390	47,697	15.2%
15	Port Huron	St. Clair	25,944	31,361	32,759	4.5%
16	Wyandotte	Wayne	13,851	28,368	30,618	7.9%
17	Ann Arbor	Washtenaw	19,516	26,944	29,815	10.7%
18	Royal Oak	Oakland	6,007	22,904	25,087	9.5%
19	Ferndale	Oakland	2,640	20,855	22,523	8.0%

=== Counties ===
The following is a list of counties in Michigan with populations of at least 50,000 based on 1930 U.S. Census data. Historic census data from 1920 and 1940 are included to reflect trends in population increases or decreases.

1930 Rank	County	Largest city	1920 Pop.	1930 Pop.	1940 Pop.	Change 1930-40
1	Wayne	Detroit	1,177,645	1,888,946	2,015,623	6.7%
2	Kent	Grand Rapids	183,041	240,511	246,338	2.4%
3	Genesee	Flint	125,668	211,641	227,944	7.7%
4	Oakland	Pontiac	90,050	211,251	254,068	20.3%
5	Saginaw	Saginaw	100,286	120,717	130,468	8.1%
6	Ingham	Lansing	81,554	116,587	130,616	12.0%
7	Jackson	Jackson	72,539	92,304	93,108	0.9%
8	Kalamazoo	Kalamazoo	71,225	91,368	100,085	9.5%
9	Calhoun	Battle Creek	72,918	87,043	94,206	8.2%
10	Muskegon	Muskegon	62,362	84,630	94,501	11.7%
11	Berrien	Benton Harbor	62,653	81,066	89,117	9.9%
12	Macomb	Warren	38,103	77,146	107,638	39.5%
13	Bay	Bay City	69,548	69,474	74,981	7.9%
14	St. Clair	Port Huron	58,009	67,563	76,222	12.8%
15	Washtenaw	Ann Arbor	49,520	65,530	80,810	23.3%
16	Ottawa	Holland	47,660	54,858	59,660	8.8%
17	Houghton	Houghton	71,930	52,851	47,631	−9.9%
18	Monroe	Monroe	37,115	52,485	58,620	11.7%
19	Lenawee	Adrian	47,767	49,849	53,110	6.5%

== Sports ==
=== Baseball ===
- 1936 Detroit Tigers season – Under player-manager Mickey Cochrane, the Tigers compiled an 83-71 record and finished in second place in the American League. The team's statistical leaders included second baseman Charlie Gehringer with a .354 batting average and 60 doubles, Goose Goslin with 24 home runs and 125 RBIs, and Tommy Bridges with 23 wins and a 3.60 earned run average.
- 1936 Michigan Wolverines baseball season - Under head coach Ray Fisher, the Wolverines compiled a 20–5 record and won the Big Ten Conference championship. Berger Larson was the team captain.

=== American football ===
- 1936 Detroit Lions season – Under head coach Potsy Clark, the Lions compiled an 8–4 record and placed third in the NFL's Western Division. The team's statistical leaders included Dutch Clark with 467 passing yards and 73 points scored, Ace Gutowsky with 827 rushing yards, and Harry Ebding with 194 receiving yards.
- 1936 Michigan Wolverines football team – The Wolverines compiled a 1–7 record under head coach Harry Kipke.
- 1936 Michigan State Spartans football team – The Spartans compiled a 6–1–2 record under head coach Charlie Bachman.
- 1936 Michigan State Normal Hurons football team – The Hurons compiled a record of 6–2 and outscored opponents by a total of 76 to 53.
- 1936 Detroit Titans football team – The Titans compiled a 7–3 record under head coach Gus Dorais.
- 1936 Wayne Tartars football team – The Tartars compiled a 5–2–1 record under head coach Joe Gembis.

=== Basketball ===
- 1935–36 Western Michigan Broncos men's basketball team – Under head coach Buck Read, the Broncos compiled a 15–3 record.
- 1935–36 Detroit Titans men's basketball team – Under head coach Lloyd Brazil, the Titans compiled a 12–5 record.
- 1935–36 Michigan Wolverines men's basketball team – Under head coach Franklin Cappon, the Wolverines compiled an 8–12 record. Johnny Gee and Chelso Tamagno were members of the team.
- 1935–36 Michigan State Spartans men's basketball team – Under head coach Benjamin Van Alstyne, the Spartans compiled an 8–9 record.
- 1935–36 Wayne Tartars men's basketball team – Under coach Newman Ertell, Wayne compiled a 13–4 record.

=== Ice hockey ===
- 1935–36 Detroit Red Wings season – Under coach Jack Adams, the Red Wings compiled a 24–16–8 record, finished in first place in the National Hockey League (NHL) American Division, and defeated the Toronto Maple Leafs in the 1936 Stanley Cup Finals. The team's statistical leaders included Marty Barry with 21 goals and 40 points and Herbie Lewis with 23 assists.
- 1935–36 Michigan Wolverines men's ice hockey team – Under head coach Ed Lowrey, the Wolverines compiled a 7–9 record.
- 1935–36 Michigan Tech Huskies men's ice hockey team – Under head coach Bert Noblet, the Huskies compiled a 6–9–1 record.

=== Other ===
- Port Huron to Mackinac Boat Race – On July 19, the Baccarat owned by Russell Alger won the race with a corrected time of 40 hours, 27 minutes, 45 seconds.
- Michigan Open - On July 21, Marvin Stahl from Green Ridge Country Club in Grand Rapids won the event with a 284 total (four under par) in Jackson, Michigan.
- APBA Gold Cup – On July 26, Kaye Don driving Horace Dodge's Impshi, representing the Detroit Yacht Club, won the Gold Cup on the waters of Lake George.

== Births ==
- January 14 - Linda Lawson, television and film actress and singer, in Ann Arbor, Michigan
- January 27 - Samuel C. C. Ting, Nobel Prize-winning physicist who discovered the subatomic J/ψ particle, in Ann Arbor, Michigan
- February 11 - Burt Reynolds, actor (Deliverance, The Longest Yard, Smokey and the Bandit, Boogie Nights), in Lansing, Michigan
- February 29 - Jack R. Lousma, NASA astronaut (Skylab, Space Shuttle STS-3 commander), in Grand Rapids, Michigan
- March 26 - Jim Ninowski, NFL quarterback (1958-1969), in Detroit
- March 29 - Judith Guest, novelist (Ordinary People) and screenwriter (Ordinary People), in Detroit
- April 10 - Bobby Smith, one of the lead singers of Motown's The Spinners, in Detroit
- April 12 - Tony Earl, Governor of Wisconsin (1983-1987), in Lansing, Michigan
- June 6 - Levi Stubbs, lead singer of Motown's Four Tops, in Detroit
- June 14 - Dave Whitsell, NFL cornerback (1958-1969), in Shelby, Michigan
- June 15 - Renaldo Benson, one of Motown's Four Tops and co-writer of "What's Going On", in Detroit
- June 26 - Nancy Willard, author (Anatole trilogy, A Visit to William Blake's Inn), in Ann Arbor, Michigan
- June 28 - Fred Gladding, Major League Baseball pitcher (1961-1973), NL saves leader in 1969, in Flat Rock, Michigan
- August 16 - Ken W. Clawson, White House Communications Director under Presidents Nixon and Ford, in Monroe, Michigan
- September 11 - Paul Riser, trombonist, Motown musical arranger, one of the "Funk Brothers", in Detroit
- December 15 - Donald Goines, novelist (including the Kenyatta series), in Detroit

=== Gallery of 1936 births ===
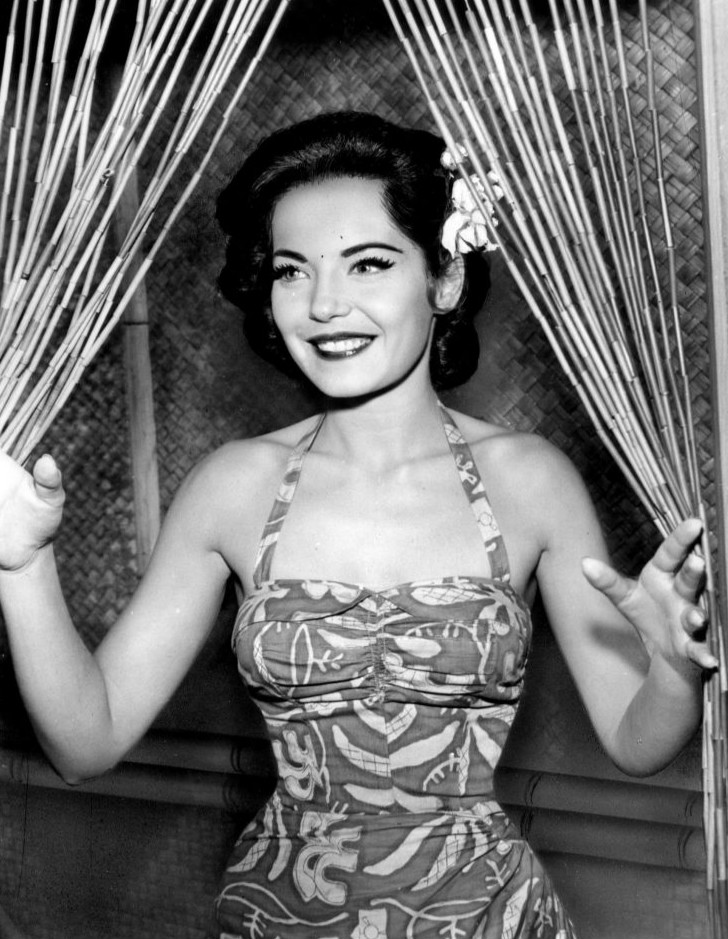
Linda Lawson

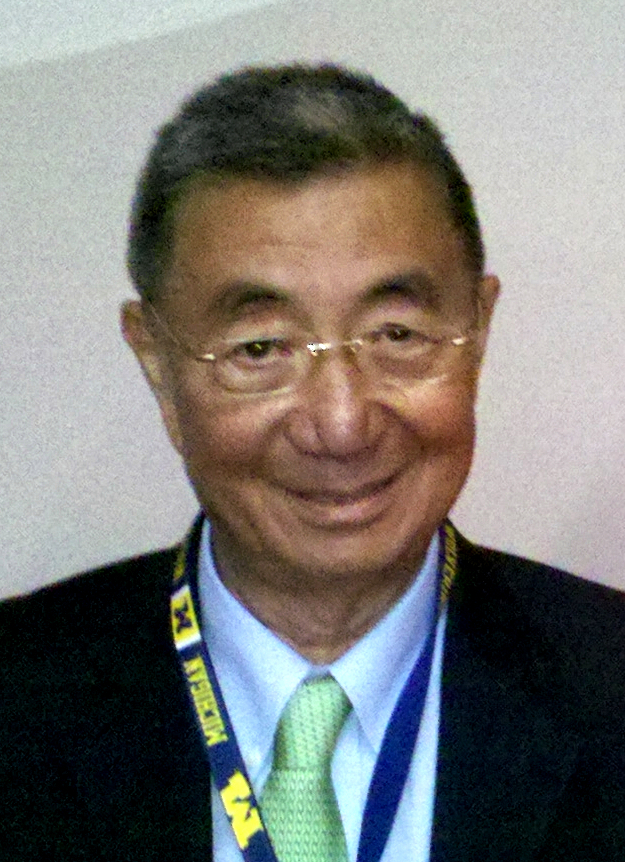
Samuel C. C. Ting

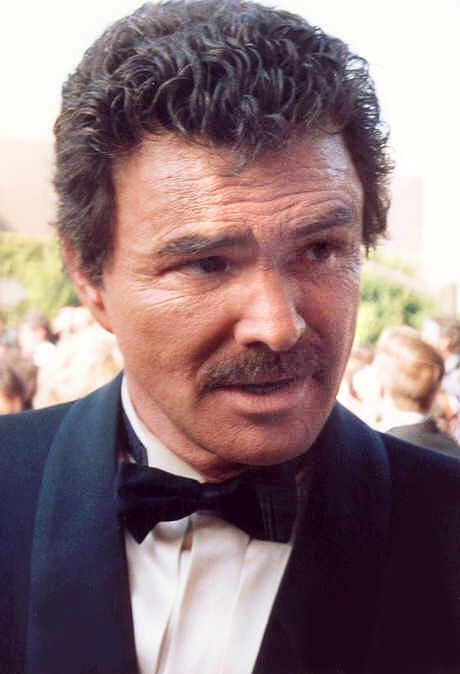
Burt Reynolds

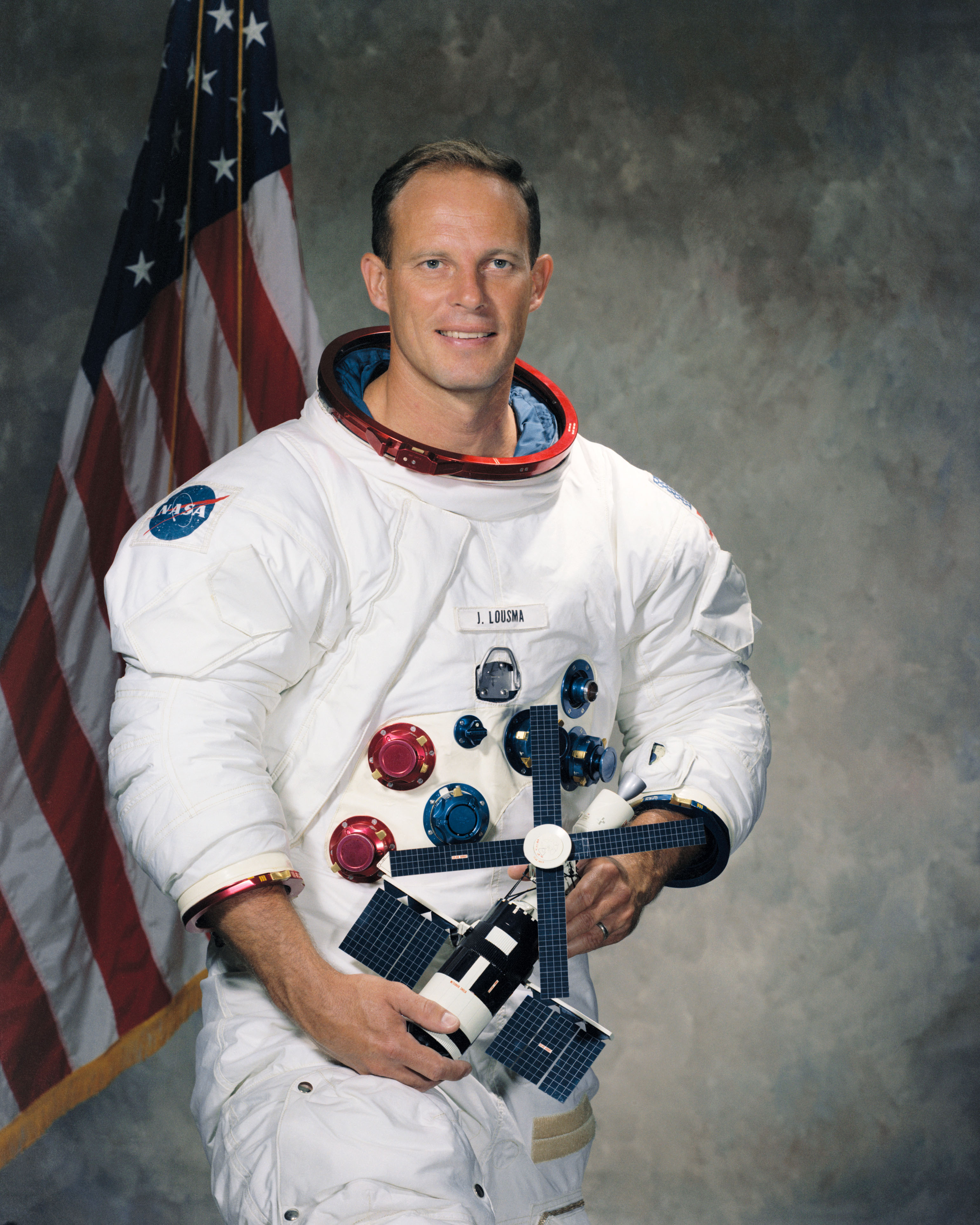
Jack R. Lousma

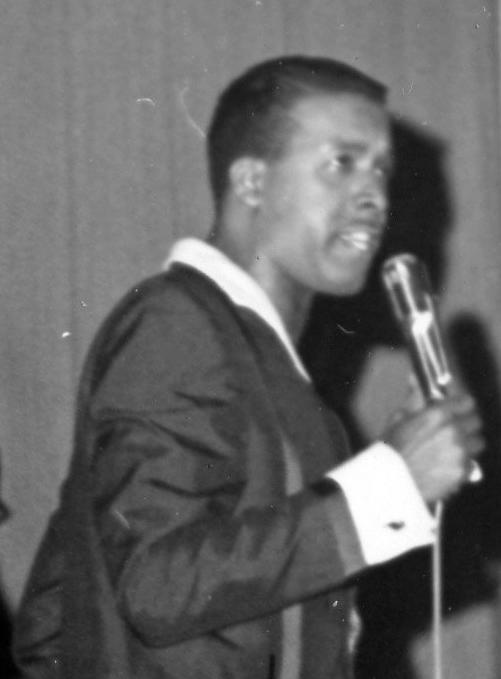
Levi Stubbs

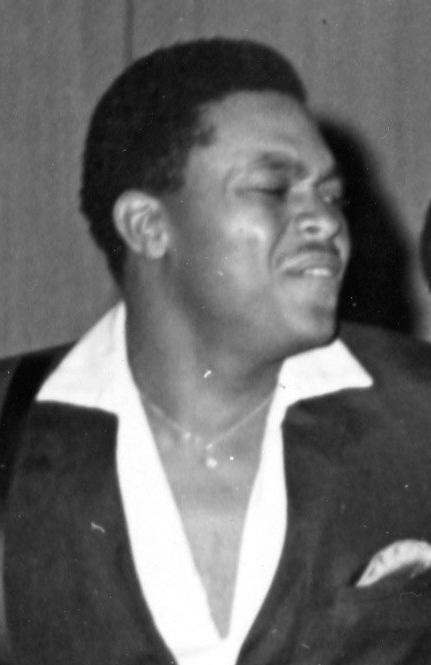
Renaldo Benson

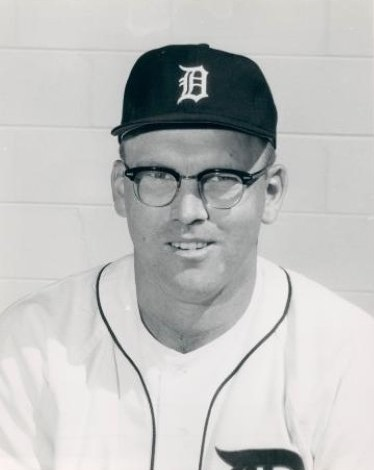
Fred Gladding

== Deaths ==
- January 18 - John Biddle, Detroit native, career Army officer, superintendent of the U.S. Military Academy, at age 76 in San Antonio, Texas
- February 3 - Charles B. Warren, U.S. Ambassador to Mexico (1924) and Japan (1921-1922), at age 65 in Grosse Pointe, Michigan
- February 16 - Roy D. Chapin, co-founder of Hudson Motor Co. and U.S. Secretary of Commerce (1932-1933), at age 55 in Detroit
- May 19 - Joe S. Jackson, sports writer and founder of Baseball Writers' Association of America, at age 64 in San Francisco
- September 20 - Perce Wilson, quarterback for Detroit Heralds in 1920, the first season of the NFL, at age 46
- October 22 - James J. Couzens, Mayor of Detroit (1919-1922) and U.S. Senator (1922-1936), at age 64 in Detroit
- October 31 - Deacon McGuire, Major League Baseball player (1884-1912), only person to play for Detroit Wolverines and Detroit Tigers, at age 72 in Duck Lake, Michigan
- November 6 - Henry Bourne Joy, President of the Packard Motor Car Company (1909-1926) and one of the organizers of the Lincoln Highway Association, at age 71
- November 30 - Fred W. Green, Governor of Michigan (1927-1931), at age 65 in Munising, Michigan

=== Gallery of 1936 deaths ===
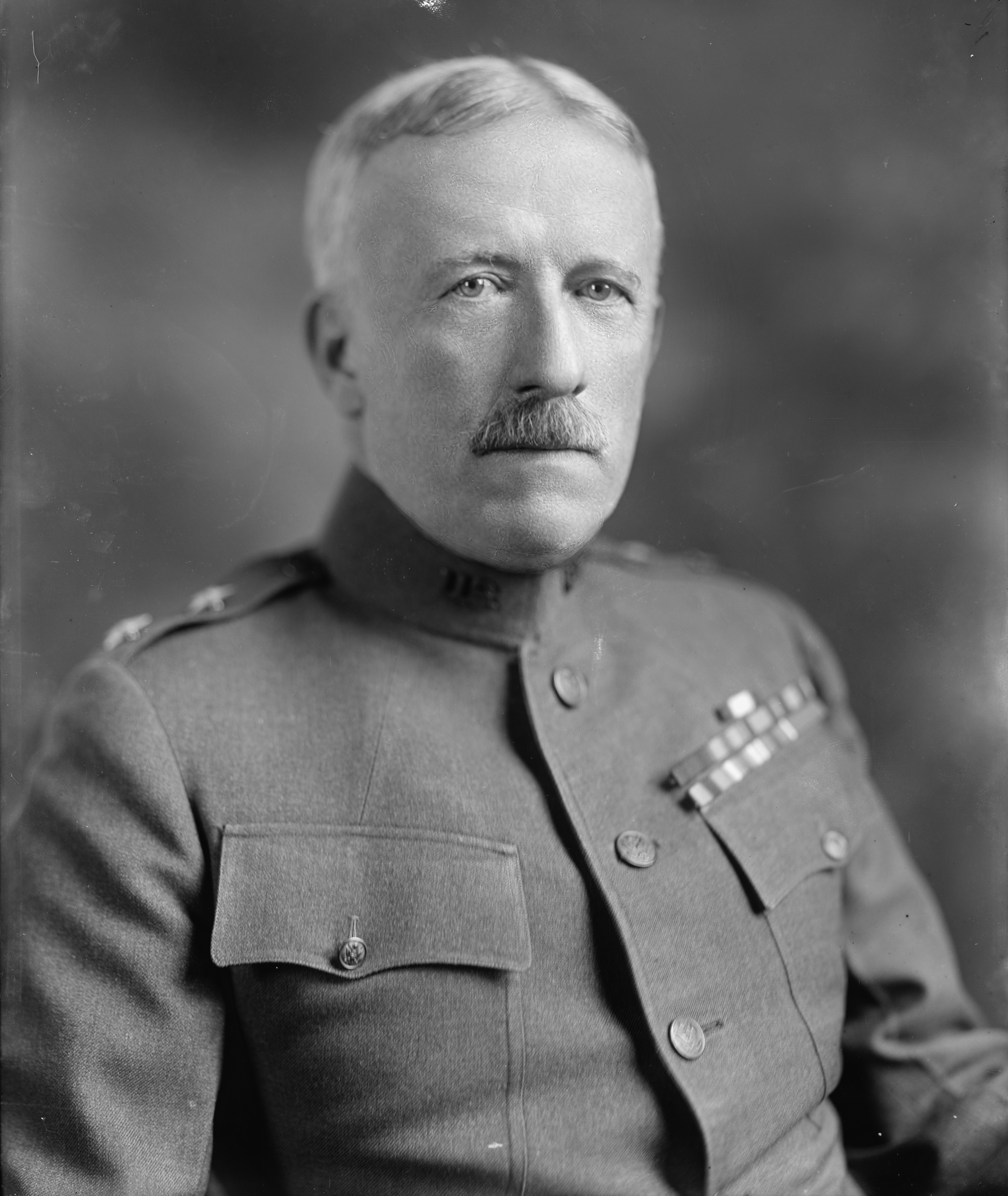
John Biddle

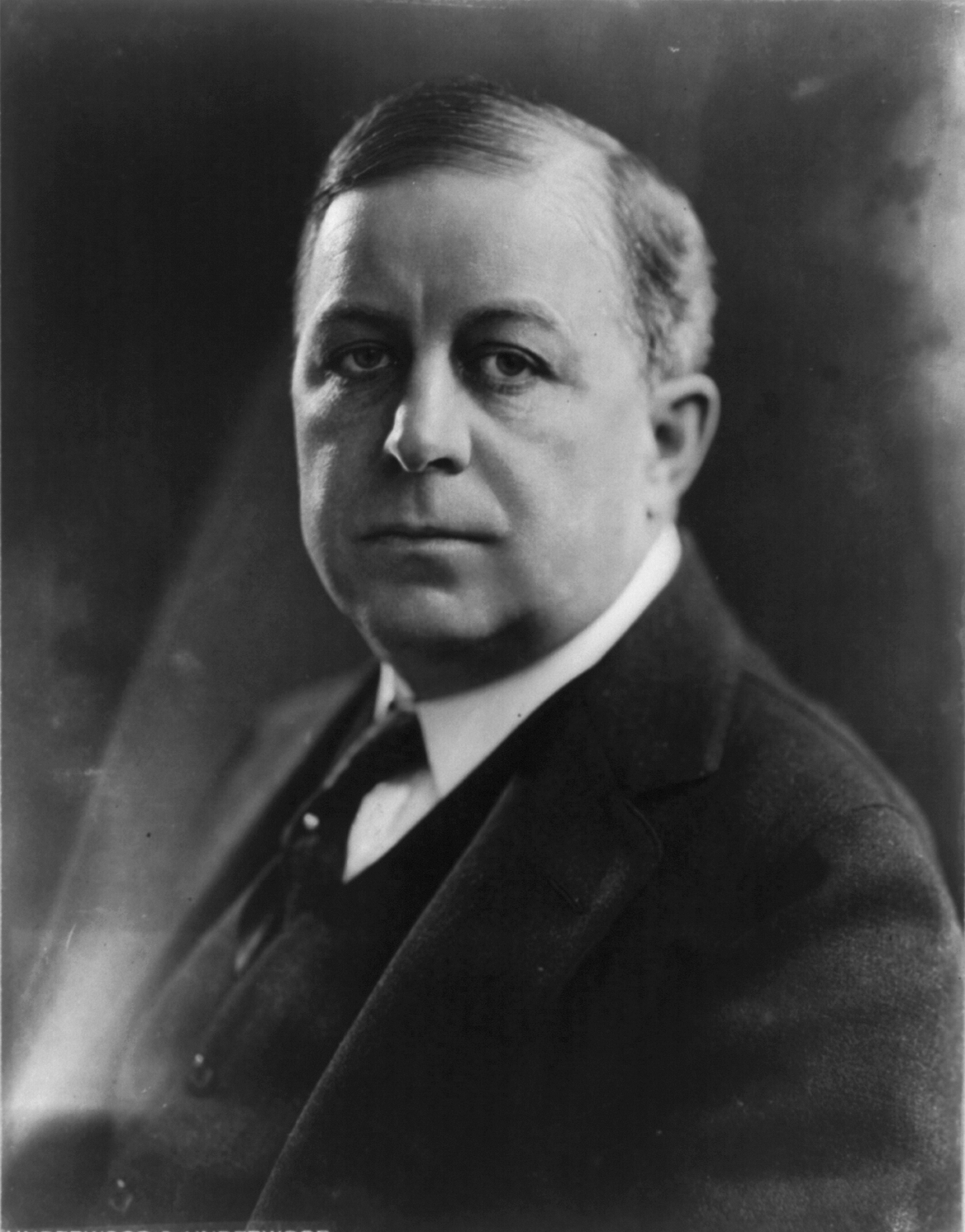
Charles B. Warren

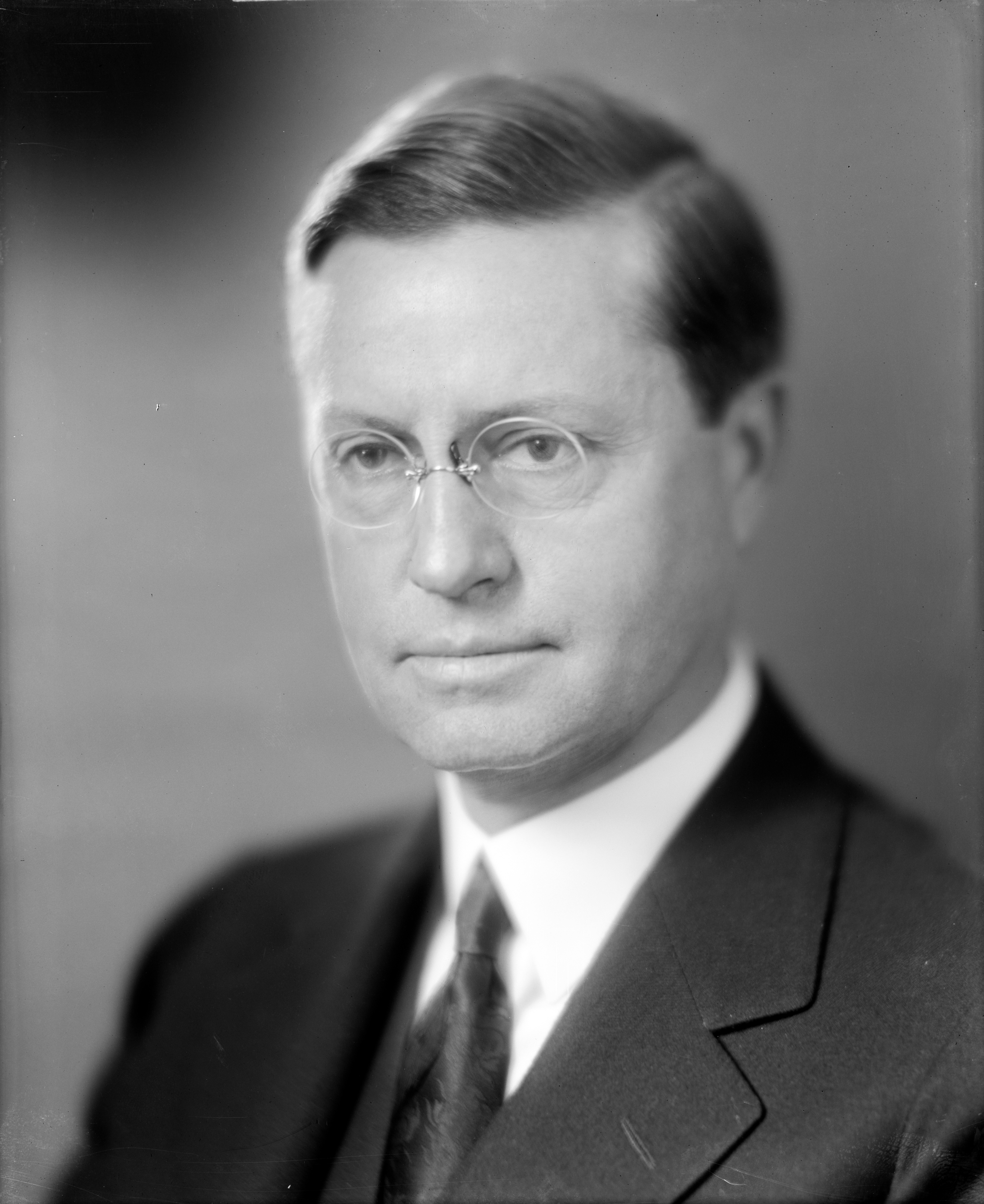
Roy D. Chapin

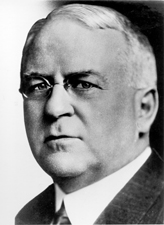
James J. Couzens

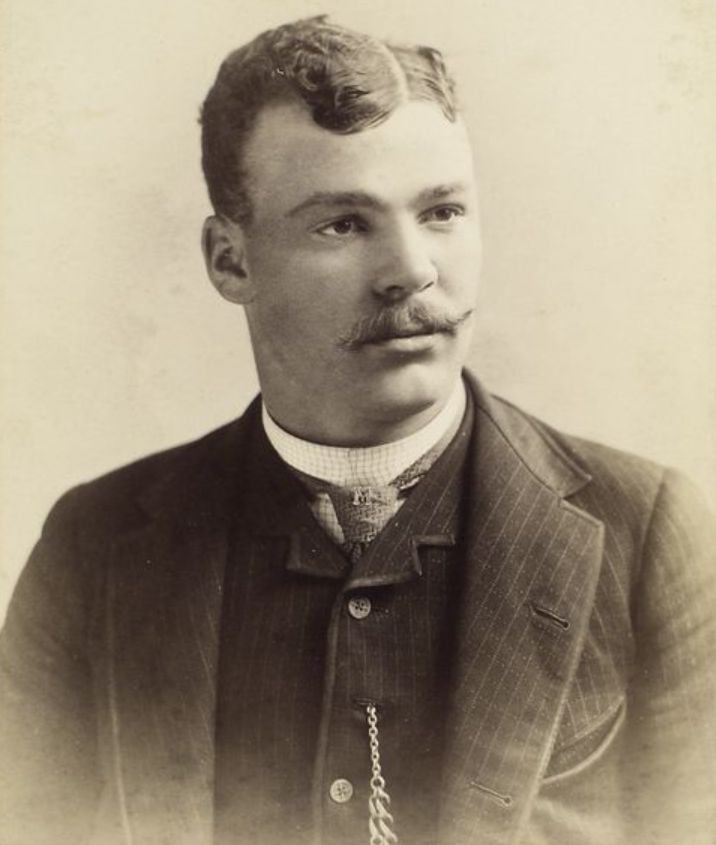
Deacon McGuire

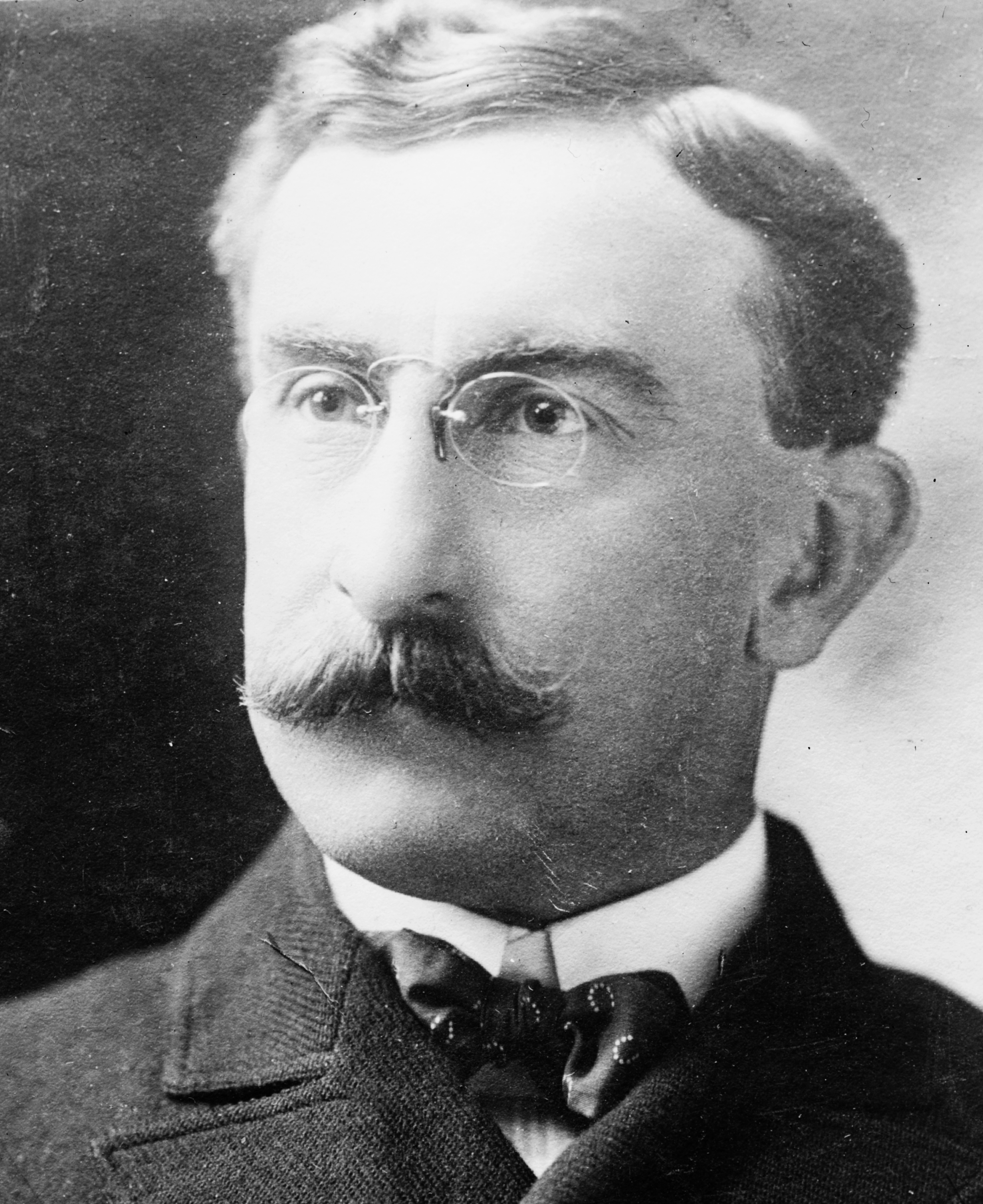
Henry Bourne Joy

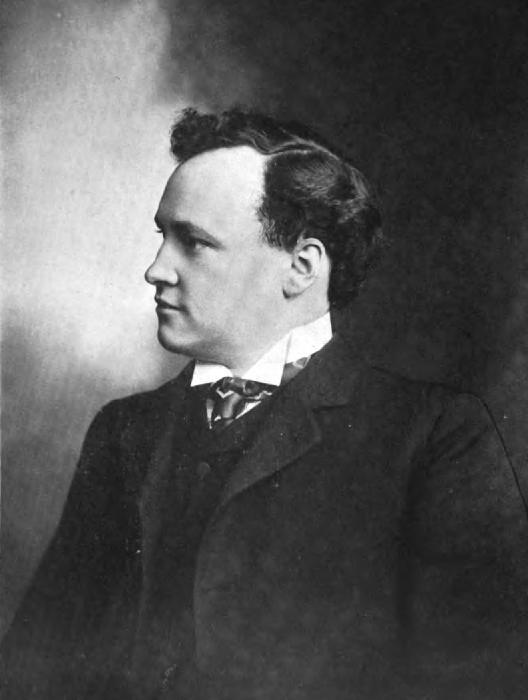
Fred W. Green

== See also ==
- History of Michigan
- History of Detroit
