= Ellsworth Township, Michigan =

- Civil township
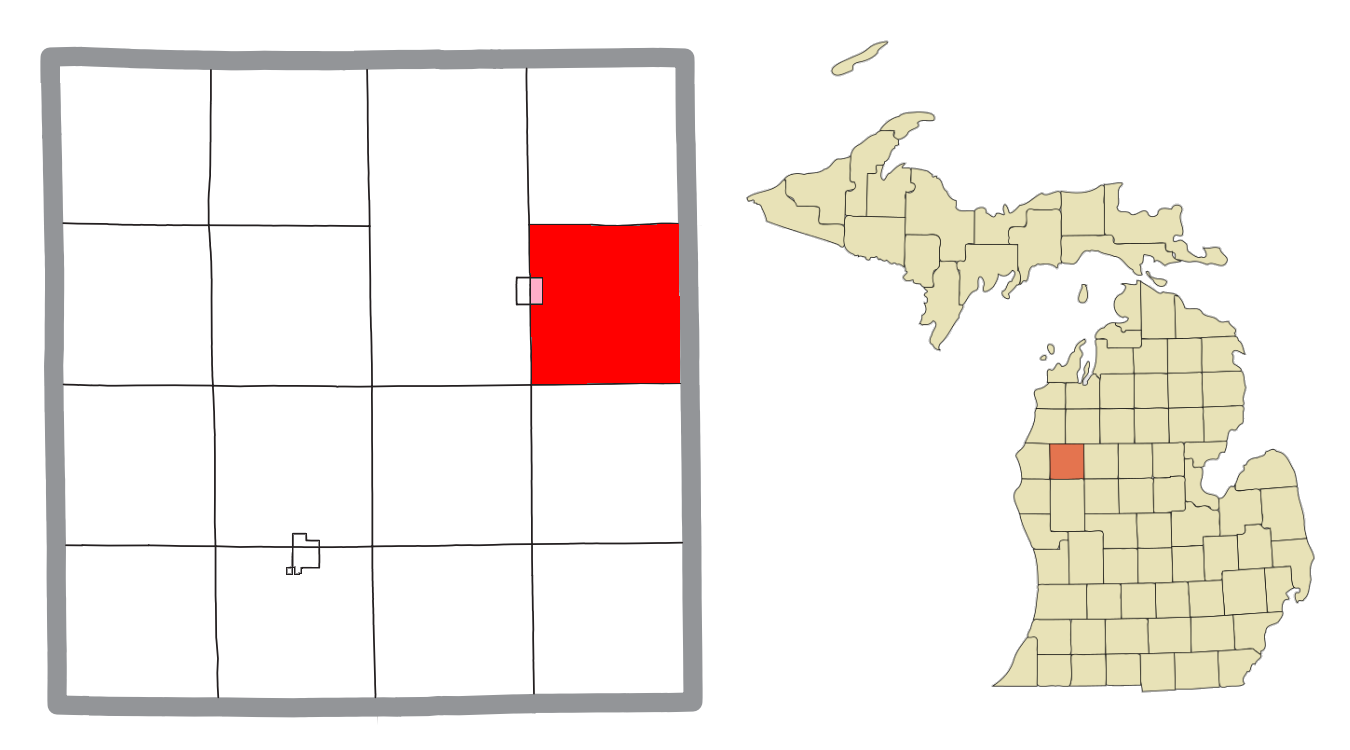
- Location within Lake County (red) and an administered portion of the Luther village (pink)

- Location within the state of Michigan Location within the United States
- Coordinates: 44°01′40″N 85°39′10″W
- Country: United States
- State: Michigan
- County: Lake

Area
  - Total: 35.4 sq mi (91.6 km^{2})
  - Land: 35.2 sq mi (91.1 km^{2})
  - Water: 0.19 sq mi (0.5 km^{2})
- Elevation: 1,165 ft (355 m)

Population (2020)
  - Total: 736
  - Density: 20.9/sq mi (8.08/km^{2})
- Time zone: UTC-5 (Eastern (EST))
  - Summer (DST): UTC-4 (EDT)
- FIPS code: 26-25440
- GNIS feature ID: 1626230
- Website: https://www.ellsworthtownship.com/

Ellsworth Township is a civil township of Lake County in the U.S. state of Michigan. The population was 736 at the 2020 census.

== Communities ==
- Copley was an unincorporated community in Ellsworth Township that developed around a sawmill. It had a post office from 1884 to 1890.
- Edgetts was a lumber settlement with a railroad station. It had a post office starting in 1902.
- Ellsworth is a community in Ellsworth Township. It was established in 1867. It had a post office from 1872 until 1876.

== Geography ==
According to the United States Census Bureau, the township has a total area of 35.4 square miles (92 km^{2}), of which 35.2 square miles (91 km^{2}) is land and 0.2 square miles (0.52 km^{2}) (0.57%) is water.

== Demographics ==
As of the census of 2000, there were 821 people, 309 households, and 221 families residing in the township. The population density was 23.3 inhabitants per square mile (9.0/km^{2}). There were 557 housing units at an average density of 15.8 per square mile (6.1/km^{2}). The racial makeup of the township was 97.20% White, 0.49% African American, 0.61% Native American, 0.73% from other races, and 0.97% from two or more races. Hispanic or Latino of any race were 0.97% of the population.

There were 309 households, out of which 33.3% had children under the age of 18 living with them, 62.8% were married couples living together, 6.8% had a female householder with no husband present, and 28.2% were non-families. 23.3% of all households were made up of individuals, and 9.7% had someone living alone who was 65 years of age or older. The average household size was 2.63 and the average family size was 3.13.

In the township the population was spread out, with 29.0% under the age of 18, 4.4% from 18 to 24, 30.7% from 25 to 44, 22.8% from 45 to 64, and 13.2% who were 65 years of age or older. The median age was 38 years. For every 100 females, there were 95.9 males. For every 100 females age 18 and over, there were 103.8 males.

The median income for a household in the township was $35,489, and the median income for a family was $37,279. Males had a median income of $33,250 versus $25,104 for females. The per capita income for the township was $15,927. About 8.1% of families and 10.7% of the population were below the poverty line, including 11.8% of those under age 18 and 9.3% of those age 65 or over.
