= 1933 Marquette Golden Avalanche football team =

American college football season

1933 Marquette Golden Avalanche football
- Conference: Independent
- Record: 3–4–1
- Head coach: Frank Murray (12th season)
- Home stadium: Marquette Stadium

1933 Midwestern college football independents records
	Conf.			Overall
Team	W	L	T	W		L		T
DePaul		–		6	–	0	–	1
Detroit		–		7	–	1	–	0
Michigan State Normal		–		5	–	2	–	0
Saint Louis		–		6	–	3	–	0
Central State (MI)		–		5	–	2	–	1
Michigan State		–		4	–	2	–	2
Missouri Mines		–		4	–	3	–	0
Michigan Tech		–		2	–	2	–	0
Western State Teachers		–		3	–	3	–	1
Marquette		–		3	–	4	–	1
Notre Dame		–		3	–	5	–	1
Haskell		–		2	–	6	–	3
Detroit City		–		2	–	5	–	1

The 1933 Marquette Golden Avalanche football team was an American football team that represented Marquette University as an independent during the 1933 college football season. In its 12th season under head coach Frank Murray, the team compiled a 3–4–1 record and was outscored by a total of 82 to 62. The team played its home games at Marquette Stadium in Milwaukee.

Frank Murray was Marquette's head football coach for 19 years and was posthumously inducted into the College Football Hall of Fame in 1983.

== Schedule ==
Date	Opponent	Site	Result	Attendance	Source
September 30	at Lawrence	Marquette Stadium; Milwaukee, WI	W 8–0		
October 7	at Wisconsin	Camp Randall Stadium; Madison, WI	L 0–19	20,000	
October 14	Ole Miss	Marquette Stadium; Milwaukee, WI	L 0–7	8,000	
October 21	Michigan State	Marquette Stadium; Milwaukee, WI	L 0–6	2,000	
October 28	at Detroit	University of Detroit Stadium; Detroit, MI	L 6–22	10,000	
November 4	at West Virginia	Mountaineer Field; Morgantown, WV	T 13–13		
November 11	Creighton	Marquette Stadium; Milwaukee, WI	W 14–9		
November 18	at Saint Louis	Walsh Stadium; St. Louis, MO	W 21–6	6,206	
