= 1933 Drake Bulldogs football team =

American college football season

1933 Drake Bulldogs football
- Conference: Missouri Valley Conference
- Record: 6–3–1 (5–1 MVC)
- Head coach: Vee Green (1st season)
- Home stadium: Drake Stadium

1933 Missouri Valley Conference football standings
	Conf.					Overall
Team	W		L		T	W		L		T
Oklahoma A&M $	2	–	0	–	0	6	–	2	–	1
Drake	5	–	1	–	0	6	–	3	–	1
Creighton	2	–	2	–	0	3	–	4	–	1
Washington University	1	–	2	–	0	4	–	5	–	0
Butler	0	–	2	–	0	2	–	6	–	0
Grinnell	0	–	3	–	0	0	–	8	–	1
$ – Conference champion

The 1933 Drake Bulldogs football team was an American football team that represented Drake University in the Missouri Valley Conference (MVC) during the 1933 college football season. In its first season under head coach Vee Green, the team compiled a 6–3–1 record (5–1 against MVC opponents), finished second in the conference, and was outscored by a total of 105 to 74.

== Schedule ==
Date	Time	Opponent	Site	Result	Attendance	Source
September 23		Simpson*	Drake Stadium; Des Moines, IA	W 14–7		
September 30		at Illinois*	Memorial Stadium; Champaign, IL	L 6–13	25,788	
October 7		Butler	Drake Stadium; Des Moines, IA (rivalry)	W 26–6		
October 13		Creighton	Drake Stadium; Des Moines, IA	W 6–0		
October 21		Grinnell	Drake Stadium; Des Moines, IA	W 13–0		
October 28	2:30 p.m.	at Washington University	Francis Field; St. Louis, MO	W 6–0	5,500	
November 4		at Temple*	Temple Stadium; Philadelphia, PA	L 14–20		
November 11		at Oklahoma A&M	Lewis Field; Stillwater, OK	L 0–21		
November 18		at Grinnell	Grinnell, IA	W 13–0		
November 25		Iowa State*^{†}	Drake Stadium; Des Moines, IA	T 7–7		
*Non-conference game; ^{†}Homecoming; All times are in Central time
