= 1933 DePaul Blue Demons football team =

American college football season

1933 DePaul Blue Demons football
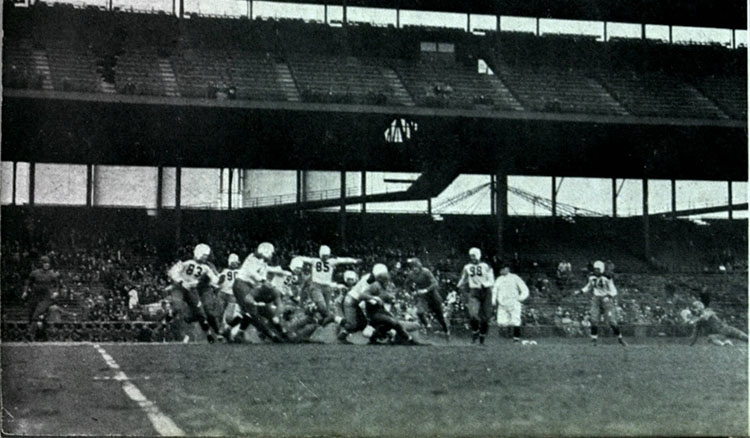
- DePaul defeats South Dakota at Wrigley Field on November 4
- Conference: Independent
- Record: 6–0–1
- Head coach: Jim Kelly & Ben Connor (2nd season)
- Home stadium: Wrigley Field, Loyola Field, Mills Stadium

1933 Midwestern college football independents records
	Conf.			Overall
Team	W	L	T	W		L		T
DePaul		–		6	–	0	–	1
Detroit		–		7	–	1	–	0
Michigan State Normal		–		5	–	2	–	0
Saint Louis		–		6	–	3	–	0
Central State (MI)		–		5	–	2	–	1
Michigan State		–		4	–	2	–	2
Missouri Mines		–		4	–	3	–	0
Michigan Tech		–		2	–	2	–	0
Western State Teachers		–		3	–	3	–	1
Marquette		–		3	–	4	–	1
Notre Dame		–		3	–	5	–	1
Haskell		–		2	–	6	–	3
Detroit City		–		2	–	5	–	1

The 1933 DePaul Blue Demons football team was an American football team that represented DePaul University as an independent during the 1933 college football season. The team compiled a 6–0–1 record, shut out five of seven opponents, and outscored all opponents by a total of 119 to 12. The team played its home games at Wrigley Field, Loyola Field, and Mills Stadium in Chicago. Jim Kelly and Ben Connor were the coaches.

== Schedule ==
Date	Opponent	Site	Result	Attendance	Source
September 29	Omaha	Loyola Field; Chicago, IL	W 19–0		
October 7	Valparaiso	Mills Stadium; Chicago, IL	W 24–0		
October 15	at St. Ambrose	Municipal Stadium; Davenport, IA	W 6–0	3,000	
October 21	at Niagara	Niagara Falls, NY	W 18–0		
October 28	at Western State Teachers (MI)	Western State Teachers College Field; Kalamazoo, MI	W 25–6		
November 4	South Dakota	Wrigley Field; Chicago, IL	W 20–0		
November 11	St. Thomas (MN)	Wrigley Field; Chicago, IL	T 6–6		
