= Edward W. Staebler =

American politician

Mayor of Ann Arbor
- In office 1926–1931
- Preceded by: Robert A. Campbell
- Succeeded by: H. Wirt Newkirk

Personal details
- Born: December 26, 1872 Lodi Township, Michigan, US
- Died: November 10, 1946 (aged 73)
- Party: Democratic
- Spouse: Magdalena Dold
- Children: Neil

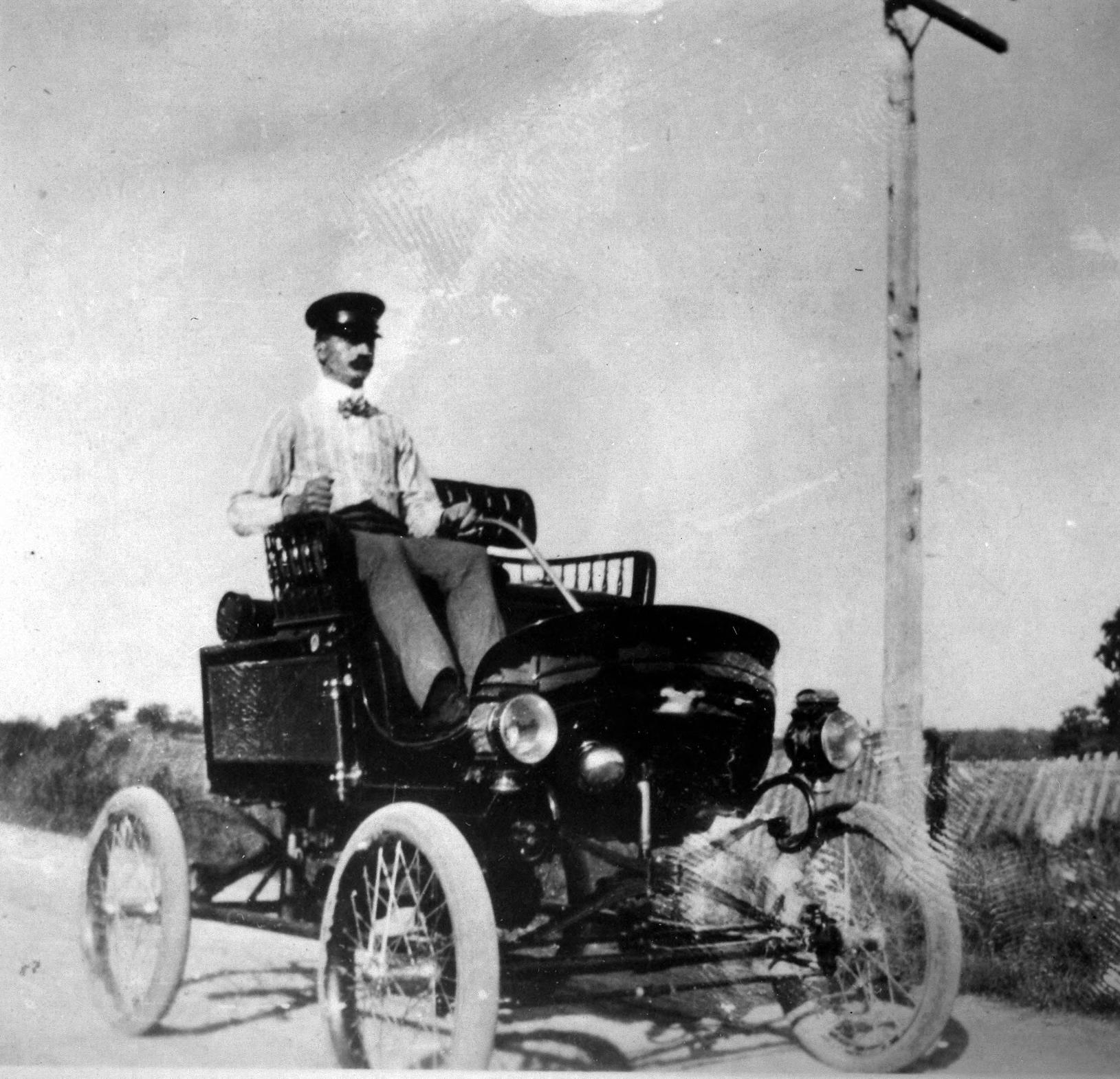
Staebler in a Toledo steamer car (c. 1901)

Edward William Staebler (December 26, 1872 – November 10, 1946) was a Michigan politician.

== Early life ==
Edward W. Staebler was born in Lodi Township, Michigan to parents Michael and Katherine Rosina Staebler on December 26, 1872. Staebler was of German ancestry.

== Career ==
Staebler was involved with an early automobile dealership in the city of Ann Arbor, Michigan. Staebler served as mayor of Ann Arbor from 1926 to 1931. Staebler was a Democrat. In 1932, Staebler ran unsuccessfully for the Michigan State House of Representatives representing Washtenaw County.

== Personal life ==
Staebler married Magdalena Dold in 1895. Together, they had at least two children including U.S. Representative Neil Staebler.

== Death ==
Staebler died on November 10, 1946.
