= 1933 Creighton Bluejays football team =

American college football season

1933 Creighton Bluejays football
- Conference: Missouri Valley Conference
- Record: 3–4–1 (2–2 MVC)
- Head coach: Arthur R. Stark (4th season)
- Home stadium: Creighton Stadium

1933 Missouri Valley Conference football standings
	Conf.					Overall
Team	W		L		T	W		L		T
Oklahoma A&M $	2	–	0	–	0	6	–	2	–	1
Drake	5	–	1	–	0	6	–	3	–	1
Creighton	2	–	2	–	0	3	–	4	–	1
Washington University	1	–	2	–	0	4	–	5	–	0
Butler	0	–	2	–	0	2	–	6	–	0
Grinnell	0	–	3	–	0	0	–	8	–	1
$ – Conference champion

The 1933 Creighton Bluejays football team was an American football team that represented Creighton University as a member of the Missouri Valley Conference (MVC) during the 1933 college football season. In its fourth and final season under head coach Arthur R. Stark, the team compiled a 3–4–1 record (2–2 against MVC opponents) and was outscored by a total of 80 to 60. The team played its home games at Creighton Stadium in Omaha, Nebraska.

== Schedule ==
Date	Time	Opponent	Site	Result	Attendance	Source
September 30		Kansas*	Creighton Stadium; Omaha, NE	L 0–14		
October 7		Haskell*	Creighton Stadium; Omaha, NE	T 0–0	8,000	
October 13		at Drake	Des Moines, IA	L 0–6		
October 21		Rice*	Creighton Stadium; Omaha, NE	W 14–13		
October 27		at Grinnell	Grinnell, IA	W 6–0		
November 4	2:30 p.m.	Washington University	Creighton Stadium; Omaha, NE	W 18–0	6,000	
November 11		at Marquette*	Marquette Stadium; Milwaukee, WI	L 9–14		
November 18		Oklahoma A&M	Creighton Stadium; Omaha, NE	L 13–33		
*Non-conference game; All times are in Central time
