= 1933 Washington University Bears football team =

American college football season

1933 Washington University Bears football
- Conference: Missouri Valley Conference
- Record: 4–5 (1–2 MVC)
- Head coach: Jimmy Conzelman (2nd season)
- Captain: Glyn Clark
- Home stadium: Francis Field

1933 Missouri Valley Conference football standings
	Conf.					Overall
Team	W		L		T	W		L		T
Oklahoma A&M $	2	–	0	–	0	6	–	2	–	1
Drake	5	–	1	–	0	6	–	3	–	1
Creighton	2	–	2	–	0	3	–	4	–	1
Washington University	1	–	2	–	0	4	–	5	–	0
Butler	0	–	2	–	0	2	–	6	–	0
Grinnell	0	–	3	–	0	0	–	8	–	1
$ – Conference champion

The 1933 Washington University Bears football team represented Washington University in St. Louis as a member of the Missouri Valley Conference (MVC) during the 1933 college football season. Led by second-year head coach Jimmy Conzelman, the Bears compiled an overall record of 4–5 with a mark of 1–2 in conference play, placing fourth in the MVC.

== Schedule ==
Date	Time	Opponent	Site	Result	Attendance	Source
September 30	8:00 p.m.	McKendree*	Francis Field; St. Louis, MO	W 22–7	6,000	
October 7	2:30 p.m.	Illinois*	Francis Field; St. Louis, MO	L 6–21	11,220	
October 14	2:30 p.m.	Chicago*	Francis Field; St. Louis, MO	L 0–40	7,000	
October 20	8:15 p.m.	Bradley*	Francis Field; St. Louis, MO	W 19–7	5,522	
October 28	2:30 p.m.	Drake	Francis Field; St. Louis, MO	L 0–6	5,500	
November 4	2:30 p.m.	at Creighton	Creighton Stadium; Omaha, NE	L 0–18	6,000	
November 11	2:00 p.m.	Butler	Francis Field; St. Louis, MO	W 36–12	4,090	
November 18		Missouri*^{†}	Francis Field; St. Louis, MO	W 33–7	8,160	
November 30	2:00 p.m.	Saint Louis*	Francis Field; St. Louis, MO	L 0–6	16,004	
*Non-conference game; ^{†}Homecoming; All times are in Central time
