= 1933 Oklahoma A&M Cowboys football team =

American college football season

1933 Oklahoma A&M Cowboys football

MVC champion
- Conference: Missouri Valley Conference
- Record: 6–2–1 (2–0 MVC)
- Head coach: Pappy Waldorf (5th season)
- Home stadium: Lewis Field

1933 Missouri Valley Conference football standings
	Conf.					Overall
Team	W		L		T	W		L		T
Oklahoma A&M $	2	–	0	–	0	6	–	2	–	1
Drake	5	–	1	–	0	6	–	3	–	1
Creighton	2	–	2	–	0	3	–	4	–	1
Washington University	1	–	2	–	0	4	–	5	–	0
Butler	0	–	2	–	0	2	–	6	–	0
Grinnell	0	–	3	–	0	0	–	8	–	1
$ – Conference champion

The 1933 Oklahoma A&M Cowboys football team represented Oklahoma A&M College in the 1933 college football season. This was the 33rd year of football at A&M and the fifth under Pappy Waldorf. The Cowboys played their home games at Lewis Field in Stillwater, Oklahoma. They finished the season 6–2–1, 2–0 in the Missouri Valley Conference.

== Schedule ==
Date	Time	Opponent	Site	Result	Attendance	Source
September 29		Central State Teachers*	Lewis Field; Stillwater, OK	W 20–12		
October 6		Colorado*	Lewis Field; Stillwater, OK	L 0–6		
October 13		at Oklahoma City*	Goldbug Field; Oklahoma City, OK	L 13–19	10,000	
October 21	3:00 p.m.	at SMU*	Fair Park Stadium; Dallas, TX	T 7–7		
October 27		Haskell*	Lewis Field; Stillwater, OK	W 18–0		
November 4		at Tulsa*	Skelly Field; Tulsa, OK (rivalry)	W 7–0		
November 11		Drake^{†}	Lewis Field; Stillwater, OK	W 21–0		
November 18		Creighton	Lewis Field; Stillwater, OK	W 33–13		
November 23		at Oklahoma*	Oklahoma Memorial Stadium; Norman, OK (Bedlam Series)	W 13–0		
*Non-conference game; ^{†}Homecoming; All times are in Central time
