= 1933 Saint Louis Billikens football team =

American college football season

1933 Saint Louis Billikens football

Missouri state champion
- Conference: Independent
- Record: 6–3
- Head coach: Chile Walsh (4th season)
- Home stadium: Edward J. Walsh Memorial Stadium

1933 Midwestern college football independents records
	Conf.			Overall
Team	W	L	T	W		L		T
DePaul		–		6	–	0	–	1
Detroit		–		7	–	1	–	0
Michigan State Normal		–		5	–	2	–	0
Saint Louis		–		6	–	3	–	0
Central State (MI)		–		5	–	2	–	1
Michigan State		–		4	–	2	–	2
Missouri Mines		–		4	–	3	–	0
Michigan Tech		–		2	–	2	–	0
Western State Teachers		–		3	–	3	–	1
Marquette		–		3	–	4	–	1
Notre Dame		–		3	–	5	–	1
Haskell		–		2	–	6	–	3
Detroit City		–		2	–	5	–	1

The 1933 Saint Louis Billikens football team was an American football team that represented Saint Louis University as an independent during the 1933 college football season. In its fourth and final season under head coach Chile Walsh, the team compiled a 6–3 record and outscored opponents by a total of 129 to 77. Having beaten Missouri, Missouri Mines, and Washington University, the team was declared the Missouri state champion. Home games were played at Walsh Stadium in St. Louis.

== Schedule ==
Date	Time	Opponent	Site	Result	Attendance	Source
September 30		James Millikin	Walsh Stadium; St. Louis, MO	W 32–0		
October 6		Kansas State	Walsh Stadium; St. Louis, MO	L 14–20		
October 14		at Grinnell	Grinnell, IA	W 19–13		
October 21		Missouri	Walsh Stadium; St. Louis, MO	W 13–7	12,000	
October 28		Loyola (LA)	Walsh Stadium; St. Louis, MO	L 6–16	7,263	
November 4		at Wichita	Wichita, KS	W 7–0		
November 11		Missouri Mines	Walsh Stadium; St. Louis, MO	W 26–0		
November 18		Marquette	Walsh Stadium; St. Louis, MO	L 6–21	6,206	
November 30	2:00 p.m.	at Washington University	Francis Field; St. Louis, MO	W 6–0	16,004	
All times are in Central time
