= 1933 Haskell Indians football team =

American college football season

1933 Haskell Indians football
- Conference: Independent
- Record: 2–6–3
- Head coach: Gus Welch (1st season)
- Captains: Orien Crow; Oliver Duffina

1933 Midwestern college football independents records
	Conf.			Overall
Team	W	L	T	W		L		T
DePaul		–		6	–	0	–	1
Detroit		–		7	–	1	–	0
Michigan State Normal		–		5	–	2	–	0
Saint Louis		–		6	–	3	–	0
Central State (MI)		–		5	–	2	–	1
Michigan State		–		4	–	2	–	2
Missouri Mines		–		4	–	3	–	0
Michigan Tech		–		2	–	2	–	0
Western State Teachers		–		3	–	3	–	1
Marquette		–		3	–	4	–	1
Notre Dame		–		3	–	5	–	1
Haskell		–		2	–	6	–	3
Detroit City		–		2	–	5	–	1

The 1933 Haskell Indians football team was an American football team that represented the Haskell Institute—now known as Haskell Indian Nations University—as an independent during the 1933 college football season. Haskell compiled a record of 2–6–3.

After the 1932 season, William Henry Dietz resigned his post as Haskell's head coach to coach in the National Football League. Gus Welch, a full-blood Chippewa, was hired to replace him. Welch was assisted during the 1933 season by Egbert Ward and John Levi.

Key players included quarterback Ed Wapp of the Sac and Fox tribe, fullback Lofa Hayes of the Euchee tribe, and halfback Pete Cimino of the Chippewa tribe.

Orien Crow was elected as the team captain, but he left the team to play professional football. On November 2, halfback Oliver Duffina was elected to replace Crow as captain for the remainder of the season.

== Schedule ==
Date	Time	Opponent	Site	Result	Attendance	Source
September 22		St. Benedict's	Lawrence, KS	W 25–0		
September 29		at Washburn	Topeka, KS	W 6–0		
October 7		at Creighton	Creighton Stadium; Omaha, NE	T 0–0	8,000	
October 13	7:30 p.m.	at Temple	Temple Stadium; Philadelphia, PA	L 0–31	20,000	
October 20		Emporia Teachers	Lawrence, KS	T 0–0		
October 27		at Oklahoma A&M	Lewis Field; Stillwater, OK	L 0–18		
November 4	8:00 p.m.	at Texas Tech	Tech Field; Lubbock, TX	L 6–26		
November 11		Grinnell	Lawrence, KS	T 0–0		
November 18	2:30 p.m.	at Wichita	Wichita University Field; Wichita, KS	L 6–28		
November 30	1:30 p.m.	at Xavier	Corcoran Field; Cincinnati, OH	L 13–24	10,500	
December 25		at Tampa	Plant Field; Tampa, FL	L 0–7	5,000	
All times are in Central time
