= 1933 Notre Dame Fighting Irish football team =

American college football season

1933 Notre Dame Fighting Irish football
- Conference: Independent
- Record: 3–5–1
- Head coach: Hunk Anderson (3rd season)
- Captains: Hugh Devore; Tom Gorman
- Home stadium: Notre Dame Stadium

1933 Midwestern college football independents records
	Conf.			Overall
Team	W	L	T	W		L		T
DePaul		–		6	–	0	–	1
Detroit		–		7	–	1	–	0
Michigan State Normal		–		5	–	2	–	0
Saint Louis		–		6	–	3	–	0
Central State (MI)		–		5	–	2	–	1
Michigan State		–		4	–	2	–	2
Missouri Mines		–		4	–	3	–	0
Michigan Tech		–		2	–	2	–	0
Western State Teachers		–		3	–	3	–	1
Marquette		–		3	–	4	–	1
Notre Dame		–		3	–	5	–	1
Haskell		–		2	–	6	–	3
Detroit City		–		2	–	5	–	1

The 1933 Notre Dame Fighting Irish football team was an American football team that represented the University of Notre Dame as an independent during the 1933 college football season. In their third and final year under head coach Hunk Anderson, the Fighting Irish compiled a 3–5–1, failed to score in six of nine games, and were outscored in all games by a total of 80 to 32. It was Notre Dame's only losing season between 1888 and 1955.

End Hugh Devore received third-team honors from the Associated Press on the 1933 All-America college football team. Devore and Tom Gorman were the team captains.

The team played its home games at Notre Dame Stadium in Notre Dame, Indiana.

== Schedule ==
Date	Opponent	Site	Result	Attendance	Source
October 7	Kansas	Notre Dame Stadium; Notre Dame, IN	T 0–0	9,221	
October 14	at Indiana	Memorial Stadium; Bloomington, IN	W 12–2	15,152	
October 21	at Carnegie Tech	Pitt Stadium; Pittsburgh, PA	L 0–7	45,890–57,000	
October 28	Pittsburgh	Notre Dame Stadium; Notre Dame, IN (rivalry)	L 0–14	16,627–25,000	
November 4	vs. Navy	Municipal Stadium; Baltimore, MD (rivalry)	L 0–7	34,579	
November 11	Purdue	Notre Dame Stadium; Notre Dame, IN (rivalry)	L 0–19	27,476	
November 18	at Northwestern	Dyche Stadium; Evanston, IL (rivalry)	W 7–0	31,182–40,000	
November 25	USC	Notre Dame Stadium; South Bend, IN (rivalry)	L 0–19	25,037	
December 2	vs. Army	Yankee Stadium; Bronx, NY (rivalry)	W 13–12	73,594	
