= H. Wirt Newkirk =

American politician

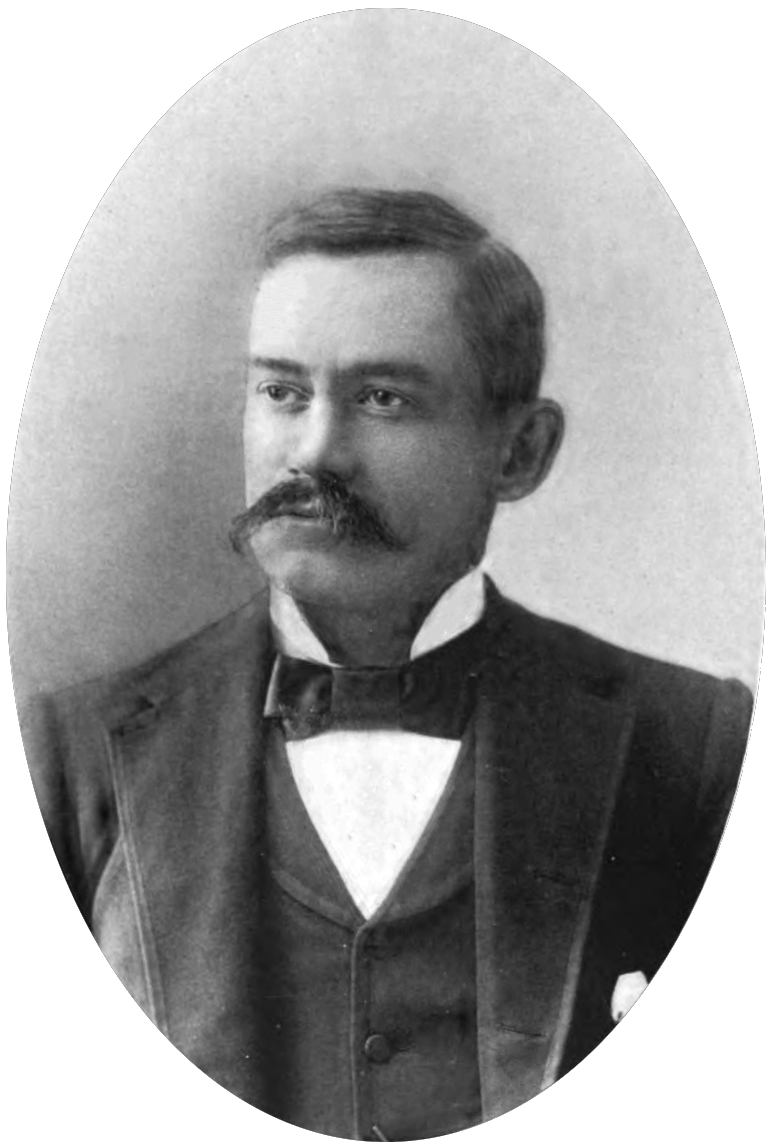

Mayor of Ann Arbor
- In office 1931–1933
- Preceded by: Edward W. Staebler
- Succeeded by: Robert A. Campbell

Member of the Michigan House of Representatives from the Washtenaw County 1st district
- In office January 1, 1907 – 1910
- In office January 1, 1917 – 1918

Member of the Michigan House of Representatives from the Osceola County district
- In office January 1, 1893 – 1894

Personal details
- Born: August 1, 1854 Dexter, Michigan
- Died: April 1, 1946 (aged 91) St. Petersburg, Florida
- Party: Republican
- Education: University of Michigan Law School

Henry Wirt Newkirk (August 1, 1854 – April 1, 1946) was a Michigan politician.

== Early life ==
Newkirk was born on August 1, 1854, in Dexter, Michigan. Newkirk lived in Bay City, Michigan, in 1879.

== Education ==
Newkirk graduated from the University of Michigan Law School in 1879.

== Career ==
In 1884, Newkirk moved to Williamsburg, Kentucky, where he founded the Williamsburg Times newspaper. Newkirked moved back to Michigan in Lake County to publish Luther Enterprise in 1888. Newkirk was appointed to the position of interim Lake County prosecuting attorney in 1889. He was elected to this position in 1890, and served in it until 1892. In 1892, Newkirk was an alternate delegate to Republican National Convention from Michigan. On November 8, 1892, Newkirk was elected to the Michigan House of Representatives where he represented the Osceola County district from January 4, 1893, to 1894. Newkirk served as Washtenaw County probate judge from 1897 to 1900. In 1899, Newkirk became the namesake for Newkirk Township, Michigan. On November 6, 1906, Newkirk was elected to the Michigan House of Representatives where he represented the Washtenaw County 1st district from January 2, 1907, to 1910. He was once again elected to his position on November 7, 1916, and served from January 3, 1917, to 1918. Newkirk served as mayor of Ann Arbor from 1931 to 1933.

== Personal life ==
In 1880, Newkirk married Eleanor J. Birkett. Newkirk was a member of the Shriners, the Odd Fellows, and the Woodmen. Newkirk was a Freemason.

== Death ==
Newkirk died on April 1, 1946, in St. Petersburg, Florida.
