= 1933 Michigan State Normal Hurons football team =

American college football season

1933 Michigan State Normal Hurons football
- Conference: Independent
- Record: 6–2
- Head coach: Elton Rynearson (12th season)
- Captain: Carl Bowman
- Home stadium: Normal Field

1933 Midwestern college football independents records
| | Conf. | | | Overall |
| Team | W | L | T | W | | L | | T |
|---|---|---|---|---|---|---|---|---|
| DePaul | | – | | 6 | – | 0 | – | 1 |
| Detroit | | – | | 7 | – | 1 | – | 0 |
| Michigan State Normal | | – | | 5 | – | 2 | – | 0 |
| Saint Louis | | – | | 6 | – | 3 | – | 0 |
| Central State (MI) | | – | | 5 | – | 2 | – | 1 |
| Michigan State | | – | | 4 | – | 2 | – | 2 |
| Missouri Mines | | – | | 4 | – | 3 | – | 0 |
| Michigan Tech | | – | | 2 | – | 2 | – | 0 |
| Western State Teachers | | – | | 3 | – | 3 | – | 1 |
| Marquette | | – | | 3 | – | 4 | – | 1 |
| Notre Dame | | – | | 3 | – | 5 | – | 1 |
| Haskell | | – | | 2 | – | 6 | – | 3 |
| Detroit City | | – | | 2 | – | 5 | – | 1 |

The 1933 Michigan State Normal Hurons football team was an American football team that represented Michigan State Normal College (later renamed Eastern Michigan University) as an independent during the 1933 college football season. In their 12th season under head coach Elton Rynearson, the Hurons compiled a 6–2 record and outscored opponents by a total of 115 to 71. Carl Bowman was the team captain. The team played its home games at Normal Field on the school's campus in Ypsilanti, Michigan.

== Schedule ==
| Date | Opponent | Site | Result | Attendance | Source |
|---|---|---|---|---|---|
| September 23 | at Ferris Institute | Big Rapids, MI | W 20–0 | | |
| September 29 | at Detroit | University of Detroit Stadium; Detroit, MI | L 0–31 | 16,000 | |
| October 7 | at Northern Michigan | Marquette, MI | W 24–0 | | |
| October 13 | St. Viator | Normal Field; Ypsilanti, MI | W 13–8 | | |
| October 21 | Central State (MI) | Normal Field; Ypsilanti, MI (rivalry) | W 13–7 | | |
| October 28 | Alma | Normal Field; Ypsilanti, MI | W 19–6 | | |
| November 4 | South Dakota State^{†} | Normal Field; Ypsilanti, MI | L 7–13 | 5,000 | |
| November 11 | at Iowa State Teachers | Cedar Falls, IA | W 19–6 | | |
^{†}Homecoming
