= 1933 Detroit Titans football team =

American college football season

1933 Detroit Titans football
- Conference: Independent
- Record: 7–1
- Head coach: Gus Dorais (9th season)
- Captain: Clifford T. Marsh
- Home stadium: University of Detroit Stadium

1933 Midwestern college football independents records
| | Conf. | | | Overall |
| Team | W | L | T | W | | L | | T |
|---|---|---|---|---|---|---|---|---|
| DePaul | | – | | 6 | – | 0 | – | 1 |
| Detroit | | – | | 7 | – | 1 | – | 0 |
| Michigan State Normal | | – | | 5 | – | 2 | – | 0 |
| Saint Louis | | – | | 6 | – | 3 | – | 0 |
| Central State (MI) | | – | | 5 | – | 2 | – | 1 |
| Michigan State | | – | | 4 | – | 2 | – | 2 |
| Missouri Mines | | – | | 4 | – | 3 | – | 0 |
| Michigan Tech | | – | | 2 | – | 2 | – | 0 |
| Western State Teachers | | – | | 3 | – | 3 | – | 1 |
| Marquette | | – | | 3 | – | 4 | – | 1 |
| Notre Dame | | – | | 3 | – | 5 | – | 1 |
| Haskell | | – | | 2 | – | 6 | – | 3 |
| Detroit City | | – | | 2 | – | 5 | – | 1 |

The 1933 Detroit Titans football team represented the University of Detroit in the 1933 college football season. Detroit shut out six of eight opponents, outscored all opponents by a combined total of 157 to 20, and finished with a 7–1 record in its ninth year under head coach and College Football Hall of Fame inductee, Gus Dorais. Significant games included victories over Marquette (22–6), Holy Cross (24–0), and Michigan State (14–0), and a loss to Duquesne (14–0).

== Schedule ==
| Date | Opponent | Site | Result | Attendance | Source |
|---|---|---|---|---|---|
| September 29 | Michigan State Normal | University of Detroit Stadium; Detroit, MI | W 31–0 | 16,000 | |
| October 6 | Western State Teachers (MI) | University of Detroit Stadium; Detroit, MI | W 26–0 | 17,000 | |
| October 13 | Washington & Jefferson | University of Detroit Stadium; Detroit, MI | W 14–0 | 18,000 | |
| October 20 | at Duquesne | Forbes Field; Pittsburgh, PA | L 0–14 | > 25,000 | |
| October 28 | Marquette | University of Detroit Stadium; Detroit, MI | W 22–6 | 10,000 | |
| November 4 | Holy Cross | University of Detroit Stadium; Detroit, MI | W 24–0 | 20,000 | |
| November 11 | at Catholic University | Griffith Stadium; Washington, DC | W 26–0 | < 5,000 | |
| November 25 | Michigan State | University of Detroit Stadium; Detroit, MI | W 14–0 | 23,000 | |
