= Jim Letherer =

US civil rights activist

- Born: James M. Letherer; December 30, 1933; Saginaw, Michigan
- Died: December 18, 2001 (aged 67); Saginaw, Michigan
- Occupation: Settlement house worker
- Known for: Active work in civil rights

James M. Letherer (December 30, 1933 – December 18, 2001) was an American civil rights activist. He walked on crutches the entire 54 miles of the 1965 Selma to Montgomery march for voting rights, and in 1966 walked with Martin Luther King Jr. in James Meredith's Mississippi March Against Fear. Letherer lost his right leg to cancer when he was ten years old. Letherer has received honors by the Selma to Montgomery Interpretive Center Museum in Alabama, which hosts a life-size statue of him.

With a big heart and a tenacious spirit, he trooped with King and fellow marchers in many a Deep South protest despite not having his right leg from birth. During the 1965 Selma to Montgomery march, Letherer – who used crutches – helped keep spirits high by unswervingly shouting out cadence for his remaining leg, by chanting, "Left, left, left!"

He received mention and a verse in a book by Pete Seeger:

There was a guy named Jim Letherer who had one leg. He went all the way. There was a picture of us in the N. Y. Times and it said something about the last leg of the march. Jim said, "Hey Len, make me a verse."

— Len Chandler

Jim Letherer's leg got left
But he's still in the fight.
Been walking day and night,
Jim's left leg is all right.

Letherer was involved with a march to aid cancer research in 1984, and in 1985 he joined the 20-year reunion of the Selma to Montgomery march participants in Selma, Alabama.
