= 1933 Michigan State Spartans football team =

American college football season

1933 Michigan State Spartans football
- Conference: Independent
- Record: 4–2–2
- Head coach: Charlie Bachman (1st season)
- Offensive scheme: Notre Dame Box
- MVP: Arthur Buss
- Captain: Bernard G. McNutt
- Home stadium: College Field

1933 Midwestern college football independents records
	Conf.			Overall
Team	W	L	T	W		L		T
DePaul		–		6	–	0	–	1
Detroit		–		7	–	1	–	0
Michigan State Normal		–		5	–	2	–	0
Saint Louis		–		6	–	3	–	0
Central State (MI)		–		5	–	2	–	1
Michigan State		–		4	–	2	–	2
Missouri Mines		–		4	–	3	–	0
Michigan Tech		–		2	–	2	–	0
Western State Teachers		–		3	–	3	–	1
Marquette		–		3	–	4	–	1
Notre Dame		–		3	–	5	–	1
Haskell		–		2	–	6	–	3
Detroit City		–		2	–	5	–	1

The 1933 Michigan State Spartans football team represented Michigan State College as an independent during the 1933 college football season. In their first season under head coach Charlie Bachman, the Spartans compiled a 4–2–2 record and lost their annual rivalry game with Michigan by a 20 to 6 score. In inter-sectional play, the team defeated Syracuse (27-3) and played scoreless ties with Kansas State and Carnegie Mellon.

Tackle Art Buss was selected by the Newspaper Enterprise Association (NEA) as a second-team player and by the Associated Press (AP) and Collier's Weekly as a third-team player on the 1933 College Football All-America Team.

== Schedule ==
Date	Opponent	Site	Result	Attendance	Source
September 30	Grinnell	College Field; East Lansing, MI	W 14–0		
October 7	at Michigan	Michigan Stadium; Ann Arbor, MI (rivalry)	L 6–20	22,090	
October 14	Illinois Wesleyan	College Field; East Lansing, MI	W 20–12		
October 21	at Marquette	Marquette Stadium; Milwaukee, WI	W 6–0	2,000	
October 28	Syracuse^{†}	College Field; East Lansing, MI	W 27–3	9,000	
November 4	Kansas State	College Field; East Lansing, MI	T 0–0		
November 11	Carnegie Tech	College Field; East Lansing, MI	T 0–0		
November 25	at Detroit	University of Detroit Stadium; Detroit, MI	L 0–14	23,000	
^{†}Homecoming

== Game summaries ==
=== Michigan ===
Michigan State at Michigan

Team	1	2	3	4	Total
Michigan St.	0	0	0	6	6
• Michigan	20	0	0	0	20

- Date: October 7, 1933
- Location: Michigan Stadium
  Ann Arbor, MI
- Game attendance: 28,000
- Referee: H. B. Hackett (West Point)

On October 7, 1933, the Spartans opened their season against Michigan. Michigan won the game, 20–6, on "a misty, soggy field, with occasional misty rain" at Michigan Stadium. Michigan scored all of its points in the first quarter. Early in the game, Whitey Wistert downed the ball at the Spartans' two-yard line after a long punt by John Regeczi. The Spartans punted the ball back to Michigan, and Michigan got the ball at Michigan State's 18-yard line. Herman Everhardus ran for a touchdown, and Ted Petoskey's extra point kick was unsuccessful. Eight minutes into the game, Michigan scored again. A 37-yard punt return by Everhardus gave Michigan the ball at the Spartans' 19-yard line. On second down, Jack Heston ran for the touchdown, and Everhardus kicked the extra point. Later in the quarter, John Kowalik recovered a Michigan State fumble at the Spartans' 23-yard line. Everhardus ran for his second touchdown of the quarter and followed with his second extra point kick. Neither team scored in the second or third quarters. Early in the final period, with Michigan leading 20–0, Michigan State completed an 86-yard drive with a touchdown on a short pass from Muth to Kurt Warmbein. The touchdown was the first scored by Michigan State against Michigan in 15 years.

Charlie Bachman, in his first game as Michigan State's head coach, used a passing game to attempt a comeback. The Spartans completed five of 18 passes for 74 yards. The Wolverines completed one of four passes. After the game, Bachman told reporters: "I am pleased with the outcome of the game, despite the loss, because we got rid of that inferiority complex with Michigan. My two sophomore backs... played as if they never heard of Michigan. To them, Michigan was just another football team."
