= 1933 Central State Bearcats football team =

American college football season

1933 Central State Bearcats football
- Conference: Independent
- Record: 5–2–1
- Head coach: George Van Bibber (3rd season)
- Home stadium: Alumni Field

1933 Midwestern college football independents records
	Conf.			Overall
Team	W	L	T	W		L		T
DePaul		–		6	–	0	–	1
Detroit		–		7	–	1	–	0
Michigan State Normal		–		5	–	2	–	0
Saint Louis		–		6	–	3	–	0
Central State (MI)		–		5	–	2	–	1
Michigan State		–		4	–	2	–	2
Missouri Mines		–		4	–	3	–	0
Michigan Tech		–		2	–	2	–	0
Western State Teachers		–		3	–	3	–	1
Marquette		–		3	–	4	–	1
Notre Dame		–		3	–	5	–	1
Haskell		–		2	–	6	–	3
Detroit City		–		2	–	5	–	1

The 1933 Central State Bearcats football team represented Central State Teachers College, later renamed Central Michigan University, as an independent during the 1933 college football season. In their third and final season under head coach George Van Bibber, the Bearcats compiled a 5–2–1 record, shut out four of eight opponents, and outscored all opponents by a combined total of 164 to 58. The team lost to its in-state rivals Michigan State Normal (7–13) and Western State Teachers (0–19).

In April 1934, Van Bibber resigned as the head football coach at Central State, instead accepting a position as the head football coach and director of physical education at the University of Buffalo. Van Bibber had been a guard at Purdue, graduating in 1932. In three seasons at Central State, Van Bibber compiled a 12–9–2 record.

== Schedule ==
Date	Opponent	Site	Result	Source
September 30	St. Mary's (MI)	Alumni Field; Mount Pleasant, MI	W 53–0	
October 6	Kalamazoo	Alumni Field; Mount Pleasant, MI	W 18–13	
October 14	at Hillsdale	Hillsdale, MI	T 0–0	
October 21	at Michigan State Normal	Normal Field; Ypsilanti, MI (rivalry)	L 7–25	
October 28	Detroit City College^{†}	Alumni Field; Mount Pleasant, MI	W 26–13	
November 4	Western State Teachers	Alumni Field; Mount Pleasant, MI (rivalry)	L 0–19	
November 11	at Ferris Institute	Big Rapids, MI	W 33–0	
November 18	Alma	Alumni Field; Mount Pleasant, MI	W 27–0	
^{†}Homecoming
