= Luther, Michigan =

- Village
- Village of Luther
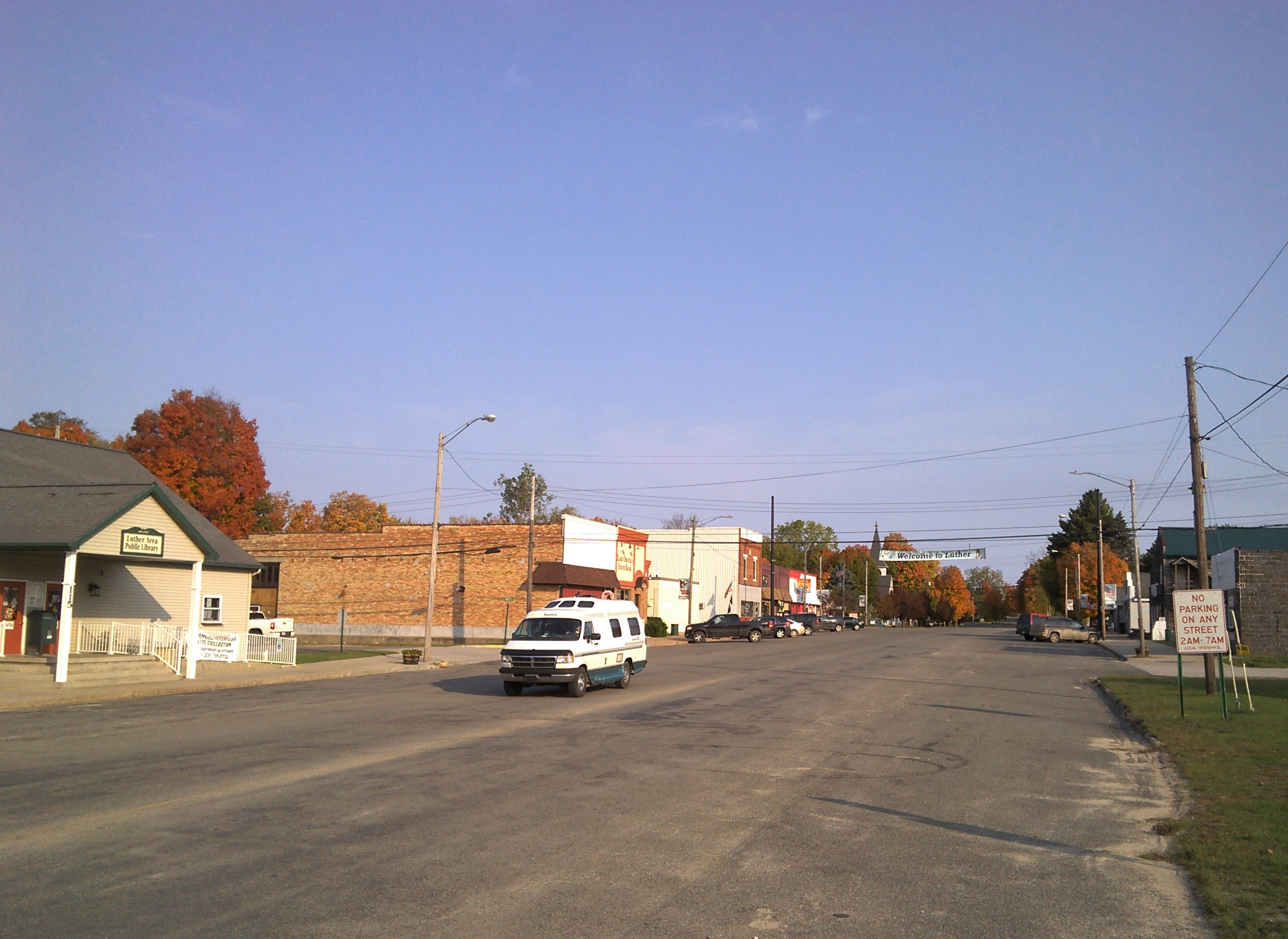
- Looking north along State Street

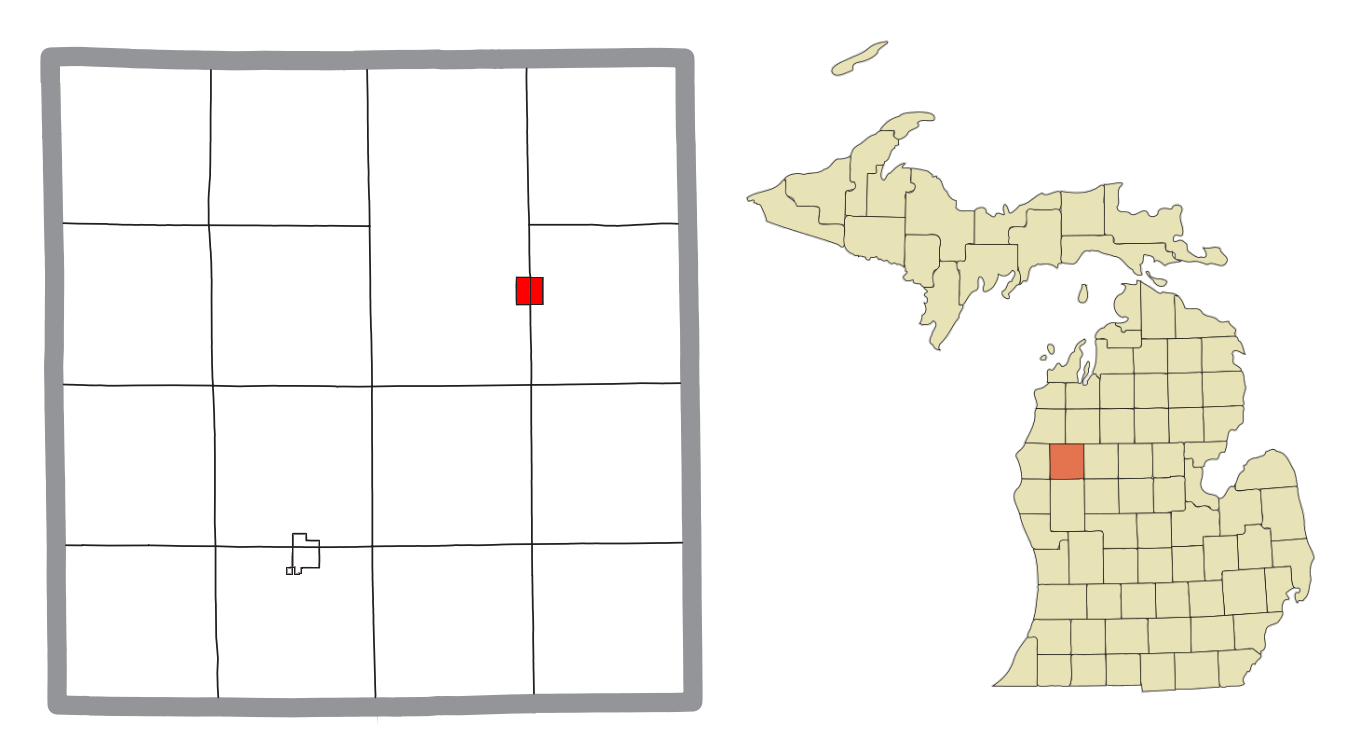
- Location within Lake County

- Location within the state of Michigan Location within the United States
- Coordinates: 44°02′22″N 85°41′04″W
- Country: United States
- State: Michigan
- County: Lake
- Townships: Ellsworth and Newkirk
- Settled: 1880
- Incorporated: 1893

Government
  - Type: Village council
  - President: Andy Treiber
  - Clerk: Carrie Fansler
  - Treasurer: Amy Jo DeJesus

Area
  - Total: 0.98 sq mi (2.55 km^{2})
  - Land: 0.97 sq mi (2.52 km^{2})
  - Water: 0.012 sq mi (0.03 km^{2})
- Elevation: 1,053 ft (321 m)

Population (2020)
  - Total: 332
  - Density: 342.27/sq mi (132.15/km^{2})
- Time zone: UTC-5 (Eastern (EST))
  - Summer (DST): UTC-4 (EDT)
- ZIP code(s): 49656
- Area code: 231
- FIPS code: 26-49740
- GNIS feature ID: 1620648
- Website: Official website

Luther is a village in Lake County in the U.S. state of Michigan. The population was 332 at the 2020 census. The village is almost evenly split between Newkirk Township on the west and Ellsworth Township on the east. Hillsdale College operates the G. H. Gordon Biological Research Station in Luther.

== History ==
The village was named for William A. Luther, a pioneer settler.

Lynx Nextwork Group, as part of the REACH-3MC project, has run its fiber optics network through the village of Luther providing dedicated private line transport, dedicated internet access, colocation/cloud services, voice services and SIP trunking, and Ethernet services.

== Geography ==
According to the United States Census Bureau, the village has a total area of 0.93 square miles (2.41 km^{2}), of which 0.92 square miles (2.38 km^{2}) is land and 0.01 square miles (0.03 km^{2}) is water.

== Demographics ==
Historical population
Census	Pop.	Note	%±
1890	1,084		—
1900	837		−22.8%
1910	626		−25.2%
1920	396		−36.7%
1930	337		−14.9%
1940	343		1.8%
1950	314		−8.5%
1960	325		3.5%
1970	320		−1.5%
1980	414		29.4%
1990	343		−17.1%
2000	339		−1.2%
2010	318		−6.2%
2020	332		4.4%
U.S. Decennial Census

=== 2010 census ===
As of the census of 2010, there were 318 people, 137 households, and 84 families residing in the village. The population density was 345.7 inhabitants per square mile (133.5/km^{2}). There were 190 housing units at an average density of 206.5 per square mile (79.7/km^{2}). The racial makeup of the village was 95.9% White, 0.3% African American, 1.9% Native American, and 1.9% from two or more races. Hispanic or Latino of any race were 2.8% of the population.

There were 137 households, of which 25.5% had children under the age of 18 living with them, 43.8% were married couples living together, 12.4% had a female householder with no husband present, 5.1% had a male householder with no wife present, and 38.7% were non-families. 34.3% of all households were made up of individuals, and 17.5% had someone living alone who was 65 years of age or older. The average household size was 2.32 and the average family size was 2.99.

The median age in the village was 40.8 years. 24.5% of residents were under the age of 18; 7.5% were between the ages of 18 and 24; 22.4% were from 25 to 44; 27.3% were from 45 to 64; and 18.2% were 65 years of age or older. The gender makeup of the village was 48.4% male and 51.6% female.

=== 2000 census ===
As of the census of 2000, there were 339 people, 133 households, and 88 families residing in the village. The population density was 364.8 inhabitants per square mile (140.9/km^{2}). There were 186 housing units at an average density of 200.2 per square mile (77.3/km^{2}). The racial makeup of the village was 91.74% White, 0.59% African American, 4.13% Native American, 0.29% Asian, 0.29% from other races, and 2.95% from two or more races. Hispanic or Latino of any race were 3.24% of the population.

There were 133 households, out of which 27.1% had children under the age of 18 living with them, 50.4% were married couples living together, 13.5% had a female householder with no husband present, and 33.1% were non-families. 28.6% of all households were made up of individuals, and 12.8% had someone living alone who was 65 years of age or older. The average household size was 2.50 and the average family size was 2.99.

In the village, the population was spread out, with 26.0% under the age of 18, 7.1% from 18 to 24, 24.5% from 25 to 44, 21.5% from 45 to 64, and 20.9% who were 65 years of age or older. The median age was 40 years. For every 100 females, there were 101.8 males. For every 100 females age 18 and over, there were 102.4 males.

The median income for a household in the village was $24,583, and the median income for a family was $26,250. Males had a median income of $23,889 versus $18,750 for females. The per capita income for the village was $10,715. About 16.2% of families and 22.2% of the population were below the poverty line, including 33.7% of those under age 18 and 10.8% of those age 65 or over.
