= 1933 Western State Teachers Hilltoppers football team =

American college football season

1933 Western State Teachers Hilltoppers football
- Conference: Independent
- Record: 3–3–1
- Head coach: Mike Gary (5th season)
- Captain: Maurice Tingstad

1933 Midwestern college football independents records
	Conf.			Overall
Team	W	L	T	W		L		T
DePaul		–		6	–	0	–	1
Detroit		–		7	–	1	–	0
Michigan State Normal		–		5	–	2	–	0
Saint Louis		–		6	–	3	–	0
Central State (MI)		–		5	–	2	–	1
Michigan State		–		4	–	2	–	2
Missouri Mines		–		4	–	3	–	0
Michigan Tech		–		2	–	2	–	0
Western State Teachers		–		3	–	3	–	1
Marquette		–		3	–	4	–	1
Notre Dame		–		3	–	5	–	1
Haskell		–		2	–	6	–	3
Detroit City		–		2	–	5	–	1

The 1933 Western State Teachers Hilltoppers football team represented Western State Teachers College (later renamed Western Michigan University) as an independent during the 1933 college football season. In their fifth season under head coach Mike Gary, the Hilltoppers compiled a 3–3–1 record and outscored their opponents, 66 to 64. Center Maurice Tingstad was the team captain.

== Schedule ==
Date	Opponent	Site	Result	Attendance	Source
September 30	North Central	Western State Teachers College Field; Kalamazoo, MI	L 0–7		
October 6	at Detroit	University of Detroit Stadium; Detroit, MI	L 0–26	17,000	
October 14	at Iowa State Teachers	Cedar Rapids, IA	W 8–6		
October 21	Carroll (WI)	Western State Teachers College Field; Kalamazoo, MI	T 0–0		
October 28	DePaul	Western State Teachers College Field; Kalamazoo, MI	L 6–25		
November 4	at Central State (MI)	Alumni Field; Mount Pleasant, MI (rivalry)	W 13–0		
November 11	St. Viator	Western State Teachers College Field; Kalamazoo, MI	W 33–0		
