= Robert A. Campbell (mayor) =

American politician (1865–1947)

Mayor of Ann Arbor
- In office 1933–1937
- Preceded by: H. Wirt Newkirk
- Succeeded by: Walter C. Sadler
- In office 1925–1927
- Preceded by: George E. Lewis
- Succeeded by: Edward W. Staebler

Personal details
- Born: July 2, 1865; Toronto, Canada West
- Died: November 6, 1947 (aged 82); Ann Arbor, Michigan, US
- Political party: Republican
- Spouse: Maria S. Holmes

Robert A. Campbell (July 2, 1865 – November 6, 1947) was an American politician.

== Career ==
Campbell was appointed to the position of Treasurer of the University of Michigan by the Board of Regents of the University of Michigan on June 27, 1911. He served in this position until 1931. From 1925 to 1927, Campbell served as the mayor of Ann Arbor, Michigan. Campbell was defeated in an election in 1927. Campbell returned as mayor from 1933 to 1937.
