= 1933 Tampa Spartans football team =

American college football season

1933 Tampa Spartans football
- Conference: Independent
- Record: 6–2–2
- Head coach: Nash Higgins (1st season)
- Home stadium: Plant Field

1933 Southern college football independents records
	Conf.			Overall
Team	W	L	T	W		L		T
Oklahoma City		–		8	–	1	–	0
Tulsa		–		6	–	1	–	0
Troy State		–		5	–	1	–	0
Tennessee State		–		4	–	1	–	0
Tampa		–		6	–	2	–	2
Texas A&I		–		6	–	2	–	0
Catholic University		–		6	–	3	–	0
South Georgia Teachers		–		5	–	3	–	0
Western Maryland		–		5	–	3	–	0
William & Mary Norfolk		–		5	–	3	–	1
George Washington		–		5	–	3	–	1
Navy		–		5	–	4	–	0
Oglethorpe		–		4	–	5	–	0
Texas Mines		–		3	–	5	–	1
West Virginia		–		3	–	5	–	2
Delaware		–		2	–	4	–	2
Dixie (TX)		–		2	–	4	–	0
Georgetown		–		1	–	6	–	1
Jacksonville State		–		1	–	4	–	1
East Carolina		–		1	–	5	–	0
Wake Forest		–		0	–	5	–	1

The 1933 Tampa Spartans football team represented the University of Tampa as an independent during the 1933 college football season. Led by Nash Higgins in his first season as head coach, the Spartans compiled an overall record of 6–2–2. The team played home games at Plant Field in Tampa, Florida.

== Schedule ==
Date	Time	Opponent	Site	Result	Attendance	Source
October 12		vs. Bowdon College	LaGrange, GA	W 28–0	2,000	
October 27		Southern College (FL)	Plant Field; Tampa, FL	W 21–0		
November 4		South Georgia	Plant Field; Tampa, FL	W 13–0		
November 11		Auburn freshmen	Plant Field; Tampa, FL	L 6–18		
November 17		Oglethorpe freshmen	Plant Field; Tampa, FL	W 12–0		
November 25		Stetson	Plant Field; Tampa, FL	W 8–0		
November 29		at Rollins	Tinker Field; Orlando, FL	L 7–19		
December 9	4:00 p.m.	Howard (AL)	Plant Field; Tampa, FL	T 6–6		
December 15		at Miami (FL)	Moore Park; Miami, FL	T 0–0		
December 25		Haskell	Plant Field; Tampa, FL	W 7–0	5,000	
All times are in Eastern time
