= 1933 Davidson Wildcats football team =

American college football season

1933 Davidson Wildcats football
- Conference: Independent
- Record: 6–2–1
- Head coach: Williams Newton (2nd season)
- Home stadium: Richardson Field

1933 Southern college football independents records
	Conf.			Overall
Team	W	L	T	W		L		T
Oklahoma City		–		8	–	1	–	0
Tulsa		–		6	–	1	–	0
Troy State		–		5	–	1	–	0
Texas A&I		–		6	–	2	–	0
Catholic University		–		6	–	3	–	0
South Georgia Teachers		–		5	–	3	–	0
Western Maryland		–		5	–	3	–	0
William & Mary Norfolk		–		5	–	3	–	1
George Washington		–		5	–	3	–	1
Navy		–		5	–	4	–	0
Oglethorpe		–		4	–	5	–	0
Texas Mines		–		3	–	5	–	1
West Virginia		–		3	–	5	–	2
Delaware		–		2	–	4	–	2
Dixie (TX)		–		2	–	4	–	0
Georgetown		–		1	–	6	–	1
Jacksonville State		–		1	–	4	–	1
East Carolina		–		1	–	5	–	0
Wake Forest		–		0	–	5	–	1

The 1933 Davidson Wildcats football team was an American football team that represented Davidson College as an independent during the 1933 college football season. In their second year under head coach Williams Newton, the team compiled a 6–2–1 record.

== Schedule ==
Date	Opponent	Site	Result	Attendance	Source
September 23	Elon	Richardson Field; Davidson, NC	W 6–0		
September 30	at North Carolina	Kenan Memorial Stadium; Chapel Hill, NC	L 0–6		
October 7	at Wofford	Snyder Field; Spartanburg, SC	W 28–13		
October 14	VMI	Richardson Field; Davidson, NC	W 6–0	2,500	
October 21	Duke	Richardson Field; Davidson, NC	L 7–19		
October 28	at NC State	Riddick Stadium; Raleigh, NC	T 6–6		
November 11	The Citadel	Richardson Field; Davidson, NC	W 24–6	4,500	
November 18	at William & Mary	Cary Field; Williamsburg, VA	W 12–7	3,000	
November 30	vs. Wake Forest	Central High School Stadium; Charlotte, NC	W 20–13	10,000	
