= 1933 Tennessee State Tigers football team =

American college football season

1933 Tennessee State Tigers football
- Conference: Independent
- Record: 4–1
- Head coach: Walter S. Davis (1st season)
- Home stadium: State College field

1933 Southern college football independents records
	Conf.			Overall
Team	W	L	T	W		L		T
Oklahoma City		–		8	–	1	–	0
Tulsa		–		6	–	1	–	0
Troy State		–		5	–	1	–	0
Tennessee State		–		4	–	1	–	0
Texas A&I		–		6	–	2	–	0
Catholic University		–		6	–	3	–	0
South Georgia Teachers		–		5	–	3	–	0
Western Maryland		–		5	–	3	–	0
William & Mary Norfolk		–		5	–	3	–	1
George Washington		–		5	–	3	–	1
Navy		–		5	–	4	–	0
Oglethorpe		–		4	–	5	–	0
Texas Mines		–		3	–	5	–	1
West Virginia		–		3	–	5	–	2
Delaware		–		2	–	4	–	2
Dixie (TX)		–		2	–	4	–	0
Georgetown		–		1	–	6	–	1
Jacksonville State		–		1	–	4	–	1
East Carolina		–		1	–	5	–	0
Wake Forest		–		0	–	5	–	1

The 1933 Tennessee State Tigers football team represented Tennessee Agricultural & Industrial State College—now known as Tennessee State University—as an independent during the 1933 college football season. Led by first-year head coach Walter S. Davis, the Tigers compiled a record of 4–1. Davis was assisted by T. D. Upshaw and Boswell.

== Schedule ==
Date	Time	Opponent	Site	Result	Attendance	Source
October 21		Miles	Nashville, TN	W 8–0		
October 27		at Alabama A&M	Normal field; Normal, AL	L 0–25		
November 4		West Kentucky Industrial		W 58–0		
November 18	2:00 p.m.	Louisville Municipal	State College field; Nashville, TN	W 18–0		
November 30		Lane	Nashville, TN	W 37–0	2,500	
All times are in Central time
