= 1933 Washington and Lee Generals football team =

American college football season

1933 Washington and Lee Generals football
- Conference: Southern Conference
- Record: 4–4–2 (1–1–1 SoCon)
- Head coach: Warren E. Tilson (1st season)
- Home stadium: Wilson Field

1933 Southern Conference football standings
	Conf.					Overall
Team	W		L		T	W		L		T
Duke +	4	–	0	–	0	9	–	1	–	0
South Carolina +	3	–	0	–	0	6	–	3	–	1
North Carolina	2	–	1	–	0	4	–	5	–	0
VMI	2	–	1	–	1	2	–	7	–	1
Washington and Lee	1	–	1	–	1	4	–	4	–	2
Clemson	1	–	1	–	0	3	–	6	–	2
VPI	1	–	1	–	3	4	–	3	–	3
Virginia	1	–	3	–	1	2	–	6	–	2
Maryland	1	–	4	–	0	3	–	7	–	0
NC State	0	–	4	–	0	1	–	5	–	3
+ – Conference co-champions

The 1933 Washington and Lee Generals football team was an American football team that represented Washington and Lee University during the 1933 college football season as a member of the Southern Conference. In their first year under head coach Warren E. Tilson, the team compiled an overall record of 4–4–2, with a mark of 1–1–1 in conference play.

== Schedule ==
Date	Time	Opponent	Site	Result	Attendance	Source
September 23		vs. West Virginia*	Laidley Field; Charleston, WV	T 0–0		
September 30		Roanoke*	Wilson Field; Lexington, VA	W 14–6		
October 7		William & Mary*	Wilson Field; Lexington, VA	W 7–0		
October 14		at Yale*	Yale Bowl; New Haven, CT	L 0–14	18,000	
October 21		vs. Kentucky*	Maher Field; Roanoke, VA	W 7–0		
October 28		at Princeton*	Palmer Stadium; Princeton, NJ	L 0–6		
November 4		at VPI	Miles Stadium; Blacksburg, VA	T 7–7		
November 11		Virginia	Wilson Field; Lexington, VA	W 6–0		
November 18	3:00 p.m.	at Centre*	Cheek Field; Danville, KY	L 0–12	8,000	
November 25		at Maryland	Byrd Stadium; College Park, MD	L 13–33		
*Non-conference game; All times are in Eastern time
