= Williams Newton =

- Newton pictured in The Agromeck 1938, NC State yearbook

Biographical details
- Born: September 25, 1893; Thomasville, North Carolina, U.S.
- Died: June 20, 1970 (aged 76); Raleigh, North Carolina, U.S.

Coaching career (HC unless noted)

Football
- 1925–1927: Howard (AL) (assistant)
- 1928: Birmingham–Southern (freshmen)
- 1929–1930: Howard (AL) (line)
- 1931: Tennessee (assistant)
- 1932–1935: Davidson
- 1937–1943: NC State
- 1944: South Carolina
- 1945–1948: Guilford

Baseball
- 1926–1927: Howard (AL)
- 1929: Birmingham–Southern
- 1930–1931: Howard (AL)
- 1940–1944: NC State

Head coaching record
- Overall: 59–77–14 (football)

Solomon Williams "Doc" Newton (September 25, 1893 – June 20, 1970) was a minor league baseball player as well as an American football and baseball coach. He served as the head football coach at Davidson College (1932–1935), North Carolina State University (1937–1943), the University of South Carolina (1944), and Guilford College (1945–1948), compiling a career college football record of 59–77–14. Newton was also the head baseball coach at Howard College, now Samford University in 1926 and 1930 and at North Carolina State from 1940 to 1944, tallying a career college baseball mark of 29–67–2.

== History ==
Newton was born in North Carolina on September 25, 1893. He was the son of Reverend J.D. Newton and Martha Mills (whose father John Haymes Mills founded the first orphanage in the state of North Carolina). Newton married Jean Lightfoot of Fayetteville, North Carolina.

His brother Adrian Jefferson Newton was the Clerk of the North Carolina Supreme Court for 35 years (from October 15, 1941 – December 1, 1976).

== Baseball playing career ==
His sports career began as a minor league baseball player. His minor league baseball career spanned from 1916 to 1928. Playing for a number of teams, the most prestigious was the Baltimore Orioles AA team in the International League.

== Baseball coaching career ==
Newton was a baseball coach of Gastonia American Legion Post 23 baseball’s program. His tenure with the team was successful as they had a 140-50 record. In 1935, he coached the team to win the National American Legion Championship. He was eventually inducted into the American Legion Baseball Hall of Fame.

In addition, he coached baseball at Howard College (now Samford) in 1926 and 1930, at Davidson College, and at North Carolina State from 1940 to 1944.

== Football coaching career ==
In 1931, he was on the coaching staff at the University of Tennessee.

Newton coached football at Davidson from 1932 to 1935 and compiled an 18–13–5 record.

From 1937 to 1945, he coached at North Carolina State, where he compiled a 24–39–6 record. Recruitment became difficult during at least part of his tenure as Head Coach due to the fact that World War II necessitated that eligible males over 18 be inducted into the U.S. military. In addition, the Army did not allow Army officer trainees studying at N.C. State to play on the football team.

While at North Carolina State, Newton started a fundraising club called "The Doc Newton Club." It is currently known as the "Wolfpack Club."

In 1944, he coached at South Carolina and compiled a 3–4–2 record.

== Head coaching record ==
=== Football ===
Year	Team	Overall	Conference	Standing	Bowl/playoffs
Davidson Wildcats (Big Five Conference) (1932–1935)
1932	Davidson	4–4–1			
1933	Davidson	6–2–1			
1934	Davidson	4–4–1			
1935	Davidson	4–3–2			
Davidson:		18–13–5			
NC State Wolfpack (Southern Conference) (1937–1943)
1937	NC State	5–3–1	4–2–1	6th	
1938	NC State	3–7–1	3–3–1	T–6th	
1939	NC State	2–8	2–4	T–9th	
1940	NC State	3–6	3–5	11th	
1941	NC State	4–5–2	3–4–2	8th	
1942	NC State	4–4–2	3–1–2	6th	
1943	NC State	3–6	1–4	9th	
NC State:		24–39–6	19–24–6		
South Carolina Gamecocks (Southern Conference) (1944)
1944	South Carolina	3–4–2	1–3	7th	
South Carolina:		3–4–2	1–3		
Guilford Quakers (North State Conference) (1945–1948)
1945	Guilford	0–7	0–3	5th	
1946	Guilford	6–2–1	1–2–1	T–5th	
1947	Guilford	4–6	2–3	T–5th	
1948	Guilford	4–6	1–5	7th	
Guilford:		14–21–1	4–13–1		
Total:		59–77–14			

== Ancestry ==
Ancestors of Williams Newton

8. Isaac Newton
4. Isaac Newton
18. David Alderman
9. Elizabeth Alderman
19. Jemima Hall
2. J.D. Newton
20. William Johnson
10. Nathan Johnson
21. Jannie Register
5. Theresa Johnson
11. Keziah Jane Jones
1. Solomon Williams Newton
24. Robert S. Mills
12. John Garland Mills
25. Mary Barbara Sharp
6. John Haymes Mills
26. John Haymes
13. Martha Walker Haymes
27. Martha Walker
3. Martha Mills
28. Henry Guston Williams Sr.
14. Henry G. Williams
29. Lucy Tunstall
7. Elizabeth Ann Arrington Williams Mills
30. John Arrington
15. Elizabeth Arrington
31. Elizabeth Nicholson
