= 1933 Duke Blue Devils football team =

American college football season

1933 Duke Blue Devils football

SoCon co-champion
- Conference: Southern Conference
- Record: 9–1 (4–0 SoCon)
- Head coach: Wallace Wade (3rd season)
- Offensive scheme: Single-wing
- MVP: Fred Crawford
- Captain: Carl Schock

1933 Southern Conference football standings
	Conf.					Overall
Team	W		L		T	W		L		T
Duke +	4	–	0	–	0	9	–	1	–	0
South Carolina +	3	–	0	–	0	6	–	3	–	1
North Carolina	2	–	1	–	0	4	–	5	–	0
VMI	2	–	1	–	1	2	–	7	–	1
Washington and Lee	1	–	1	–	1	4	–	4	–	2
Clemson	1	–	1	–	0	3	–	6	–	2
VPI	1	–	1	–	3	4	–	3	–	3
Virginia	1	–	3	–	1	2	–	6	–	2
Maryland	1	–	4	–	0	3	–	7	–	0
NC State	0	–	4	–	0	1	–	5	–	3
+ – Conference co-champions

The 1933 Duke Blue Devils football team represented the Duke Blue Devils of Duke University during the 1933 college football season. Hall of Famer Fred Crawford was a consensus All-American this year; the first from North Carolina.

Duke upset Robert Neyland's Tennessee Volunteers 10 to 2. It was Tennessee's first loss in over two and a half seasons. It caused Neyland to say of Crawford: "He gave the finest exhibition of tackle play I have ever seen."

This was also the first season in which Duke played longtime rival Georgia Tech, the teams would go on to meet on the football field every year uninterrupted until 2023.

== Schedule ==
Date	Opponent	Site	Result	Attendance	Source
September 30	vs. VMI	World War Memorial Stadium; Greensboro, NC	W 37–6	10,000	
October 7	Wake Forest*	Duke Stadium; Durham, NC (rivalry)	W 22–0	8,000	
October 14	Tennessee*^{†}	Duke Stadium; Durham, NC	W 10–2	22,000	
October 21	at Davidson*	Richardson Field; Davidson, NC	W 19–7		
October 28	at Kentucky*	Stoll Field; Lexington, KY	W 14–7	15,000	
November 4	Auburn*	Duke Stadium; Durham, NC	W 13–7		
November 11	Maryland	Byrd Stadium; College Park, MD	W 38–7	10,000	
November 18	North Carolina	Duke Stadium; Durham, NC (rivalry)	W 21–0	32,000	
November 25	NC State	Duke Stadium; Durham, NC (rivalry)	W 7–0	10,000	
December 2	at Georgia Tech*	Grant Field; Atlanta, GA	L 0–6	16,000	
*Non-conference game; ^{†}Homecoming
