= 1933 Richmond Spiders football team =

American college football season

1933 Richmond Spiders football

Virginia Conference co-champion
- Conference: Virginia Conference
- Record: 5–4 (2–1 Virginia)
- Head coach: Frank Dobson (20th season)
- Captain: George G. Hope
- Home stadium: City Stadium

1933 Virginia Conference football standings
	Conf.					Overall
Team	W		L		T	W		L		T
Emory and Henry +	2	–	1	–	0	10	–	1	–	0
Richmond +	2	–	1	–	0	5	–	4	–	0
William & Mary +	2	–	1	–	0	6	–	5	–	0
Roanoke	0	–	3	–	0	4	–	5	–	0
+ – Conference co-champions

The 1933 Richmond Spiders football team was an American football team that represented the University of Richmond as a member of the Virginia Conference during the 1933 college football season. In their 20th season under head coach Frank Dobson, Richmond compiled a 5–4 record and finished as Virginia co-champion.

== Schedule ==
Date	Opponent	Site	Result	Attendance	Source
September 30	Furman*	City Stadium; Richmond, VA	L 6–14	3,000	
October 7	at Cornell*	Schoellkopf Field; Ithaca, NY	L 7–28		
October 21	VPI*	City Stadium; Richmond, VA	L 0–7		
October 28	Randolph–Macon*	City Stadium; Richmond, VA	W 27–0		
November 4	Roanoke	City Stadium; Richmond, VA	W 19–0		
November 11	Hampden–Sydney	City Stadium; Richmond, VA	W 13–0		
November 18	VMI*	City Stadium; Richmond, VA (rivalry)	W 15–0		
November 30	William & Mary	City Stadium; Richmond, VA (rivalry)	L 0–6	14,000	
*Non-conference game
