= 1933 South Dakota Coyotes football team =

American college football season

1933 South Dakota Coyotes football
- Conference: North Central Conference
- Record: 5–6 (1–3 NCC)
- Head coach: Stanley G. Backman (3rd season)
- Home stadium: Inman Field

1933 North Central Conference football standings
	Conf.					Overall
Team	W		L		T	W		L		T
South Dakota State $	4	–	0	–	0	6	–	3	–	0
North Dakota Agricultural	2	–	1	–	1	3	–	2	–	4
North Dakota	1	–	2	–	1	3	–	5	–	1
Morningside	1	–	3	–	0	4	–	4	–	0
South Dakota	1	–	3	–	0	5	–	6	–	0
$ – Conference champion

The 1933 South Dakota Coyotes football team was an American football team that represented the University of South Dakota in the North Central Conference (NCC) during the 1933 college football season. In its third and final season under head coach Stanley G. Backman, the team compiled a 5–6 record (1–3 against NCC opponents), tied for last place in the NCC, and was outscored by a total of 123 to 65. The team played its home games at Inman Field in Vermillion, South Dakota.

== Schedule ==
Date	Opponent	Site	Result	Source
September 23	Yankton*	Inman Field; Vermillion, SD	W 20–0	
September 30	York*	Inman Field; Vermillion, SD	W 19–0	
October 7	at Cincinnati	Nippert Stadium; Cincinnati, OH	L 0–14	
October 13	at North Dakota	Grand Forks, ND	L 0–41	
October 21	at Morningside	Sioux City, IA	W 13–7	
October 28	South Dakota State	Inman Field; Vermillion, SD	L 0–14	
November 4	at DePaul	Wrigley Field; Chicago, IL	L 0–20	
November 11	North Dakota Agricultural	Inman Field; Vermillion, SD	L 0–14	
November 18	vs. South Dakota State	Sioux Falls, SD	W 6–0	
November 25	at Illinois College	Jacksonville, IL	W 7–0	
November 30	at Illinois Wesleyan	Bloomington, IL	L 0–13	
*Non-conference game
