= 1933 VPI Gobblers football team =

American college football season

1933 VPI Gobblers football
- Conference: Southern Conference
- Record: 4–3–3 (1–1–3 SoCon)
- Head coach: Henry Redd (2nd season)
- Captain: William Breckenridge Porterfield
- Home stadium: Miles Stadium

1933 Southern Conference football standings
	Conf.					Overall
Team	W		L		T	W		L		T
Duke +	4	–	0	–	0	9	–	1	–	0
South Carolina +	3	–	0	–	0	6	–	3	–	1
North Carolina	2	–	1	–	0	4	–	5	–	0
VMI	2	–	1	–	1	2	–	7	–	1
Washington and Lee	1	–	1	–	1	4	–	4	–	2
Clemson	1	–	1	–	0	3	–	6	–	2
VPI	1	–	1	–	3	4	–	3	–	3
Virginia	1	–	3	–	1	2	–	6	–	2
Maryland	1	–	4	–	0	3	–	7	–	0
NC State	0	–	4	–	0	1	–	5	–	3
+ – Conference co-champions

The 1933 VPI Gobblers football team represented Virginia Agricultural and Mechanical College and Polytechnic Institute, now known as Virginia Tech the 1933 college football season. The team was led by their head coach Henry Redd and finished with a record of four wins, three losses and three ties (4–3–3).

== Schedule ==
Date	Time	Opponent	Site	Result	Attendance	Source
September 23		Roanoke*	Miles Stadium; Blacksburg, VA	W 7–0		
September 30		at Tennessee*	Shields–Watkins Field; Knoxville, TN	L 0–27	15,000	
October 7		vs. Maryland	Bain Field; Norfolk, VA	W 14–0	4,000	
October 14		vs. William & Mary*	City Stadium; Richmond, VA	W 13–7	9,000	
October 21	3:00 p.m.	at Richmond*	City Stadium; Richmond, VA	W 7–0		
October 28		South Carolina	Miles Stadium; Blacksburg, VA	L 0–12	10,000	
November 4		Washington and Lee^{†}	Miles Stadium; Blacksburg, VA	T 7–7	3,500	
November 11		at Alabama*	Denny Stadium; Tuscaloosa, AL	L 0–27	10,000	
November 18		at Virginia	Scott Stadium; Charlottesville, VA (rivalry)	T 6–6	5,000	
November 30		vs. VMI	Maher Field; Roanoke, VA (rivalry)	T 0–0	11,000-13,000	
*Non-conference game; ^{†}Homecoming; All times are in Eastern time

== Before the season ==
The 1932 VPI Gobblers football team compiled a 8–1 record and were led by Henry Redd in his first season as head coach.

== Game summaries ==
=== Roanoke ===
Roanoke vs. VPI

Team	1	2	3	4	Total
Roanoke	0	0	0	0	0
• VPI	0	7	0	0	7

- Date: September 23, 1933
- Location: Miles Stadium
  Blacksburg, VA
- Referee: Parrish (VPI)

VPI's first game of the season was a victory over Roanoke at Miles Stadium.

The starting lineup for VPI was: Negri (left end), Copenhaver (left tackle), English (left guard), Porterfield (center), Murphy (right guard), Hoenstine (right tackle), McIntire (right end), Holsclaw (quarterback), Casey (left halfback), Smith (right halfback), Robison (fullback). The substitutes were: Cunningham, Huffman, Lindsay, Morgan, Ochs, Simmons, Smith, Stevens and Stump.

The starting lineup for Roanoke was: Lex Holyfield (left end), Gene Barnett (left tackle), Earl Fisher (left guard), Norman Wermick (center), Lawrence Fisher (right guard), Harry Suttner (right tackle), Charles Engers (right end), Charles Patrone (quarterback), Ward Akers (left halfback), Harrison Weeks (right halfback), Bud Miley (fullback). The substitutes were: Roy Ringstaff and Thomas West.

=== Tennessee ===
VPI at Tennessee

Team	1	2	3	4	Total
VPI	0	0	0	0	0
• Tennessee	7	13	7	0	27

- Date: September 30, 1933
- Location: Shields–Watkins Field
  Knoxville, TN
- Game attendance: 15,000
- Game weather: "sun-scorched"
- Referee: Everett Strupper

After their victory over Roanoke, VPI played the University of Tennessee at Shields–Watkins Field in Knoxville, Tennessee.

The starting lineup for VPI was: Negri (left end), Hoenstine (left tackle), Murphy (left guard), Portfield (center), English (right guard), Copenhaver (right tackle), McIntire (right end), Morgan (quarterback), Mills (left halfback), Casey (right halfback), Smith (fullback).

The starting lineup for Tennessee was: Al Mark (left end), Milton Frank (left tackle), Howard Stewart (left guard), Talmadge Maples (center), J. B. Ellis (right guard), Howard Bailey (right tackle), Murray Warmath (right end), Deke Brackett (quarterback), Leo Petruzze (left halfback), Beattie Feathers (right halfback), Herman Wynn (fullback). The substitutes were: Richard Dorsey, Fred Moses, Edwin Palmer and Spruill.

=== Maryland ===
Maryland vs. VPI

Team	1	2	3	4	Total
Maryland	0	0	0	0	0
• VPI	0	0	7	7	14

- Date: October 7, 1933
- Location: Bain Field
  Norfolk, VA
- Game attendance: 4,000
- Referee: Paul Magoffin

The starting lineup for VPI was: Thomas (left end), Negri (left tackle), Murray (left guard), Porterfield (center), English (right guard), Huffman (right tackle), McIntire (right end), Morgan (quarterback), Casey (left halfback), Holsclaw (right halfback), Smith (fullback). The substitutes were: Hoenstine, Howard, Lindsay, Mills, Ochs, Ottaway and Stump.

The starting lineup for Maryland was: Louis Ennis (left end), Tom McLaughlin (left tackle), Walter Bradley (left guard), Thomas Webb (center), John Simpson (right guard), Charles Callahan (right tackle), Carl Stalfort (right end), Dick Nelson (quarterback), Charles Yaeger (left halfback), Earl Widmyer (right halfback), George Sachs (fullback). The substitutes were: Willis Benner, Joseph Coulehan, Joseph Crecca, William Garrott, Luther Goldman, John Mayhew and Robert Snyder.

=== William & Mary ===
William & Mary vs. VPI

Team	1	2	3	4	Total
W&M	0	0	0	7	7
• VPI	6	7	0	0	13

- Date: October 14, 1933
- Location: City Stadium
  Richmond, VA
- Game attendance: 9,000
- Referee: Paul Magoffin

The starting lineup for VPI was: Thomas (left end), Negri (left tackle), Murphy (left guard), Porterfield (center), English (right guard), Hoenstine (right tackle), McIntire (right end), Morgan (quarterback), Casey (left halfback), Holsclaw (right halfback), Smith (fullback). The substitutes were: Andrews, Copenhaver, Howard, Huffman, Lindsay, Ochs, Robison, Simmons, Spruill and Tyler.

The starting lineup for William & Mary was: Murray (left end), Waddy Stewart (left tackle), Ned LeGrande (left guard), Joseph Bridgers (center), I. Upson (right guard), Gerald Quirk (right tackle), Felix Troyano (right end), Bill Chalko (quarterback), William Yerkes (left halfback), Melville Bryant (right halfback), David Young (fullback). The substitutes were: C. Franklin, Bob Henderson, Junie Smith, C. Sorenson, Harry Spack and Dale Worrall.

=== Richmond ===
VPI at Richmond

Team	1	2	3	4	Total
• VPI	0	0	7	0	7
Richmond	0	0	0	0	0

- Date: October 21, 1933
- Location: City Stadium
  Richmond, VA
- Game start: 3:00 p.m.
- Referee: Bagley (W&L)

The starting lineup for VPI was: Thomas (left end), Huffman (left tackle), Murphy (left guard), Copenhaver (center), English (right guard), Hoenstine (right tackle), Negri (right end), Morgan (quarterback), Casey (left halfback), Holsclaw (right halfback), Smith (fullback). The substitutes were: Mills.

The starting lineup for Richmond was: Homer Essex (left end), James Strong (left tackle), Diedrich (left guard), Claude Slaydon (center), Ural Humphries (right guard), George Lacy (right tackle), Tom Morris (right end), Jack Dobson (quarterback), Victor Chaltain (left halfback), Perry Schultz (right halfback), Bob Leverton (fullback).

=== South Carolina ===
South Carolina vs. VPI

Team	1	2	3	4	Total
• South Carolina	0	6	0	6	12
VPI	0	0	0	0	0

- Date: October 28, 1933
- Location: Miles Stadium
  Blacksburg, VA
- Game attendance: 10,000
- Referee: Boyd Chambers

The starting lineup for VPI was: Thomas (left end), Huffman (left tackle), Murphy (left guard), Copenhaver (center), English (right guard), Hoenstine (right tackle), Negri (right end), Morgan (quarterback), Casey (left halfback), Groth (right halfback), Smith (fullback). The substitutes were: Lindsay, Mills, Ochs, Reynolds, Robison, Simmons, Spruill, B. Stump and Tyler.

The starting lineup for South Carolina was: John Epps (left end), Joe Johnson (left tackle), Nelson Fortson (left guard), Joe Shinn (center), Buddy Morehead (right guard), Freeman Huskey (right tackle), Tom Craig (right end), Harold Mauney (quarterback), Fred Hambright (left halfback), Ed Clary (right halfback), Allie McDougall (fullback). The substitutes were: Wilburn Clary, Fred Craft, William McCrady, Henry McManus, Roy Stroud, Henry Willard, Wolfe and Walker Yonce.

=== Washington and Lee ===
Washington and Lee vs. VPI

Team	1	2	3	4	Total
W&L	0	7	0	0	7
VPI	7	0	0	0	7

- Date: November 4, 1933
- Location: Miles Stadium
  Blacksburg, VA
- Game attendance: 3,500
- Game weather: "cold drizzle"
- Referee: Richard Carrington (UVA)

VPI's 1933 homecoming game was a tie against Washington and Lee.

The starting lineup for VPI was: Thomas (left end), Huffman (left tackle), Murphy (left guard), Copenhaver (center), English (right guard), Hoenstine (right tackle), Negri (right end), Morgan (quarterback), Casey (left halfback), Mills (right halfback), Smith (fullback). The substitutes were: Groth, Lindsay, Ochs, Ottaway, Simmons and B. Stump.

The starting lineup for Washington and Lee was: Charles Smith (left end), Clarence Carman (left tackle), Thomasson Boland (left guard), George Glynn (center), Amos Bolen (right guard), William Dyer (right tackle), John Hanley (right end), William Seaton (quarterback), Joseph Sawyers (left halfback), Samuel Mattox (right halfback), Jack Bailey (fullback). The substitutes were: Joseph Arnold, Hugo Bonino, William Ellis, William Grove, J. Geiger Henthorne, Lewis Martin, Edward Seitz and Samuel Todd.

=== Alabama ===
VPI at Alabama

Team	1	2	3	4	Total
VPI	0	0	0	0	0
• Alabama	6	12	9	0	27

- Date: November 11, 1933
- Location: Denny Stadium
  Tuscaloosa, AL
- Game attendance: 10,000

Against the Crimson Tide of the University of Alabama, VPI lost 27-0 in front 10,000 spectators at Denny Stadium. Alabama took a 6–0 first quarter lead after Riley Smith scored on a five-yard touchdown run. They extended their lead to 18–0 at halftime on touchdown runs of one-yard by Joe Demyanovich and ten-yards by James Angelich in the second quarter. Alabama then closed the game with a 16-yard Dixie Howell touchdown run and a tackle of the Gobblers' Ray Mills for a safety in the third for the 27–0 win.

Alabama's assistant coach was former VPI player Hank Crisp.

The starting lineup for VPI was: Negri (left end), Huffman (left tackle), Murphy (left guard), Copenhaver (center), English (right guard), Hoenstine (right tackle), B. Stump (right end), Morgan (quarterback), Casey (left halfback), Mills (right halfback), Smith (fullback). The substitutes were: Andrews, Botnick, Cunningham, Howard, Lindsay, McIntire, Ottaway, Russell, Simmons and A. Stump.

The starting lineup for Alabama was: Thomas McMillian (left end), Jim Whatley (left tackle), Charles Marr (left guard), Joseph Dildy (center), Bob Ed Morrow (right guard), Arthur MacGahey (right tackle), Bear Bryant (right end), Tilden Campbell (quarterback), James McDanal (left halfback), Charles Stapp (right halfback), Riley Smith (fullback). The substitutes were: James Angelich, Ben Baswell, Angelo Danelutti, Joseph Demyanovich, James Dildy, Ralph Gandy, Raymond Glass, Dixie Howell, Larry Hughes, John Hundertmark, Thomas Hupke, Don Hutson, B'Ho Kirkland, Foy Leach, Bill Lee, Frank Moseley, Lee Rogers, Hilman Walker and Jimmy Walker.

=== Virginia ===
VPI at Virginia

Team	1	2	3	4	Total
VPI	0	0	0	6	6
UVA	0	6	0	0	6

- Date: November 18, 1933
- Location: Scott Stadium
  Charlottesville, VA
- Game attendance: 5,000
- Referee: Frank Lane

The starting lineup for VPI was: Thomas (left end), Huffman (left tackle), Murphy (left guard), Porterfield (center), English (right guard), Negri (right tackle), B. Stump (right end), Morgan (quarterback), Casey (left halfback), Robison (right halfback), Smith (fullback). The substitutes were: Copenhaver, Hoenstine, Lindsay, McIntire, Ochs and Ottaway.

The starting lineup for Virginia was: John Leys (left end), George Coles (left tackle), Horace Hallett (left guard), Gene Wager (center), John Dial (right guard), Ray Burger (right tackle), Kenneth Morton (right end), Thomas Johnson (quarterback), Gene Munger (left halfback), Bucky Harris (right halfback), Spencer Berger (fullback). The substitutes were: Milton Abramson, Blanton, Philip Fryberger, Elmer Purvis, Jesse Stocker and Cully Wilkin.

=== VMI ===
VMI vs. VPI

Team	1	2	3	4	Total
VMI	0	0	0	0	0
VPI	0	0	0	0	0

- Date: November 30, 1933
- Location: Maher Field
  Roanoke, VA
- Game attendance: 11,000-13,000
- Referee: Elberts (Catholic)

The starting lineup for VPI was: B. Stump (left end), Huffman (left tackle), Murphy (left guard), Copenhaver (center), English (right guard), Negri (right tackle), Thomas (right end), Morgan (quarterback), Casey (left halfback), Robison (right halfback), Smith (fullback). The substitutes were: Hoenstine, Holsclaw, Lindsay, McIntire, Ochs, Ottaway and A. Stump.

The starting lineup for VMI was: Phil Rutschow (left end), Samuel Lowe (left tackle), John Burgess (left guard), James Nimmo (center), Charles Straub (right guard), Russ Coleman (right tackle), Gil Minor (right end), Billy Smith (quarterback), Merideth Urick (left halfback), Tucker Watkins (right halfback), Dick Dodson (fullback). The substitutes were: Ed Law.

== After the season ==
In December 1933, the VPI players elected George Smith as captain of the 1934 VPI Gobblers football team.

== Players ==
=== Roster ===
VPI 1933 roster
Quarterbacks: Duncan Holsclaw; Charles Morgan; Guards: E. N. "Red" Andrews; Benjamin Botnick; Edward "Red" English; Ken "Hank" Lindsay; John Murphy; Norman Ochs; Tackles: G. W. Hoenstine; Harry Worden Howard; Richard "Tris" Huffman; Leon Dalmain Simmons	Centers: Jim Copenhaver; Bill Porterfield (Capt.); Ends: John McIntire; Warren "Red" Negri; Bob Stump; Dave Thomas; Halfbacks: Al Casey; Martin Cunningham; Ray Mills; James Edward Ottaway; Fullbacks: Carl Robison; Joseph Decatur Russell; George Smith	Substitutes: George Vanderslice Beamon; John Albert "Jack/Buck" Carpenter; E. W. "Ike" Cessna; J. L. "Nick" Dillon; Jack Elder; Charles Alexander "Heinie" Groth; Tom B. Hutcheson; Richard Whitmore Neale; A. Ernie Pritchard; Ted B. Pugh; H. Frank Rankin; Lawrence Samuel "Buck" Reynolds; H. A. "Rummy" Robinette; Henry G. Russa; Marvin Sifford; Howard Arnold "Hank" Spruill; Al Stevens; Arthur Everett Stump; Daniel Reiser Thoma; W. F. "Buck" Tyler; James VanDyck; Dick Wray; John Lester Yorke

=== Varsity letter winners ===
Eighteen players received varsity letters for their participation on the 1933 VPI team.

Player	Hometown	Notes
Alfred Layden Casey	Portsmouth, Virginia	
James Henry Copenhaver	Rural Retreat, Virginia	World War II veteran (Captain, Army).
Edward Ralph "Red" English	Altavista, Virginia	World War II veteran (Army).
Garland Woodrow Hoenstine	Altoona, Pennsylvania	
William Duncan Holsclaw	Charleston, West Virginia	
Roy Edward "Tris" Huffman	Culpeper, Virginia	
Kenneth Thomas "Hank" Lindsay	Cumberland, Maryland	
John A. McIntire	Moundsville, West Virginia	
Ray Mills	Keyser, West Virginia	
Charles Emmett Ashburn Morgan	South Norfolk, Virginia	
John Marshall Murphy	Knoxville, Tennessee	
Warren Anthony "Red" Negri	Danbury, Connecticut	
John Norman Ochs	Cincinnati, Ohio	World War II veteran.
William Breckenridge Porterfield (Capt.)	Glade Spring, Virginia	World War II veteran (Lieutenant Commander, Navy).
Carl Francis Robison	Watertown, New York	World War II veteran (Lieutenant Commander, Navy). Awarded the Navy Cross.
George Maxie Smith	Petersburg, Virginia	
Robert McClanahan Stump	Bristol, Tennessee	
David T. Thomas	Hyattsville, Maryland	

== Coaching and training staff ==
- Head coach: Henry Redd
- Assistant coaches
  - William L. Younger
  - Sumner D. Tilson
- Manager: Abie Urquhart
- Freshman coaches
  - Freshman head coach: Herbert McEver
  - Assistant freshman coach: Sumner D. Tilson
  - Assistant freshman coach: Bill Grinus
- Freshman Manager: J. V. D. Moore
