= 1933 Maryland Terrapins football team =

American college football season

1933 Maryland Terrapins football
- Conference: Southern Conference
- Record: 3–7 (1–4 SoCon)
- Head coach: Curley Byrd (23rd season)
- Home stadium: Byrd Stadium (original)

1933 Southern Conference football standings
	Conf.					Overall
Team	W		L		T	W		L		T
Duke +	4	–	0	–	0	9	–	1	–	0
South Carolina +	3	–	0	–	0	6	–	3	–	1
North Carolina	2	–	1	–	0	4	–	5	–	0
VMI	2	–	1	–	1	2	–	7	–	1
Washington and Lee	1	–	1	–	1	4	–	4	–	2
Clemson	1	–	1	–	0	3	–	6	–	2
VPI	1	–	1	–	3	4	–	3	–	3
Virginia	1	–	3	–	1	2	–	6	–	2
Maryland	1	–	4	–	0	3	–	7	–	0
NC State	0	–	4	–	0	1	–	5	–	3
+ – Conference co-champions

The 1933 Maryland Terrapins football team was an American football team that represented the University of Maryland in the Southern Conference (SoCon) during the 1933 college football season. In their 23rd season under head coach Curley Byrd, the Terrapins compiled a 3–7 record (1–4 against SoCon opponents), finished ninth in the SoCon, and were outscored by a total of 149 to 107.

== Schedule ==
Date	Opponent	Site	Result	Attendance	Source
September 30	St. John's (MD)*	Byrd Stadium; College Park, MD	W 20–0		
October 7	vs. VPI	Bain Field; Norfolk, VA	L 0–14		
October 14	at Tulane*	Tulane Stadium; New Orleans, LA	L 0–20	10,000	
October 21	at VMI	Alumni Field; Lexington, VA	L 13–19		
October 28	vs. Western Maryland*	Baltimore Stadium; Baltimore, MD	L 7–13	5,000	
November 4	at Virginia	Scott Stadium; Charlottesville, VA (rivalry)	L 0–6	5,000	
November 11	Duke	Byrd Stadium; College Park, MD	L 7–38		
November 18	at Johns Hopkins*	Homewood Field; Baltimore, MD	W 27–7	3,000	
November 25	Washington and Lee	Byrd Stadium; College Park, MD	W 33–13		
December 2	vs. Florida*	Plant Field; Tampa, FL	L 0–19	10,000	
*Non-conference game
