= 1933 Clemson Tigers football team =

American college football season

1933 Clemson Tigers football
- Conference: Southern Conference
- Record: 3–6–2 (1–1 SoCon)
- Head coach: Jess Neely (3rd season)
- Captain: John Heinemann
- Home stadium: Riggs Field

1933 Southern Conference football standings
	Conf.					Overall
Team	W		L		T	W		L		T
Duke +	4	–	0	–	0	9	–	1	–	0
South Carolina +	3	–	0	–	0	6	–	3	–	1
North Carolina	2	–	1	–	0	4	–	5	–	0
VMI	2	–	1	–	1	2	–	7	–	1
Washington and Lee	1	–	1	–	1	4	–	4	–	2
Clemson	1	–	1	–	0	3	–	6	–	2
VPI	1	–	1	–	3	4	–	3	–	3
Virginia	1	–	3	–	1	2	–	6	–	2
Maryland	1	–	4	–	0	3	–	7	–	0
NC State	0	–	4	–	0	1	–	5	–	3
+ – Conference co-champions

The 1933 Clemson Tigers football team was an American football team that represented Clemson College in the Southern Conference during the 1933 college football season. In their third season under head coach Jess Neely, the Tigers compiled a 3–6–2 record (1–1 against conference opponents), finished sixth in the conference, and was outscored by a total of 98 to 50.

The first night game in Clemson's history was played October 13 against George Washington at Griffith Stadium in Washington, D. C.

John Heinemann was the team captain. Two Clemson players were selected as first-team players on the 1933 All-Southern Conference football team: guard John Heinemann and tackle John Troutman.

== Schedule ==
Date	Opponent	Site	Result	Attendance	Source
September 23	Presbyterian*	Riggs Field; Clemson, SC	T 6–6		
September 30	at Georgia Tech*	Grant Field; Atlanta, GA (rivalry)	L 2–39	12,000	
October 7	NC State	Riggs Field; Clemson, SC (rivalry)	W 9–0	3,000	
October 13	at George Washington*	Griffith Stadium; Washington, DC	T 0–0	10,000	
October 19	at South Carolina	State Fairgrounds; Columbia, SC (rivalry)	L 0–7	15,000	
October 28	vs. Ole Miss*	Greer Field; Meridian, MS	L 0–13		
November 4	vs. Wake Forest*	Central Stadium; Charlotte, NC	W 13–0	4,500	
November 11	at Wofford*	Snyder Field; Spartanburg, SC	L 13–14		
November 18	vs. Mercer*	Municipal Stadium; Savannah, GA	L 0–13	6,000	
November 25	The Citadel*	Riggs Field; Clemson, SC	W 7–0		
November 30	at Furman*	Manley Field; Greenville, SC	L 0–6	13,000	
*Non-conference game
