= 1933 VMI Keydets football team =

American college football season

1933 VMI Keydets football
- Conference: Southern Conference
- Record: 2–7–1 (2–1–1 SoCon)
- Head coach: W. C. Raftery (7th season)
- Home stadium: Alumni Field

1933 Southern Conference football standings
	Conf.					Overall
Team	W		L		T	W		L		T
Duke +	4	–	0	–	0	9	–	1	–	0
South Carolina +	3	–	0	–	0	6	–	3	–	1
North Carolina	2	–	1	–	0	4	–	5	–	0
VMI	2	–	1	–	1	2	–	7	–	1
Washington and Lee	1	–	1	–	1	4	–	4	–	2
Clemson	1	–	1	–	0	3	–	6	–	2
VPI	1	–	1	–	3	4	–	3	–	3
Virginia	1	–	3	–	1	2	–	6	–	2
Maryland	1	–	4	–	0	3	–	7	–	0
NC State	0	–	4	–	0	1	–	5	–	3
+ – Conference co-champions

The 1933 VMI Keydets football team was an American football team that represented the Virginia Military Institute (VMI) during the 1933 college football season as a member of the Southern Conference. In their seventh year under head coach W. C. Raftery, the team compiled an overall record of 2–7–1.

== Schedule ==
Date	Opponent	Site	Result	Attendance	Source
September 23	Emory & Henry*	Alumni Field; Lexington, VA	L 0–20		
September 30	vs. Duke	World War Memorial Stadium; Greensboro, NC	L 6–37	10,000	
October 7	at Army*	Michie Stadium; West Point, NY	L 0–32	8,000	
October 14	at Davidson*	Richardson Field; Davidson, NC	L 0–6	2,500	
October 21	Maryland	Alumni Field; Lexington, VA	W 19–13		
October 28	at Virginia	Scott Stadium; Charlottesville, VA	W 13–12	9,000	
November 4	vs. William & Mary*	Bain Field; Norfolk, VA (rivalry)	L 0–14	4,000	
November 11	at Kentucky*	McLean Stadium; Lexington, KY	L 6–21		
November 18	at Richmond*	City Stadium; Richmond, VA (rivalry)	L 0–15		
November 30	vs. VPI	Maher Field; Roanoke, VA (rivalry)	T 0–0	11,000	
*Non-conference game
