= 1933 South Dakota State Jackrabbits football team =

American college football season

1933 South Dakota State Jackrabbits football

NCC champion
- Conference: North Central Conference
- Record: 6–3 (4–0 NCC)
- Head coach: Cy Kasper (6th season)
- Home stadium: State Field

1933 North Central Conference football standings
	Conf.					Overall
Team	W		L		T	W		L		T
South Dakota State $	4	–	0	–	0	6	–	3	–	0
North Dakota Agricultural	2	–	1	–	1	3	–	2	–	4
North Dakota	1	–	2	–	1	3	–	5	–	1
Morningside	1	–	3	–	0	4	–	4	–	0
South Dakota	1	–	3	–	0	5	–	6	–	0
$ – Conference champion

The 1933 South Dakota State Jackrabbits football team was an American football team that represented South Dakota State University in the North Central Conference (NCC) during the 1933 college football season. In its sixth season under head coach Cy Kasper, the team compiled a 6–3 record and outscored opponents by a total of 118 to 72.

== Schedule ==
Date	Opponent	Site	Result	Attendance	Source
September 23	Ntorthern Normal*	State Field; Brookings, SD	W 27–0		
September 30	at Minnesota*	Memorial Stadium; Minneapolis, MN	L 6–19	25,000	
October 14	North Dakota Agricultural	Dacotah Field; Fargo, ND (rivalry)	W 13–7		
October 21	North Dakota	State Field; Brookings, SD	W 18–2		
October 28	at South Dakota	Inman Field; Vermillion, SD (rivalry)	W 14–0		
November 4	at Michigan State Normal*	Alumni Field; Ypsilanti, MI	W 13–7	5,000	
November 11	Morningside	State Field; Brookings, SD	W 21–6		
November 18	vs. South Dakota	Sioux falls, SD	L 0–6		
November 24	at Catholic University*	Washington, DC	L 6–26		
*Non-conference game
