= 1933 Roanoke Maroons football team =

American college football season

1933 Roanoke Maroons football
- Conference: Virginia Conference
- Record: 4–5 (0–3 Virginia)
- Head coach: Gordon C. White (4th season)
- Home stadium: College Field

1933 Virginia Conference football standings
	Conf.					Overall
Team	W		L		T	W		L		T
Emory and Henry +	2	–	1	–	0	10	–	1	–	0
Richmond +	2	–	1	–	0	5	–	4	–	0
William & Mary +	2	–	1	–	0	6	–	5	–	0
Roanoke	0	–	3	–	0	4	–	5	–	0
+ – Conference co-champions

The 1933 Roanoke Maroons football team represented Roanoke College as a member of the Virginia Conference during the 1933 college football season. Led by fourth-year head coach Gordon C. White, the Maroons compiled an overall record of 4–5, with a mark of 0–3 in conference play, and finished fourth in the Virginia Conference.

== Schedule ==
Date	Opponent	Site	Result	Source
September 16	at William & Mary	Cary Field; Williamsburg, VA	L 6–7	
September 23	at VPI*	Miles Stadium; Blacksburg, VA	L 0–7	
September 30	at Washington and Lee*	Wilson Field; Lexington, VA	L 6–14	
October 7	Emory and Henry	College Field; Salem, VA	L 0–7	
October 13	Elon*	College Field; Salem, VA	W 20–6	
October 20	at Apprentice*	Apprentice Field; Newport News, VA	W 7–0	
October 28	at Hampden–Sydney*	Hampden-Sydney, VA	W 12–0	
November 4	at Richmond	City Stadium; Richmond, VA	L 0–19	
November 18	Randolph–Macon*	College Field; Salem, VA	W 7–0	
*Non-conference game
