= 1933 South Carolina Gamecocks football team =

American college football season

1933 South Carolina Gamecocks football

SoCon co-champion
- Conference: Southern Conference
- Record: 6–3–1 (3–0 SoCon)
- Head coach: Billy Laval (6th season)
- Captains: Earl Clary; Buddy Morehead
- Home stadium: Melton Field

1933 Southern Conference football standings
	Conf.					Overall
Team	W		L		T	W		L		T
Duke +	4	–	0	–	0	9	–	1	–	0
South Carolina +	3	–	0	–	0	6	–	3	–	1
North Carolina	2	–	1	–	0	4	–	5	–	0
VMI	2	–	1	–	1	2	–	7	–	1
Washington and Lee	1	–	1	–	1	4	–	4	–	2
Clemson	1	–	1	–	0	3	–	6	–	2
VPI	1	–	1	–	3	4	–	3	–	3
Virginia	1	–	3	–	1	2	–	6	–	2
Maryland	1	–	4	–	0	3	–	7	–	0
NC State	0	–	4	–	0	1	–	5	–	3
+ – Conference co-champions

The 1933 South Carolina Gamecocks football team represented the University of South Carolina as a member of the Southern Conference (SoCon) during the 1933 college football season. Led by sixth-year head coach Billy Laval, the Gamecocks compiled an overall record of 6–3–1 with a mark of 3–0 in conference play, and finished as co-conference champions alongside also undefeated Duke. This was the program's first conference championship in school history. Earl Clary and Buddy Morehead were the team captains. This was the last season in which South Carolina played their home games at Melton Field.

== Schedule ==
Date	Time	Opponent	Site	Result	Attendance	Source
September 23	3:30 p.m.	Wofford*	Melton Field; Columbia, SC	W 31–0	3,000	
September 29	8:30 p.m.	at Temple*	Temple Stadium; Philadelphia, PA	L 6–26	25,000	
October 7	3:00 p.m.	Villanova*	State Fairgrounds; Columbia, SC	L 6–15	6,000	
October 19	12:00 p.m.	Clemson	State Fairgrounds; Columbia, SC (rivalry)	W 7–0	14,000	
October 26	12:00 p.m.	vs. The Citadel*	County Fairgrounds; Orangeburg, SC	W 12–6	4,000	
October 28	2:30 p.m.	at VPI	Miles Stadium; Blacksburg, VA	W 12–0	10,000	
November 4	12:00 p.m.	at LSU*	Tiger Stadium; Baton Rouge, LA	L 7–30	8,000	
November 11	2:30 p.m.	NC State	Melton Field; Columbia, SC	W 14–0	2,000	
November 18	12:30 p.m.	Furman*	State Fairgrounds; Columbia, SC	T 0–0	12,000	
December 2	2:30 p.m.	at Auburn*	Legion Field; Birmingham, AL	W 16–14	8,000	
*Non-conference game

== Game summaries ==
=== Wofford ===
	1	2	3	4	Total
Wofford	0	0	0	0	0
South Carolina	12	0	0	19	31

On September 23, 1933, South Carolina faced Wofford. Earl Clary rushed for 109 yards in 15 attempts Hal Mauney gained 106 yards in 15 attempts, Wilburn Clary 90 yards in 14. For Wofford, Bouknight gained 34 yards on 9 tries. The Gamecocks piled up a total of 459, 367 rushing yards, and 92 passing yards. Wofford had 111 yards: 51 running, 60 passing. Approximately 3,000 saw the game at Melton Field.

=== Temple ===
	1	2	3	4	Total
South Carolina	0	6	0	0	6
Temple	6	6	7	7	26

On September 29, 1933, South Carolina faced Pop Warner's Temple Owls. It was Warner's Temple debut as coach and attracted 25,000 fans at Temple Stadium. In the first quarter E. Zukas returned a kick for 80 yards for temple giving them a 6–0 lead. Temple's fullback Stonick recorded the other two touchdowns. Harold Mauney for South Carolina completed a 56-yard pass to Craig, then ran it in for South Carolina's only score of the game. Late in the 4th quarter Temple's center Shapiro intercepted a Carolina pass on the latter side of the 16 yard line running it in for six. Stevens made the extra point which put Temple up 26–6.

=== Villanova ===
	1	2	3	4	Total
Villanova	0	6	9	0	15
South Carolina	0	0	6	0	6

On October 7, 1933, South Carolina faced Villanova in front of 6,000 spectators at the State Faigrounds. Villanova was led by dashing "Whitey" Randour one of the best halfbacks in the east. Randour carried it 18 times for 96 yards and 2 scores. The "Gaffney Ghost" did most of the carrying for the Gamecocks, he carried it 20 times for 54 yards.

=== Clemson ===
	1	2	3	4	Total
Clemson	0	0	0	0	0
South Carolina	7	0	0	0	7

In the annual State fair classic, Harold Mauney for South Carolina was the hero, recording 147 yards on 30 carries, he completed 3 passes for 39 yards. Wilburn Clary recorded 113 yards on 32 carries. Clemson only recorded four first downs the entire game, while the Gamecocks recorded 21 first downs. In the only score of the entire game Mauney passed to Fred Hambright for 25 yards in the first quarter. This was the third straight victory for South Carolina over rivals Clemson.

=== Citadel ===
	1	2	3	4	Total
South Carolina	6	0	0	6	12
Citadel	0	0	0	6	6

On October 26, 1933, at the Orangeburg Fairgrounds, South Carolina faced Citadel. On the seventh play of the game The "Gaffney ghost" Earl Clary sprinted 34 yards through the Citadal eleven for a Touchdown. Clary also scored late in the 4th period, despite accounting for all of the Gamecock scoring, Clary hardly played over 10 minutes. Clary rushed for 56 yards on 12 carries. For Citadel, Arthur Ferguson a hard-running halfback from Macon, GA scored Citadel's only touchdown late in the fourth period.

=== VPI ===
	1	2	3	4	Total
South Carolina	0	0	0	6	6
VPI	0	0	0	0	0

On October 28, South Carolina blanked the VPI Gobblers, 12–0, at Miles Stadium in Blacksburg, Virginia. Earl Clary scored both touchdowns for the Gamecocks.

=== LSU ===
	1	2	3	4	Total
South Carolina	0	7	0	0	7
LSU	3	0	20	7	30

South Carolina met LSU at Tiger Stadium on November the 4th, 1933 in front of about 8,000. South Carolina's only score came in the second quarter on a run by Earl Clary.

=== NC State ===
	1	2	3	4	Total
NC State	0	0	0	0	0
South Carolina	0	0	0	14	14

In the last game in the history of Melton field, Earl "The Gaffney Ghost" Clary starred as South Carolina defeated bitter rival NC State on November 11, 1933, and claimed the Southern Conference Championship with a perfect 3–0 record. Clary scored both touchdowns on long brilliant runs, and finished with 113 yards on 19 carries. At halftime Columbia celebrated the 15th year since the end of World War 1.

=== Furman ===
	1	2	3	4	Total
Furman	0	0	0	0	0
South Carolina	0	0	0	0	0

On November 19, 1933, South Carolina and Furman both failed to score any points in a draw. Earl Clary rushed for 80 yards on 28 carries, Scott for Furman rushed for 55 yards on 9 carries. Furman out-gained Carolina 130 yards to 119, and also had 1 more first down than the Gamecocks. Around 2,000 high school players from around the state of South Carolina were in attendance for the game at the State Fairgrounds, they received free tickets.

=== Auburn ===
	1	2	3	4	Total
South Carolina	0	9	0	7	16
Auburn	0	0	7	7	14

South Carolina legend Earl "The Ghost of Gaffney" Clary brought his legendary career to an end scoring both Gamecock touchdowns as South Carolina defeated Auburn at Legion field on December 2, 1933. South Carolina led by Earl Clary, and Harold Mauney rushed for 176 yards. Clary was called the "Gaffney Ghost" because of his great high school career at Gaffney high, and he was like a ghost trying to tackle him. He made all of South Carolina's touchdowns since the Clemson game, and led the South Carolina team to their only SoCon championship.
