= 1933 North Dakota Fighting Sioux football team =

American college football season

1933 North Dakota Fighting Sioux football
- Conference: North Central Conference
- Record: 3–5–1 (1–2–1 NCC)
- Head coach: Charles A. West (6th season)
- Home stadium: Memorial Stadium

1933 North Central Conference football standings
	Conf.					Overall
Team	W		L		T	W		L		T
South Dakota State $	4	–	0	–	0	6	–	3	–	0
North Dakota Agricultural	2	–	1	–	1	3	–	2	–	4
North Dakota	1	–	2	–	1	3	–	5	–	1
Morningside	1	–	3	–	0	4	–	4	–	0
South Dakota	1	–	3	–	0	5	–	6	–	0
$ – Conference champion

The 1933 North Dakota Fighting Sioux football team, also known as the Nodaks, was an American football team that represented the University of North Dakota in the North Central Conference (NCC) during the 1933 college football season. In its sixth year under head coach Charles A. West, the team compiled a 3–5–1 record (1–2–1 against NCC opponents), finished in third place out of five teams in the NCC, and was outscored by a total of 127 to 103.

== Schedule ==
Date	Time	Opponent	Site	Result	Attendance	Source
September 23	3:00 p.m.	at Winnipeg Rugby Club All-Stars*	Osborne Stadium; Winnipeg, MB	W 20–12		
October 6		George Washington*	Memorial Stadium; Grand Forks, ND	L 6–27		
October 13		South Dakota	Memorial Stadium; Grand Forks, ND	W 41–0		
October 21		at South Dakota State	Brookings, SD	L 2–18		
October 28		North Dakota Agricultural	Memorial Stadium; Grand Forks, ND	T 7–7		
November 4		at Morningside	Sioux City, IA	L 0–6		
November 11		at TCU*	Amon G. Carter Stadium; Fort Worth, TX	L 7–19		
November 15		at Dixie (TX)*	Fair Park Stadium; Dallas, TX	W 13–12	250	
November 19		at Loyola (LA)*	Loyola University Stadium; New Orleans, LA	L 7–26		
*Non-conference game; All times are in Central time
