= 1933 North Carolina Tar Heels football team =

American college football season

1933 North Carolina Tar Heels football
- Conference: Southern Conference
- Record: 4–5 (2–1 SoCon)
- Head coach: Chuck Collins (8th season)
- Captain: Bill Croom
- Home stadium: Kenan Memorial Stadium

1933 Southern Conference football standings
	Conf.					Overall
Team	W		L		T	W		L		T
Duke +	4	–	0	–	0	9	–	1	–	0
South Carolina +	3	–	0	–	0	6	–	3	–	1
North Carolina	2	–	1	–	0	4	–	5	–	0
VMI	2	–	1	–	1	2	–	7	–	1
Washington and Lee	1	–	1	–	1	4	–	4	–	2
Clemson	1	–	1	–	0	3	–	6	–	2
VPI	1	–	1	–	3	4	–	3	–	3
Virginia	1	–	3	–	1	2	–	6	–	2
Maryland	1	–	4	–	0	3	–	7	–	0
NC State	0	–	4	–	0	1	–	5	–	3
+ – Conference co-champions

The 1933 North Carolina Tar Heels football team represented the University of North Carolina at Chapel Hill during the 1933 college football season. The Tar Heels were led by eighth-year head coach Chuck Collins and played their home games at Kenan Memorial Stadium. They competed as a member of the Southern Conference. Collins' coaching contract expired at the conclusion of the season, and UNC elected not to renew his contract, citing lack of success on the field. He was 38–31–9 in his eight seasons as head coach.

== Schedule ==
Date	Time	Opponent	Site	Result	Attendance	Source
September 30	2:30 p.m.	Davidson*	Kenan Memorial Stadium; Chapel Hill, NC	W 6–0		
October 7	3:30 p.m.	at Vanderbilt*	New Dudley Field; Nashville, TN	L 13–20	6,000	
October 14	2:30 p.m.	Georgia*	Kenan Memorial Stadium; Chapel Hill, NC	L 0–30	10,000	
October 21	3:00 p.m.	at Florida*	Florida Field; Gainesville, FL	L 0–9		
October 28	2:00 p.m.	Georgia Tech*	Kenan Memorial Stadium; Chapel Hill, NC	L 6–10	9,000	
November 4	2:30 p.m.	at NC State	Riddick Field; Raleigh, NC (rivalry)	W 6–0	8,000	
November 11	2:00 p.m.	Wake Forest*	Kenan Memorial Stadium; Chapel Hill, NC (rivalry)	W 26–0	8,000	
November 18	2:00 p.m.	at Duke	Duke Stadium; Durham, NC (rivalry)	L 0–21	30,000	
November 30	2:00 p.m.	Virginia	Kenan Memorial Stadium; Chapel Hill, NC (rivalry)	W 14–0	20,000	
*Non-conference game; All times are in Eastern time
