= 1933 Virginia Cavaliers football team =

American college football season

1933 Virginia Cavaliers football
- Conference: Southern Conference
- Record: 2–6–2 (1–3–1 SoCon)
- Head coach: Fred Dawson (3rd season)
- Captain: Raye Burger
- Home stadium: Scott Stadium

1933 Southern Conference football standings
	Conf.					Overall
Team	W		L		T	W		L		T
Duke +	4	–	0	–	0	9	–	1	–	0
South Carolina +	3	–	0	–	0	6	–	3	–	1
North Carolina	2	–	1	–	0	4	–	5	–	0
VMI	2	–	1	–	1	2	–	7	–	1
Washington and Lee	1	–	1	–	1	4	–	4	–	2
Clemson	1	–	1	–	0	3	–	6	–	2
VPI	1	–	1	–	3	4	–	3	–	3
Virginia	1	–	3	–	1	2	–	6	–	2
Maryland	1	–	4	–	0	3	–	7	–	0
NC State	0	–	4	–	0	1	–	5	–	3
+ – Conference co-champions

The 1933 Virginia Cavaliers football team represented the University of Virginia during the 1933 college football season. The Cavaliers were led by third-year head coach Fred Dawson and played their home games at Scott Stadium in Charlottesville, Virginia. They competed as members of the Southern Conference, finishing with a conference record of 1–3–1 and a 2–6–2 record overall. After the season, Dawson resigned as head coach. He had an overall record of 8–17–4 at Virginia.

== Schedule ==
Date	Opponent	Site	Result	Attendance	Source
September 23	Hampden–Sydney*	Scott Stadium; Charlottesville, VA	T 7–7		
September 30	Randolph–Macon*	Scott Stadium; Charlottesville, VA	W 39–0		
October 7	at Ohio State*	Ohio Stadium; Columbus, OH	L 0–75	42,001	
October 14	at Columbia*	Baker Field; New York, NY	L 6–15	10,000	
October 21	at Navy*	Thompson Stadium; Annapolis, MD	L 7–13		
October 28	VMI^{†}	Scott Stadium; Charlottesville, VA	L 12–13	9,000	
November 4	Maryland	Scott Stadium; Charlottesville, VA (rivalry)	W 6–0	5,000	
November 11	at Washington and Lee	Wilson Field; Lexington, VA	L 0–6		
November 18	VPI	Scott Stadium; Charlottesville, VA (rivalry)	T 6–6	5,000	
November 30	at North Carolina	Kenan Memorial Stadium; Chapel Hill, NC (rivalry)	L 0–14	20,000	
*Non-conference game; ^{†}Homecoming
