= 1933 North Dakota Agricultural Bison football team =

American college football season

1933 North Dakota Agricultural Bison football
- Conference: North Central Conference
- Record: 3–2–4 (2–1–1 NCC)
- Head coach: Casey Finnegan (5th season)
- Captain: Roman Meyers
- Home stadium: Dacotah Field

1933 North Central Conference football standings
	Conf.					Overall
Team	W		L		T	W		L		T
South Dakota State $	4	–	0	–	0	6	–	3	–	0
North Dakota Agricultural	2	–	1	–	1	3	–	2	–	4
North Dakota	1	–	2	–	1	3	–	5	–	1
Morningside	1	–	3	–	0	4	–	4	–	0
South Dakota	1	–	3	–	0	5	–	6	–	0
$ – Conference champion

The 1933 North Dakota Agricultural Bison football team was an American football team that represented North Dakota Agricultural College (now known as North Dakota State University) in the North Central Conference (NCC) during the 1933 college football season. In its fifth season under head coach Casey Finnegan, the team compiled a 3–2–4 record (2–1–1 against NCC opponents) and finished in second place out of five teams in the NCC. The team played its home games at Dacotah Field in Fargo, North Dakota.

== Schedule ==
Date	Opponent	Site	Result	Attendance	Source
September 22	Concordia (MN)*	Dacotah Field; Fargo, ND	T 0–0		
September 29	St. Thomas (MN)*	Dacotah Field; Fargo, ND	T 7–7		
October 7	Morningside	Dacotah Field; Fargo, ND	W 7–0		
October 14	South Dakota State	Dacotah Field; Fargo, ND (rivalry)	L 7–13		
October 20	at Superior State*	Superior, WI	T 0–0		
October 28	at North Dakota	Memorial Stadium; Grand Forks, ND (rivalry)	T 7–7	5,000	
November 4	at Moorhead State*	Moorhead, MN	W 20–0		
November 11	at South Dakota	Inman Field; Vermillion, SD	W 14–0		
November 18	at Oklahoma City*	Goldbug Field; Oklahoma City, OK	L 0–19	3,500	
*Non-conference game
