= 1933 William & Mary Indians football team =

American college football season

1933 William & Mary Indians football

Virginia Conference co-champion
- Conference: Virginia Conference
- Record: 6–5 (2–1 Virginia)
- Head coach: John Kellison (3rd season)
- Captain: Gerald Quirk

1933 Virginia Conference football standings
	Conf.					Overall
Team	W		L		T	W		L		T
Emory and Henry +	2	–	1	–	0	10	–	1	–	0
Richmond +	2	–	1	–	0	5	–	4	–	0
William & Mary +	2	–	1	–	0	6	–	5	–	0
Roanoke	0	–	3	–	0	4	–	5	–	0
+ – Conference co-champions

The 1933 William & Mary Indians football team represented the College of William & Mary as a member of the Virginia Conference during the 1933 college football season. Led by third-year head coach, John Kellison the Indians compiled an overall record of 6–5 with a mark of 2–1 in conference play, sharing the Virginia Conference title with Emory and Henry and Richmond.

== Schedule ==
Date	Opponent	Site	Result	Attendance	Source
September 16	Roanoke	Cary Field; Williamsburg, VA	W 7–6		
September 23	Randolph–Macon*	Cary Field; Williamsburg, VA	W 12–0		
September 30	at Navy*	Thompson Stadium; Annapolis, MD	L 0–12	17,000	
October 7	at Washington and Lee*	Wilson Field; Lexington, VA	L 0–7		
October 14	VPI*	City Stadium; Richmond, VA	L 7–13	9,000	
October 21	Guilford*	Cary Field; Williamsburg, VA	W 37–7		
October 28	at Georgetown*	Griffith Stadium; Washington, DC	W 12–6		
November 4	vs. VMI*	Norfolk, VA (rivalry)	W 14–0	4,000	
November 11	at Emory and Henry	Fullerton Field; Emory, VA	L 6–25		
November 18	Davidson*^{†}	Cary Field; Williamsburg, VA	L 7–12	3,000	
November 30	at Richmond	City Stadium; Richmond, VA (rivalry)	W 6–0	14,000	
*Non-conference game; ^{†}Homecoming; Source:
