= 1933 NC State Wolfpack football team =

American college football season

1933 NC State Wolfpack football
- Conference: Southern Conference
- Record: 1–5–3 (0–4 SoCon)
- Head coach: Clipper Smith (3rd season)
- Home stadium: Riddick Stadium

1933 Southern Conference football standings
| | Conf. | | | | | Overall |
| Team | W | | L | | T | W | | L | | T |
|---|---|---|---|---|---|---|---|---|---|---|
| Duke + | 4 | – | 0 | – | 0 | 9 | – | 1 | – | 0 |
| South Carolina + | 3 | – | 0 | – | 0 | 6 | – | 3 | – | 1 |
| North Carolina | 2 | – | 1 | – | 0 | 4 | – | 5 | – | 0 |
| VMI | 2 | – | 1 | – | 1 | 2 | – | 7 | – | 1 |
| Washington and Lee | 1 | – | 1 | – | 1 | 4 | – | 4 | – | 2 |
| Clemson | 1 | – | 1 | – | 0 | 3 | – | 6 | – | 2 |
| VPI | 1 | – | 1 | – | 3 | 4 | – | 3 | – | 3 |
| Virginia | 1 | – | 3 | – | 1 | 2 | – | 6 | – | 2 |
| Maryland | 1 | – | 4 | – | 0 | 3 | – | 7 | – | 0 |
| NC State | 0 | – | 4 | – | 0 | 1 | – | 5 | – | 3 |
+ – Conference co-champions

The 1933 NC State Wolfpack football team was an American football team that represented North Carolina State University as a member of the Southern Conference (SoCon) during the 1933 college football season. In its third and final season under head coach Clipper Smith, the team compiled a 1–5–3 record (0–4 against SoCon opponents), finished in last place in the conference, and was outscored by a total of 62 to 23.

== Schedule ==
| Date | Opponent | Site | Result | Source |
|---|---|---|---|---|
| September 23 | Catawba* | Riddick Stadium; Raleigh, NC | W 7–0 | |
| September 30 | at Georgia* | Sanford Stadium; Athens, GA | L 10–20 | |
| October 7 | at Clemson | Riggs Field; Clemson, SC (rivalry) | L 0–9 | |
| October 14 | Florida* | Riddick Stadium; Raleigh, NC | T 0–0 | |
| October 21 | at Wake Forest* | Gore Field; Wake Forest, NC (rivalry) | T 0–0 | |
| October 28 | Davidson* | Riddick Stadium; Raleigh, NC | T 6–6 | |
| November 4 | North Carolina | Riddick Stadium; Raleigh, NC (rivalry) | L 0–6 | |
| November 11 | at South Carolina | Melton Field; Columbia, SC | L 0–14 | |
| November 25 | at Duke | Duke Stadium; Durham, NC (rivalry) | L 0–7 | |
*Non-conference game
