= 1933 East Carolina Teachers football team =

American college football season

1933 East Carolina Teachers football
- Conference: Independent
- Record: 1–5
- Head coach: Kenneth Beatty (2nd season)

1933 Southern college football independents records
	Conf.			Overall
Team	W	L	T	W		L		T
Oklahoma City		–		8	–	1	–	0
Tulsa		–		6	–	1	–	0
Troy State		–		5	–	1	–	0
Texas A&I		–		6	–	2	–	0
Catholic University		–		6	–	3	–	0
South Georgia Teachers		–		5	–	3	–	0
Western Maryland		–		5	–	3	–	0
William & Mary Norfolk		–		5	–	3	–	1
George Washington		–		5	–	3	–	1
Navy		–		5	–	4	–	0
Oglethorpe		–		4	–	5	–	0
Texas Mines		–		3	–	5	–	1
West Virginia		–		3	–	5	–	2
Delaware		–		2	–	4	–	2
Dixie (TX)		–		2	–	4	–	0
Georgetown		–		1	–	6	–	1
Jacksonville State		–		1	–	4	–	1
East Carolina		–		1	–	5	–	0
Wake Forest		–		0	–	5	–	1

The 1933 East Carolina Teachers football team was an American football team that represented East Carolina Teachers College—now known as East Carolina University—as an independent during the 1933 college football season. In their second and final season under head coach Kenneth Beatty, the team compiled a 1–5 record.

== Schedule ==
Date	Opponent	Site	Result	Source
October 6	at NC State freshmen	Riddick Stadium; Raleigh, NC	L 0–18	
October 20	Wake Forest freshmen	Greenville, NC	L 0–27	
October 28	at Guilford	Greensboro, NC	L 0–32	
November 3	Presbyterian Junior College	Greenville, NC	L 0–8	
November 11	Campbell	Greenville, NC	W 6–0	
November 24	Appalachian State	Greenville, NC	L 0–14	
