= 1933 William & Mary Norfolk Division Braves football team =

American college football season

1933 William & Mary Norfolk Division Braves football
- Conference: Independent
- Record: 5–3
- Head coach: Tommy Scott (4th season)
- Home stadium: Bain Field

1933 Southern college football independents records
	Conf.			Overall
Team	W	L	T	W		L		T
Oklahoma City		–		8	–	1	–	0
Tulsa		–		6	–	1	–	0
Troy State		–		5	–	1	–	0
Texas A&I		–		6	–	2	–	0
Catholic University		–		6	–	3	–	0
South Georgia Teachers		–		5	–	3	–	0
Western Maryland		–		5	–	3	–	0
William & Mary Norfolk		–		5	–	3	–	1
George Washington		–		5	–	3	–	1
Navy		–		5	–	4	–	0
Oglethorpe		–		4	–	5	–	0
Texas Mines		–		3	–	5	–	1
West Virginia		–		3	–	5	–	2
Delaware		–		2	–	4	–	2
Dixie (TX)		–		2	–	4	–	0
Georgetown		–		1	–	6	–	1
Jacksonville State		–		1	–	4	–	1
East Carolina		–		1	–	5	–	0
Wake Forest		–		0	–	5	–	1

The 1933 William & Mary Norfolk Division Braves football team represented the Norfolk Division of the College of William & Mary, now referred to as Old Dominion University, during the 1933 college football season. They finished with a 5–3 record and outscored their opponents 68–58.

== Schedule ==
Date	Time	Opponent	Site	Result	Source
October 6		at William & Mary freshmen	Williamsburg, VA	W 7–0	
October 14		Shenandoah	Bain Field; Norfolk, VA	L 0–6	
October 20		at Catholic University freshmen	Washington, DC	L 0–26	
October 27	3:15 p.m.	Maury High School	Bain Field; Norfolk, VA	W 6–0	
October 31		South Norfolk High School (VA)	Bain Field; Norfolk, VA	W 21–6	
November 10	3:00 p.m.	Augusta Military Academy	Bain Field; Norfolk, VA	W 7–0	
November 18	3:00 p.m.	at Cape Charles Athletic Club	Cape Charles, VA	W 27–0	
November 25	2:30 p.m.	Louisburg	Bain Field; Norfolk, VA	L 0–20	
All times are in Eastern time
