= 1933 Wake Forest Demon Deacons football team =

American college football season

1933 Wake Forest Demon Deacons football
- Conference: Independent
- Record: 0–5–1
- Head coach: Jim Weaver (1st season)
- Captain: Duncan Wilson
- Home stadium: Gore Field

1933 Southern college football independents records
| | Conf. | | | Overall |
| Team | W | L | T | W | | L | | T |
|---|---|---|---|---|---|---|---|---|
| Oklahoma City | | – | | 8 | – | 1 | – | 0 |
| Tulsa | | – | | 6 | – | 1 | – | 0 |
| Troy State | | – | | 5 | – | 1 | – | 0 |
| Texas A&I | | – | | 6 | – | 2 | – | 0 |
| Catholic University | | – | | 6 | – | 3 | – | 0 |
| South Georgia Teachers | | – | | 5 | – | 3 | – | 0 |
| Western Maryland | | – | | 5 | – | 3 | – | 0 |
| William & Mary Norfolk | | – | | 5 | – | 3 | – | 1 |
| George Washington | | – | | 5 | – | 3 | – | 1 |
| Navy | | – | | 5 | – | 4 | – | 0 |
| Oglethorpe | | – | | 4 | – | 5 | – | 0 |
| Texas Mines | | – | | 3 | – | 5 | – | 1 |
| West Virginia | | – | | 3 | – | 5 | – | 2 |
| Delaware | | – | | 2 | – | 4 | – | 2 |
| Dixie (TX) | | – | | 2 | – | 4 | – | 0 |
| Georgetown | | – | | 1 | – | 6 | – | 1 |
| Jacksonville State | | – | | 1 | – | 4 | – | 1 |
| East Carolina | | – | | 1 | – | 5 | – | 0 |
| Wake Forest | | – | | 0 | – | 5 | – | 1 |

The 1933 Wake Forest Demon Deacons football team was an American football team that represented Wake Forest College (now known as Wake Forest University) during the 1933 college football season. In its first season under head coach Jim Weaver, the team compiled a 0–5–1 record.

== Schedule ==
| Date | Opponent | Site | Result | Attendance | Source |
|---|---|---|---|---|---|
| October 7 | at Duke | Duke Stadium; Durham, NC (rivalry) | L 0–22 | 8,000 | |
| October 21 | NC State | Gore Field; Wake Forest, NC (rivalry) | T 0–0 | | |
| October 27 | Catholic University | Gore Field; Wake Forest, NC | L 0–12 | | |
| November 4 | vs. Clemson | Central High School Stadium; Charlotte, NC | L 0–9 | 4,500 | |
| November 11 | at North Carolina | Kenan Memorial Stadium; Chapel Hill, NC (rivalry) | L 0–26 | 8,000 | |
| November 30 | vs. Davidson | Central High School Stadium; Charlotte, NC | L 13–20 | 10,000 | |
