= 1933 Troy State Red Wave football team =

American college football season

1933 Troy State Red Wave football
- Conference: Independent
- Record: 5–1
- Head coach: Albert Elmore (3rd season)
- Home stadium: Pace Field

1933 Southern college football independents records
	Conf.			Overall
Team	W	L	T	W		L		T
Oklahoma City		–		8	–	1	–	0
Tulsa		–		6	–	1	–	0
Troy State		–		5	–	1	–	0
Texas A&I		–		6	–	2	–	0
Catholic University		–		6	–	3	–	0
South Georgia Teachers		–		5	–	3	–	0
Western Maryland		–		5	–	3	–	0
William & Mary Norfolk		–		5	–	3	–	1
George Washington		–		5	–	3	–	1
Navy		–		5	–	4	–	0
Oglethorpe		–		4	–	5	–	0
Texas Mines		–		3	–	5	–	1
West Virginia		–		3	–	5	–	2
Delaware		–		2	–	4	–	2
Dixie (TX)		–		2	–	4	–	0
Georgetown		–		1	–	6	–	1
Jacksonville State		–		1	–	4	–	1
East Carolina		–		1	–	5	–	0
Wake Forest		–		0	–	5	–	1

The 1933 Troy State Red Wave football team represented Troy State Teachers College (now known as Troy University) as an independent during the 1933 college football season. Led by third-year head coach Albert Elmore, the Red Wave compiled an overall record of 5–1.

== Schedule ==
Date	Opponent	Site	Result	Source
October 6	South Georgia State	Pace Field; Troy, AL	W 24–0	
October 20	Middle Georgia	Pace Field; Troy, AL	L 0–19	
October 28	at Pensacola NAS	Legion Field; Pensacola, FL	W 6–0	
November 4	East Mississippi	Pace Field; Troy, AL	W 19–0	
November 11	at Jacksonville State	Jacksonville, AL (rivalry)	W 18–7	
November 17	Marion	Pace Field; Troy, AL	W 26–0	
