= 1933 Tulsa Golden Hurricane football team =

American college football season

1933 Tulsa Golden Hurricane football
- Conference: Independent
- Record: 6–1
- Head coach: Gus Henderson (9th season)
- Home stadium: Skelly Field

1933 Southern college football independents records
	Conf.			Overall
Team	W	L	T	W		L		T
Oklahoma City		–		8	–	1	–	0
Tulsa		–		6	–	1	–	0
Troy State		–		5	–	1	–	0
Texas A&I		–		6	–	2	–	0
Catholic University		–		6	–	3	–	0
South Georgia Teachers		–		5	–	3	–	0
Western Maryland		–		5	–	3	–	0
William & Mary Norfolk		–		5	–	3	–	1
George Washington		–		5	–	3	–	1
Navy		–		5	–	4	–	0
Oglethorpe		–		4	–	5	–	0
Texas Mines		–		3	–	5	–	1
West Virginia		–		3	–	5	–	2
Delaware		–		2	–	4	–	2
Dixie (TX)		–		2	–	4	–	0
Georgetown		–		1	–	6	–	1
Jacksonville State		–		1	–	4	–	1
East Carolina		–		1	–	5	–	0
Wake Forest		–		0	–	5	–	1

The 1933 Tulsa Golden Hurricane football team represented the University of Tulsa during the 1933 college football season. In their ninth year under head coach Gus Henderson, the Golden Hurricane compiled a 6–1 record. The team gave up an average of only 2.6 points per game, defeated Oklahoma (20–6) and Arkansas (7–0), but lost to Oklahoma A&M (7–0).

== Schedule ==
Date	Opponent	Site	Result	Attendance	Source
October 7	Oklahoma	Skelly Field; Tulsa, OK	W 20–6		
October 12	at Washburn	Moore Bowl; Topeka, KS	W 7–0		
October 21	Kansas	Skelly Field; Tulsa, OK	W 7–0		
November 4	Oklahoma A&M^{†}	Skelly Field; Tulsa, OK (rivalry)	L 0–7		
November 11	Oklahoma City	Skelly Field; Tulsa, OK	W 39–0	13,000–14,000	
November 17	at George Washington	Griffith Stadium; Washington, DC	W 13–6		
November 30	Arkansas	Skelly Field; Tulsa, OK	W 7–0	18,000	
^{†}Homecoming
