= 1933 Navy Midshipmen football team =

American college football season

1933 Navy Midshipmen football
- Conference: Independent
- Record: 5–4
- Head coach: Edgar Miller (3rd season)
- Captain: Hugh Murray
- Home stadium: Thompson Stadium

1933 Southern college football independents records
	Conf.			Overall
Team	W	L	T	W		L		T
Oklahoma City		–		8	–	1	–	0
Tulsa		–		6	–	1	–	0
Troy State		–		5	–	1	–	0
Texas A&I		–		6	–	2	–	0
Catholic University		–		6	–	3	–	0
South Georgia Teachers		–		5	–	3	–	0
Western Maryland		–		5	–	3	–	0
William & Mary Norfolk		–		5	–	3	–	1
George Washington		–		5	–	3	–	1
Navy		–		5	–	4	–	0
Oglethorpe		–		4	–	5	–	0
Texas Mines		–		3	–	5	–	1
West Virginia		–		3	–	5	–	2
Delaware		–		2	–	4	–	2
Dixie (TX)		–		2	–	4	–	0
Georgetown		–		1	–	6	–	1
Jacksonville State		–		1	–	4	–	1
East Carolina		–		1	–	5	–	0
Wake Forest		–		0	–	5	–	1

The 1933 Navy Midshipmen football team represented the United States Naval Academy during the 1933 college football season. In their third season under head coach Edgar Miller, the Midshipmen compiled a 5–4 record and outscored their opponents by a combined score of 90 to 86.

== Schedule ==
Date	Opponent	Site	Result	Attendance	Source
September 30	William & Mary	Thompson Stadium; Annapolis, MD	W 12–0		
October 7	Mercer	Thompson Stadium; Annapolis, MD	W 25–6	13,000	
October 14	at Pittsburgh	Pitt Stadium; Pittsburgh, PA	L 6–34		
October 21	Virginia	Thompson Stadium; Annapolis, MD	W 13–7		
October 28	at Penn	Franklin Field; Philadelphia, PA	W 13–0		
November 4	vs. Notre Dame	Municipal Stadium; Baltimore, MD (rivalry)	W 7–0	34,579	
November 11	at Columbia	Baker Field; New York, NY	L 7–14		
November 18	at Princeton	Palmer Stadium; Princeton, NJ	L 0–13	35,000	
November 25	vs. Army	Franklin Field; Philadelphia, PA (Army–Navy Game)	L 7–12		
