= 1933 Jacksonville State Eagle Owls football team =

American college football season

1933 Jacksonville State Eagle Owls football
- Conference: Independent
- Record: 1–4–1
- Head coach: T. B. Shotts (3rd season)
- Home stadium: College Field

1933 Southern college football independents records
	Conf.			Overall
Team	W	L	T	W		L		T
Oklahoma City		–		8	–	1	–	0
Tulsa		–		6	–	1	–	0
Troy State		–		5	–	1	–	0
Texas A&I		–		6	–	2	–	0
Catholic University		–		6	–	3	–	0
South Georgia Teachers		–		5	–	3	–	0
Western Maryland		–		5	–	3	–	0
William & Mary Norfolk		–		5	–	3	–	1
George Washington		–		5	–	3	–	1
Navy		–		5	–	4	–	0
Oglethorpe		–		4	–	5	–	0
Texas Mines		–		3	–	5	–	1
West Virginia		–		3	–	5	–	2
Delaware		–		2	–	4	–	2
Dixie (TX)		–		2	–	4	–	0
Georgetown		–		1	–	6	–	1
Jacksonville State		–		1	–	4	–	1
East Carolina		–		1	–	5	–	0
Wake Forest		–		0	–	5	–	1

The 1933 Jacksonville State Eagle Owls football team represented Jacksonville State Teachers College (now known as Jacksonville State University) as an independent during the 1933 college football season. Led by third-year head coach T. B. Shotts, the Eagle Owls compiled an overall record of 1–4–1.

== Schedule ==
Date	Opponent	Site	Result	Source
September 22	at Howard (AL)	Legion Field; Birmingham, AL (rivalry)	L 0–31	
October 7	Cumberland (TN)	College Field; Jacksonville, AL	L 12–14	
October 14	at Middle Tennessee State Teachers	Murfreesboro, TN	T 0–0	
October 27	at Birmingham–Southern	Munger Bowl; Birmingham, AL	L 0–38	
November 4	Piedmont	College Field; Jacksonville, AL	W 40–0	
November 11	Troy State	College Field; Jacksonville, AL (rivalry)	L 7–18	
