= 1933 Oglethorpe Stormy Petrels football team =

American college football season

1933 Oglethorpe Stormy Petrels football
- Conference: Independent
- Record: 4–5
- Head coach: Harry J. Robertson (10th season)
- Home stadium: Hermance Stadium; Ponce de Leon Park

1933 Southern college football independents records
	Conf.			Overall
Team	W	L	T	W		L		T
Oklahoma City		–		8	–	1	–	0
Tulsa		–		6	–	1	–	0
Troy State		–		5	–	1	–	0
Texas A&I		–		6	–	2	–	0
Catholic University		–		6	–	3	–	0
South Georgia Teachers		–		5	–	3	–	0
Western Maryland		–		5	–	3	–	0
William & Mary Norfolk		–		5	–	3	–	1
George Washington		–		5	–	3	–	1
Navy		–		5	–	4	–	0
Oglethorpe		–		4	–	5	–	0
Texas Mines		–		3	–	5	–	1
West Virginia		–		3	–	5	–	2
Delaware		–		2	–	4	–	2
Dixie (TX)		–		2	–	4	–	0
Georgetown		–		1	–	6	–	1
Jacksonville State		–		1	–	4	–	1
East Carolina		–		1	–	5	–	0
Wake Forest		–		0	–	5	–	1

The 1933 Oglethorpe Stormy Petrels football team was an American football team that represented Oglethorpe University as an independent during the 1933 college football season. In their tenth year under head coach Harry J. Robertson, the Stormy Petrels compiled a 4–5 record.

== Schedule ==
Date	Opponent	Site	Result	Attendance	Source
September 21	Newberry	Ponce de Leon Park; Atlanta, GA	W 25–0	2,500	
September 30	at Alabama	Denny Stadium; Tuscaloosa, AL	L 0–34	12,000	
October 7	at Manhattan	Ebbets Field; Brooklyn, NY	W 6–0		
October 14	at Chattanooga	Chamberlain Field; Chattanooga, TN	L 12–16		
October 19	Stetson	Ponce de Leon Park; Atlanta, GA	W 13–6	2,000	
October 28	Erskine	Hermance Stadium; North Atlanta, GA	W 13–6		
November 11	at Auburn	Drake Field; Auburn, AL	L 6–27	6,000	
November 18	vs. The Citadel	Augusta, GA	L 0–13	5,000	
December 2	at Mercer	Centennial Stadium; Macon, GA	L 0–31		
