= 1933 Western Maryland Green Terror football team =

American college football season

1933 Western Maryland Green Terror football
- Conference: Independent
- Record: 5–3
- Head coach: Dick Harlow (8th season)
- Captains: James W. Dunn; Al Sadusky

1933 Southern college football independents records
	Conf.			Overall
Team	W	L	T	W		L		T
Oklahoma City		–		8	–	1	–	0
Tulsa		–		6	–	1	–	0
Troy State		–		5	–	1	–	0
Texas A&I		–		6	–	2	–	0
Catholic University		–		6	–	3	–	0
South Georgia Teachers		–		5	–	3	–	0
Western Maryland		–		5	–	3	–	0
William & Mary Norfolk		–		5	–	3	–	1
George Washington		–		5	–	3	–	1
Navy		–		5	–	4	–	0
Oglethorpe		–		4	–	5	–	0
Texas Mines		–		3	–	5	–	1
West Virginia		–		3	–	5	–	2
Delaware		–		2	–	4	–	2
Dixie (TX)		–		2	–	4	–	0
Georgetown		–		1	–	6	–	1
Jacksonville State		–		1	–	4	–	1
East Carolina		–		1	–	5	–	0
Wake Forest		–		0	–	5	–	1

The 1933 Western Maryland Green Terror football team was an American football team that represented Western Maryland College (now known as McDaniel College) as an independent during the 1933 college football season. In its eighth season under head coach Dick Harlow, the team achieved a 5–3 record. The team was captained by James W. Dunn and Al Sadusky. Home games were played at Hoffa Field in Westminster, Maryland, with halfback Bill Shepherd standing out as the team's offensive star.

Harlow coached Western Maryland for nine years, leading the football team to a 60–13–7 record. He was later inducted into the College Football Hall of Fame.

== Schedule ==
Date	Opponent	Site	Result	Attendance	Source
September 30	at St. Thomas (PA)	Scranton, PA	L 2–12	5,000	
October 7	at Mount St. Mary's	Echo Field; Emmitsburg, MD	W 7–0		
October 13	at Duquesne	Forbes Field; Pittsburgh, PA	L 0–13	10,000	
October 21	vs. Georgetown	Baltimore Stadium; Baltimore, MD	W 20–0	4,000	
October 28	vs. Maryland	Baltimore Stadium; Baltimore, MD	W 13–7	5,000	
November 4	vs. Bucknell	Scranton, PA	W 14–13	4,000	
November 11	vs. Loyola (MD)	Homewood Field; Baltimore, MD	W 54–0		
November 18	at Boston College	Alumni Field; Chestnut Hill, MA	L 9–12		
