= 1933 Texas Mines Miners football team =

American college football season

1933 Texas Mines Miners football
- Conference: Independent
- Record: 3–5–1
- Head coach: Mack Saxon (5th season)
- Home stadium: Kidd Field

1933 Southern college football independents records
	Conf.			Overall
Team	W	L	T	W		L		T
Oklahoma City		–		8	–	1	–	0
Tulsa		–		6	–	1	–	0
Troy State		–		5	–	1	–	0
Texas A&I		–		6	–	2	–	0
Catholic University		–		6	–	3	–	0
South Georgia Teachers		–		5	–	3	–	0
Western Maryland		–		5	–	3	–	0
William & Mary Norfolk		–		5	–	3	–	1
George Washington		–		5	–	3	–	1
Navy		–		5	–	4	–	0
Oglethorpe		–		4	–	5	–	0
Texas Mines		–		3	–	5	–	1
West Virginia		–		3	–	5	–	2
Delaware		–		2	–	4	–	2
Dixie (TX)		–		2	–	4	–	0
Georgetown		–		1	–	6	–	1
Jacksonville State		–		1	–	4	–	1
East Carolina		–		1	–	5	–	0
Wake Forest		–		0	–	5	–	1

The 1933 Texas Mines Miners football team, sometimes known as the "Muckers", was an American football team that represented Texas School of Mines (now known as the University of Texas at El Paso) as an independent during the 1933 college football season. In its fifth season under head coach Mack Saxon, the team compiled a 3–5–1 record and was outscored by a total of 85 to 71.

== Schedule ==
Date	Opponent	Site	Result	Attendance	Source
September 30	at Texas	War Memorial Stadium; Austin, TX	L 6–22		
October 7	at SMU	Ownby Stadium; Dallas, TX	L 6–27	30,000	
October 14	Howard Payne	Kidd Field; El Paso, TX	L 0–6	2,500	
October 21	at New Mexico Military	Roswell, NM	T 6–6		
October 28	Texas Tech	Kidd Field; El Paso, TX	L 0–12		
November 4	New Mexico A&M^{†}	Kidd Field; El Paso, TX (rivalry)	W 9–0		
November 11	Sul Ross	Kidd Field; El Paso, TX	W 34–0		
November 18	Simmons (TX)	Kidd Field; El Paso, TX	W 10–6		
November 25	vs. St. Edward's	Eagle Field; San Antonio, TX	L 0–6	1,500	
^{†}Homecoming
