= 1933 George Washington Colonials football team =

American college football season

1933 George Washington Colonials football
- Conference: Independent
- Record: 5–3–1
- Head coach: Jim Pixlee (5th season)
- Home stadium: Griffith Stadium

1933 Southern college football independents records
	Conf.			Overall
Team	W	L	T	W		L		T
Oklahoma City		–		8	–	1	–	0
Tulsa		–		6	–	1	–	0
Troy State		–		5	–	1	–	0
Texas A&I		–		6	–	2	–	0
Catholic University		–		6	–	3	–	0
South Georgia Teachers		–		5	–	3	–	0
Western Maryland		–		5	–	3	–	0
William & Mary Norfolk		–		5	–	3	–	1
George Washington		–		5	–	3	–	1
Navy		–		5	–	4	–	0
Oglethorpe		–		4	–	5	–	0
Texas Mines		–		3	–	5	–	1
West Virginia		–		3	–	5	–	2
Delaware		–		2	–	4	–	2
Dixie (TX)		–		2	–	4	–	0
Georgetown		–		1	–	6	–	1
Jacksonville State		–		1	–	4	–	1
East Carolina		–		1	–	5	–	0
Wake Forest		–		0	–	5	–	1

The 1933 George Washington Colonials football team was an American football team that represented George Washington University as an independent during the 1933 college football season. In its fifth season under head coach Jim Pixlee, the team compiled a 5–3–1 record and outscored opponents by a total of 125 to 51. The team defeated Auburn, tied with Clemson, and lost to Tennessee, Tulsa, and Kansas.

== Schedule ==
Date	Opponent	Site	Result	Attendance	Source
September 30	Catawba	Griffith Stadium; Washington, DC	W 27–0		
October 7	at North Dakota	Memorial Stadium; Grand Forks, ND	W 27–6		
October 13	Clemson	Griffith Stadium; Washington, DC	T 0–0	10,000	
October 21	Auburn	Griffith Stadium; Washington, DC	W 19–6		
October 27	West Virginia Wesleyan	Griffith Stadium; Washington, DC	W 33–0	10,000	
November 4	Tennessee	Griffith Stadium; Washington, DC	L 0–13	25,000	
November 10	Washington & Jefferson	Griffith Stadium; Washington, DC	W 13–6	7,500	
November 17	Tulsa	Griffith Stadium; Washington, DC	L 6–13		
December 2	Kansas	Griffith Stadium; Washington, DC	L 0–7	10,000	
