= 1933 Oklahoma City Goldbugs football team =

American college football season

1933 Oklahoma City Goldbugs football
- Conference: Independent
- Record: 8–1
- Head coach: Wesley Fry (1st season)
- Home stadium: Goldbug Field

1933 Southern college football independents records
	Conf.			Overall
Team	W	L	T	W		L		T
Oklahoma City		–		8	–	1	–	0
Tulsa		–		6	–	1	–	0
Troy State		–		5	–	1	–	0
Texas A&I		–		6	–	2	–	0
Catholic University		–		6	–	3	–	0
South Georgia Teachers		–		5	–	3	–	0
Western Maryland		–		5	–	3	–	0
William & Mary Norfolk		–		5	–	3	–	1
George Washington		–		5	–	3	–	1
Navy		–		5	–	4	–	0
Oglethorpe		–		4	–	5	–	0
Texas Mines		–		3	–	5	–	1
West Virginia		–		3	–	5	–	2
Delaware		–		2	–	4	–	2
Dixie (TX)		–		2	–	4	–	0
Georgetown		–		1	–	6	–	1
Jacksonville State		–		1	–	4	–	1
East Carolina		–		1	–	5	–	0
Wake Forest		–		0	–	5	–	1

The 1933 Oklahoma City Goldbugs football team represented Oklahoma City University as an independent during the 1933 college football season. Led by Wesley Fry in his first and only season as head coach, the Goldbugs compiled a record of 8–1.

== Schedule ==
Date	Time	Opponent	Site	Result	Attendance	Source
September 22	8:00 p.m.	Bacone	Goldbug Field; Oklahoma City, OK	W 38–0		
September 28		Southwestern (KS)	Goldbug Field; Oklahoma City, OK	W 33–2		
October 7	8:00 p.m.	Wichita	Goldbug Field; Oklahoma City, OK	W 26–19		
October 13		Oklahoma A&M^{†}	Goldbug Field; Oklahoma City, OK	W 19–13	10,000	
October 28		at West Texas State	Canyon, TX	W 32–13		
November 11		at Tulsa	Skelly Field; Tulsa, OK	L 0–39	13,000–14,000	
November 18		North Dakota Agricultural	Goldbug Field; Oklahoma City, OK	W 19–0	3,500	
November 25		Central State (OK)	Goldbug Field; Oklahoma City, OK	W 20–0		
November 29	7:45 p.m.	Oklahoma Baptist	Goldbug Field; Oklahoma City, OK	W 25–18		
^{†}Homecoming; All times are in Central time
