= 1933 West Virginia Mountaineers football team =

American college football season

1933 West Virginia Mountaineers football
- Conference: Independent
- Record: 3–5–3
- Head coach: Greasy Neale (3rd season)
- Captain: Arthur Swisher
- Home stadium: Mountaineer Field

1933 Southern college football independents records
	Conf.			Overall
Team	W	L	T	W		L		T
Oklahoma City		–		8	–	1	–	0
Tulsa		–		6	–	1	–	0
Troy State		–		5	–	1	–	0
Texas A&I		–		6	–	2	–	0
Catholic University		–		6	–	3	–	0
South Georgia Teachers		–		5	–	3	–	0
Western Maryland		–		5	–	3	–	0
William & Mary Norfolk		–		5	–	3	–	1
George Washington		–		5	–	3	–	1
Navy		–		5	–	4	–	0
Oglethorpe		–		4	–	5	–	0
Texas Mines		–		3	–	5	–	1
West Virginia		–		3	–	5	–	2
Delaware		–		2	–	4	–	2
Dixie (TX)		–		2	–	4	–	0
Georgetown		–		1	–	6	–	1
Jacksonville State		–		1	–	4	–	1
East Carolina		–		1	–	5	–	0
Wake Forest		–		0	–	5	–	1

The 1933 West Virginia Mountaineers football team was an American football team that represented West Virginia University as an independent during the 1933 college football season. In its third season under head coach Greasy Neale, the team compiled a 3–5–3 record and was outscored by opponents by a total of 145 to 87. The team played its home games at Mountaineer Field in Morgantown, West Virginia. Arthur Swisher was the team captain.

== Schedule ==
Date	Opponent	Site	Result	Attendance	Source
September 23	vs. Washington and Lee	Laidley Field; Charleston, WV	T 0–0		
September 29	at Duquesne	Forbes Field; Pittsburgh, PA	L 7–19	22,000	
October 7	at Pittsburgh	Pitt Stadium; Pittsburgh, PA (rivalry)	L 0–21	10,000	
October 14	at Fordham	Polo Grounds; New York, NY	L 0–20	18,000	
October 20	at Temple	Temple Stadium; Philadelphia, PA	L 7–13	15,000	
October 28	Davis & Elkins	Mountaineer Field; Morgantown, WV	T 7–7	8,000	
November 4	Marquette	Mountaineer Field; Morgantown, WV	T 13–13		
November 11	at Wisconsin	Camp Randall Stadium; Madison, WI	L 6–25	11,000	
November 18	West Virginia Wesleyan	Mountaineer Field; Morgantown, WV	W 26–13	4,000	
November 25	at Georgetown	Griffith Stadium; Washington, DC	W 14–12		
November 30	Washington & Jefferson	Mountaineer Field; Morgantown, WV	W 7–2	7,000	
