= 1933 Delaware Fightin' Blue Hens football team =

American college football season

1933 Delaware Fightin' Blue Hens football
- Conference: Independent
- Record: 2–4–2
- Head coach: Charles Rogers (3rd season)
- Home stadium: Frazer Field

1933 Southern college football independents records
	Conf.			Overall
Team	W	L	T	W		L		T
Oklahoma City		–		8	–	1	–	0
Tulsa		–		6	–	1	–	0
Troy State		–		5	–	1	–	0
Texas A&I		–		6	–	2	–	0
Catholic University		–		6	–	3	–	0
South Georgia Teachers		–		5	–	3	–	0
Western Maryland		–		5	–	3	–	0
William & Mary Norfolk		–		5	–	3	–	1
George Washington		–		5	–	3	–	1
Navy		–		5	–	4	–	0
Oglethorpe		–		4	–	5	–	0
Texas Mines		–		3	–	5	–	1
West Virginia		–		3	–	5	–	2
Delaware		–		2	–	4	–	2
Dixie (TX)		–		2	–	4	–	0
Georgetown		–		1	–	6	–	1
Jacksonville State		–		1	–	4	–	1
East Carolina		–		1	–	5	–	0
Wake Forest		–		0	–	5	–	1

The 1933 Delaware Fightin' Blue Hens football team was an American football team that represented the University of Delaware in the 1933 college football season. In their third season under head coach Charles Rogers, the Blue Hens compiled a 2–4–2 record and were outscored by a total of 102 to 46. The team played its home games at Frazer Field in Newark, Delaware.

== Schedule ==
Date	Opponent	Site	Result	Attendance	Source
October 7	Baltimore	Frazer Field; Newark, DE	W 26–0		
October 14	at Army	Michie Stadium; West Point, NY	L 0–52		
October 21	at Washington College	Chestertown, MD	W 8–0		
October 28	Lebanon Valley	Frazer Field; Newark, DE	L 6–13		
November 4	at Drexel	Drexel Field; Philadelphia, PA	L 0–6	3,500	
November 11	vs. Pennsylvania Military	Municipal Auditorium; Atlantic City, NJ	L 0–25	12,000	
November 18	Saint Joseph's	Frazer Field; Newark, DE	T 0–0		
November 25	Juniata	Frazer Field; Newark, DE	T 6–6		
