= 1933 South Georgia Teachers Blue Tide football team =

American college football season

1933 South Georgia Teachers Blue Tide football
- Conference: Independent
- Record: 5–3
- Head coach: Crook Smith (5th season)

1933 Southern college football independents records
	Conf.			Overall
Team	W	L	T	W		L		T
Oklahoma City		–		8	–	1	–	0
Tulsa		–		6	–	1	–	0
Troy State		–		5	–	1	–	0
Texas A&I		–		6	–	2	–	0
Catholic University		–		6	–	3	–	0
South Georgia Teachers		–		5	–	3	–	0
Western Maryland		–		5	–	3	–	0
William & Mary Norfolk		–		5	–	3	–	1
George Washington		–		5	–	3	–	1
Navy		–		5	–	4	–	0
Oglethorpe		–		4	–	5	–	0
Texas Mines		–		3	–	5	–	1
West Virginia		–		3	–	5	–	2
Delaware		–		2	–	4	–	2
Dixie (TX)		–		2	–	4	–	0
Georgetown		–		1	–	6	–	1
Jacksonville State		–		1	–	4	–	1
East Carolina		–		1	–	5	–	0
Wake Forest		–		0	–	5	–	1

The 1933 South Georgia Teachers Blue Tide football team represented the South Georgia Teachers College—now known as Georgia Southern University—during the 1933 college football season. The team was led by Crook Smith in his fifth year as head coach.

== Schedule ==
Date	Time	Opponent	Site	Result	Source
October 6		at Norman Junior College	Norman Park, GA	W 46–0	
October 13		Gordon (GA)	Statesboro, GA	W 39–0	
October 20		Brewton–Parker	Statesboro, GA	W 39–13	
October 27		at Middle Georgia	Cochran, GA	L 0–6	
November 4	8:30 p.m.	at Rollins	Tinker Field; Orlando, FL	L 0–13	
November 10		South Georgia State	Statesboro, GA	W 25–0	
November 17		at Georgia Military	Davenport Field; Milledgeville, GA	W 12–9	
November 30		Newberry	Statesboro, GA	L 6–14	
All times are in Eastern time
