= 1933 Dixie Rebels football team =

American college football season

1933 Dixie Rebels football
- Conference: Independent
- Record: 2–4
- Head coach: Nick Dobbs (2nd season, first five games); Jim Hamrick (1st season, final game)
- Captains: Jodie Whire (first three games); Jake "Rabbit" Minnehan (last three games)
- Home stadium: Steer Stadium, Fair Park Stadium

1933 Southern college football independents records
	Conf.			Overall
Team	W	L	T	W		L		T
Oklahoma City		–		8	–	1	–	0
Tulsa		–		6	–	1	–	0
Troy State		–		5	–	1	–	0
Texas A&I		–		6	–	2	–	0
Catholic University		–		6	–	3	–	0
South Georgia Teachers		–		5	–	3	–	0
Western Maryland		–		5	–	3	–	0
William & Mary Norfolk		–		5	–	3	–	1
George Washington		–		5	–	3	–	1
Navy		–		5	–	4	–	0
Oglethorpe		–		4	–	5	–	0
Texas Mines		–		3	–	5	–	1
West Virginia		–		3	–	5	–	2
Delaware		–		2	–	4	–	2
Dixie (TX)		–		2	–	4	–	0
Georgetown		–		1	–	6	–	1
Jacksonville State		–		1	–	4	–	1
East Carolina		–		1	–	5	–	0
Wake Forest		–		0	–	5	–	1

The 1933 Dixie Rebels football team was an American football team that represented Dixie University (affiliated with Somerville School of Law) during the 1933 college football season. In its first season of intercollegiate football, albeit with a mostly veteran team from the 1932 Jefferson Rangers football team, Dixie compiled a 2–4 record with victories over Abilene Christian and Austin, though they scored just one touchdown in each win. In what was considered a benchmark game, Dixie traveled to Lubbock, Texas to play Texas Tech and was trounced 33–0. The head coach of Dixie was Nick Dobbs, and was assisted by Jim Hamrick, the captain of the 1932 Jefferson Rangers. The team captain was star running back Jodie Whire, formerly at the University of Georgia, but he left the team and the school at the end of September and was succeeded by Jake "Rabbit" Minnehan as the captain. On October 27, Dobbs resigned prior to the season finale and was replaced by Hamrick. The Rebels finished with a close loss to North Dakota at Fair Park Stadium.

Dixie University was created by Nick Dobbs in collaboration with the Somerville Law School executives as a new college to transplant his football team-without-a-home Rangers. After Jefferson University kicked the team out of that university, Dobbs proclaimed “What is wrong with a ready-made football team getting itself a university?” And with that Dixie was born to house the football team and apparently some college curricula. But the excitement that Dobbs created in 1932 had vanished almost as fast and his 1933 Rebels started to fall apart.

== Schedule ==
Date	Opponent	Site	Result	Attendance	Source
September 16	Abilene Christian	Steer Stadium; Dallas, TX	W 6-0	950	
September 22	Simmons (TX)	Steer Stadium; Dallas, TX	L 6–17	1,200	
September 30	Austin	Steer Stadium; Dallas, TX	W 6–2	400	
October 6	at Texas Tech	Tech Field; Lubbock, TX	L 0–33		
October 21	at Sul Ross	Jackson Field; Alpine, TX	L 0–5		
November 15	North Dakota	Fair Park Stadium; Dallas, TX	L 12–13	250	
