= 1933 Georgetown Hoyas football team =

American college football season

1933 Georgetown Hoyas football
- Conference: Independent
- Record: 1–6–1
- Head coach: Jack Hagerty (2nd season)
- Captain: Fred Callahan
- Home stadium: Griffith Stadium

1933 Southern college football independents records
	Conf.			Overall
Team	W	L	T	W		L		T
Oklahoma City		–		8	–	1	–	0
Tulsa		–		6	–	1	–	0
Troy State		–		5	–	1	–	0
Texas A&I		–		6	–	2	–	0
Catholic University		–		6	–	3	–	0
South Georgia Teachers		–		5	–	3	–	0
Western Maryland		–		5	–	3	–	0
William & Mary Norfolk		–		5	–	3	–	1
George Washington		–		5	–	3	–	1
Navy		–		5	–	4	–	0
Oglethorpe		–		4	–	5	–	0
Texas Mines		–		3	–	5	–	1
West Virginia		–		3	–	5	–	2
Delaware		–		2	–	4	–	2
Dixie (TX)		–		2	–	4	–	0
Georgetown		–		1	–	6	–	1
Jacksonville State		–		1	–	4	–	1
East Carolina		–		1	–	5	–	0
Wake Forest		–		0	–	5	–	1

The 1933 Georgetown Hoyas football team was an American football team that represented Georgetown University as an independent during the 1933 college football season. In their second season under head coach Jack Hagerty, the Hoyas compiled a 1–6–1 record and were outscored by a total of 130 to 56. The team played its home games at Griffith Stadium in Washington, D.C.

== Schedule ==
Date	Time	Opponent	Site	Result	Attendance	Source
September 30		Mount St. Mary's	Western High School Stadium; Washington, DC	W 18–0		
October 7		at Canisius	Buffalo, NY	L 0–6		
October 14		at Manhattan	Ebbets Field; Brooklyn, NY	T 20–20	18,000	
October 21		vs. Western Maryland	Baltimore Stadium; Baltimore, MD	L 0–20		
October 28		William & Mary	Griffith Stadium; Washington, DC	L 6–12		
November 4	2:00 p.m.	at Boston College	Alumni Field; Boston, MA	L 0–39		
November 18		Carnegie Tech	Griffith Stadium; Washington, DC	L 0–19		
November 25		West Virginia	Griffith Stadium; Washington, DC	L 12–14		
All times are in Eastern time
