= 1933 Catholic University Cardinals football team =

American college football season

1933 Catholic University Cardinals football
- Conference: Independent
- Record: 6–3
- Head coach: Dutch Bergman (4th season)
- Home stadium: Brookland Stadium, Griffith Stadium

1933 Southern college football independents records
	Conf.			Overall
Team	W	L	T	W		L		T
Oklahoma City		–		8	–	1	–	0
Tulsa		–		6	–	1	–	0
Troy State		–		5	–	1	–	0
Texas A&I		–		6	–	2	–	0
Catholic University		–		6	–	3	–	0
South Georgia Teachers		–		5	–	3	–	0
Western Maryland		–		5	–	3	–	0
William & Mary Norfolk		–		5	–	3	–	1
George Washington		–		5	–	3	–	1
Navy		–		5	–	4	–	0
Oglethorpe		–		4	–	5	–	0
Texas Mines		–		3	–	5	–	1
West Virginia		–		3	–	5	–	2
Delaware		–		2	–	4	–	2
Dixie (TX)		–		2	–	4	–	0
Georgetown		–		1	–	6	–	1
Jacksonville State		–		1	–	4	–	1
East Carolina		–		1	–	5	–	0
Wake Forest		–		0	–	5	–	1

The 1933 Catholic University Cardinals football team was an American football team that represented the Catholic University of America as an independent during the 1933 college football season. In its fourth year under head coach Dutch Bergman, the team compiled a 6–3 record and outscored opponents by a total of 193 to 65.

== Schedule ==
Date	Opponent	Site	Result	Attendance	Source
September 30	La Salle	Brookland Stadium; Washington, DC	W 37–6	8,000	
October 7	Holy Cross	Fitton Field; Worcester, MA	L 7–20		
October 14	St. John's	Washington, DC	W 24–0		
October 20	Chattanooga	Griffith Stadium; Washington, DC	W 25–0	10,000	
October 28	at Wake Forest	Gore Field; Wake Forest, NC	W 12–0		
November 3	Loyola (MD)	Washington, DC	W 61–0		
November 11	Detroit	Griffith Stadium; Washington, DC	L 0–26	< 5,000	
November 18	at Manhattan	Ebbets Field; Brooklyn, NY	L 0–7		
November 24	South Dakota State	Washington, DC	W 27–6		
