= 1935 Davidson Wildcats football team =

American college football season

1935 Davidson Wildcats football
- Conference: Independent
- Record: 4–3–2
- Head coach: Williams Newton (4th season)
- Home stadium: Richardson Field

1935 Southern college football independents records
	Conf.			Overall
Team	W	L	T	W		L		T
Catholic University		–		8	–	1	–	0
William & Mary Norfolk		–		8	–	1	–	0
Texas Wesleyan		–		8	–	2	–	1
George Washington		–		6	–	3	–	0
Hardin–Simmons		–		6	–	3	–	1
Navy		–		5	–	4	–	0
Western Maryland		–		6	–	5	–	0
East Carolina		–		3	–	3	–	0
Georgetown		–		4	–	4	–	0
Troy State		–		5	–	5	–	0
South Georgia Teachers		–		3	–	3	–	2
West Virginia		–		3	–	4	–	2
Oklahoma City		–		3	–	4	–	1
Texas A&I		–		3	–	5	–	0
Delaware		–		2	–	5	–	1
Jacksonville State		–		2	–	5	–	0
Wake Forest		–		2	–	7	–	0
Oglethorpe		–		1	–	8	–	0

The 1935 Davidson Wildcats football team was an American football team that represented Davidson College as an independent during the 1935 college football season. In their fourth year under head coach Williams Newton, the team compiled a 4–3–2 record.

== Schedule ==
Date	Opponent	Site	Result	Attendance	Source
September 21	Elon	Richardson Field; Davidson, NC	W 7–0	3,000	
September 28	vs. NC State	World War Memorial Stadium; Greensboro, NC	L 7–14	10,000	
October 5	at Virginia	Scott Stadium; Charlottesville, VA	T 0–0	5,000	
October 12	South Carolina	Richardson Field; Davidson, NC	W 13–6		
October 19	North Carolina	Richardson Field; Davidson, NC	L 0–14	7,500	
October 26	The Citadel	Richardson Field; Davidson, NC	T 7–7		
November 9	Duke^{†}	Richardson Field; Davidson, NC	L 7–26	7,000	
November 16	at VMI	Alumni Field; Lexington, VA	W 14–6		
November 28	at Wake Forest	Gore Field; Wake Forest, NC	W 14–7	8,000	
^{†}Homecoming
