= 1935 Roanoke Maroons football team =

American college football season

1935 Roanoke Maroons football
- Conference: Virginia Conference
- Record: 4–5 (1–2 Virginia)
- Head coach: Gordon C. White (6th season)
- Home stadium: College Field

The 1935 Roanoke Maroons football team represented Roanoke College as a member of the Virginia Conference during the 1935 college football season. Led by sixth-year head coach Gordon C. White, the Maroons compiled an overall record of 4–5.

== Schedule ==
| Date | Opponent | Site | Result | Attendance | Source |
|---|---|---|---|---|---|
| September 21 | at VPI* | Miles Stadium; Blacksburg, VA | L 0–7 | 4,000 | |
| September 28 | at Langley Field* | Langley Field Gridiron; Hampton, VA | W 25–6 | | |
| October 5 | Richmond | College Field; Salem, VA | L 7–12 | | |
| October 12 | at Georgetown* | Griffith Stadium; Washington, DC | L 0–16 | | |
| October 19 | vs. Elon* | Trucker Stadium; Portsmouth, VA | L 0–12 | | |
| October 26 | at William & Mary | Cary Field; Williamsburg, VA | L 7–14 | | |
| November 8 | at King* | Tenneva Field; Bristol, VA | W 41–7 | | |
| November 15 | Guilford* | College Field; Salem, VA | W 28–0 | | |
| November 23 | Emory and Henry^{†} | College Field; Salem, VA | W 14–0 | 1,000 | |
*Non-conference game; ^{†}Homecoming
