= Don McCallister =

American football player and coach (1904–1977)

Biographical details
- Born: March 13, 1904; Illinois, U.S.
- Died: August 5, 1977 (aged 73); San Gabriel, California, U.S.

Playing career
- 1925: Illinois

Coaching career (HC unless noted)
- 1926–1927: Palatka HS (FL)
- 1928–1930: Miami HS (FL)
- 1931–1934: Toledo Waite HS (OH)
- 1935–1937: South Carolina
- 1938–1941: Norwich

Administrative career (AD unless noted)
- 1935–1937: South Carolina
- 1938–1941: Norwich

Head coaching record
- Overall: 32–29–2 (college)

Accomplishments and honors

Championships
- High School National (1932)

Donald McCallister (March 13, 1904 – August 5, 1977) was an American football player and coach. He served as the head football coach at South Carolina University from 1935 to 1937 and at Norwich University in Northfield, Vermont from 1938 to 1941, compiling a career college football coaching record of 32–29–2. As a high school coach at Waite High School in Toledo, Ohio, McCallister's 1932 squad won a mythical High School Football National Championship.

McCallister died on August 5, 1977, as San Gabriel Community Hospital in San Gabriel, California.

== Head coaching record ==
=== College ===
Year	Team	Overall	Conference	Standing	Bowl/playoffs
South Carolina Gamecocks (Southern Conference) (1935–1937)
1935	South Carolina	3–7	1–4	T–8th	
1936	South Carolina	5–7	2–5	12th	
1937	South Carolina	5–6–1	2–2–1	7th	
South Carolina:		12–20–1	5–11–1		
Norwich Cadets (Independent) (1938–1941)
1938	Norwich	2–4			
1939	Norwich	5–2–1			
1940	Norwich	7–1			
1941	Norwich	6–2			
South Carolina:		20–9–1			
Total:		32–29–2			
