= 1935 VMI Keydets football team =

American college football season

1935 VMI Keydets football
- Conference: Southern Conference
- Record: 2–7–1 (0–3–1 SoCon)
- Head coach: W. C. Raftery (9th season)
- Home stadium: Alumni Field

1935 Southern Conference football standings
	Conf.					Overall
Team	W		L		T	W		L		T
No. 13 Duke $	5	–	0	–	0	8	–	2	–	0
No. 12 North Carolina	4	–	1	–	0	8	–	1	–	0
Maryland	3	–	1	–	1	7	–	2	–	2
Clemson	2	–	1	–	0	6	–	3	–	0
VPI	3	–	3	–	1	4	–	3	–	2
NC State	2	–	2	–	0	6	–	4	–	0
Washington and Lee	1	–	3	–	1	3	–	4	–	1
Virginia	0	–	3	–	2	1	–	5	–	4
South Carolina	1	–	4	–	0	3	–	7	–	0
VMI	0	–	3	–	1	2	–	7	–	1
$ – Conference champion; Rankings from United Press

The 1935 VMI Keydets football team was an American football team that represented the Virginia Military Institute (VMI) during the 1935 college football season as a member of the Southern Conference. In their ninth year under head coach W. C. Raftery, the team compiled an overall record of 2–7–1.

== Schedule ==
Date	Opponent	Site	Result	Attendance	Source
September 21	vs. Hampden–Sydney*	Lynchburg, VA	W 26–0		
September 28	at Tulane*	Tulane Stadium; New Orleans, LA	L 0–44	15,000	
October 5	at Columbia*	Baker Field; New York, NY	L 0–12		
October 12	Richmond*	Alumni Field; Lexington, VA (rivalry)	L 6–13	5,000	
October 19	Maryland	Alumni Field; Lexington, VA	L 0–6		
October 26	at Virginia	Scott Stadium; Charlottesville, VA	T 0–0	8,000	
November 2	at William & Mary*	Cary Field; Williamsburg, VA (rivalry)	W 19–0		
November 9	at North Carolina	Kenan Memorial Stadium; Chapel Hill, NC	L 0–56	7,000	
November 16	Davidson*	Alumni Field; Lexington, VA	L 6–14		
November 28	vs. VPI	Maher Field; Roanoke, VA (rivalry)	L 6–12	12,000	
*Non-conference game
