= 1935 William & Mary Norfolk Division Braves football team =

American college football season

1935 William & Mary Norfolk Division Braves football
- Conference: Independent
- Record: 8–1
- Head coach: Tommy Scott (6th season)
- Home stadium: Bain Field, Trucker Stadium

1935 Southern college football independents records
	Conf.			Overall
Team	W	L	T	W		L		T
Catholic University		–		8	–	1	–	0
William & Mary Norfolk		–		8	–	1	–	0
Texas Wesleyan		–		8	–	2	–	1
George Washington		–		6	–	3	–	0
Hardin–Simmons		–		6	–	3	–	1
Navy		–		5	–	4	–	0
Western Maryland		–		6	–	5	–	0
East Carolina		–		3	–	3	–	0
Georgetown		–		4	–	4	–	0
Troy State		–		5	–	5	–	0
South Georgia Teachers		–		3	–	3	–	2
West Virginia		–		3	–	4	–	2
Oklahoma City		–		3	–	4	–	1
Texas A&I		–		3	–	5	–	0
Delaware		–		2	–	5	–	1
Jacksonville State		–		2	–	5	–	0
Wake Forest		–		2	–	7	–	0
Oglethorpe		–		1	–	8	–	0

The 1935 William & Mary Norfolk Division Braves football team represented the Norfolk Division of the College of William & Mary, now referred to as Old Dominion University, during the 1935 college football season. They finished with an 8–1 record, and outscored their opponents 171–38.

== Schedule ==
Date	Time	Opponent	Site	Result	Attendance	Source
September 28		at Norfolk NAS	Naval Base; Norfolk, VA	W 13–10	3,500	
October 5		Louisburg	Larchmont; Norfolk, VA	W 14–0		
October 12		at Potomac State	Keyser, WV	W 13–7		
October 19		South Norfolk High School (VA)	Cascade Park; Norfolk, VA	W 33–0	500	
October 26		Gallaudet	Bain Field; Norfolk, VA	W 32–0		
November 9	2:30 p.m.	William & Mary freshmen	Bain Field; Norfolk, VA	W 7–4		
November 15	2:30 p.m.	East Carolina	Trucker Stadium; Portsmouth, VA	L 6–10		
November 22		at Hopewell High School (VA)	Hopewell, VA	W 34–0		
December 7	2:00 p.m.	at Norfolk NAS	Naval Base Stadium; Norfolk, VA	W 21–7	2,500	
All times are in Eastern time
