= Thomas Dowler =

American football and basketball coach (1908–1986)

Biographical details
- Born: July 3, 1908; Erie, Pennsylvania, U.S.
- Died: December 6, 1986 (aged 78); Fulton County, Georgia, U.S.

Playing career

Football
- 1927–1929: Colgate
- 1931: Brooklyn Dodgers

Basketball
- 1928–1931: Colgate

Baseball
- 1930: Colgate
- Position: Quarterback (football)

Coaching career (HC unless noted)

Football
- 1931: Colgate (assistant)
- 1935: William & Mary
- 1939–1940: Akron

Basketball
- 1934–1937: William & Mary
- 1939–1940: Akron

Head coaching record
- Overall: 10–13–5 (football); 30–43 (basketball)

Thomas Moran "Spook" Dowler (July 3, 1908 – December 6, 1986) was an American football, basketball, and baseball player and coach of football and basketball. He served as the head football coach at The College of William & Mary in 1935 and at the University of Akron in 1939 and 1940, compiling a career college football record of 10–13–5. Dowler also coached the William & Mary men's basketball team from 1934 to 1937 and the Akron Zips men's basketball team in 1939–40, tallying a career college basketball mark of 30–43. Dowler played football, basketball, and baseball at Colgate University. He played with the Brooklyn Dodgers in the National Football League (NFL) for two games in 1931.

== Coaching career ==
William & Mary had not yet joined an athletic conference during Dowler's first two seasons as head basketball coach, but for his third and final season, the Tribe had become a member of the Southern Conference. Dowler holds the dubious distinction of being the only men's basketball coach in school history to guide his team to a winless season. The Tribe went 0–13 in conference play and 0–18 overall during the 1936–37 season. Dowler went 21–29 over his three years at William & Mary. He finished his one-year stint as basketball coach at Akron with a 9–14 record.

== Later life and death ==
Dowler served in the United States Navy as a lieutenant during World War II. He later resided in Atlanta and died on December 6, 1986.

== Head coaching record ==
=== Football ===
Year	Team	Overall	Conference	Standing	Bowl/playoffs
William & Mary Indians (Virginia Conference) (1935)
1935	William & Mary	3–4–3	2–0–1	1st	
William & Mary:		3–4–3	2–0–1		
Akron Zippers (Independent) (1939–1940)
1939	Akron	5–4			
1940	Akron	2–5–2			
Akron:		7–9–2			
Total:		10–13–5			
National championship Conference title Conference division title or championship game berth
