= 1935 Richmond Spiders football team =

American college football season

1935 Richmond Spiders football
- Conference: Virginia Conference
- Record: 3–3–3 (1–1–1 Virginia)
- Head coach: Glenn Thistlethwaite (2nd season)
- Captains: George Byron Lacy; Edward M. Schaaf Jr.
- Home stadium: City Stadium

The 1935 Richmond Spiders football team was an American football team that represented the University of Richmond as a member of the Virginia Conference during the 1935 college football season. In their second season under head coach Glenn Thistlethwaite, Richmond compiled a 3–3–3 record.

== Schedule ==
Date	Opponent	Site	Result	Attendance	Source
September 28	Randolph–Macon*	City Stadium; Richmond, VA	T 6–6		
October 5	at Roanoke	College Field; Salem, VA	W 12–7		
October 12	at VMI*	Alumni Field; Lexington, VA (rivalry)	W 13–6	5,000	
October 19	Emory and Henry	City Stadium; Richmond, VA	L 6–14	5,000	
October 26	Franklin & Marshall*	City Stadium; Richmond, VA	L 6–6	5,000	
November 2	Georgetown*	City Stadium; Richmond, VA	L 0–7	4,000	
November 9	Hampden–Sydney*	City Stadium; Richmond, VA	W 15–7		
November 16	NC State*	City Stadium; Richmond, VA	L 0–6		
November 28	William & Mary	City Stadium; Richmond, VA (rivalry)	T 6–6	12,000	
*Non-conference game
