= 1935 Wake Forest Demon Deacons football team =

American college football season

1935 Wake Forest Demon Deacons football
- Conference: Independent
- Record: 2–7
- Head coach: Jim Weaver (3rd season)
- Captain: Perk Reinhardt
- Home stadium: Gore Field

1935 Southern college football independents records
	Conf.			Overall
Team	W	L	T	W		L		T
Catholic University		–		8	–	1	–	0
William & Mary Norfolk		–		8	–	1	–	0
Texas Wesleyan		–		8	–	2	–	1
George Washington		–		6	–	3	–	0
Hardin–Simmons		–		6	–	3	–	1
Navy		–		5	–	4	–	0
Western Maryland		–		6	–	5	–	0
East Carolina		–		3	–	3	–	0
Georgetown		–		4	–	4	–	0
Troy State		–		5	–	5	–	0
South Georgia Teachers		–		3	–	3	–	2
West Virginia		–		3	–	4	–	2
Oklahoma City		–		3	–	4	–	1
Texas A&I		–		3	–	5	–	0
Delaware		–		2	–	5	–	1
Jacksonville State		–		2	–	5	–	0
Wake Forest		–		2	–	7	–	0
Oglethorpe		–		1	–	8	–	0

The 1935 Wake Forest Demon Deacons football team was an American football team that represented Wake Forest College (now known as Wake Forest University) during the 1935 college football season. In its third season under head coach Jim Weaver, the team compiled a 2–7 record.

== Schedule ==
Date	Time	Opponent	Site	Result	Attendance	Source
September 21		vs. Duke	World War Memorial Stadium; Greensboro, NC (rivalry)	L 7–26	13,000	
September 28		at North Carolina	Kenan Memorial Stadium; Chapel Hill, NC (rivalry)	L 0–14	8,000	
October 5		at Clemson	Riggs Field; Clemson, SC	L 7–13	3,500	
October 12		at NC State	Riddick Stadium; Raleigh, NC (rivalry)	L 6–21		
October 18	2:30 pm	vs. Furman	Central High School Stadium; Charlotte, NC	L 0–9		
October 26		George Washington	Gore Field; Wake Forest, NC	W 7–6	3,000	
November 1		Presbyterian	Gore Field; Wake Forest, NC	W 18–0	3,000	
November 15		at Miami (FL)	Miami Stadium; Miami, FL	L 0–3	3,000–3,500	
November 28		Davidson	Gore Field; Wake Forest, NC	L 7–14	8,000	
