= Bill Pierce (American football) =

American football player and coach (1909–1981)

Biographical details
- Born: September 6, 1909; Seibert, Colorado, U.S.
- Died: September 8, 1981 (aged 72); Victoria, Texas, U.S.

Playing career
- 1930–1932: Notre Dame
- Position: Guard

Coaching career (HC unless noted)
- 1933: St. Edward's (line)
- 1934: Austin (line)
- 1935: Austin
- 1936–1939: St. Edward's
- 1946: Stephen F. Austin
- 1947–1948: Austin

Head coaching record
- Overall: 28–45–4

Accomplishments and honors

Championships
- 2 Texas Conference (1935, 1939)

William Clarkson Pierce (September 6, 1909 – September 8, 1981) was an American college football player and coach. A Notre Dame player during his college years, he served as the head football coach at Stephen F. Austin State University, Austin College and St. Edward's University in Texas.

Pierce began his coaching career in 1933 at St. Edward's, when he was hired as line coach under head football coach Jack Chevigny. He moved to Austin College the following year to serve in the same capacity under Joseph B. Head.

Pierce was born on September 6, 1909, in Seibert, Colorado. He served in World War II and later worked for Kraft Foods. He retired in 1975 and moved from Champaign, Illinois to Victoria, Texas, where he died in a hospital on September 8, 1981. He was buried at Memory Gardens in Edna, Texas.

== Head coaching record ==
Year	Team	Overall	Conference	Standing	Bowl/playoffs
Austin Kangaroos (Texas Conference) (1935)
1935	Austin	7–2–2	4–0–2	1st	
St. Edward's Tigers / Crusaders (Texas Conference) (1936–1939)
1936	St. Edward's	1–5–1	1–4	7th	
1937	St. Edward's	2–8	1–5	8th	
1938	St. Edward's	7–3	4–2	T–2nd	
1939	St. Edward's	6–3	5–1	T–1st	
St. Edward's:		16–19–1	11–12		
Stephen F. Austin Lumberjacks (Lone Star Conference) (1946)
1946	Stephen F. Austin	1–9	0–5	6th	
Stephen F. Austin:		1–9	0–5		
Austin Kangaroos (Texas Conference) (1947–1948)
1947	Austin	2–6–1	2–3	T–4th	
1948	Austin	2–9	0–5	6th	
Austin:		11–17–3	6–8–2		
Total:		28–45–4			
National championship Conference title Conference division title or championship game berth
