= 1935 Virginia Cavaliers football team =

American college football season

1935 Virginia Cavaliers football
- Conference: Southern Conference
- Record: 1–5–4 (0–3–2 SoCon)
- Head coach: Gus Tebell (2nd season)
- Captain: John Leys
- Home stadium: Scott Stadium

1935 Southern Conference football standings
	Conf.					Overall
Team	W		L		T	W		L		T
No. 13 Duke $	5	–	0	–	0	8	–	2	–	0
No. 12 North Carolina	4	–	1	–	0	8	–	1	–	0
Maryland	3	–	1	–	1	7	–	2	–	2
Clemson	2	–	1	–	0	6	–	3	–	0
VPI	3	–	3	–	1	4	–	3	–	2
NC State	2	–	2	–	0	6	–	4	–	0
Washington and Lee	1	–	3	–	1	3	–	4	–	1
Virginia	0	–	3	–	2	1	–	5	–	4
South Carolina	1	–	4	–	0	3	–	7	–	0
VMI	0	–	3	–	1	2	–	7	–	1
$ – Conference champion; Rankings from United Press

The 1935 Virginia Cavaliers football team represented the University of Virginia during the 1935 college football season. The Cavaliers were led by second-year head coach Gus Tebell and played their home games at Scott Stadium in Charlottesville, Virginia. They competed as members of the Southern Conference, finishing with a conference record of 0–3–2 and a 1–5–4 record overall.

== Schedule ==
Date	Opponent	Site	Result	Attendance	Source
September 21	at William & Mary*	Cary Field; Williamsburg, VA	T 0–0	6,000	
September 28	Hampden–Sydney*	Scott Stadium; Charlottesville, VA	L 7–12	4,000	
October 5	Davidson*	Scott Stadium; Charlottesville, VA	T 0–0		
October 10	at Navy*	Thompson Stadium; Annapolis, MD	L 7–26	15,200	
October 19	St. John's (MD)*	Scott Stadium; Charlottesville, VA	W 18–0		
October 26	VMI^{†}	Scott Stadium; Charlottesville, VA	T 0–0		
November 2	Maryland	Scott Stadium; Charlottesville, VA (rivalry)	L 7–14	5,000	
November 9	at Washington and Lee	Wilson Field; Lexington, VA	L 0–20		
November 16	VPI	Scott Stadium; Charlottesville, VA (rivalry)	T 0–0	3,000	
November 28	at North Carolina	Kenan Memorial Stadium; Chapel Hill, NC (rivalry)	L 0–61	14,000	
*Non-conference game; ^{†}Homecoming
