= 1935 Jacksonville State Eagle Owls football team =

American college football season

1935 Jacksonville State Eagle Owls football
- Conference: Independent
- Record: 2–4
- Head coach: T. B. Shotts (5th season)
- Home stadium: College Field

1935 Southern college football independents records
	Conf.			Overall
Team	W	L	T	W		L		T
Catholic University		–		8	–	1	–	0
William & Mary Norfolk		–		8	–	1	–	0
Texas Wesleyan		–		8	–	2	–	1
George Washington		–		6	–	3	–	0
Hardin–Simmons		–		6	–	3	–	1
Navy		–		5	–	4	–	0
Western Maryland		–		6	–	5	–	0
East Carolina		–		3	–	3	–	0
Georgetown		–		4	–	4	–	0
Troy State		–		5	–	5	–	0
South Georgia Teachers		–		3	–	3	–	2
West Virginia		–		3	–	4	–	2
Oklahoma City		–		3	–	4	–	1
Texas A&I		–		3	–	5	–	0
Delaware		–		2	–	5	–	1
Jacksonville State		–		2	–	5	–	0
Wake Forest		–		2	–	7	–	0
Oglethorpe		–		1	–	8	–	0

The 1935 Jacksonville State Eagle Owls football team represented Jacksonville State Teachers College (now known as Jacksonville State University) as an independent during the 1935 college football season. Led by fifth-year head coach T. B. Shotts, the Eagle Owls compiled an overall record of 2–4.

== Schedule ==
Date	Opponent	Site	Result	Source
September 27	at Union (TN)	Athletic Field; Jackson, TN	L 0–24	
October 4	at Middle Tennessee State	Horace Jones Field; Murfreesboro, TN	L 0–20	
October 19	Marion	College Field; Jacksonville, AL	W 30–0	
November 2	Piedmont	College Field; Jacksonville, AL	W 12–6	
November 11	at Rollins	Tinker Field; Orlando, FL	L 6–18	
November 22	at Spring Hill	Dorn Stadium; Mobile, AL	L 6–25	
