= 1935 Austin Kangaroos football team =

American college football season

1935 Austin Kangaroos football

Texas Conference champion
- Conference: Texas Conference
- Record: 7–2–2 (4–0–2 Texas)
- Head coach: Bill Pierce (1st season)
- Captain: Talmadge Crook

1935 Texas Conference football standings
	Conf.					Overall
Team	W		L		T	W		L		T
Austin $	4	–	0	–	2	7	–	2	–	2
McMurry	4	–	2	–	0	6	–	3	–	0
Howard Payne	3	–	1	–	3	5	–	2	–	3
Trinity (TX)	2	–	2	–	1	4	–	3	–	1
Daniel Baker	2	–	3	–	1	4	–	5	–	2
Abilene Christian	1	–	4	–	1	1	–	6	–	3
Southwestern (TX)	1	–	4	–	1	1	–	8	–	1
St. Edward's	1	–	4	–	1	3	–	5	–	1
Hardin–Simmons *	2	–	0	–	0	6	–	3	–	1
$ – Conference champion; * – did not compete for championship

The 1935 Austin Kangaroos football team was an American football team represented Austin College as a member of the Texas Conference during the 1935 college football season. Led by Bill Pierce in his first season as head coach, the team compiled an overall record of 7–2–2 with a mark of 4–0–2 in conference play, winning the program's first and only Texas Conference championship. Talmadge Crook was the team's captain. Austin lost its first two games of the season, both on the road. The first came in Commerce, Texas, to East Texas State, who finished the season as co-champions of the Lone Star Conference. The second was a 60–0 rout in Dallas by SMU, who won the Southwest Conference title and was recognized as a national champion.

== Schedule ==
Date	Opponent	Site	Result	Attendance	Source
September 20	at East Texas State*	Commerce, TX	L 6–7		
September 28	at SMU*	Ownby Stadium; Dallas, TX	L 0–60		
October 4	McMurry		W 20–14		
October 11	Daniel Baker	Sherman, TX	W 13–6		
October 18	at Howard Payne	Brownwood, TX	T 0–0	4,000	
October 25	Texas Wesleyan*	Sherman, TX	W 12–3		
November 1	at Stephen F. Austin*	Nacogdoches, TX	W 23–12		
November 8	at Abilene Christian	Abilene, TX	T 6–6		
November 15	at St. Edward's	Austin, TX	W 26–7		
November 28	Trinity (TX)	Sherman, TX	W 13–0		
December 6	vs. Southeastern Oklahoma State*	Denison, TX	W 6–0		
*Non-conference game
