= 1935 Catholic University Cardinals football team =

American college football season

1935 Catholic University Cardinals football

Orange Bowl champion

Orange Bowl, W 20–19 vs. Ole Miss
- Conference: Independent
- Record: 8–1
- Head coach: Dutch Bergman (6th season)
- Captain: Ed Karpowich
- Home stadium: Brookland Stadium, Griffith Stadium

1935 Southern college football independents records
	Conf.			Overall
Team	W	L	T	W		L		T
Catholic University		–		8	–	1	–	0
William & Mary Norfolk		–		8	–	1	–	0
Texas Wesleyan		–		8	–	2	–	1
George Washington		–		6	–	3	–	0
Hardin–Simmons		–		6	–	3	–	1
Navy		–		5	–	4	–	0
Western Maryland		–		6	–	5	–	0
East Carolina		–		3	–	3	–	0
Georgetown		–		4	–	4	–	0
Troy State		–		5	–	5	–	0
South Georgia Teachers		–		3	–	3	–	2
West Virginia		–		3	–	4	–	2
Oklahoma City		–		3	–	4	–	1
Texas A&I		–		3	–	5	–	0
Delaware		–		2	–	5	–	1
Jacksonville State		–		2	–	5	–	0
Wake Forest		–		2	–	7	–	0
Oglethorpe		–		1	–	8	–	0

The 1935 Catholic University Cardinals football team represented the Catholic University of America during the 1935 college football season. The Cardinals were led by Dutch Bergman, compiled an 8–1 record, shut out three opponents, and outscored their opponents by a total of 140 to 53. The Cardinals were invited to the Orange Bowl, their first of two major bowl games, where they defeated Ole Miss, 20–19.

== Schedule ==
Date	Time	Opponent	Site	Result	Attendance	Source
October 5	2:30 p.m.	La Salle	Brookland Stadium; Washington, DC	W 41–7	4,500	
October 11	8:15 p.m.	at Duquesne	Forbes Field; Pittsburgh, PA	W 6–0	5,000	
October 19		Detroit	University of Detroit Stadium; Detroit, MI	W 13–7	> 15,000	
October 25	8:00 p.m.	St. Mary's (TX)	Griffith Stadium; Washington, DC	W 7–0		
November 2		at DePaul	Soldier Field; Chicago, IL	L 6–9	5,000	
November 9	2:00 p.m.	West Virginia Wesleyan	Griffith Stadium; Washington, DC	W 19–6		
November 16	2:00 p.m.	Western Maryland	Griffith Stadium; Washington, DC	W 20–6	6,000	
November 28	2:00 p.m.	NC State	Griffith Stadium; Washington, DC	W 8–0		
January 1, 1936		vs. Ole Miss	Miami Stadium; Miami, FL (Orange Bowl)	W 20–19	10,000	
All times are in Eastern time

== Freshman team schedule ==
Date	Opponent	Site	Result	Source
October 26	Staunton Military Academy	Staunton, VA	T 6–6	
