= 1935 West Virginia Mountaineers football team =

American college football season

1935 West Virginia Mountaineers football
- Conference: Independent
- Record: 3–4–2
- Head coach: Charles Tallman (2nd season)
- Captain: Joe Stydahar
- Home stadium: Mountaineer Field

1935 Southern college football independents records
	Conf.			Overall
Team	W	L	T	W		L		T
Catholic University		–		8	–	1	–	0
William & Mary Norfolk		–		8	–	1	–	0
Texas Wesleyan		–		8	–	2	–	1
George Washington		–		6	–	3	–	0
Hardin–Simmons		–		6	–	3	–	1
Navy		–		5	–	4	–	0
Western Maryland		–		6	–	5	–	0
East Carolina		–		3	–	3	–	0
Georgetown		–		4	–	4	–	0
Troy State		–		5	–	5	–	0
South Georgia Teachers		–		3	–	3	–	2
West Virginia		–		3	–	4	–	2
Oklahoma City		–		3	–	4	–	1
Texas A&I		–		3	–	5	–	0
Delaware		–		2	–	5	–	1
Jacksonville State		–		2	–	5	–	0
Wake Forest		–		2	–	7	–	0
Oglethorpe		–		1	–	8	–	0

The 1935 West Virginia Mountaineers football team was an American football that represented West Virginia University as an independent during the 1935 college football season. In its second season under head coach Charles Tallman, the team compiled a 3–4–2 record and outscored opponents by a total of 129 to 96. The team played its home games at Mountaineer Field in Mountaineer Field in Morgantown, West Virginia. Joe Stydahar was the team captain.

== Schedule ==
Date	Opponent	Site	Result	Attendance	Source
September 28	West Virginia Wesleyan	Mountaineer Field; Morgantown, WV	T 0–0	4,500	
October 5	at Davis & Elkins	Elkins, WV	W 20–0		
October 12	at Pittsburgh	Pitt Stadium; Pittsburgh, PA (rivalry)	L 6–24	20,000	
October 18	at George Washington	Griffith Stadium; Washington, DC	L 7–15		
October 26	Temple	Mountaineer Field; Morgantown, WV	L 6–19	12,000	
November 2	vs. Washington and Lee	Laidley Field; Charleston, WV	W 20–0	10,000	
November 16	Duquesne	Mountaineer Field; Morgantown, WV	L 0–19	8,000	
November 23	Washington & Jefferson	Mountaineer Field; Morgantown, WV	W 51–0		
November 28	at Loyola (LA)	Loyola University Stadium; New Orleans, LA	T 19–19	8,000	
