= 1935 Maryland Terrapins football team =

American college football season

1935 Maryland Terrapins football
- Conference: Southern Conference
- Record: 7–2–2 (3–1–1 SoCon)
- Head coach: Jack Faber (1st season)
- Home stadium: Byrd Stadium (original)

1935 Southern Conference football standings
	Conf.					Overall
Team	W		L		T	W		L		T
No. 13 Duke $	5	–	0	–	0	8	–	2	–	0
No. 12 North Carolina	4	–	1	–	0	8	–	1	–	0
Maryland	3	–	1	–	1	7	–	2	–	2
Clemson	2	–	1	–	0	6	–	3	–	0
VPI	3	–	3	–	1	4	–	3	–	2
NC State	2	–	2	–	0	6	–	4	–	0
Washington and Lee	1	–	3	–	1	3	–	4	–	1
Virginia	0	–	3	–	2	1	–	5	–	4
South Carolina	1	–	4	–	0	3	–	7	–	0
VMI	0	–	3	–	1	2	–	7	–	1
$ – Conference champion; Rankings from United Press

The 1935 Maryland Terrapins football team was an American football team that represented the University of Maryland in the Southern Conference (SoCon) during the 1935 college football season. In their first season under head coach Jack Faber, the Terrapins compiled a 7–2–2 record (3–1–1 in conference), finished third in the SoCon, and outscored their opponents by a total of 127 to 78.

The team played its home games at the original Byrd Stadium in College Park, Maryland, and at Baltimore Stadium in Baltimore.

== Schedule ==
Date	Opponent	Site	Result	Attendance	Source
September 28	St. John's (MD)*	Byrd Stadium; College Park, MD	W 39–6		
October 5	VPI	Baltimore Stadium; Baltimore, MD	W 7–0		
October 12	North Carolina	Baltimore Stadium; Baltimore, MD	L 0–33		
October 19	at VMI	Alumni Field; Lexington, VA	W 6–0		
October 26	at Florida*	Florida Field; Gainesville, FL	W 14–7		
November 2	at Virginia	Scott Stadium; Charlottesville, VA (rivalry)	W 14–7	5,000	
November 9	Indiana*	Baltimore Stadium; Baltimore, MD	L 7–13		
November 16	Washington and Lee	Byrd Stadium; College Park, MD	T 0–0	7,000	
November 23	at Georgetown*	Griffith Stadium; Washington, DC	W 12–6		
November 28	Syracuse*	Baltimore Stadium; Baltimore, MD	T 0–0	5,000	
December 7	Western Maryland*	Baltimore Stadium; Baltimore, MD	W 22–7	8,000	
*Non-conference game
