= 1935 Oglethorpe Stormy Petrels football team =

American college football season

1935 Oglethorpe Stormy Petrels football
- Conference: Independent
- Record: 1–8
- Head coach: John W. Patrick (2nd season)
- Home stadium: Hermance Stadium

1935 Southern college football independents records
	Conf.			Overall
Team	W	L	T	W		L		T
Catholic University		–		8	–	1	–	0
William & Mary Norfolk		–		8	–	1	–	0
Texas Wesleyan		–		8	–	2	–	1
George Washington		–		6	–	3	–	0
Hardin–Simmons		–		6	–	3	–	1
Navy		–		5	–	4	–	0
Western Maryland		–		6	–	5	–	0
East Carolina		–		3	–	3	–	0
Georgetown		–		4	–	4	–	0
Troy State		–		5	–	5	–	0
South Georgia Teachers		–		3	–	3	–	2
West Virginia		–		3	–	4	–	2
Oklahoma City		–		3	–	4	–	1
Texas A&I		–		3	–	5	–	0
Delaware		–		2	–	5	–	1
Jacksonville State		–		2	–	5	–	0
Wake Forest		–		2	–	7	–	0
Oglethorpe		–		1	–	8	–	0

The 1935 Oglethorpe Stormy Petrels football team was an American football team that represented Oglethorpe University as an independent during the 1935 college football season. In their second year under head coach John W. Patrick, the Stormy Petrels compiled a 1–8 record.

== Schedule ==
Date	Opponent	Site	Result	Attendance	Source
September 27	Newberry	Hermance Stadium; North Atlanta, GA	Cancelled		
October 4	at Ozarks (AR)	Clarksville, AR	L 0–27		
October 12	Stetson	Hermance Stadium; North Atlanta, GA	L 6–7		
October 18	at Chattanooga	Chamberlain Field; Chattanooga, TN	L 13–24		
October 26	Erskine	Hermance Stadium; North Atlanta, GA	L 0–3		
November 1	at Troy State	Pace Field; Troy, AL	W 12–7		
November 9	at Emory and Henry	H. E. Fox Stadium; Big Stone Gap, VA	L 0–28		
November 16	at Auburn	Drake Field; Auburn, AL	L 0–51	5,000	
November 28	at Mercer	Centennial Stadium; Macon, GA	L 0–19		
December 6	at Miami (FL)	Miami Stadium; Miami, FL	L 13–21	3,500	
