= 1935 South Carolina Gamecocks football team =

American college football season

1935 South Carolina Gamecocks football
- Conference: Southern Conference
- Record: 3–7 (1–4 SoCon)
- Head coach: Don McCallister (1st season)
- Captain: Clay Alexander
- Home stadium: Carolina Municipal Stadium

1935 Southern Conference football standings
	Conf.					Overall
Team	W		L		T	W		L		T
No. 13 Duke $	5	–	0	–	0	8	–	2	–	0
No. 12 North Carolina	4	–	1	–	0	8	–	1	–	0
Maryland	3	–	1	–	1	7	–	2	–	2
Clemson	2	–	1	–	0	6	–	3	–	0
VPI	3	–	3	–	1	4	–	3	–	2
NC State	2	–	2	–	0	6	–	4	–	0
Washington and Lee	1	–	3	–	1	3	–	4	–	1
Virginia	0	–	3	–	2	1	–	5	–	4
South Carolina	1	–	4	–	0	3	–	7	–	0
VMI	0	–	3	–	1	2	–	7	–	1
$ – Conference champion; Rankings from United Press

The 1935 South Carolina Gamecocks football team was an American football team that represented the University of South Carolina as a member of the Southern Conference (SoCon) during the 1935 college football season. In their first season under head coach Don McCallister, the Gamecocks compiled an overall record of 3–7 with a mark of 1–4 in conference play, tying for eighth place in the SoCon.

== Schedule ==
Date	Opponent	Site	Result	Attendance	Source
September 21	Erskine*	Carolina Municipal Stadium; Columbia, SC	W 33–0		
September 28	at Duke	Duke Stadium; Durham, NC	L 0–47	8,000	
October 5	NC State	Carolina Municipal Stadium; Columbia, SC	L 0–14	6,000	
October 12	at Davidson*	Richardson Stadium; Davidson, NC	L 6–13		
October 17	vs. The Citadel*	County Fairgrounds; Orangeburg, SC	W 25–0	6,000	
October 24	Clemson	State Fair Grounds; Columbia, SC (rivalry)	L 0–44	17,000	
November 2	at VPI	Miles Stadium; Blacksburg, VA	L 0–27	4,000	
November 16	Furman*	Carolina Municipal Stadium; Columbia, SC	L 7–20	3,500	
November 23	Washington and Lee	Carolina Municipal Stadium; Columbia, SC	W 2–0	4,000	
December 7	vs. Florida*	Plant Field; Tampa, FL	L 0–22	6,000	
*Non-conference game
