= 1935 Washington and Lee Generals football team =

American college football season

1935 Washington and Lee Generals football
- Conference: Southern Conference
- Record: 3–4–1 (1–3–1 SoCon)
- Head coach: Warren E. Tilson (3rd season)
- Home stadium: Wilson Field

1935 Southern Conference football standings
	Conf.					Overall
Team	W		L		T	W		L		T
No. 13 Duke $	5	–	0	–	0	8	–	2	–	0
No. 12 North Carolina	4	–	1	–	0	8	–	1	–	0
Maryland	3	–	1	–	1	7	–	2	–	2
Clemson	2	–	1	–	0	6	–	3	–	0
VPI	3	–	3	–	1	4	–	3	–	2
NC State	2	–	2	–	0	6	–	4	–	0
Washington and Lee	1	–	3	–	1	3	–	4	–	1
Virginia	0	–	3	–	2	1	–	5	–	4
South Carolina	1	–	4	–	0	3	–	7	–	0
VMI	0	–	3	–	1	2	–	7	–	1
$ – Conference champion; Rankings from United Press

The 1935 Washington and Lee Generals football team was an American football team that represented Washington and Lee University during the 1935 college football season as a member of the Southern Conference. In their third year under head coach Warren E. Tilson, the team compiled an overall record of 3–4–1, with a mark of 1–3–1 in conference play.

== Schedule ==
Date	Time	Opponent	Site	Result	Attendance	Source
September 28		Wofford*	Wilson Field; Lexington, VA	W 18–0		
October 5		vs. Duke	City Stadium; Richmond, VA	L 0–26	12,000	
October 19	3:00 p.m.	vs. Centre*	duPont Stadium; Louisville, KY	W 14–7	5,000	
October 26		vs. VPI	Municipal Stadium; Bluefield, WV	L 0–15	6,000	
November 2		vs. West Virginia*	Laidley Field; Charleston, WV	L 0–20	10,000	
November 9		Virginia^{†}	Wilson Field; Lexington, VA	W 20–0		
November 16		at Maryland	Byrd Stadium; College Park, MD	T 0–0	7,000	
November 23		at South Carolina	Carolina Municipal Stadium; Columbia, SC	L 0–2	4,000	
*Non-conference game; ^{†}Homecoming; All times are in Eastern time
