= 1935 Georgetown Hoyas football team =

American college football season

1935 Georgetown Hoyas football
- Conference: Independent
- Record: 4–4
- Head coach: Jack Hagerty (4th season)
- Captains: Walter Herron; Joe Meglen
- Home stadium: Griffith Stadium

1935 Southern college football independents records
| | Conf. | | | Overall |
| Team | W | L | T | W | | L | | T |
|---|---|---|---|---|---|---|---|---|
| Catholic University | | – | | 8 | – | 1 | – | 0 |
| William & Mary Norfolk | | – | | 8 | – | 1 | – | 0 |
| Texas Wesleyan | | – | | 8 | – | 2 | – | 1 |
| George Washington | | – | | 6 | – | 3 | – | 0 |
| Hardin–Simmons | | – | | 6 | – | 3 | – | 1 |
| Navy | | – | | 5 | – | 4 | – | 0 |
| Western Maryland | | – | | 6 | – | 5 | – | 0 |
| East Carolina | | – | | 3 | – | 3 | – | 0 |
| Georgetown | | – | | 4 | – | 4 | – | 0 |
| Troy State | | – | | 5 | – | 5 | – | 0 |
| South Georgia Teachers | | – | | 3 | – | 3 | – | 2 |
| West Virginia | | – | | 3 | – | 4 | – | 2 |
| Oklahoma City | | – | | 3 | – | 4 | – | 1 |
| Texas A&I | | – | | 3 | – | 5 | – | 0 |
| Delaware | | – | | 2 | – | 5 | – | 1 |
| Jacksonville State | | – | | 2 | – | 5 | – | 0 |
| Wake Forest | | – | | 2 | – | 7 | – | 0 |
| Oglethorpe | | – | | 1 | – | 8 | – | 0 |

The 1935 Georgetown Hoyas football team was an American football team that represented Georgetown University as an independent during the 1935 college football season. In their fourth season under head coach Jack Hagerty, the Hoyas compiled a 4–4 record and outscored opponents by a total of 71 to 40. The team played its home games at Griffith Stadium in Washington, D.C.

== Schedule ==
| Date | Opponent | Site | Result | Attendance | Source |
|---|---|---|---|---|---|
| October 4 | Albright | Griffith Stadium; Washington, DC | L 0–7 | 5,000 | |
| October 12 | Roanoke | Griffith Stadium; Washington, DC | W 16–0 | | |
| October 19 | Miami (FL) | Griffith Stadium; Washington, DC | W 13–0 | | |
| October 26 | at NYU | Yankee Stadium; Bronx, NY | L 6–7 | 20,000 | |
| November 2 | at Richmond | City Stadium; Richmond, VA | W 7–0 | 4,000 | |
| November 16 | at Manhattan | Ebbets Field; Brooklyn, NY | W 13–0 | 10,000 | |
| November 23 | Maryland | Griffith Stadium; Washington, DC | L 6–12 | | |
| November 30 | vs. Western Maryland | Baltimore Stadium; Baltimore, MD | L 10–14 | 5,000 | |
