= 1935 South Georgia Teachers Blue Tide football team =

American college football season

1935 South Georgia Teachers Blue Tide football
- Conference: Independent
- Record: 3–3–2
- Head coach: Crook Smith (7th season)

1935 Southern college football independents records
	Conf.			Overall
Team	W	L	T	W		L		T
Catholic University		–		8	–	1	–	0
William & Mary Norfolk		–		8	–	1	–	0
Texas Wesleyan		–		8	–	2	–	1
George Washington		–		6	–	3	–	0
Hardin–Simmons		–		6	–	3	–	1
Tennessee State		–		4	–	3	–	1
Navy		–		5	–	4	–	0
Western Maryland		–		6	–	5	–	0
East Carolina		–		3	–	3	–	0
Georgetown		–		4	–	4	–	0
Tampa		–		5	–	5	–	0
Troy State		–		5	–	5	–	0
South Georgia Teachers		–		3	–	3	–	2
West Virginia		–		3	–	4	–	2
Oklahoma City		–		3	–	4	–	1
Texas A&I		–		3	–	5	–	0
Delaware		–		2	–	5	–	1
Jacksonville State		–		2	–	5	–	0
Wake Forest		–		2	–	7	–	0
Oglethorpe		–		1	–	8	–	0

The 1935 South Georgia Teachers Blue Tide football team represented the South Georgia Teachers College—now known as Georgia Southern University—during the 1935 college football season. The team was led by Crook Smith in his seventh year as head coach.

== Schedule ==
Date	Time	Opponent	Site	Result	Attendance	Source
October 5		at Abraham Baldwin	Tifton, GA	W 13–0		
October 12	3:00 p.m.	South Georgia State	Statesboro, GA	T 14–14		
October 18	8:00 p.m.	at Tampa	Plant Field; Tampa, FL	L 0–19	5,000	
October 26		Troy State	Statesboro, GA	L 26–28		
November 1	3:30 p.m.	at Middle Georgia	Cochran, GA	W 14–7		
November 9		at Appalachian State	College Field; Boone, NC (rivalry)	T 0–0		
November 16		Middle Georgia	Statesboro, GA	W 25–12		
November 28		Stetson	Statesboro, GA	L 6–9		
All times are in Eastern time
