= 1935 Delaware Fightin' Blue Hens football team =

American college football season

1935 Delaware Fightin' Blue Hens football
- Conference: Independent
- Record: 2–5–1
- Head coach: Lyal Clark (1st season)
- Home stadium: Frazer Field

1935 Southern college football independents records
	Conf.			Overall
Team	W	L	T	W		L		T
Catholic University		–		8	–	1	–	0
William & Mary Norfolk		–		8	–	1	–	0
Texas Wesleyan		–		8	–	2	–	1
George Washington		–		6	–	3	–	0
Hardin–Simmons		–		6	–	3	–	1
Navy		–		5	–	4	–	0
Western Maryland		–		6	–	5	–	0
East Carolina		–		3	–	3	–	0
Georgetown		–		4	–	4	–	0
Troy State		–		5	–	5	–	0
South Georgia Teachers		–		3	–	3	–	2
West Virginia		–		3	–	4	–	2
Oklahoma City		–		3	–	4	–	1
Texas A&I		–		3	–	5	–	0
Delaware		–		2	–	5	–	1
Jacksonville State		–		2	–	5	–	0
Wake Forest		–		2	–	7	–	0
Oglethorpe		–		1	–	8	–	0

The 1935 Delaware Fightin' Blue Hens football team was an American football team that represented the University of Delaware in the 1935 college football season. In their first season under head coach Lyal Clark, the Blue Hens compiled a 2–5–1 record and were outscored by a total of 117 to 69. The team played its home games at Frazer Field in Newark, Delaware.

== Schedule ==
Date	Opponent	Site	Result	Attendance	Source
October 5	at Dickinson	Biddle Field; Carlisle, PA	W 10–7		
October 12	Mount St. Mary's	Frazer Field; Newark, DE	T 0–0	3,000	
October 19	Randolph–Macon	Frazer Field; Newark, DE	L 0–26		
October 26	Washington College	Frazer Field; Newark, DE	W 33–12		
November 2	Saint Joseph's	Frazer Field; Newark, DE	L 13–19	3,000	
November 9	vs. Pennsylvania Military	Municipal Auditorium; Atlantic City, NJ	L 6–7	20,000	
November 16	at Drexel	Drexel Field; Philadelphia, PA	L 7–34	3,000	
November 23	Lebanon Valley	Frazer Field; Newark, DE	L 0–18		
