= 1935 Navy Midshipmen football team =

American college football season

1935 Navy Midshipmen football
- Conference: Independent
- Record: 5–4
- Head coach: Tom Hamilton (2nd season)
- Captain: Louis Robertshaw
- Home stadium: Thompson Stadium

1935 Southern college football independents records
	Conf.			Overall
Team	W	L	T	W		L		T
Catholic University		–		8	–	1	–	0
William & Mary Norfolk		–		8	–	1	–	0
Texas Wesleyan		–		8	–	2	–	1
George Washington		–		6	–	3	–	0
Hardin–Simmons		–		6	–	3	–	1
Tennessee State		–		4	–	3	–	1
Navy		–		5	–	4	–	0
Western Maryland		–		6	–	5	–	0
East Carolina		–		3	–	3	–	0
Georgetown		–		4	–	4	–	0
Tampa		–		5	–	5	–	0
Troy State		–		5	–	5	–	0
South Georgia Teachers		–		3	–	3	–	2
West Virginia		–		3	–	4	–	2
Oklahoma City		–		3	–	4	–	1
Texas A&I		–		3	–	5	–	0
Delaware		–		2	–	5	–	1
Jacksonville State		–		2	–	5	–	0
Wake Forest		–		2	–	7	–	0
Oglethorpe		–		1	–	8	–	0

The 1935 Navy Midshipmen football team represented the United States Naval Academy during the 1935 college football season. In their second season under head coach Tom Hamilton, the Midshipmen compiled a 5–4 record and outscored their opponents by a combined score of 136 to 89.

== Schedule ==
Date	Opponent	Site	Result	Attendance	Source
September 28	William & Mary	Thompson Stadium; Annapolis, MD	W 30–0		
October 5	Mercer	Thompson Stadium; Annapolis, MD	W 27–0	8,130	
October 10	Virginia	Thompson Stadium; Annapolis, MD	W 26–7		
October 19	at Yale	Yale Bowl; New Haven, CT	L 6–7		
October 26	Notre Dame	Municipal Stadium; Baltimore, MD (rivalry)	L 0–14	57,810–65,000	
November 2	at Princeton	Palmer Stadium; Princeton, NJ	L 0–26		
November 9	at Penn	Franklin Field; Philadelphia, PA	W 13–0		
November 16	Columbia	Thompson Stadium; Annapolis, MD	W 28–7	15,000	
November 30	vs. Army	Franklin Field; Philadelphia, PA (Army–Navy Game)	L 6–28		
