= 1939 St. Edward's Crusaders football team =

American college football season

1939 St. Edward's Crusaders football

Texas Conference cochampion
- Conference: Texas Conference
- Record: 6–3 (5–1 Texas)
- Head coach: Bill Pierce (4th season)

1939 Texas Conference football standings
	Conf.					Overall
Team	W		L		T	W		L		T
Abilene Christian +	5	–	1	–	0	6	–	2	–	1
St. Edward's +	5	–	1	–	0	6	–	3	–	0
Trinity (TX)	4	–	1	–	2	6	–	3	–	2
Howard Payne	4	–	2	–	1	5	–	4	–	1
Texas Wesleyan	2	–	2	–	1	4	–	5	–	2
Southwestern (TX)	3	–	3	–	0	3	–	5	–	0
Daniel Baker	3	–	4	–	0	4	–	6	–	0
McMurry	1	–	6	–	0	1	–	6	–	0
Austin	0	–	7	–	0	0	–	10	–	0
+ – Conference co-champions

The 1939 St. Edward's Crusaders football team was an American football team that represented St. Edward's University as a member of the Texas Conference during 1933 college football season. Led by Bill Pierce in his fourth season as head coach, the team compiled a record of 6–3 overall with a mark of 5–1 in conference play, sharing the Texas Conference title with Abilene Christian. St. Edward's changed its fight name from the Tigers to the Crusaders prior to the season.

== Schedule ==
Date	Opponent	Site	Result	Attendance	Source
September 29	at Southwest Texas State*	San Marcos, TX	W 6–0		
October 7	at Southwestern (TX)	Georgetown, TX	W 13–0		
October 13	at Hardin–Simmons*	Abilene, TX	L 3–33		
October 21	Daniel Baker	Austin, TX	L 0–6	1,500	
October 26	McMurry	Austin, TX	W 15–0		
November 3	Texas Wesleyan	Austin, TX	W 16–7		
November 10	at Howard Payne	Brownwood, TX	W 7–0		
November 17	Austin	Austin, TX	W 19–0		
November 24	Texas A&I*	Austin, TX	L 6–26		
*Non-conference game
