= 1935 NC State Wolfpack football team =

American college football season

1935 NC State Wolfpack football
- Conference: Southern Conference
- Record: 6–4 (2–2 SoCon)
- Head coach: Hunk Anderson (2nd season)
- Home stadium: Riddick Stadium

1935 Southern Conference football standings
	Conf.					Overall
Team	W		L		T	W		L		T
No. 13 Duke $	5	–	0	–	0	8	–	2	–	0
No. 12 North Carolina	4	–	1	–	0	8	–	1	–	0
Maryland	3	–	1	–	1	7	–	2	–	2
Clemson	2	–	1	–	0	6	–	3	–	0
VPI	3	–	3	–	1	4	–	3	–	2
NC State	2	–	2	–	0	6	–	4	–	0
Washington and Lee	1	–	3	–	1	3	–	4	–	1
Virginia	0	–	3	–	2	1	–	5	–	4
South Carolina	1	–	4	–	0	3	–	7	–	0
VMI	0	–	3	–	1	2	–	7	–	1
$ – Conference champion; Rankings from United Press

The 1935 NC State Wolfpack football team was an American football team that represented North Carolina State University as a member of the Southern Conference (SoCon) during the 1935 college football season. In its second season under head coach Hunk Anderson, the team compiled a 6–4 record (2–2 against SoCon opponents) and outscored opponents by a total of 87 to 76.

== Schedule ==
Date	Time	Opponent	Site	Result	Attendance	Source
September 28		vs. Davidson*	World War Memorial Stadium; Greensboro, NC	W 14–7	10,000	
October 5		at South Carolina	Carolina Municipal Stadium; Columbia, SC	W 14–0	6,000	
October 12		Wake Forest*	Riddick Stadium; Raleigh, NC (rivalry)	W 21–6		
October 19		Georgia*	Riddick Stadium; Raleigh, NC	L 0–13	11,000	
October 26		at Manhattan*	Ebbets Field; Brooklyn, NY	W 20–0	17,000	
November 2		North Carolina	Riddick Stadium; Raleigh, NC (rivalry)	L 6–35	16,000	
November 9		vs. VPI	Trucker Stadium; Portsmouth, VA	W 6–0	5,000	
November 16		at Richmond*	City Stadium; Richmond, VA	W 6–0		
November 23		Duke	Riddick Stadium; Raleigh, NC (rivalry)	L 0–7	10,000	
November 28	2:00 p.m.	at Catholic University*	Griffith Stadium; Washington, DC	L 0–8		
*Non-conference game; All times are in Eastern time
