= 1935 North Carolina Tar Heels football team =

American college football season

1935 North Carolina Tar Heels football
- Conference: Southern Conference
- Record: 8–1 (4–1 SoCon)
- Head coach: Carl Snavely (2nd season)
- Captains: Herman Snyder; Harry Montgomery
- Home stadium: Kenan Memorial Stadium

1935 Southern Conference football standings
	Conf.					Overall
Team	W		L		T	W		L		T
No. 13 Duke $	5	–	0	–	0	8	–	2	–	0
No. 12 North Carolina	4	–	1	–	0	8	–	1	–	0
Maryland	3	–	1	–	1	7	–	2	–	2
Clemson	2	–	1	–	0	6	–	3	–	0
VPI	3	–	3	–	1	4	–	3	–	2
NC State	2	–	2	–	0	6	–	4	–	0
Washington and Lee	1	–	3	–	1	3	–	4	–	1
Virginia	0	–	3	–	2	1	–	5	–	4
South Carolina	1	–	4	–	0	3	–	7	–	0
VMI	0	–	3	–	1	2	–	7	–	1
$ – Conference champion; Rankings from United Press

The 1935 North Carolina Tar Heels football team represented the University of North Carolina at Chapel Hill during the 1935 college football season. The Tar Heels were led by second-year head coach Carl Snavely and played their home games at Kenan Memorial Stadium. They competed as a member of the Southern Conference. Snavely unexpectedly resigned at the end of the season to accept a head coaching position at Cornell University. He returned to coach the Tar Heels again from 1945 to 1952.

== Schedule ==
Date	Time	Opponent	Site	Result	Attendance	Source
September 28	2:30 p.m.	Wake Forest*	Kenan Memorial Stadium; Chapel Hill, NC (rivalry)	W 14–0	8,000	
October 5	2:00 p.m.	at Tennessee*	Shields–Watkins Field; Knoxville, TN	W 38–13	15,000	
October 12	2:30 p.m.	at Maryland	Municipal Stadium; Baltimore, MD	W 33–0	12,000	
October 19	2:30 p.m.	at Davidson*	Richardson Field; Davidson, NC	W 14–0	8,500	
October 26	2:00 p.m.	Georgia Tech*	Kenan Memorial Stadium; Chapel Hill, NC	W 19–0	20,000	
November 2	2:30 p.m.	at NC State	Riddick Stadium; Raleigh, NC (rivalry)	W 35–6	16,000	
November 9	2:00 p.m.	VMI	Kenan Memorial Stadium; Chapel Hill, NC	W 56–0	7,000	
November 16	2:00 p.m.	at Duke	Duke Stadium; Durham, NC (rivalry)	L 0–25	46,880	
November 28	2:00 p.m.	Virginia	Kenan Memorial Stadium; Chapel Hill, NC (South's Oldest Rivalry)	W 61–0	14,000	
*Non-conference game; All times are in Eastern time
