= 1935 Duke Blue Devils football team =

American college football season

1935 Duke Blue Devils football

SoCon champion
- Conference: Southern Conference
- Record: 8–2 (5–0 SoCon)
- Head coach: Wallace Wade (5th season)
- Offensive scheme: Single-wing
- MVP: Jack Hennemier
- Captain: James Johnston
- Home stadium: Duke Stadium

1935 Southern Conference football standings
| | Conf. | | | | | Overall |
| Team | W | | L | | T | W | | L | | T |
|---|---|---|---|---|---|---|---|---|---|---|
| No. 13 Duke $ | 5 | – | 0 | – | 0 | 8 | – | 2 | – | 0 |
| No. 12 North Carolina | 4 | – | 1 | – | 0 | 8 | – | 1 | – | 0 |
| Maryland | 3 | – | 1 | – | 1 | 7 | – | 2 | – | 2 |
| Clemson | 2 | – | 1 | – | 0 | 6 | – | 3 | – | 0 |
| VPI | 3 | – | 3 | – | 1 | 4 | – | 3 | – | 2 |
| NC State | 2 | – | 2 | – | 0 | 6 | – | 4 | – | 0 |
| Washington and Lee | 1 | – | 3 | – | 1 | 3 | – | 4 | – | 1 |
| Virginia | 0 | – | 3 | – | 2 | 1 | – | 5 | – | 4 |
| South Carolina | 1 | – | 4 | – | 0 | 3 | – | 7 | – | 0 |
| VMI | 0 | – | 3 | – | 1 | 2 | – | 7 | – | 1 |
$ – Conference champion; Rankings from United Press

The 1935 Duke Blue Devils football team was an American football team that represented Duke University as a member of the Southern Conference during the 1935 college football season. In its fifth season under head coach Wallace Wade, the team compiled an 8–2 record (5–0 against conference opponents), won the conference championship, and outscored opponents by a total of 214 to 45. James Johnston was the team captain. The team played its home games at Duke Stadium in Durham, North Carolina.

== Schedule ==
| Date | Opponent | Site | Result | Attendance | Source |
|---|---|---|---|---|---|
| September 21 | vs. Wake Forest* | World War Memorial Stadium; Greensboro, NC (rivalry) | W 26–7 | 13,000 | |
| September 28 | South Carolina | Duke Stadium; Durham, NC | W 47–0 | 8,000 | |
| October 5 | vs. Washington and Lee | City Stadium; Richmond, VA | W 26–0 | 12,000 | |
| October 12 | Clemson | Duke Stadium; Durham, NC | W 38–12 | 10,000 | |
| October 19 | at Georgia Tech* | Grant Field; Atlant, GA | L 0–6 | 12,000 | |
| October 25 | Auburn* | Duke Stadium; Durham, NC | L 0–7 | 8,000 | |
| November 2 | Tennessee*^{†} | Duke Stadium; Durham, NC | W 19–6 | 15,000 | |
| November 9 | at Davidson* | Richardson Field; Davidson, NC | W 26–7 | 7,000 | |
| November 16 | North Carolina | Duke Stadium; Durham, NC (Victory Bell) | W 25–0 | 46,880 | |
| November 23 | at NC State | Riddick Stadium; Raleigh, NC (rivalry) | W 7–0 | 10,000 | |
*Non-conference game; ^{†}Homecoming
