= 1935 Clemson Tigers football team =

American college football season

1935 Clemson Tigers football
- Conference: Southern Conference
- Record: 6–3 (2–1 SoCon)
- Head coach: Jess Neely (5th season)
- Captain: Henry Shore
- Home stadium: Riggs Field

1935 Southern Conference football standings
	Conf.					Overall
Team	W		L		T	W		L		T
No. 13 Duke $	5	–	0	–	0	8	–	2	–	0
No. 12 North Carolina	4	–	1	–	0	8	–	1	–	0
Maryland	3	–	1	–	1	7	–	2	–	2
Clemson	2	–	1	–	0	6	–	3	–	0
VPI	3	–	3	–	1	4	–	3	–	2
NC State	2	–	2	–	0	6	–	4	–	0
Washington and Lee	1	–	3	–	1	3	–	4	–	1
Virginia	0	–	3	–	2	1	–	5	–	4
South Carolina	1	–	4	–	0	3	–	7	–	0
VMI	0	–	3	–	1	2	–	7	–	1
$ – Conference champion; Rankings from United Press

The 1935 Clemson Tigers football team was an American football team that represented Clemson College in the Southern Conference during the 1935 college football season. In their fifth season under head coach Jess Neely, the Tigers compiled a 6–3 record (2–1 against conference opponents), finished fourth in the conference, and outscored opponents by a total of 147 to 99.

Henry Shore was the team captain. The team's statistical leaders included tailback Joe Berry with 422 passing yards and 457 rushing yards and fullback Mac Folger with 36 points scored (6 touchdowns).

Two Clemson players were selected as first-team players on the 1937 All-Southern Conference football team: tackle Tom Brown and guard Clarence Inabinet.

== Schedule ==
Date	Opponent	Site	Result	Attendance	Source
September 21	Presbyterian*	Riggs Field; Clemson, SC	W 25–6		
September 28	at VPI	Miles Stadium; Blacksburg, VA	W 28–7		
October 5	Wake Forest*^{†}	Riggs Field; Clemson, SC	W 13–7	3,500	
October 12	at Duke	Duke Stadium; Durham, NC	L 12–38	10,000	
October 24	at South Carolina	State Fair Grounds; Columbia, SC (rivalry)	W 44–0	17,000	
November 2	vs. Mercer*	Augusta, GA	W 13–0	3,000	
November 9	at Alabama*	Denny Stadium; Tuscaloosa, AL (rivalry)	L 0–33	8,000	
November 16	at The Citadel*	Johnson Hagood Stadium; Charleston, SC	W 6–0	3,000	
November 28	at Furman*	Manly Field; Greenville, SC	L 6–8		
*Non-conference game; ^{†}Homecoming
