= 1935 George Washington Colonials football team =

American college football season

1935 George Washington Colonials football
- Conference: Independent
- Record: 6–3
- Head coach: Jim Pixlee (7th season)
- Home stadium: Griffith Stadium

1935 Southern college football independents records
	Conf.			Overall
Team	W	L	T	W		L		T
Catholic University		–		8	–	1	–	0
William & Mary Norfolk		–		8	–	1	–	0
Texas Wesleyan		–		8	–	2	–	1
George Washington		–		6	–	3	–	0
Hardin–Simmons		–		6	–	3	–	1
Navy		–		5	–	4	–	0
Western Maryland		–		6	–	5	–	0
East Carolina		–		3	–	3	–	0
Georgetown		–		4	–	4	–	0
Troy State		–		5	–	5	–	0
South Georgia Teachers		–		3	–	3	–	2
West Virginia		–		3	–	4	–	2
Oklahoma City		–		3	–	4	–	1
Texas A&I		–		3	–	5	–	0
Delaware		–		2	–	5	–	1
Jacksonville State		–		2	–	5	–	0
Wake Forest		–		2	–	7	–	0
Oglethorpe		–		1	–	8	–	0

The 1935 George Washington Colonials football team was an American football team that represented George Washington University as an independent during the 1935 college football season. In its seventh season under head coach Jim Pixlee, the team compiled a 6–3 record and outscored opponents by a total of 141 to 101. The team defeated North Dakota, West Virginia, and Tulsa, and lost to Alabama, Wake Forest, and Rice.

== Schedule ==
Date	Time	Opponent	Site	Result	Attendance	Source
September 28		Emory & Henry	Griffith Stadium; Washington, DC	W 12–0	9,000	
October 5	2:30 p.m.	Alabama	Griffith Stadium; Washington, DC	L 0–39	30,000	
October 11		Catawba	Griffith Stadium; Washington, DC	W 33–0		
October 18		West Virginia	Griffith Stadium; Washington, DC	W 15–7		
October 26		at Wake Forest	Gore Field; Wake Forest, NC	L 6–7	3,000	
November 2		Rice	Griffith Stadium; Washington, DC	L 6–41	15,000	
November 8		Davis & Elkins	Griffith Stadium; Washington, DC	W 53–7	7,000	
November 15		Tulsa	Griffith Stadium; Washington, DC	W 3–0	12,000	
November 28		North Dakota	Griffith Stadium; Washington, DC	W 13–0		
All times are in Eastern time
