= 1935 VPI Gobblers football team =

American college football season

1935 VPI Gobblers football
- Conference: Southern Conference
- Record: 4–3–2 (3–3–1 SoCon)
- Head coach: Henry Redd (4th season)
- Captain: Louis L. Fittro
- Home stadium: Miles Stadium

1935 Southern Conference football standings
	Conf.					Overall
Team	W		L		T	W		L		T
No. 13 Duke $	5	–	0	–	0	8	–	2	–	0
No. 12 North Carolina	4	–	1	–	0	8	–	1	–	0
Maryland	3	–	1	–	1	7	–	2	–	2
Clemson	2	–	1	–	0	6	–	3	–	0
VPI	3	–	3	–	1	4	–	3	–	2
NC State	2	–	2	–	0	6	–	4	–	0
Washington and Lee	1	–	3	–	1	3	–	4	–	1
Virginia	0	–	3	–	2	1	–	5	–	4
South Carolina	1	–	4	–	0	3	–	7	–	0
VMI	0	–	3	–	1	2	–	7	–	1
$ – Conference champion; Rankings from United Press

The 1935 VPI Gobblers football team represented Virginia Agricultural and Mechanical College and Polytechnic Institute in the 1935 college football season. The team was led by their head coach Henry Redd and finished with a record of four wins, three losses and two ties (4–3–2).

== Schedule ==
Date	Time	Opponent	Site	Result	Attendance	Source
September 21		Roanoke*	Miles Stadium; Blacksburg, VA	W 7–0	4,000	
September 28	2:30 p.m.	Clemson	Miles Stadium; Blacksburg, VA	L 7–28		
October 5	2:30 p.m.	at Maryland	Baltimore Stadium; Baltimore, MD	L 0–7		
October 12		vs. William & Mary*	City Stadium; Richmond, VA	T 0–0	7,500	
October 26	3:00 p.m.	vs. Washington and Lee	Municipal Stadium; Bluefield, WV	W 15–0	4,500-6,000	
November 2		South Carolina^{†}	Miles Stadium; Blacksburg, VA	W 27–0	4,000	
November 9	2:30 p.m.	vs. NC State	Trucker Stadium; Portsmouth, VA	L 0–6	6,000	
November 16		at Virginia	Scott Stadium; Charlottesville, VA (rivalry)	T 0–0	3,000	
November 28	2:15 p.m.	vs. VMI	Maher Field; Roanoke, VA (rivalry)	W 12–6	12,000	
*Non-conference game; ^{†}Homecoming; All times are in Eastern time

== Before the season ==
The 1934 VPI Gobblers football team compiled a 5–5 record and were led by Henry Redd in his third season as head coach.

== Game summaries ==
=== Roanoke ===
Roanoke at VPI

Team	1	2	3	4	Total
Roanoke	0	0	0	0	0
• VPI	7	0	0	0	7

- Date: September 21, 1935
- Location: Miles Stadium
  Blacksburg, VA
- Game attendance: 4,000
- Referee: Parrish (VPI)

VPI's first game of the season was a victory over Roanoke at Miles Stadium.

The starting lineup for VPI was: Doxey (left end), Davis (left tackle), Banks (left guard), Jones (center), Ingles (right guard), A. Robison (right tackle), Fittro (right end), Dickerson (quarterback), Henry (left halfback), Sodaro (right halfback), Shockey (fullback). The substitutes were: Bradshaw, Brown, Cregger, Dodge, Kennedy, Murray, Rakestraw, Russell and Vecellio.

The starting lineup for Roanoke was: Tut Agisheff (left end), George Pitzer (left tackle), Vic Cotter (left guard), Alex Schwartz (center), Edward Gough (right guard), Carey Brewbaker (right tackle), J. "Buss" Irvin (right end), Charles Patrone (quarterback), Herman Smith (left halfback), Gregory Wroniewicz (right halfback), John Pitzer (fullback). The substitutes were: Malcolm Carr, Earl Fisher, Nicholas LaCarrubba, Larry Larson, Paul Miller, Bill Mongiello, Tony Morisco, Charles Myrtle and Irving Zamcheck.

=== Clemson ===
Clemson at VPI

Team	1	2	3	4	Total
• Clemson	0	7	0	21	28
VPI	7	0	0	0	7

- Date: September 28, 1935
- Location: Miles Stadium
  Blacksburg, VA
- Game start: 2:30 p.m.
- Referee: Carrington (UVA)

After their victory over Roanoke, VPI played Clemson College at Miles Stadium.

The starting lineup for VPI was: Fittro (left end), A. Robison (left tackle), Ingles (left guard), Jones (center), Barnett (right guard), Banks (right tackle), Doxey (right end), Brown (quarterback), Henry (left halfback), Cregger (right halfback), Dickerson (fullback). The substitutes were: Bradshaw, Brown, Carpenter, Davis, Dodge, Kennedy, Murray, Piland, Priode, Rakestraw, J. Robison, Russell, Shockey, Sodaro and Vecellio.

The starting lineup for Clemson was: Shufford (left end), Thomas Brown (left tackle), Clarence Inabinet (left guard), Harry Shore (center), Fred Wyse (right guard), Manuel Black (right tackle), McConnell (right end), Joseph Berry (quarterback), Mac Folger (left halfback), Harlbert Lee (right halfback), Brewer Tate Horton (fullback). The substitutes were: William Croxton, Clifford Henley, Roddy Kissam, Winston Lawton, Harold Lewis, Clyde Pennington, Al Sanders, John Troutman, William Wiles and Al Yarborough.

=== Maryland ===
VPI at Maryland

Team	1	2	3	4	Total
VPI	0	0	0	0	0
• Maryland	0	0	7	0	7

- Date: October 5, 1935
- Location: Baltimore Stadium
  Baltimore, MD
- Game start: 2:30 p.m.

The starting lineup for VPI was: Fittro (left end), A. Robison (left tackle), Ingles (left guard), Jones (center), Banks (right guard), Dodge (right tackle), Shockey (right end), Kennedy (quarterback), Henry (left halfback), Cregger (right halfback), Dickerson (fullback). The substitutes were: Bradshaw, Brown, Carpenter, Davis, Murray, Priode, Rakestraw, Russell, Sodaro and Vecellio.

The starting lineup for Maryland was: Victor G. Willis (left end), Carl Stalfort (left tackle), Ed Minion (left guard), Bill Andorka (center), Michael Surgent (right guard), Charles Callahan (right tackle), Louis Ennis (right end), Coleman Headley (quarterback), Bill Guckeyson (left halfback), George Sachs (right halfback), Edmond Daly (fullback). The substitutes were: Bernie Buscher, Charles F. Ellinger, John Gormley, Blair Smith, Jack Stonebraker, and William Wolfe.

=== William & Mary ===
William & Mary vs. VPI

Team	1	2	3	4	Total
W&M	0	0	0	0	0
VPI	0	0	0	0	0

- Date: October 12, 1935
- Location: City Stadium
  Richmond, VA
- Game attendance: 7,500
- Referee: Paul Magoffin

The starting lineup for VPI was: Reynolds (left end), Dodge (left tackle), Bradshaw (left guard), Jones (center), Ingles (right guard), Banks (right tackle), Fittro (right end), Dickerson (quarterback), Sodaro (left halfback), Cregger (right halfback), Henry (fullback). The substitutes were: Carpenter, Kennedy, Piland, Priode, Russell, Shockey and Vecellio.

The starting lineup for William & Mary was: John Coiner (left end), Ned LeGrande (left tackle), Walter Hadtke (left guard), Hugh McGowan (center), Joseph Marino (right guard), Norman Murray (right tackle), Walter J. Zable (right end), John Truehart (quarterback), Otis Bunch (left halfback), Melville Bryant (right halfback), Richard Ames (fullback). The substitutes were: Arthur Blaker, Albert DeGutis, Richard Groettum, Robert Sheeran, R. S. Wallace, Arthur Woodward and Joseph Zanghi.

=== Washington and Lee ===
Washington and Lee vs. VPI

Team	1	2	3	4	Total
W&L	0	0	0	0	0
• VPI	0	0	7	8	15

- Date: October 26, 1935
- Location: Municipal Stadium
  Bluefield, WV
- Game start: 3:00 p.m.
- Game attendance: 4,500-6,000
- Referee: Black (Davidson)

The starting lineup for VPI was: Shockey (left end), Banks (left tackle), Ingles (left guard), Jones (center), Bradshaw (right guard), Dodge (right tackle), Fittro (right end), Carpenter (quarterback), Kennedy (left halfback), Sodaro (right halfback), Dickerson (fullback). The substitutes were: Brown, Cregger, Doxey, Henry, Murray, Piland, Priode, Ruby, Robison and Vecellio.

The starting lineup for Washington and Lee was: Charles Brasher (left end), Hugo Bonino (left tackle), Porter Berry (left guard), Edward Seitz (center), Carl Anderson (right guard), Alphonse Szymanski (right tackle), William Ellis (right end), Joseph Arnold (quarterback), Preston Moore (left halfback), Wilton Sample (right halfback), Jack Bailey (fullback). The substitutes were: George Lowry, Kerford Marchant, Bob Spessard, James Watts and James Wilson.

=== South Carolina ===
South Carolina at VPI

Team	1	2	3	4	Total
South Carolina	0	0	0	0	0
• VPI	6	7	0	14	27

- Date: November 2, 1935
- Location: Miles Stadium
  Blacksburg, VA
- Game attendance: 4,000
- Referee: Richard Carrington (UVA)

VPI's 1935 homecoming game was a victory over South Carolina.

The starting lineup for VPI was: Fittro (left end), A. Robison (left tackle), Ingles (left guard), Jones (center), Piland (right guard), Dodge (right tackle), Shockey (right end), Sodaro (quarterback), Kennedy (left halfback), Carpenter (right halfback), Dickerson (fullback).

The starting lineup for South Carolina was: Bob Johnson (left end), Osgood Bramlet (left tackle), Paul Gaffney (left guard), Ernest Stokes (center), Watson (right guard), Paul Robelot (right tackle), Larry Craig (right end), Clay "Bud" Alexander (quarterback), Wilburn Clary (left halfback), Jack Lyons (right halfback), Jack Derrenbacher (fullback).

=== NC State ===
NC State vs. VPI

Team	1	2	3	4	Total
• NC State	0	6	0	0	6
VPI	0	0	0	0	0

- Date: November 9, 1935
- Location: Trucker Stadium
  Portsmouth, VA
- Game start: 2:30 p.m.
- Game attendance: 6,000
- Referee: Richard Carrington (UVA)

The starting lineup for VPI was: Fittro (left end), A. Robison (left tackle), Ingles (left guard), Jones (center), Piland (right guard), Dodge (right tackle), Doxey (right end), Henry (quarterback), Cregger (left halfback), Carpenter (right halfback), Dickerson (fullback). The substitutes were: Banks, Bradshaw, Brown, Kennedy, Murray, Priode, Rakestraw, J. Robison, Russell, Sodaro and Vecellio.

The starting lineup for NC State was: Dom Cara (left end), Mason Bugg (left tackle), Alex Regdon (left guard), Steve Sabol (center), Barnes Worth (right guard), Vincent Farrar (right tackle), Connie Mack Berry (right end), Joseph Schwerdt (quarterback), Ed Berlinski (left halfback), Howard Bardes (right halfback), Peter Kuzma (fullback). The substitutes were: Cecil Brownie, Willy Dusty, Eddie Entwistle, Charles Gadd, C. F. Goode, E. V. Helms, Alex Regdon and Joseph Ryneska.

=== Virginia ===
VPI at Virginia

Team	1	2	3	4	Total
VPI	0	0	0	0	0
UVA	0	0	0	0	0

- Date: November 16, 1935
- Location: Scott Stadium
  Charlottesville, VA
- Game attendance: 3,000
- Game weather: "steady rain"
- Referee: Dixon Foster

The starting lineup for VPI was: Fittro (left end), A. Robison (left tackle), Piland (left guard), Jones (center), Ingles (right guard), Dodge (right tackle), Doxey (right end), Kennedy (quarterback), Henry (left halfback), Cregger (right halfback), Dickerson (fullback). The substitutes were: Shockey.

The starting lineup for Virginia was: John Leys (left end), William Weeks (left tackle), George Seibels (left guard), George Coen (center), Alfred Seccombe (right guard), William Banks (right tackle), Cullen Wilkin (right end), Evan Male (quarterback), A. B. Conner (left halfback), Conrad Ring (right halfback), Clark Martin (fullback).

=== VMI ===
VMI vs. VPI

Team	1	2	3	4	Total
VMI	6	0	0	0	6
• VPI	6	0	6	0	12

- Date: November 28, 1935
- Location: Maher Field
  Roanoke, VA
- Game start: 2:15 p.m.
- Game attendance: 12,000
- Game weather: 'drizzling rain"
- Referee: Buck Cheves

The starting lineup for VPI was: Doxey (left end), A. Robison (left tackle), Piland (left guard), Jones (center), Ingles (right guard), Dodge (right tackle), Fittro (right end), Carpenter (quarterback), Henry (left halfback), Cregger (right halfback), Dickerson (fullback). The substitutes were: Banks, Barnett, Bradshaw, Brown, Kennedy, Priode, Reynolds, Shockey and Vecellio.

The starting lineup for VMI was: David Kane (left end), Harry Hightower (left tackle), Al Fiedler (left guard), Embrey Rucker (center), James Farley (right guard), Russ Coleman (right tackle), William Shomo (right end), Archie Witt (quarterback), Billy Roberson (left halfback), Wayt Clark (right halfback), James Beard (fullback). The substitutes were: Maxie Bair, Charley Banks, Messick, Bill Oglesby and Tom White.

== NFL draft selections ==
Year	Round	Pick	Overall	Name	Team	Position
1937	7	3	63	Herman E. "Foots" Dickerson	Chicago Cardinals	End

== Players ==
=== Roster ===
VPI 1935 roster
Mac Banks; Bill Bradshaw; J. Wilson Brown; Buck Carpenter; Pete Cregger; Herman "Foots" Dickerson; Ben Dodge; Lloyd Doxey; Louis Fittro (Capt.); Mel Henry; Bud Ingles; Dave Jones	Wilburt Kennedy; Ruffner Murray; Oscar "Flinky" Piland; Robert McDowell Priode; Buford Houston Rakestraw; Buck Reynolds; Arthur Robison; Joseph O. Robison; Joe Russell; Carol Shockey; George Sodaro; Leo Vecellio

=== Varsity letter winners ===
Twenty-one players received varsity letters for their participation on the 1935 VPI team.

Player	Hometown	Notes
F. MacRae "Mac" Banks	Beckley, West Virginia	
Bill Bradshaw	Franklin, Virginia	
J. Wilson Brown	Mount Ulla, North Carolina	
John Albert "Jack/Buck" Carpenter	Brooklyn, New York	Son of former VPI player Hunter Carpenter.
Marvin Andrew "Pete" Cregger	Cripple Creek, Virginia	World War II veteran (Lieutenant Colonel, Army).
Herman Edward "Foots" Dickerson	Reidsville, North Carolina	World War II veteran (Major, Army). First Virginia Tech player to be chosen in the NFL draft.
Benjamin Walter Dodge	Norfolk, Virginia	
Lloyd Gibbs Doxey	Halifax, North Carolina	World War II veteran (Army). Awarded the Bronze Star Medal and Purple Heart.
Louis Leonard Fittro (Capt.)	Clarksburg, West Virginia	
Melvin Henry	Cumberland, Maryland	
James Lewis "Bud" Ingles	Roanoke, Virginia	World War II veteran (Lieutenant Colonel, Army).
David R. Jones	Cambria, Virginia	
Wilbur P. Kennedy		
Ruffner Page Murray	Memphis, Tennessee	
Oscar Glazier "Flinky" Piland	Suffolk, Virginia	World War II veteran (Lieutenant Colonel, Army).
Lawrence Samuel "Buck" Reynolds		
Arthur Stephen Robison	Richmond, Virginia	World War II veteran (Army).
Joseph Decatur Russell	Suffolk, Virginia	
Carol Leo Shockey	Shockeysville, Virginia	
George Edward Sodaro	Charleston, West Virginia	World War II veteran (Tec 4, Army). Awarded the Bronze Star Medal.
Leo Arthur Vecellio	Beckley, West Virginia	World War II veteran (Army). Awarded the Legion of Merit.

== Coaching and training staff ==
- Head coach: Henry Redd
- Manager: Copeland
- Freshman head coach: Herbert McEver
- Freshman Manager: Shirk
