= 1935 William & Mary Indians football team =

American college football season

1935 William & Mary Indians football

Virginia Conference champion
- Conference: Virginia Conference
- Record: 3–4–3 (2–0–1 Virginia)
- Head coach: Thomas Dowler (1st season)
- Captain: M. Bryant
- Home stadium: Cary Field

The 1935 William & Mary Indians football team represented the College of William & Mary as a member of the Virginia Conference the 1935 college football season. Led by Thomas Dowler in his first and only season as head coach, the Indians compiled an overall record of 3–4–3 with a mark of 2–0–1in conference play, winning the Virginia Conference title. The seasons opener against the Virginia was the first game played at William & Mary's newly-opened Cary Field. The game ended in a 0–0 tie.

== Schedule ==
Date	Opponent	Site	Result	Attendance	Source
September 21	Virginia*	Cary Field; Williamsburg, VA	T 0–0	6,000	
September 28	at Navy*	Thompson Stadium; Annapolis, MD	L 0–30	12,000	
October 5	at Army*	Michie Stadium; West Point NY	L 0–14		
October 12	vs. VPI*	City Stadium; Richmond, VA	T 0–0	7,500	
October 19	Guilford*	Cary Field; Williamsburg, VA	W 44–0		
October 26	Roanoke	Cary Field; Williamsburg, VA	W 14–7		
November 2	VMI*^{†}	Cary Field; Williamsburg, VA (rivalry)	L 0–19		
November 9	at Dartmouth*	Memorial Field; Hanover, NH	L 0–34	9,000	
November 16	Emory and Henry	Cary Field; Williamsburg, VA	W 22–0	1,200	
November 28	at Richmond	City Stadium; Richmond, VA (rivalry)	T 6–6	12,000	
*Non-conference game; ^{†}Homecoming; Source:
