= Zable Stadium =

Sports stadium in Virginia, US

Walter J. Zable Stadium at Cary Field
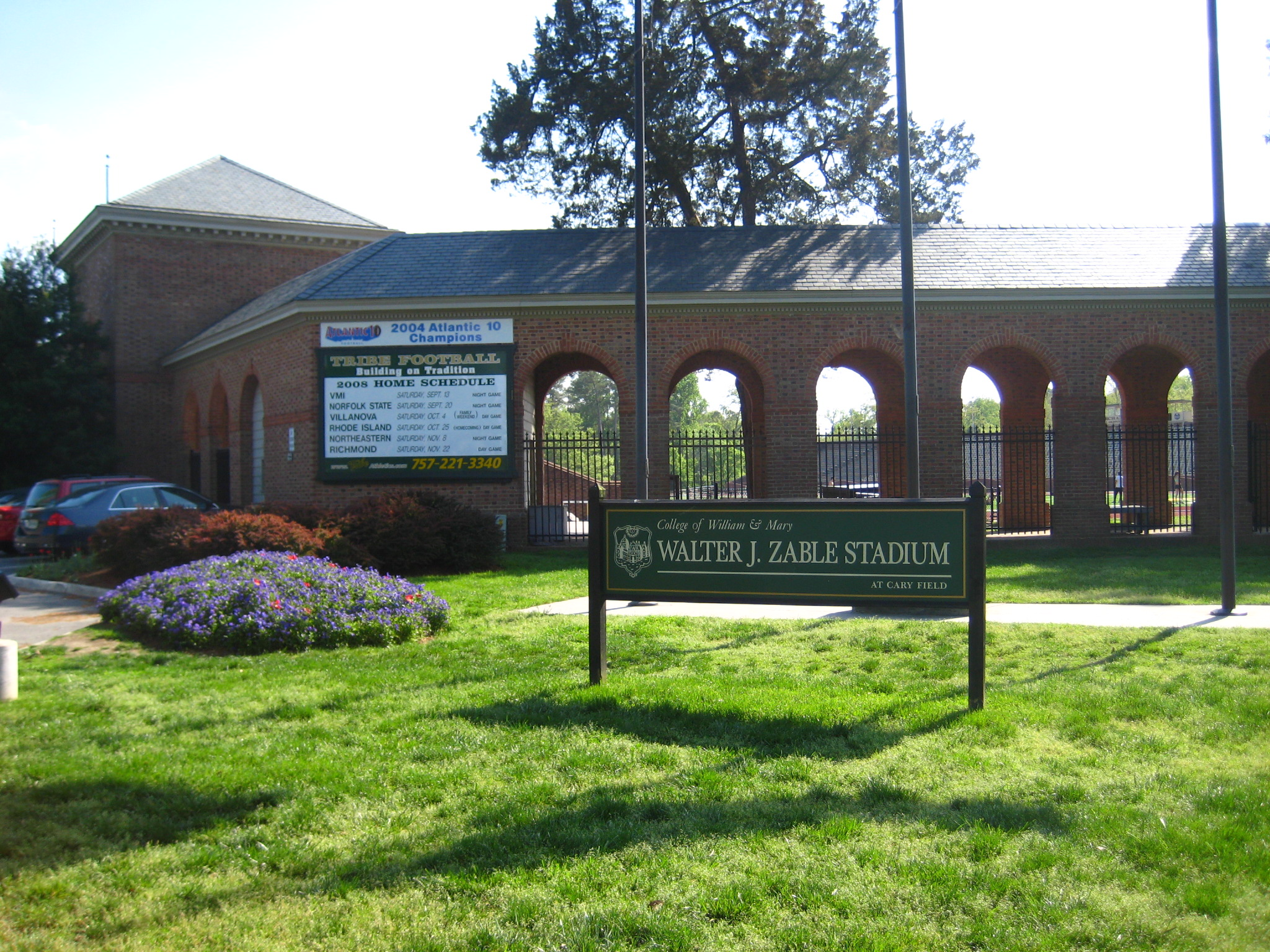
- Interactive map of Walter J. Zable Stadium at Cary Field
- Former names: Cary Field (1935–1989)
- Location: Williamsburg, Virginia
- Coordinates: 37°16′22″N 76°42′51″W
- Owner: College of William & Mary
- Operator: College of William & Mary
- Capacity: 12,672 (2016–present); 11,686 (2014–2015); 12,259 (2004–2013); 13,279 (1997–2003); 15,000 (1935–1996); Official record: 18,054 (1985); Unofficial record: 19,000+ (1949)
- Surface: FieldTurf Revolution 360

Construction
- Groundbreaking: 1934
- Opened: September 21, 1935
- Cost: $138,395 (1935) ($3.25 million in 2025 dollars), $27 million (renovations)
- Architects: BCWH & McMillan Pazdan Smith (renovations)

Tenants
- William & Mary Tribe football William & Mary Tribe track and field

Walter J. Zable Stadium at Cary Field is a stadium of the College of William & Mary in Williamsburg, Virginia. It is the home of the William & Mary Tribe football team. It is located centrally on the William & Mary campus, adjoining the Sadler Center (formerly the University Center) building and situated on Richmond Road. named for Walter J. Zable, former member of the College of William & Mary Board of Visitors, The stadium is used for football and track & field. It has an official capacity of 12,672 fans. The attendance figures for William & Mary football games are usually inexact, however, since students are not counted among the official results in an accurate fashion. The area of Cary Field behind the stadium was previously the baseball field for William & Mary until the opening of Plumeri Park in 1999.

== History ==
The Stadium at Cary Field was constructed in 1935 at a cost of $138,395 under a grant from President Franklin D. Roosevelt's Public Works Administration. The namesakes of the stadium are Walter (W&M class of 1937) and Betty Zable (class of 1940), who made a $10 million contribution to William & Mary in 1990, adding the Zable moniker to the existing Cary Field. The construction of the stadium is distinct in that the primary entrance to the stadium is at the 50 yard line on one side, eliminating prime midfield seating locations. In order to secure the stadium, college officials had it designed for agriculture expositions with a cattle entrance at midfield. No expositions, however, were ever held, but the midfield seats remained lost.

The first football game played at the stadium was the 1935 season opener, a scoreless tie against the University of Virginia. Zable himself played in the game.

== Recent developments ==
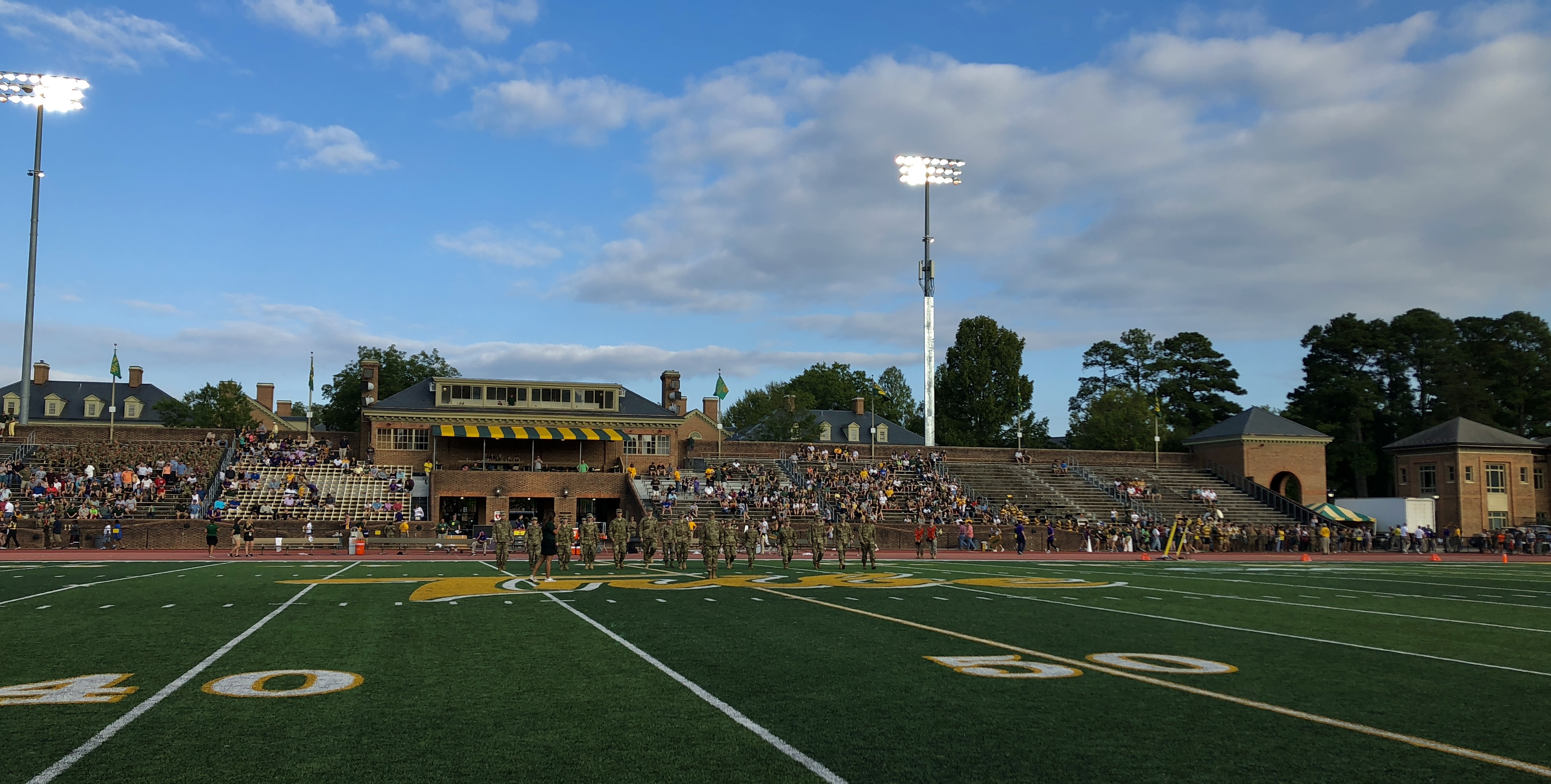
ROTC students at Zable Stadium, 2018

The largest crowd in Zable Stadium history was more than 19,000 in the 1949 loss against the University of North Carolina. Zable did not feature permanent lighting for evening games until 2005, when gifts of $650,000 allowed the construction of lights over the stadium. The gifts were spurred by the 2004 NCAA Division I-AA playoff game that William & Mary hosted against James Madison University. The game was nationally televised by ESPN2, and portable lights were brought in on trucks to allow the game to be played in ESPN's evening time slot. The game featured the largest crowd in recent Zable history and created a demand for additional night games. Previously, displeasure from the Williamsburg community over night games had kept the demand for lights to a minimum.

In 2006, Cary Field's natural grass surface was replaced with FieldTurf pro, the same turf used in over 20 NFL football stadiums. The project cost an estimated $840,000.

On August 26, 2014, the college unveiled plans for the renovation and expansion carried out by BCWH and McMillan Pazdan Smith. The project cost $28 million. An initial $10 million gift from the estate of Zable was supplemented by two $6 million gifts from James and Frances McGlothlin and Hunter Smith. The renovation expanded the west side of the stadium, including a suite level, second deck of seating, press box, and upper concourse. The east side of the stadium was also renovated, as well as bathrooms and concession areas. The project began in early 2015 and was completed in time for the start of the 2016 football season. The construction did not alter the 2015 season.

== See also ==
- List of NCAA Division I FCS football stadiums
