= 1935 college football season =

American college football season

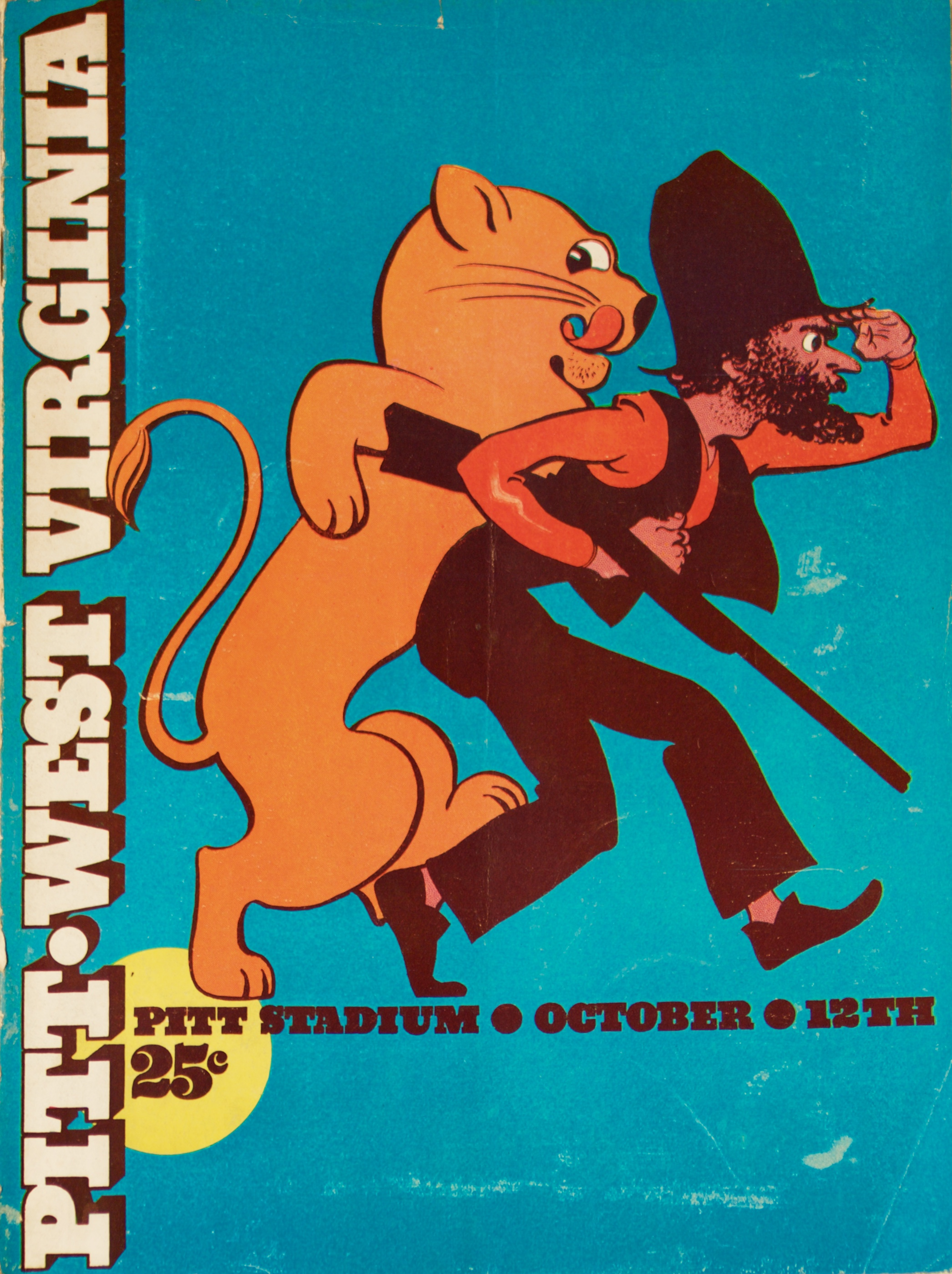
- Official program for the Pitt vs. West Virginia game
- Number of bowls: 4
- Bowl games: January 1, 1936
- Champion(s): Minnesota (Note: per Boand System, Litkenhous Ratings, Poling System, Toledo Cup, Billingsley Report, College Football Researchers Association, Helms Athletic Foundation, National Championship Foundation; co champion (alongside Princeton and SMU)); SMU (Note: per Dickinson System, Houlgate System, Berryman QPRS, Sagarin Ratings Elo chess method, and Sagarin Ratings Predictor method; co champion (alongside Minnesota and Princeton)); Princeton (Note: per Dunkel System; co-champion (alongside Minnesota and SMU)); TCU (Note: per Williamson System. The NCAA Football Bowl Subdivision Records book lists the Williamson System as having selected TCU and LSU as co-champions for 1935. However, the system's post-bowl final rankings published in January 1936 show TCU first, SMU second, and LSU third. The accompanying column written by Paul B. Williamson states "There was no undisputable national champion in 1935".)
- Heisman: Chicago halfback Jay Berwanger

The 1935 college football season was the last one before the Associated Press (AP) writers' poll was used in selecting the national champion. There were seven contemporary math system selectors that year who are informally recognized by the NCAA as "nationwide in scope". The Dickinson System, run by University of Illinois Professor Frank Dickinson, selected Southern Methodist University (SMU) as best in the nation. The Houlgate System, created by Carroll Everard "Deke" Houlgate Sr., also selected SMU. The contemporary Boand, Litkenhous and Poling math rating systems all selected Minnesota as the No. 1 team in the nation. The Dunkel System selected Princeton as its top team. The Williamson System, by Paul O. Williamson of New Orleans, ranked Texas Christian University first.

The 1935 season also marked the first time the Heisman Trophy was awarded. It was won by Jay Berwanger of Chicago. Quarterback Ray Zeh of Case Western Reserve led the nation in scoring.

== Conference and program changes ==
School	1934 Conference	1935 Conference
Texas Mines (UTEP) Miners	Independent	Border
Tulsa Golden Hurricane	Independent	Missouri Valley
Washburn Ichabods	Independent	Missouri Valley

== September ==
September 21

SMU opened with a 39–0 win over North Texas and TCU opened its season with a 41–0 win over visiting Howard Payne College.

September 28

SMU beat Austin College 60–0 and TCU beat North Texas 28–11. Stanford beat San Jose State 35–0 and UCLA beat Utah State 39–0., Fordham University, whose 1936 team would include the legendary Seven Blocks of Granite was a favorite New York City college football teams, after New York University and Columbia University. The Rams played all of their games at home at the Polo Grounds, which also hosted the NFL's New york Giants. In a game against visiting Franklin & Marshall, the Rams were losing until they scored two touchdowns in the fourth quarter for a 14–7 win. California played a doubleheader, beating UC-Davis 47–0 and Whittier 6–0. Notre Dame defeated visiting Kansas, 28–7. Pittsburgh had an unexpectedly difficult time in a 14–0 win over visiting Waynesburg College.

== October ==
October 5

Minnesota beat visiting North Dakota State 26–6, Stanford won at the U. of San Francisco 10–0 and California beat St. Mary's 10–0. In Portland, UCLA beat Oregon State 20–7. Ohio State beat Kentucky 19–6, Princeton edged Penn 7–6, Fordham beat Boston College 19–0, Notre Dame won at Carnegie Tech 14–3, and Pittsburgh won at Washington & Jefferson 35–0. TCU won at Arkansas 13–7 and SMU beat visiting Tulsa 14–0.

October 12

Minnesota won at Nebraska 12–7 and Ohio State defeated visiting Drake 85–7. In Portland, California beat Oregon, 6–0. TCU won at Tulsa, 13–0. In St. Louis, SMU beat Washington University 35–6. Notre Dame won at Wisconsin, 27–0 Pittsburgh beat West Virginia, 24–6. Fordham lost to Purdue, 20–0 Princeton defeated Williams College, 14–7.

October 19

UCLA won at Stanford, 7–6. Notre Dame (3–0) and Pittsburgh, both 3–0–0, met at South Bend, with the Fighting Irish handing Pitt its first loss, 9–6. Minnesota beat visiting Tulane 20–0 Ohio State beat Northwestern 28–7. SMU and Rice, both 4–0–0, met in Dallas, with SMU winning, 10–0. TCU beat visiting Texas A&M 19–14 to stay unbeaten. California beat Santa Clara 6–0. Princeton beat Rutgers, 29–6. Fordham beat Vanderbilt, 13–7

October 26

TCU won at Centenary, 27–7. Stanford won at Washington 6–0, California beat visiting USC, 21–7, and UCLA beat Oregon, 33–6. Minnesota beat Northwestern at home 21–13 and Ohio State won at Indiana 28–6 Fordham defeated Lebanon Valley College 15–0. Pittsburgh beat Penn State 9–0. Princeton won at Cornell 54–0. At Baltimore, Notre Dame beat Navy 14–0. In a game at Wichita Falls, Texas, SMU beat Hardin–Simmons 18–6.

== November ==
November 2

Notre Dame (5–0–0) and Ohio State (4–0–0) met at Columbus before a crowd of 80,000. Grantland Rice described what happened: "Completely outplayed in the first two quarters, trailing 13 to 0 as the final quarter started with every killing break against it-- breaks that would crack the heart of an iron ox-- this Notre Dame team came surging back in the final quarter...". Notre Dame scored early in the fourth, but the extra point attempt bounced off the crossbar, and it was 13–6. After an interception, the Irish drove to within six inches of the goal line when Milner fumbled the ball away. With 90 seconds left, Andy Pilney passed to Mike Layden for a touchdown, but the extra point failed and the Irish trailed 13–12. Andy Pilney forced a Buckeye fumble at midfield, giving the Irish the ball at the 49 yard line, and on the next play, Pilney, taking back over as quarterback, scrambled to the 19 yard line, but was injured. With only one play left in the game, reserve quarterback Bill Shakespeare passed to Wayne Milner for the 18–13 win.

At Los Angeles, California (6–0–0) faced UCLA (4–0–0) and won 14–2. TCU visited Baylor (6–0–0). TCU shut the Bears out 28–0. SMU beat visiting Texas 20–0. Minnesota beat Purdue 29–7. Stanford beat Santa Clara in another close game, 9–6. Fordham and Pittsburgh played to a 0–0 tie. Princeton defeated Navy 26–0.

November 9

Unbeaten Notre Dame hosted the Northwestern Wildcats, who had a losing record (2–3–0). With William Shakespeare at left halfback for the Irish, and Henry Wardsworth Longfellow playing right end for the Wildcats, the game looked like no more than a meeting of literary namesakes. Shakespeare's running game was shut down, while Longfellow caught one touchdown pass, and then recovered a fumble in the fourth quarter to set up a second touchdown for a major upset, as Northwestern won 14–7 Minnesota won at Iowa 13–6. In Los Angeles, SMU handed UCLA (4–1–0) its second straight loss, 21–0. Stanford won at USC, 3–0. California beat Washington 14–0.

Fordham tied St. Mary's College 7–7, Princeton beat Harvard 35–0 and Pittsburgh beat visiting Army 29–6. Ohio State won at Chicago, 20–13. In a Friday game at New Orleans, TCU beat Loyola College 14–0.

November 16

TCU won at Texas 28–0 and SMU won at Arkansas 17–6. Fordham beat Muhlenberg College 45–0 at the Polo Grounds, while Notre Dame and Army played to a 6–6 tie at Yankee Stadium. Pittsburgh beat Nebraska 6–0 and Princeton beat Lehigh 27–0. Stanford defeated Montana 32–0 California beat Pacific 39–0 Ohio State beat Illinois 38–0 and Minnesota won at Michigan 40–0 In a Friday game, UCLA beat visiting Hawaii 19–6.

November 23

California (9–0) and Stanford (6–1–0) met at Palo Alto, as Stanford handed the Golden Bears their first loss, 13–0. On the strength of the win, Stanford got the bid to the Rose Bowl. In a matchup of two great Ivy teams, Princeton (7–0–0) hosted Dartmouth (8–0–0), with Princeton winning 26–6. SMU defeated visiting Baylor 10–0 and TCU beat visiting Rice, 27–6, as both teams raised their records to 10–0–0.

UCLA beat Loyola Marymount 14–6 Notre Dame closed its season with a 20–13 win over USC. Minnesota beat visiting Wisconsin, 33–7 to close its season at 8–0–0.

For the first time, Ohio State closed with its regular season with Michigan, a tradition that continued with only one interruption, in 1942. OSU won at Ann Arbor, 38–0.

On Thanksgiving Day, November 28 a crowd of 78,000 turned out at Yankee Stadium to watch Fordham (5–1–2) face New York University (7–1–0). Fordham shut out NYU 21–0, but not before a fight broke out with the spectators crowding the field, Pittsburgh (6–1–0) and Carnegie Tech (2–5–0) played to a 0–0 tie.

November 30

The most eagerly watched game of the season matched two unbeaten (10–0–0) teams, with Texas Christian (10–0–0) hosting Southern Methodist. SMU won 20–14 and was invited to the Rose Bowl, while TCU went to the Sugar Bowl.

Princeton closed its season with a 38–7 win at Yale, to finish 9–0–0.

== December ==
December 7

UCLA beat Idaho 13–6. TCU won at Santa Clara, 10–6.

December 14

In San Francisco, UCLA closed its season with a 13–7 win over St. Mary's, while in Los Angeles, Pittsburgh beat USC 12–7.

== Conference standings ==
=== Major conference standings ===
1935 Big Six Conference football standings
	Conf.					Overall
Team	W		L		T	W		L		T
No. 21 Nebraska $	4	–	0	–	1	6	–	2	–	1
Oklahoma	3	–	2	–	0	6	–	3	–	0
Kansas	2	–	2	–	1	4	–	4	–	1
Kansas State	1	–	2	–	2	2	–	4	–	3
Iowa State	1	–	3	–	1	2	–	4	–	3
Missouri	0	–	2	–	3	3	–	3	–	3
$ – Conference champion; Rankings from United Press

1935 Big Ten Conference football standings
	Conf.					Overall
Team	W		L		T	W		L		T
No. 1 Minnesota +	5	–	0	–	0	8	–	0	–	0
No. 5 Ohio State +	5	–	0	–	0	7	–	1	–	0
Purdue	3	–	3	–	0	4	–	4	–	0
Indiana	2	–	2	–	1	4	–	3	–	1
No. 16 Northwestern	2	–	3	–	1	4	–	3	–	1
No. 18 Iowa	1	–	2	–	2	4	–	2	–	2
Chicago	2	–	3	–	0	4	–	4	–	0
Michigan	2	–	3	–	0	4	–	4	–	0
Illinois	1	–	4	–	0	3	–	5	–	0
Wisconsin	1	–	4	–	0	1	–	7	–	0
+ – Conference co-champions; Rankings from United Press

1935 Border Conference football standings
	Conf.					Overall
Team	W		L		T	W		L		T
Arizona $	4	–	0	–	0	7	–	2	–	0
New Mexico A&M	4	–	1	–	0	7	–	1	–	2
New Mexico	3	–	2	–	0	6	–	4	–	0
Arizona State	2	–	3	–	1	2	–	5	–	1
Arizona State–Flagstaff	0	–	3	–	1	3	–	3	–	3
Texas Tech	0	–	1	–	0	5	–	3	–	2
Texas Mines	0	–	3	–	0	1	–	8	–	0
$ – Conference champion

1935 Pacific Coast Conference football standings
	Conf.					Overall
Team	W		L		T	W		L		T
No. 6 Stanford ^ +	4	–	1	–	0	8	–	1	–	0
No. 9 California +	4	–	1	–	0	9	–	1	–	0
No. 18 UCLA +	4	–	1	–	0	8	–	2	–	0
Washington State	3	–	2	–	0	5	–	3	–	1
Oregon	3	–	2	–	0	6	–	3	–	0
No. 23 Washington	4	–	3	–	0	5	–	3	–	0
Oregon State	2	–	3	–	1	6	–	4	–	1
USC	2	–	4	–	0	5	–	7	–	0
Idaho	1	–	5	–	0	2	–	7	–	0
Montana	0	–	5	–	1	1	–	5	–	2
+ – Conference co-champions; ^ – Selected as Rose Bowl representative; Rankings from United Press

1935 Rocky Mountain Conference football standings
	Conf.					Overall
Team	W		L		T	W		L		T
Utah State +	5	–	1	–	1	5	–	2	–	1
Colorado +	5	–	1	–	0	5	–	4	–	0
Utah	4	–	1	–	1	4	–	3	–	1
Denver	5	–	2	–	0	6	–	3	–	0
Colorado State–Greeley	2	–	1	–	0	4	–	3	–	0
Colorado College	4	–	2	–	1	4	–	3	–	1
BYU	3	–	4	–	0	4	–	4	–	0
Wyoming	3	–	4	–	0	4	–	4	–	0
Colorado A&M	2	–	4	–	1	3	–	4	–	1
Montana State	1	–	5	–	0	2	–	6	–	1
Colorado Mines	1	–	6	–	0	1	–	6	–	0
Western State (CO)	0	–	4	–	0	1	–	6	–	0
+ – Conference co-champions

1935 Southeastern Conference football standings
	Conf.					Overall
Team		W		L			W		L
No. 7 LSU $	5	–	0	–	0	9	–	2	–	0
Vanderbilt	5	–	1	–	0	7	–	3	–	0
Ole Miss	3	–	1	–	0	9	–	3	–	0
No. 15 Auburn	5	–	2	–	0	8	–	2	–	0
No. 17 Alabama	4	–	2	–	0	6	–	2	–	1
Tulane	3	–	3	–	0	6	–	4	–	0
Kentucky	3	–	3	–	0	5	–	4	–	0
Georgia Tech	3	–	4	–	0	5	–	5	–	0
Mississippi State	2	–	3	–	0	8	–	3	–	0
Tennessee	2	–	3	–	0	4	–	5	–	0
Georgia	2	–	4	–	0	6	–	4	–	0
Florida	1	–	6	–	0	3	–	7	–	0
Sewanee	0	–	6	–	0	2	–	7	–	0
$ – Conference champion; Rankings from United Press

1935 Southern Conference football standings
	Conf.					Overall
Team	W		L		T	W		L		T
No. 13 Duke $	5	–	0	–	0	8	–	2	–	0
No. 12 North Carolina	4	–	1	–	0	8	–	1	–	0
Maryland	3	–	1	–	1	7	–	2	–	2
Clemson	2	–	1	–	0	6	–	3	–	0
VPI	3	–	3	–	1	4	–	3	–	2
NC State	2	–	2	–	0	6	–	4	–	0
Washington and Lee	1	–	3	–	1	3	–	4	–	1
Virginia	0	–	3	–	2	1	–	5	–	4
South Carolina	1	–	4	–	0	3	–	7	–	0
VMI	0	–	3	–	1	2	–	7	–	1
$ – Conference champion; Rankings from United Press

1935 Southwest Conference football standings
	Conf.					Overall
Team	W		L		T	W		L		T
No. 2 SMU $	6	–	0	–	0	12	–	1	–	0
No. 4 TCU	5	–	1	–	0	12	–	1	–	0
Baylor	3	–	3	–	0	8	–	3	–	0
Rice	3	–	3	–	0	8	–	3	–	0
Arkansas	2	–	4	–	0	5	–	5	–	0
Texas A&M	1	–	5	–	0	3	–	7	–	0
Texas	1	–	5	–	0	4	–	6	–	0
$ – Conference champion; Rankings from United Press

=== Independents ===
1935 Eastern college football independents records
	Conf.			Overall
Team	W	L	T	W		L		T
No. 3 Princeton		–		9	–	0	–	0
No. 14 Holy Cross		–		9	–	0	–	1
NYU		–		7	–	1	–	0
Dartmouth		–		8	–	2	–	0
Northeastern		–		5	–	0	–	3
Syracuse		–		6	–	1	–	1
No. 10 Pittsburgh		–		7	–	1	–	2
No. 11 Fordham		–		6	–	1	–	2
Villanova		–		7	–	2	–	0
Franklin & Marshall		–		7	–	2	–	1
Providence		–		6	–	2	–	0
No. 18 Army		–		6	–	2	–	1
Colgate		–		7	–	3	–	0
Temple		–		7	–	3	–	0
Boston College		–		6	–	3	–	0
Bucknell		–		6	–	3	–	0
Duquesne		–		6	–	3	–	0
Yale		–		6	–	3	–	0
CCNY		–		4	–	3	–	0
Manhattan		–		5	–	3	–	1
Massachusetts State		–		5	–	4	–	0
La Salle		–		4	–	4	–	1
Penn		–		4	–	4	–	0
Penn State		–		4	–	4	–	0
Columbia		–		4	–	4	–	1
Vermont		–		4	–	5	–	0
Boston University		–		3	–	4	–	2
Harvard		–		3	–	5	–	0
Carnegie Tech		–		2	–	5	–	1
Buffalo		–		2	–	6	–	0
Tufts		–		1	–	5	–	2
Brown		–		1	–	8	–	0
Cornell		–		0	–	6	–	1
Rankings from United Press

1935 Midwestern college football independents records
	Conf.			Overall
Team	W	L	T	W		L		T
No. 23 Marquette		–		7	–	1	–	0
No. 8 Notre Dame		–		7	–	1	–	1
Michigan State		–		6	–	2	–	0
DePaul		–		5	–	2	–	1
Wayne		–		5	–	2	–	1
Detroit		–		6	–	3	–	0
Xavier		–		6	–	3	–	0
Michigan State Normal		–		4	–	2	–	2
Western State Teachers		–		5	–	3	–	0
Michigan Tech		–		2	–	2	–	1
Saint Louis		–		5	–	6	–	0
Central State (MI)		–		1	–	6	–	0
Haskell		–		0	–	7	–	1
Rankings from United Press

1935 Southern college football independents records
	Conf.			Overall
Team	W	L	T	W		L		T
Catholic University		–		8	–	1	–	0
William & Mary Norfolk		–		8	–	1	–	0
Texas Wesleyan		–		8	–	2	–	1
George Washington		–		6	–	3	–	0
Hardin–Simmons		–		6	–	3	–	1
Tennessee State		–		4	–	3	–	1
Navy		–		5	–	4	–	0
Western Maryland		–		6	–	5	–	0
East Carolina		–		3	–	3	–	0
Georgetown		–		4	–	4	–	0
Tampa		–		5	–	5	–	0
Troy State		–		5	–	5	–	0
South Georgia Teachers		–		3	–	3	–	2
West Virginia		–		3	–	4	–	2
Oklahoma City		–		3	–	4	–	1
Texas A&I		–		3	–	5	–	0
Delaware		–		2	–	5	–	1
Jacksonville State		–		2	–	5	–	0
Wake Forest		–		2	–	7	–	0
Oglethorpe		–		1	–	8	–	0

1935 Western college football independents records
	Conf.			Overall
Team	W	L	T	W		L		T
Idaho Southern Branch		–		7	–	0	–	1
Humboldt State		–		6	–	1	–	1
Cal Poly		–		5	–	2	–	1
Pomona		–		5	–	2	–	1
No. 23 Saint Mary's		–		5	–	2	–	2
Hawaii		–		5	–	3	–	0
San Francisco		–		5	–	3	–	0
Gonzaga		–		5	–	4	–	1
Loyola (CA)		–		6	–	5	–	0
San Jose State		–		5	–	5	–	1
Portland		–		3	–	4	–	0
Santa Clara		–		3	–	6	–	1
San Francisco State		–		2	–	5	–	1
Rankings from United Press

=== Minor conferences ===
Conference	Champion(s)	Record
Central Intercollegiate Athletics Association	Morgan College	7–0
Central Intercollegiate Athletic Conference	Kansas State Teachers–Hays; Kansas State Teachers–Pittsburg; Wichita	3–1
Far Western Conference	Fresno State Normal	4–0
Indiana Intercollegiate Conference	Butler	5–0
Iowa Intercollegiate Athletic Conference	Luther	4–0
Kansas Collegiate Athletic Conference	Kansas Wesleyan	4–0–1
Lone Star Conference	North Texas State Teachers; Stephen F. Austin State Teachers; East Texas State Teachers	3–1
Michigan Intercollegiate Athletic Association	Alma	4–0
Michigan-Ontario Collegiate Conference	Adrian	3–0
Midwest Collegiate Athletic Conference	Ripon	2–0–1
Minnesota Intercollegiate Athletic Conference	Gustavus Adolphus; Saint John's (MN); Saint Olaf	3–0–1; 3–0–1; 3–0
Missouri Intercollegiate Athletic Association	Northeast Missouri State Teachers	5–0
Nebraska College Athletic Conference	Hastings	3–1
Nebraska Intercollegiate Athletic Association	Omaha University	4–0
North Central Intercollegiate Athletic Conference	North Dakota Agricultural	4–0–1
North Dakota College Athletic Conference	Jamestown College	4–0
Northern Teachers Athletic Conference	Moorhead State Teachers	4–0
Ohio Athletic Conference	Baldwin–Wallace	8–0
Oklahoma Collegiate Athletic Conference	Central State Teachers (OK); East Central State (OK)	4–1
Pacific Northwest Conference	Linfield; Willamette	3–0–1; 4–0
Pennsylvania State Athletic Conference	Shippensburg State Teachers	5–1
South Dakota Intercollegiate Conference	Augustana (SD)	5–0
Southern California Intercollegiate Athletic Conference	Whittier	4–1
Southern Intercollegiate Athletic Conference	Alabama State	6–0–1
Southwestern Athletic Conference	Texas College	5–0–1
Texas Conference	Austin	4–0–2
Tri-Normal League	State Normal–Cheney	1–0–1
Wisconsin State Teachers College Conference	North: Superior State Teachers; South: Oshkosh State Teachers	3–0–1; 4–0

=== Minor conference standings ===
1935 Buckeye Athletic Association football standings
	Conf.					Overall
Team	W		L		T	W		L		T
No. 21 Ohio $	5	–	0	–	0	8	–	0	–	0
Cincinnati	3	–	2	–	0	7	–	2	–	0
Ohio Wesleyan	3	–	2	–	0	5	–	3	–	1
Dayton	2	–	2	–	1	4	–	4	–	1
Miami (OH)	1	–	3	–	1	5	–	3	–	1
Marshall	0	–	5	–	0	4	–	6	–	0
$ – Conference champion; Rankings from United Press

1935 Central Intercollegiate Conference football standings
	Conf.					Overall
Team	W		L		T	W		L		T
Fort Hays State +	3	–	1	–	0	8	–	2	–	0
Pittsburg State +	3	–	1	–	0	6	–	3	–	0
Wichita +	3	–	1	–	0	5	–	4	–	0
Emporia Teachers	1	–	3	–	0	4	–	4	–	0
Southwestern (KS)	0	–	4	–	0	4	–	5	–	0
$ – Conference champion

1935 Chesapeake Conference football standings
	Conf.					Overall
Team	W		L		T	W		L		T
Randolph–Macon $	3	–	0	–	0	8	–	0	–	2
Hampden–Sydney	2	–	1	–	0	5	–	5	–	0
American	1	–	2	–	0	3	–	4	–	0
Bridgewater	0	–	3	–	0	0	–	7	–	0
$ – Conference champion

1935 Colored Intercollegiate Athletic Association football standings
	Conf.					Overall
Team	W		L		T	W		L		T
Morgan $	7	–	0	–	0	8	–	0	–	0
Hampton	7	–	1	–	0	7	–	1	–	0
Bluefield State	6	–	2	–	0	6	–	3	–	0
Virginia State	5	–	3	–	0	6	–	3	–	1
North Carolina College	5	–	2	–	0	5	–	3	–	0
Virginia Union	4	–	3	–	1	4	–	3	–	1
Lincoln (PA)	2	–	2	–	1	2	–	3	–	2
Shaw	3	–	3	–	0	3	–	3	–	0
Johnson C. Smith	2	–	3	–	0	2	–	4	–	1
Howard	1	–	5	–	0	3	–	5	–	0
Saint Paul (VA)	1	–	7	–	0	1	–	7	–	0
North Carolina A&T	1	–	8	–	0	1	–	8	–	0
St. Augustine's	0	–	5	–	0	0	–	5	–	0
$ – Conference champion; Conference standings were based on the Dickinson System. North Carolina A&T forfeited five conference wins, over Bluefield State, North Carolina College, Lincoln, Johnson C. Smith, and Saint Paul, and a conference tie with Virginia State due to ineligible players.

1935 Dixie Conference football standings
	Conf.					Overall
Team	W		L		T	W		L		T
Howard (AL) $	3	–	0	–	1	7	–	1	–	2
Chattanooga	3	–	1	–	1	4	–	3	–	1
Spring Hill	2	–	1	–	2	7	–	2	–	2
Millsaps	1	–	1	–	2	4	–	4	–	2
Southwestern (TN)	2	–	2	–	2	3	–	4	–	2
Mercer	1	–	1	–	0	4	–	5	–	0
Loyola (LA)	2	–	2	–	0	2	–	6	–	1
Birmingham–Southern	2	–	5	–	0	2	–	6	–	0
Mississippi College	1	–	4	–	1	2	–	6	–	1
Centre	0	–	0	–	1	1	–	7	–	1
$ – Conference champion

1935 Eastern Pennsylvania Collegiate Conference football standings
	Conf.					Overall
Team	W		L		T	W		L		T
Franklin & Marshall $	4	–	0	–	0	7	–	2	–	1
Ursinus	3	–	1	–	0	3	–	6	–	0
Dickinson	2	–	1	–	0	6	–	3	–	0
Gettysburg	1	–	3	–	0	3	–	4	–	1
Drexel	0	–	1	–	0	3	–	2	–	2
Muhlenberg	0	–	4	–	0	1	–	9	–	0
$ – Conference champion

1935 Far Western Conference football standings
	Conf.					Overall
Team	W		L		T	W		L		T
Fresno State $	4	–	0	–	0	6	–	3	–	0
Pacific (CA)	3	–	1	–	0	5	–	4	–	1
Nevada	2	–	2	–	0	2	–	6	–	0
Cal Aggies	1	–	3	–	0	2	–	6	–	1
Chico State	0	–	4	–	0	2	–	5	–	1
$ – Conference champion

1935 Illinois Intercollegiate Athletic Conference football standings
	Conf.					Overall
Team	W		L		T	W		L		T
Millikin +	4	–	0	–	0	5	–	1	–	0
Monmouth (IL) +	4	–	0	–	0	6	–	3	–	0
Northern Illinois State	5	–	1	–	1	7	–	1	–	1
Illinois College	5	–	1	–	0	5	–	3	–	0
McKendree	4	–	1	–	1	5	–	3	–	1
Illinois Wesleyan	4	–	1	–	0	7	–	3	–	0
Illinois State Normal	4	–	2	–	1	5	–	2	–	2
Elmhurst	2	–	1	–	1	5	–	2	–	1
Knox (IL)	2	–	1	–	1	5	–	2	–	2
Augustana (IL)	3	–	2	–	0	5	–	3	–	0
North Central	3	–	3	–	0	4	–	3	–	0
Carthage	2	–	3	–	0	4	–	4	–	0
Wheaton (IL)	1	–	2	–	1	2	–	5	–	1
St. Viator	1	–	2	–	0	2	–	4	–	2
Southern Illinois	1	–	4	–	1	1	–	7	–	1
Bradley	1	–	5	–	1	1	–	6	–	1
Western Illinois	1	–	6	–	0	2	–	6	–	0
Lake Forest	0	–	1	–	0	3	–	4	–	0
Eastern Illinois	0	–	5	–	0	1	–	7	–	0
Eureka	0	–	6	–	0	0	–	6	–	0
+ – Conference co-champions

1935 Indiana Intercollegiate Conference football standings
	Conf.					Overall
Team	W		L		T	W		L		T
Butler $	6	–	0	–	0	7	–	1	–	0
DePauw	5	–	0	–	2	5	–	1	–	2
Wabash	6	–	1	–	1	6	–	1	–	1
Indiana State	4	–	1	–	0	5	–	3	–	0
Manchester	3	–	1	–	2	4	–	1	–	2
Central Normal	2	–	1	–	2	3	–	1	–	3
Valparaiso	2	–	2	–	0	4	–	4	–	1
Ball State	3	–	4	–	1	3	–	4	–	1
Evansville	4	–	5	–	0	4	–	5	–	0
Hanover	2	–	3	–	0	2	–	5	–	1
Earlham	1	–	2	–	1	0	–	0	–	0
Saint Joseph's (IN)	1	–	3	–	0	1	–	4	–	0
Rose Poly	1	–	5	–	0	2	–	5	–	0
Franklin (IN)	1	–	7	–	0	1	–	7	–	0
Oakland City	0	–	6	–	1	0	–	7	–	1
$ – Conference champion

1935 Iowa Conference football standings
	Conf.					Overall
Team	W		L		T	W		L		T
Luther $	4	–	0	–	0	7	–	1	–	0
St. Ambrose	4	–	0	–	0	7	–	1	–	0
Upper Iowa	4	–	1	–	0	5	–	2	–	1
Parsons	5	–	1	–	0	6	–	2	–	0
Dubuque	2	–	2	–	0	3	–	4	–	0
Western Union	1	–	1	–	0	4	–	3	–	0
Columbia (IA)	2	–	3	–	0	3	–	4	–	0
Buena Vista	2	–	2	–	0	4	–	4	–	1
Central (IA)	3	–	3	–	0	4	–	5	–	0
Simpson (IA)	1	–	4	–	0	1	–	8	–	0
Iowa Wesleyan	1	–	6	–	0	2	–	7	–	0
Penn (IA)	0	–	6	–	0	1	–	7	–	0
$ – Conference champion; Conference standings were based on Stanley-Dean ranking.

1935 Kansas Collegiate Athletic Conference football standings
	Conf.					Overall
Team	W		L		T	W		L		T
Kansas Wesleyan $	4	–	0	–	1	4	–	3	–	1
Baker	3	–	1	–	1	3	–	4	–	2
McPherson	2	–	1	–	2	4	–	3	–	2
College of Emporia	3	–	2	–	0	3	–	5	–	1
Bethany (KS)	1	–	4	–	0	4	–	4	–	0
Ottawa	0	–	5	–	0	0	–	8	–	0
$ – Conference champion

1935 Lone Star Conference football standings
	Conf.					Overall
Team	W		L		T	W		L		T
East Texas State +	3	–	1	–	0	6	–	2	–	1
North Texas State +	3	–	1	–	0	5	–	3	–	1
Stephen F. Austin +	3	–	1	–	0	4	–	5	–	0
Southwest Texas State	1	–	3	–	0	2	–	7	–	0
Sam Houston State	0	–	4	–	0	3	–	6	–	0
+ – Conference co-champions

1935 Michigan Intercollegiate Athletic Association football standings
	Conf.					Overall
Team	W		L		T	W		L		T
Alma $	4	–	0	–	0	8	–	0	–	0
Kalamazoo	2	–	1	–	1	2	–	3	–	2
Hillsdale	1	–	2	–	1	4	–	4	–	1
Hope	1	–	2	–	1	3	–	3	–	2
Albion	0	–	3	–	1	0	–	6	–	2
$ – Conference champion

1935 Michigan-Ontario Collegiate Conference football standings
	Conf.					Overall
Team	W		L		T	W		L		T
Adrian $	3	–	0	–	0	7	–	3	–	0
Assumption (ON)	1	–	1	–	1	?	–	?	–	?
St. Mary's (MI)	1	–	1	–	1	1	–	4	–	1
Lawrence Tech	0	–	3	–	0	0	–	7	–	0
$ – Conference champion

1935 Middle Three Conference football standings
	Conf.					Overall
Team	W		L		T	W		L		T
Rutgers $	2	–	0	–	0	4	–	5	–	0
Lehigh	1	–	1	–	0	5	–	4	–	0
Lafayette	0	–	2	–	0	2	–	7	–	0
$ – Conference champion

1935 Midwest Conference football standings
	Conf.					Overall
Team	W		L		T	W		L		T
Ripon $	2	–	0	–	1	4	–	2	–	1
Cornell (IA)	3	–	1	–	1	3	–	4	–	2
Coe	2	–	1	–	1	5	–	1	–	2
Lawrence	2	–	1	–	1	4	–	1	–	3
Knox	2	–	2	–	1	5	–	2	–	2
Carleton	1	–	1	–	1	3	–	2	–	2
Monmouth (IL)	2	–	3	–	0	6	–	3	–	0
Beloit	0	–	5	–	0	1	–	6	–	0
$ – Conference champion

1935 Minnesota Intercollegiate Athletic Conference football standings
	Conf.					Overall
Team	W		L		T	W		L		T
Saint John's (MN) +	3	–	0	–	1	5	–	0	–	1
Gustavus Adolphus +	3	–	0	–	1	5	–	0	–	2
St. Olaf +	3	–	0	–	0	3	–	4	–	0
St. Thomas (MN)	3	–	1	–	2	4	–	2	–	2
Hamline	2	–	2	–	0	2	–	3	–	0
Macalester	0	–	3	–	1	1	–	5	–	1
Concordia (MN)	0	–	3	–	1	1	–	6	–	1
Saint Mary's (MN)	0	–	5	–	0	2	–	6	–	0
+ – Conference co-champions

1935 Missouri College Athletic Union football standings
	Conf.					Overall
Team	W		L		T	W		L		T
Missouri Valley $	3	–	1	–	0	6	–	3	–	0
Tarkio	2	–	1	–	0	3	–	2	–	0
Central (MO)	2	–	2	–	0	3	–	6	–	0
William Jewell	2	–	2	–	0	3	–	5	–	1
Culver–Stockton	0	–	3	–	0	2	–	4	–	2
$ – Conference champion

1935 Missouri Intercollegiate Athletic Association football standings
	Conf.					Overall
Team	W		L		T	W		L		T
Kirksville $	5	–	0	–	0	7	–	1	–	0
Cape Girardeau	3	–	2	–	0	7	–	2	–	0
Warrensburg	2	–	2	–	1	4	–	3	–	1
Springfield (MO)	2	–	2	–	1	3	–	4	–	1
Maryville (MO)	2	–	3	–	0	3	–	5	–	1
Rolla	0	–	5	–	0	1	–	7	–	0
$ – Conference champion

1935 Missouri Valley Conference football standings
	Conf.					Overall
Team	W		L		T	W		L		T
Washington University +	3	–	0	–	0	6	–	4	–	0
Tulsa +	3	–	0	–	0	3	–	6	–	1
Creighton	2	–	1	–	1	3	–	5	–	1
Drake	1	–	2	–	1	4	–	4	–	2
Washburn	1	–	2	–	0	4	–	6	–	0
Grinnell	1	–	2	–	0	3	–	5	–	1
Oklahoma A&M	0	–	3	–	0	3	–	7	–	0
+ – Conference co-champions

1935 Nebraska College Athletic Conference football standings
	Conf.					Overall
Team	W		L		T	W		L		T
Hastings $	3	–	1	–	0	6	–	4	–	0
Nebraska Wesleyan	2	–	1	–	1	5	–	3	–	1
Doane	2	–	2	–	0	0	–	6	–	3
Midland	1	–	2	–	1	2	–	2	–	3
York (NE)	1	–	3	–	0	6	–	4	–	0
$ – Conference champion

1935 Nebraska Intercollegiate Athletic Association football standings
	Conf.					Overall
Team	W		L		T	W		L		T
Omaha $	3	–	0	–	0	6	–	3	–	0
Kearney State	2	–	2	–	0	5	–	3	–	0
Wayne State (NE)	2	–	2	–	0	3	–	4	–	0
Peru State	1	–	3	–	0	2	–	5	–	1
Chadron State	1	–	3	–	0	2	–	5	–	0
$ – Conference champion

1935 New England Conference football standings
	Conf.					Overall
Team	W		L		T	W		L		T
Maine $	2	–	0	–	0	3	–	3	–	1
Rhode Island State	1	–	1	–	0	4	–	4	–	1
Connecticut State	0	–	1	–	0	2	–	4	–	1
New Hampshire	0	–	1	–	0	2	–	5	–	1
$ – Conference champion

1935 North Central Conference football standings
	Conf.					Overall
Team	W		L		T	W		L		T
North Dakota Agricultural $	4	–	0	–	1	7	–	1	–	1
North Dakota	3	–	0	–	2	6	–	2	–	2
Iowa State Teachers	2	–	0	–	0	6	–	3	–	0
South Dakota	2	–	2	–	1	5	–	3	–	1
South Dakota State	1	–	3	–	1	4	–	4	–	1
Omaha	1	–	3	–	0	6	–	3	–	0
Morningside	0	–	5	–	1	0	–	6	–	1
$ – Conference champion

1935 North Dakota Intercollegiate Athletic Conference football standings
	Conf.					Overall
Team	W		L		T	W		L		T
Jamestown $	4	–	0	–	1	5	–	1	–	1
Dickinson State	2	–	1	–	1	3	–	1	–	1
Valley City State	3	–	2	–	1	4	–	2	–	1
Mayville State	2	–	2	–	0	2	–	2	–	0
Minot State	1	–	1	–	2	1	–	2	–	3
Wahpeton	1	–	3	–	1	1	–	4	–	1
Ellendale	0	–	4	–	0	0	–	4	–	0
$ – Conference champion

1935 North State Conference football standings
	Conf.					Overall
Team	W		L		T	W		L		T
Elon $	3	–	0	–	0	6	–	3	–	0
Appalachian State	1	–	0	–	1	5	–	2	–	2
Catawba	3	–	1	–	0	8	–	2	–	0
Lenoir Rhyne	2	–	2	–	1	4	–	4	–	1
Guilford	1	–	3	–	0	1	–	9	–	0
Western Carolina	0	–	4	–	0	1	–	10	–	0
$ – Conference champion

1935 Northern Teachers College Conference football standings
	Conf.					Overall
Team	W		L		T	W		L		T
Moorhead State +	4	–	0	–	0	6	–	2	–	0
Mankato State +	4	–	0	–	0	5	–	2	–	0
Duluth State	2	–	2	–	0	4	–	2	–	0
St. Cloud State	2	–	3	–	0	2	–	5	–	0
Bemidji State	1	–	4	–	0	1	–	6	–	1
Winona State	0	–	4	–	0	0	–	8	–	0
+ – Conference co-champions

1935 Northwest Conference football standings
	Conf.					Overall
Team	W		L		T	W		L		T
Willamette $	4	–	0	–	0	5	–	2	–	0
Linfield	3	–	0	–	1	5	–	2	–	2
Whitman	3	–	2	–	1	6	–	2	–	1
College of Idaho	2	–	3	–	0	6	–	4	–	0
Puget Sound	1	–	2	–	1	4	–	4	–	1
Pacific (OR)	1	–	3	–	2	2	–	4	–	2
Albany (OR)	0	–	4	–	1	1	–	5	–	1
$ – Conference champion

1935 Ohio Athletic Conference football standings
	Conf.					Overall
Team	W		L		T	W		L		T
Baldwin–Wallace $	8	–	0	–	0	9	–	1	–	0
Mount Union	6	–	1	–	1	7	–	1	–	1
Toledo	4	–	1	–	0	6	–	2	–	1
Capital	5	–	2	–	0	5	–	2	–	0
Akron	6	–	3	–	0	6	–	3	–	0
Marietta	4	–	2	–	0	4	–	4	–	0
Case	3	–	2	–	0	3	–	6	–	0
Muskingum	4	–	3	–	0	5	–	4	–	0
Ohio Northern	3	–	3	–	1	4	–	3	–	1
Wooster	3	–	3	–	2	3	–	4	–	2
Kenyon	2	–	2	–	1	3	–	3	–	1
Denison	3	–	3	–	0	4	–	5	–	0
Heidelberg	3	–	3	–	2	3	–	4	–	2
Wittenberg	3	–	3	–	0	4	–	5	–	0
Oberlin	2	–	2	–	1	3	–	4	–	1
Kent State	3	–	5	–	0	3	–	5	–	0
Ashland	2	–	4	–	1	2	–	4	–	1
Findlay	1	–	3	–	0	4	–	4	–	0
Otterbein	1	–	6	–	1	1	–	6	–	1
Bowling Green	1	–	6	–	0	1	–	6	–	0
John Carroll	0	–	4	–	0	1	–	8	–	0
Hiram	0	–	6	–	0	0	–	8	–	0
$ – Conference champion

1935 Oklahoma Collegiate Conference football standings
	Conf.					Overall
Team	W		L		T	W		L		T
East Central +	4	–	1	–	0	7	–	2	–	0
Central State Teachers +	4	–	1	–	0	7	–	2	–	1
Northeastern State	2	–	2	–	1	4	–	3	–	1
SE Oklahoma State	2	–	2	–	1	4	–	4	–	2
NW Oklahoma State	1	–	3	–	1	3	–	5	–	1
SW Oklahoma State	0	–	4	–	1	2	–	6	–	2
+ – Conference co-champions

1935 Pennsylvania State Teachers Conference football standings
	Conf.					Overall
Team	W		L		T	W		L		T
Shippensburg $	6	–	1	–	0	7	–	1	–	0
West Chester	1	–	0	–	0	7	–	3	–	0
Lock Haven	5	–	2	–	1	5	–	2	–	1
Indiana (PA)	5	–	2	–	0	5	–	3	–	0
Slippery Rock	2	–	1	–	0	5	–	4	–	0
Bloomsburg	4	–	3	–	1	4	–	3	–	1
Mansfield	3	–	3	–	0	4	–	3	–	1
California (PA)	3	–	3	–	0	4	–	3	–	0
East Stroudsburg	1	–	2	–	0	3	–	5	–	0
Millersville	1	–	3	–	0	2	–	4	–	0
Clarion	1	–	4	–	0	1	–	6	–	0
Kutztown	0	–	3	–	0	3	–	5	–	0
Edinboro	0	–	5	–	0	0	–	6	–	0
$ – Conference champion

1935 Smoky Mountain Conference football standings
	Conf.					Overall
Team	W		L		T	W		L		T
Cumberland (TN) $	5	–	0	–	0	7	–	3	–	0
Carson–Newman	6	–	1	–	0	7	–	3	–	0
Appalachian State	3	–	2	–	0	5	–	2	–	2
East Tennessee State Teachers	4	–	3	–	0	5	–	3	–	0
Maryville (TN)	2	–	2	–	1	4	–	5	–	1
Milligan	2	–	3	–	1	2	–	5	–	1
King	1	–	3	–	1	2	–	5	–	2
Tusculum	0	–	5	–	1	2	–	5	–	1
Western Carolina	0	–	4	–	0	1	–	10	–	0
$ – Conference champion

1935 South Dakota Intercollegiate Conference football standings
	Conf.					Overall
Team	W		L		T	W		L		T
Spearfish +	5	–	0	–	0	8	–	0	–	0
Augustana (SD) +	5	–	0	–	0	7	–	2	–	0
Huron	5	–	1	–	0	5	–	2	–	0
Southern Normal	3	–	2	–	0	3	–	3	–	0
Sioux Falls	3	–	3	–	0	4	–	4	–	0
Dakota Wesleyan	2	–	3	–	0	3	–	4	–	0
Yankton	2	–	3	–	0	3	–	5	–	0
Northern Normal	1	–	5	–	0	2	–	6	–	0
Eastern Normal	0	–	4	–	0	0	–	5	–	0
South Dakota Mines	0	–	5	–	0	0	–	6	–	0
+ – Conference co-champions

1935 Southern California Conference football standings
	Conf.					Overall
Team	W		L		T	W		L		T
Whittier $	4	–	1	–	0	5	–	5	–	0
Redlands	3	–	1	–	1	7	–	1	–	1
Santa Barbara State	2	–	2	–	1	5	–	2	–	2
San Diego State	2	–	2	–	1	3	–	4	–	1
Occidental	1	–	2	–	1	3	–	3	–	2
La Verne	0	–	4	–	0	3	–	6	–	1
$ – Conference champion

1935 Southern Intercollegiate Athletic Association football standings
	Conf.					Overall
Team	W		L		T	W		L		T
Middle Tennessee State Teachers $	5	–	0	–	0	8	–	0	–	0
Howard (AL)	5	–	0	–	1	7	–	1	–	2
Furman	4	–	0	–	0	8	–	1	–	0
Centenary	3	–	0	–	0	6	–	5	–	0
Union (KY)	2	–	0	–	2	3	–	1	–	2
Southwestern (TN)	2	–	0	–	2	3	–	4	–	3
Louisiana Tech	7	–	1	–	0	8	–	1	–	0
Mississippi State Teachers	5	–	1	–	0	6	–	4	–	0
Stetson	4	–	1	–	0	7	–	2	–	0
The Citadel	4	–	1	–	0	4	–	3	–	1
Transylvania	3	–	1	–	0	5	–	3	–	0
Georgetown (KY)	3	–	1	–	1	5	–	2	–	1
Western Kentucky State Teachers	5	–	2	–	0	7	–	3	–	0
Wofford	3	–	2	–	1	4	–	4	–	1
Louisiana College	4	–	4	–	0	6	–	4	–	0
Miami (FL)	1	–	1	–	0	5	–	3	–	0
Millsaps	2	–	2	–	1	4	–	4	–	2
Mercer	1	–	1	–	0	4	–	5	–	0
Centre	1	–	1	–	0	1	–	7	–	1
Union (TN)	2	–	3	–	1	6	–	4	–	1
Eastern Kentucky State Teachers	2	–	3	–	1	4	–	4	–	1
Murray State	2	–	4	–	0	4	–	5	–	0
Presbyterian	2	–	4	–	0	2	–	7	–	0
Rollins	1	–	3	–	0	2	–	5	–	0
Loyola (LA)	1	–	3	–	0	2	–	6	–	1
Newberry	1	–	4	–	0	2	–	8	–	0
SW Louisiana	1	–	4	–	0	2	–	8	–	0
Louisville	1	–	4	–	0	1	–	6	–	1
Louisiana Normal	1	–	5	–	0	2	–	9	–	0
West Tennessee State Teachers	0	–	3	–	1	1	–	6	–	1
Erskine	0	–	4	–	1	1	–	6	–	1
Mississippi College	0	–	5	–	1	2	–	6	–	1
Tennessee Tech	0	–	5	–	1	1	–	6	–	1
Morehead State	0	–	5	–	0	1	–	6	–	0
$ – Conference champion

1935 Southern Intercollegiate Athletic Conference football standings
	Conf.					Overall
Team	W		L		T	W		L		T
Alabama State $	6	–	0	–	1	9	–	1	–	1
Morehouse	5	–	1	–	1	5	–	1	–	1
Tuskegee	5	–	2	–	0	8	–	4	–	0
Clark (GA)	2	–	1	–	2	2	–	2	–	3
LeMoyne	3	–	2	–	0	5	–	3	–	1
Florida A&M	2	–	4	–	0	4	–	5	–	0
Morris Brown	2	–	2	–	2	3	–	4	–	2
South Carolina State	2	–	3	–	0	4	–	4	–	0
Fisk	1	–	4	–	0	1	–	4	–	1
Knoxville	0	–	5	–	1	1	–	5	–	3
Talladega	1	–	2	–	1	2	–	2	–	2
Benedict	0	–	3	–	0	1	–	5	–	2
$ – Conference champion; Standings were based on Dickinson System ratings. Benedict and Talladega were not rated because they did not play the quota of five conference games.

1935 Southwestern Athletic Conference football standings
	Conf.					Overall
Team	W		L		T	W		L		T
Texas College $	5	–	0	–	1	9	–	0	–	1
Wiley	3	–	0	–	3	8	–	0	–	3
Bishop	3	–	2	–	1	7	–	2	–	1
Prairie View	1	–	1	–	4	4	–	3	–	4
Langston	1	–	3	–	2	2	–	3	–	2
Southern	1	–	4	–	1	1	–	7	–	1
Samuel Huston	1	–	5	–	0	1	–	6	–	0
$ – Conference champion

1935 Texas Conference football standings
	Conf.					Overall
Team	W		L		T	W		L		T
Austin $	4	–	0	–	2	7	–	2	–	2
McMurry	4	–	2	–	0	6	–	3	–	0
Howard Payne	3	–	1	–	3	5	–	2	–	3
Trinity (TX)	2	–	2	–	1	4	–	3	–	1
Daniel Baker	2	–	3	–	1	4	–	5	–	2
Abilene Christian	1	–	4	–	1	1	–	6	–	3
Southwestern (TX)	1	–	4	–	1	1	–	8	–	1
St. Edward's	1	–	4	–	1	3	–	5	–	1
Hardin–Simmons *	2	–	0	–	0	6	–	3	–	1
$ – Conference champion; * – did not compete for championship

1935 Tri-State Intercollegiate Conference football standings
	Conf.					Overall
Team	W		L		T	W		L		T
Milton $	5	–	0	–	0	6	–	0	–	0
Northwestern (WI)	3	–	1	–	1	4	–	2	–	1
Aurora	3	–	1	–	1	3	–	2	–	2
Wisconsin Mines	2	–	3	–	0	2	–	3	–	0
Wartburg	0	–	4	–	0	0	–	4	–	0
Mission House	0	–	4	–	0	0	–	7	–	0
$ – Conference champion

1935 West Virginia Athletic Conference football standings
	Conf.					Overall
Team	W		L		T	W		L		T
West Virginia Wesleyan $	4	–	0	–	0	7	–	2	–	1
Salem	6	–	1	–	0	6	–	2	–	0
West Liberty State	5	–	2	–	0	7	–	2	–	0
Concord	3	–	4	–	0	4	–	4	–	0
Glenville State	3	–	4	–	0	4	–	4	–	0
Morris Harvey	2	–	4	–	0	2	–	7	–	0
Fairmont State	2	–	5	–	0	2	–	6	–	0
Shepherd	1	–	3	–	1	1	–	6	–	1
New River State	0	–	4	–	0	1	–	5	–	0
Bethany (WV) *	1	–	0	–	0	5	–	3	–	0
Marshall *	2	–	1	–	0	4	–	6	–	0
Potomac State *	1	–	1	–	1	1	–	4	–	1
Davis & Elkins *	1	–	2	–	0	2	–	7	–	0
$ – Conference champion; * – Did not qualify for conference standings Ties did not count in conference standings.

1935 Wisconsin State Teachers College Conference football standings
	Conf.					Overall
Team	W		L		T	W		L		T
Northern Division
Superior State x	4	–	0	–	0	7	–	1	–	0
River Falls State	2	–	1	–	1	4	–	2	–	1
Eau Claire State	1	–	1	–	2	2	–	3	–	2
La Crosse State	1	–	2	–	1	3	–	4	–	1
Stout Institute	0	–	4	–	0	1	–	6	–	0
Southern Division
Oshkosh State x	4	–	0	–	0	6	–	0	–	1
Whitewater State	3	–	1	–	0	4	–	2	–	0
Milwaukee State	2	–	2	–	0	4	–	3	–	0
Platteville State	1	–	3	–	0	1	–	4	–	0
Stevens Point State	0	–	4	–	0	2	–	5	–	0
x – Division champion/co-champions

== Rankings ==
A poll of 142 newspaper writers, taken at year's end—by United Press International (known as United Press Associations at the time)—concluded that Minnesota was the best in the nation. Alan J. Gould, creator of the AP writer's poll that would begin in the following year, named Minnesota, Princeton, and SMU co-champions.

Years later, other selectors recognized as "major" by the NCAA, the Billingsley Report, the Helms Athletic Foundation title, and National Championship Foundation, retroactively selected Minnesota as national champion. Modern selectors, the Sagarin Ratings and Berryman Quality Point Rating System (Berryman QPRS), retroactively deemed SMU as national champion.

== Bowl games ==
Rankings from the Dickinson System

Bowl game	Winning team		Losing team	
Rose Bowl	No. 5 Stanford	7	No. 1 SMU	0
Sugar Bowl	No. 8 TCU	3	No. 4 LSU	2
Orange Bowl	Catholic University	20	Ole Miss	19
Sun Bowl	Hardin–Simmons	14	New Mexico A&M	14

The Rose Bowl matched unbeaten Southwest Conference champion SMU (12–0) against Pacific Coast Conference co-champion Stanford (7–1) before a crowd of 86,000. Stanford has lost the two previous Rose Bowls, falling to Columbia in the 1934 Rose Bowl and 1934 Alabama Crimson Tide football team the 1935 game. Determined not three-peat, the Stanford scored an early touchdown and held off the Mustangs to win 7–0.

In New Orleans, the second annual Sugar Bowl pitted TCU (11–1) against Southeastern Conference champion LSU (9–1) before a crowd of 38,000. TCU's Sammy Baugh was forced out of the end zone on a pass attempt, and the safety gave LSU a 2–0 lead. Two minutes later, Baugh drove the Frogs to the 17-yard line, setting up Taldon Malton's field goal. The final score was TCU 3, LSU 2

In Miami, the second annual Orange Bowl matched Ole Miss (9–2) against unheralded Catholic University (8–1). A crowd of 10,000 watched Catholic take an early lead and pull off a 20–19 upset. The Sun Bowl matched two colleges for the first time, as New Mexico A&M and Hardin–Simmons battled to a 14–14 tie.

== Awards and honors ==
=== Statistical leaders ===
- Points scored: Ray Zeh, Case Western Reserve, 112

=== Heisman Trophy ===
1935 was the first year that the Heisman Trophy was ever awarded, although it was named differently in the first year. In 1935, it was presented by the Downtown Athletic Club (DAC) in Manhattan, New York, a privately owned recreation facility near the site of the former World Trade Center. It was first known simply as the "DAC Trophy" for this inaugural year. The first winner, Jay Berwanger of the University of Chicago, was drafted by the Philadelphia Eagles but declined to sign for them. He never played professional football for any team. In 1936, John Heisman died and the trophy was renamed in his honor. Larry Kelley, the second winner of the award was the first man to win it officially named as the "Heisman Trophy."

Voting

Player	School	Position	Total
Jay Berwanger	Chicago	HB	84
Monk Meyer	Army	HB	29
William Shakespeare	Notre Dame	HB	23
Pepper Constable	Princeton	HB	20

== See also ==
- 1935 College Football All-America Team
