= 1935 Hardin–Simmons Cowboys football team =

American college football season

1935 Hardin–Simmons Cowboys football

Sun Bowl, T 14–14 vs. New Mexico A&M
- Conference: Texas Conference
- Record: 6–3–1 (2–0 Texas)
- Head coach: Frank Kimbrough (1st season)

1935 Texas Conference football standings
	Conf.					Overall
Team	W		L		T	W		L		T
Austin $	4	–	0	–	2	7	–	2	–	2
McMurry	4	–	2	–	0	6	–	3	–	0
Howard Payne	3	–	1	–	3	5	–	2	–	3
Trinity (TX)	2	–	2	–	1	4	–	3	–	1
Daniel Baker	2	–	3	–	1	4	–	5	–	2
Abilene Christian	1	–	4	–	1	1	–	6	–	3
Southwestern (TX)	1	–	4	–	1	1	–	8	–	1
St. Edward's	1	–	4	–	1	3	–	5	–	1
Hardin–Simmons *	2	–	0	–	0	6	–	3	–	1
$ – Conference champion; * – did not compete for championship

The 1935 Hardin–Simmons Cowboys football team was an American football team that represented Hardin–Simmons University during the 1935 college football season. In its first season under head coach Frank Kimbrough, the team compiled a 6–3–1 record, tied with New Mexico A&M in the 1936 Sun Bowl, and outscored all opponents by a total of 182 to 64.

== Schedule ==
Date	Opponent	Site	Result	Attendance	Source
September 20	Texas Tech*	Parramore Field; Abilene, TX	L 0–9	6,500	
September 28	at Baylor*	Carroll Field; Waco, TX	L 0–14		
October 4	St. Edward's	Parramore Field; Abilene, TX	W 21–0		
October 11	at Morningside*	Stock Yards Park; Sioux City, IA	W 32–0	2,000	
October 26	vs. SMU*	Coyote Stadium; Wichita Falls, TX	L 6–18	4,000	
November 1	Sul Ross*	Parramore Field; Abilene, TX	W 15–9		
November 11	Texas A&I*	Parramore Field; Abilene, TX	W 34–0		
November 16	at Howard Payne	Brownwood, TX	W 14–0		
November 23	at Texas Mines*	Kidd Field; El Paso, TX	W 46–0		
January 1, 1936	vs. New Mexico A&M*	Jones Stadium; El Paso, TX (Sun Bowl)	T 14–14	11,000	
*Non-conference game
