= 1935 Carnegie Tech Tartans football team =

American college football season

1935 Carnegie Tech Tartans football
- Conference: Independent
- Record: 2–5–1
- Head coach: Howard Harpster (3rd season)

1935 Eastern college football independents records
	Conf.			Overall
Team	W	L	T	W		L		T
No. 3 Princeton		–		9	–	0	–	0
No. 14 Holy Cross		–		9	–	0	–	1
NYU		–		7	–	1	–	0
Dartmouth		–		8	–	2	–	0
Northeastern		–		5	–	0	–	3
Syracuse		–		6	–	1	–	1
No. 10 Pittsburgh		–		7	–	1	–	2
No. 11 Fordham		–		6	–	1	–	2
Villanova		–		7	–	2	–	0
Franklin & Marshall		–		7	–	2	–	1
Providence		–		6	–	2	–	0
No. 18 Army		–		6	–	2	–	1
Colgate		–		7	–	3	–	0
Temple		–		7	–	3	–	0
Boston College		–		6	–	3	–	0
Bucknell		–		6	–	3	–	0
Duquesne		–		6	–	3	–	0
Yale		–		6	–	3	–	0
CCNY		–		4	–	3	–	0
Manhattan		–		5	–	3	–	1
Massachusetts State		–		5	–	4	–	0
La Salle		–		4	–	4	–	1
Penn		–		4	–	4	–	0
Penn State		–		4	–	4	–	0
Columbia		–		4	–	4	–	1
Vermont		–		4	–	5	–	0
Boston University		–		3	–	4	–	2
Harvard		–		3	–	5	–	0
Carnegie Tech		–		2	–	5	–	1
Buffalo		–		2	–	6	–	0
Tufts		–		1	–	5	–	2
Brown		–		1	–	8	–	0
Cornell		–		0	–	6	–	1
Rankings from United Press

The 1935 Carnegie Tech Tartans football team represented the Carnegie Institute of Technology—now known as Carnegie Mellon University—as an independent during the 1935 college football season. Led by third-year head coach Howard Harpster, the Tartans compiled a record of 2–5–1.

== Schedule ==
Date	Opponent	Site	Result	Attendance	Source
September 28	Case	Pittsburgh, PA	W 6–3		
October 5	Notre Dame	Pittsburgh, PA	L 3–14	27,542–40,000	
October 12	at NYU	Yankee Stadium; Bronx, NY	L 6–25	15,000	
October 19	Temple	Pittsburgh, PA	L 0–13		
October 26	at Purdue	Ross–Ade Stadium; West Lafayette, IN	W 7–0	17,000	
November 2	Duquesne	Pittsburgh, PA	L 0–7		
November 16	at Holy Cross	Fitton Field; Worcester, MA	L 0–7		
November 28	at Pittsburgh	Pitt Stadium; Pittsburgh, PA	T 0–0	35,562	
