= 1935 Buffalo Bulls football team =

American college football season

1935 Buffalo Bulls football
- Conference: Independent
- Record: 2–6
- Head coach: George Van Bibber (2nd season)
- Captains: John Rappole; Sig Pelson
- Home stadium: Rotary Field

1935 Eastern college football independents records
| | Conf. | | | Overall |
| Team | W | L | T | W | | L | | T |
|---|---|---|---|---|---|---|---|---|
| No. 3 Princeton | | – | | 9 | – | 0 | – | 0 |
| No. 14 Holy Cross | | – | | 9 | – | 0 | – | 1 |
| NYU | | – | | 7 | – | 1 | – | 0 |
| Dartmouth | | – | | 8 | – | 2 | – | 0 |
| Northeastern | | – | | 5 | – | 0 | – | 3 |
| Syracuse | | – | | 6 | – | 1 | – | 1 |
| No. 10 Pittsburgh | | – | | 7 | – | 1 | – | 2 |
| No. 11 Fordham | | – | | 6 | – | 1 | – | 2 |
| Villanova | | – | | 7 | – | 2 | – | 0 |
| Franklin & Marshall | | – | | 7 | – | 2 | – | 1 |
| Providence | | – | | 6 | – | 2 | – | 0 |
| No. 18 Army | | – | | 6 | – | 2 | – | 1 |
| Colgate | | – | | 7 | – | 3 | – | 0 |
| Temple | | – | | 7 | – | 3 | – | 0 |
| Boston College | | – | | 6 | – | 3 | – | 0 |
| Bucknell | | – | | 6 | – | 3 | – | 0 |
| Duquesne | | – | | 6 | – | 3 | – | 0 |
| Yale | | – | | 6 | – | 3 | – | 0 |
| CCNY | | – | | 4 | – | 3 | – | 0 |
| Manhattan | | – | | 5 | – | 3 | – | 1 |
| Massachusetts State | | – | | 5 | – | 4 | – | 0 |
| La Salle | | – | | 4 | – | 4 | – | 1 |
| Penn | | – | | 4 | – | 4 | – | 0 |
| Penn State | | – | | 4 | – | 4 | – | 0 |
| Columbia | | – | | 4 | – | 4 | – | 1 |
| Vermont | | – | | 4 | – | 5 | – | 0 |
| Boston University | | – | | 3 | – | 4 | – | 2 |
| Harvard | | – | | 3 | – | 5 | – | 0 |
| Carnegie Tech | | – | | 2 | – | 5 | – | 1 |
| Buffalo | | – | | 2 | – | 6 | – | 0 |
| Tufts | | – | | 1 | – | 5 | – | 2 |
| Brown | | – | | 1 | – | 8 | – | 0 |
| Cornell | | – | | 0 | – | 6 | – | 1 |
Rankings from United Press

The 1935 Buffalo Bulls football team was an American football team that represented the University at Buffalo as an independent during the 1935 college football season. In its second and final season under head coach George Van Bibber, the team compiled a 2–6 record. The team played its home games at Rotary Field in Buffalo, New York.

== Schedule ==
| Date | Opponent | Site | Result | Attendance | Source |
|---|---|---|---|---|---|
| September 28 | Baldwin–Wallace | Rotary Field; Buffalo, NY | L 0–55 | | |
| October 5 | at Hamilton | Steuben Field; Clinton, NY | L 0–20 | | |
| October 12 | at Western Reserve | League Park; Cleveland, OH | L 0–61 | | |
| October 19 | Alfred | Rotary Field; Buffalo, NY | W 7–0 | | |
| October 26 | Wayne | Rotary Field; Buffalo, NY | L 0–14 | | |
| November 2 | Clarkson | Rotary Field; Buffalo, NY | L 0–32 | 1,200 | |
| November 9 | at Hobart | Geneva, NY | W 13–12 | | |
| November 16 | at Toledo | Toledo, OH | L 6–18 | | |
