= 1935 Harvard Crimson football team =

American college football season

1935 Harvard Crimson football
- Conference: Independent
- Record: 3–5
- Head coach: Dick Harlow (1st season)
- Home stadium: Harvard Stadium

1935 Eastern college football independents records
	Conf.			Overall
Team	W	L	T	W		L		T
No. 3 Princeton		–		9	–	0	–	0
No. 14 Holy Cross		–		9	–	0	–	1
NYU		–		7	–	1	–	0
Dartmouth		–		8	–	2	–	0
Northeastern		–		5	–	0	–	3
Syracuse		–		6	–	1	–	1
No. 10 Pittsburgh		–		7	–	1	–	2
No. 11 Fordham		–		6	–	1	–	2
Villanova		–		7	–	2	–	0
Franklin & Marshall		–		7	–	2	–	1
Providence		–		6	–	2	–	0
No. 18 Army		–		6	–	2	–	1
Colgate		–		7	–	3	–	0
Temple		–		7	–	3	–	0
Boston College		–		6	–	3	–	0
Bucknell		–		6	–	3	–	0
Duquesne		–		6	–	3	–	0
Yale		–		6	–	3	–	0
CCNY		–		4	–	3	–	0
Manhattan		–		5	–	3	–	1
Massachusetts State		–		5	–	4	–	0
La Salle		–		4	–	4	–	1
Penn		–		4	–	4	–	0
Penn State		–		4	–	4	–	0
Columbia		–		4	–	4	–	1
Vermont		–		4	–	5	–	0
Boston University		–		3	–	4	–	2
Harvard		–		3	–	5	–	0
Carnegie Tech		–		2	–	5	–	1
Buffalo		–		2	–	6	–	0
Tufts		–		1	–	5	–	2
Brown		–		1	–	8	–	0
Cornell		–		0	–	6	–	1
Rankings from United Press

The 1935 Harvard Crimson football team was an American football team that represented Harvard University as an independent during the 1935 college football season. In its first season under head coach Dick Harlow, the team compiled a 3–5 record and outscored opponents by a total of 107 to 89. The team played its home games at Harvard Stadium in Boston.

== Schedule ==
Date	Opponent	Site	Result	Attendance	Source
October 5	Springfield (MA)	Harvard Stadium; Boston, MA	W 20–0		
October 12	Holy Cross	Harvard Stadium; Boston, MA	L 0–13		
October 19	at Army	Michie Stadium; West Point, NY	L 0–13		
October 26	Dartmouth	Harvard Stadium; Boston, MA (rivalry)	L 6–14		
November 2	Brown	Harvard Stadium; Boston, MA	W 33–0		
November 9	at Princeton	Palmer Stadium; Princeton, NJ	L 0–35	50,000	
November 16	New Hampshire	Harvard Stadium; Boston, MA	W 41–0	7,000	
November 23	Yale	Harvard Stadium; Boston, MA (rivalry)	L 7–14		
