= 1935 Rhode Island State Rams football team =

American college football season

1935 Rhode Island State Rams football
- Conference: New England Conference
- Record: 4–4–1 (1–1 New England)
- Head coach: Frank Keaney (16th season)

1935 New England Conference football standings
	Conf.					Overall
Team	W		L		T	W		L		T
Maine $	2	–	0	–	0	3	–	3	–	1
Rhode Island State	1	–	1	–	0	4	–	4	–	1
Connecticut State	0	–	1	–	0	2	–	4	–	1
New Hampshire	0	–	1	–	0	2	–	5	–	1
$ – Conference champion

The 1935 Rhode Island Rams football team was an American football team that represented Rhode Island State College (later renamed the University of Rhode Island) as a member of the New England Conference during the 1935 college football season. In its 16th season under head coach Frank Keaney, the team compiled a 4–4–1 record (1–1 against conference opponents) and finished in second place in the conference.

== Schedule ==
Date	Opponent	Site	Result	Attendance	Source
September 21	at Holy Cross*	Fitton Field; Worcester, MA	L 0–32	7,000	
September 28	at Maine	Alumni Field; Orono, ME	L 0–7		
October 5	at Brown*	Providence, RI (rivalry)	W 13–7	7,500	
October 12	at Northeastern*	Brookline, MA	T 6–6	4,000	
October 19	Massachusetts State*	Kingston, RI	L 6–7	2,000	
October 26	Coast Guard*	Kingston, RI	W 13–7		
November 2	at Worcester Tech*	Worcester, MA	W 23–6		
November 9	Connecticut State^{†}	Kingston, RI (rivalry)	W 7–0		
November 16	at Providence*	Hendricken Field; Providence, RI	L 0–13		
*Non-conference game; ^{†}Homecoming
