= 1935 CCNY Beavers football team =

American college football season

1935 CCNY Beavers football
- Conference: Independent
- Record: 4–3
- Head coach: Benny Friedman (2nd season)
- Home stadium: Lewisohn Stadium

1935 Eastern college football independents records
	Conf.			Overall
Team	W	L	T	W		L		T
No. 3 Princeton		–		9	–	0	–	0
No. 14 Holy Cross		–		9	–	0	–	1
NYU		–		7	–	1	–	0
Dartmouth		–		8	–	2	–	0
Northeastern		–		5	–	0	–	3
Syracuse		–		6	–	1	–	1
No. 10 Pittsburgh		–		7	–	1	–	2
No. 11 Fordham		–		6	–	1	–	2
Villanova		–		7	–	2	–	0
Franklin & Marshall		–		7	–	2	–	1
Providence		–		6	–	2	–	0
No. 18 Army		–		6	–	2	–	1
Colgate		–		7	–	3	–	0
Temple		–		7	–	3	–	0
Boston College		–		6	–	3	–	0
Bucknell		–		6	–	3	–	0
Duquesne		–		6	–	3	–	0
Yale		–		6	–	3	–	0
CCNY		–		4	–	3	–	0
Manhattan		–		5	–	3	–	1
Massachusetts State		–		5	–	4	–	0
La Salle		–		4	–	4	–	1
Penn		–		4	–	4	–	0
Penn State		–		4	–	4	–	0
Columbia		–		4	–	4	–	1
Vermont		–		4	–	5	–	0
Boston University		–		3	–	4	–	2
Harvard		–		3	–	5	–	0
Carnegie Tech		–		2	–	5	–	1
Buffalo		–		2	–	6	–	0
Tufts		–		1	–	5	–	2
Brown		–		1	–	8	–	0
Cornell		–		0	–	6	–	1
Rankings from United Press

The 1935 CCNY Beavers football team was an American football team that represented the City College of New York (CCNY) as an independent during the 1935 college football season. In their second season under head coach Benny Friedman, the team compiled a 4–3 record.

== Schedule ==
Date	Opponent	Site	Result	Attendance	Source
September 28	Brooklyn	Lewisohn Stadium; New York, NY	W 20–6	3,000	
October 5	St. Francis (NY)	Lewisohn Stadium; New York, NY	W 14–0		
October 12	Providence	Lewisohn Stadium; New York, NY	L 0–14		
October 19	Lowell Textile	Lewisohn Stadium; New York, NY	W 19–0	3,000	
October 26	at Drexel	Drexel Field; Philadelphia, PA	W 14–0	3,000	
November 2	at Manhattan	Ebbets Field; Brooklyn, NY	L 0–65		
November 9	at NYU	Yankee Stadium; Bronx, NY	L 0–45	6,000	
