= 1935 La Salle Explorers football team =

American college football season

1935 La Salle Explorers football
- Conference: Independent
- Record: 4–4–1
- Head coach: Marty Brill (3rd season)
- Home stadium: Temple Stadium; Philadelphia Ball Park

1935 Eastern college football independents records
	Conf.			Overall
Team	W	L	T	W		L		T
No. 3 Princeton		–		9	–	0	–	0
No. 14 Holy Cross		–		9	–	0	–	1
NYU		–		7	–	1	–	0
Dartmouth		–		8	–	2	–	0
Northeastern		–		5	–	0	–	3
Syracuse		–		6	–	1	–	1
No. 10 Pittsburgh		–		7	–	1	–	2
No. 11 Fordham		–		6	–	1	–	2
Villanova		–		7	–	2	–	0
Franklin & Marshall		–		7	–	2	–	1
Providence		–		6	–	2	–	0
No. 18 Army		–		6	–	2	–	1
Colgate		–		7	–	3	–	0
Temple		–		7	–	3	–	0
Boston College		–		6	–	3	–	0
Bucknell		–		6	–	3	–	0
Duquesne		–		6	–	3	–	0
Yale		–		6	–	3	–	0
CCNY		–		4	–	3	–	0
Manhattan		–		5	–	3	–	1
Massachusetts State		–		5	–	4	–	0
La Salle		–		4	–	4	–	1
Penn		–		4	–	4	–	0
Penn State		–		4	–	4	–	0
Columbia		–		4	–	4	–	1
Vermont		–		4	–	5	–	0
Boston University		–		3	–	4	–	2
Harvard		–		3	–	5	–	0
Carnegie Tech		–		2	–	5	–	1
Buffalo		–		2	–	6	–	0
Tufts		–		1	–	5	–	2
Brown		–		1	–	8	–	0
Cornell		–		0	–	6	–	1
Rankings from United Press

The 1935 La Salle Explorers football team was an American football team that represented La Salle College (now known as La Salle University) as an independent during the 1935 college football season. In their third year under head coach Marty Brill, the Explorers compiled a 4–4–1 record.

== Schedule ==
Date	Time	Opponent	Site	Result	Attendance	Source
September 28		Davis & Elkins	Temple Stadium; Philadelphia, PA	W 14–0	2,000	
October 5	2:30 p.m.	at Catholic University	Brookland Stadium; Washington, DC	L 7–41	4,500	
October 12		at Ursinus	Collegeville, PA	W 18–0		
October 19		at Villanova	Villanova Stadium; Villanova, PA	L 0–20	10,000	
October 26		at West Chester	Wayne Field; West Chester, PA	W 7–0		
November 3		St. Thomas (PA)	Philadelphia Ball Park; Philadelphia, PA	L 13–14	1,000	
November 9		at Manhattan	Ebbets Field; Brooklyn, NY	L 13–54	7,500	
November 16		vs. St. Bonaventure	Parkway Field; Bradford, PA	T 7–7		
November 24		Saint Joseph's	Philadelphia Ball Park; Philadelphia, PA	W 14–7	7,000	
All times are in Eastern time
