= 1935 Boston University Terriers football team =

American college football season

1935 Boston University Terriers football
- Conference: Independent
- Record: 3–4–2
- Head coach: Pat Hanley (2nd season)
- Home stadium: Nickerson Field

1935 Eastern college football independents records
	Conf.			Overall
Team	W	L	T	W		L		T
No. 3 Princeton		–		9	–	0	–	0
No. 14 Holy Cross		–		9	–	0	–	1
NYU		–		7	–	1	–	0
Dartmouth		–		8	–	2	–	0
Northeastern		–		5	–	0	–	3
Syracuse		–		6	–	1	–	1
No. 10 Pittsburgh		–		7	–	1	–	2
No. 11 Fordham		–		6	–	1	–	2
Villanova		–		7	–	2	–	0
Franklin & Marshall		–		7	–	2	–	1
Providence		–		6	–	2	–	0
No. 18 Army		–		6	–	2	–	1
Colgate		–		7	–	3	–	0
Temple		–		7	–	3	–	0
Boston College		–		6	–	3	–	0
Bucknell		–		6	–	3	–	0
Duquesne		–		6	–	3	–	0
Yale		–		6	–	3	–	0
CCNY		–		4	–	3	–	0
Manhattan		–		5	–	3	–	1
Massachusetts State		–		5	–	4	–	0
La Salle		–		4	–	4	–	1
Penn		–		4	–	4	–	0
Penn State		–		4	–	4	–	0
Columbia		–		4	–	4	–	1
Vermont		–		4	–	5	–	0
Boston University		–		3	–	4	–	2
Harvard		–		3	–	5	–	0
Carnegie Tech		–		2	–	5	–	1
Buffalo		–		2	–	6	–	0
Tufts		–		1	–	5	–	2
Brown		–		1	–	8	–	0
Cornell		–		0	–	6	–	1
Rankings from United Press

The 1935 Boston University Terriers football team was an American football team that represented Boston University as an independent during the 1935 college football season. In its second season under head coach Pat Hanley, the team compiled a 3–4–2 record and was outscored by a total of 87 to 77.

== Schedule ==
Date	Time	Opponent	Site	Result	Attendance	Source
October 5	2:00 p.m.	Toledo	Nickerson Field; Weston, MA	W 6–0		
October 12		at Tufts	Tufts Oval; Medford, MA	W 13–7		
October 19		Bates	Nickerson Field; Weston, MA	T 6–6		
October 26		Vermont	Nickerson Field; Weston, MA	W 40–6	5,000	
November 2		at New Hampshire	Memorial Field; Durham, NH	T 0–0	5,000	
November 9		Rutgers	Fenway Park; Boston, MA	L 6–12	5,000	
November 16		at Brown	Brown Stadium; Providence, RI	L 0–14	3,000	
November 23		at Boston College	Alumni Field; Chestnut Hill, MA (rivalry)	L 6–25		
November 29		at Miami (FL)	Miami Stadium; Miami, FL	L 0–17	4,000	
All times are in Eastern time
