= 1935–36 NCAA football bowl games =

College football postseason game series

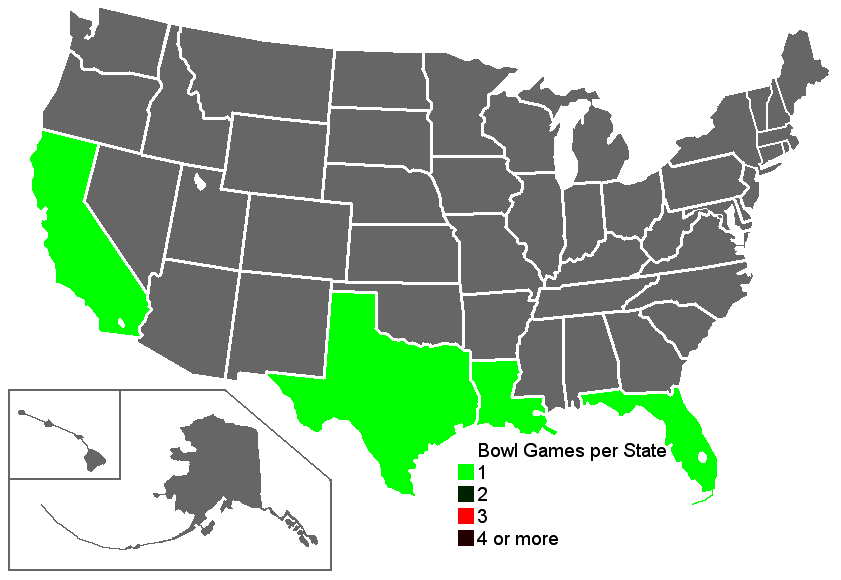
- Number of bowl games per state
- Season: 1935
- Regular season: September 21–November 30
- Number of bowls: 4
- All-star games: East–West Shrine Game
- Bowl games: January 1, 1936
- Champions: SMU Mustangs (Dickinson); Princeton Tigers (Dunkel)
Bowl record by conference
Conference	Bowls	Record	Final AP poll
Independents	2	1–0–1 (0.750)	—
SWC	2	1–1 (0.500)	—
SEC	2	0–2 (0.000)	—
Pacific Coast	1	1–0 (1.000)	—
Border	1	0–0–1 (0.500)	—
Big Six	0	0–0 (–)	—
Big Ten	0	0–0 (–)	—
Rocky Mountain	0	0–0 (–)	—
Southern	0	0–0 (–)	—
- Note: There was no AP poll this season.

The 1935–36 NCAA football bowl games were the final games of the National Collegiate Athletic Association (NCAA) 1935 college football season, and included the debut of the Sun Bowl being played with collegiate teams, which complemented the Orange, Rose, and Sugar Bowl as the fourth post-season game. Both Southeastern Conference (SEC) teams, LSU and Ole Miss, suffered single-point defeats.

Of this season's eight bowl teams, two—the Catholic University Cardinals and Hardin–Simmons Cowboys—now compete in the NCAA's lowest level of competition, Division III, while another—the New Mexico State Aggies—still compete at the highest level but have one of the lowest winning percentages in the Football Bowl Subdivision.

== Poll rankings ==
No AP poll for college football was taken this season; it did not become a regular occurrence until the 1936 season. Contemporary polls named different national champions; the Dickinson System chose SMU, while the Dunkel System selected Princeton.

== Bowl schedule ==
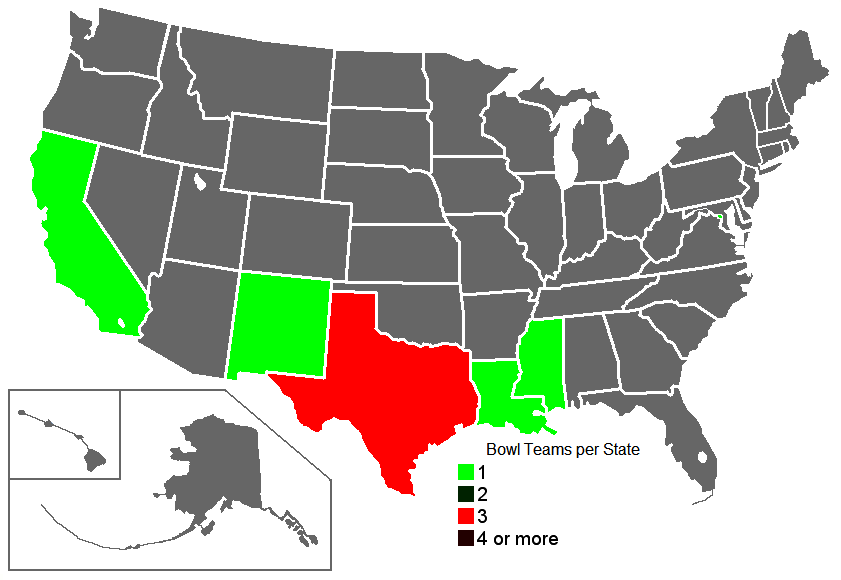
Number of bowl teams per state. The Catholic University Cardinals are from Washington, D.C.

Date	Game	Site	Teams	Affiliations	Results
Jan. 1	Rose Bowl	Rose Bowl; Pasadena, California	Stanford Indians (7–1); SMU Mustangs (12–0)	PCC; SWC	Stanford 7 SMU 0
Jan. 1	Sugar Bowl	Tulane Stadium; New Orleans, Louisiana	TCU Horned Frogs (11–1); LSU Tigers (9–1)	SWC; SEC	TCU 3 LSU 2
Jan. 1	Orange Bowl	Miami Field; Miami, Florida	Catholic University Cardinals (7–1); Ole Miss Rebels (9–2)	Independent; SEC	Catholic 20; Ole Miss 19
Jan. 1	Sun Bowl	Jones Stadium; El Paso, Texas	New Mexico State Aggies (6–1–2); Hardin–Simmons Cowboys (6–3)	Border; Independent	New Mexico State 14; Hardin–Simmons 14

=== Conference performance in bowl games ===
Conference	Games	Record				Bowls		
Conference	Games	W	L	T	Pct.	Won	Lost	Tied
Independents	2	1	0	1	.750	Orange	—	Sun
SWC	2	1	1	0	.500	Sugar	Rose	—
SEC	2	0	2	0	.000	—	Sugar, Orange	—
Pacific Coast	1	1	0	0	1.000	Rose	—	—
Border	1	0	0	1	.500	—	—	Sun

== See also ==
- Prairie View Bowl
