= 1935 Vermont Catamounts football team =

American college football season

1935 Vermont Catamounts football
- Conference: Independent
- Record: 4–5
- Head coach: John P. Sabo (2nd season)
- Home stadium: Centennial Field

1935 Eastern college football independents records
	Conf.			Overall
Team	W	L	T	W		L		T
No. 3 Princeton		–		9	–	0	–	0
No. 14 Holy Cross		–		9	–	0	–	1
NYU		–		7	–	1	–	0
Dartmouth		–		8	–	2	–	0
Northeastern		–		5	–	0	–	3
Syracuse		–		6	–	1	–	1
No. 10 Pittsburgh		–		7	–	1	–	2
No. 11 Fordham		–		6	–	1	–	2
Villanova		–		7	–	2	–	0
Franklin & Marshall		–		7	–	2	–	1
Providence		–		6	–	2	–	0
No. 18 Army		–		6	–	2	–	1
Colgate		–		7	–	3	–	0
Temple		–		7	–	3	–	0
Boston College		–		6	–	3	–	0
Bucknell		–		6	–	3	–	0
Duquesne		–		6	–	3	–	0
Yale		–		6	–	3	–	0
CCNY		–		4	–	3	–	0
Manhattan		–		5	–	3	–	1
Massachusetts State		–		5	–	4	–	0
La Salle		–		4	–	4	–	1
Penn		–		4	–	4	–	0
Penn State		–		4	–	4	–	0
Columbia		–		4	–	4	–	1
Vermont		–		4	–	5	–	0
Boston University		–		3	–	4	–	2
Harvard		–		3	–	5	–	0
Carnegie Tech		–		2	–	5	–	1
Buffalo		–		2	–	6	–	0
Tufts		–		1	–	5	–	2
Brown		–		1	–	8	–	0
Cornell		–		0	–	6	–	1
Rankings from United Press

The 1935 Vermont Catamounts football team was an American football team that represented the University of Vermont as an independent during the 1935 college football season. In their second year under head coach John P. Sabo, the team compiled a 4–5 record.

== Schedule ==
Date	Opponent	Site	Result	Attendance	Source
September 28	RPI	Centennial Field; Burlington, VT	W 18–0		
October 5	at Dartmouth	Memorial Field; Hanover, NH	L 0–47	5,000	
October 12	Colby	Centennial Field; Burlington, VT	L 0–6	3,000	
October 19	Union (NY)	Centennial Field; Burlington, VT	W 6–0	3,000	
October 26	at Boston University	Nickerson Field; Boston, MA	L 6–40	5,000	
November 2	at Norwich	Sabine Field; Northfield, VT	W 6–0	2,000	
November 9	Trinity (CT)	Centennial Field; Burlington, VT	L 0–7		
November 16	Middlebury	Centennial Field; Burlington, VT	W 9–0		
November 23	at Army	Michie Stadium; West Point, NY	L 0–34	5,000	
