= 1935 Penn Quakers football team =

American college football season

1935 Penn Quakers football
- Conference: Independent
- Record: 4–4
- Head coach: Harvey Harman (5th season)
- Captain: Paul Stofko
- Home stadium: Franklin Field

1935 Eastern college football independents records
	Conf.			Overall
Team	W	L	T	W		L		T
No. 3 Princeton		–		9	–	0	–	0
No. 14 Holy Cross		–		9	–	0	–	1
NYU		–		7	–	1	–	0
Dartmouth		–		8	–	2	–	0
Northeastern		–		5	–	0	–	3
Syracuse		–		6	–	1	–	1
No. 10 Pittsburgh		–		7	–	1	–	2
No. 11 Fordham		–		6	–	1	–	2
Villanova		–		7	–	2	–	0
Franklin & Marshall		–		7	–	2	–	1
Providence		–		6	–	2	–	0
No. 18 Army		–		6	–	2	–	1
Colgate		–		7	–	3	–	0
Temple		–		7	–	3	–	0
Boston College		–		6	–	3	–	0
Bucknell		–		6	–	3	–	0
Duquesne		–		6	–	3	–	0
Yale		–		6	–	3	–	0
CCNY		–		4	–	3	–	0
Manhattan		–		5	–	3	–	1
Massachusetts State		–		5	–	4	–	0
La Salle		–		4	–	4	–	1
Penn		–		4	–	4	–	0
Penn State		–		4	–	4	–	0
Columbia		–		4	–	4	–	1
Vermont		–		4	–	5	–	0
Boston University		–		3	–	4	–	2
Harvard		–		3	–	5	–	0
Carnegie Tech		–		2	–	5	–	1
Buffalo		–		2	–	6	–	0
Tufts		–		1	–	5	–	2
Brown		–		1	–	8	–	0
Cornell		–		0	–	6	–	1
Rankings from United Press

The 1935 Penn Quakers football team was an American football team that represented the University of Pennsylvania as an independent during the 1935 college football season. In its fifth season under head coach Harvey Harman, the team compiled a 4–4 record and outscored opponents by a total of 199 to 80. The team played its home games at Franklin Field in Philadelphia.

== Schedule ==
Date	Opponent	Site	Result	Attendance	Source
October 5	at Princeton	Palmer Stadium; Princeton, NJ (rivalry)	L 6–7	50,000	
October 12	Yale	Franklin Field; Philadelphia, PA	L 20–31		
October 19	Columbia	Franklin Field; Philadelphia, PA	W 34–0	45,000	
October 26	Lafayette	Franklin Field; Philadelphia, PA	W 67–0		
November 2	at Michigan	Michigan Stadium; Ann Arbor, MI	L 6–16	30,751	
November 9	Navy	Franklin Field; Philadelphia, PA	L 0–13		
November 16	Penn State	Franklin Field; Philadelphia, PA	W 33–6	40,000	
November 28	Cornell	Franklin Field; Philadelphia, PA (rivalry)	W 33–7		
