= 1935 Cornell Big Red football team =

American college football season

1935 Cornell Big Red football
- Conference: Independent
- Record: 0–6–1
- Head coach: Gil Dobie (16th season)
- Offensive scheme: Single-wing
- Base defense: 6–3–2
- Captain: H. S. Wilson
- Home stadium: Schoellkopf Field

1935 Eastern college football independents records
| | Conf. | | | Overall |
| Team | W | L | T | W | | L | | T |
|---|---|---|---|---|---|---|---|---|
| No. 3 Princeton | | – | | 9 | – | 0 | – | 0 |
| No. 14 Holy Cross | | – | | 9 | – | 0 | – | 1 |
| NYU | | – | | 7 | – | 1 | – | 0 |
| Dartmouth | | – | | 8 | – | 2 | – | 0 |
| Northeastern | | – | | 5 | – | 0 | – | 3 |
| Syracuse | | – | | 6 | – | 1 | – | 1 |
| No. 10 Pittsburgh | | – | | 7 | – | 1 | – | 2 |
| No. 11 Fordham | | – | | 6 | – | 1 | – | 2 |
| Villanova | | – | | 7 | – | 2 | – | 0 |
| Franklin & Marshall | | – | | 7 | – | 2 | – | 1 |
| Providence | | – | | 6 | – | 2 | – | 0 |
| No. 18 Army | | – | | 6 | – | 2 | – | 1 |
| Colgate | | – | | 7 | – | 3 | – | 0 |
| Temple | | – | | 7 | – | 3 | – | 0 |
| Boston College | | – | | 6 | – | 3 | – | 0 |
| Bucknell | | – | | 6 | – | 3 | – | 0 |
| Duquesne | | – | | 6 | – | 3 | – | 0 |
| Yale | | – | | 6 | – | 3 | – | 0 |
| CCNY | | – | | 4 | – | 3 | – | 0 |
| Manhattan | | – | | 5 | – | 3 | – | 1 |
| Massachusetts State | | – | | 5 | – | 4 | – | 0 |
| La Salle | | – | | 4 | – | 4 | – | 1 |
| Penn | | – | | 4 | – | 4 | – | 0 |
| Penn State | | – | | 4 | – | 4 | – | 0 |
| Columbia | | – | | 4 | – | 4 | – | 1 |
| Vermont | | – | | 4 | – | 5 | – | 0 |
| Boston University | | – | | 3 | – | 4 | – | 2 |
| Harvard | | – | | 3 | – | 5 | – | 0 |
| Carnegie Tech | | – | | 2 | – | 5 | – | 1 |
| Buffalo | | – | | 2 | – | 6 | – | 0 |
| Tufts | | – | | 1 | – | 5 | – | 2 |
| Brown | | – | | 1 | – | 8 | – | 0 |
| Cornell | | – | | 0 | – | 6 | – | 1 |
Rankings from United Press

The 1935 Cornell Big Red football team was an American football team that represented Cornell University during the 1935 college football season. In their 16th and final season under head coach Gil Dobie, the Big Red compiled a 0–6–1 record and were outscored by their opponents by a combined total of 201 to 59.

== Schedule ==
| Date | Opponent | Site | Result | Source |
|---|---|---|---|---|
| September 28 | St. Lawrence | Schoellkopf Field; Ithaca, NY | L 6–12 | |
| October 12 | at Syracuse | Archbold Stadium; Syracuse, NY | L 14–21 | |
| October 19 | Western Reserve | Schoellkopf Field; Ithaca, NY | L 19–33 | |
| October 26 | Princeton | Schoellkopf Field; Ithaca, NY | L 0–54 | |
| November 2 | Columbia | Schoellkopf Field; Ithaca, NY (rivalry) | T 7–7 | |
| November 16 | at Dartmouth | Memorial Field; Hanover, NH (rivalry) | L 6–41 | |
| November 28 | at Penn | Franklin Field; Philadelphia, PA (rivalry) | L 7–33 | |
