= 1935 Columbia Lions football team =

American college football season

1935 Columbia Lions football
- Conference: Independent
- Record: 4–4–1
- Head coach: Lou Little (6th season)
- Home stadium: Baker Field

1935 Eastern college football independents records
	Conf.			Overall
Team	W	L	T	W		L		T
No. 3 Princeton		–		9	–	0	–	0
No. 14 Holy Cross		–		9	–	0	–	1
NYU		–		7	–	1	–	0
Dartmouth		–		8	–	2	–	0
Northeastern		–		5	–	0	–	3
Syracuse		–		6	–	1	–	1
No. 10 Pittsburgh		–		7	–	1	–	2
No. 11 Fordham		–		6	–	1	–	2
Villanova		–		7	–	2	–	0
Franklin & Marshall		–		7	–	2	–	1
Providence		–		6	–	2	–	0
No. 18 Army		–		6	–	2	–	1
Colgate		–		7	–	3	–	0
Temple		–		7	–	3	–	0
Boston College		–		6	–	3	–	0
Bucknell		–		6	–	3	–	0
Duquesne		–		6	–	3	–	0
Yale		–		6	–	3	–	0
CCNY		–		4	–	3	–	0
Manhattan		–		5	–	3	–	1
Massachusetts State		–		5	–	4	–	0
La Salle		–		4	–	4	–	1
Penn		–		4	–	4	–	0
Penn State		–		4	–	4	–	0
Columbia		–		4	–	4	–	1
Vermont		–		4	–	5	–	0
Boston University		–		3	–	4	–	2
Harvard		–		3	–	5	–	0
Carnegie Tech		–		2	–	5	–	1
Buffalo		–		2	–	6	–	0
Tufts		–		1	–	5	–	2
Brown		–		1	–	8	–	0
Cornell		–		0	–	6	–	1
Rankings from United Press

The 1935 Columbia Lions football team was an American football team that represented Columbia University as an independent during the 1935 college football season. In its sixth season under head coach Lou Little, the team compiled a 4–4–1 record and was outscored by a total of 115 to 86. The team played its home games at Baker Field in Upper Manhattan.

== Schedule ==
Date	Opponent	Site	Result	Attendance	Source
October 5	VMI	Baker Field; New York, NY	W 12–0		
October 12	Rutgers	Baker Field; New York, NY	W 20–6		
October 19	at Penn	Franklin Field; Philadelphia, PA	L 0–34	45,000	
October 26	Michigan	Baker Field; New York, NY	L 7–19	24,901	
November 2	at Cornell	Schoellkopf Field; Ithaca, NY (rivalry)	T 7–7		
November 9	Syracuse	Baker Field; New York, NY	L 2–14	25,000	
November 16	at Navy	Annapolis, MD	L 7–28	15,000	
November 23	Brown	Baker Field; New York, NY	W 18–0		
November 30	Dartmouth	Baker Field; New York, NY	W 13–7	20,000	
