= 1935 Brown Bears football team =

American college football season

1935 Brown Bears football
- Conference: Independent
- Record: 1–8
- Head coach: Tuss McLaughry (10th season)
- Home stadium: Brown Stadium

1935 Eastern college football independents records
	Conf.			Overall
Team	W	L	T	W		L		T
No. 3 Princeton		–		9	–	0	–	0
No. 14 Holy Cross		–		9	–	0	–	1
NYU		–		7	–	1	–	0
Dartmouth		–		8	–	2	–	0
Northeastern		–		5	–	0	–	3
Syracuse		–		6	–	1	–	1
No. 10 Pittsburgh		–		7	–	1	–	2
No. 11 Fordham		–		6	–	1	–	2
Villanova		–		7	–	2	–	0
Franklin & Marshall		–		7	–	2	–	1
Providence		–		6	–	2	–	0
No. 18 Army		–		6	–	2	–	1
Colgate		–		7	–	3	–	0
Temple		–		7	–	3	–	0
Boston College		–		6	–	3	–	0
Bucknell		–		6	–	3	–	0
Duquesne		–		6	–	3	–	0
Yale		–		6	–	3	–	0
CCNY		–		4	–	3	–	0
Manhattan		–		5	–	3	–	1
Massachusetts State		–		5	–	4	–	0
La Salle		–		4	–	4	–	1
Penn		–		4	–	4	–	0
Penn State		–		4	–	4	–	0
Columbia		–		4	–	4	–	1
Vermont		–		4	–	5	–	0
Boston University		–		3	–	4	–	2
Harvard		–		3	–	5	–	0
Carnegie Tech		–		2	–	5	–	1
Buffalo		–		2	–	6	–	0
Tufts		–		1	–	5	–	2
Brown		–		1	–	8	–	0
Cornell		–		0	–	6	–	1
Rankings from United Press

The 1935 Brown Bears football team represented Brown University as an independent during the 1935 college football season. Led by tenth-year head coach Tuss McLaughry, the Bears compiled a record of 1–8.

== Schedule ==
Date	Opponent	Site	Result	Attendance	Source
October 5	Rhode Island State	Brown Stadium; Providence, RI (rivalry)	L 7–13	7,500	
October 12	Springfield	Brown Stadium; Providence, RI	L 0–20		
October 19	Dartmouth	Brown Stadium; Providence, RI	L 0–41		
October 26	at Syracuse	Archbold Stadium; Syracuse, NY	L 0–19		
November 2	at Harvard	Harvard Stadium; Boston, MA	L 0–33		
November 9	at Yale	Yale Bowl; New Haven, CT	L 0–20		
November 16	Boston University	Brown Stadium; Providence, RI	W 14–0	3,000	
November 23	at Columbia	Baker Field; New York, NY	L 0–18		
November 30	Colgate	Brown Stadium; Providence, RI	L 0–33		
