= 1935 Massachusetts State Aggies football team =

American college football season

1935 Massachusetts State Aggies football
- Conference: Independent
- Record: 5–4
- Head coach: Mel Taube (5th season)
- Home stadium: Alumni Field

1935 Eastern college football independents records
	Conf.			Overall
Team	W	L	T	W		L		T
No. 3 Princeton		–		9	–	0	–	0
No. 14 Holy Cross		–		9	–	0	–	1
NYU		–		7	–	1	–	0
Dartmouth		–		8	–	2	–	0
Northeastern		–		5	–	0	–	3
Syracuse		–		6	–	1	–	1
No. 10 Pittsburgh		–		7	–	1	–	2
No. 11 Fordham		–		6	–	1	–	2
Villanova		–		7	–	2	–	0
Franklin & Marshall		–		7	–	2	–	1
Providence		–		6	–	2	–	0
No. 18 Army		–		6	–	2	–	1
Colgate		–		7	–	3	–	0
Temple		–		7	–	3	–	0
Boston College		–		6	–	3	–	0
Bucknell		–		6	–	3	–	0
Duquesne		–		6	–	3	–	0
Yale		–		6	–	3	–	0
CCNY		–		4	–	3	–	0
Manhattan		–		5	–	3	–	1
Massachusetts State		–		5	–	4	–	0
La Salle		–		4	–	4	–	1
Penn		–		4	–	4	–	0
Penn State		–		4	–	4	–	0
Columbia		–		4	–	4	–	1
Vermont		–		4	–	5	–	0
Boston University		–		3	–	4	–	2
Harvard		–		3	–	5	–	0
Carnegie Tech		–		2	–	5	–	1
Buffalo		–		2	–	6	–	0
Tufts		–		1	–	5	–	2
Brown		–		1	–	8	–	0
Cornell		–		0	–	6	–	1
Rankings from United Press

The 1935 Massachusetts State Aggies football team represented Massachusetts State College in the 1935 college football season. The team was coached by Mel Taube and played its home games at Alumni Field in Amherst, Massachusetts. Massachusetts State finished the season with a record of 5–4.

== Schedule ==
Date	Opponent	Site	Result	Attendance	Source
September 28	at Williams	Weston Field; Williamstown, MA	L 0–28		
October 5	Bowdoin	Alumni Field; Amherst, MA	L 6–7		
October 12	Connecticut State	Alumni Field; Amherst, MA (rivalry)	W 25–12		
October 19	at Rhode Island State	Meade Stadium; Kingston, RI	W 7–6	2,000	
October 26	at Worcester Tech	Alumni Field; Worcester, MA	W 20–0		
November 2	at Amherst	Pratt Field; Amherst, MA	L 0–13		
November 9	at Northeastern	Kent Street Field; Brookline, MA	L 12–13		
November 16	at RPI	'86 Field; Troy, NY	W 28–13		
November 23	Tufts	Alumni Field; Amherst, MA	W 19–13		
