= 1935 Army Cadets football team =

American college football season

1935 Army Cadets football
- Conference: Independent
- Record: 6–2–1
- Head coach: Garrison H. Davidson (3rd season)
- Captain: William R. Shuler
- Home stadium: Michie Stadium

1935 Eastern college football independents records
	Conf.			Overall
Team	W	L	T	W		L		T
No. 3 Princeton		–		9	–	0	–	0
No. 14 Holy Cross		–		9	–	0	–	1
NYU		–		7	–	1	–	0
Dartmouth		–		8	–	2	–	0
Northeastern		–		5	–	0	–	3
Syracuse		–		6	–	1	–	1
No. 10 Pittsburgh		–		7	–	1	–	2
No. 11 Fordham		–		6	–	1	–	2
Villanova		–		7	–	2	–	0
Franklin & Marshall		–		7	–	2	–	1
Providence		–		6	–	2	–	0
No. 18 Army		–		6	–	2	–	1
Colgate		–		7	–	3	–	0
Temple		–		7	–	3	–	0
Boston College		–		6	–	3	–	0
Bucknell		–		6	–	3	–	0
Duquesne		–		6	–	3	–	0
Yale		–		6	–	3	–	0
CCNY		–		4	–	3	–	0
Manhattan		–		5	–	3	–	1
Massachusetts State		–		5	–	4	–	0
La Salle		–		4	–	4	–	1
Penn		–		4	–	4	–	0
Penn State		–		4	–	4	–	0
Columbia		–		4	–	4	–	1
Vermont		–		4	–	5	–	0
Boston University		–		3	–	4	–	2
Harvard		–		3	–	5	–	0
Carnegie Tech		–		2	–	5	–	1
Buffalo		–		2	–	6	–	0
Tufts		–		1	–	5	–	2
Brown		–		1	–	8	–	0
Cornell		–		0	–	6	–	1
Rankings from United Press

The 1935 Army Cadets football team represented the United States Military Academy as an independent during the 1935 college football season. In their third year under head coach Garrison H. Davidson, the Cadets compiled a 6–2–1 record, shut out four of their nine opponents, and outscored all opponents by a combined total of 176 to 62. In the annual Army–Navy Game, the Cadets defeated the Midshipmen 28–6. The Cadets' two losses came against Mississippi State and Pittsburgh, and they played Notre Dame to a 6–6 tie at Yankee Stadium.

Two Army players were recognized on the All-America team. End William R. Shuler received first-team honors from the Associated Press (AP). Halfback Charles R. Meyer received second-team honors from the United Press (UP) and North American Newspaper Alliance.

== Schedule ==
Date	Opponent	Site	Result	Attendance	Source
October 5	William & Mary	Michie Stadium; West Point, NY	W 14–0		
October 12	Gettysburg	Michie Stadium; West Point, NY	W 54–0		
October 19	Harvard	Michie Stadium; West Point, NY	W 13–0		
October 26	at Yale	Yale Bowl; New Haven, CT	W 14–8		
November 2	Mississippi State	Michie Stadium; West Point, NY	L 7–13		
November 9	at Pittsburgh	Pitt Stadium; Pittsburgh, PA	L 6–29	68,000	
November 16	vs. Notre Dame	Yankee Stadium; Bronx, NY (rivalry)	T 6–6	78,114–78,367	
November 23	Vermont	Michie Stadium; West Point, NY	W 34–0	5,000	
November 30	vs. Navy	Franklin Field; Philadelphia, PA (Army–Navy Game)	W 28–6		
