= 1935 Lafayette Leopards football team =

American football club

1935 Lafayette Leopards football
- Conference: Middle Three Conference
- Record: 2–7 (0–2 Middle Three)
- Head coach: Herb McCracken (12th season)
- Captain: W. R. Cocke Jr.
- Home stadium: Fisher Field

1935 Middle Three Conference football standings
	Conf.					Overall
Team	W		L		T	W		L		T
Rutgers $	2	–	0	–	0	4	–	5	–	0
Lehigh	1	–	1	–	0	5	–	4	–	0
Lafayette	0	–	2	–	0	2	–	7	–	0
$ – Conference champion

The 1935 Lafayette Leopards football team was an American football team that represented Lafayette College in the Middle Three Conference during the 1935 college football season. In its 12th season under head coach Herb McCracken, the team compiled a 2–7 record. W. R. Cocke Jr. was the team captain.

== Schedule ==
Date	Opponent	Site	Result	Source
September 28	Moravian*	Fisher Field; Easton, PA	W 19–0	
October 5	Muhlenberg*	Fisher Field; Easton, PA	W 7–0	
October 12	at Albright*	Reading, PA	L 0–38	
October 19	Colgate*	Fisher Stadium; Easton, PA	L 0–52	
October 26	at Penn*	Franklin Field; Philadelphia, PA	L 0–67	
November 2	Rutgers	Fisher Field; Easton, PA	L 6–31	
November 9	Baltimore*	Fisher Field; Easton, PA	W 26–0	
November 16	at Yale*	Yale Bowl; New Haven, CT	L 0–55	
November 23	at Lehigh	Taylor Stadium; Bethlethem, PA (rivalry)	L 0–48	
*Non-conference game
