= 1935 Bucknell Bison football team =

American college football season

1935 Bucknell Bison football
- Conference: Independent
- Record: 6–3
- Head coach: Edward Mylin (2nd season)
- Home stadium: Memorial Stadium

1935 Eastern college football independents records
	Conf.			Overall
Team	W	L	T	W		L		T
No. 3 Princeton		–		9	–	0	–	0
No. 14 Holy Cross		–		9	–	0	–	1
NYU		–		7	–	1	–	0
Dartmouth		–		8	–	2	–	0
Northeastern		–		5	–	0	–	3
Syracuse		–		6	–	1	–	1
No. 10 Pittsburgh		–		7	–	1	–	2
No. 11 Fordham		–		6	–	1	–	2
Villanova		–		7	–	2	–	0
Franklin & Marshall		–		7	–	2	–	1
Providence		–		6	–	2	–	0
No. 18 Army		–		6	–	2	–	1
Colgate		–		7	–	3	–	0
Temple		–		7	–	3	–	0
Boston College		–		6	–	3	–	0
Bucknell		–		6	–	3	–	0
Duquesne		–		6	–	3	–	0
Yale		–		6	–	3	–	0
CCNY		–		4	–	3	–	0
Manhattan		–		5	–	3	–	1
Massachusetts State		–		5	–	4	–	0
La Salle		–		4	–	4	–	1
Penn		–		4	–	4	–	0
Penn State		–		4	–	4	–	0
Columbia		–		4	–	4	–	1
Vermont		–		4	–	5	–	0
Boston University		–		3	–	4	–	2
Harvard		–		3	–	5	–	0
Carnegie Tech		–		2	–	5	–	1
Buffalo		–		2	–	6	–	0
Tufts		–		1	–	5	–	2
Brown		–		1	–	8	–	0
Cornell		–		0	–	6	–	1
Rankings from United Press

The 1935 Bucknell Bison football team was an American football team that represented Bucknell University as an independent during the 1935 college football season. In its second season under head coach Edward Mylin, the team compiled a 6–3 record.

The team played its home games at Memorial Stadium in Lewisburg, Pennsylvania.

== Schedule ==
Date	Opponent	Site	Result	Attendance	Source
September 27	Pennsylvania Military	Memorial Stadium; Lewisburg, PA	W 7–0	4,000	
October 4	Ursinus	Memorial Stadium; Lewisburg, PA	W 20–0		
October 12	at Villanova	Villanova Stadium; Villanova, PA	L 0–25	13,000	
October 19	at Western Maryland	Baltimore Stadium; Baltimore, MD	W 3–0	9,000	
October 26	Washington & Jefferson^{†}	Memorial Stadium; Lewisburg, PA	W 6–0	6,000	
November 2	at NYU	Yankee Stadium; Bronx, NY	L 0–14	12,000	
November 9	at Detroit	University of Detroit Stadium; Detroit, MI	L 0–53	12,000	
November 23	Penn State	Memorial Stadium; Lewisburg, PA	W 2–0	8,500	
November 28	at Temple	Temple Stadium; Philadelphia, PA	W 7–6	15,000	
^{†}Homecoming
