= 1935 Fordham Rams football team =

American college football season

1935 Fordham Rams football
- Conference: Independent
- Record: 6–1–2
- Head coach: Jim Crowley (3rd season)
- Captain: Joe Maniaci
- Home stadium: Polo Grounds, Yankee Stadium

1935 Eastern college football independents records
	Conf.			Overall
Team	W	L	T	W		L		T
No. 3 Princeton		–		9	–	0	–	0
No. 14 Holy Cross		–		9	–	0	–	1
NYU		–		7	–	1	–	0
Dartmouth		–		8	–	2	–	0
Northeastern		–		5	–	0	–	3
Syracuse		–		6	–	1	–	1
No. 10 Pittsburgh		–		7	–	1	–	2
No. 11 Fordham		–		6	–	1	–	2
Villanova		–		7	–	2	–	0
Franklin & Marshall		–		7	–	2	–	1
Providence		–		6	–	2	–	0
No. 18 Army		–		6	–	2	–	1
Colgate		–		7	–	3	–	0
Temple		–		7	–	3	–	0
Boston College		–		6	–	3	–	0
Bucknell		–		6	–	3	–	0
Duquesne		–		6	–	3	–	0
Yale		–		6	–	3	–	0
CCNY		–		4	–	3	–	0
Manhattan		–		5	–	3	–	1
Massachusetts State		–		5	–	4	–	0
La Salle		–		4	–	4	–	1
Penn		–		4	–	4	–	0
Penn State		–		4	–	4	–	0
Columbia		–		4	–	4	–	1
Vermont		–		4	–	5	–	0
Boston University		–		3	–	4	–	2
Harvard		–		3	–	5	–	0
Carnegie Tech		–		2	–	5	–	1
Buffalo		–		2	–	6	–	0
Tufts		–		1	–	5	–	2
Brown		–		1	–	8	–	0
Cornell		–		0	–	6	–	1
Rankings from United Press

The 1935 Fordham Rams football team was an American football team that represented Fordham University as an independent during the 1935 college football season. In its third year under head coach Jim Crowley, Fordham compiled a 6–1–2 record and outscored all opponents by a total of 134 to 41.

== Schedule ==
Date	Opponent	Site	Result	Attendance	Source
September 28	Franklin & Marshall	Polo Grounds; New York, NY	W 14–7		
October 5	Boston College	Polo Grounds; New York, NY	W 19–0	33,000	
October 12	Purdue	Polo Grounds; New York, NY	L 0–20	35,000	
October 19	Vanderbilt	Polo Grounds; New York, NY	W 13–7	25,000	
October 26	Lebanon Valley	Polo Grounds; New York, NY	W 15–0		
November 2	Pittsburgh	Polo Grounds; New York, NY	T 0–0	35,000	
November 9	Saint Mary's	Polo Grounds; New York, NY	T 7–7	55,000	
November 16	Muhlenberg	Polo Grounds; New York, NY	W 45–0		
November 28	vs. NYU	Yankee Stadium; Bronx, NY	W 21–0	72,000	
