= 1935 Yale Bulldogs football team =

American college football season

1935 Yale Bulldogs football
- Conference: Independent
- Record: 6–3
- Head coach: Ducky Pond (2nd season)
- Captain: Mather K. Whitehead
- Home stadium: Yale Bowl

1935 Eastern college football independents records
	Conf.			Overall
Team	W	L	T	W		L		T
No. 3 Princeton		–		9	–	0	–	0
No. 14 Holy Cross		–		9	–	0	–	1
NYU		–		7	–	1	–	0
Dartmouth		–		8	–	2	–	0
Northeastern		–		5	–	0	–	3
Syracuse		–		6	–	1	–	1
No. 10 Pittsburgh		–		7	–	1	–	2
No. 11 Fordham		–		6	–	1	–	2
Villanova		–		7	–	2	–	0
Franklin & Marshall		–		7	–	2	–	1
Providence		–		6	–	2	–	0
No. 18 Army		–		6	–	2	–	1
Colgate		–		7	–	3	–	0
Temple		–		7	–	3	–	0
Boston College		–		6	–	3	–	0
Bucknell		–		6	–	3	–	0
Duquesne		–		6	–	3	–	0
Yale		–		6	–	3	–	0
CCNY		–		4	–	3	–	0
Manhattan		–		5	–	3	–	1
Massachusetts State		–		5	–	4	–	0
La Salle		–		4	–	4	–	1
Penn		–		4	–	4	–	0
Penn State		–		4	–	4	–	0
Columbia		–		4	–	4	–	1
Vermont		–		4	–	5	–	0
Boston University		–		3	–	4	–	2
Harvard		–		3	–	5	–	0
Carnegie Tech		–		2	–	5	–	1
Buffalo		–		2	–	6	–	0
Tufts		–		1	–	5	–	2
Brown		–		1	–	8	–	0
Cornell		–		0	–	6	–	1
Rankings from United Press

The 1935 Yale Bulldogs football team represented Yale University in the 1935 college football season. The Bulldogs were led by second-year head coach Ducky Pond, played their home games at the Yale Bowl and finished the season with a 6–3 record.

== Schedule ==
Date	Opponent	Site	Result	Attendance	Source
October 5	New Hampshire	Yale Bowl; New Haven, CT	W 34–0	12,000	
October 12	at Penn	Franklin Field; Philadelphia, PA	W 31–20		
October 19	Navy	Yale Bowl; New Haven, CT	W 7–6		
October 26	Army	Yale Bowl; New Haven, CT	L 8–14		
November 2	Dartmouth	Yale Bowl; New Haven, CT	L 6–14	45,000	
November 9	Brown	Yale Bowl; New Haven, CT	W 20–0		
November 16	Lafayette	Yale Bowl; New Haven, CT	W 55–0		
November 23	at Harvard	Harvard Stadium; Boston, MA (rivalry)	W 14–7		
November 30	Princeton	Yale Bowl; New Haven, CT (rivalry)	L 7–38	55,000	

== NFL draft ==
The following Bulldog was selected in the National Football League draft following the season.

Round	Pick	Player	Position	NFL team
9	80	Bob (Choo-Choo) Train	E	Detroit Lions
