= 1935 Northeastern Huskies football team =

American college football season

1935 Northeastern Huskies football
- Conference: Independent
- Record: 5–0–3
- Head coach: Alfred McCoy (3rd season)
- Captain: Joe Chrusz
- Home stadium: Kent Street Field

1935 Eastern college football independents records
	Conf.			Overall
Team	W	L	T	W		L		T
No. 3 Princeton		–		9	–	0	–	0
No. 14 Holy Cross		–		9	–	0	–	1
NYU		–		7	–	1	–	0
Dartmouth		–		8	–	2	–	0
Northeastern		–		5	–	0	–	3
Syracuse		–		6	–	1	–	1
No. 10 Pittsburgh		–		7	–	1	–	2
No. 11 Fordham		–		6	–	1	–	2
Villanova		–		7	–	2	–	0
Franklin & Marshall		–		7	–	2	–	1
Providence		–		6	–	2	–	0
No. 18 Army		–		6	–	2	–	1
Colgate		–		7	–	3	–	0
Temple		–		7	–	3	–	0
Boston College		–		6	–	3	–	0
Bucknell		–		6	–	3	–	0
Duquesne		–		6	–	3	–	0
Yale		–		6	–	3	–	0
CCNY		–		4	–	3	–	0
Manhattan		–		5	–	3	–	1
Massachusetts State		–		5	–	4	–	0
La Salle		–		4	–	4	–	1
Penn		–		4	–	4	–	0
Penn State		–		4	–	4	–	0
Columbia		–		4	–	4	–	1
Vermont		–		4	–	5	–	0
Boston University		–		3	–	4	–	2
Harvard		–		3	–	5	–	0
Carnegie Tech		–		2	–	5	–	1
Buffalo		–		2	–	6	–	0
Tufts		–		1	–	5	–	2
Brown		–		1	–	8	–	0
Cornell		–		0	–	6	–	1
Rankings from United Press

The 1935 Northeastern Huskies football team represented Northeastern University during the 1935 college football season. It was the program's third season and they finished with an undefeated record of 5–0–3. Their head coach was Alfred McCoy and their captain was Joe Chrusz.

The game against Alfred on October 4 was the first college football night game in New England history.

== Schedule ==
Date	Time	Opponent	Site	Result	Attendance	Source
September 21		American International	Kent Street Field; Brookline, MA	W 26–0		
September 28		at Connecticut State	Gardner Dow Athletic Fields; Storrs, CT	T 0–0		
October 4	8:00 p.m.	Alfred	Kent Street Field; Brookline, MA	W 37–17	4,500	
October 12		Rhode Island	Kent Street Field; Brookline, MA	T 6–6		
October 19		at Norwich	Northfield, VT	W 33–0		
October 26		Lowell Textile	Kent Street Field; Brookline, MA	W 13–6		
November 2		at Tufts	Medford, MA	T 6–6		
November 9		Massachusetts State	Kent Street Field; Brookline, MA	W 13–12		
All times are in Eastern time
