= 1935 Maine Black Bears football team =

American college football season

1935 Maine Black Bears football

New England champion
- Conference: New England Conference, Maine Intercollegiate Athletic Association
- Record: 3–3–1 (2–0 New England, 0–2–1 MIAA)
- Head coach: Fred Brice (15th season)
- Captain: Albert Doherty
- Home stadium: Alumni Field

1935 New England Conference football standings
	Conf.					Overall
Team	W		L		T	W		L		T
Maine $	2	–	0	–	0	3	–	3	–	1
Rhode Island State	1	–	1	–	0	4	–	4	–	1
Connecticut State	0	–	1	–	0	2	–	4	–	1
New Hampshire	0	–	1	–	0	2	–	5	–	1
$ – Conference champion

The 1935 Maine Black Bears football team was an American football team that represented the University of Maine as a member of the New England Conference and Maine Intercollegiate Athletic Association during the 1935 college football season. In its 15th season under head coach Fred Brice, the team compiled a 3–3–1 record (2–0 against New England and 0–2–1 against MIAA conference opponents). The team played its home games at Alumni Field in Orono, Maine. Albert Doherty was the team captain.

== Schedule ==
Date	Opponent	Site	Result	Attendance	Source
September 28	Rhode Island State	Alumni Field; Orono, ME	W 7–0		
October 5	at Holy Cross*	Fitton Field; Worcester, MA	L 0–47		
October 12	New Hampshire	Alumni Field; Orono, ME (rivalry)	W 13–2		
October 19	Arnold*	Alumni Field; Orono, ME	W 26–0		
October 26	at Bates	Garcelon Field; Lewiston, ME	L 7–26	5,000	
November 2	at Colby	Seaverns Field; Waterville, ME	L 0–12		
November 9	Bowdoin	Alumni Field; Orono, ME	T 13–13		
*Non-conference game
