= 1935 New Hampshire Wildcats football team =

American college football season

1935 New Hampshire Wildcats football
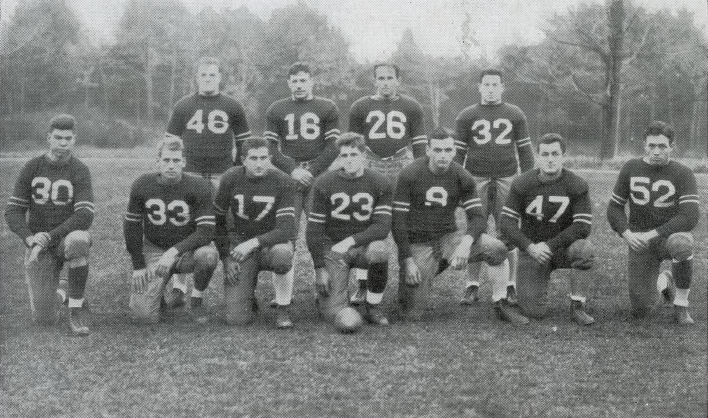
- Heins, Gouck, Verville, Nathanson; Rogean, Currier, Montrone, Bishop, Lekesky, Martin, Twyon
- Conference: New England Conference
- Record: 2–5–1 (0–1 New England)
- Head coach: Butch Cowell (20th season)
- Captain: Milton Johnson
- Home stadium: Memorial Field

1935 New England Conference football standings
	Conf.					Overall
Team	W		L		T	W		L		T
Maine $	2	–	0	–	0	3	–	3	–	1
Rhode Island State	1	–	1	–	0	4	–	4	–	1
Connecticut State	0	–	1	–	0	2	–	4	–	1
New Hampshire	0	–	1	–	0	2	–	5	–	1
$ – Conference champion

The 1935 New Hampshire Wildcats football team was an American football team that represented the University of New Hampshire as a member of the New England Conference during the 1935 college football season. In its 20th season under head coach William "Butch" Cowell, (Note: This was Cowell's 21st year and 20th season as head coach, as the school did not field a team in 1918 due to World War I.) the team compiled a 2–5–1 record, being outscored by their opponents 55–120. The team scored 47 of their points in two shutout wins, and only eight total points in their other six games. All five losses came in away games; the team had two wins and a tie at home. The team played its home games in Durham, New Hampshire, at Memorial Field. (Note: Memorial Field remains in use by the New Hampshire women's field hockey team.)

The November 9 win over Tufts was the last football game the Wildcats played at Memorial Field, as home games moved to Lewis Field (now named Wildcat Stadium) the following season, where the program has remained.

Head coach Cowell was in ill health at the start of the season, with Ernest Christensen, (Note: Christensen was head coach of the New Hampshire men's ice hockey team for 12 seasons.) one of his assistants, leading the team as they prepared for their first game. Cowell retired from coaching after the 1936 season; he died in August 1940 at the age of 53.

== Schedule ==
Date	Opponent	Site	Result	Attendance	Source
September 28	Lowell Textile* (Note: Lowell Textile is now University of Massachusetts Lowell.)	Memorial Field; Durham, NH	W 26–0		
October 5	at Yale*	Yale Bowl; New Haven, CT	L 0–34	12,000	
October 12	at Maine	Alumni Field; Orono, ME (rivalry)	L 2–13		
October 19	at Springfield)*	Pratt Field; Springfield, MA	L 0–13		
October 26	at Boston College*	Alumni Stadium; Chestnut Hill, MA	L 6–19		
November 2	Boston University*	Memorial Field; Durham, NH	T 0–0	5,000	
November 9	Tufts*^{†}	Memorial Field; Durham, NH	W 21–0	8,000	
November 16	at Harvard*	Harvard Stadium; Boston, MA	L 0–41	7,000	
*Non-conference game; ^{†}Homecoming; Source:

Two of Yale's touchdowns on October 5 were scored by Clint Frank, who went on to win the Heisman Trophy in 1937. The 1935 game remains the only time that the Yale and New Hampshire football programs have met. The November 2 game versus Boston University was the first Wildcat home football game broadcast on radio; it was carried on WHEB (AM) of Portsmouth, New Hampshire; the game was also attended by Styles Bridges, then Governor of New Hampshire.

Wildcat captain Milton Johnson later had a brief pre-season stint with the 1938 Washington Redskins, and may have played with the Boston Shamrocks that season.
