= 1935 NYU Violets football team =

American college football season

1935 NYU Violets football
- Conference: Independent
- Record: 7–1
- Head coach: Mal Stevens (2nd season)
- Home stadium: Ohio Field; Yankee Stadium

1935 Eastern college football independents records
	Conf.			Overall
Team	W	L	T	W		L		T
No. 3 Princeton		–		9	–	0	–	0
No. 14 Holy Cross		–		9	–	0	–	1
NYU		–		7	–	1	–	0
Dartmouth		–		8	–	2	–	0
Northeastern		–		5	–	0	–	3
Syracuse		–		6	–	1	–	1
No. 10 Pittsburgh		–		7	–	1	–	2
No. 11 Fordham		–		6	–	1	–	2
Villanova		–		7	–	2	–	0
Franklin & Marshall		–		7	–	2	–	1
Providence		–		6	–	2	–	0
No. 18 Army		–		6	–	2	–	1
Colgate		–		7	–	3	–	0
Temple		–		7	–	3	–	0
Boston College		–		6	–	3	–	0
Bucknell		–		6	–	3	–	0
Duquesne		–		6	–	3	–	0
Yale		–		6	–	3	–	0
CCNY		–		4	–	3	–	0
Manhattan		–		5	–	3	–	1
Massachusetts State		–		5	–	4	–	0
La Salle		–		4	–	4	–	1
Penn		–		4	–	4	–	0
Penn State		–		4	–	4	–	0
Columbia		–		4	–	4	–	1
Vermont		–		4	–	5	–	0
Boston University		–		3	–	4	–	2
Harvard		–		3	–	5	–	0
Carnegie Tech		–		2	–	5	–	1
Buffalo		–		2	–	6	–	0
Tufts		–		1	–	5	–	2
Brown		–		1	–	8	–	0
Cornell		–		0	–	6	–	1
Rankings from United Press

The 1935 NYU Violets football team was an American football team that represented New York University as an independent during the 1935 college football season. In their second year under head coach Mal Stevens, the team compiled a 7–1 record.

== Schedule ==
Date	Opponent	Site	Result	Attendance	Source
October 5	Bates	Yankee Stadium; Bronx, NY	W 34–7	8,000	
October 12	Carnegie Tech	Yankee Stadium; Bronx, NY	W 25–6	15,000	
October 19	Pennsylvania Military	Yankee Stadium; Bronx, NY	W 33–7	10,000	
October 26	Georgetown	Yankee Stadium; Bronx, NY	W 7–6	20,000	
November 2	Bucknell	Yankee Stadium; Bronx, NY	W 14–0	12,000	
November 9	CCNY	Yankee Stadium; Bronx, NY	W 45–0	6,000	
November 16	Rutgers	Ohio Field; Bronx, NY	W 48–0	15,000	
November 28	vs. Fordham	Yankee Stadium; Bronx, NY	L 0–21	72,000	
