= 1935 Connecticut State Huskies football team =

American college football season

1935 Connecticut State Huskies football
- Conference: New England Conference
- Record: 2–4–1 (0–1 New England)
- Head coach: J. Orlean Christian (2nd season)
- Home stadium: Gardner Dow Athletic Fields

1935 New England Conference football standings
	Conf.					Overall
Team	W		L		T	W		L		T
Maine $	2	–	0	–	0	3	–	3	–	1
Rhode Island State	1	–	1	–	0	4	–	4	–	1
Connecticut State	0	–	1	–	0	2	–	4	–	1
New Hampshire	0	–	1	–	0	2	–	5	–	1
$ – Conference champion

The 1935 Connecticut State Huskies football team represented Connecticut State College, now the University of Connecticut, in the 1935 college football season. The Huskies were led by second-year head coach J. Orlean Christian and completed the season with a record of 2–4–1.

== Schedule ==
Date	Opponent	Site	Result	Source
September 28	Northeastern*	Gardner Dow Athletic Fields; Storrs, CT	T 0–0	
October 5	at Wesleyan*	Andrus Field; Middletown, CT	L 0–7	
October 12	at Massachusetts State*	Alumni Field; Amherst, MA (rivalry)	L 12–25	
October 19	at Worcester Tech*	Worcester, MA	W 7–6	
October 26	Trinity (CT)*	Gardner Dow Athletic Fields; Storrs, CT	L 13–26	
November 2	Coast Guard*	Gardner Dow Athletic Fields; Storrs, CT	W 7–0	
November 9	at Rhode Island State	Meade Stadium; Kingston, RI (rivalry)	L 0–7	
*Non-conference game
