= 1935 Penn State Nittany Lions football team =

American college football season

1935 Penn State Nittany Lions football
- Conference: Independent
- Record: 4–4
- Head coach: Bob Higgins (6th season)
- Captain: Robert Weber
- Home stadium: New Beaver Field

1935 Eastern college football independents records
| | Conf. | | | Overall |
| Team | W | L | T | W | | L | | T |
|---|---|---|---|---|---|---|---|---|
| No. 3 Princeton | | – | | 9 | – | 0 | – | 0 |
| No. 14 Holy Cross | | – | | 9 | – | 0 | – | 1 |
| NYU | | – | | 7 | – | 1 | – | 0 |
| Dartmouth | | – | | 8 | – | 2 | – | 0 |
| Northeastern | | – | | 5 | – | 0 | – | 3 |
| Syracuse | | – | | 6 | – | 1 | – | 1 |
| No. 10 Pittsburgh | | – | | 7 | – | 1 | – | 2 |
| No. 11 Fordham | | – | | 6 | – | 1 | – | 2 |
| Villanova | | – | | 7 | – | 2 | – | 0 |
| Franklin & Marshall | | – | | 7 | – | 2 | – | 1 |
| Providence | | – | | 6 | – | 2 | – | 0 |
| No. 18 Army | | – | | 6 | – | 2 | – | 1 |
| Colgate | | – | | 7 | – | 3 | – | 0 |
| Temple | | – | | 7 | – | 3 | – | 0 |
| Boston College | | – | | 6 | – | 3 | – | 0 |
| Bucknell | | – | | 6 | – | 3 | – | 0 |
| Duquesne | | – | | 6 | – | 3 | – | 0 |
| Yale | | – | | 6 | – | 3 | – | 0 |
| CCNY | | – | | 4 | – | 3 | – | 0 |
| Manhattan | | – | | 5 | – | 3 | – | 1 |
| Massachusetts State | | – | | 5 | – | 4 | – | 0 |
| La Salle | | – | | 4 | – | 4 | – | 1 |
| Penn | | – | | 4 | – | 4 | – | 0 |
| Penn State | | – | | 4 | – | 4 | – | 0 |
| Columbia | | – | | 4 | – | 4 | – | 1 |
| Vermont | | – | | 4 | – | 5 | – | 0 |
| Boston University | | – | | 3 | – | 4 | – | 2 |
| Harvard | | – | | 3 | – | 5 | – | 0 |
| Carnegie Tech | | – | | 2 | – | 5 | – | 1 |
| Buffalo | | – | | 2 | – | 6 | – | 0 |
| Tufts | | – | | 1 | – | 5 | – | 2 |
| Brown | | – | | 1 | – | 8 | – | 0 |
| Cornell | | – | | 0 | – | 6 | – | 1 |
Rankings from United Press

The 1935 Penn State Nittany Lions football team represented the Pennsylvania State University as an independent during the 1935 college football season. The team was coached by Bob Higgins and played its home games in New Beaver Field in State College, Pennsylvania.

== Schedule ==
| Date | Opponent | Site | Result | Attendance | Source |
|---|---|---|---|---|---|
| October 5 | Lebanon Valley | New Beaver Field; State College, PA | W 12–6 | 5,848 | |
| October 12 | Western Maryland | New Beaver Field; State College, PA | W 2–0 | 7,140 | |
| October 19 | Lehigh^{†} | New Beaver Field; State College, PA | W 26–0 | 7,113 | |
| October 26 | at Pittsburgh | Pitt Stadium; Pittsburgh, PA (rivalry) | L 0–9 | 17,310 | |
| November 2 | at Syracuse | Archbold Stadium; Syracuse, NY (rivalry) | L 3–7 | 12,000 | |
| November 9 | Villanova | New Beaver Field; State College, PA | W 27–13 | 8,150 | |
| November 16 | at Penn | Franklin Field; Philadelphia, PA | L 6–33 | 40,000 | |
| November 23 | at Bucknell | Memorial Stadium; Lewisburg, PA | L 0–2 | 8,500 | |
^{†}Homecoming
