= 1935 Syracuse Orangemen football team =

American college football season

1935 Syracuse Orangemen football
- Conference: Independent
- Record: 6–1–1
- Head coach: Vic Hanson (6th season)
- Captains: Ed Jontos; George Perrault
- Home stadium: Archbold Stadium

1935 Eastern college football independents records
	Conf.			Overall
Team	W	L	T	W		L		T
No. 3 Princeton		–		9	–	0	–	0
No. 14 Holy Cross		–		9	–	0	–	1
NYU		–		7	–	1	–	0
Dartmouth		–		8	–	2	–	0
Northeastern		–		5	–	0	–	3
Syracuse		–		6	–	1	–	1
No. 10 Pittsburgh		–		7	–	1	–	2
No. 11 Fordham		–		6	–	1	–	2
Villanova		–		7	–	2	–	0
Franklin & Marshall		–		7	–	2	–	1
Providence		–		6	–	2	–	0
No. 18 Army		–		6	–	2	–	1
Colgate		–		7	–	3	–	0
Temple		–		7	–	3	–	0
Boston College		–		6	–	3	–	0
Bucknell		–		6	–	3	–	0
Duquesne		–		6	–	3	–	0
Yale		–		6	–	3	–	0
CCNY		–		4	–	3	–	0
Manhattan		–		5	–	3	–	1
Massachusetts State		–		5	–	4	–	0
La Salle		–		4	–	4	–	1
Penn		–		4	–	4	–	0
Penn State		–		4	–	4	–	0
Columbia		–		4	–	4	–	1
Vermont		–		4	–	5	–	0
Boston University		–		3	–	4	–	2
Harvard		–		3	–	5	–	0
Carnegie Tech		–		2	–	5	–	1
Buffalo		–		2	–	6	–	0
Tufts		–		1	–	5	–	2
Brown		–		1	–	8	–	0
Cornell		–		0	–	6	–	1
Rankings from United Press

The 1935 Syracuse Orangemen football team represented Syracuse University as an independent during the 1935 college football season. The Orangemen were led by sixth-year head coach Vic Hanson and played their home games at Archbold Stadium in Syracuse, New York.

== Schedule ==
Date	Opponent	Site	Result	Attendance	Source
October 5	Clarkson	Archbold Stadium; Syracuse, NY	W 33–0	10,000	
October 12	Cornell	Archbold Stadium; Syracuse, NY	W 21–14	10,000	
October 19	Ohio Wesleyan	Archbold Stadium; Syracuse, NY	W 18–10	15,000	
October 26	Brown	Archbold Stadium; Syracuse, NY	W 19–0	9,000	
November 2	Penn State	Archbold Stadium; Syracuse, NY (rivalry)	W 7–3	12,500	
November 9	at Columbia	Baker Field; New York, NY	W 14–2	25,000	
November 16	Colgate	Archbold Stadium; Syracuse, NY (rivalry)	L 0–27	32,000	
November 28	at Maryland	Municipal Stadium; Baltimore, MD	T 0–0	5,000	
