= John P. Sabo =

American football and basketball coach (1899–1957)

Biographical details
- Born: 1899
- Died: November 30, 1957 (aged 57–58); Detroit, Michigan, U.S.

Playing career

Football
- 1918: Illinois
- 1920: Illinois
- Position: End

Coaching career (HC unless noted)

Football
- 1922: Rochester (assistant)
- 1923–1924: East Aurora HS (IL)
- 1925–1927: Kansas (ends)
- 1928–1932: Illinois (assistant)
- 1933: Northwestern (assistant)
- 1934–1939: Vermont
- 1941: Yale (assistant)

Basketball
- 1922–1923: Rochester
- 1923–1925: East Aurora HS (IL)
- 1929–1933: Illinois (freshmen)
- 1934–1940: Vermont

Head coaching record
- Overall: 16–28–5 (football); 55–48 (basketball)

John Philip Sabo (1899 – November 30, 1957) was an American college football and college basketball coach who was the head men's basketball coach at the University of Rochester (1922–1923) and the University of Vermont (1934–1940) and the head football coach at Vermont from 1934 to 1939.

== Early life ==
Sabo played football at the University of Illinois in 1918 and 1920. While at Illinois he was the president of the Sigma Pi fraternity chapter and received his degree in 1922.

== Coaching ==
Sabo began his coaching career as an assistant football coach at the University of Rochester in 1922. He also served as the school's head basketball coach from 1922 to 1923. In 1923, he was named the coach of all major sports at East Aurora High School in Aurora, Illinois.

In 1925, Sabo became an assistant football and freshmen baseball coach at the University of Kansas. He left the school following the 1927 Kansas Jayhawks football season when the entire coaching staff resigned en masse. In 1928, he returned to his alma mater to serve as an assistant football coach. The following year, he was named freshmen basketball coach. He was an assistant football coach at Northwestern University during the 1933 season.

In 1934, Sabo became the head basketball coach at the University of Vermont in Burlington, Vermont, a position he held for six seasons. He also served as Vermont's head football coach from 1934 to 1939. His contract was not renewed in 1940 and he was replaced by one of his assistants – John C. Evans.

In 1941, Sabo was an assistant football coach at Yale University. Head coach Spike Nelson left after the season and all of his assistants, including Sabo, were let go.

== World War II ==
When the United States entered World War II, Sabo completed a training course at United States Naval Academy and was commissioned as a Lieutenant Commander in the United States Navy in 1942. He was assigned to oversee the mass exercise group at the Navy's training centers at the University of North Carolina at Chapel Hill. In 1944, he was assigned to the Allied advanced base in New Guinea, where he assisted George Halas with recreation and morale. By 1945, he had been promoted to Commander and was stationed in the Philippines.

== Later life ==
In 1945, Sabo was named director of field activities for the Illinois Alumni Association. He resigned in 1947 to take a position with Owens-Illinois. He later managed three glass plants in Defiance, Ohio for Libbey-Owens-Ford. He died on November 30, 1957, in Detroit.

== Head coaching record ==
=== Football ===
Year	Team	Overall	Conference	Standing	Bowl/playoffs
Vermont Catamounts (Independent) (1934–1939)
1934	Vermont	2–4–2			
1935	Vermont	4–5			
1936	Vermont	1–8			
1937	Vermont	2–6			
1938	Vermont	4–2–1			
1939	Vermont	3–3–2			
Vermont:		16–28–5			
Total:		16–28–5			

=== Basketball ===
Record table
Season	Team	Overall	Conference	Standing	Postseason
Rochester (N/A) (1922–1923)
1922–23	Rochester	5–14	N/A		
Rochester:		5–14 (.263)			
Vermont (N/A) (1934–1940)
1934–35	Vermont	8–5	N/A		
1935–36	Vermont	7–6	N/A		
1936–37	Vermont	10–4	N/A		
1937–38	Vermont	10–4	N/A		
1938–39	Vermont	10–5	N/A		
1939–40	Vermont	5–10	N/A		
Vermont:		50–34 (.595)			
Total:		55–48 (.534)			
