= 1935 Villanova Wildcats football team =

American college football season

1935 Villanova Wildcats football
- Conference: Independent
- Record: 7–2
- Head coach: Harry Stuhldreher (11th season)
- Captain: Edward Michaels
- Home stadium: Villanova Stadium

1935 Eastern college football independents records
	Conf.			Overall
Team	W	L	T	W		L		T
No. 3 Princeton		–		9	–	0	–	0
No. 14 Holy Cross		–		9	–	0	–	1
NYU		–		7	–	1	–	0
Dartmouth		–		8	–	2	–	0
Northeastern		–		5	–	0	–	3
Syracuse		–		6	–	1	–	1
No. 10 Pittsburgh		–		7	–	1	–	2
No. 11 Fordham		–		6	–	1	–	2
Villanova		–		7	–	2	–	0
Franklin & Marshall		–		7	–	2	–	1
Providence		–		6	–	2	–	0
No. 18 Army		–		6	–	2	–	1
Colgate		–		7	–	3	–	0
Temple		–		7	–	3	–	0
Boston College		–		6	–	3	–	0
Bucknell		–		6	–	3	–	0
Duquesne		–		6	–	3	–	0
Yale		–		6	–	3	–	0
CCNY		–		4	–	3	–	0
Manhattan		–		5	–	3	–	1
Massachusetts State		–		5	–	4	–	0
La Salle		–		4	–	4	–	1
Penn		–		4	–	4	–	0
Penn State		–		4	–	4	–	0
Columbia		–		4	–	4	–	1
Vermont		–		4	–	5	–	0
Boston University		–		3	–	4	–	2
Harvard		–		3	–	5	–	0
Carnegie Tech		–		2	–	5	–	1
Buffalo		–		2	–	6	–	0
Tufts		–		1	–	5	–	2
Brown		–		1	–	8	–	0
Cornell		–		0	–	6	–	1
Rankings from United Press

The 1935 Villanova Wildcats football team represented the Villanova University during the 1935 college football season. The head coach was Harry Stuhldreher, coaching his eleventh season with the Wildcats. The team played their home games at Villanova Stadium in Villanova, Pennsylvania.

== Schedule ==
Date	Opponent	Site	Result	Attendance	Source
September 21	Pennsylvania Military	Villanova Stadium; Villanova, PA	W 41–0		
September 28	Ursinus	Villanova Stadium; Villanova, PA	W 31–0		
October 5	Western Maryland	Villanova Stadium; Villanova, PA	W 20–0		
October 12	Bucknell	Villanova Stadium; Villanova, PA	W 25–0	13,000	
October 19	La Salle	Villanova Stadium; Villanova, PA	W 20–0	10,000	
October 26	at Detroit	University of Detroit Stadium; Detroit, MI	L 15–19	15,000	
November 2	Detroit	Villanova Stadium; Villanova, PA	W 13–7	10,000	
November 9	at Penn State	New Beaver Field; State College, PA	L 13–27	8,150	
November 21	at Temple	Temple Stadium; Philadelphia, PA	W 21–14		
