= 1935 Boston College Eagles football team =

American college football season

1935 Boston College Eagles football
- Conference: Independent
- Record: 6–3
- Head coach: Dinny McNamara (1st season; first 4 games); Harry Downes (last 5 games)
- Captain: Joe O'Brien
- Home stadium: Alumni Field

1935 Eastern college football independents records
	Conf.			Overall
Team	W	L	T	W		L		T
No. 3 Princeton		–		9	–	0	–	0
No. 14 Holy Cross		–		9	–	0	–	1
NYU		–		7	–	1	–	0
Dartmouth		–		8	–	2	–	0
Northeastern		–		5	–	0	–	3
Syracuse		–		6	–	1	–	1
No. 10 Pittsburgh		–		7	–	1	–	2
No. 11 Fordham		–		6	–	1	–	2
Villanova		–		7	–	2	–	0
Franklin & Marshall		–		7	–	2	–	1
Providence		–		6	–	2	–	0
No. 18 Army		–		6	–	2	–	1
Colgate		–		7	–	3	–	0
Temple		–		7	–	3	–	0
Boston College		–		6	–	3	–	0
Bucknell		–		6	–	3	–	0
Duquesne		–		6	–	3	–	0
Yale		–		6	–	3	–	0
CCNY		–		4	–	3	–	0
Manhattan		–		5	–	3	–	1
Massachusetts State		–		5	–	4	–	0
La Salle		–		4	–	4	–	1
Penn		–		4	–	4	–	0
Penn State		–		4	–	4	–	0
Columbia		–		4	–	4	–	1
Vermont		–		4	–	5	–	0
Boston University		–		3	–	4	–	2
Harvard		–		3	–	5	–	0
Carnegie Tech		–		2	–	5	–	1
Buffalo		–		2	–	6	–	0
Tufts		–		1	–	5	–	2
Brown		–		1	–	8	–	0
Cornell		–		0	–	6	–	1
Rankings from United Press

The 1935 Boston College Eagles football team represented Boston College as an independent during the 1935 college football season. The Eagles began the year led by head coach Dinny McNamara, but he resigned after four games due to illness. Former All-American Harry Downes coached the final five games. Boston College played their home games at Alumni Field in Chestnut Hill, Massachusetts. The team finished with a record of 9–3.

== Schedule ==
Date	Opponent	Site	Result	Attendance	Source
September 28	Saint Anselm	Alumni Field; Chestnut Hill, MA	W 13–2		
October 5	at Fordham	Polo Grounds; New York, NY	L 0–19	33,000	
October 19	Michigan State	Alumni Field; Chestnut Hill, MA	W 18–6		
October 26	New Hampshire	Alumni Field; Chestnut Hill, MA	W 19–6		
November 2	Providence	Alumni Field; Chestnut Hill, MA	W 20–6		
November 9	Western Maryland	Alumni Field; Chestnut Hill, MA	L 6–12		
November 16	Springfield	Alumni Field; Chestnut Hill, MA	W 39–0		
November 23	Boston University	Alumni Field; Chestnut Hill, MA (rivalry)	W 25–6		
November 30	Holy Cross	Alumni Field; Chestnut Hill, MA (rivalry)	L 6–20		
