= 1935 Duquesne Dukes football team =

American college football season

1935 Duquesne Dukes football
- Conference: Independent
- Record: 6–3
- Head coach: Christie Flanagan (1st season)
- Home stadium: Forbes Field

1935 Eastern college football independents records
	Conf.			Overall
Team	W	L	T	W		L		T
No. 3 Princeton		–		9	–	0	–	0
No. 14 Holy Cross		–		9	–	0	–	1
NYU		–		7	–	1	–	0
Dartmouth		–		8	–	2	–	0
Northeastern		–		5	–	0	–	3
Syracuse		–		6	–	1	–	1
No. 10 Pittsburgh		–		7	–	1	–	2
No. 11 Fordham		–		6	–	1	–	2
Villanova		–		7	–	2	–	0
Franklin & Marshall		–		7	–	2	–	1
Providence		–		6	–	2	–	0
No. 18 Army		–		6	–	2	–	1
Colgate		–		7	–	3	–	0
Temple		–		7	–	3	–	0
Boston College		–		6	–	3	–	0
Bucknell		–		6	–	3	–	0
Duquesne		–		6	–	3	–	0
Yale		–		6	–	3	–	0
CCNY		–		4	–	3	–	0
Manhattan		–		5	–	3	–	1
Massachusetts State		–		5	–	4	–	0
La Salle		–		4	–	4	–	1
Penn		–		4	–	4	–	0
Penn State		–		4	–	4	–	0
Columbia		–		4	–	4	–	1
Vermont		–		4	–	5	–	0
Boston University		–		3	–	4	–	2
Harvard		–		3	–	5	–	0
Carnegie Tech		–		2	–	5	–	1
Buffalo		–		2	–	6	–	0
Tufts		–		1	–	5	–	2
Brown		–		1	–	8	–	0
Cornell		–		0	–	6	–	1
Rankings from United Press

The 1935 Duquesne Dukes football team was an American football team that represented Duquesne University as an independent during the 1935 college football season. In its first and only season under head coach Christie Flanagan, Duquesne compiled a 6–3 record and outscored opponents by a total of 99 to 63. The team played its home games at Forbes Field in Pittsburgh.

== Schedule ==
Date	Time	Opponent	Site	Result	Attendance	Source
September 20		Illinois Wesleyan	Forbes Field; Pittsburgh, PA	W 20–6		
September 27		Kansas State	Forbes Field; Pittsburgh, PA	L 0–12		
October 5		at Rice	Rice Field; Houston, TX	L 7–27	11,000	
October 11	8:15 p.m.	Catholic University	Forbes Field; Pittsburgh, PA	L 0–6	5,000	
October 18	8:15 p.m.	Washington University	Forbes Field; Pittsburgh, PA	W 13–6		
November 2		Carnegie Tech	Pittsburgh, PA	W 7–0		
November 9		at Oklahoma A&M	Lewis Field; Stillwater, OK	W 20–0		
November 16		at West Virginia	Mountaineer Field; Morgantown, WV	W 19–0	8,000	
November 23		Detroit	Forbes Field; Pittsburgh, PA	W 13–6	7,100	
All times are in Eastern time
