= 1935 Rutgers Queensmen football team =

American college football season

1935 Rutgers Queensmen football

Middle Three champion
- Conference: Middle Three Conference
- Record: 4–5 (2–0 Middle Three)
- Head coach: J. Wilder Tasker (5th season)
- Captain: Maurice L. Bullard
- Home stadium: Neilson Field

1935 Middle Three Conference football standings
	Conf.					Overall
Team	W		L		T	W		L		T
Rutgers $	2	–	0	–	0	4	–	5	–	0
Lehigh	1	–	1	–	0	5	–	4	–	0
Lafayette	0	–	2	–	0	2	–	7	–	0
$ – Conference champion

The 1935 Rutgers Queensmen football team represented Rutgers University in the 1935 college football season. In their fifth season under head coach J. Wilder Tasker, the Queensmen compiled a 4–5 record, won the Middle Three Conference championship, and were outscored by their opponents 170 to 115.

== Schedule ==
Date	Opponent	Site	Result	Attendance	Source
September 28	West Chester	Neilson Field; New Brunswick, NJ	L 7–19	7,000	
October 5	Marietta	Neilson Field; New Brunswick, NJ	W 26–9	3,500	
October 12	at Columbia	Baker Field; New York, NY	L 6–20		
October 19	at Princeton	Palmer Stadium; Princeton, NJ (rivalry)	L 6–29	25,000	
October 26	Lehigh	Neilson Field; New Brunswick, NJ	W 27–6	8,500	
November 2	at Lafayette	Fisher Field; Easton, PA	W 31–6		
November 9	at Boston University	Fenway Park; Boston, MA	W 12–6	5,000	
November 16	at NYU	Ohio Field; Bronx, NY	L 0–48	15,000	
November 23	Colgate	Neilson Field; New Brunswick, NJ	L 0–27	10,000	
