= 1935 Lehigh Engineers football team =

American college football season

1935 Lehigh Engineers football
- Conference: Middle Three Conference
- Record: 5–4 (1–1 Middle Three)
- Head coach: Glen Harmeson (2nd season)
- Captain: Howell Scobey Jr.
- Home stadium: Taylor Stadium

1935 Middle Three Conference football standings
	Conf.					Overall
Team	W		L		T	W		L		T
Rutgers $	2	–	0	–	0	4	–	5	–	0
Lehigh	1	–	1	–	0	5	–	4	–	0
Lafayette	0	–	2	–	0	2	–	7	–	0
$ – Conference champion

The 1935 Lehigh Engineers football team was an American football team that represented Lehigh University during the 1935 college football season. In its second season under head coach Glen Harmeson, the team improved to a 5–4 record, though it again split the two games against its Middle Three Conference rivals. Lehigh played home games at Taylor Stadium in Bethlehem, Pennsylvania.

== Schedule ==
Date	Opponent	Site	Result	Attendance	Source
September 28	Upsala*	Taylor Stadium; Bethlehem, PA	W 16–7	5,000	
October 5	at Haverford*	Walton Field; Haverford, PA	W 21–0		
October 12	Dickinson*	Taylor Stadium; Bethlehem, PA	W 26–0	5,000	
October 19	at Penn State*	New Beaver Field; State College, PA	L 0–26	10,000	
October 26	at Rutgers	Neilson Field; New Brunswick, NJ	L 6–27	8,500	
November 2	Gettysburg*	Taylor Stadium; Bethlehem, PA	L 14–21		
November 9	Muhlenberg*	Taylor Stadium; Bethlehem, PA	W 26–6	8,000	
November 16	at Princeton*	Palmer Stadium; Princeton, NJ	L 0–27	15,000	
November 23	Lafayette	Taylor Stadium; Bethlehem, PA (rivalry)	W 48–0	12,000	
*Non-conference game
