= Christie Flanagan =

American football player (1905–1991)

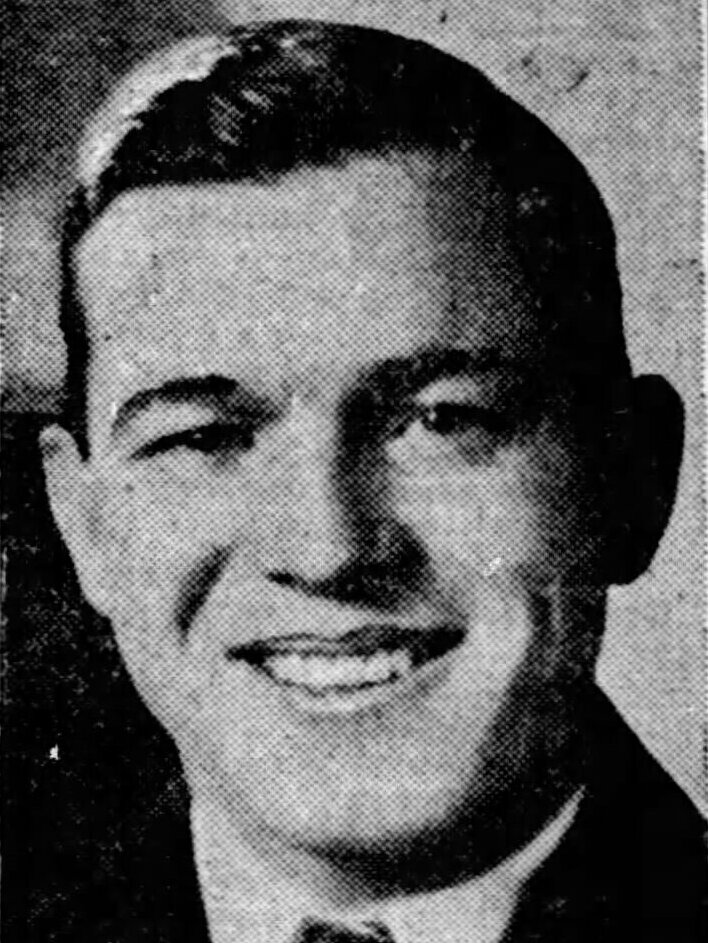
- Flanagan circa 1927

Notre Dame Fighting Irish
- Position: Halfback

Personal information
- Born: December 8, 1905; Beaumont, Texas, U.S.
- Died: March 22, 1991 (aged 85); Port Arthur, Texas, U.S.
- Listed height: 6 ft 0 in (1.83 m)
- Listed weight: 170 lb (77 kg)

Career information
- College: Notre Dame (1925–1928)

Awards and highlights
- First-team All-American (1927); Second-team All-American (1926)

Christopher S. "Christie" Flanagan Jr. (December 8, 1905 – March 22, 1991), also known as Christy Flanagan in certain Notre Dame materials, was an All-American college football player for Knute Rockne's Notre Dame Fighting Irish. He scored the touchdown to beat Army in 1926. He ran for over 1,800 yards and 15 touchdowns in his career.

== Head coaching record ==
Year	Team	Overall	Conference	Standing	Bowl/playoffs
Duquesne Dukes (Independent) (1935)
1935	Duquesne	6–3			
Duquesne:		6–3			
Total:		6–3			
