= Dinny McNamara =

American football and baseball player and coach (1905–1963)

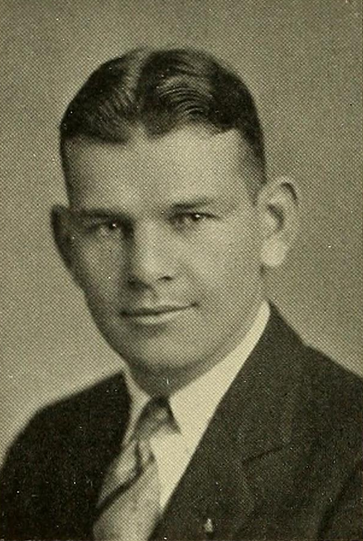
- McNamara pictured in Sub Turri 1927, Boston College yearbook

Biographical details
- Born: September 16, 1905; Lexington, Massachusetts, U.S.
- Died: December 20, 1963 (aged 58); Arlington, Massachusetts, U.S.

Playing career

Football
- 1923–1926: Boston College

Baseball
- c. 1925: Boston College
- 1927–1928: Providence Grays
- 1927–1928: Boston Braves
- Positions: Quarterback (football); Outfielder (baseball)

Coaching career (HC unless noted)

Football
- 1927–1932: Fordham (backfield)
- 1933–1934: Boston College (backfield)
- 1935: Boston College

Head coaching record
- Overall: 3–1

Dinny McNamara
- Outfielder
- Born: September 16, 1905; Lexington, Massachusetts
- Died: December 20, 1963 (aged 58); Arlington, Massachusetts
- Batted: Left Threw: Right

MLB debut
- July 2, 1927, for the Boston Braves

Last MLB appearance
- May 30, 1928, for the Boston Braves

MLB statistics
- Batting average: .077
- Hits: 1
- Runs scored: 5
- Stats at Baseball Reference

Teams
- Boston Braves (1927–1928)

John Raymond "Dinny" McNamara (September 16, 1905 – December 20, 1963) was an American football and baseball player and coach. He served as the head football coach at Boston College for the first four games of the 1935 season, compiling a record of 3–1. He briefly played Major League Baseball with the Boston Braves in 1927 and 1928.

== Baseball career ==
After graduating from Boston College in June 1927, McNamara signed as a free agent with the Boston Braves. He made his major league debut on July 2, 1927. In two seasons with the Braves, he played in 20 games, mostly as a pinch runner, had one hit in 13 at-bats for a batting average of .077, and scored five runs. He also spent time with the Providence Grays of the New England League. In 1929, he played for Osterville of the Cape Cod Baseball League.

== Coaching career ==
McNamara was the backfield coach at Fordham University under Frank Cavanaugh from 1927 to 1932. In 1933, he served as an assistant to Joe McKenney at Boston College. McNamara became head football coach at Boston College in 1935 after McKenney resigned to accept the post of associate director of physical education in the Boston public school system. Midway through the 1935 season, McNamara resigned due to a "nervous ailment" and was replaced by Harry Downes. His record at head coach was 3–1. McNamara also served as the freshman baseball coach at Boston College. He was killed on December 20, 1963, when he was hit by a car while walking near his home.

== Head coaching record ==
Year	Team	Overall	Conference	Standing	Bowl/playoffs
Boston College Eagles (Independent) (1935)
1935	Boston College	3–1 (Note: Harry Downes coached the last five games of the season after McNamara resigned.)			
Boston College:		3–1			
Total:		3–1			
