= 1935 Temple Owls football team =

American college football season

1935 Temple Owls football
- Conference: Independent
- Record: 7–3
- Head coach: Pop Warner (3rd season)
- Captain: James Russell
- Home stadium: Temple Stadium

1935 Eastern college football independents records
	Conf.			Overall
Team	W	L	T	W		L		T
No. 3 Princeton		–		9	–	0	–	0
No. 14 Holy Cross		–		9	–	0	–	1
NYU		–		7	–	1	–	0
Dartmouth		–		8	–	2	–	0
Northeastern		–		5	–	0	–	3
Syracuse		–		6	–	1	–	1
No. 10 Pittsburgh		–		7	–	1	–	2
No. 11 Fordham		–		6	–	1	–	2
Villanova		–		7	–	2	–	0
Franklin & Marshall		–		7	–	2	–	1
Providence		–		6	–	2	–	0
No. 18 Army		–		6	–	2	–	1
Colgate		–		7	–	3	–	0
Temple		–		7	–	3	–	0
Boston College		–		6	–	3	–	0
Bucknell		–		6	–	3	–	0
Duquesne		–		6	–	3	–	0
Yale		–		6	–	3	–	0
CCNY		–		4	–	3	–	0
Manhattan		–		5	–	3	–	1
Massachusetts State		–		5	–	4	–	0
La Salle		–		4	–	4	–	1
Penn		–		4	–	4	–	0
Penn State		–		4	–	4	–	0
Columbia		–		4	–	4	–	1
Vermont		–		4	–	5	–	0
Boston University		–		3	–	4	–	2
Harvard		–		3	–	5	–	0
Carnegie Tech		–		2	–	5	–	1
Buffalo		–		2	–	6	–	0
Tufts		–		1	–	5	–	2
Brown		–		1	–	8	–	0
Cornell		–		0	–	6	–	1
Rankings from United Press

The 1935 Temple Owls football team was an American football team that represented Temple University as an independent during the 1935 college football season. In its third season under head coach Pop Warner, the team compiled a 7–3 record and outscored opponents by a total of 181 to 68. After winning their first six games, the Owls then lost three of their last four games. The team played its home games at Temple Stadium in Philadelphia.

== Schedule ==
Date	Time	Opponent	Site	Result	Attendance	Source
September 20	Night	Saint Joseph's	Temple Stadium; Philadelphia, PA	W 51–0	23,000	
September 27	8:30 p.m.	Centre	Temple Stadium; Philadelphia, PA	W 25–13	15,000	
October 5		vs. Texas A&M	Lion Stadium; Tyler, TX	W 14–0	14,000	
October 11	8:30 p.m.	Vanderbilt	Temple Stadium; Philadelphia, PA	W 6–3	22,000	
October 19		at Carnegie Tech	Pittsburgh, PA	W 13–0		
October 26		at West Virginia	Mountaineer Field; Morgantown, WV	W 19–6	12,000	
November 2		Michigan State	Temple Stadium; Philadelphia, PA	L 7–12	25,000	
November 16		Marquette	Temple Stadium; Philadelphia, PA	W 26–6	18,000	
November 23		Villanova	Temple Stadium; Philadelphia, PA	L 14–21		
November 28		Bucknell	Temple Stadium; Philadelphia, PA	L 6–7	15,000	
All times are in Eastern time
