= 1935 Colgate Red Raiders football team =

American college football season

1935 Colgate Red Raiders football
- Conference: Independent
- Record: 7–3
- Head coach: Andrew Kerr (7th season)
- Captain: Charles Wasicek
- Home stadium: Whitnall Field

1935 Eastern college football independents records
	Conf.			Overall
Team	W	L	T	W		L		T
No. 3 Princeton		–		9	–	0	–	0
No. 14 Holy Cross		–		9	–	0	–	1
NYU		–		7	–	1	–	0
Dartmouth		–		8	–	2	–	0
Northeastern		–		5	–	0	–	3
Syracuse		–		6	–	1	–	1
No. 10 Pittsburgh		–		7	–	1	–	2
No. 11 Fordham		–		6	–	1	–	2
Villanova		–		7	–	2	–	0
Franklin & Marshall		–		7	–	2	–	1
Providence		–		6	–	2	–	0
No. 18 Army		–		6	–	2	–	1
Colgate		–		7	–	3	–	0
Temple		–		7	–	3	–	0
Boston College		–		6	–	3	–	0
Bucknell		–		6	–	3	–	0
Duquesne		–		6	–	3	–	0
Yale		–		6	–	3	–	0
CCNY		–		4	–	3	–	0
Manhattan		–		5	–	3	–	1
Massachusetts State		–		5	–	4	–	0
La Salle		–		4	–	4	–	1
Penn		–		4	–	4	–	0
Penn State		–		4	–	4	–	0
Columbia		–		4	–	4	–	1
Vermont		–		4	–	5	–	0
Boston University		–		3	–	4	–	2
Harvard		–		3	–	5	–	0
Carnegie Tech		–		2	–	5	–	1
Buffalo		–		2	–	6	–	0
Tufts		–		1	–	5	–	2
Brown		–		1	–	8	–	0
Cornell		–		0	–	6	–	1
Rankings from United Press

The 1935 Colgate Red Raiders football team was an American football team that represented Colgate University as an independent during the 1935 college football season. In its fifth season under head coach Andrew Kerr, the team compiled a 7–3 record, shut out seven of ten opponents, and outscored all opponents by a total of 224 to 29. Charles Wasicek was the team captain.

On October 5, 1935, Colgate played a unique "triangular" match against St. Lawrence and Amherst. Each team played 30 minutes against the other two teams. Colgate won both of its games.

The team played its home games on Whitnall Field in Hamilton, New York.

== Schedule ==
Date	Opponent	Site	Result	Attendance	Source
September 28	Niagara	Whitnall Field; Hamilton, NY	W 30–0	3,000	
October 5	St. Lawrence	Whitnall Field; Hamilton, NY	W 31–0	6,000	
October 5	Amherst	Whitnall Field; Hamilton, NY	W 12–0	6,000	
October 12	at Iowa	Iowa Stadium; Iowa City, IA	L 6–12		
October 19	at Lafayette	Fisher Stadium; Easton, PA	W 52–0		
October 26	at Holy Cross	Fitton Field; Worcester, MA	L 0–3		
November 2	at Tulane	Tulane Stadium; New Orleans, LA	L 6–14	20,000	
November 16	at Syracuse	Archbold Stadium; Syracuse, NY (rivalry)	W 27–0	32,000	
November 23	at Rutgers	Neilson Field; New Brunswick, NJ	W 27–0	10,000	
November 30	at Brown	Brown Stadium; Providence, RI	W 33–0		
