= 1935 Holy Cross Crusaders football team =

American college football season

1935 Holy Cross Crusaders football
- Conference: Independent
- Record: 9–0–1
- Head coach: Eddie Anderson (3rd season)
- Captain: Nicholas Morris
- Home stadium: Fitton Field

1935 Eastern college football independents records
	Conf.			Overall
Team	W	L	T	W		L		T
No. 3 Princeton		–		9	–	0	–	0
No. 14 Holy Cross		–		9	–	0	–	1
NYU		–		7	–	1	–	0
Dartmouth		–		8	–	2	–	0
Northeastern		–		5	–	0	–	3
Syracuse		–		6	–	1	–	1
No. 10 Pittsburgh		–		7	–	1	–	2
No. 11 Fordham		–		6	–	1	–	2
Villanova		–		7	–	2	–	0
Franklin & Marshall		–		7	–	2	–	1
Providence		–		6	–	2	–	0
No. 18 Army		–		6	–	2	–	1
Colgate		–		7	–	3	–	0
Temple		–		7	–	3	–	0
Boston College		–		6	–	3	–	0
Bucknell		–		6	–	3	–	0
Duquesne		–		6	–	3	–	0
Yale		–		6	–	3	–	0
CCNY		–		4	–	3	–	0
Manhattan		–		5	–	3	–	1
Massachusetts State		–		5	–	4	–	0
La Salle		–		4	–	4	–	1
Penn		–		4	–	4	–	0
Penn State		–		4	–	4	–	0
Columbia		–		4	–	4	–	1
Vermont		–		4	–	5	–	0
Boston University		–		3	–	4	–	2
Harvard		–		3	–	5	–	0
Carnegie Tech		–		2	–	5	–	1
Buffalo		–		2	–	6	–	0
Tufts		–		1	–	5	–	2
Brown		–		1	–	8	–	0
Cornell		–		0	–	6	–	1
Rankings from United Press

The 1935 Holy Cross Crusaders football team was an American football team that represented the College of the Holy Cross as an independent during the 1935 college football season. In their third season under head coach Eddie Anderson, the Crusaders compiled a 9–0–1 record. It was the first undefeated season in school history. Nicholas Morris was the team captain.

== Schedule ==
Date	Opponent	Site	Result	Attendance	Source
September 21	Rhode Island State	Fitton Field; Worcester, MA	W 32–0	7,000	
September 28	Providence	Fitton Field; Worcester, MA	W 12–0	3,000	
October 5	Maine	Fitton Field; Worcester, MA	W 47–0		
October 12	at Harvard	Harvard Stadium; Boston, MA	W 13–0		
October 19	Manhattan	Ebbets Field; Brooklyn, NY	T 13–13	15,000	
October 26	Colgate	Fitton Field; Worcester, MA	W 3–0		
November 2	Saint Anselm	Fitton Field; Worcester, MA	W 34–0		
November 9	Carnegie Tech	Fitton Field; Worcester, MA	W 7–0	20,000	
November 16	Bates	Fitton Field; Worcester, MA	W 79–0		
November 30	at Boston College	Alumni Field; Chestnut Hill, MA (rivalry)	W 20–6		
