= Harry Downes =

American football player and coach (1910–1970)

- Downes pictured in Sub Turri 1932, Boston College yearbook

Biographical details
- Born: August 3, 1910
- Died: February 5, 1970 (aged 59); Boston, Massachusetts, U.S.

Playing career
- 1929–1931: Boston College
- Position: Center

Coaching career (HC unless noted)
- 1932: Boston College (line)
- 1933–1934: Reading (MA)
- 1935: Boston College (line)
- 1935: Boston College
- 1936: Boston College (backfield)
- 1937: Quincy HS (MA)
- 1938–1960: Brookline HS (MA)

Administrative career (AD unless noted)
- 1961–1970: Brookline HS (MA)

Head coaching record
- Overall: 3–2 (college)

Accomplishments and honors

Championships
- 4x Massachusetts Class B football champion (1939, 1945, 1946, 1947); Massachusetts Class A football co-champion (1954)

Henry J. "Harry" Downes (August 3, 1910 – February 5, 1970) was an American football player and coach.

== Playing career ==
Downes started his athletic career at Charlestown High School, where he played football, baseball and hockey. After two years, he transferred to The English High School, where he was a star catcher and fullback for baseball and football coach D. Leo Daley and defenseman for hockey coach Ed Wilson. He made the Boston College varsity team as a sophomore and became the team's starting Center his senior year. His football playing career ended in 1931 due to an injury suffered against Holy Cross. He also played for the Boston College hockey and Boston College Eagles baseball team and pitched for Barnstable in the Cape Cod Baseball League in 1933.

== Coaching career ==
Downes was Boston College's line coach under Joe McKenney in 1932. He then spent two years as a teacher and football and baseball coach at Reading High School in Reading, Massachusetts. In 1935, he returned to his former position, this time under first year coach Dinny McNamara. McNamara resigned due to illness after four games and Downes replaced him for the remaining five games. BC went 3–2 in its remaining five games, losing to underdog Western Michigan and rival Holy Cross, and the school chose to hire an experienced coach, Gil Dobie, rather than reappoint Downes. Downes assisted Dobie during the 1936 season while also coaching B.C.'s freshman baseball and hockey teams.

In 1937, Downes became head football coach at Quincy High School in Quincy, Massachusetts. From 1938 until 1960, he was head coach at Brookline High School, where he compiled a 110–71–12 record and won four Class B championships (1939, 1945, 1946, and 1947) and one Class A co-championship (1954). He then served as the school's athletic director until his death in 1970.

== Legacy ==
The football field at Brookline High was named in honor of him, however in 2006 the name was changed to the Kraft Family Athletic Facility at Harry Downes Field after New England Patriots owner and BHS alumnus Robert Kraft donated $400,000 toward the renovation of the field and encouraged the National Football League to donate an additional $200,000 to the project.

== Head coaching record ==
=== College ===
Year	Team	Overall	Conference	Standing	Bowl/playoffs
Boston College Eagles (Independent) (1935)
1935	Boston College	3–2 (Note: Dinny McNamara coached the first four games of the season.)			
Boston College:		3–2			
Total:		3–2			
