= 1935 Dartmouth Indians football team =

American college football season

1935 Dartmouth Indians football
- Conference: Independent
- Record: 8–2
- Head coach: Earl Blaik (2nd season)
- Captain: John Kenny
- Home stadium: Memorial Field

1935 Eastern college football independents records
	Conf.			Overall
Team	W	L	T	W		L		T
No. 3 Princeton		–		9	–	0	–	0
No. 14 Holy Cross		–		9	–	0	–	1
NYU		–		7	–	1	–	0
Dartmouth		–		8	–	2	–	0
Northeastern		–		5	–	0	–	3
Syracuse		–		6	–	1	–	1
No. 10 Pittsburgh		–		7	–	1	–	2
No. 11 Fordham		–		6	–	1	–	2
Villanova		–		7	–	2	–	0
Franklin & Marshall		–		7	–	2	–	1
Providence		–		6	–	2	–	0
No. 18 Army		–		6	–	2	–	1
Colgate		–		7	–	3	–	0
Temple		–		7	–	3	–	0
Boston College		–		6	–	3	–	0
Bucknell		–		6	–	3	–	0
Duquesne		–		6	–	3	–	0
Yale		–		6	–	3	–	0
CCNY		–		4	–	3	–	0
Manhattan		–		5	–	3	–	1
Massachusetts State		–		5	–	4	–	0
La Salle		–		4	–	4	–	1
Penn		–		4	–	4	–	0
Penn State		–		4	–	4	–	0
Columbia		–		4	–	4	–	1
Vermont		–		4	–	5	–	0
Boston University		–		3	–	4	–	2
Harvard		–		3	–	5	–	0
Carnegie Tech		–		2	–	5	–	1
Buffalo		–		2	–	6	–	0
Tufts		–		1	–	5	–	2
Brown		–		1	–	8	–	0
Cornell		–		0	–	6	–	1
Rankings from United Press

The 1935 Dartmouth Indians football team was an American football team that represented Dartmouth College as an independent during the 1935 college football season. In their second season under head coach Earl Blaik, the Indians compiled an 8–2 record. John Kenny was the team captain.

Frank Nairne was the team's leading scorer, with 54 points, from nine touchdowns.

Dartmouth played its home games at Memorial Field on the college campus in Hanover, New Hampshire.

== Schedule ==
Date	Opponent	Site	Result	Attendance	Source
September 30	Norwich	Memorial Field; Hanover, NH	W 39–0		
October 5	Vermont	Memorial Field; Hanover, NH	W 47–0		
October 12	Bates	Memorial Field; Hanover, NH	W 59–0		
October 19	at Brown	Brown Stadium; Providence, RI	W 41–0		
October 26	at Harvard	Harvard Stadium; Boston, MA (rivalry)	W 14–6		
November 2	at Yale	Yale Bowl; New Haven, CT	W 14–6	45,000	
November 9	William & Mary	Memorial Field; Hanover, NH	W 34–0		
November 16	Cornell	Memorial Field; Hanover, NH (rivalry)	W 0–0	10,000	
November 23	at Princeton	Palmer Stadium; Princeton, NJ	L 6–26	56,000	
November 30	at Columbia	Baker Field; New York, NY	L 7–13	20,000	
