= 1935 Princeton Tigers football team =

American college football season

1935 Princeton Tigers football

National champion (Dunkel)
- Conference: Independent
- Record: 9–0
- Head coach: Fritz Crisler (4th season)
- Captain: Pepper Constable
- Home stadium: Palmer Stadium

1935 Eastern college football independents records
| | Conf. | | | Overall |
| Team | W | L | T | W | | L | | T |
|---|---|---|---|---|---|---|---|---|
| No. 3 Princeton | | – | | 9 | – | 0 | – | 0 |
| No. 14 Holy Cross | | – | | 9 | – | 0 | – | 1 |
| NYU | | – | | 7 | – | 1 | – | 0 |
| Dartmouth | | – | | 8 | – | 2 | – | 0 |
| Northeastern | | – | | 5 | – | 0 | – | 3 |
| Syracuse | | – | | 6 | – | 1 | – | 1 |
| No. 10 Pittsburgh | | – | | 7 | – | 1 | – | 2 |
| No. 11 Fordham | | – | | 6 | – | 1 | – | 2 |
| Villanova | | – | | 7 | – | 2 | – | 0 |
| Franklin & Marshall | | – | | 7 | – | 2 | – | 1 |
| Providence | | – | | 6 | – | 2 | – | 0 |
| No. 18 Army | | – | | 6 | – | 2 | – | 1 |
| Colgate | | – | | 7 | – | 3 | – | 0 |
| Temple | | – | | 7 | – | 3 | – | 0 |
| Boston College | | – | | 6 | – | 3 | – | 0 |
| Bucknell | | – | | 6 | – | 3 | – | 0 |
| Duquesne | | – | | 6 | – | 3 | – | 0 |
| Yale | | – | | 6 | – | 3 | – | 0 |
| CCNY | | – | | 4 | – | 3 | – | 0 |
| Manhattan | | – | | 5 | – | 3 | – | 1 |
| Massachusetts State | | – | | 5 | – | 4 | – | 0 |
| La Salle | | – | | 4 | – | 4 | – | 1 |
| Penn | | – | | 4 | – | 4 | – | 0 |
| Penn State | | – | | 4 | – | 4 | – | 0 |
| Columbia | | – | | 4 | – | 4 | – | 1 |
| Vermont | | – | | 4 | – | 5 | – | 0 |
| Boston University | | – | | 3 | – | 4 | – | 2 |
| Harvard | | – | | 3 | – | 5 | – | 0 |
| Carnegie Tech | | – | | 2 | – | 5 | – | 1 |
| Buffalo | | – | | 2 | – | 6 | – | 0 |
| Tufts | | – | | 1 | – | 5 | – | 2 |
| Brown | | – | | 1 | – | 8 | – | 0 |
| Cornell | | – | | 0 | – | 6 | – | 1 |
Rankings from United Press

The 1935 Princeton Tigers football team was an American football team that represented Princeton University as an independent during the 1935 college football season. In its fourth season under head coach Fritz Crisler, the team compiled a 9–0 record and outscored opponents by a total of 256 to 32. The team played its home games at Palmer Stadium in Princeton, New Jersey.

The team was retroactively recognized as the 1935 national champion under the Dunkel System.

Pepper Constable was the team captain. Garry Le Van received the John Prentiss Poe Cup, the team's highest award. Guard Jac Weller was a consensus first-team pick on the 1935 All-America college football team. Six Princeton players were selected by the Associated Press to the 1935 All-Eastern football team: Jac Weller at guard (AP-1); Stephen Cullinan at center (AP-1); Ken Sandbach at quarterback (AP-1); Gilbert Lea at end (AP-2); Charles Toll at tackle (AP-2); and Jack H. White at halfback (AP-2).

== Schedule ==
| Date | Opponent | Site | Result | Attendance | Source |
|---|---|---|---|---|---|
| October 5 | Penn | Palmer Stadium; Princeton, NJ (rivalry) | W 7–6 | 50,000 | |
| October 12 | Williams | Palmer Stadium; Princeton, NJ | W 14–7 | | |
| October 19 | Rutgers | Palmer Stadium; Princeton, NJ (rivalry) | W 29–6 | 25,000 | |
| October 26 | at Cornell | Schoellkopf Field; Ithaca, NY | W 54–0 | | |
| November 2 | Navy | Palmer Stadium; Princeton, NJ | W 26–0 | | |
| November 9 | Harvard | Palmer Stadium; Princeton, NJ (rivalry) | W 35–0 | 50,000 | |
| November 16 | Lehigh | Palmer Stadium; Princeton, NJ | W 27–0 | | |
| November 23 | Dartmouth | Palmer Stadium; Princeton, NJ | W 26–6 | | |
| November 30 | at Yale | Yale Bowl; New Haven, CT (rivalry) | W 38–7 | 55,000 | |

== Roster ==
- William H. Bedel, C
- John F. Bliss
- Charles Carr
- Pepper Constable, FB
- Stephen E. Cullinan
- Richard M. Dicke
- H. Hastings Foster
- Givens, QB
- Campbell C. Groel
- Dean Hill
- John N. Irwin II
- John P. Jones, E
- Charles E. Kaufman, HB
- Robert Y. Kopf, G
- Gilbert Lea, E
- Garret B. LeVan, HB
- Hugh A. MacMillan, E
- James L. Marks
- T. William Montgomery, G
- Paul Pauk
- William S. Rawls
- A. Frederick Ritter, T
- William W. Roper
- George W. Russell
- E. Kenneth Sandbach, QB
- Homer Spofford, HB
- George J. Stoess, T
- Charles H. Toll
- Jac Weller, G
- Jack H. White, HB
