= Dunkel Index =

American college football rating system

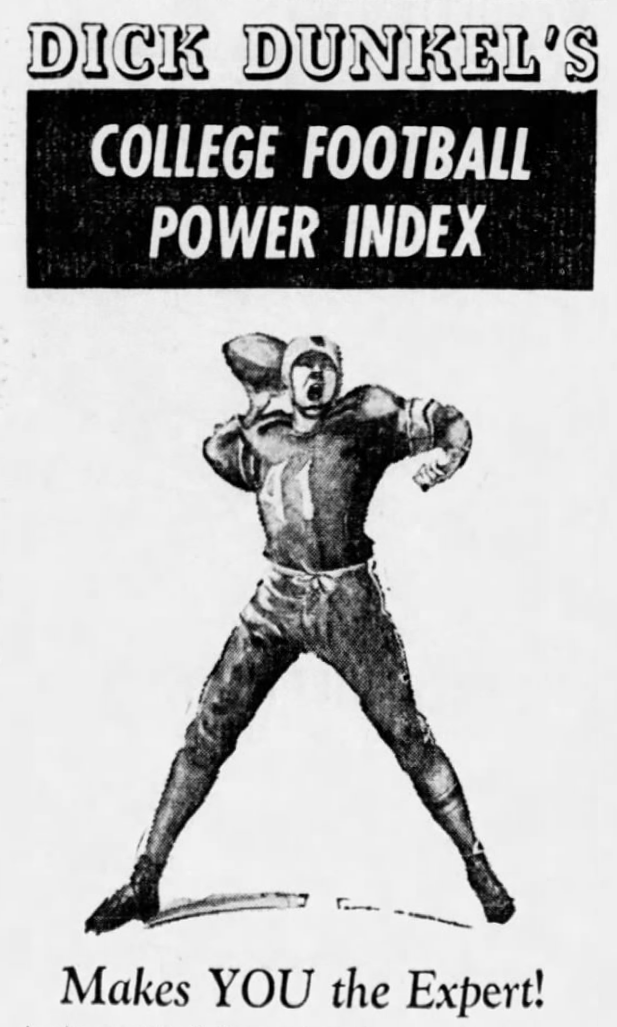
- Abbreviation: DuS
- Formation: 1929
- Purpose: college football ratings, national championship selections
- Website: https://www.dunkelindex.com/

The Dunkel Index, also known as the Dunkel College Football Index, is a sports team rating system and pick service originally developed in 1929 by Richard C. "Dick" Dunkel, Sr. (1906–1975) to mathematically calculate the best college football teams. Dunkel rated college football teams from 1929 until his death in 1975. His ratings are recognized by the National Collegiate Athletic Association (NCAA) in its Football Bowl Subdivision record book. The NCAA describes Dunkel's methodology as a "power index system." Dunkel described his system an index and claimed that "his difference by scores is scientifically produced." It was cited as the first college football ratings system.

From the late 1930s through the early 1960s, Dunkel also hosted a weekly radio program called "Dick Dunkel Football Forecasts".

Dunkel died at age 69 in December 1975 at Daytona Beach, Florida. From 1975 to 2002, Dunkel's son, Dick Dunkel, Jr., continued to issue ratings, but the popularity of the syndicated service declined. Starting in 2002, the rankings were prepared jointly by Dick Dunkel, Jr., Bob Dunkel, and John Duck, executive producer of the Daytona Beach News Journal.

== Dunkel college football national champions ==
The following list identifies the college football national champions as selected by the Dunkel Index, according to the 2015 NCAA Football Bowl Subdivision Records book.

Season	Champion
1929	Notre Dame
1930	Notre Dame
1931	USC
1932	USC
1933	Ohio State
1934	Alabama
1935	Princeton
1936	Minnesota
1937	California
1938	Tennessee
1939	Texas A&M
1940	Tennessee
1941	Minnesota
1942	Ohio State
1943	Notre Dame
1944	Army
1945	Army
1946	Notre Dame
1947	Michigan
1948	Michigan
1949	Notre Dame
1950	Tennessee
1951	Maryland
1952	Michigan State
1953	Notre Dame
1954	UCLA
1955	Oklahoma
1956	Oklahoma
1957	Michigan State
1958	LSU
1959	Ole Miss
1960	Ole Miss
1961	Alabama
1962	USC
1963	Texas
1964	Michigan
1965	Michigan State
1966	Notre Dame
1967	Notre Dame
1968	Ohio State
1969	Texas
1970	Nebraska
1971	Nebraska
1972	USC
1973	Oklahoma
1974	Oklahoma
1975	Oklahoma
1976	USC
1977	Notre Dame
1978	Oklahoma
1979	Alabama
1980	Oklahoma
1981	Penn State
1982	Penn State
1983	Miami
1984	Florida
1985	Oklahoma
1986	Oklahoma
1987	Miami
1988	Notre Dame
1989	Miami
1990	Georgia Tech
1991	Washington
1992	Alabama
1993	Florida State
1994	Florida State
1995	Nebraska
1996	Florida
1997	Nebraska
1998	Tennessee
1999	Florida State
2000	Oklahoma
2001	Miami
2002	USC
2003	LSU
2004	USC
2005	Texas
2006	Florida
2007	USC†
2008	Florida
2009	Alabama
2010	Auburn
2011	Alabama
2012	Alabama
2013	Florida State

† Dunkel's archived official website gives USC as its 2007 selection, while the 2017 NCAA Football Bowl Subdivision Records book lists Dunkel's selection as LSU.

The July, 2023, website for the Dunkel Index displays revised rankings for seasons from 2002 to the present, based on "index rating for the season adjusted by won/loss record", which results in different top-ranked teams (compared to the Dunkel "pure index rating") for the 2005 through 2010 seasons (specifically, USC, Ohio State, LSU, USC, Texas, and Oregon, in that chronological order).

== Other sports ==
Dunkel started continuously issuing college basketball ratings in 1935. Weekly ratings were eventually distributed by Converse, Sears, and Pabst Brewing Company starting as early as 1939. After Dick passed down duties to his son, Dick Jr. and his brother Bob began rating professional basketball and football teams. Today, sports include football, basketball, baseball, hockey, and soccer.

== See also ==
- NCAA Division I FBS national football championship
