= 1935 college football rankings =

- Season: 1935
- Bowl season: 1935–36 bowl games
- End of season champions: Minnesota (Note: per Boand System, Litkenhous Ratings, Poling System, Toledo Cup, Billingsley Report, College Football Researchers Association, Helms Athletic Foundation, National Championship Foundation; co champion (alongside Princeton and SMU)); SMU (Note: per Dickinson System, Houlgate System, Berryman QPRS, Sagarin Ratings Elo chess method, and Sagarin Ratings Predictor method; co champion (alongside Minnesota and Princeton)); Princeton (Note: per Dunkel System; co-champion (alongside Minnesota and SMU)); TCU (Note: per Williamson System. The NCAA Football Bowl Subdivision Records book lists the Williamson System as having selected TCU and LSU as co-champions for 1935. However, the system's post-bowl final rankings published in January 1936 show TCU first, SMU second, and LSU third. The accompanying column written by Paul B. Williamson states, "There was no undisputable national champion in 1935".)

The 1935 college football rankings included (1) a United Press (UP) poll of sports writers, (2) a poll of sports editors conducted by the committee responsible for awarding the Toledo Cup to the nation's top college football team, and the (3) Boand, (4) Dickinson, and (5) Houlgate Systems. The Minnesota Golden Gophers (8–0), led by head coach Bernie Bierman, were selected as national champions in the UP poll, the Toledo Cup voting, and the Boand System. The SMU Mustangs (12–0 prior to losing the 1936 Rose Bowl), led by consensus All-Americans Bob Wilson and J. C. Wetsel, were selected as national champions by Dickinson and Houlgate.

== Champions (by ranking) ==
Major rankings (both contemporary and retroactive) have varied in who they identify as the season champion(s). Schools identified as 1935 season champions by at least one such ranking include: Minnesota, Princeton, SMU, and TCU as season champions:

- Berryman QPRS: SMU
- Billingsley Report: Minnesota
- Boand System: Minnesota
- College Football Researchers Association: Minnesota
- Dickinson System: SMU
- Dunkel System: Princeton
- Helms Athletic Foundation: Minnesota
- Houlgate System: SMU
- Litkenhous Ratings: Minnesota
- National Championship Foundation: Minnesota
- Poling System: Minnesota
- Sagarin Ratings Elo chess method: SMU
- Sagarin Ratings Predictor method: SMU
- Toledo Cup: Minnesota
- Williamson System: TCU

Note: Boand System, Dickinson System, Dunkel System, Houlgate System, Litkenhous Ratings, Poling System, Toledo Cup, and Williamson System were given contemporarily. All other methods were given retroactively.

== Associated Press rankings ==
Weekly top ten rankings were published by the Associated Press news service throughout the season. The rankings were made solely by Associated Press sports editor Alan Gould. Gould's final rankings on December 3, 1935, declared a three-way tie for first between SMU, Princeton, and Minnesota. Gould's stated desire for content to fill space between games by encouraging controversy and "hoopla" led Gould to poll the nation's sportswriters in subsequent years; thus the AP Poll would officially begin in 1936.

Rank	Team
1	SMU
1	Princeton
1	Minnesota
4	LSU
4	TCU
6	Stanford
7	Ohio State
8	North Carolina
9	California
10	Fordham

== United Press poll ==
At the end of the regular season, the United Press (UP) polled 141 sports writers from all sections of the country. Each writer was asked to rank the top ten teams, and the UP then assigned points with ten points being awarded to a first-place vote, nine points for a second-place vote, etc. The leaders in the poll were:

Rank	Team	Points	1st	2nd	3rd	4th	5th	6th	7th	8th	9th	10th
1	Minnesota	1,366	98	34	10	0	0	0	0	0	0	0
2	SMU	1,246	30	68	30	12	0	0	0	0	2	0
3	Princeton	1,008	12	20	52	14	16	14	2	6	0	2
4	TCU	790	0	2	12	36	32	26	20	4	2	6
5	Ohio State	764	0	10	16	22	24	14	28	16	8	2
6	Stanford	720	2	2	6	16	36	40	14	10	6	8
7	LSU	629	0	5	8	20	18	24	18	16	8	4
8	Notre Dame	459	0	1	6	12	12	8	18	26	24	8
9	California	292	0	0	0	2	0	8	20	28	28	28
10	Pittsburgh	138	0	0	0	0	3	2	4	12	22	14

The following teams were ranked below the top 10:

11. Fordham
12. North Carolina
13. Duke
14. Holy Cross
15. Auburn
16. Northwestern
17. Alabama
18. (tie) Army, Iowa, UCLA
21. (tie) Nebraska, Ohio
23. (tie) Marquette, Washington, Saint Mary's
26. (tie) Temple, Dartmouth, NYU

== Toledo Cup ==
The Toledo Cup was presented to the college football national champion. Overseen by a committee including westbrook Pegler, Avery Brundage, Gustavus Kirby, Lynn St. John, Wilbur C. Smith, Stewart Edward White, and Theodore Roosevelt Jr., the Toledo Cup award was based on input from a judge's committee of 250 sports editors of leading newspapers.

A preliminary vote was taken in December 1935 with the following results:

1. Minnesota - 840 points
2. Princeton - 379 points
3. SMU - 347 points
4. TCU - 71 points
5. Ohio State - 52 points
6. LSU - 24 points
7. Notre Dame - 23 points
8. Stanford - 22 points
9. California - 9 points
10. Pittsburgh - 2 points
11. (tie) Dartmouth, Alabama, Northwestern, and Saint Mary's - 1 point each

The final vote of the committee was taken in January 1936 with the following results:

1. Minnesota - 168 votes
2. SMU - 46 votes
3. Princeton - 22 votes

It was Minnesota's second consecutive year winning the Toledo Cup.

== Boand System ==
The Boand System was a mathematical rating system, also known as the "Azzi Ratem" system, developed by W. F. Boand. The Boand ratings released in early December 1935 were as follows:

1. Minnesota - 170 points
2. SMU - 165 points
3. Princeton - 160 points
4. Ohio State - 159 points
5. LSU - 157 points
6. Notre Dame - 152 points
7. California - 151 points
8. TCU - 149 points
9. Pittsburgh - 147 points
10. Stanford - 144 points
11. Nebraska - 143 points
12. Auburn - 142 points

== Dickinson System ==
The Dickinson System was a mathematical rating system devised by University of Illinois economics professor Frank G. Dickinson. In his 1935 rankings, Dickinson weighted each team's performance based on the strength of the conferences, reported as follows: Big Ten (+3.78), SWC (+3.31), East (0.00), Pacific Coast (-0.11), SEC (-0.12), Big Six (-1.95) and Southern (-6.15) The final Dickinson System rankings for 1935 were released in December 1935, prior to SMU's loss to Stanford in the Rose Bowl. Dickinson ranked the top 11 teams as follows:

1. SMU (12-0) - 28.01 points
2. Minnesota (8-0) - 27.35 points
3. Princeton (9-0) - 26.00 points
4. LSU (9-1-1) - 24.03 points
5. (tie) Stanford (7-1) - 23.11 points
5. (tie) California (9-1) - 23.11 points
7. Ohio State (7-1) - 22.21 points
8. TCU (10-1) - 22.01 points
9. Notre Dame (7-1-1) - 21.66 points
10. UCLA (8-2) - 21.25 points
11. Fordham (6-1-2) - 20.89 points

Northwestern, North Carolina, and Dartmouth followed.

== Houlgate ==
In early December 1935, Deke Houlgate released his Houlgate System rankings as follows:

1. SMU
2. Princeton
3. LSU
4. California
5. Minnesota
6. TCU
7. Notre Dame
8. Tie: Holy Cross (9–0–1), Ohio State, Stanford
11. Pittsburgh
12. Tie: Fordham (6–1–2), Rice (8–3)
14. Tie: Duke, UCLA
16. North Carolina
17. Alabama
18. Auburn
19. Marquette (7–1)
20. Michigan State (6–2)
21. NYU (7–1)
22. Nebraska (6–2–1)
23. Tie: Catholic University (8–1), Furman (8–1)
25. Villanova (7–2)
26. Saint Mary's (5–2–2)
27. Tie: Army (6–2–1), Mississippi State (8–3)
29. Tie: Bucknell (6–3), Temple (7–3)
31. Tie: Oregon (6–3), Syracuse (6–1–1)
33. Vanderbilt (7–3–1)
34. Maryland (7–2–2)
35. Ole Miss (9–3)
36. Iowa (4–2–2)
37. Dartmouth (8–2)
38. Baylor (8–3)
39. Tie: Detroit (6–3), Yale (6–3)
41. Northwestern (4–3–1)
42. Clemson (6–3)
43. Georgia (6–4)
44. Tie: Colgate (7–3), Washington
46. Tie: NC State (6–4), Tulane (6–4)
48. Duquesne (6–3)
49. Boston College (6–3)
50. Tie: Indiana (4–3–1), Michigan (4–4), Navy (5–4), Penn State (4–4), Western Maryland

== See also ==
- 1935 College Football All-America Team
