= 1935 Mississippi State Teachers Yellow Jackets football team =

American college football season

1935 Mississippi State Teachers Yellow Jackets football
- Conference: Southern Intercollegiate Athletic Association
- Record: 6–4 (5–1 SIAA)
- Head coach: Pooley Hubert (5th season)
- Home stadium: Faulkner Field

1935 Southern Intercollegiate Athletic Association football standings
	Conf.					Overall
Team	W		L		T	W		L		T
Middle Tennessee State Teachers $	5	–	0	–	0	8	–	0	–	0
Howard (AL)	5	–	0	–	1	7	–	1	–	2
Furman	4	–	0	–	0	8	–	1	–	0
Centenary	3	–	0	–	0	6	–	5	–	0
Union (KY)	2	–	0	–	2	3	–	1	–	2
Southwestern (TN)	2	–	0	–	2	3	–	4	–	3
Louisiana Tech	7	–	1	–	0	8	–	1	–	0
Mississippi State Teachers	5	–	1	–	0	6	–	4	–	0
Stetson	4	–	1	–	0	7	–	2	–	0
The Citadel	4	–	1	–	0	4	–	3	–	1
Transylvania	3	–	1	–	0	5	–	3	–	0
Georgetown (KY)	3	–	1	–	1	5	–	2	–	1
Western Kentucky State Teachers	5	–	2	–	0	7	–	3	–	0
Wofford	3	–	2	–	1	4	–	4	–	1
Louisiana College	4	–	4	–	0	6	–	4	–	0
Miami (FL)	1	–	1	–	0	5	–	3	–	0
Millsaps	2	–	2	–	1	4	–	4	–	2
Mercer	1	–	1	–	0	4	–	5	–	0
Centre	1	–	1	–	0	1	–	7	–	1
Union (TN)	2	–	3	–	1	6	–	4	–	1
Eastern Kentucky State Teachers	2	–	3	–	1	4	–	4	–	1
Murray State	2	–	4	–	0	4	–	5	–	0
Presbyterian	2	–	4	–	0	2	–	7	–	0
Rollins	1	–	3	–	0	2	–	5	–	0
Loyola (LA)	1	–	3	–	0	2	–	6	–	1
Newberry	1	–	4	–	0	2	–	8	–	0
SW Louisiana	1	–	4	–	0	2	–	8	–	0
Louisville	1	–	4	–	0	1	–	6	–	1
Louisiana Normal	1	–	5	–	0	2	–	9	–	0
West Tennessee State Teachers	0	–	3	–	1	1	–	6	–	1
Erskine	0	–	4	–	1	1	–	6	–	1
Mississippi College	0	–	5	–	1	2	–	6	–	1
Tennessee Tech	0	–	5	–	1	1	–	6	–	1
Morehead State	0	–	5	–	0	1	–	6	–	0
$ – Conference champion

The 1935 Mississippi State Teachers Yellow Jackets football team was an American football team that represented the Mississippi State Teachers College (now known as the University of Southern Mississippi) as a member of the Southern Intercollegiate Athletic Association during the 1935 college football season. In their fifth year under head coach Pooley Hubert, the team compiled a 6–4 record.

== Schedule ==
Date	Time	Opponent	Site	Result	Source
September 20		at Jones County Junior College*	Ellisville, MS	W 7–0	
October 5		Louisiana College	Faulkner Field; Hattiesburg, MS	W 12–0	
October 12		Troy State*	Faulkner Field; Hattiesburg, MS	L 13–14	
October 18	7:45 p.m.	Louisiana Normal	Faulkner Field; Hattiesburg, MS	W 26–12	
October 26	2:00 p.m.	at West Tennessee State Teachers	Memorial Field; Memphis, TN (rivalry)	W 12–0	
November 1		at Spring Hill*	Dorn Stadium; Mobile, AL	L 0–19	
November 8		at Southwestern Louisiana	Lake Charles, LA	W 19–7	
November 15		Mississippi State*^{†}	Faulkner Field; Hattiesburg, MS	L 0–27	
November 28		at Louisiana Tech	Tech Stadium; Ruston, LA (rivalry)	L 0–27	
December 7		Union (TN)	Faulkner Field; Hattiesburg, MS	W 12–6	
*Non-conference game; ^{†}Homecoming; All times are in Central time
