= 1935 West Tennessee State Teachers football team =

American college football season

1935 West Tennessee State Teachers football
- Conference: Southern Intercollegiate Athletic Association
- Record: 1–6–1 (0–3–1 SIAA)
- Head coach: Zach Curlin (12th season)
- Captain: Christian Pontius
- Home stadium: Memorial Field

1935 Southern Intercollegiate Athletic Association football standings
	Conf.					Overall
Team	W		L		T	W		L		T
Middle Tennessee State Teachers $	5	–	0	–	0	8	–	0	–	0
Howard (AL)	5	–	0	–	1	7	–	1	–	2
Furman	4	–	0	–	0	8	–	1	–	0
Centenary	3	–	0	–	0	6	–	5	–	0
Union (KY)	2	–	0	–	2	3	–	1	–	2
Southwestern (TN)	2	–	0	–	2	3	–	4	–	3
Louisiana Tech	7	–	1	–	0	8	–	1	–	0
Mississippi State Teachers	5	–	1	–	0	6	–	4	–	0
Stetson	4	–	1	–	0	7	–	2	–	0
The Citadel	4	–	1	–	0	4	–	3	–	1
Transylvania	3	–	1	–	0	5	–	3	–	0
Georgetown (KY)	3	–	1	–	1	5	–	2	–	1
Western Kentucky State Teachers	5	–	2	–	0	7	–	3	–	0
Wofford	3	–	2	–	1	4	–	4	–	1
Louisiana College	4	–	4	–	0	6	–	4	–	0
Miami (FL)	1	–	1	–	0	5	–	3	–	0
Millsaps	2	–	2	–	1	4	–	4	–	2
Mercer	1	–	1	–	0	4	–	5	–	0
Centre	1	–	1	–	0	1	–	7	–	1
Union (TN)	2	–	3	–	1	6	–	4	–	1
Eastern Kentucky State Teachers	2	–	3	–	1	4	–	4	–	1
Murray State	2	–	4	–	0	4	–	5	–	0
Presbyterian	2	–	4	–	0	2	–	7	–	0
Rollins	1	–	3	–	0	2	–	5	–	0
Loyola (LA)	1	–	3	–	0	2	–	6	–	1
Newberry	1	–	4	–	0	2	–	8	–	0
SW Louisiana	1	–	4	–	0	2	–	8	–	0
Louisville	1	–	4	–	0	1	–	6	–	1
Louisiana Normal	1	–	5	–	0	2	–	9	–	0
West Tennessee State Teachers	0	–	3	–	1	1	–	6	–	1
Erskine	0	–	4	–	1	1	–	6	–	1
Mississippi College	0	–	5	–	1	2	–	6	–	1
Tennessee Tech	0	–	5	–	1	1	–	6	–	1
Morehead State	0	–	5	–	0	1	–	6	–	0
$ – Conference champion

The 1935 West Tennessee State Teachers football team was an American football team that represented the West Tennessee State Teachers College (now known as the University of Memphis) as a member of the Southern Intercollegiate Athletic Association during the 1935 college football season. In their twelfth season under head coach Zach Curlin, West Tennessee State Teachers compiled a 1–6–1 record.

== Schedule ==
Date	Time	Opponent	Site	Result	Attendance	Source
September 28		at Ole Miss*	Hemingway Stadium; Oxford, MS (rivalry)	L 0–92		
October 4		at Arkansas State*	Kays Field; Jonesboro, AR (rivalry)	L 0–18		
October 12	2:30 p.m.	Arkansas State Teachers*	Memorial Field; Memphis, TN	L 0–19	1,000	
October 18		at Middle Tennessee State Teachers	Horace Jones Field; Murfreesboro, TN	L 0–35		
October 26	2:00 p.m.	Mississippi State Teachers	Memorial Field; Memphis, TN (rivalry)	L 0–12		
November 2	2:20 p.m.	Union (TN)^{†}	Memorial Field; Memphis, TN	L 0–33		
November 16	2:00 p.m.	Tennessee Tech	Memorial Field; Memphis, TN	T 0–0	200	
November 23	2:00 p.m.	Delta State*	Memorial Field; Memphis, TN	W 30–0		
*Non-conference game; ^{†}Homecoming; All times are in Central time
