= 1935 Tampa Spartans football team =

American college football season

1935 Tampa Spartans football
- Conference: Independent
- Record: 5–5
- Head coach: Nash Higgins (3rd season)
- Home stadium: Plant Field

1935 Southern college football independents records
	Conf.			Overall
Team	W	L	T	W		L		T
Catholic University		–		8	–	1	–	0
William & Mary Norfolk		–		8	–	1	–	0
Texas Wesleyan		–		8	–	2	–	1
George Washington		–		6	–	3	–	0
Hardin–Simmons		–		6	–	3	–	1
Tennessee State		–		4	–	3	–	1
Navy		–		5	–	4	–	0
Western Maryland		–		6	–	5	–	0
East Carolina		–		3	–	3	–	0
Georgetown		–		4	–	4	–	0
Tampa		–		5	–	5	–	0
Troy State		–		5	–	5	–	0
South Georgia Teachers		–		3	–	3	–	2
West Virginia		–		3	–	4	–	2
Oklahoma City		–		3	–	4	–	1
Texas A&I		–		3	–	5	–	0
Delaware		–		2	–	5	–	1
Jacksonville State		–		2	–	5	–	0
Wake Forest		–		2	–	7	–	0
Oglethorpe		–		1	–	8	–	0

The 1935 Tampa Spartans football team represented the University of Tampa as an independent during the 1935 college football season. Led by Nash Higgins in his third season as head coach, the Spartans compiled an overall record of 5–5. The team played home games at Plant Field in Tampa, Florida.

== Schedule ==
Date	Time	Opponent	Site	Result	Attendance	Source
October 18	8:00 p.m.	South Georgia Teachers	Plant Field; Tampa, FL	W 19–0	5,000	
October 25		at Miami (FL)	Miami Stadium; Miami, FL	W 13–7	3,500	
October 31		at Newberry	Setzler Field; Newberry, SC	W 12–7		
November 4		at Rollins	Tinker Field; Orlando, FL	W 19–6		
November 13		Cumberland (TN)	Plant Field; Tampa, FL	L 12–13	6,500	
November 15	8:00 p.m.	Stetson	Plant Field; Tampa, FL	L 7–9	5,000	
November 22		Troy State	Plant Field; Tampa, FL	W 9–7		
November 28		at Western Kentucky State Teachers	Bowling Green, KY	L 0–18		
December 14		Louisiana Tech	Plant Field; Tampa, FL	L 7–32	1,500	
December 25		Lebanon Valley	Plant Field; Tampa, FL	L 0–6		
All times are in Eastern time
