= 1935 Louisiana Tech Bulldogs football team =

American college football season

1935 Louisiana Tech Bulldogs football
- Conference: Southern Intercollegiate Athletic Association
- Record: 8–1 (7–1 SIAA)
- Head coach: Eddie McLane (2nd season)
- Captain: Madison Brooks
- Home stadium: Tech Stadium

1935 Southern Intercollegiate Athletic Association football standings
	Conf.					Overall
Team	W		L		T	W		L		T
Middle Tennessee State Teachers $	5	–	0	–	0	8	–	0	–	0
Howard (AL)	5	–	0	–	1	7	–	1	–	2
Furman	4	–	0	–	0	8	–	1	–	0
Centenary	3	–	0	–	0	6	–	5	–	0
Union (KY)	2	–	0	–	2	3	–	1	–	2
Southwestern (TN)	2	–	0	–	2	3	–	4	–	3
Louisiana Tech	7	–	1	–	0	8	–	1	–	0
Mississippi State Teachers	5	–	1	–	0	6	–	4	–	0
Stetson	4	–	1	–	0	7	–	2	–	0
The Citadel	4	–	1	–	0	4	–	3	–	1
Transylvania	3	–	1	–	0	5	–	3	–	0
Georgetown (KY)	3	–	1	–	1	5	–	2	–	1
Western Kentucky State Teachers	5	–	2	–	0	7	–	3	–	0
Wofford	3	–	2	–	1	4	–	4	–	1
Louisiana College	4	–	4	–	0	6	–	4	–	0
Miami (FL)	1	–	1	–	0	5	–	3	–	0
Millsaps	2	–	2	–	1	4	–	4	–	2
Mercer	1	–	1	–	0	4	–	5	–	0
Centre	1	–	1	–	0	1	–	7	–	1
Union (TN)	2	–	3	–	1	6	–	4	–	1
Eastern Kentucky State Teachers	2	–	3	–	1	4	–	4	–	1
Murray State	2	–	4	–	0	4	–	5	–	0
Presbyterian	2	–	4	–	0	2	–	7	–	0
Rollins	1	–	3	–	0	2	–	5	–	0
Loyola (LA)	1	–	3	–	0	2	–	6	–	1
Newberry	1	–	4	–	0	2	–	8	–	0
SW Louisiana	1	–	4	–	0	2	–	8	–	0
Louisville	1	–	4	–	0	1	–	6	–	1
Louisiana Normal	1	–	5	–	0	2	–	9	–	0
West Tennessee State Teachers	0	–	3	–	1	1	–	6	–	1
Erskine	0	–	4	–	1	1	–	6	–	1
Mississippi College	0	–	5	–	1	2	–	6	–	1
Tennessee Tech	0	–	5	–	1	1	–	6	–	1
Morehead State	0	–	5	–	0	1	–	6	–	0
$ – Conference champion

The 1935 Louisiana Tech Bulldogs football team was an American football team that represented the Louisiana Polytechnic Institute (now known as Louisiana Tech University) as a member of the Southern Intercollegiate Athletic Association during the 1935 college football season. In their second year under head coach Eddie McLane, the team compiled a 8–1 record.

== Schedule ==
Date	Time	Opponent	Site	Result	Attendance	Source
October 4		Tennessee Tech	Tech Stadium; Ruston, LA	W 44–0	4,000	
October 11		Southwestern Louisiana	Tech Stadium; Ruston, LA (rivalry)	W 25–0		
October 19		Union (TN)	Tech Stadium; Ruston, LA	W 27–0		
October 26	2:30 p.m.	Louisiana Normal^{†}	Tech Stadium; Ruston, LA (rivalry)	W 32–0	4,000	
November 1		Millsaps	Tech Stadium; Ruston, LA	L 20–21		
November 8		Mississippi College	Tech Stadium; Ruston, LA	W 21–7		
November 23		at Louisiana College	Alumni Field; Pineville, LA	W 27–7		
November 28		Mississippi Teachers	Tech Stadium; Ruston, LA (rivalry)	W 27–0		
December 14		at Tampa*	Plant Field; Tampa, FL	W 32–7	1,500	
*Non-conference game; ^{†}Homecoming; All times are in Central time
