= 1935 Loyola Wolf Pack football team =

American college football season

1935 Loyola Wolf Pack football
- Conference: Dixie Conference, Southern Intercollegiate Athletic Association
- Record: 2–6–1 (2–2 Dixie, 1–3 SIAA)
- Head coach: Eddie Reed (2nd season)
- Home stadium: Loyola University Stadium

1935 Dixie Conference football standings
	Conf.					Overall
Team	W		L		T	W		L		T
Howard (AL) $	3	–	0	–	1	7	–	1	–	2
Chattanooga	3	–	1	–	1	4	–	3	–	1
Spring Hill	2	–	1	–	2	7	–	2	–	2
Millsaps	1	–	1	–	2	4	–	4	–	2
Southwestern (TN)	2	–	2	–	2	3	–	4	–	2
Mercer	1	–	1	–	0	4	–	5	–	0
Loyola (LA)	2	–	2	–	0	2	–	6	–	1
Birmingham–Southern	2	–	5	–	0	2	–	6	–	0
Mississippi College	1	–	4	–	1	2	–	6	–	1
Centre	0	–	0	–	1	1	–	7	–	1
$ – Conference champion

1935 Southern Intercollegiate Athletic Association football standings
	Conf.					Overall
Team	W		L		T	W		L		T
Middle Tennessee State Teachers $	5	–	0	–	0	8	–	0	–	0
Howard (AL)	5	–	0	–	1	7	–	1	–	2
Furman	4	–	0	–	0	8	–	1	–	0
Centenary	3	–	0	–	0	6	–	5	–	0
Union (KY)	2	–	0	–	2	3	–	1	–	2
Southwestern (TN)	2	–	0	–	2	3	–	4	–	3
Louisiana Tech	7	–	1	–	0	8	–	1	–	0
Mississippi State Teachers	5	–	1	–	0	6	–	4	–	0
Stetson	4	–	1	–	0	7	–	2	–	0
The Citadel	4	–	1	–	0	4	–	3	–	1
Transylvania	3	–	1	–	0	5	–	3	–	0
Georgetown (KY)	3	–	1	–	1	5	–	2	–	1
Western Kentucky State Teachers	5	–	2	–	0	7	–	3	–	0
Wofford	3	–	2	–	1	4	–	4	–	1
Louisiana College	4	–	4	–	0	6	–	4	–	0
Miami (FL)	1	–	1	–	0	5	–	3	–	0
Millsaps	2	–	2	–	1	4	–	4	–	2
Mercer	1	–	1	–	0	4	–	5	–	0
Centre	1	–	1	–	0	1	–	7	–	1
Union (TN)	2	–	3	–	1	6	–	4	–	1
Eastern Kentucky State Teachers	2	–	3	–	1	4	–	4	–	1
Murray State	2	–	4	–	0	4	–	5	–	0
Presbyterian	2	–	4	–	0	2	–	7	–	0
Rollins	1	–	3	–	0	2	–	5	–	0
Loyola (LA)	1	–	3	–	0	2	–	6	–	1
Newberry	1	–	4	–	0	2	–	8	–	0
SW Louisiana	1	–	4	–	0	2	–	8	–	0
Louisville	1	–	4	–	0	1	–	6	–	1
Louisiana Normal	1	–	5	–	0	2	–	9	–	0
West Tennessee State Teachers	0	–	3	–	1	1	–	6	–	1
Erskine	0	–	4	–	1	1	–	6	–	1
Mississippi College	0	–	5	–	1	2	–	6	–	1
Tennessee Tech	0	–	5	–	1	1	–	6	–	1
Morehead State	0	–	5	–	0	1	–	6	–	0
$ – Conference champion

The 1935 Loyola Wolf Pack football team was an American football team that represented Loyola College of New Orleans (now known as Loyola University New Orleans) as a member of the Dixie Conference and the Southern Intercollegiate Athletic Association (SIAA) during the 1935 college football season. In its second non-consecutive season under head coach Eddie Reed, the team compiled a 2–6–1 record and was outscored by a total of 101 to 88. The team played its home games at Loyola University Stadium in New Orleans.

== Schedule ==
Date	Opponent	Site	Result	Attendance	Source
September 27	Spring Hill	Loyola University Stadium; New Orleans, LA	L 6–12		
October 4	Birmingham–Southern	Loyola University Stadium; New Orleans, LA	W 20–13		
October 11	Howard (AL)	Loyola University Stadium; New Orleans, LA	L 0–21		
October 18	Mississippi State*	Loyola University Stadium; New Orleans, LA	L 0–6		
October 25	at Louisiana College	Alumni Field; Pineville, LA	L 6–7		
November 1	Centenary	Loyola University Stadium; New Orleans, LA	L 0–9	8,500	
November 8	TCU*	Loyola University Stadium; New Orleans, LA	L 0–14	6,000	
November 15	Mississippi College	Loyola University Stadium; New Orleans, LA	W 37–0	5,000	
November 28	West Virginia*	Loyola University Stadium; New Orleans, LA	T 19–19	8,000	
*Non-conference game
