= 1935 Centenary Gentlemen football team =

American college football season

1935 Centenary Gentlemen football
- Conference: Southern Intercollegiate Athletic Association
- Record: 6–5 (3–0 SIAA)
- Head coach: Curtis Parker (2nd season)
- Home stadium: Centenary Field

1935 Southern Intercollegiate Athletic Association football standings
	Conf.					Overall
Team	W		L		T	W		L		T
Middle Tennessee State Teachers $	5	–	0	–	0	8	–	0	–	0
Howard (AL)	5	–	0	–	1	7	–	1	–	2
Furman	4	–	0	–	0	8	–	1	–	0
Centenary	3	–	0	–	0	6	–	5	–	0
Union (KY)	2	–	0	–	2	3	–	1	–	2
Southwestern (TN)	2	–	0	–	2	3	–	4	–	3
Louisiana Tech	7	–	1	–	0	8	–	1	–	0
Mississippi State Teachers	5	–	1	–	0	6	–	4	–	0
Stetson	4	–	1	–	0	7	–	2	–	0
The Citadel	4	–	1	–	0	4	–	3	–	1
Transylvania	3	–	1	–	0	5	–	3	–	0
Georgetown (KY)	3	–	1	–	1	5	–	2	–	1
Western Kentucky State Teachers	5	–	2	–	0	7	–	3	–	0
Wofford	3	–	2	–	1	4	–	4	–	1
Louisiana College	4	–	4	–	0	6	–	4	–	0
Miami (FL)	1	–	1	–	0	5	–	3	–	0
Millsaps	2	–	2	–	1	4	–	4	–	2
Mercer	1	–	1	–	0	4	–	5	–	0
Centre	1	–	1	–	0	1	–	7	–	1
Union (TN)	2	–	3	–	1	6	–	4	–	1
Eastern Kentucky State Teachers	2	–	3	–	1	4	–	4	–	1
Murray State	2	–	4	–	0	4	–	5	–	0
Presbyterian	2	–	4	–	0	2	–	7	–	0
Rollins	1	–	3	–	0	2	–	5	–	0
Loyola (LA)	1	–	3	–	0	2	–	6	–	1
Newberry	1	–	4	–	0	2	–	8	–	0
SW Louisiana	1	–	4	–	0	2	–	8	–	0
Louisville	1	–	4	–	0	1	–	6	–	1
Louisiana Normal	1	–	5	–	0	2	–	9	–	0
West Tennessee State Teachers	0	–	3	–	1	1	–	6	–	1
Erskine	0	–	4	–	1	1	–	6	–	1
Mississippi College	0	–	5	–	1	2	–	6	–	1
Tennessee Tech	0	–	5	–	1	1	–	6	–	1
Morehead State	0	–	5	–	0	1	–	6	–	0
$ – Conference champion

The 1935 Centenary Gentlemen football team was an American football team that represented the Centenary College of Louisiana as a member of the Southern Intercollegiate Athletic Association during the 1935 college football season. In their second year under head coach Curtis Parker, the team compiled a 6–5 record.

Backfield coach Elza Renfro died two days after the season opener due to blood poisoning.

== Schedule ==
Date	Time	Opponent	Site	Result	Attendance	Source
September 19		at Louisiana College	Alumni Field; Pineville, LA	W 21–0		
September 28	3:00 p.m.	Louisiana Normal	Centenary Field; Shreveport, LA	W 21–0	3,500	
October 5		Arizona*	Centenary Field; Shreveport, LA	W 14–7	5,000	
October 12		Texas A&M*	Centenary Field; Shreveport, LA	W 7–6	8,500	
October 19		at Texas*	War Memorial Stadium; Austin, TX	L 13–19		
October 26		TCU*	Fairgrounds Stadium; Shreveport, LA	L 7–27	8,000	
November 1		at Loyola (LA)	Loyola Stadium; New Orleans, LA	W 9–0	8,500	
November 9		Tulsa*	Centenary Field; Shreveport, LA	W 22–0	5,000	
November 16		Baylor*^{†}	Centenary Field; Shreveport, LA	L 0–20	5,500	
November 23		at Ole Miss*	Municipal Stadium; Jackson, MS	L 0–6	4,000	
November 28		at Xavier*	Corcoran Field; Cincinnati, OH	L 0–12		
*Non-conference game; ^{†}Homecoming; All times are in Central time
