= 1935 Furman Purple Hurricane football team =

American college football season

1935 Furman Purple Hurricane football
- Conference: Southern Intercollegiate Athletic Association
- Record: 8–1 (4–0 SIAA)
- Head coach: Dizzy McLeod (4th season)
- Captain: Hubert Blair
- Home stadium: Manly Field

1935 Southern Intercollegiate Athletic Association football standings
	Conf.					Overall
Team	W		L		T	W		L		T
Middle Tennessee State Teachers $	5	–	0	–	0	8	–	0	–	0
Howard (AL)	5	–	0	–	1	7	–	1	–	2
Furman	4	–	0	–	0	8	–	1	–	0
Centenary	3	–	0	–	0	6	–	5	–	0
Union (KY)	2	–	0	–	2	3	–	1	–	2
Southwestern (TN)	2	–	0	–	2	3	–	4	–	3
Louisiana Tech	7	–	1	–	0	8	–	1	–	0
Mississippi State Teachers	5	–	1	–	0	6	–	4	–	0
Stetson	4	–	1	–	0	7	–	2	–	0
The Citadel	4	–	1	–	0	4	–	3	–	1
Transylvania	3	–	1	–	0	5	–	3	–	0
Georgetown (KY)	3	–	1	–	1	5	–	2	–	1
Western Kentucky State Teachers	5	–	2	–	0	7	–	3	–	0
Wofford	3	–	2	–	1	4	–	4	–	1
Louisiana College	4	–	4	–	0	6	–	4	–	0
Miami (FL)	1	–	1	–	0	5	–	3	–	0
Millsaps	2	–	2	–	1	4	–	4	–	2
Mercer	1	–	1	–	0	4	–	5	–	0
Centre	1	–	1	–	0	1	–	7	–	1
Union (TN)	2	–	3	–	1	6	–	4	–	1
Eastern Kentucky State Teachers	2	–	3	–	1	4	–	4	–	1
Murray State	2	–	4	–	0	4	–	5	–	0
Presbyterian	2	–	4	–	0	2	–	7	–	0
Rollins	1	–	3	–	0	2	–	5	–	0
Loyola (LA)	1	–	3	–	0	2	–	6	–	1
Newberry	1	–	4	–	0	2	–	8	–	0
SW Louisiana	1	–	4	–	0	2	–	8	–	0
Louisville	1	–	4	–	0	1	–	6	–	1
Louisiana Normal	1	–	5	–	0	2	–	9	–	0
West Tennessee State Teachers	0	–	3	–	1	1	–	6	–	1
Erskine	0	–	4	–	1	1	–	6	–	1
Mississippi College	0	–	5	–	1	2	–	6	–	1
Tennessee Tech	0	–	5	–	1	1	–	6	–	1
Morehead State	0	–	5	–	0	1	–	6	–	0
$ – Conference champion

The 1935 Furman Purple Hurricane football team represented Furman University as a member of the Southern Intercollegiate Athletic Association (SIAA) during the 1935 college football season. Led by fourth-year head coach Dizzy McLeod, the Purple Hurricane compiled an overall record of 8–1, with a mark of 4–0 in conference play, and finished third in the SIAA.

== Schedule ==
Date	Opponent	Site	Result	Attendance	Source
September 28	Piedmont*	Manly Field; Greenville, SC	W 69–0	3,000	
October 5	Presbyterian	Manly Field; Greenville, SC	W 23–0		
October 12	at Georgia*	Sanford Stadium; Athens, GA	L 7–31	10,000	
October 18	vs. Wake Forest*	Central High School Stadium; Charlotte, NC	W 9–0		
October 26	Mercer	Manly Field; Greenville, SC	W 32–0		
November 2	The Citadel	Manly Field; Greenville, SC (rivalry)	W 35–0	4,500	
November 9	Wofford	Manly Field; Greenville, SC (rivalry)	W 29–0		
November 16	at South Carolina*	Carolina Municipal Stadium; Columbia, SC	W 20–7	3,500	
November 28	Clemson*	Manly Field; Greenville, SC	W 8–6		
*Non-conference game
