= 1935 Middle Tennessee State Teachers Blue Raiders football team =

American college football season

1935 Middle Tennessee State Teachers Blue Raiders football

SIAA champion
- Conference: Southern Intercollegiate Athletic Association
- Record: 8–0 (5–0 SIAA)
- Head coach: Johnny Floyd (2nd season)
- Captain: Homer Pittard
- Home stadium: Horace Jones Field

1935 Southern Intercollegiate Athletic Association football standings
	Conf.					Overall
Team	W		L		T	W		L		T
Middle Tennessee State Teachers $	5	–	0	–	0	8	–	0	–	0
Howard (AL)	5	–	0	–	1	7	–	1	–	2
Furman	4	–	0	–	0	8	–	1	–	0
Centenary	3	–	0	–	0	6	–	5	–	0
Union (KY)	2	–	0	–	2	3	–	1	–	2
Southwestern (TN)	2	–	0	–	2	3	–	4	–	3
Louisiana Tech	7	–	1	–	0	8	–	1	–	0
Mississippi State Teachers	5	–	1	–	0	6	–	4	–	0
Stetson	4	–	1	–	0	7	–	2	–	0
The Citadel	4	–	1	–	0	4	–	3	–	1
Transylvania	3	–	1	–	0	5	–	3	–	0
Georgetown (KY)	3	–	1	–	1	5	–	2	–	1
Western Kentucky State Teachers	5	–	2	–	0	7	–	3	–	0
Wofford	3	–	2	–	1	4	–	4	–	1
Louisiana College	4	–	4	–	0	6	–	4	–	0
Miami (FL)	1	–	1	–	0	5	–	3	–	0
Millsaps	2	–	2	–	1	4	–	4	–	2
Mercer	1	–	1	–	0	4	–	5	–	0
Centre	1	–	1	–	0	1	–	7	–	1
Union (TN)	2	–	3	–	1	6	–	4	–	1
Eastern Kentucky State Teachers	2	–	3	–	1	4	–	4	–	1
Murray State	2	–	4	–	0	4	–	5	–	0
Presbyterian	2	–	4	–	0	2	–	7	–	0
Rollins	1	–	3	–	0	2	–	5	–	0
Loyola (LA)	1	–	3	–	0	2	–	6	–	1
Newberry	1	–	4	–	0	2	–	8	–	0
SW Louisiana	1	–	4	–	0	2	–	8	–	0
Louisville	1	–	4	–	0	1	–	6	–	1
Louisiana Normal	1	–	5	–	0	2	–	9	–	0
West Tennessee State Teachers	0	–	3	–	1	1	–	6	–	1
Erskine	0	–	4	–	1	1	–	6	–	1
Mississippi College	0	–	5	–	1	2	–	6	–	1
Tennessee Tech	0	–	5	–	1	1	–	6	–	1
Morehead State	0	–	5	–	0	1	–	6	–	0
$ – Conference champion

The 1935 Middle Tennessee State Teachers Blue Raiders football team was an American football team that represented Middle Tennessee State Teachers College (now known as Middle Tennessee State University) as a member of the Southern Intercollegiate Athletic Association during the 1935 college football season. In their second season under head coach Johnny Floyd, Middle Tennessee compiled a 8–0 record and finished as SIAA champion. The team's captain was Homer Pittard.

== Schedule ==
Date	Opponent	Site	Result	Source
September 27	Cumberland (TN)*	Horace Jones Field; Murfreesboro, TN	W 13–6	
October 4	Jacksonville State*	Horace Jones Field; Murfreesboro, TN	W 20–0	
October 11	at Union (TN)	Jackson, TN	W 7–0	
October 18	West Tennessee State Teachers	Horace Jones Field; Murfreesboro, TN	W 35–0	
October 25	Western Kentucky State Teachers	Horace Jones Field; Murfreesboro, TN (rivalry)	W 7–0	
November 9	at Murray State	Cutchin Stadium; Murray, KY	W 19–6	
November 16	Maryville (TN)*	Horace Jones Field; Murfreesboro, TN	W 20–7	
November 28	at Tennessee Tech	Overhill Field; Cookeville, TN	W 7–6	
*Non-conference game
