= 1935 Tennessee State Tigers football team =

American college football season

1935 Tennessee State Tigers football
- Conference: Independent
- Record: 4–3–1
- Head coach: Walter S. Davis (3rd season)
- Home stadium: State College field

1935 Southern college football independents records
| | Conf. | | | Overall |
| Team | W | L | T | W | | L | | T |
|---|---|---|---|---|---|---|---|---|
| Catholic University | | – | | 8 | – | 1 | – | 0 |
| William & Mary Norfolk | | – | | 8 | – | 1 | – | 0 |
| Texas Wesleyan | | – | | 8 | – | 2 | – | 1 |
| George Washington | | – | | 6 | – | 3 | – | 0 |
| Hardin–Simmons | | – | | 6 | – | 3 | – | 1 |
| Tennessee State | | – | | 4 | – | 3 | – | 1 |
| Navy | | – | | 5 | – | 4 | – | 0 |
| Western Maryland | | – | | 6 | – | 5 | – | 0 |
| East Carolina | | – | | 3 | – | 3 | – | 0 |
| Georgetown | | – | | 4 | – | 4 | – | 0 |
| Tampa | | – | | 5 | – | 5 | – | 0 |
| Troy State | | – | | 5 | – | 5 | – | 0 |
| South Georgia Teachers | | – | | 3 | – | 3 | – | 2 |
| West Virginia | | – | | 3 | – | 4 | – | 2 |
| Oklahoma City | | – | | 3 | – | 4 | – | 1 |
| Texas A&I | | – | | 3 | – | 5 | – | 0 |
| Delaware | | – | | 2 | – | 5 | – | 1 |
| Jacksonville State | | – | | 2 | – | 5 | – | 0 |
| Wake Forest | | – | | 2 | – | 7 | – | 0 |
| Oglethorpe | | – | | 1 | – | 8 | – | 0 |

The 1935 Tennessee State Tigers football team represented Tennessee Agricultural & Industrial State College—now known as Tennessee State University—as an independent during the 1935 college football season. Led by third-year head coach Walter S. Davis, the Tigers compiled a record of 4–3–1.

== Schedule ==
| Date | Time | Opponent | Site | Result | Attendance | Source |
|---|---|---|---|---|---|---|
| October 12 | | Alcorn A&M | Nashville, TN | W 26–0 | | |
| October 19 | 1:00 p.m. | at Clark (GA) | Clark University athletic field; Atlanta, GA | T 6–6 | | |
| October 26 | | Alabama A&M | Nashville, TN | W 25–0 | | |
| November 2 | | at Wilberforce | Wilberforce, OH | L 0–26 | | |
| November 9 | | Lane | Nashville, TN | W 40–6 | | |
| November 16 | | Louisville Municipal | State College field; Nashville, TN | W 13–0 | | |
| November 23 | | at West Virginia State | Institute, WV | L 0–33 | | |
| November 28 | 2:00 p.m. | Kentucky State^{†} | State College field; Nashville, TN | L 0–6 | 2,000 | |
^{†}Homecoming; All times are in Central time
