= 1935 Miami Hurricanes football team =

American college football season

1935 Miami Hurricanes football
- Conference: Southern Intercollegiate Athletic Association
- Record: 5–3 (1–1 SIAA)
- Head coach: Irl Tubbs (1st season)
- Home stadium: Miami Stadium

1935 Southern Intercollegiate Athletic Association football standings
	Conf.					Overall
Team	W		L		T	W		L		T
Middle Tennessee State Teachers $	5	–	0	–	0	8	–	0	–	0
Howard (AL)	5	–	0	–	1	7	–	1	–	2
Furman	4	–	0	–	0	8	–	1	–	0
Centenary	3	–	0	–	0	6	–	5	–	0
Union (KY)	2	–	0	–	2	3	–	1	–	2
Southwestern (TN)	2	–	0	–	2	3	–	4	–	3
Louisiana Tech	7	–	1	–	0	8	–	1	–	0
Mississippi State Teachers	5	–	1	–	0	6	–	4	–	0
Stetson	4	–	1	–	0	7	–	2	–	0
The Citadel	4	–	1	–	0	4	–	3	–	1
Transylvania	3	–	1	–	0	5	–	3	–	0
Georgetown (KY)	3	–	1	–	1	5	–	2	–	1
Western Kentucky State Teachers	5	–	2	–	0	7	–	3	–	0
Wofford	3	–	2	–	1	4	–	4	–	1
Louisiana College	4	–	4	–	0	6	–	4	–	0
Miami (FL)	1	–	1	–	0	5	–	3	–	0
Millsaps	2	–	2	–	1	4	–	4	–	2
Mercer	1	–	1	–	0	4	–	5	–	0
Centre	1	–	1	–	0	1	–	7	–	1
Union (TN)	2	–	3	–	1	6	–	4	–	1
Eastern Kentucky State Teachers	2	–	3	–	1	4	–	4	–	1
Murray State	2	–	4	–	0	4	–	5	–	0
Presbyterian	2	–	4	–	0	2	–	7	–	0
Rollins	1	–	3	–	0	2	–	5	–	0
Loyola (LA)	1	–	3	–	0	2	–	6	–	1
Newberry	1	–	4	–	0	2	–	8	–	0
SW Louisiana	1	–	4	–	0	2	–	8	–	0
Louisville	1	–	4	–	0	1	–	6	–	1
Louisiana Normal	1	–	5	–	0	2	–	9	–	0
West Tennessee State Teachers	0	–	3	–	1	1	–	6	–	1
Erskine	0	–	4	–	1	1	–	6	–	1
Mississippi College	0	–	5	–	1	2	–	6	–	1
Tennessee Tech	0	–	5	–	1	1	–	6	–	1
Morehead State	0	–	5	–	0	1	–	6	–	0
$ – Conference champion

The 1935 Miami Hurricanes football team represented the University of Miami as a member of the Southern Intercollegiate Athletic Association (SIAA) in the 1935 college football season. The Hurricanes played their home games at Miami Stadium in Miami, Florida. The team was coached by Irl Tubbs, in his first year as head coach for the Hurricanes.

== Schedule ==
Date	Time	Opponent	Site	Result	Attendance	Source
October 11		Southeastern Louisiana*	Miami Stadium; Miami, FL	W 2–0		
October 19		at Georgetown*	Griffith Stadium; Washington, DC	L 0–13		
October 25		Tampa*	Miami Stadium; Miami, FL	L 7–13	3,500	
November 1	8:00 p.m.	Stetson	Miami Stadium; Miami, FL	L 12–13	4,000	
November 15		Wake Forest*	Miami Stadium; Miami, FL	W 3–0	3,000–3,500	
November 22		Rollins	Miami Stadium; Miami, FL	W 29–0		
November 29		Boston University*	Miami Stadium; Miami, FL	W 17–0	4,000	
December 6		Oglethorpe*	Miami Stadium; Miami, FL	W 21–13	3,500	
*Non-conference game; All times are in Eastern time
