= 1935 Western Kentucky State Teachers Hilltoppers football team =

American college football season

1935 Western Kentucky State Teachers Hilltoppers football
- Conference: Southern Intercollegiate Athletic Association
- Record: 7–3 (5–2 SIAA)
- Head coach: Carl Anderson (3rd season)

1935 Southern Intercollegiate Athletic Association football standings
	Conf.					Overall
Team	W		L		T	W		L		T
Middle Tennessee State Teachers $	5	–	0	–	0	8	–	0	–	0
Howard (AL)	5	–	0	–	1	7	–	1	–	2
Furman	4	–	0	–	0	8	–	1	–	0
Centenary	3	–	0	–	0	6	–	5	–	0
Union (KY)	2	–	0	–	2	3	–	1	–	2
Southwestern (TN)	2	–	0	–	2	3	–	4	–	3
Louisiana Tech	7	–	1	–	0	8	–	1	–	0
Mississippi State Teachers	5	–	1	–	0	6	–	4	–	0
Stetson	4	–	1	–	0	7	–	2	–	0
The Citadel	4	–	1	–	0	4	–	3	–	1
Transylvania	3	–	1	–	0	5	–	3	–	0
Georgetown (KY)	3	–	1	–	1	5	–	2	–	1
Western Kentucky State Teachers	5	–	2	–	0	7	–	3	–	0
Wofford	3	–	2	–	1	4	–	4	–	1
Louisiana College	4	–	4	–	0	6	–	4	–	0
Miami (FL)	1	–	1	–	0	5	–	3	–	0
Millsaps	2	–	2	–	1	4	–	4	–	2
Mercer	1	–	1	–	0	4	–	5	–	0
Centre	1	–	1	–	0	1	–	7	–	1
Union (TN)	2	–	3	–	1	6	–	4	–	1
Eastern Kentucky State Teachers	2	–	3	–	1	4	–	4	–	1
Murray State	2	–	4	–	0	4	–	5	–	0
Presbyterian	2	–	4	–	0	2	–	7	–	0
Rollins	1	–	3	–	0	2	–	5	–	0
Loyola (LA)	1	–	3	–	0	2	–	6	–	1
Newberry	1	–	4	–	0	2	–	8	–	0
SW Louisiana	1	–	4	–	0	2	–	8	–	0
Louisville	1	–	4	–	0	1	–	6	–	1
Louisiana Normal	1	–	5	–	0	2	–	9	–	0
West Tennessee State Teachers	0	–	3	–	1	1	–	6	–	1
Erskine	0	–	4	–	1	1	–	6	–	1
Mississippi College	0	–	5	–	1	2	–	6	–	1
Tennessee Tech	0	–	5	–	1	1	–	6	–	1
Morehead State	0	–	5	–	0	1	–	6	–	0
$ – Conference champion

The 1935 Western Kentucky State Teachers Hilltoppers football team represented Western Kentucky State Teachers College (now known as Western Kentucky University) in the 1935 college football season. They were coached by Carl Anderson.

== Schedule ==
Date	Time	Opponent	Site	Result	Attendance	Source
September 28		Bethel (TN)*	Bowling Green, KY	W 36–0		
October 5		at Western State Teachers*	Western State Teachers College Field; Kalamazoo, MI	L 0–6		
October 11		at Tennessee Tech	Cookeville, TN	W 31–6		
October 19		Transylvania	Bowling Green, KY	W 35–0		
October 25		at Middle Tennessee State Teachers	Murfreesboro, TN (rivalry)	L 0–7		
November 2		Murray State	Bowling Green, KY (rivalry)	W 21–6		
November 16		Howard (AL)^{†}	Bowling Green, KY	L 0–19		
November 23		Eastern Kentucky	Bowling Green, KY (rivalry)	W 40–6		
November 28		Tampa*	Bowling Green, KY	W 18–0		
December 7	2:00 p.m.	at Centre	Farris Stadium; Danville, KY	W 13–7	1,500	
*Non-conference game; ^{†}Homecoming; All times are in Central time
