= Eddie Reed =

American lawyer and football coach (1901–1960)

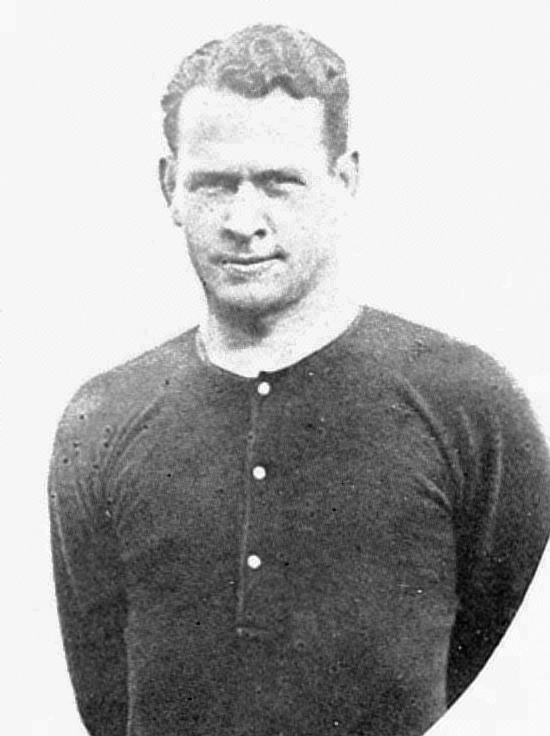
- Reed at Loyola in 1925

Biographical details
- Born: March 31, 1901
- Died: August 18, 1960 (aged 59); New Orleans, Louisiana, U.S.

Playing career
- 1919–1922: Tulane
- Position: Center

Coaching career (HC unless noted)
- 1923: Tulane (freshmen)
- 1925: Loyola (LA) (freshmen)
- 1926: Loyola (LA)
- 1927: Loyola (LA) (assistant)
- 1930: St. Aloysius (LA) (assistant)
- 1935–1936: Loyola (LA)

Head coaching record
- Overall: 16–12–1 (college)

James Edwin Reed (March 31, 1901 – August 18, 1960) was an American lawyer and college football coach. He served as the head coach at Loyola University New Orleans in 1926 and again from 1935 to 1936, compiling a record of 16–12–1.

== Early life ==
Reed attended Jesuit High School in New Orleans, Louisiana, where he played on the football team. For undergraduate studies, he attended Spring Hill College, where he continued playing the sport. Reed entered Tulane University Law School and played football under head coach Clark Shaughnessy as a center from 1919 to 1922. In 1921, he was named team captain, and the following season, Reed was selected to the All-Southern team.

== Coaching career ==
Upon graduation, Reed coached the freshman team at Tulane. In 1925, Loyola University of New Orleans hired him as an assistant coach under Moon Ducote. He was responsible for coaching the freshman team.

In the spring of 1926, Reed was promoted to head coach at Loyola, which Spalding's Official Foot Ball Guide estimated made him "perhaps the youngest university coach in America" at 25 years old. That year, he guided the Wolves to the only undefeated season, 10–0, in school history with the aid of the "Dixie Flyer", quarterback Elton "Bucky" Moore. Moore broke the national record held by Red Grange with 1,304 rushing yards, and also scored 14 touchdowns and 21 extra points. After the season, Clark Shaughnessy was hired as head coach, and Reed was retained as an assistant coach. In February 1928, his contract expired and he resigned from his post at Loyola. In 1930, Reed joined the coaching staff as an assistant of C. P. "Kip" Kessler at St. Aloysius College, a secondary school in New Orleans.

Reed returned to Loyola as its head football coach for the 1935 season. In 1936, the Wolves amassed a 4–6 record. In December, the Loyola administration announced that it would not renew Reed's contract as head coach, stating that it was "appreciative of the fine qualities and the sincere efforts of Mr. Reed ... [but] thought it advisable to make a change in its coaching staff for the coming season."

In his later life, Reed practiced law. He died of a heart attack on August 18, 1960, in New Orleans.

== Head coaching record ==
=== College ===
Year	Team	Overall	Conference	Standing	Bowl/playoffs
Loyola Wolf Pack (Independent) (1926)
1926	Loyola	10–0			
Loyola Wolf Pack (Dixie Conference / Southern Intercollegiate Athletic Association) (1935–1936)
1935	Loyola	2–6–1	2–2 / 1–3	T–4th / T–24th	
1936	Loyola	4–6	2–2 / 0–1	T–5th / 26th	
Loyola:		16–12–1	4–6		
Total:		16–12–1			
