= 1935 Louisiana Normal Demons football team =

American college football season

1935 Louisiana Normal Demons football
- Conference: Southern Intercollegiate Athletic Association
- Record: 2–9 (1–5 SIAA)
- Head coach: Harry Turpin (2nd season)
- Home stadium: Normal Field

1935 Southern Intercollegiate Athletic Association football standings
	Conf.					Overall
Team	W		L		T	W		L		T
Middle Tennessee State Teachers $	5	–	0	–	0	8	–	0	–	0
Howard (AL)	5	–	0	–	1	7	–	1	–	2
Furman	4	–	0	–	0	8	–	1	–	0
Centenary	3	–	0	–	0	6	–	5	–	0
Union (KY)	2	–	0	–	2	3	–	1	–	2
Southwestern (TN)	2	–	0	–	2	3	–	4	–	3
Louisiana Tech	7	–	1	–	0	8	–	1	–	0
Mississippi State Teachers	5	–	1	–	0	6	–	4	–	0
Stetson	4	–	1	–	0	7	–	2	–	0
The Citadel	4	–	1	–	0	4	–	3	–	1
Transylvania	3	–	1	–	0	5	–	3	–	0
Georgetown (KY)	3	–	1	–	1	5	–	2	–	1
Western Kentucky State Teachers	5	–	2	–	0	7	–	3	–	0
Wofford	3	–	2	–	1	4	–	4	–	1
Louisiana College	4	–	4	–	0	6	–	4	–	0
Miami (FL)	1	–	1	–	0	5	–	3	–	0
Millsaps	2	–	2	–	1	4	–	4	–	2
Mercer	1	–	1	–	0	4	–	5	–	0
Centre	1	–	1	–	0	1	–	7	–	1
Union (TN)	2	–	3	–	1	6	–	4	–	1
Eastern Kentucky State Teachers	2	–	3	–	1	4	–	4	–	1
Murray State	2	–	4	–	0	4	–	5	–	0
Presbyterian	2	–	4	–	0	2	–	7	–	0
Rollins	1	–	3	–	0	2	–	5	–	0
Loyola (LA)	1	–	3	–	0	2	–	6	–	1
Newberry	1	–	4	–	0	2	–	8	–	0
SW Louisiana	1	–	4	–	0	2	–	8	–	0
Louisville	1	–	4	–	0	1	–	6	–	1
Louisiana Normal	1	–	5	–	0	2	–	9	–	0
West Tennessee State Teachers	0	–	3	–	1	1	–	6	–	1
Erskine	0	–	4	–	1	1	–	6	–	1
Mississippi College	0	–	5	–	1	2	–	6	–	1
Tennessee Tech	0	–	5	–	1	1	–	6	–	1
Morehead State	0	–	5	–	0	1	–	6	–	0
$ – Conference champion

The 1935 Louisiana Normal Demons football team represented the Louisiana State Normal College—now known as Northwestern State University—as a member the Southern Intercollegiate Athletic Association (SIAA) during the 1935 college football season. Led by second-year head coach Harry Turpin, the Demons compiled an overall record of 2–9 with a mark of 1–5 in conference play.

== Schedule ==
Date	Time	Opponent	Site	Result	Attendance	Source
September 20		at Southeastern Louisiana*	Southeastern Stadium; Hammond, LA (rivalry)	L 13–19		
September 28	3:00 p.m.	at Centenary	Centenary Field; Shreveport, LA	L 0–21	3,500	
October 4		Lon Morris*	Normal Field; Natchitoches, LA	W 6–0	2,000	
October 12	8:00 p.m.	Louisiana College	Normal Field; Natchitoches, LA	L 6–12	3,000	
October 18	7:45 p.m.	at Mississippi State Teachers	Faulkner Field; Hattiesburg, MS	L 12–26		
October 26	2:30 p.m.	at Louisiana Tech	Tech Stadium; Ruston, LA (rivalry)	L 0–32	4,000	
November 1		at East Texas State*	Commerce, TX	L 0–7		
November 8		Stephen F. Austin*	Normal Field; Natchitoches, LA (rivalry)	L 6–13		
November 16	8:00 p.m.	at Louisiana College	Alumni Field; Pineville, LA	L 6–12		
November 23		at Tulane*	Tulane Stadium; New Orleans, LA	L 0–13	10,000	
November 28	2:30 p.m.	Southwestern Louisiana^{†}	Normal Field; Natchitoches, LA	W 6–0	4,000	
*Non-conference game; ^{†}Homecoming; All times are in Central time
