= 1935 Southwestern Louisiana Bulldogs football team =

American college football season

1935 Southwestern Louisiana Bulldogs football
- Conference: Southern Intercollegiate Athletic Association
- Record: 2–8 (1–4 SIAA)
- Head coach: Truman F. Wilbanks (5th season)
- Home stadium: Campus Athletic Field

1935 Southern Intercollegiate Athletic Association football standings
	Conf.					Overall
Team	W		L		T	W		L		T
Middle Tennessee State Teachers $	5	–	0	–	0	8	–	0	–	0
Howard (AL)	5	–	0	–	1	7	–	1	–	2
Furman	4	–	0	–	0	8	–	1	–	0
Centenary	3	–	0	–	0	6	–	5	–	0
Union (KY)	2	–	0	–	2	3	–	1	–	2
Southwestern (TN)	2	–	0	–	2	3	–	4	–	3
Louisiana Tech	7	–	1	–	0	8	–	1	–	0
Mississippi State Teachers	5	–	1	–	0	6	–	4	–	0
Stetson	4	–	1	–	0	7	–	2	–	0
The Citadel	4	–	1	–	0	4	–	3	–	1
Transylvania	3	–	1	–	0	5	–	3	–	0
Georgetown (KY)	3	–	1	–	1	5	–	2	–	1
Western Kentucky State Teachers	5	–	2	–	0	7	–	3	–	0
Wofford	3	–	2	–	1	4	–	4	–	1
Louisiana College	4	–	4	–	0	6	–	4	–	0
Miami (FL)	1	–	1	–	0	5	–	3	–	0
Millsaps	2	–	2	–	1	4	–	4	–	2
Mercer	1	–	1	–	0	4	–	5	–	0
Centre	1	–	1	–	0	1	–	7	–	1
Union (TN)	2	–	3	–	1	6	–	4	–	1
Eastern Kentucky State Teachers	2	–	3	–	1	4	–	4	–	1
Murray State	2	–	4	–	0	4	–	5	–	0
Presbyterian	2	–	4	–	0	2	–	7	–	0
Rollins	1	–	3	–	0	2	–	5	–	0
Loyola (LA)	1	–	3	–	0	2	–	6	–	1
Newberry	1	–	4	–	0	2	–	8	–	0
SW Louisiana	1	–	4	–	0	2	–	8	–	0
Louisville	1	–	4	–	0	1	–	6	–	1
Louisiana Normal	1	–	5	–	0	2	–	9	–	0
West Tennessee State Teachers	0	–	3	–	1	1	–	6	–	1
Erskine	0	–	4	–	1	1	–	6	–	1
Mississippi College	0	–	5	–	1	2	–	6	–	1
Tennessee Tech	0	–	5	–	1	1	–	6	–	1
Morehead State	0	–	5	–	0	1	–	6	–	0
$ – Conference champion

The 1935 Southwestern Louisiana Bulldogs football team was an American football team that represented the Southwestern Louisiana Institute of Liberal and Technical Learning (now known as the University of Louisiana at Lafayette) in the Southern Intercollegiate Athletic Association during the 1935 college football season. In their fifth year under head coach Truman F. Wilbanks, the team compiled a 2–8 record.

== Schedule ==
Date	Time	Opponent	Site	Result	Attendance	Source
September 27		at Stephen F. Austin*	Birdwell Field; Nacogdoches, TX	W 6–0		
October 4		Southeastern Louisiana*	Campus Athletic Field; Lafayette, LA (rivalry)	L 7–13		
October 11		at Louisiana Tech	Tech Stadium; Ruston, LA (rivalry)	L 0–25		
October 18		Spring Hill*	Campus Athletic Field; Lafayette, LA	L 7–20		
October 25		Millsaps	Campus Athletic Field; Lafayette, LA	L 3–19		
November 1		Louisiana College	Campus Athletic Field; Lafayette, LA	W 18–7		
November 8		Mississippi State Teachers	Lake Charles, LA	L 7–19		
November 15		at Sam Houston State*	Pritchett Field; Huntsville, TX	L 0–7		
November 23		at LSU*	Tiger Stadium; Baton Rouge, LA	L 0–56		
November 28	2:30 p.m.	at Louisiana Normal	Normal Field; Natchitoches, LA	L 0–6	4,000	
*Non-conference game; All times are in Central time
