= 1935 The Citadel Bulldogs football team =

American college football season

1935 The Citadel Bulldogs football
- Conference: Southern Intercollegiate Athletic Association
- Record: 4–3–1 (4–1 SIAA)
- Head coach: Tatum Gressette (4th season)
- Home stadium: Johnson Hagood Stadium

1935 Southern Intercollegiate Athletic Association football standings
	Conf.					Overall
Team	W		L		T	W		L		T
Middle Tennessee State Teachers $	5	–	0	–	0	8	–	0	–	0
Howard (AL)	5	–	0	–	1	7	–	1	–	2
Furman	4	–	0	–	0	8	–	1	–	0
Centenary	3	–	0	–	0	6	–	5	–	0
Union (KY)	2	–	0	–	2	3	–	1	–	2
Southwestern (TN)	2	–	0	–	2	3	–	4	–	3
Louisiana Tech	7	–	1	–	0	8	–	1	–	0
Mississippi State Teachers	5	–	1	–	0	6	–	4	–	0
Stetson	4	–	1	–	0	7	–	2	–	0
The Citadel	4	–	1	–	0	4	–	3	–	1
Transylvania	3	–	1	–	0	5	–	3	–	0
Georgetown (KY)	3	–	1	–	1	5	–	2	–	1
Western Kentucky State Teachers	5	–	2	–	0	7	–	3	–	0
Wofford	3	–	2	–	1	4	–	4	–	1
Louisiana College	4	–	4	–	0	6	–	4	–	0
Miami (FL)	1	–	1	–	0	5	–	3	–	0
Millsaps	2	–	2	–	1	4	–	4	–	2
Mercer	1	–	1	–	0	4	–	5	–	0
Centre	1	–	1	–	0	1	–	7	–	1
Union (TN)	2	–	3	–	1	6	–	4	–	1
Eastern Kentucky State Teachers	2	–	3	–	1	4	–	4	–	1
Murray State	2	–	4	–	0	4	–	5	–	0
Presbyterian	2	–	4	–	0	2	–	7	–	0
Rollins	1	–	3	–	0	2	–	5	–	0
Loyola (LA)	1	–	3	–	0	2	–	6	–	1
Newberry	1	–	4	–	0	2	–	8	–	0
SW Louisiana	1	–	4	–	0	2	–	8	–	0
Louisville	1	–	4	–	0	1	–	6	–	1
Louisiana Normal	1	–	5	–	0	2	–	9	–	0
West Tennessee State Teachers	0	–	3	–	1	1	–	6	–	1
Erskine	0	–	4	–	1	1	–	6	–	1
Mississippi College	0	–	5	–	1	2	–	6	–	1
Tennessee Tech	0	–	5	–	1	1	–	6	–	1
Morehead State	0	–	5	–	0	1	–	6	–	0
$ – Conference champion

The 1935 The Citadel Bulldogs football team represented The Citadel, The Military College of South Carolina in the 1935 college football season. Tatum Gressette served as head coach for the fourth season. The Bulldogs played as members of the Southern Intercollegiate Athletic Association and played home games at Johnson Hagood Stadium.

== Schedule ==
Date	Opponent	Site	Result	Attendance	Source
October 5	Erskine	Johnson Hagood Stadium; Charleston, SC	W 19–0	2,000	
October 12	Wofford	Johnson Hagood Stadium; Charleston, SC (rivalry)	W 20–7		
October 17	vs. South Carolina*	County Fairgrounds; Orangeburg, SC	L 0–25		
October 26	at Davidson*	Richardson Field; Davidson, NC	T 7–7		
November 2	at Furman	Manly Field; Greenville, SC (rivalry)	L 0–35		
November 9	Newberry	Johnson Hagood Stadium; Charleston, SC	W 20–0		
November 16	Clemson*	Johnson Hagood Stadium; Charleston, SC	L 0–6	3,000	
November 28	Presbyterian	Johnson Hagood Stadium; Charleston, SC	W 18–7		
*Non-conference game
