= 1935 Mississippi College Choctaws football team =

American college football season

1935 Mississippi College Choctaws football
- Conference: Dixie Conference, Southern Intercollegiate Athletic Association
- Record: 2–6–1 (1–4–1 Dixie, 0–5–1 SIAA)
- Head coach: Stanley L. Robinson (11th season)
- Home stadium: Provine Field; Municipal Stadium

1935 Dixie Conference football standings
| | Conf. | | | | | Overall |
| Team | W | | L | | T | W | | L | | T |
|---|---|---|---|---|---|---|---|---|---|---|
| Howard (AL) $ | 3 | – | 0 | – | 1 | 7 | – | 1 | – | 2 |
| Chattanooga | 3 | – | 1 | – | 1 | 4 | – | 3 | – | 1 |
| Spring Hill | 2 | – | 1 | – | 2 | 7 | – | 2 | – | 2 |
| Millsaps | 1 | – | 1 | – | 2 | 4 | – | 4 | – | 2 |
| Southwestern (TN) | 2 | – | 2 | – | 2 | 3 | – | 4 | – | 2 |
| Mercer | 1 | – | 1 | – | 0 | 4 | – | 5 | – | 0 |
| Loyola (LA) | 2 | – | 2 | – | 0 | 2 | – | 6 | – | 1 |
| Birmingham–Southern | 2 | – | 5 | – | 0 | 2 | – | 6 | – | 0 |
| Mississippi College | 1 | – | 4 | – | 1 | 2 | – | 6 | – | 1 |
| Centre | 0 | – | 0 | – | 1 | 1 | – | 7 | – | 1 |
$ – Conference champion

1935 Southern Intercollegiate Athletic Association football standings
| | Conf. | | | | | Overall |
| Team | W | | L | | T | W | | L | | T |
|---|---|---|---|---|---|---|---|---|---|---|
| Middle Tennessee State Teachers $ | 5 | – | 0 | – | 0 | 8 | – | 0 | – | 0 |
| Howard (AL) | 5 | – | 0 | – | 1 | 7 | – | 1 | – | 2 |
| Furman | 4 | – | 0 | – | 0 | 8 | – | 1 | – | 0 |
| Centenary | 3 | – | 0 | – | 0 | 6 | – | 5 | – | 0 |
| Union (KY) | 2 | – | 0 | – | 2 | 3 | – | 1 | – | 2 |
| Southwestern (TN) | 2 | – | 0 | – | 2 | 3 | – | 4 | – | 3 |
| Louisiana Tech | 7 | – | 1 | – | 0 | 8 | – | 1 | – | 0 |
| Mississippi State Teachers | 5 | – | 1 | – | 0 | 6 | – | 4 | – | 0 |
| Stetson | 4 | – | 1 | – | 0 | 7 | – | 2 | – | 0 |
| The Citadel | 4 | – | 1 | – | 0 | 4 | – | 3 | – | 1 |
| Transylvania | 3 | – | 1 | – | 0 | 5 | – | 3 | – | 0 |
| Georgetown (KY) | 3 | – | 1 | – | 1 | 5 | – | 2 | – | 1 |
| Western Kentucky State Teachers | 5 | – | 2 | – | 0 | 7 | – | 3 | – | 0 |
| Wofford | 3 | – | 2 | – | 1 | 4 | – | 4 | – | 1 |
| Louisiana College | 4 | – | 4 | – | 0 | 6 | – | 4 | – | 0 |
| Miami (FL) | 1 | – | 1 | – | 0 | 5 | – | 3 | – | 0 |
| Millsaps | 2 | – | 2 | – | 1 | 4 | – | 4 | – | 2 |
| Mercer | 1 | – | 1 | – | 0 | 4 | – | 5 | – | 0 |
| Centre | 1 | – | 1 | – | 0 | 1 | – | 7 | – | 1 |
| Union (TN) | 2 | – | 3 | – | 1 | 6 | – | 4 | – | 1 |
| Eastern Kentucky State Teachers | 2 | – | 3 | – | 1 | 4 | – | 4 | – | 1 |
| Murray State | 2 | – | 4 | – | 0 | 4 | – | 5 | – | 0 |
| Presbyterian | 2 | – | 4 | – | 0 | 2 | – | 7 | – | 0 |
| Rollins | 1 | – | 3 | – | 0 | 2 | – | 5 | – | 0 |
| Loyola (LA) | 1 | – | 3 | – | 0 | 2 | – | 6 | – | 1 |
| Newberry | 1 | – | 4 | – | 0 | 2 | – | 8 | – | 0 |
| SW Louisiana | 1 | – | 4 | – | 0 | 2 | – | 8 | – | 0 |
| Louisville | 1 | – | 4 | – | 0 | 1 | – | 6 | – | 1 |
| Louisiana Normal | 1 | – | 5 | – | 0 | 2 | – | 9 | – | 0 |
| West Tennessee State Teachers | 0 | – | 3 | – | 1 | 1 | – | 6 | – | 1 |
| Erskine | 0 | – | 4 | – | 1 | 1 | – | 6 | – | 1 |
| Mississippi College | 0 | – | 5 | – | 1 | 2 | – | 6 | – | 1 |
| Tennessee Tech | 0 | – | 5 | – | 1 | 1 | – | 6 | – | 1 |
| Morehead State | 0 | – | 5 | – | 0 | 1 | – | 6 | – | 0 |
$ – Conference champion

The 1935 Mississippi College Choctaws football team was an American football team that represented Mississippi College as a member of the Dixie Conference and the Southern Intercollegiate Athletic Association (SIAA) in the 1935 college football season. Led by Stanley L. Robinson in his eleventh season as head coach, the team compiled an overall record of 2–6–1 and with a mark of 1–4–1 in Dixie Conference play and 0–5–1 against SIAA competition.

== Schedule ==
| Date | Opponent | Site | Result | Source |
|---|---|---|---|---|
| September 28 | Louisiana College | Provine Field; Clinton, MS | L 0–7 | |
| October 5 | vs. Howard (AL) | Greer Field; Meridian, MS | L 0–46 | |
| October 11 | vs. Spring Hill | Gulfport Fair Grounds; Gulfport, MS | L 0–13 | |
| October 18 | Southwestern (TN) | Municipal Stadium; Jackson, MS | L 0–13 | |
| October 26 | vs. Delta State* | Greenwood, MS | W 34–0 | |
| November 1 | at Chattanooga | Chamberlain Field; Chattanooga, TN | W 12–7 | |
| November 8 | at Louisiana Tech | Tech Stadium; Ruston, LA | L 7–21 | |
| November 15 | at Loyola (LA) | Loyola Stadium; New Orleans, LA | L 0–37 | |
| November 28 | Millsaps | Municipal Stadium; Jackson, MS (rivalry) | T 0–0 | |
*Non-conference game
