= 1935 Birmingham–Southern Panthers football team =

American college football season

1935 Birmingham–Southern Panthers football
- Conference: Dixie Conference
- Record: 2–6 (2–5 Dixie)
- Head coach: Jenks Gillem (8th season)
- Home stadium: Legion Field

1935 Dixie Conference football standings
	Conf.					Overall
Team	W		L		T	W		L		T
Howard (AL) $	3	–	0	–	1	7	–	1	–	2
Chattanooga	3	–	1	–	1	4	–	3	–	1
Spring Hill	2	–	1	–	2	7	–	2	–	2
Millsaps	1	–	1	–	2	4	–	4	–	2
Southwestern (TN)	2	–	2	–	2	3	–	4	–	2
Mercer	1	–	1	–	0	4	–	5	–	0
Loyola (LA)	2	–	2	–	0	2	–	6	–	1
Birmingham–Southern	2	–	5	–	0	2	–	6	–	0
Mississippi College	1	–	4	–	1	2	–	6	–	1
Centre	0	–	0	–	1	1	–	7	–	1
$ – Conference champion

The 1935 Birmingham–Southern Panthers football team was an American football team that represented Birmingham–Southern College as a member of the Dixie Conference during the 1935 college football season. In their eighth season under head coach Jenks Gillem, the team compiled a 2–6 record.

== Schedule ==
Date	Opponent	Site	Result	Attendance	Source
September 27	at Auburn*	Cramton Bowl; Montgomery, AL	L 7–25	8,500	
October 4	at Loyola (LA)	Loyola University Stadium; New Orleans, LA	L 13–20		
October 11	at Mercer	Centennial Stadium; Macon, GA	L 0–14	3,000	
October 19	at Millsaps	Municipal Stadium; Jackson, MS	L 6–7		
October 26	at Chattanooga	Chamberlain Field; Chattanooga, TN	L 14–26	4,000	
November 9	Southwestern (TN)	Legion Field; Birmingham, AL	W 12–0	2,500	
November 15	at Spring Hill	Dorn Stadium; Mobile, AL	W 13–6		
November 28	vs. Howard (AL)	Legion Field; Birmingham, AL	L 0–7	17,000	
*Non-conference game
