= Doc Mathis =

American sports coach and administrator (1909–1986)

- Mathis pictured in Phi Psi Cli 1951, Elon yearbook

Biographical details
- Born: July 11, 1909; Wilkes County, North Carolina, U.S.
- Died: October 24, 1986 (aged 77); Burlington, North Carolina, U.S.

Playing career

Football
- 1929–1931: Davidson

Basketball
- 1929–1932: Davidson

Football
- 1930–1932: Davidson
- Positions: Guard (football); Forward (basketball); Outfielder (baseball)

Coaching career (HC unless noted)

Football
- 1934–1935: East Carolina

Basketball
- 1934–1936: East Carolina
- 1936–1937: Catawba
- 1949–1959: Elon

Baseball
- 1954–1956: Elon

Administrative career (AD unless noted)
- 1956: Elon

Head coaching record
- Overall: 4–7–1 (football); 184–150 (basketball); 46–19 (baseball)

Graham Lunsford "Doc" Mathis (July 11, 1909 – October 24, 1986) was an American football, basketball, and baseball coach and college athletics administrator. He was the head football coach at East Carolina Teachers College—now known as East Carolina University—from 1934 to 1935, compiling a record of 4–7–1. Mathis was also the head basketball coach at East Carolina from 1934 to 1936, Catawba College from 1936 to 1937, and Elon University from 1949 to 1959, amassing a career college basketball coaching record of 184–150. Mathis was also the head baseball coach at Elon from 1954 to 1956, tallying a mark of 46–19, and the school's athletic director in 1956.

== Head coaching record ==
=== Football ===
Year	Team	Overall	Conference	Standing	Bowl/playoffs
East Carolina Pirates (Independent) (1934–1935)
1934	East Carolina	1–4–1			
1935	East Carolina	3–3			
East Carolina:		4–7–1			
Total:		4–7–1			
