= 1935 Troy State Red Wave football team =

American college football season

1935 Troy State Red Wave football
- Conference: Independent
- Record: 5–5
- Head coach: Albert Elmore (5th season)
- Home stadium: Pace Field

1935 Southern college football independents records
	Conf.			Overall
Team	W	L	T	W		L		T
Catholic University		–		8	–	1	–	0
William & Mary Norfolk		–		8	–	1	–	0
Texas Wesleyan		–		8	–	2	–	1
George Washington		–		6	–	3	–	0
Hardin–Simmons		–		6	–	3	–	1
Tennessee State		–		4	–	3	–	1
Navy		–		5	–	4	–	0
Western Maryland		–		6	–	5	–	0
East Carolina		–		3	–	3	–	0
Georgetown		–		4	–	4	–	0
Tampa		–		5	–	5	–	0
Troy State		–		5	–	5	–	0
South Georgia Teachers		–		3	–	3	–	2
West Virginia		–		3	–	4	–	2
Oklahoma City		–		3	–	4	–	1
Texas A&I		–		3	–	5	–	0
Delaware		–		2	–	5	–	1
Jacksonville State		–		2	–	5	–	0
Wake Forest		–		2	–	7	–	0
Oglethorpe		–		1	–	8	–	0

The 1935 Troy State Red Wave football team represented Troy State Teachers College (now known as Troy University) as an independent during the 1935 college football season. Led by fifth-year head coach Albert Elmore, the Red Wave compiled an overall record of 5–5.

== Schedule ==
Date	Opponent	Site	Result	Attendance	Source
September 20	vs. Spring Hill	Cramton Bowl; Montgomery, AL	L 0–12	2,500	
October 4	Brewton–Parker	Pace Field; Troy, AL	W 43–7		
October 12	at Mississippi State Teachers	Faulkner Field; Hattiesburg, MS	W 14–13		
October 19	Middle Georgia	Pace Field; Troy, AL	W 44–6		
October 26	at South Georgia Teachers	Statesboro, GA	W 28–26		
November 1	Oglethorpe	Pace Field; Troy, AL	L 7–12		
November 8	at Howard (AL)	Legion Field; Birmingham, AL	L 0–52		
November 15	at Mercer	Centennial Stadium; Macon, GA	L 7–21		
November 22	at Tampa	Plant Field; Tampa, FL	L 7–9		
November 28	Cumberland (TN)	Pace Field; Troy, AL	W 20–13		
