= 1935 Mercer Bears football team =

American college football season

1935 Mercer Bears football
- Conference: Dixie Conference, Southern Intercollegiate Athletic Association
- Record: 4–5 (1–1 Dixie, 1–1 SIAA)
- Head coach: Lake Russell (7th season)
- Home stadium: Centennial Stadium

1935 Dixie Conference football standings
	Conf.					Overall
Team	W		L		T	W		L		T
Howard (AL) $	3	–	0	–	1	7	–	1	–	2
Chattanooga	3	–	1	–	1	4	–	3	–	1
Spring Hill	2	–	1	–	2	7	–	2	–	2
Millsaps	1	–	1	–	2	4	–	4	–	2
Southwestern (TN)	2	–	2	–	2	3	–	4	–	2
Mercer	1	–	1	–	0	4	–	5	–	0
Loyola (LA)	2	–	2	–	0	2	–	6	–	1
Birmingham–Southern	2	–	5	–	0	2	–	6	–	0
Mississippi College	1	–	4	–	1	2	–	6	–	1
Centre	0	–	0	–	1	1	–	7	–	1
$ – Conference champion

1935 Southern Intercollegiate Athletic Association football standings
	Conf.					Overall
Team	W		L		T	W		L		T
Middle Tennessee State Teachers $	5	–	0	–	0	8	–	0	–	0
Howard (AL)	5	–	0	–	1	7	–	1	–	2
Furman	4	–	0	–	0	8	–	1	–	0
Centenary	3	–	0	–	0	6	–	5	–	0
Union (KY)	2	–	0	–	2	3	–	1	–	2
Southwestern (TN)	2	–	0	–	2	3	–	4	–	3
Louisiana Tech	7	–	1	–	0	8	–	1	–	0
Mississippi State Teachers	5	–	1	–	0	6	–	4	–	0
Stetson	4	–	1	–	0	7	–	2	–	0
The Citadel	4	–	1	–	0	4	–	3	–	1
Transylvania	3	–	1	–	0	5	–	3	–	0
Georgetown (KY)	3	–	1	–	1	5	–	2	–	1
Western Kentucky State Teachers	5	–	2	–	0	7	–	3	–	0
Wofford	3	–	2	–	1	4	–	4	–	1
Louisiana College	4	–	4	–	0	6	–	4	–	0
Miami (FL)	1	–	1	–	0	5	–	3	–	0
Millsaps	2	–	2	–	1	4	–	4	–	2
Mercer	1	–	1	–	0	4	–	5	–	0
Centre	1	–	1	–	0	1	–	7	–	1
Union (TN)	2	–	3	–	1	6	–	4	–	1
Eastern Kentucky State Teachers	2	–	3	–	1	4	–	4	–	1
Murray State	2	–	4	–	0	4	–	5	–	0
Presbyterian	2	–	4	–	0	2	–	7	–	0
Rollins	1	–	3	–	0	2	–	5	–	0
Loyola (LA)	1	–	3	–	0	2	–	6	–	1
Newberry	1	–	4	–	0	2	–	8	–	0
SW Louisiana	1	–	4	–	0	2	–	8	–	0
Louisville	1	–	4	–	0	1	–	6	–	1
Louisiana Normal	1	–	5	–	0	2	–	9	–	0
West Tennessee State Teachers	0	–	3	–	1	1	–	6	–	1
Erskine	0	–	4	–	1	1	–	6	–	1
Mississippi College	0	–	5	–	1	2	–	6	–	1
Tennessee Tech	0	–	5	–	1	1	–	6	–	1
Morehead State	0	–	5	–	0	1	–	6	–	0
$ – Conference champion

The 1935 Mercer Bears football team was an American football team that represented Mercer University as a member of both the Dixie Conference and the Southern Intercollegiate Athletic Association (SIAA), during the 1935 college football season. In their seventh year under head coach Lake Russell, the team compiled a 4–5 record.

== Schedule ==
Date	Opponent	Site	Result	Attendance	Source
September 28	at Georgia*	Sanford Stadium; Athens, GA	L 0–31		
October 5	at Navy*	Thompson Stadium; Annapolis, MD	L 0–27	8,130	
October 11	Birmingham–Southern	Centennial Stadium; Macon, GA	W 14–0	3,000	
October 19	Presbyterian	Centennial Stadium; Macon, GA	W 14–7		
October 26	at Furman	Manly Field; Greenville, SC	L 0–32		
November 2	vs. Clemson*	Augusta, GA	L 0–13	3,000	
November 9	at Chattanooga	Chamberlain Field; Chattanooga, TN	L 7–12	2,200	
November 15	Troy State*	Centennial Stadium; Macon, GA	W 21–7		
November 28	Oglethorpe*	Centennial Stadium; Macon, GA	W 19–0		
*Non-conference game
