= 1935 Spring Hill Badgers football team =

American college football season

1935 Spring Hill Badgers football
- Conference: Dixie Conference
- Record: 7–2–2 (2–1–2 Dixie)
- Head coach: William T. Daly (7th season)

1935 Dixie Conference football standings
	Conf.					Overall
Team	W		L		T	W		L		T
Howard (AL) $	3	–	0	–	1	7	–	1	–	2
Chattanooga	3	–	1	–	1	4	–	3	–	1
Spring Hill	2	–	1	–	2	7	–	2	–	2
Millsaps	1	–	1	–	2	4	–	4	–	2
Southwestern (TN)	2	–	2	–	2	3	–	4	–	2
Mercer	1	–	1	–	0	4	–	5	–	0
Loyola (LA)	2	–	2	–	0	2	–	6	–	1
Birmingham–Southern	2	–	5	–	0	2	–	6	–	0
Mississippi College	1	–	4	–	1	2	–	6	–	1
Centre	0	–	0	–	1	1	–	7	–	1
$ – Conference champion

The 1935 Spring Hill Badgers football team was an American football team that represented Spring Hill College as a member of the Dixie Conference during the 1935 college football season. In their seventh year under head coach William T. Daly, the team compiled a 7–2–2 record.

== Schedule ==
Date	Opponent	Site	Result	Attendance	Source
September 20	vs. Troy State*	Cramton Bowl; Montgomery, AL	W 12–0	2,500	
September 27	at Loyola (LA)	Loyola University Stadium; New Orleans, LA	W 12–6		
October 5	at Murray State*	College Stadium; Murray, KY	W 33–0		
October 11	vs. Mississippi College	Gulfport Fair Grounds; Gulfport, MS	W 13–0		
October 18	at Southwestern Louisiana*	Campus Athletic Field; Lafayette, LA	W 20–7		
October 25	Union (TN)*	Dorn Stadium; Mobile, AL	L 0–6		
November 1	Mississippi State Teachers*	Dorn Stadium; Mobile, AL	W 19–0		
November 8	at Millsaps	Jackson, MS	T 0–0		
November 15	Birmingham–Southern	Dorn Stadium; Mobile, AL	L 6–13		
November 22	Jacksonville State*	Dorn Stadium; Mobile, AL	W 25–6		
November 28	Southwestern (TN)	Dorn Stadium; Mobile, AL	T 14–14		
*Non-conference game
