= 1935 Chattanooga Moccasins football team =

American college football season

1935 Chattanooga Moccasins football
- Conference: Dixie Conference
- Record: 4–3–1 (3–1–1 Dixie)
- Head coach: Scrappy Moore (5th season)
- Captain: Fred Ring
- Home stadium: Chamberlain Field

1935 Dixie Conference football standings
	Conf.					Overall
Team	W		L		T	W		L		T
Howard (AL) $	3	–	0	–	1	7	–	1	–	2
Chattanooga	3	–	1	–	1	4	–	3	–	1
Spring Hill	2	–	1	–	2	7	–	2	–	2
Millsaps	1	–	1	–	2	4	–	4	–	2
Southwestern (TN)	2	–	2	–	2	3	–	4	–	2
Mercer	1	–	1	–	0	4	–	5	–	0
Loyola (LA)	2	–	2	–	0	2	–	6	–	1
Birmingham–Southern	2	–	5	–	0	2	–	6	–	0
Mississippi College	1	–	4	–	1	2	–	6	–	1
Centre	0	–	0	–	1	1	–	7	–	1
$ – Conference champion

The 1935 Chattanooga Moccasins football team was an American football team that represented the University of Chattanooga (now known as the University of Tennessee at Chattanooga) in the Dixie Conference during the 1935 college football season. In its fifth year under head coach Scrappy Moore, the team compiled a 4–3–1 record.

== Schedule ==
Date	Time	Opponent	Site	Result	Attendance	Source
October 5		Georgia*	Chamberlain Field; Chattanooga, TN	L 0–40	2,000	
October 12		at Emory and Henry*	Emory, VA	L 0–25		
October 18		Oglethorpe*	Chamberlain Field; Chattanooga, TN	W 24–13		
October 26		Birmingham–Southern	Chamberlain Field; Chattanooga, TN	W 26–14	4,000	
November 1		Mississippi College	Chamberlain Field; Chattanooga, TN	L 7–12		
November 9		Mercer	Chamberlain Field; Chattanooga, TN	W 12–7	2,200	
November 16		at Southwestern (TN)	Faragason Field; Memphis, TN	W 12–0		
November 28	2:00 p.m.	Centre	Chamberlain Field; Chattanooga, TN	T 7–7	2,500	
*Non-conference game; All times are in Central time
