= 1935 Arkansas State Indians football team =

American college football season

1935 Arkansas State Indians football
- Conference: Arkansas Intercollegiate Conference
- Record: 2–7 (0–4 AIC)
- Head coach: Tommy Mills (2nd season)
- Home stadium: Kays Field

The 1935 Arkansas State Indians football team represented Arkansas State College—now known as Arkansas State University—as a member of the Arkansas Intercollegiate Conference (AIC) during the 1935 college football season. Led by second-year head coach Tommy Mills, the Indians compiled an overall record of 2–7 with a mark of 0–4 in conference play.

== Schedule ==
Date	Opponent	Site	Result	Attendance	Source
September 20	at Southwestern (TN)*	Hodges Field; Memphis, TN	L 0–38		
September 28	at Southern Illinois*	Carbondale, IL	W 7–0		
October 4	West Tennessee State Teachers*	Kays Field; Jonesboro, AR (rivalry)	W 18–0		
October 11	Tennessee Junior College*	Kays Field; Jonesboro, AR	L 0–25		
October 18	Hendrix	Kays Field; Jonesboro, AR	L 0–27		
October 25	at Saint Louis*	Walsh Memorial Stadium; St. Louis, MO	L 7–46	5,500	
November 1	at Arkansas A&M	Monticello, AR	L 0–28		
November 9	Arkansas State Teachers	Kays Field; Jonesboro, AR	L 0–27		
November 15	Magnolia A&M	Kays Field; Jonesboro, AR	L 6–7		
*Non-conference game
