= 1935 Howard Bulldogs football team =

American college football season

1935 Howard Bulldogs football

Dixie champion
- Conference: Dixie Conference, Southern Intercollegiate Athletic Association
- Record: 7–1–2 (3–0–1 Dixie, 5–0–1 SIAA)
- Head coach: Billy Bancroft (1st season)
- Home stadium: Legion Field

1935 Dixie Conference football standings
	Conf.					Overall
Team	W		L		T	W		L		T
Howard (AL) $	3	–	0	–	1	7	–	1	–	2
Chattanooga	3	–	1	–	1	4	–	3	–	1
Spring Hill	2	–	1	–	2	7	–	2	–	2
Millsaps	1	–	1	–	2	4	–	4	–	2
Southwestern (TN)	2	–	2	–	2	3	–	4	–	2
Mercer	1	–	1	–	0	4	–	5	–	0
Loyola (LA)	2	–	2	–	0	2	–	6	–	1
Birmingham–Southern	2	–	5	–	0	2	–	6	–	0
Mississippi College	1	–	4	–	1	2	–	6	–	1
Centre	0	–	0	–	1	1	–	7	–	1
$ – Conference champion

1935 Southern Intercollegiate Athletic Association football standings
	Conf.					Overall
Team	W		L		T	W		L		T
Middle Tennessee State Teachers $	5	–	0	–	0	8	–	0	–	0
Howard (AL)	5	–	0	–	1	7	–	1	–	2
Furman	4	–	0	–	0	8	–	1	–	0
Centenary	3	–	0	–	0	6	–	5	–	0
Union (KY)	2	–	0	–	2	3	–	1	–	2
Southwestern (TN)	2	–	0	–	2	3	–	4	–	3
Louisiana Tech	7	–	1	–	0	8	–	1	–	0
Mississippi State Teachers	5	–	1	–	0	6	–	4	–	0
Stetson	4	–	1	–	0	7	–	2	–	0
The Citadel	4	–	1	–	0	4	–	3	–	1
Transylvania	3	–	1	–	0	5	–	3	–	0
Georgetown (KY)	3	–	1	–	1	5	–	2	–	1
Western Kentucky State Teachers	5	–	2	–	0	7	–	3	–	0
Wofford	3	–	2	–	1	4	–	4	–	1
Louisiana College	4	–	4	–	0	6	–	4	–	0
Miami (FL)	1	–	1	–	0	5	–	3	–	0
Millsaps	2	–	2	–	1	4	–	4	–	2
Mercer	1	–	1	–	0	4	–	5	–	0
Centre	1	–	1	–	0	1	–	7	–	1
Union (TN)	2	–	3	–	1	6	–	4	–	1
Eastern Kentucky State Teachers	2	–	3	–	1	4	–	4	–	1
Murray State	2	–	4	–	0	4	–	5	–	0
Presbyterian	2	–	4	–	0	2	–	7	–	0
Rollins	1	–	3	–	0	2	–	5	–	0
Loyola (LA)	1	–	3	–	0	2	–	6	–	1
Newberry	1	–	4	–	0	2	–	8	–	0
SW Louisiana	1	–	4	–	0	2	–	8	–	0
Louisville	1	–	4	–	0	1	–	6	–	1
Louisiana Normal	1	–	5	–	0	2	–	9	–	0
West Tennessee State Teachers	0	–	3	–	1	1	–	6	–	1
Erskine	0	–	4	–	1	1	–	6	–	1
Mississippi College	0	–	5	–	1	2	–	6	–	1
Tennessee Tech	0	–	5	–	1	1	–	6	–	1
Morehead State	0	–	5	–	0	1	–	6	–	0
$ – Conference champion

The 1935 Howard Bulldogs football team represented Howard College—now known as the Samford University—as a member of the Dixie Conference and the Southern Intercollegiate Athletic Association (SIAA) during the 1935 college football season. In first second year under head coach Billy Bancroft, the Bulldogs compiled an overall record of 7–1–2 with mark of 3–0–1 in Dixie Conference play, winning the conference title. Howard was 5–0–1 against SIAA opponents.

== Schedule ==
Date	Opponent	Site	Result	Attendance	Source
September 20	at Mississippi State*	Scott Field; Starkville, MS	L 6–19	5,000	
September 28	at Alabama*	Denny Stadium; Tuscaloosa, AL	T 7–7	4,500–8,000	
October 5	vs. Mississippi College	Greer Field; Meridian, MS	W 46–0		
October 11	at Loyola (LA)	Loyola University Stadium; New Orleans, LA	W 21–0		
October 18	vs. Stetson	Wiregrass Stadium; Dothan, AL	W 32–0	3,000	
October 26	at Murray State	College Stadium; Murray, KY	W 13–0		
November 2	at Southwestern (TN)	Fargason Field; Memphis, TN	T 7–7	2,500	
November 8	Troy State*	Legion Field; Birmingham, AL	W 52–0		
November 16	at Western Kentucky State Teachers	Bowling Green, KY	W 19–0		
November 28	vs. Birmingham–Southern	Legion Field; Birmingham, AL	W 7–0	17,000	
*Non-conference game
