= 1935 Southern Illinois Maroons football team =

American college football season

1935 Southern Illinois Maroons football
- Conference: Illinois Intercollegiate Athletic Conference
- Record: 1–7–1 (1–4–1 IIAC)
- Head coach: William McAndrew (19th season)

1935 Illinois Intercollegiate Athletic Conference football standings
	Conf.					Overall
Team	W		L		T	W		L		T
Millikin +	4	–	0	–	0	5	–	1	–	0
Monmouth (IL) +	4	–	0	–	0	6	–	3	–	0
Northern Illinois State	5	–	1	–	1	7	–	1	–	1
Illinois College	5	–	1	–	0	5	–	3	–	0
McKendree	4	–	1	–	1	5	–	3	–	1
Illinois Wesleyan	4	–	1	–	0	7	–	3	–	0
Illinois State Normal	4	–	2	–	1	5	–	2	–	2
Elmhurst	2	–	1	–	1	5	–	2	–	1
Knox (IL)	2	–	1	–	1	5	–	2	–	2
Augustana (IL)	3	–	2	–	0	5	–	3	–	0
North Central	3	–	3	–	0	4	–	3	–	0
Carthage	2	–	3	–	0	4	–	4	–	0
Wheaton (IL)	1	–	2	–	1	2	–	5	–	1
St. Viator	1	–	2	–	0	2	–	4	–	2
Southern Illinois	1	–	4	–	1	1	–	7	–	1
Bradley	1	–	5	–	1	1	–	6	–	1
Western Illinois	1	–	6	–	0	2	–	6	–	0
Lake Forest	0	–	1	–	0	3	–	4	–	0
Eastern Illinois	0	–	5	–	0	1	–	7	–	0
Eureka	0	–	6	–	0	0	–	6	–	0
+ – Conference co-champions

The 1935 Southern Illinois Maroons football team was an American football team that represented Southern Illinois Normal University (now known as Southern Illinois University Carbondale) in the Illinois Intercollegiate Athletic Conference (IIAC) during the 1935 college football season. In its 19th season under head coach William McAndrew, the team compiled a 1–7–1 record (1–4–1 against conference opponents) and finished in 15th place out of 20 teams in the IIAC.

== Schedule ==
Date	Opponent	Site	Result	Source
September 28	Arkansas State*	Carbondale, IL	L 0–7	
October 4	Cape Girardeau*	Carbondale, IL	L 0–7	
October 12	at Illinois State Normal	McCormick Field; Normal, IL	L 0–13	
October 19	at St. Viator	Bourbonnais, IL	L 7–20	
October 26	Northern Illinois State	Carbondale, IL	L 0–28	
November 2	at McKendree	Lebanon, IL	T 12–12	
November 8	at Cape Girardeau	Houck Stadium; Cape Girardeau, MO	L 0–14	
November 16	at Eastern Illinois	Schahrer Field; Charleston, IL	W 13–9	
November 23	Illinois Wesleyan	Carbondale, IL	L 0–20	
*Non-conference game
