= Robert Erskine (coach) =

American football and basketball coach

Biographical details
- Born: July 4, 1904; Waukegan, Illinois, U.S.
- Died: February 1, 1978 (aged 73); San Mateo, California, U.S.

Coaching career (HC unless noted)

Football
- 1926–1932: Jesuit HS (LA)
- 1933–1934: Loyola (LA)
- 1935–1940: Oklahoma (assistant)
- 1941: Marquette ([backs)
- 1946–1947: Marquette (ends)
- 1948–1951: Marquette (backs)
- 1952–1954: Marquette (ends)
- 1955–1956: LSU (assistant)

Basketball
- 1924–1925: Loyola (LA)
- 1933–1939: Loyola (LA)

Head coaching record
- Overall: 11–7 (college football); 48–61 (college basketball)

Robert Horace "Doc" Erskine (July 4, 1904 – February 1, 1978) was an American college football and basketball coach. He served at Loyola University New Orleans as the head football coach from 1933 to 1934 and as the head basketball coach from 1924 to 1925 and 1933 to 1939.

== Biography ==
"Doc" was born on the Fourth of July in Waukegan, Illinois, to Caroline V. Griffith (1870–1952) & Robert James Erskine (1878–1925). He had an elder brother, David G. Erskine.

Erskine served as a lieutenant of infantry in the United States Army Reserve. He never played football at any level, but was described by the Associated Press as a capable analyst of blocking, running, passing, and punting.

He served as coach and trainer at the New Mexico Military Institute and Louisiana State University before being named basketball coach at Loyola University at New Orleans in 1924 while still a student. He received a B.S. from Loyola in 1926.

From 1926 to 1933, he coached at Jesuit High School in New Orleans, where he led the football team to a "brilliant record" of 46–8–3. After a year as assistant, he was head coach from 1927 through 1932. “During his six-year tenure as head coach, Erskine won four Prep championships,” wrote Ronald J. Drez in Gallant Fighting Sons. “Those six powerhouse football teams amassed 1,585 points to the opponents’ 362. His basketball teams won five consecutive Prep championships from 1929 to 1933. And his track teams collected four Prep trophies....Even Erskine’s golf teams won two Prep championships. In Doc’s six years, Jesuit athletics had exploded.” One of his athletes was 1932 Olympic Gold Medalist Emmett Toppino and Doc’s 1933 half-mile relay squad finished second in a national invitational in Chicago only to a team anchored by Jesse Owens.

In March 1933, Loyola University New Orleans appointed Erskine as its head football coach, replacing Clark Shaughnessy. As head football coach at Loyola from 1933 to 1934, Erskine's team amassed an 11–7 record. He resigned on December 19, 1934. In his seven years as Loyola basketball coach in 1924–25 and from 1933 to 1939, Erskine compiled a combined record of 48–61.

In 1935, he was hired as the backfield assistant at Oklahoma under Biff Jones. In 1938, Sooners fans recognized his hard work as a scout, naming him the "travelingest coach". In that role, he logged over 15,000 miles, including a 4,400-mile outing to Seattle (via Chicago) in preparation for a game against Washington State. In 1940, Erskine was shifted from freshman coach to once again handle backfield duties.

Erskine followed Tom Stidham to Marquette University, where he served as backfield coach for the 1941 season. He intended to remain at the school the following year, but he received military orders to report for duty in the United States Army Air Corps at Lowry Field as a first lieutenant in July. In September 1943, he was serving in the Air Corps Intelligence Division and was promoted to the rank of captain and discharged as a major. He returned from the service to Marquette in March 1946, and worked as the ends coach under head coach Frank Murray. He was shifted to backfield coach for the 1948 season, and by 1952, had been switched again. Erskine also handled scouting duties for the program.

== Head coaching record ==
=== College football ===
Year	Team	Overall	Conference	Standing
Loyola Wolf Pack (Southern Intercollegiate Athletic Association) (1933–1934)
1933	Loyola	7–2	3–1	T–8th
1934	Loyola	4–5	3–1	T–8th
Loyola:		11–7	6–2	
Total:		11–7		

=== College basketball ===
Record table
Season	Team	Overall	Conference	Standing	Postseason
Loyola Wolf Pack () (1924–1925)
1924–25	Loyola	0–5			
Loyola Wolf Pack () (1933–1939)
1933–34	Loyola	7–10			
1934–35	Loyola	11–2			
1935–36	Loyola	11–8			
1936–37	Loyola	8–12			
1937–38	Loyola	8–12			
1938–39	Loyola	3–12			
Loyola:		48–61 (.440)			
Total:		48–61 (.440)			
National champion Postseason invitational champion Conference regular season champion Conference regular season and conference tournament champion Division regular season champion Division regular season and conference tournament champion Conference tournament champion
