= 1935 Northern Illinois State Evansmen football team =

American college football season

1935 Northern Illinois State Evansmen football
- Conference: Illinois Intercollegiate Athletic Conference
- Record: 7–1–1 (5–1–1 IIAC)
- Head coach: Chick Evans (7th season)
- Captains: Reino Nori; William Howard
- Home stadium: Glidden Field

1935 Illinois Intercollegiate Athletic Conference football standings
	Conf.					Overall
Team	W		L		T	W		L		T
Millikin +	4	–	0	–	0	5	–	1	–	0
Monmouth (IL) +	4	–	0	–	0	6	–	3	–	0
Northern Illinois State	5	–	1	–	1	7	–	1	–	1
Illinois College	5	–	1	–	0	5	–	3	–	0
McKendree	4	–	1	–	1	5	–	3	–	1
Illinois Wesleyan	4	–	1	–	0	7	–	3	–	0
Illinois State Normal	4	–	2	–	1	5	–	2	–	2
Elmhurst	2	–	1	–	1	5	–	2	–	1
Knox (IL)	2	–	1	–	1	5	–	2	–	2
Augustana (IL)	3	–	2	–	0	5	–	3	–	0
North Central	3	–	3	–	0	4	–	3	–	0
Carthage	2	–	3	–	0	4	–	4	–	0
Wheaton (IL)	1	–	2	–	1	2	–	5	–	1
St. Viator	1	–	2	–	0	2	–	4	–	2
Southern Illinois	1	–	4	–	1	1	–	7	–	1
Bradley	1	–	5	–	1	1	–	6	–	1
Western Illinois	1	–	6	–	0	2	–	6	–	0
Lake Forest	0	–	1	–	0	3	–	4	–	0
Eastern Illinois	0	–	5	–	0	1	–	7	–	0
Eureka	0	–	6	–	0	0	–	6	–	0
+ – Conference co-champions

The 1935 Northern Illinois State Evansmen football team represented Northern Illinois State Teachers College—now known as Northern Illinois University—as a member of the Illinois Intercollegiate Athletic Conference (IIAC) during the 1935 college football season. Led by seventh-year head coach Chick Evans, the Evansmen compiled an overall record of 7–1–1 with a mark of 5–1–1 in conference play, tying for third place in the IIAC. The team played home games at the 5,500-seat Glidden Field, located on the east end of campus, in DeKalb, Illinois.

== Schedule ==
Date	Time	Opponent	Site	Result	Source
September 28		at Whitewater State*	Whitewater, WI	W 27–0	
October 5		at Illinois State	Normal, IL	T 0–0	
October 12		St. Viator	Glidden Field; DeKalb, IL	W 27-0	
October 19		Wilbur Wright JC*	Glidden Field; DeKalb, IL	W 34–0	
October 26		at Southern Illinois	Carbondale, IL	W 28–0	
November 1	2:15 p.m.	Wheaton (IL)	Glidden Field; DeKalb, IL	W 20–13	
November 9		at Illinois Wesleyan	Bloomington, IL	L 0–7	
November 16		Eureka	Glidden Field; DeKalb, IL	W 19–0	
November 23		at Eastern Illinois	Glidden Field; DeKalb, IL	W 49–0	
*Non-conference game; All times are in Central time
