= 1935 Centre Colonels football team =

American college football season

1935 Centre Colonels football
- Conference: Dixie Conference, Southern Intercollegiate Athletic Association
- Record: 1–7–1 (0–0–1 Dixie, 1–1 SIAA)
- Head coach: Ed Kubale (7th season)
- Home stadium: Farris Stadium

1935 Dixie Conference football standings
	Conf.					Overall
Team	W		L		T	W		L		T
Howard (AL) $	3	–	0	–	1	7	–	1	–	2
Chattanooga	3	–	1	–	1	4	–	3	–	1
Spring Hill	2	–	1	–	2	7	–	2	–	2
Millsaps	1	–	1	–	2	4	–	4	–	2
Southwestern (TN)	2	–	2	–	2	3	–	4	–	2
Mercer	1	–	1	–	0	4	–	5	–	0
Loyola (LA)	2	–	2	–	0	2	–	6	–	1
Birmingham–Southern	2	–	5	–	0	2	–	6	–	0
Mississippi College	1	–	4	–	1	2	–	6	–	1
Centre	0	–	0	–	1	1	–	7	–	1
$ – Conference champion

1935 Southern Intercollegiate Athletic Association football standings
	Conf.					Overall
Team	W		L		T	W		L		T
Middle Tennessee State Teachers $	5	–	0	–	0	8	–	0	–	0
Howard (AL)	5	–	0	–	1	7	–	1	–	2
Furman	4	–	0	–	0	8	–	1	–	0
Centenary	3	–	0	–	0	6	–	5	–	0
Union (KY)	2	–	0	–	2	3	–	1	–	2
Southwestern (TN)	2	–	0	–	2	3	–	4	–	3
Louisiana Tech	7	–	1	–	0	8	–	1	–	0
Mississippi State Teachers	5	–	1	–	0	6	–	4	–	0
Stetson	4	–	1	–	0	7	–	2	–	0
The Citadel	4	–	1	–	0	4	–	3	–	1
Transylvania	3	–	1	–	0	5	–	3	–	0
Georgetown (KY)	3	–	1	–	1	5	–	2	–	1
Western Kentucky State Teachers	5	–	2	–	0	7	–	3	–	0
Wofford	3	–	2	–	1	4	–	4	–	1
Louisiana College	4	–	4	–	0	6	–	4	–	0
Miami (FL)	1	–	1	–	0	5	–	3	–	0
Millsaps	2	–	2	–	1	4	–	4	–	2
Mercer	1	–	1	–	0	4	–	5	–	0
Centre	1	–	1	–	0	1	–	7	–	1
Union (TN)	2	–	3	–	1	6	–	4	–	1
Eastern Kentucky State Teachers	2	–	3	–	1	4	–	4	–	1
Murray State	2	–	4	–	0	4	–	5	–	0
Presbyterian	2	–	4	–	0	2	–	7	–	0
Rollins	1	–	3	–	0	2	–	5	–	0
Loyola (LA)	1	–	3	–	0	2	–	6	–	1
Newberry	1	–	4	–	0	2	–	8	–	0
SW Louisiana	1	–	4	–	0	2	–	8	–	0
Louisville	1	–	4	–	0	1	–	6	–	1
Louisiana Normal	1	–	5	–	0	2	–	9	–	0
West Tennessee State Teachers	0	–	3	–	1	1	–	6	–	1
Erskine	0	–	4	–	1	1	–	6	–	1
Mississippi College	0	–	5	–	1	2	–	6	–	1
Tennessee Tech	0	–	5	–	1	1	–	6	–	1
Morehead State	0	–	5	–	0	1	–	6	–	0
$ – Conference champion

The 1935 Centre Colonels football team represented Centre College as a member of the Dixie Conference and the Southern Intercollegiate Athletic Association (SIAA) in the 1935 college football season. Led by seventh-year head coach Ed Kubale, the Colonels compiled an overall record of 1–7–1 and with a mark of 0–0–1 in Dixie Conference play and 1–1 against SIAA competition. The team played home games at Farris Stadium in Danville, Kentucky.

== Schedule ==
Date	Time	Opponent	Site	Result	Attendance	Source
September 27	7:30 p.m.	at Temple*	Temple Stadium; Philadelphia, PA	L 13–25	15,000	
October 5	2:00 p.m.	at Indiana*	Memorial Stadium; Bloomington, IN	L 0–14	10,000	
October 11	2:30 p.m.	Georgetown (KY)	Farris Stadium; Danville, KY	W 20–0		
October 19	2:00 p.m.	vs. Washington and Lee*	duPont Stadium; Louisville, KY	L 7–14	5,000	
October 26	2:00 p.m.	at Tennessee*	Shields–Watkins Field; Knoxville, TN	L 14–25	5,000–6,000	
November 9	1:30 p.m.	at Xavier*	Corcoran Field; Cincinnati, OH	L 0–27	6,500	
November 16	2:00 p.m.	Ole Miss*^{†}	Farris Stadium; Danville, KY	L 0–26	3,500	
November 28	2:00 p.m.	at Chattanooga	Chamberlain Field; Chattanooga, TN	T 7–7	2,500	
December 7	2:00 p.m.	Western Kentucky State Teachers	Farris Stadium; Danville, KY	L 7–13	1,500	
*Non-conference game; ^{†}Homecoming; All times are in Central time
