= Bucky Moore =

American football player (1905–1980)

No. 25, 23, 43
- Position: Halfback

Personal information
- Born: May 5, 1905; McComb, Mississippi, U.S.
- Died: December 18, 1980 (aged 75); McComb, Mississippi, U.S.
- Listed height: 5 ft 11 in (1.80 m)
- Listed weight: 185 lb (84 kg)

Career information
- College: Loyola–New Orleans (1925–1928)

Career history
- Memphis Tigers (1929); Chicago Cardinals (1932); Pittsburgh Pirates (1933); Louisville Bourbons (1934)
- Stats at Pro Football Reference

William Elton "Bucky" Moore (May 5, 1905 – December 18, 1980) was an American professional football player who played two seasons in the National Football League (NFL) with the Chicago Cardinals and Pittsburgh Pirates. He played college football at Loyola College of New Orleans. Moore was nicknamed "the Dixie Flyer".

== Early life ==
William Elton Moore was born on May 5, 1905, in McComb, Mississippi. He attended McComb High School in McComb and Poplarville High School in Poplarville, Mississippi.

== College career ==
Moore played college football for the Loyola Wolf Pack of Loyola College of New Orleans. He was on the freshman team in 1925 and was a three-year letterman from 1926 to 1928. In 1926, he rushed for 1,131 yards, breaking the single season national record previously held by Red Grange. The 1926 Wolf Pack outscored their opponents 355 to 30 and had a perfect 10–0 record. Moore was injured for most of the 1927 season. In 1928, he had a 93-yard run against Spring Hill and a 98-yard run against Ole Miss. He was inducted into the Loyola Wolf Pack Hall of Fame in 1964, the Mississippi Sports Hall of Fame in 1965, and the Greater New Orleans Sports Hall of Fame in 1979.

== Professional career ==
Moore played for the semi-professional Memphis Tigers in 1929. On December 15, 1929, he scored a receiving touchdown in a 20–6 exhibition game victory over the 1929 Green Bay Packers, who were 12–0–1 during the 1929 NFL season. Moore also scored a receiving touchdown in a 16–6 Tigers' victory over the Chicago Bears.

Moore signed with the Chicago Cardinals of the National Football League in 1932. He played in four games, all starts, for the Cardinals during the 1932 season, rushing 21 times for 42 yards and one touchdown while also catching two passes for eight yards. He became a free agent after the season.

Moore was signed by the Pittsburgh Pirates of the NFL in 1933. He appeared in five games, starting three, for the Pirates during the team's inaugural 1933 season, recording 16 carries for 42 yards. He was released in 1933.

Moore played in four games, starting three, for the Louisville Bourbons of the American Football League in 1934, scoring one rushing touchdown and one passing touchdown.

== Personal life ==
Moore was nicknamed "the Dixie Flyer" during his football career. At one point, he was so popular that Elmer Chocolate based out of New Orleans, Louisiana named a candy bar after him, called "Dixie's Best". He died on December 18, 1980, in McComb, Mississippi.
