= Loyola Wolf Pack football =

Defunct football program formerly representing Loyola University, New Orleans, Louisiana

- First season: 1921
- Last season: 1939; 87 years ago
- Stadium: Loyola University Stadium
- Location: New Orleans, Louisiana
- Rivalries: Tulane
- Colors: Maroon and gold

The Loyola Wolf Pack football team was an intercollegiate American football team for Loyola University located in New Orleans, Louisiana, United States. The university formerly sponsored a varsity football team starting in 1921. The team was disbanded after the 1939 season for financial reasons. The team played at Loyola University Stadium starting in 1928.

== History ==
The 1926 football team went undefeated finishing with a 10-0 record behind the play of Bucky Moore.

== Head coaches ==
Years	Name
1921–1923	William Flynn
1924–1925	Moon Ducote
1926	Eddie Reed
1927–1932	Clark Shaughnessy
1933–1934	Robert Erskine
1935–1936	Eddie Reed
1937–1939	Larry Mullins

== Notable players ==
=== Loyola Wolf Pack players in the NFL ===
Player	Team	Tenure
Bucky Moore	Chicago Cardinals	1932
Bucky Moore	Pittsburgh Pirates	1933
Frank Sullivan	Chicago Bears	1935–39
Frank Sullivan	Pittsburgh Steelers	1940

== See also ==
- Loyola Wolf Pack
