= Black and Blue Bowl =

American college football rivalry

- Memphis Tigers Southern Miss Golden Eagles
- Sport: Football
- First meeting: October 26, 1935; Mississippi State Teachers, 12–0
- Latest meeting: November 24, 2012; Memphis, 42–24
- Next meeting: September 18, 2027
- Trophy: None

Statistics
- Total meetings: 63
- All-time series: Southern Miss, 40–22–1
- Largest victory: Southern Miss, 45–3 (1998)
- Longest win streak: Southern Miss, 7 (1994–2000)
- Current win streak: Memphis, 1 (2012–present)

Locations of Southern Miss and Memphis

The Black and Blue Bowl is the name given to the Memphis–Southern Miss football rivalry between the Tigers of the University of Memphis, and the Golden Eagles of the University of Southern Mississippi.

== History ==
The rivalry dates back to October 26, 1935. This yearly classic garnered its name from the intense competitive nature of the contest, as well as the competing schools' colors: the black of Southern Miss and the blue of Memphis. From 1995 to 2012, both teams were members of Conference USA in the Eastern Division. The series has been dormant since Memphis accepted an invitation to join the American Athletic Conference. The teams announced that they have scheduled a home-and-home football series for the 2027 and 2030 seasons.

== Game results ==
| Memphis victories | Southern Miss victories | Tie games |

| No. | Date | Location | Winner | Score |
|---|---|---|---|---|
| 1 | October 26, 1935 | Memphis, TN | Mississippi State Teachers | 12–0 |
| 2 | October 23, 1936 | Hattiesburg, MS | Mississippi State Teachers | 25–0 |
| 3 | September 27, 1952 | Hattiesburg, MS | Mississippi Southern | 27–20 |
| 4 | October 31, 1953 | Memphis, TN | Memphis State | 27–13 |
| 5 | November 20, 1954 | Hattiesburg, MS | Mississippi Southern | 34–21 |
| 6 | October 21, 1955 | Memphis, TN | Mississippi Southern | 34–14 |
| 7 | October 20, 1956 | Hattiesburg, MS | Mississippi Southern | 27–0 |
| 8 | October 19, 1957 | Memphis, TN | Mississippi Southern | 14–6 |
| 9 | October 4, 1958 | Hattiesburg, MS | Mississippi Southern | 24–22 |
| 10 | October 31, 1959 | Memphis, TN | Memphis State | 21–6 |
| 11 | November 18, 1960 | Hattiesburg, MS | Memphis State | 7–6 |
| 12 | October 14, 1961 | Memphis, TN | Memphis State | 21–7 |
| 13 | October 13, 1962 | Memphis, TN | Memphis State | 8–6 |
| 14 | September 14, 1963 | Jackson, MS | Memphis State | 28–7 |
| 15 | October 10, 1964 | Memphis, TN | Southern Miss | 20–14 |
| 16 | November 21, 1964 | Jackson, MS | Southern Miss | 20–18 |
| 17 | September 25, 1965 | Jackson, MS | Southern Miss | 21–16 |
| 18 | October 1, 1966 | Memphis, TN | Memphis State | 6–0 |
| 19 | October 28, 1967 | Jackson, MS | Memphis State | 24–8 |
| 20 | October 26, 1968 | Memphis, TN | Memphis State | 29–7 |
| 21 | November 8, 1969 | Memphis, TN | Memphis State | 37–7 |
| 22 | October 31, 1970 | Memphis, TN | Memphis State | 33–0 |
| 23 | October 23, 1971 | Memphis, TN | Memphis State | 27–12 |
| 24 | December 2, 1972 | Jackson, MS | Tie | 14–14 |
| 25 | November 10, 1973 | Memphis, TN | Southern Miss | 13–10 |
| 26 | September 14, 1974 | Memphis, TN | Southern Miss | 6–0 |
| 27 | October 11, 1975 | Memphis, TN | Southern Miss | 21–7 |
| 28 | November 20, 1976 | Hattiesburg, MS | Southern Miss | 14–12 |
| 29 | October 29, 1977 | Memphis, TN | Memphis State | 42–14 |
| 30 | October 21, 1978 | Memphis, TN | Southern Miss | 13–10 |
| 31 | October 20, 1979 | Hattiesburg, MS | Southern Miss | 22–0 |
| 32 | October 17, 1981 | Memphis, TN | Southern Miss | 10–0 |

| No. | Date | Location | Winner | Score |
|---|---|---|---|---|
| 33 | October 2, 1982 | Hattiesburg, MS | Southern Miss | 34–14 |
| 34 | October 15, 1983 | Memphis, TN | Southern Miss | 27–20 |
| 35 | September 29, 1984 | Hattiesburg, MS | Memphis State | 23–13 |
| 36 | October 19, 1985 | Memphis, TN | Southern Miss | 14–7 |
| 37 | October 18, 1986 | Hattiesburg, MS | Southern Miss | 14–9 |
| 38 | October 24, 1987 | Memphis, TN | Southern Miss | 17–14 |
| 39 | October 29, 1988 | Hattiesburg, MS | Southern Miss | 34–27 |
| 40 | October 28, 1989 | Memphis, TN | Southern Miss | 31–7 |
| 41 | October 20, 1990 | Hattiesburg, MS | Southern Miss | 23–7 |
| 42 | October 12, 1991 | Memphis, TN | Memphis State | 17–12 |
| 43 | September 4, 1992 | Hattiesburg, MS | Southern Miss | 23–21 |
| 44 | November 13, 1993 | Memphis, TN | Memphis State | 20–9 |
| 45 | September 17, 1994 | Hattiesburg, MS | Southern Miss | 20–3 |
| 46 | November 11, 1995 | Memphis, TN | Southern Miss | 17–9 |
| 47 | October 19, 1996 | Hattiesburg, MS | Southern Miss | 16–0 |
| 48 | November 22, 1997 | Memphis, TN | Southern Miss | 42–18 |
| 49 | November 14, 1998 | Hattiesburg, MS | Southern Miss | 45–3 |
| 50 | November 6, 1999 | Memphis, TN | #25 Southern Miss | 20–5 |
| 51 | September 30, 2000 | Hattiesburg, MS | #21 Southern Miss | 24–3 |
| 52 | October 6, 2001 | Memphis, TN | Memphis | 22–17 |
| 53 | September 14, 2002 | Hattiesburg, MS | Southern Miss | 33–14 |
| 54 | September 13, 2003 | Hattiesburg, MS | Southern Miss | 23–6 |
| 55 | November 12, 2004 | Memphis, TN | Memphis | 30–26 |
| 56 | November 19, 2005 | Hattiesburg, MS | Memphis | 24–22 |
| 57 | November 5, 2006 | Memphis, TN | Southern Miss | 42–21 |
| 58 | November 10, 2007 | Hattiesburg, MS | Memphis | 29–26 |
| 59 | October 25, 2008 | Memphis, TN | Memphis | 36–30 |
| 60 | October 17, 2009 | Hattiesburg, MS | Southern Miss | 36–16 |
| 61 | October 16, 2010 | Memphis, TN | Southern Miss | 41–19 |
| 62 | November 26, 2011 | Hattiesburg, MS | Southern Miss | 44–7 |
| 63 | November 24, 2012 | Memphis, TN | Memphis | 42–24 |
Series: Southern Miss leads 40–22–1

== See also ==
- List of NCAA college football rivalry games
