= 1935 East Carolina Pirates football team =

American college football season

1935 East Carolina Pirates football
- Conference: Independent
- Record: 3–3
- Head coach: Doc Mathis (2nd season)

1935 Southern college football independents records
| | Conf. | | | Overall |
| Team | W | L | T | W | | L | | T |
|---|---|---|---|---|---|---|---|---|
| Catholic University | | – | | 8 | – | 1 | – | 0 |
| William & Mary Norfolk | | – | | 8 | – | 1 | – | 0 |
| Texas Wesleyan | | – | | 8 | – | 2 | – | 1 |
| George Washington | | – | | 6 | – | 3 | – | 0 |
| Hardin–Simmons | | – | | 6 | – | 3 | – | 1 |
| Navy | | – | | 5 | – | 4 | – | 0 |
| Western Maryland | | – | | 6 | – | 5 | – | 0 |
| East Carolina | | – | | 3 | – | 3 | – | 0 |
| Georgetown | | – | | 4 | – | 4 | – | 0 |
| Troy State | | – | | 5 | – | 5 | – | 0 |
| South Georgia Teachers | | – | | 3 | – | 3 | – | 2 |
| West Virginia | | – | | 3 | – | 4 | – | 2 |
| Oklahoma City | | – | | 3 | – | 4 | – | 1 |
| Texas A&I | | – | | 3 | – | 5 | – | 0 |
| Delaware | | – | | 2 | – | 5 | – | 1 |
| Jacksonville State | | – | | 2 | – | 5 | – | 0 |
| Wake Forest | | – | | 2 | – | 7 | – | 0 |
| Oglethorpe | | – | | 1 | – | 8 | – | 0 |

The 1935 East Carolina Pirates football team was an American football team that represented East Carolina Teachers College (now known as East Carolina University) as an independent during the 1935 college football season. In their second season under head coach Doc Mathis, the team compiled a 3–3 record.

== Schedule ==
| Date | Time | Opponent | Site | Result | Source |
|---|---|---|---|---|---|
| October 12 | | at Wingate | Wingate, NC | L 0–6 | |
| October 26 | | Oak Ridge Military Academy | Greenville, NC | L 2–6 | |
| November 2 | | Chowan | Greenville, NC | W 46–0 | |
| November 15 | 2:30 p.m. | at William & Mary Norfolk Division | Trucker Stadium; Portsmouth, VA | W 10–6 | |
| November 23 | | Appalachian State | Greenville, NC | L 6–14 | |
| November 26 | | at Louisburg | Louisburg, NC | W 13–0 | |
All times are in Eastern time
