= 1935 Southwestern Lynx football team =

American college football season

1935 Southwestern Lynx football
- Conference: Dixie Conference
- Record: 3–4–3 (2–2–2 Dixie)
- Head coach: Clyde Propst (1st season)
- Home stadium: Hodges Field; Fargason Field

1935 Dixie Conference football standings
	Conf.					Overall
Team	W		L		T	W		L		T
Howard (AL) $	3	–	0	–	1	7	–	1	–	2
Chattanooga	3	–	1	–	1	4	–	3	–	1
Spring Hill	2	–	1	–	2	7	–	2	–	2
Millsaps	1	–	1	–	2	4	–	4	–	2
Southwestern (TN)	2	–	2	–	2	3	–	4	–	2
Mercer	1	–	1	–	0	4	–	5	–	0
Loyola (LA)	2	–	2	–	0	2	–	6	–	1
Birmingham–Southern	2	–	5	–	0	2	–	6	–	0
Mississippi College	1	–	4	–	1	2	–	6	–	1
Centre	0	–	0	–	1	1	–	7	–	1
$ – Conference champion

The 1935 Southwestern Lynx football team was an American football team that represented Southwestern, The College of the Mississippi Valley (now known as Rhodes College) as a member of the Dixie Conference in the 1935 college football season. Led by Clyde Propst in his first season as head coach, the team compiled an overall record of 3–4–3, with a mark of 2–2–2 in conference play, and finished fifth in the Dixie.

== Schedule ==
Date	Opponent	Site	Result	Attendance	Source
September 20	Arkansas State*	Hodges Field; Memphis, TN	W 38–0	2,500	
September 28	at Tennessee*	Shields–Watkins Field; Knoxville, TN	L 0–20	7,500	
October 5	at Ole Miss*	Hemingway Stadium; Oxford, MS	L 0–32		
October 12	Millsaps	Fargason Field; Memphis, TN	W 20–0		
October 18	at Mississippi College	Municipal Stadium; Jackson, MS	W 13–0		
November 2	Howard (AL)	Fargason Field; Memphis, TN	T 7–7	2,500	
November 9	at Birmingham–Southern	Legion Field; Birmingham, AL	L 0–12	2,500	
November 16	Chattanooga	Fargason Field; Memphis, TN	L 0–12		
November 23	at Union (TN)*	Jackson, TN	T 0–0	2,500	
November 28	at Spring Hill	Dorn Stadium; Mobile, AL	T 14–14		
*Non-conference game
