= 1935 Michigan State Spartans football team =

American college football season

1935 Michigan State Spartans football
- Conference: Independent
- Record: 6–2
- Head coach: Charlie Bachman (3rd season)
- Offensive scheme: Notre Dame Box
- MVP: Sid Wagner
- Captain: Sid Wagner
- Home stadium: Macklin Field

1935 Midwestern college football independents records
	Conf.			Overall
Team	W	L	T	W		L		T
No. 23 Marquette		–		7	–	1	–	0
No. 8 Notre Dame		–		7	–	1	–	1
Michigan State		–		6	–	2	–	0
DePaul		–		5	–	2	–	1
Wayne		–		5	–	2	–	1
Detroit		–		6	–	3	–	0
Xavier		–		6	–	3	–	0
Michigan State Normal		–		4	–	2	–	2
Western State Teachers		–		5	–	3	–	0
Michigan Tech		–		2	–	2	–	1
Saint Louis		–		5	–	6	–	0
Central State (MI)		–		1	–	6	–	0
Haskell		–		0	–	7	–	1
Rankings from United Press

The 1935 Michigan State Spartans football team represented Michigan State College as an independent during the 1935 college football season. In their third season under head coach Charlie Bachman, the Spartans compiled a 6–2 record and won their annual rivalry game with Michigan by a 25 to 6 score. In inter-sectional play, the team defeated Kansas (42–0) and the Loyola Lions (27–0) but lost to Boston College (18–6).

Guard Sid Wagner was a consensus first-team player on the 1935 College Football All-America Team.

== Schedule ==
Date	Opponent	Site	Result	Attendance	Source
September 28	Grinnell	Macklin Field; East Lansing, MI	W 41–0		
October 5	at Michigan	Michigan Stadium; Ann Arbor, MI (rivalry)	W 25–6	32,315	
October 12	Kansas	Macklin Field; East Lansing, MI	W 42–0		
October 19	at Boston College	Alumni Field; Chestnut Hill, MA	L 6–18		
October 26	Washington University	Macklin Field; East Lansing, MI	W 47–13		
November 2	at Temple	Temple Stadium; Philadelphia, PA	W 12–7	25,000	
November 9	Marquette^{†}	Macklin Field; East Lansing, MI	L 7–13	20,000	
November 16	at Loyola (CA)	Gilmore Stadium; Los Angeles, CA	W 27–0	9,000	
^{†}Homecoming

== Game summaries ==
=== Michigan ===
On October 5, Michigan State opened its 1935 season with its annual rivalry game against the Michigan Wolverines. The Spartans had defeated the Wolverines in 1934 for the first time since 1915. Led by head coach Charlie Bachman and left halfback Kurt Warmbein, the Spartans again defeated the Wolverines, 25 to 6. It was the first time the Spartans had defeated the Wolverines in consecutive games.
