= Sidney Wagner =

Sidney Wagner may refer to:

- Sidney Wagner (cinematographer)
- Sid Wagner, American football player
