= 1935 Drake Bulldogs football team =

American college football season

1935 Drake Bulldogs football
- Conference: Missouri Valley Conference
- Record: 4–4–2 (1–2–1 MVC)
- Head coach: Vee Green (3rd season)
- Home stadium: Drake Stadium

1935 Missouri Valley Conference football standings
	Conf.					Overall
Team	W		L		T	W		L		T
Washington University +	3	–	0	–	0	6	–	4	–	0
Tulsa +	3	–	0	–	0	3	–	6	–	1
Creighton	2	–	1	–	1	3	–	5	–	1
Drake	1	–	2	–	1	4	–	4	–	2
Washburn	1	–	2	–	0	4	–	6	–	0
Grinnell	1	–	2	–	0	3	–	5	–	1
Oklahoma A&M	0	–	3	–	0	3	–	7	–	0
+ – Conference co-champions

The 1935 Drake Bulldogs football team was an American football team that represented Drake University in the Missouri Valley Conference (MVC) during the 1935 college football season. In its third season under head coach Vee Green, the team compiled a 3–6–1 record (2–2 against MVC opponents), tied for fourth place in the conference, and was outscored by a total of 204 to 141.

== Schedule ==
Date	Time	Opponent	Site	Result	Attendance	Source
September 28		Central (IA)*	Drake Stadium; Des Moines, IA	W 27–0		
October 5		Simpson*	Drake Stadium; Des Moines, IA	W 40–12		
October 12		at Ohio State*	Ohio Stadium; Columbus, OH	L 7–85	28,927	
October 19		at Creighton	Creighton Stadium; Omaha, NE	T 6–6	> 10,000	
October 25	8:15 p.m.	Haskell*	Drake Stadium; Des Moines, IA	W 21–0	3,500	
November 2		Grinnell	Drake Stadium; Des Moines, IA	W 33–21		
November 9		at Washington University	Francis Field; St. Louis, MO	L 0–13		
November 16	2:00 p.m.	Iowa State*	Drake Stadium; Des Moines, IA	T 7–7	7,533	
November 23		at Tulsa	Skelly Field; Tulsa, OK	L 0–7	7,000	
November 30		at Arizona*	Arizona Stadium; Tucson, AZ	L 0–53		
*Non-conference game; All times are in Central time
