= 1935 Wyoming Cowboys football team =

American college football season

1935 Wyoming Cowboys football
- Conference: Rocky Mountain Conference
- Record: 4–4 (3–4 RMC)
- Head coach: Willard Witte (3rd season)
- Captain: None
- Home stadium: Corbett Field

1935 Rocky Mountain Conference football standings
	Conf.					Overall
Team	W		L		T	W		L		T
Utah State +	5	–	1	–	1	5	–	2	–	1
Colorado +	5	–	1	–	0	5	–	4	–	0
Utah	4	–	1	–	1	4	–	3	–	1
Denver	5	–	2	–	0	6	–	3	–	0
Colorado State–Greeley	2	–	1	–	0	4	–	3	–	0
Colorado College	4	–	2	–	1	4	–	3	–	1
BYU	3	–	4	–	0	4	–	4	–	0
Wyoming	3	–	4	–	0	4	–	4	–	0
Colorado A&M	2	–	4	–	1	3	–	4	–	1
Montana State	1	–	5	–	0	2	–	6	–	1
Colorado Mines	1	–	6	–	0	1	–	6	–	0
Western State (CO)	0	–	4	–	0	1	–	6	–	0
+ – Conference co-champions

The 1935 Wyoming Cowboys football team was an American football team that represented the University of Wyoming as a member of the Rocky Mountain Conference (RMC) during the 1935 college football season. In their third season under head coach Willard Witte, the Cowboys compiled a 4–4 record (3–4 against RMC opponents), finished eighth in the RMC, and outscored opponents by a total of 76 to 59.

== Schedule ==
Date	Opponent	Site	Result	Attendance	Source
September 21	at Fort Warren*	Cheyenne, WY	W 15–0		
September 28	Colorado A&M	Corbett Field; Laramie, WY (rivalry)	L 3–12		
October 5	Colorado Mines	Corbett Field; Laramie, WY	W 40–0		
October 11	at Denver	Denver University Stadium; Denver, CO	L 0–14	13,000	
October 26	BYU	Corbett Field; Laramie, WY	L 6–13		
November 2	at Montana State	Gatton Field; Bozeman, MT	W 6–2		
November 9	at Utah State	Aggie Stadium; Logan, UT (rivalry)	L 0–16		
November 23	at Colorado	Colorado Stadium; Boulder, CO	W 6–0		
*Non-conference game
