= 1935 Washington University Bears football team =

American college football season

1935 Washington University Bears football

MVC co-champion
- Conference: Missouri Valley Conference
- Record: 6–4 (3–0 MVC)
- Head coach: Jimmy Conzelman (4th season)
- Home stadium: Francis Field

1935 Missouri Valley Conference football standings
	Conf.					Overall
Team	W		L		T	W		L		T
Washington University +	3	–	0	–	0	6	–	4	–	0
Tulsa +	3	–	0	–	0	3	–	6	–	1
Creighton	2	–	1	–	1	3	–	5	–	1
Drake	1	–	2	–	1	4	–	4	–	2
Washburn	1	–	2	–	0	4	–	6	–	0
Grinnell	1	–	2	–	0	3	–	5	–	1
Oklahoma A&M	0	–	3	–	0	3	–	7	–	0
+ – Conference co-champions

The 1935 Washington University Bears football team represented Washington University in St. Louis as a member of the Missouri Valley Conference (MVC) during the 1935 college football season. In its fourth season under head coach Jimmy Conzelman, the team compiled a 6–4 record (3–0 against MVC opponents), tied for the MVC championship, and outscored opponents by a total of 185 to 149. The team played its home games at Francis Field in St. Louis.

== Schedule ==
Date	Time	Opponent	Site	Result	Attendance	Source
September 28		McKendree*	Francis Field; St. Louis, MO	W 24–0		
October 5		at Illinois*	Memorial Stadium; Champaign, IL	L 6–28		
October 12		SMU*	Francis Field; St. Louis, MO	L 6–35	11,000	
October 18	7:15 p.m.	at Duquesne*	Forbes Field; Pittsburgh, PA	L 6–13		
October 26		at Michigan State*	Macklin Field; East Lansing, MI	L 13–47		
November 2		Creighton	Francis Field; St. Louis, MO	W 33–7	5,500	
November 9		Drake	Francis Field; St. Louis, MO	W 13–0		
November 16		Missouri*^{†}	Francis Field; St. Louis, MO	W 19–6	8,544	
November 28		Saint Louis*	Francis Field; St. Louis, MO	W 26–0	18,000	
December 7		Oklahoma A&M	Francis Field; St. Louis, MO	W 39–13		
*Non-conference game; ^{†}Homecoming; All times are in Central time
