= 1935 Montana State Bobcats football team =

American college football season

1935 Montana State Bobcats football
- Conference: Rocky Mountain Conference
- Record: 2–6–1 (1–5 RMC)
- Head coach: Schubert R. Dyche (8th season)
- Home stadium: Gatton Field

1935 Rocky Mountain Conference football standings
	Conf.					Overall
Team	W		L		T	W		L		T
Colorado +	5	–	1	–	0	5	–	4	–	0
Utah State +	5	–	1	–	1	5	–	2	–	1
Utah	4	–	1	–	1	4	–	3	–	1
Denver	5	–	2	–	0	6	–	3	–	0
Colorado College	4	–	2	–	1	4	–	3	–	1
Colorado State–Greeley	2	–	1	–	0	4	–	3	–	0
BYU	3	–	4	–	0	4	–	4	–	0
Wyoming	3	–	4	–	0	4	–	4	–	0
Colorado A&M	2	–	4	–	1	3	–	4	–	1
Montana State	1	–	5	–	0	2	–	6	–	1
Colorado Mines	1	–	6	–	0	1	–	6	–	0
Western State (CO)	0	–	4	–	0	1	–	6	–	0
+ – Conference co-champions

The 1935 Montana State Bobcats football team was an American football team that represented Montana State College (later renamed Montana State University) in the Rocky Mountain Conference (RMC) during the 1935 college football season. In their eighth season under head coach Schubert R. Dyche, the Bobcats compiled a 2–6–1 record (1–5 in RMC games) and was outscored by a total of 136 to 29.

== Schedule ==
Date	Opponent	Site	Result	Source
September 21	at Utah State	Aggie Stadium; Logan, UT	L 7–33	
September 28	BYU	Gatton Field; Bozeman, MT	W 7–0	
October 5	vs. Montana*	Clark Park; Butte, MT (rivalry)	L 0–20	
October 12	at Utah	Ute Stadium; Salt Lake City, UT	L 0–47	
October 19	at Colorado State–Greeley	Jackson Field; Greeley, CO	L 0–6	
November 2	Wyoming^{†}	Gatton Field; Bozeman, MT	L 2–6	
November 11	at Idaho Southern Branch*	Hutchinson Field; Pocatello, ID	T 7–7	
November 16	at Colorado College	Washburn Field; Colorado Springs, CO	L 0–14	
November 28	at Montana Mines*	Clark Park; Butte, MT	W 6–3	
*Non-conference game; ^{†}Homecoming
