= 1935 DePaul Blue Demons football team =

American college football season

1935 DePaul Blue Demons football
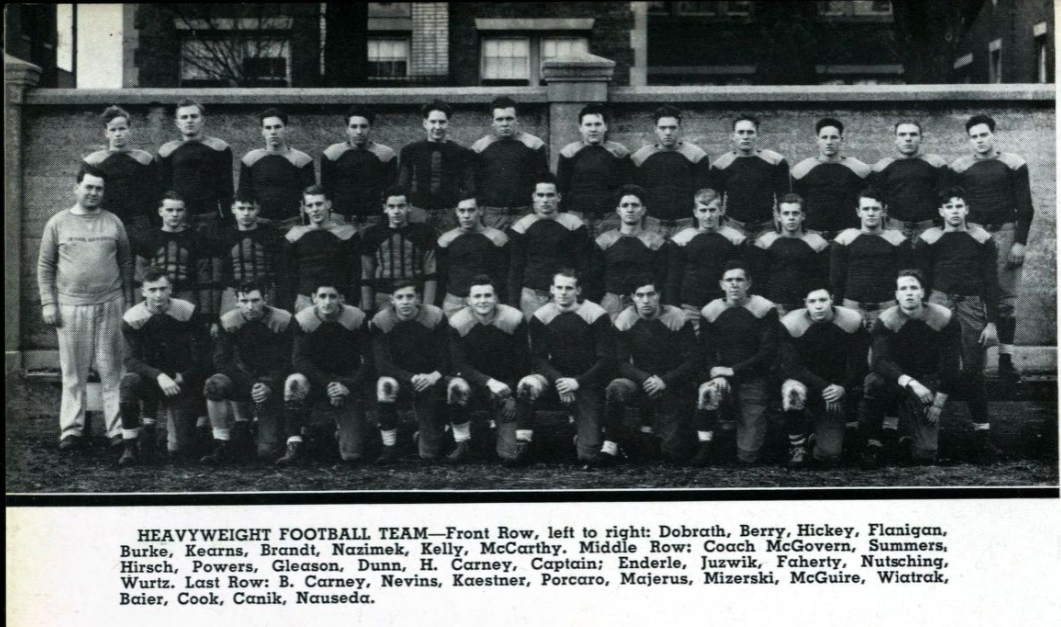
- Conference: Independent
- Record: 5–2–1
- Head coach: Jim Kelly (4th season)
- Home stadium: Soldier Field

1935 Midwestern college football independents records
	Conf.			Overall
Team	W	L	T	W		L		T
No. 23 Marquette		–		7	–	1	–	0
No. 8 Notre Dame		–		7	–	1	–	1
Michigan State		–		6	–	2	–	0
DePaul		–		5	–	2	–	1
Wayne		–		5	–	2	–	1
Detroit		–		6	–	3	–	0
Xavier		–		6	–	3	–	0
Michigan State Normal		–		4	–	2	–	2
Western State Teachers		–		5	–	3	–	0
Michigan Tech		–		2	–	2	–	1
Saint Louis		–		5	–	6	–	0
Central State (MI)		–		1	–	6	–	0
Haskell		–		0	–	7	–	1
Rankings from United Press

The 1935 DePaul Blue Demons football team was an American football team that represented DePaul University as an independent during the 1935 college football season. Led by fourth-year head coach Jim Kelly, the Blue Demons compiled a record of 5–2–1 and outscored opponents 123 to 36. DePaul played home games at Soldier Field in Chicago.

== Schedule ==
Date	Opponent	Site	Result	Attendance	Source
September 28	at Northwestern	Dyche Stadium; Evanston, IL	L 0–14	20,000	
October 6	at St. Ambrose	Municipal Stadium; Davenport, IA	W 26–7	2,500	
October 12	Texas Tech	Soldier Field; Chicago, IL	T 0–0	3,000	
October 19	at Dayton	UD Stadium; Dayton, OH	W 14–3	5,000	
October 26	at Western State Teachers (MI)	Western State Teachers College Field; Kalamazoo, MI	W 26–0		
November 2	Catholic University	Soldier Field; Chicago, IL	W 9–6	5,000	
November 9	at Valparaiso	Brown Field; Valparaiso, IN	W 48–0		
November 23	Saint Louis	Soldier Field; Chicago, IL	L 0–6	2,000	
