= 1935 North Dakota Fighting Sioux football team =

American college football season

1935 North Dakota Fighting Sioux football
- Conference: North Central Conference
- Record: 6–2–2 (3–0–2 NCC)
- Head coach: Charles A. West (8th season)

1935 North Central Conference football standings
	Conf.					Overall
Team	W		L		T	W		L		T
North Dakota Agricultural $	4	–	0	–	1	7	–	1	–	1
North Dakota	3	–	0	–	2	6	–	2	–	2
Iowa State Teachers	2	–	0	–	0	6	–	3	–	0
South Dakota	2	–	2	–	1	5	–	3	–	1
South Dakota State	1	–	3	–	1	4	–	4	–	1
Omaha	1	–	3	–	0	6	–	3	–	0
Morningside	0	–	5	–	1	0	–	6	–	1
$ – Conference champion

The 1935 North Dakota Fighting Sioux football team, also known as the Nodaks, was an American football team that represented the University of North Dakota in the North Central Conference (NCC) during the 1935 college football season. In their eighth year under head coach Charles A. West, the Fighting Sioux compiled a 6–2–2 record (3–0–2 against NCC opponents), finished in second place out of seven teams in the NCC, and outscored opponents by a total of 165 to 78.

== Schedule ==
Date	Opponent	Site	Result	Attendance	Source
September 20	Moorhead Teachers*	Memorial Stadium; Grand Forks, ND	W 13–6		
September 27	Luther (IA)*	Memorial Stadium; Grand Forks, ND	W 45–0		
October 11	South Dakota	Memorial Stadium; Grand Forks, ND (rivalry)	W 25–0		
October 19	at South Dakota State	State Field; Brookings, SD	T 6–6		
October 26	North Dakota Agricultural^{†}	Memorial Stadium; Grand Forks, ND (rivalry)	T 20–20	8,000	
November 2	at Morningside	Yards Park; Sioux City, IA	W 28–7		
November 8	at Saint Louis*	Walsh Memorial Stadium; St. Louis, MO	W 7–6	6,500	
November 16	at Omaha	Omaha, NE	W 14–6		
November 23	at Western Maryland*	Baltimore Stadium; Baltimore, MD	L 7–13	5,000	
November 28	at George Washington*	Griffith Stadium; Washington, DC	L 0–13		
*Non-conference game; ^{†}Homecoming
