= 1935 Kansas Jayhawks football team =

American college football season

1935 Kansas Jayhawks football
- Conference: Big Six Conference
- Record: 4–4–1 (2–2–1 Big 6)
- Head coach: Adrian Lindsey (4th season)
- Captain: John Peterson
- Home stadium: Memorial Stadium

1935 Big Six Conference football standings
	Conf.					Overall
Team	W		L		T	W		L		T
No. 21 Nebraska $	4	–	0	–	1	6	–	2	–	1
Oklahoma	3	–	2	–	0	6	–	3	–	0
Kansas	2	–	2	–	1	4	–	4	–	1
Kansas State	1	–	2	–	2	2	–	4	–	3
Iowa State	1	–	3	–	1	2	–	4	–	3
Missouri	0	–	2	–	3	3	–	3	–	3
$ – Conference champion; Rankings from United Press

The 1935 Kansas Jayhawks football team represented the University of Kansas in the Big Six Conference during the 1935 college football season. In their fourth season under head coach Adrian Lindsey, the Jayhawks compiled a 4–4–1 record (2–2–1 against conference opponents), finished in third place in the conference, and were outscored by opponents by a combined total of 118 to 102. They played their home games at Memorial Stadium in Lawrence, Kansas. John Peterson was the team captain.

== Schedule ==
Date	Opponent	Site	Result	Attendance	Source
September 28	at Notre Dame*	Notre Dame Stadium; Notre Dame, IN	L 7–28	11,102–25,000	
October 5	St. Benedict's*	Memorial Stadium; Lawrence, KS	W 42–0		
October 12	at Michigan State*	Macklin Field; East Lansing, MI	L 0–42		
October 26	Kansas State	Memorial Stadium; Lawrence, KS (rivalry)	W 9–2		
November 2	at Oklahoma	Memorial Stadium; Norman, OK	W 7–0		
November 9	at Nebraska	Memorial Stadium; Lincoln, NE (rivalry)	L 13–19		
November 16	at Colorado*	Colorado Stadium; Boulder, CO	W 12–6		
November 23	Iowa State	Memorial Stadium; Lawrence, KS	L 12–21		
November 28	Missouri^{†}	Memorial Stadium; Lawrence, KS (rivalry)	T 0–0	17,000	
*Non-conference game; ^{†}Homecoming
