= 1935 Tulsa Golden Hurricane football team =

American college football season

1935 Tulsa Golden Hurricane football

MVC co-champion
- Conference: Missouri Valley Conference
- Record: 3–6–1 (3–0 MVC)
- Head coach: Gus Henderson (11th season)
- Home stadium: Skelly Field

1935 Missouri Valley Conference football standings
	Conf.					Overall
Team	W		L		T	W		L		T
Washington University +	3	–	0	–	0	6	–	4	–	0
Tulsa +	3	–	0	–	0	3	–	6	–	1
Creighton	2	–	1	–	1	3	–	5	–	1
Drake	1	–	2	–	1	4	–	4	–	2
Washburn	1	–	2	–	0	4	–	6	–	0
Grinnell	1	–	2	–	0	3	–	5	–	1
Oklahoma A&M	0	–	3	–	0	3	–	7	–	0
+ – Conference co-champions

Harold Wickersham, blocking back for the Golden Hurricane of the class of 1935, was in camp with the Detroit Lions in 1936.

The 1935 Tulsa Golden Hurricane football team represented the University of Tulsa during the 1935 college football season. In their eleventh and final year under head coach Gus Henderson, the Golden Hurricane compiled a 3–6–1 record, but was 3–0 in conference play and tied for the Missouri Valley Conference championship. The team defeated Oklahoma A&M (12–0), Washburn (19–6), and Drake (7–0), tied Kansas State (13–13), and lost to SMU (14), TCU (14–12), Centenary (22–0), George Washington (3–0), and Arkansas (14–7).

== Schedule ==
Date	Opponent	Site	Result	Attendance	Source
September 27	Central State Teachers*	Skelly Field; Tulsa, OK	L 0–9	8,000	
October 5	SMU*	Skelly Field; Tulsa, OK	L 0–14	10,000–12,000	
October 12	TCU*	Skelly Field; Tulsa, OK	L 0–13	9,000	
October 18	at Washburn	Moore Bowl; Topeka, KS	W 19–6	4,500	
October 26	Oklahoma A&M^{†}	Skelly Field; Tulsa, OK (rivalry)	W 12–0	7,500	
November 2	Kansas State*	Skelly Field; Tulsa, OK	T 13–13	7,000	
November 9	at Centenary*	Shreveport, LA	L 0–22	5,000	
November 16	at George Washington*	Griffith Stadium; Washington, DC	L 0–3	12,000	
November 23	Drake	Skelly Field; Tulsa, OK	W 7–0	7,000	
November 28	Arkansas*	Skelly Field; Tulsa, OK	L 7–14	11,000	
*Non-conference game; ^{†}Homecoming

== 1936 NFL draft ==
The following Golden Hurricane players were drafted into the National Football League following the season.

Round	Pick	Player	Position	NFL Club
7	59	Tack Denis	Back	Chicago Cardinals
