= 1935 Western State Teachers Hilltoppers football team =

American college football season

1935 Western State Teachers Hilltoppers football
- Conference: Independent
- Record: 5–3
- Head coach: Mike Gary (7th season)
- Captains: Frank Secory; Harold Reynolds

1935 Midwestern college football independents records
	Conf.			Overall
Team	W	L	T	W		L		T
No. 23 Marquette		–		7	–	1	–	0
No. 8 Notre Dame		–		7	–	1	–	1
Michigan State		–		6	–	2	–	0
DePaul		–		5	–	2	–	1
Wayne		–		5	–	2	–	1
Detroit		–		6	–	3	–	0
Xavier		–		6	–	3	–	0
Michigan State Normal		–		4	–	2	–	2
Western State Teachers		–		5	–	3	–	0
Michigan Tech		–		2	–	2	–	1
Saint Louis		–		5	–	6	–	0
Central State (MI)		–		1	–	6	–	0
Haskell		–		0	–	7	–	1
Rankings from United Press

The 1935 Western State Teachers Hilltoppers football team represented Western State Teachers College (later renamed Western Michigan University) as an independent during the 1935 college football season. In their seventh season under head coach Mike Gary, the Hilltoppers compiled a 5–3 record and were outscored by their opponents, 91 to 78. Guard Frank Secory and quarterback Harold Reynolds were the team captains.

== Schedule ==
Date	Opponent	Site	Result	Source
September 28	Illinois College	Western State Teachers College Field; Kalamazoo, MI	W 13–0	
October 5	Western Kentucky State Teachers	Western State Teachers College Field; Kalamazoo, MI	W 6–0	
October 12	at Chicago	Stagg Field; Chicago, IL	L 6–31	
October 19	at Iowa State Teachers	Cedar Falls, IA	L 14–21	
October 26	DePaul^{†}	Western State Teachers College Field; Kalamazoo, MI	L 0–26	
November 9	at Central State (MI)	Alumni Field; Mount Pleasant, MI (rivalry)	W 13–0	
November 16	Butler	Western State Teachers College Field; Kalamazoo, MI	W 19–7	
November 23	at West Chester	West Chester, PA	W 7–6	
^{†}Homecoming
