= 1935 Colorado A&M Aggies football team =

American college football season

1935 Colorado A&M Aggies football
- Conference: Rocky Mountain Conference
- Record: 3–4–1 (2–4–1 RMC)
- Head coach: Harry W. Hughes (25th season)
- Home stadium: Colorado Field

1935 Rocky Mountain Conference football standings
| | Conf. | | | | | Overall |
| Team | W | | L | | T | W | | L | | T |
|---|---|---|---|---|---|---|---|---|---|---|
| Utah State + | 5 | – | 1 | – | 1 | 5 | – | 2 | – | 1 |
| Colorado + | 5 | – | 1 | – | 0 | 5 | – | 4 | – | 0 |
| Utah | 4 | – | 1 | – | 1 | 4 | – | 3 | – | 1 |
| Denver | 5 | – | 2 | – | 0 | 6 | – | 3 | – | 0 |
| Colorado State–Greeley | 2 | – | 1 | – | 0 | 4 | – | 3 | – | 0 |
| Colorado College | 4 | – | 2 | – | 1 | 4 | – | 3 | – | 1 |
| BYU | 3 | – | 4 | – | 0 | 4 | – | 4 | – | 0 |
| Wyoming | 3 | – | 4 | – | 0 | 4 | – | 4 | – | 0 |
| Colorado A&M | 2 | – | 4 | – | 1 | 3 | – | 4 | – | 1 |
| Montana State | 1 | – | 5 | – | 0 | 2 | – | 6 | – | 1 |
| Colorado Mines | 1 | – | 6 | – | 0 | 1 | – | 6 | – | 0 |
| Western State (CO) | 0 | – | 4 | – | 0 | 1 | – | 6 | – | 0 |
+ – Conference co-champions

The 1935 Colorado A&M Aggies football team represented Colorado A&M (now known as Colorado State University) in the Rocky Mountain Conference (RMC) during the 1935 college football season. It was the team's first season competing as Colorado A&M, a change from the university's previous name of Colorado Agricultural College. In their 25th season under head coach Harry W. Hughes, the Aggies compiled a 3–4–1 record (2–4–1 against RMC opponents), finished ninth in the RMC, and were outscored by a total of 75 to 58.

== Schedule ==
| Date | Opponent | Site | Result | Source |
|---|---|---|---|---|
| September 28 | at Wyoming | Corbett Field; Laramie, WY (rivalry) | W 12–3 | |
| October 5 | at Denver | Denver University Stadium; Denver, CO | L 14–20 | |
| October 12 | Colorado Mines | Colorado Field; Fort Collins, CO | W 19–0 | |
| October 26 | at Colorado | Colorado Stadium; Fort Collins, CO (rivalry) | L 6–19 | |
| November 2 | at Utah State | Aggie Stadium; Logan, UT | L 0–13 | |
| November 16 | Utah | Colorado Field; Fort Collins, CO | L 0–14 | |
| November 23 | at Colorado College | Washburn Field; Colorado Springs, CO | T 0–0 | |
| November 28 | at New Mexico* | University Field; Albuquerque, NM | W 7–6 | |
*Non-conference game
