= 1935 Cincinnati Bearcats football team =

American college football season

1935 Cincinnati Bearcats football
- Conference: Buckeye Athletic Association
- Record: 7–2 (3–2 BAA)
- Head coach: Russ Cohen (1st season)
- Captain: Ray Nolting
- Home stadium: Nippert Stadium

1935 Buckeye Athletic Association football standings
	Conf.					Overall
Team	W		L		T	W		L		T
No. 21 Ohio $	5	–	0	–	0	8	–	0	–	0
Cincinnati	3	–	2	–	0	7	–	2	–	0
Ohio Wesleyan	3	–	2	–	0	5	–	3	–	1
Dayton	2	–	2	–	1	4	–	4	–	1
Miami (OH)	1	–	3	–	1	5	–	3	–	1
Marshall	0	–	5	–	0	4	–	6	–	0
$ – Conference champion; Rankings from United Press

The 1935 Cincinnati Bearcats football team was an American football team that represented the University of Cincinnati as a member of the Buckeye Athletic Association during the 1935 college football season. In their first season under head coach Russ Cohen, the Bearcats compiled a 7–2 record.

== Schedule ==
Date	Opponent	Site	Result	Attendance	Source
September 28	Dayton	Nippert Stadium; Cincinnati, OH	W 29–0		
October 5	South Dakota State*	Nippert Stadium; Cincinnati, OH	W 38–0	9,500	
October 12	at Denison*	Deeds Field-Piper Stadium; Granville, OH	W 35–0		
October 19	Indiana*	Nippert Stadium; Cincinnati, OH	W 7–0		
October 26	Baltimore	Nippert Stadium; Cincinnati, OH	W 67–0		
November 2	at Ohio Wesleyan	Delaware, OH	L 12–13		
November 9	at Marshall	Fairfield Stadium; Huntington, WV	W 39–13		
November 16	at Ohio	Peden Stadium; Athens, OH	L 6–16		
November 28	Miami (OH)	Nippert Stadium; Cincinnati, OH	W 8–7		
*Non-conference game
