= 1935 Marquette Golden Avalanche football team =

American college football season

1935 Marquette Golden Avalanche football
- Conference: Independent
- Record: 7–1
- Head coach: Frank Murray (14th season)
- Home stadium: Marquette Stadium

1935 Midwestern college football independents records
	Conf.			Overall
Team	W	L	T	W		L		T
No. 23 Marquette		–		7	–	1	–	0
No. 8 Notre Dame		–		7	–	1	–	1
Michigan State		–		6	–	2	–	0
DePaul		–		5	–	2	–	1
Wayne		–		5	–	2	–	1
Detroit		–		6	–	3	–	0
Xavier		–		6	–	3	–	0
Michigan State Normal		–		4	–	2	–	2
Western State Teachers		–		5	–	3	–	0
Michigan Tech		–		2	–	2	–	1
Saint Louis		–		5	–	6	–	0
Central State (MI)		–		1	–	6	–	0
Haskell		–		0	–	7	–	1
Rankings from United Press

The 1935 Marquette Golden Avalanche football team was an American football team that represented Marquette University as an independent during the 1935 college football season. In its 14th season under head coach Frank Murray, the team compiled a 7–1 record and outscored its opponents by a total of 173 to 65. Its victories including major college opponents, Wisconsin, Ole Miss, and Michigan State, and its sole loss was to Temple. The team played its home games at Marquette Stadium in Milwaukee.

== Schedule ==
Date	Opponent	Site	Result	Attendance	Source
October 5	at Wisconsin	Camp Randall Stadium; Madison, WI	W 33–0	19,000	
October 11	Kansas State	Marquette Stadium; Milwaukee, WI	W 14–0	12,000	
October 18	at Saint Louis	Walsh Memorial Stadium; St. Louis, MO	W 20–13	10,000	
October 26	Ole Miss	Marquette Stadium; Milwaukee, WI	W 33–7	13,500	
November 2	Iowa State	Marquette Stadium; Milwaukee, WI	W 28–12	15,000	
November 9	at Michigan State	Macklin Field; East Lansing, MI	W 13–7	20,000	
November 16	at Temple	Temple Stadium; Philadelphia, PA	L 6–26	18,000	
November 23	Creighton	Marquette Stadium; Milwaukee, WI	W 26–0	12,000	
