= 1935 Central State Bearcats football team =

American college football season

1935 Central State Bearcats football
- Conference: Independent
- Record: 1–6
- Head coach: Alex Yunevich (2nd season)
- Home stadium: Alumni Field

1935 Midwestern college football independents records
	Conf.			Overall
Team	W	L	T	W		L		T
No. 23 Marquette		–		7	–	1	–	0
No. 8 Notre Dame		–		7	–	1	–	1
Michigan State		–		6	–	2	–	0
DePaul		–		5	–	2	–	1
Wayne		–		5	–	2	–	1
Detroit		–		6	–	3	–	0
Xavier		–		6	–	3	–	0
Michigan State Normal		–		4	–	2	–	2
Western State Teachers		–		5	–	3	–	0
Michigan Tech		–		2	–	2	–	1
Saint Louis		–		5	–	6	–	0
Central State (MI)		–		1	–	6	–	0
Haskell		–		0	–	7	–	1
Rankings from United Press

The 1935 Central State Bearcats football team represented Central State Teachers College, later renamed Central Michigan University, as an independent during the 1935 college football season. In their second season under head coach Alex Yunevich, the Bearcats compiled a 1–6 record and were outscored by their opponents by a combined total of 101 to 32. The team's only win was by a 19–0 score over Assumption from Windsor, Ontario. The worst defeat was by a 43–0 score against Gus Dorais' Detroit Titans.

== Schedule ==
Date	Opponent	Site	Result	Attendance	Source
September 27	at Detroit	University of Detroit Stadium; Detroit, MI	L 0–43	10,000	
October 5	at Ferris Institute	Big Rapids, MI	L 7–12		
October 12	Wayne^{†}	Alumni Field; Mount Pleasant, MI	L 6–13		
October 19	Michigan State Normal	Alumni Field; Mount Pleasant, MI (rivalry)	L 0–7		
November 2	Assumption (ON)	Alumni Field; Mount Pleasant, MI	W 19–0		
November 9	Western State Teachers	Alumni Field; Mount Pleasant, MI (rivalry)	L 0–13		
November 16	Alma	Alumni Field; Mount Pleasant, MI	L 0–13		
^{†}Homecoming
