= 1935 BYU Cougars football team =

American college football season

1935 BYU Cougars football
- Conference: Rocky Mountain Conference
- Record: 4–4 (3–4 RMC)
- Head coach: G. Ott Romney (8th season)

1935 Rocky Mountain Conference football standings
	Conf.					Overall
Team	W		L		T	W		L		T
Colorado +	5	–	1	–	0	5	–	4	–	0
Utah State +	5	–	1	–	1	5	–	2	–	1
Utah	4	–	1	–	1	4	–	3	–	1
Denver	5	–	2	–	0	6	–	3	–	0
Colorado College	4	–	2	–	1	4	–	3	–	1
Colorado State–Greeley	2	–	1	–	0	4	–	3	–	0
BYU	3	–	4	–	0	4	–	4	–	0
Wyoming	3	–	4	–	0	4	–	4	–	0
Colorado A&M	2	–	4	–	1	3	–	4	–	1
Montana State	1	–	5	–	0	2	–	6	–	1
Colorado Mines	1	–	6	–	0	1	–	6	–	0
Western State (CO)	0	–	4	–	0	1	–	6	–	0
+ – Conference co-champions

The 1935 BYU Cougars football team was an American football team that represented Brigham Young University (BYU) as a member of the Rocky Mountain Conference (RMC) during the 1935 college football season. In their eighth season under head coach G. Ott Romney, the Cougars compiled an overall record of 4–4 with a mark of 3–4 against conference opponents, tied for sixth in the RMC, and were outscored by a total of 90 to 78.

== Schedule ==
Date	Opponent	Site	Result	Source
September 28	at Montana State	Gatton Field; Bozeman, MT	L 0–7	
October 12	Colorado State–Greeley	Provo, UT	W 19–3	
October 19	Colorado College	Provo, UT	L 12–13	
October 26	at Wyoming	Corbett Field; Laramie, WY	W 13–6	
November 2	Utah	BYU Stadium; Provo, UT (rivalry)	L 0–32	
November 9	at Western State (CO)	Gunnison, CO	W 21–2	
November 16	at Utah State	Aggie Stadium; Logan, UT (rivalry)	L 0–27	
November 23	at Arizona State*	Montgomery Stadium; Phoenix, AZ	W 13–0	
*Non-conference game
