= 1935 Nebraska Cornhuskers football team =

American college football season

1935 Nebraska Cornhuskers football
- Conference: Big Six Conference
- Record: 6–2–1 (4–0–1 Big 6)
- Head coach: Dana X. Bible (7th season)
- Home stadium: Memorial Stadium

1935 Big Six Conference football standings
	Conf.					Overall
Team	W		L		T	W		L		T
No. 21 Nebraska $	4	–	0	–	1	6	–	2	–	1
Oklahoma	3	–	2	–	0	6	–	3	–	0
Kansas	2	–	2	–	1	4	–	4	–	1
Kansas State	1	–	2	–	2	2	–	4	–	3
Iowa State	1	–	3	–	1	2	–	4	–	3
Missouri	0	–	2	–	3	3	–	3	–	3
$ – Conference champion; Rankings from United Press

The 1935 Nebraska Cornhuskers football team was an American football team that represented the University of Nebraska in the Big Six Conference during the 1935 college football season. In its seventh season under head coach Dana X. Bible, the team compiled a 6–2–1 record (4–0–1 against conference opponents), won the Big Six championship, and outscored opponents by a total of 138 to 71. The team played its home games at Memorial Stadium in Lincoln, Nebraska.

== Before the season ==
Coach Bible became the longest Nebraska head football coach in program history to date when he began his seventh season with the Cornhuskers. The 1934 squad had been made almost entirely of new starters who proved themselves by dropping only three games, two of which were to the teams that would end the season nationally ranked #1 and #2, and finishing second in the Big 6. Almost all of them were back, experienced, and ready to try to put Nebraska back on top.

== Schedule ==
Date	Time	Opponent	Site	Result	Attendance	Source
September 28	2:00 p.m.	Chicago*	Memorial Stadium; Lincoln, NE	W 28–7		
October 5	2:00 p.m.	at Iowa State	State Field; Ames, IA (rivalry)	W 20–7	9,349	
October 12	2:00 p.m.	Minnesota*	Memorial Stadium; Lincoln, NE (rivalry)	L 7–12	35,000	
October 19	2:00 p.m.	at Kansas State	Memorial Stadium; Manhattan, KS (rivalry)	T 0–0		
October 26	3:00 p.m.	Oklahoma	Memorial Stadium; Lincoln, NE (rivalry)	W 19–0		
November 2	2:00 p.m.	at Missouri	Memorial Stadium; Columbia, MO (rivalry)	W 19–6	8,000	
November 9	2:00 p.m.	Kansas^{†}	Memorial Stadium; Lincoln, NE (rivalry)	W 19–13	30,000	
November 16	1:00 p.m.	at Pittsburgh*	Pitt Stadium; Pittsburgh, PA	L 0–6	30,000	
November 28	2:00 p.m.	Oregon State*	Memorial Stadium; Lincoln, NE	W 26–20		
*Non-conference game; ^{†}Homecoming; All times are in Central time

== Roster ==
Amen, Paul #33 E Andrews, Harris #21 HB; Ball, Arthur #20 HB; Bauer, Henry #14 QB; Benson, Robert #26 HB; Cardwell, Lloyd #24 HB; Dodd, Edward #27 HB; Doherty, William #48 T Dohrmann, Elmer #36 E Douglas, Ronald #25 FB; Doyle, Theodore #43 T Eldridge, Ralph #18 HB; Ellis, John #49 T English, Lowell #30 C Flasnick, Don #28 G Francis, Sam #38 FB; Glenn, Pat #17 G	Hale, Leland #23 E Heldt, James #32 T Holmbeck, Harold #34 T Howell, John #13 QB; Hubka, Ladas #16 G LaNoue, Gerald #11 HB; McDonald, Lester #35 E McGinnis, Kenneth #37 G Mehring, Robert #19 C Morrison, Paul #46 C Peters, Gus #42 G Richardson, John #31 E Scherer, Bernard #44 E Shirey, Fred #45 T Turner, Allan #15 HB; Williams, John #22 G

== Coaching staff ==
Name	Title	First year in this position	Years at Nebraska	Alma mater
Dana X. Bible	Head coach	1929	1929–1936	Carson-Newman
Henry Schulte	Lineman Coach	1931	1919–1924, 1931–1937	Michigan
Ed Weir	Freshmen Coach	1929	1926, 1929–1937, 1943	Nebraska
W. Harold Browne	Assistant coach	1930	1930–1940	
Franklin Meier		1935	1935	Nebraska

== Game summaries ==
=== Chicago ===
Chicago at Nebraska

Team	1	2	Total
Chicago			7
• Nebraska			28

- Date: September 28
- Location: Memorial Stadium • Lincoln, Nebraska

Chicago journeyed to Lincoln to repay a visit made by Nebraska to Chicago's home field back in 1905, which ended as a 5–38 defeat handed down by the Maroons, one of only two losses suffered by the 1905 Cornhuskers. This time around, the debt was repaid in full as Nebraska's line appeared to already be in mid-season form and the Chicago team was handily defeated in the Nebraska opening game. The teams never met again, and the record therefore remained evenly divided between them at 1–1–0.

=== Iowa State ===
Nebraska at Iowa State

Team	1	2	Total
• Nebraska			20
Iowa State			7

- Date: October 5
- Location: Clyde Williams Field • Ames, Iowa
- Game attendance: 9,349

Iowa State hosted Nebraska to open conference play, and the visiting Cornhuskers had little difficulty starting their Big 6 schedule on the right foot with yet another win against the Cyclones. Iowa State, now having dropped 13 straight to Nebraska, was quickly falling out of sight in their series deficit, at 4–25–1.

=== Minnesota ===
Minnesota at Nebraska

Team	1	2	Total
• Minnesota			12
Nebraska			7

- Date: October 12
- Location: Memorial Stadium • Lincoln, Nebraska
- Game attendance: 35,000

The reigning national championship Minnesota Golden Gophers team arrived in Lincoln in a high-interest game that was broadcast nationally on two radio networks. Nebraska fell by just five points. Minnesota improved over the Cornhuskers to 13–2–2. The Gophers went on to finish the season undefeated at 8–0–0 and ranked #2 nationally by the Dickinson System, while the United Press International's first ever end-of-season poll ranked Minnesota at #1.

=== Kansas State ===
Nebraska at Kansas State

Team	1	2	Total
Nebraska			0
Kansas State			0

- Date: October 19
- Location: Memorial Stadium • Manhattan, Kansas

A bit of a hangover from the emotional defeat at the hands of Minnesota the week before seemed to bog down the Cornhuskers when they visited Kansas State to avenge being denied the 1934 Big 6 title. Instead, while Nebraska succeeded in holding the Wildcats without a score, Nebraska also failed to ever get the ball across the line or between the uprights themselves, handing both teams a scoreless tie. The record held steady, well in Nebraska's favor, at 16–2–2.

=== Oklahoma ===
Oklahoma at Nebraska

Team	1	2	Total
Oklahoma			0
• Nebraska			19

- Date: October 26
- Location: Memorial Stadium • Lincoln, Nebraska
- Game weather: Rain

Coach Bible succeeded in shaking off the doldrums that slowed his Cornhuskers in Manhattan, and led Nebraska to a convincing shutout victory over the visiting Oklahoma Sooners, where it seemed that all functions of the Cornhusker machine were once again working as expected. Nebraska's winning streak over Oklahoma was now at five, and they remained in command of the series at 11–2–2.

=== Missouri ===
Nebraska at Missouri

Team	1	2	Total
• Nebraska			19
Missouri			6

- Date: November 2
- Location: Faurot Field • Columbia, Missouri

Although the Tigers scored first, it was another year of frustration for Missouri, as Nebraska defeated the Tigers for the fifth time in a row (and stayed undefeated against them for eight straight), once again retaining custody of the Missouri-Nebraska Bell that the Tigers had possessed for only the duration of one game to date (literally from when it was awarded prior to the Missouri-Nebraska kickoff in 1928 until Nebraska won that game). Nebraska's command over Missouri was now up to 20–6–3.

=== Kansas ===
Kansas at Nebraska

Team	1	2	Total
Kansas			13
• Nebraska			19

- Date: November 9
- Location: Memorial Stadium • Lincoln, Nebraska
- Game attendance: 30,000

Kansas gave Nebraska some tense moments in front of the homecoming crowd, scoring first and trailing just 7–12 at the half. The Jayhawks pulled ahead again by one point to keep the pressure on, though the Cornhuskers managed to answer again and hold before time expired. This was the 12th straight win over Kansas, and the 31–9–2 advantage held by Nebraska was the largest against all opponents at that time. The win closed out Nebraska's 1935 Big 6 schedule with no losses, clinching the league title.

=== Pittsburgh ===
Nebraska at Pittsburgh

Team	1	2	Total
Nebraska			0
• Pittsburgh			6

- Date: November 16
- Location: Pitt Stadium • Pittsburgh

A closely matched, hard-fought defensive battle yielded only one score on the day, which belonged to the home team Panthers. Nebraska suffered yet another loss to rival Pittsburgh, their 3rd in a row and 10th straight without a victory. Pittsburgh went on to finish the season 7–1–2 and ranked #10 nationally in the United Press International's first ever end-of-season poll.

=== Oregon State ===
Oregon State at Nebraska

Team	1	2	Total
Oregon State			20
• Nebraska			26

- Date: November 28
- Location: Memorial Stadium • Lincoln, Nebraska

Oregon State provided the last win for the 1935 Cornhuskers, in a game that featured big plays again and again. Midway through the third quarter, the Beavers were holding the lead with Nebraska reserves on the field. Coach Bible put the starters back in, and they summarily marched 65 yards in 13 plays to put up the game-winning points. Nebraska remained perfect against Oregon State all-time in the four meetings of these teams.

== After the season ==
Coach Bible brought home another Big 6 championship to add to his sizable collection, Nebraska's sixth over the last eight seasons. The United Press International released their first-ever end-of-season national poll, for just this year, which showed the Cornhuskers finishing at #21. Coach Bible's career record at Nebraska improved to 43–13–7 (.738), and he brought the Cornhusker program total to 263–87–27 (.733) while advancing the league record to what had become a commanding dominance of 82–11–9 (.848).

=== Awards ===
Award	Name(s)
All-American	Gerald LaNoue
All-American 3rd team	Bernard Scherer
All-Big 6 team	Lloyd Cardwell, Sam Francis, Gerald LaNoue, Bernard Scherer, Fred Shirey
Eastern All-Star Team	Gerald LaNoue, Bernard Scherer
