= 1935 Ohio Bobcats football team =

American college football season

1935 Ohio Bobcats football

BAA champion
- Conference: Buckeye Athletic Association
- Record: 8–0 (5–0 BAA)
- Head coach: Don Peden (12th season)
- Home stadium: Ohio Stadium

1935 Buckeye Athletic Association football standings
	Conf.					Overall
Team	W		L		T	W		L		T
No. 21 Ohio $	5	–	0	–	0	8	–	0	–	0
Cincinnati	3	–	2	–	0	7	–	2	–	0
Ohio Wesleyan	3	–	2	–	0	5	–	3	–	1
Dayton	2	–	2	–	1	4	–	4	–	1
Miami (OH)	1	–	3	–	1	5	–	3	–	1
Marshall	0	–	5	–	0	4	–	6	–	0
$ – Conference champion; Rankings from United Press

The 1935 Ohio Bobcats football team was an American football team that represented Ohio University as a member of the Buckeye Athletic Association (BAA) during the 1935 college football season. In their 12th season under head coach Don Peden, the Bobcats compiled a perfect 8–0 record (5–0 against conference opponents), won the BAA championship, shut out five of eight opponents, and outscored all opponents by a total of 170 to 36.

== Schedule ==
Date	Opponent	Site	Result	Attendance	Source
September 28	at Illinois*	Memorial Stadium; Champaign, IL	W 6–0	19,404	
October 11	at John Carroll*	Cleveland Municipal Stadium; Cleveland, OH	W 49–0		
October 19	at Marshall	Fairfield Stadium; Huntington, WV (rivalry)	W 20–13	6,500	
October 26	Dayton	Ohio Stadium; Athens, OH	W 26–0	8,000	
November 2	Miami (OH)	Ohio Stadium; Athens, OH (rivalry)	W 20–0		
November 9	Muskingum*	Ohio Stadium; Athens, OH	W 20–17	8,000	
November 16	at Cincinnati	Carson Field; Cincinnati, OH	W 16–6	13,000	
November 23	Ohio Wesleyan	Ohio Stadium; Athens, OH	W 13–0		
*Non-conference game
