= 1935 Washburn Ichabods football team =

American college football season

1935 Washburn Ichabods football
- Conference: Missouri Valley Conference
- Record: 4–6 (1–2 MVC)
- Head coach: Ernest Bearg (9th season)
- Home stadium: Moore Bowl

1935 Missouri Valley Conference football standings
	Conf.					Overall
Team	W		L		T	W		L		T
Washington University +	3	–	0	–	0	6	–	4	–	0
Tulsa +	3	–	0	–	0	3	–	6	–	1
Creighton	2	–	1	–	1	3	–	5	–	1
Drake	1	–	2	–	1	4	–	4	–	2
Washburn	1	–	2	–	0	4	–	6	–	0
Grinnell	1	–	2	–	0	3	–	5	–	1
Oklahoma A&M	0	–	3	–	0	3	–	7	–	0
+ – Conference co-champions

The 1935 Washburn Ichabods football team represented Washburn University during the 1935 college football season. Washburn played their home games at the Moore Bowl in Topeka, Kansas. In their ninth and final year under head coach Ernest Bearg, the Ichabods compiled a 4–6 record and were 1–2 in their first season as members of the Missouri Valley Conference.

== Schedule ==
Date	Opponent	Site	Result	Attendance	Source
September 20	Baker*	Moore Bowl; Topeka, KS	W 32–7		
September 27	Kansas State Teachers*	Moore Bowl; Topeka, KS (rivalry)	W 12–7		
October 4	at Grinnell	Grinnell, IA	L 6–12		
October 11	at St. Benedict's*	Atchison, KS	L 6–13		
October 18	Tulsa	Moore Bowl; Topeka, KS	L 6–19	4,500	
October 26	at Gonzaga*	Gonzaga Stadium; Spokane, WA	L 0–21		
November 2	Haskell*	Moore Bowl; Topeka, KS	W 14–2		
November 16	at Creighton	Creighton Stadium; Omaha, NE	W 20–3	5,000	
November 23	at Fort Hays State*	Hays, KS	L 6–12		
November 28	at Wichita*	Wichita, KS	L 6–7		
*Non-conference game
