= 1935 Xavier Musketeers football team =

American college football season

1935 Xavier Musketeers football
- Conference: Independent
- Record: 6–3
- Head coach: Joseph A. Meyer (16th season; first 3 games); Clem Crowe (1st season, final 6 games)
- Home stadium: Corcoran Field

1935 Midwestern college football independents records
	Conf.			Overall
Team	W	L	T	W		L		T
No. 23 Marquette		–		7	–	1	–	0
No. 8 Notre Dame		–		7	–	1	–	1
Michigan State		–		6	–	2	–	0
DePaul		–		5	–	2	–	1
Wayne		–		5	–	2	–	1
Detroit		–		6	–	3	–	0
Xavier		–		6	–	3	–	0
Michigan State Normal		–		4	–	2	–	2
Western State Teachers		–		5	–	3	–	0
Michigan Tech		–		2	–	2	–	1
Saint Louis		–		5	–	6	–	0
Central State (MI)		–		1	–	6	–	0
Haskell		–		0	–	7	–	1
Rankings from United Press

The 1935 Xavier Musketeers football team was an American football team that represented Xavier University as an independent during the 1935 college football season. The team compiled a 6–3 record, shut out six of nine opponents, and outscored all opponents by a total of 164 to 35. The team played its home games at Corcoran Field in Cincinnati.

The team began the season under head coach Joseph A. Meyer who had been the head coach since 1920. After the team lost two of its first three games, Meyer resigned and was replaced by Clem Crowe. Crowe had been the head basketball coach and an assistant football coach on Meyer's staff. Crowe coached the final six games, including five victories.

== Schedule ==
Date	Time	Opponent	Site	Result	Attendance	Source
September 20		Georgetown (KY)	Corcoran Field; Cincinnati, OH	W 34–0	3,500	
September 27		Kentucky	Corcoran Field; Cincinnati, OH	L 7–21	15,000	
October 4		West Virginia Wesleyan	Corcoran Field; Cincinnati, OH	L 0–7	6,500	
October 11		Transylvania	Corcoran Field; Cincinnati, OH	W 39–0	2,000	
October 18	8:15 p.m.	Haskell	Corcoran Field; Cincinnati, OH	W 32–0	6,000	
October 26		Mississippi State	Corcoran Field; Cincinnati, OH	L 0–7	9,000	
November 9	2:30 p.m.	Centre^{†}	Corcoran Field; Cincinnati, OH	W 27–0	6,500	
November 15		at Saint Louis	Walsh Stadium; St. Louis, MO	W 13–0	3,500	
November 28		Centenary	Corcoran Field; Cincinnati, OH	W 12–0		
^{†}Homecoming; All times are in Eastern time
