= 1935 Detroit Titans football team =

American college football season

1935 Detroit Titans football
- Conference: Independent
- Record: 6–3
- Head coach: Gus Dorais (11th season)
- Home stadium: University of Detroit Stadium

1935 Midwestern college football independents records
| | Conf. | | | Overall |
| Team | W | L | T | W | | L | | T |
|---|---|---|---|---|---|---|---|---|
| No. 23 Marquette | | – | | 7 | – | 1 | – | 0 |
| No. 8 Notre Dame | | – | | 7 | – | 1 | – | 1 |
| Michigan State | | – | | 6 | – | 2 | – | 0 |
| DePaul | | – | | 5 | – | 2 | – | 1 |
| Wayne | | – | | 5 | – | 2 | – | 1 |
| Detroit | | – | | 6 | – | 3 | – | 0 |
| Xavier | | – | | 6 | – | 3 | – | 0 |
| Michigan State Normal | | – | | 4 | – | 2 | – | 2 |
| Western State Teachers | | – | | 5 | – | 3 | – | 0 |
| Michigan Tech | | – | | 2 | – | 2 | – | 1 |
| Saint Louis | | – | | 5 | – | 6 | – | 0 |
| Central State (MI) | | – | | 1 | – | 6 | – | 0 |
| Haskell | | – | | 0 | – | 7 | – | 1 |
Rankings from United Press

The 1935 Detroit Titans football team represented the University of Detroit in the 1935 college football season. Detroit outscored its opponents by a combined total of 187 to 61 and finished with a 6–3 record in its 11th year under head coach and College Football Hall of Fame inductee, Gus Dorais.

== Schedule ==
| Date | Opponent | Site | Result | Attendance | Source |
|---|---|---|---|---|---|
| September 27 | Central State (MI) | University of Detroit Stadium; Detroit, MI | W 43–0 | 10,000 | |
| October 4 | Haskell | University of Detroit Stadium; Detroit, MI | W 27–0 | 10,000 | |
| October 11 | Oklahoma A&M | University of Detroit Stadium; Detroit, MI | W 13–0 | 10,000 | |
| October 19 | Catholic University | University of Detroit Stadium; Detroit, MI | L 7–13 | > 15,000 | |
| October 26 | Villanova | University of Detroit Stadium; Detroit, MI | W 19–15 | 15,000 | |
| November 2 | at Villanova | Villanova Stadium; Villanova, PA | L 7–13 | 10,000 | |
| November 9 | Bucknell | University of Detroit Stadium; Detroit, MI | W 53–0 | 12,000 | |
| November 23 | at Duquesne | Forbes Field; Pittsburgh PA | L 6–13 | 7,100 | |
| November 28 | at Texas Tech | Tech Field; Lubbock, TX | W 12–7 | | |
