= 1935 Oklahoma Sooners football team =

American college football season

1935 Oklahoma Sooners football
- Conference: Big Six Conference
- Record: 6–3 (3–2 Big 6)
- Head coach: Biff Jones (1st season)
- Offensive scheme: Single-wing
- Captain: Morris McDannald
- Home stadium: Memorial Stadium

1935 Big Six Conference football standings
	Conf.					Overall
Team	W		L		T	W		L		T
No. 21 Nebraska $	4	–	0	–	1	6	–	2	–	1
Oklahoma	3	–	2	–	0	6	–	3	–	0
Kansas	2	–	2	–	1	4	–	4	–	1
Kansas State	1	–	2	–	2	2	–	4	–	3
Iowa State	1	–	3	–	1	2	–	4	–	3
Missouri	0	–	2	–	3	3	–	3	–	3
$ – Conference champion; Rankings from United Press

The 1935 Oklahoma Sooners football team represented the University of Oklahoma in the 1935 college football season. In their first year under head coach Biff Jones, the Sooners compiled a 6–3 record (3–2 against conference opponents), finished in second place in the Big Six Conference, and outscored their opponents by a combined total of 99 to 44.

Tackle J. W. "Dub" Wheeler received All-America honors in 1935, and four Sooners received all-conference honors: Wheeler, backs Bill Breedon and Nick Robertson and tackle Ralph Brown.

== Schedule ==
Date	Opponent	Site	Result	Attendance	Source
September 28	Colorado*	Memorial Stadium; Norman, OK	W 3–0		
October 5	New Mexico*	Memorial Stadium; Norman, OK	W 25–0	7,000	
October 12	vs. Texas*	Fair Park Stadium; Dallas, TX (rivalry)	L 7–12	16,000	
October 19	Iowa State	Memorial Stadium; Norman, OK	W 16–0	10,407	
October 26	at Nebraska	Memorial Stadium; Lincoln, NE (rivalry)	L 0–19		
November 2	Kansas	Memorial Stadium; Norman, OK	L 0–7		
November 9	at Missouri	Memorial Stadium; Columbia, MO (rivalry)	W 20–6	9,000	
November 16	at Kansas State	Memorial Stadium; Manhattan, KS	W 3–0		
November 28	Oklahoma A&M*	Memorial Stadium; Norman, OK (Bedlam Series)	W 25–0	10,000	
*Non-conference game

== NFL draft ==
One Sooner players was drafted as part of the inaugural NFL draft following the season.

Round	Pick	Player	Position	NFL team
2	16	J. W. Wheeler	Tackle	Green Bay Packers
