= 1935 North Dakota Agricultural Bison football team =

American college football season

1935 North Dakota Agricultural Bison football

NCC champion
- Conference: North Central Conference
- Record: 7–1–1 (4–0–1 NCC)
- Head coach: Casey Finnegan (8th season)
- Captain: Sam Dobervich
- Home stadium: Dacotah Field

1935 North Central Conference football standings
	Conf.					Overall
Team	W		L		T	W		L		T
North Dakota Agricultural $	4	–	0	–	1	7	–	1	–	1
North Dakota	3	–	0	–	2	6	–	2	–	2
Iowa State Teachers	2	–	0	–	0	6	–	3	–	0
South Dakota	2	–	2	–	1	5	–	3	–	1
South Dakota State	1	–	3	–	1	4	–	4	–	1
Omaha	1	–	3	–	0	6	–	3	–	0
Morningside	0	–	5	–	1	0	–	6	–	1
$ – Conference champion

The 1935 North Dakota Agricultural Bison football team was an American football team that represented North Dakota Agricultural College (now known as North Dakota State University) in the North Central Conference (NCC) during the 1935 college football season. In its eighth season under head coach Casey Finnegan, the team compiled a 7–1–1 record (3–0–1 against NCC opponents) and won the NCC championship.

== Schedule ==
Date	Opponent	Site	Result	Attendance	Source
September 20	Concordia (MN)*	Dacotah Field; Fargo, ND	W 13–0		
September 28	at Minnesota*	Memorial Stadium; Minneapolis, MN	L 6–26	35,000	
October 4	Morningside	Dacotah Field; Fargo, ND	W 14–0		
October 12	South Dakota State	Dacotah Field; Fargo, ND (rivalry)	W 7–6		
October 19	Moorhead State*	Dacotah Field; Fargo, ND	W 7–0		
October 26	at North Dakota	Grand Forks, ND (rivalry)	T 20–20	8,000	
November 11	at Omaha	Omaha, NE	W 20–6		
November 16	at South Dakota	Mitchell, SD	W 20–0	< 1,000	
November 22	at Wichita*	Wichita, KS	W 14–0		
*Non-conference game
