= 1935 Saint Louis Billikens football team =

American college football season

1935 Saint Louis Billikens football
- Conference: Independent
- Record: 5–6
- Head coach: Cecil Muellerleile (2nd season)
- Home stadium: Walsh Stadium

1935 Midwestern college football independents records
	Conf.			Overall
Team	W	L	T	W		L		T
No. 23 Marquette		–		7	–	1	–	0
No. 8 Notre Dame		–		7	–	1	–	1
Michigan State		–		6	–	2	–	0
DePaul		–		5	–	2	–	1
Wayne		–		5	–	2	–	1
Detroit		–		6	–	3	–	0
Xavier		–		6	–	3	–	0
Michigan State Normal		–		4	–	2	–	2
Western State Teachers		–		5	–	3	–	0
Michigan Tech		–		2	–	2	–	1
Saint Louis		–		5	–	6	–	0
Central State (MI)		–		1	–	6	–	0
Haskell		–		0	–	7	–	1
Rankings from United Press

The 1935 Saint Louis Billikens football team was an American football team that represented Saint Louis University as an independent during the 1935 college football season. In its second season under head coach Cecil Muellerleile, the team compiled a 5–6 record and outscored opponents by a total of 185 to 114. The team played its home games at Edward J. Walsh Memorial Stadium in St. Louis.

== Schedule ==
Date	Opponent	Site	Result	Attendance	Source
September 21	Sewanee	Walsh Memorial Stadium; St. Louis, MO	W 32–0	3,500	
September 28	at Creighton	Creighton Stadium; Omaha, NE	L 0–13	8,000–10,000	
October 4	Kirksville	Walsh Memorial Stadium; St. Louis, MO	W 37–7		
October 11	Missouri Mines	Walsh Memorial Stadium; St. Louis, MO	W 38–0		
October 18	Marquette	Walsh Memorial Stadium; St. Louis, MO	L 13–20	10,000	
October 25	Arkansas State	Walsh Memorial Stadium; St. Louis, MO	W 46–7	5,500	
November 1	Ole Miss	Walsh Memorial Stadium; St. Louis, MO	L 7–21	10,000	
November 8	North Dakota	Walsh Memorial Stadium; St. Louis, MO	L 6–7	6,500	
November 15	Xavier	Walsh Memorial Stadium; St. Louis, MO	L 0–13	3,500	
November 23	at DePaul	Soldier Field; Chicago, IL	W 6–0	2,000	
November 28	at Washington University	Francis Field; St. Louis, MO	L 0–26	18,000	
