= 1935 Utah Utes football team =

American college football season

1935 Utah Utes football
- Conference: Rocky Mountain Conference
- Record: 4–3–1 (4–1–1 RMC)
- Head coach: Ike Armstrong (11th season)
- Home stadium: Ute Stadium

1935 Rocky Mountain Conference football standings
	Conf.					Overall
Team	W		L		T	W		L		T
Utah State +	5	–	1	–	1	5	–	2	–	1
Colorado +	5	–	1	–	0	5	–	4	–	0
Utah	4	–	1	–	1	4	–	3	–	1
Denver	5	–	2	–	0	6	–	3	–	0
Colorado State–Greeley	2	–	1	–	0	4	–	3	–	0
Colorado College	4	–	2	–	1	4	–	3	–	1
BYU	3	–	4	–	0	4	–	4	–	0
Wyoming	3	–	4	–	0	4	–	4	–	0
Colorado A&M	2	–	4	–	1	3	–	4	–	1
Montana State	1	–	5	–	0	2	–	6	–	1
Colorado Mines	1	–	6	–	0	1	–	6	–	0
Western State (CO)	0	–	4	–	0	1	–	6	–	0
+ – Conference co-champions

The 1935 Utah Utes football team was an American football team that represented the University of Utah as a member of the Rocky Mountain Conference (RMC) during the 1935 college football season. In their 11th season under head coach Ike Armstrong, the Utes compiled an overall record of 4–3–1 with a mark of 4–1–1 in conference play, placed third in the RMC, and outscored all opponents by a total of 166 to 69.

== Schedule ==
Date	Opponent	Site	Result	Attendance	Source
October 5	at Oregon*	Hayward Field; Eugene, OR	L 0–6	8,000	
October 12	Montana State	Ute Stadium; Salt Lake City, UT	W 47–0		
October 26	Denver	Ute Stadium; Salt Lake City, UT	W 39–14	10,000	
November 2	at BYU	BYU Stadium; Provo, UT (rivalry)	W 32–0		
November 9	Colorado^{†}	Ute Stadium; Salt Lake City, UT (rivalry)	L 0–14		
November 16	at Colorado A&M	Colorado Field; Fort Collins, CO	W 14–0	6,500	
November 28	Utah State	Ute Stadium; Salt Lake City, UT (rivalry)	T 14–14	20,000	
December 14	Hawaii*	Honolulu Stadium; Honolulu, Territory of Hawaii	L 20–21	17,000	
*Non-conference game; ^{†}Homecoming
