= 1935 Kansas State Wildcats football team =

American college football season

1935 Kansas State Wildcats football
- Conference: Big Six Conference
- Record: 2–4–3 (1–2–2 Big 6)
- Head coach: Wesley Fry (1st season)
- Home stadium: Memorial Stadium

1935 Big Six Conference football standings
	Conf.					Overall
Team	W		L		T	W		L		T
No. 21 Nebraska $	4	–	0	–	1	6	–	2	–	1
Oklahoma	3	–	2	–	0	6	–	3	–	0
Kansas	2	–	2	–	1	4	–	4	–	1
Kansas State	1	–	2	–	2	2	–	4	–	3
Iowa State	1	–	3	–	1	2	–	4	–	3
Missouri	0	–	2	–	3	3	–	3	–	3
$ – Conference champion; Rankings from United Press

The 1935 Kansas State Wildcats football team represented Kansas State University in the 1935 college football season. The team's head football coach was Wesley Fry, in his first year at the helm of the Wildcats. The Wildcats played their home games in Memorial Stadium. The Wildcats finished the season with a 2–4–3 record with a 1–2–2 record in conference play. They finished in fourth place in the Big Six Conference. The Wildcats scored 40 points and gave up 49 points.

== Schedule ==
Date	Opponent	Site	Result	Attendance	Source
September 27	at Duquesne*	Forbes Field; Pittsburgh, PA	W 12–0		
October 5	Fort Hays*	Memorial Stadium; Manhattan, KS	L 0–3	5,200	
October 11	at Marquette*	Marquette Stadium; Milwaukee, WI	L 0–14	12,000	
October 19	Nebraska^{†}	Memorial Stadium; Manhattan, KS (rivalry)	T 0–0	16,000	
October 26	at Kansas	Memorial Stadium; Lawrence, KS (rivalry)	L 2–9	10,000	
November 2	at Tulsa*	Skelly Field; Tulsa, OK	T 13–13	7,000	
November 9	at Iowa State	State Field; Ames, IA (rivalry)	W 6–0	5,000	
November 16	Oklahoma	Memorial Stadium; Manhattan, KS	L 0–3	8,500	
November 23	at Missouri	Memorial Stadium; Columbia, MO	T 7–7	5,500	
*Non-conference game; ^{†}Homecoming
