= 1935 Colorado Buffaloes football team =

American college football season

1935 Colorado Buffaloes football
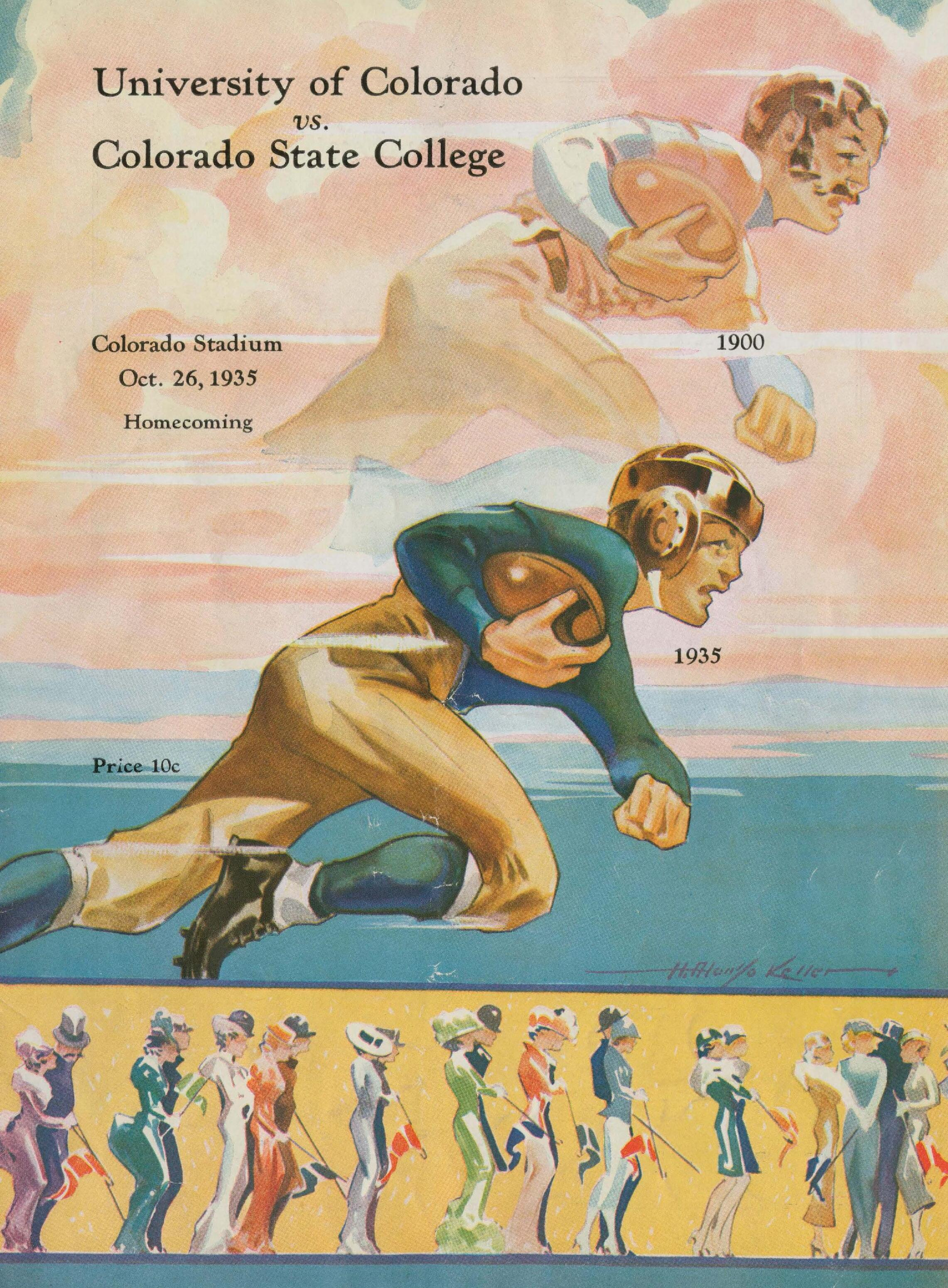
- Cover of a homecoming pamphlet for the October 26 game

RMC co-champion
- Conference: Rocky Mountain Conference
- Record: 5–4 (5–1 RMC)
- Head coach: Bunny Oakes (1st season)
- Captain: Game captains
- Home stadium: Colorado Stadium

1935 Rocky Mountain Conference football standings
	Conf.					Overall
Team	W		L		T	W		L		T
Utah State +	5	–	1	–	1	5	–	2	–	1
Colorado +	5	–	1	–	0	5	–	4	–	0
Utah	4	–	1	–	1	4	–	3	–	1
Denver	5	–	2	–	0	6	–	3	–	0
Colorado State–Greeley	2	–	1	–	0	4	–	3	–	0
Colorado College	4	–	2	–	1	4	–	3	–	1
BYU	3	–	4	–	0	4	–	4	–	0
Wyoming	3	–	4	–	0	4	–	4	–	0
Colorado A&M	2	–	4	–	1	3	–	4	–	1
Montana State	1	–	5	–	0	2	–	6	–	1
Colorado Mines	1	–	6	–	0	1	–	6	–	0
Western State (CO)	0	–	4	–	0	1	–	6	–	0
+ – Conference co-champions

The 1935 Colorado Buffaloes football team was an American football team that represented the University of Colorado as a member of the Rocky Mountain Conference (RMC) during the 1935 college football season. In its first season under head coach Bunny Oakes, the team compiled an overall record of 5–4 record with a mark of 5–1 against conference opponents, shared RMC title with Utah State, and outscored all opponents by a total of 140 to 47.

Quarterback Kayo Lam led the team with 1,043 rushing yards and 286 passing yards. Lam was also the team's punter and punter. He averaged 40.2 yards on 32 punts and 19.4 yard on 25 returns. On October 19, 1935, Lam rushed 226 yards and four touchdowns on only seven carries for a school record 32.29 yards per carry.

== Schedule ==
Date	Opponent	Site	Result	Attendance	Source
September 28	at Oklahoma*	Oklahoma Memorial Stadium; Norman, OK	L 0–3	12,000	
October 12	at Missouri*	Memorial Stadium; Columbia, MO	L 6–20	7,000	
October 19	Colorado Mines	Colorado Stadium; Boulder, CO	W 58–0		
October 26	Colorado A&M^{†}	Colorado Stadium; Boulder, CO (rivalry)	W 19–6		
November 2	Colorado College	Colorado Stadium; Boulder, CO	W 23–0		
November 9	at Utah	Ute Stadium; Salt Lake City, UT (rivalry)	W 14–0		
November 16	Kansas*	Colorado Stadium; Boulder, CO	L 6–12		
November 23	Wyoming	Colorado Stadium; Boulder, CO	L 0–6		
November 28	at Denver	Pioneer Stadium; Denver, CO	W 14–0	28,000–30,000	
*Non-conference game; ^{†}Homecoming
