= 1935 Missouri Tigers football team =

American college football season

1935 Missouri Tigers football
- Conference: Big Six Conference
- Record: 3–3–3 (0–2–3 Big 6)
- Head coach: Don Faurot (1st season)
- Home stadium: Memorial Stadium

1935 Big Six Conference football standings
	Conf.					Overall
Team	W		L		T	W		L		T
No. 21 Nebraska $	4	–	0	–	1	6	–	2	–	1
Oklahoma	3	–	2	–	0	6	–	3	–	0
Kansas	2	–	2	–	1	4	–	4	–	1
Kansas State	1	–	2	–	2	2	–	4	–	3
Iowa State	1	–	3	–	1	2	–	4	–	3
Missouri	0	–	2	–	3	3	–	3	–	3
$ – Conference champion; Rankings from United Press

The 1935 Missouri Tigers football team was an American football team that represented the University of Missouri in the Big Six Conference (Big 6) during the 1935 college football season. The team compiled a 3–3–3 record (0–2–3 against Big 6 opponents), finished in sixth place in the Big 6, and outscored all opponents by a total of 97 to 77.

Don Faurot, previously the head football coach at Kirksville Teachers College, was hired as Missouri's head coach in January 1935. He remained as Missouri's head coach for the first of 19 seasons.

The team played its home games at Memorial Stadium in Columbia, Missouri.

Missouri s leading scorers were Al Londe and Henry Mahley, each with 18 points.

== Schedule ==
Date	Opponent	Site	Result	Attendance	Source
September 28	William Jewell*	Memorial Stadium; Columbia, MO	W 39–0	6,000	
October 5	Central Missouri State*	Memorial Stadium; Columbia, MO	W 7–0		
October 12	Colorado*	Memorial Stadium; Columbia, MO	W 20–6	7,000	
October 26	at Iowa State	State Field; Ames, IA (rivalry)	T 6–6	10,000	
November 2	Nebraska	Memorial Stadium; Columbia, MO (rivalry)	L 6–19	8,000	
November 9	Oklahoma^{†}	Memorial Stadium; Columbia, MO (rivalry)	L 6–20	9,000	
November 16	at Washington University*	Francis Field; St. Louis, MO	L 6–19	8,544	
November 23	Kansas State	Memorial Stadium; Columbia, MO	T 7–7	5,500	
November 28	at Kansas	Memorial Stadium; Lawrence, KS (rivalry)	T 0–0	17,000	
*Non-conference game; ^{†}Homecoming
