= 1935 Haskell Indians football team =

American college football season

1935 Haskell Indians football
- Conference: Independent
- Record: 0–7–1
- Head coach: John Levi (1st season)

1935 Midwestern college football independents records
	Conf.			Overall
Team	W	L	T	W		L		T
No. 23 Marquette		–		7	–	1	–	0
No. 8 Notre Dame		–		7	–	1	–	1
Michigan State		–		6	–	2	–	0
DePaul		–		5	–	2	–	1
Wayne		–		5	–	2	–	1
Detroit		–		6	–	3	–	0
Xavier		–		6	–	3	–	0
Michigan State Normal		–		4	–	2	–	2
Western State Teachers		–		5	–	3	–	0
Michigan Tech		–		2	–	2	–	1
Saint Louis		–		5	–	6	–	0
Central State (MI)		–		1	–	6	–	0
Haskell		–		0	–	7	–	1
Rankings from United Press

The 1935 Haskell Indians football team was an American football that represented the Haskell Institute—now known as Haskell Indian Nations University—as an independent during the 1935 college football season. The team compiled a record of 0–7–1, failed to score a point in five of its eight games, and was outscored by a total of 166 to 37.

In August 1935, following the departure of Gus Welch, John Levi was named as the head coach of Haskell's football, basketball, and track teams. Levi, a full-blooded Arapaho, had been a star athlete at Haskell, winning 16 varsity letters from 1921 to 1924.

== Schedule ==
Date	Time	Opponent	Site	Result	Attendance	Source
October 4		at Detroit	University of Detroit Stadium; Detroit, MI	L 0–27	10,000	
October 12		at Toledo	Toledo, OH	T 0–0		
October 18	7:15 p.m.	at Xavier	Corcoran Field; Cincinnati, OH	L 0–32	6,000	
October 25	8:15 p.m.	at Drake	Drake Stadium; Des Moines, IA	L 0–21	3,500	
November 2		at Washburn	Topeka, KS	L 2–14		
November 9	2:30 p.m.	Emporia Teachers	Lawrence, KS	L 21–27		
November 16		at Oklahoma A&M	Lewis Field; Stillwater, OK	L 0–20	4,000	
November 22		St. Benedict's	Lawrence, KS	L 14–25		
All times are in Central time
