= 1935 Creighton Bluejays football team =

American college football season

1935 Creighton Bluejays football
- Conference: Missouri Valley Conference
- Record: 3–5–1 (2–2–1 MVC)
- Head coach: Marchmont Schwartz (1st season)
- Home stadium: Creighton Stadium

1935 Missouri Valley Conference football standings
	Conf.					Overall
Team	W		L		T	W		L		T
Washington University +	3	–	0	–	0	6	–	4	–	0
Tulsa +	3	–	0	–	0	3	–	6	–	1
Creighton	2	–	1	–	1	3	–	5	–	1
Drake	1	–	2	–	1	4	–	4	–	2
Washburn	1	–	2	–	0	4	–	6	–	0
Grinnell	1	–	2	–	0	3	–	5	–	1
Oklahoma A&M	0	–	3	–	0	3	–	7	–	0
+ – Conference co-champions

The 1935 Creighton Bluejays football team was an American football team that represented Creighton University as a member of the Missouri Valley Conference (MVC) during the 1935 college football season. In its first season under head coach Marchmont Schwartz, the team compiled a 3–5–1 record (2–2–1 against MVC opponents) and was outscored by a total of 112 to 58. The team played its home games at Creighton Stadium in Omaha, Nebraska.

== Schedule ==
Date	Opponent	Site	Result	Attendance	Source
September 28	Saint Louis*	Creighton Stadium; Omaha, NE	W 13–0	8,000–10,000	
October 5	Oklahoma A&M	Creighton Stadium; Omaha, NE	W 16–0	11,000	
October 12	at Rice*	Rice Field; Houston, TX	L 0–14	10,000	
October 19	Drake	Creighton Stadium; Omaha, NE	T 6–6	> 10,000	
October 26	at Grinnell	Grinnell, IA	W 7–6	2,000	
November 2	at Washington University	Francis Field; St. Louis, MO	L 7–33	5,500	
November 9	at South Dakota	Sioux Falls, SD	L 6–7		
November 16	Washburn	Creighton Stadium; Omaha, NE	L 3–20	5,000	
November 23	at Marquette*	Marquette Stadium; Milwaukee, WI	L 0–26	12,000	
*Non-conference game
