= 1935 West Virginia Wesleyan Bobcats football team =

American college football season

1935 West Virginia Wesleyan Bobcats football

WVAC champion
- Conference: West Virginia Athletic Conference
- Record: 7–2–1 (4–0 WVAC)
- Head coach: Cebe Ross (11th season)

1935 West Virginia Athletic Conference football standings
	Conf.					Overall
Team	W		L		T	W		L		T
West Virginia Wesleyan $	4	–	0	–	0	7	–	2	–	1
Salem	6	–	1	–	0	6	–	2	–	0
West Liberty State	5	–	2	–	0	7	–	2	–	0
Concord	3	–	4	–	0	4	–	4	–	0
Glenville State	3	–	4	–	0	4	–	4	–	0
Morris Harvey	2	–	4	–	0	2	–	7	–	0
Fairmont State	2	–	5	–	0	2	–	6	–	0
Shepherd	1	–	3	–	1	1	–	6	–	1
New River State	0	–	4	–	0	1	–	5	–	0
Bethany (WV) *	1	–	0	–	0	5	–	3	–	0
Marshall *	2	–	1	–	0	4	–	6	–	0
Potomac State *	1	–	1	–	1	1	–	4	–	1
Davis & Elkins *	1	–	2	–	0	2	–	7	–	0
$ – Conference champion; * – Did not qualify for conference standings Ties did not count in conference standings.

The 1935 West Virginia Wesleyan Bobcats football team represented West Virginia Wesleyan College as a member of the West Virginia Athletic Conference (WVAC) during the 1935 college football season. Led by 11th-year head coach Cebe Ross, the Bobcats compiled an overall record of 7–2–1 with a mark of 4–0 in conference play, winning the WVAC title.

== Schedule ==
Date	Time	Opponent	Site	Result	Attendance	Source
September 28		at West Virginia*	Mountaineer Field; Morgantown, WV	T 0–0	4,500	
October 4		at Xavier*	Corcoran Field; Cincinnati, OH	W 7–0	6,500	
October 11		at Saint Vincent*	Greensburg, PA	W 19–0		
October 19		Waynesburg*^{†}	Buckhannon, WV	W 19–6		
October 26		at Geneva*	Beaver Falls, PA	L 8–26		
November 2		at Davis & Elkins	Elkins, WV	W 12–6		
November 9	2:00 p.m.	at Catholic University*	Griffith Stadium; Washington, DC	L 6–19		
November 15		Salem	Buckhannon, WV	W 14–12		
November 22		Glenville State	Buckhannon, WV	W 19–6		
November 28		at Marshall	Fairfield Stadium; Huntington, WV	W 6–0		
*Non-conference game; ^{†}Homecoming; All times are in Eastern time
