= 1935 Marshall Thundering Herd football team =

American college football season

1935 Marshall Thundering Herd football
- Conference: Buckeye Athletic Association, West Virginia Athletic Conference
- Record: 4–6 (0–4 BAA, 2–1 WVAC)
- Head coach: Cam Henderson (1st season)
- Captain: John Zontini
- Home stadium: Fairfield Stadium

1935 Buckeye Athletic Association football standings
	Conf.					Overall
Team	W		L		T	W		L		T
No. 21 Ohio $	5	–	0	–	0	8	–	0	–	0
Cincinnati	3	–	2	–	0	7	–	2	–	0
Ohio Wesleyan	3	–	2	–	0	5	–	3	–	1
Dayton	2	–	2	–	1	4	–	4	–	1
Miami (OH)	1	–	3	–	1	5	–	3	–	1
Marshall	0	–	5	–	0	4	–	6	–	0
$ – Conference champion; Rankings from United Press

1935 West Virginia Athletic Conference football standings
	Conf.					Overall
Team	W		L		T	W		L		T
West Virginia Wesleyan $	4	–	0	–	0	7	–	2	–	1
Salem	6	–	1	–	0	6	–	2	–	0
West Liberty State	5	–	2	–	0	7	–	2	–	0
Concord	3	–	4	–	0	4	–	4	–	0
Glenville State	3	–	4	–	0	4	–	4	–	0
Morris Harvey	2	–	4	–	0	2	–	7	–	0
Fairmont State	2	–	5	–	0	2	–	6	–	0
Shepherd	1	–	3	–	1	1	–	6	–	1
New River State	0	–	4	–	0	1	–	5	–	0
Bethany (WV) *	1	–	0	–	0	5	–	3	–	0
Marshall *	2	–	1	–	0	4	–	6	–	0
Potomac State *	1	–	1	–	1	1	–	4	–	1
Davis & Elkins *	1	–	2	–	0	2	–	7	–	0
$ – Conference champion; * – Did not qualify for conference standings Ties did not count in conference standings.

The 1935 Marshall Thundering Herd football team was an American football team that represented Marshall College (now Marshall University) as a member of the Buckeye Athletic Association (BAA) and the West Virginia Athletic Conference (WVAC) during the 1935 college football season. In its first season under head coach Cam Henderson, the Thundering Herd compiled an overall of 4–6 record and outscored opponents by a total of 139 to 117. Marshall had a record of 0–4 in BAA play, placing last out of five teams, and a record of 2–1 against WVAC opponents, but did not play enough conference games to qualify for the WVAC standings. John Zontini was the team captain.

== Schedule ==
Date	Opponent	Site	Result	Attendance	Source
September 28	Concord	Fairfield Stadium; Huntington, WV	W 31–0		
October 4	Morris Harvey	Fairfield Stadium; Huntington, WV	W 18–0		
October 11	at Dayton	University of Dayton Stadium; Dayton, OH	L 6–20	3,500	
October 19	Ohio	Fairfield Stadium; Huntington, WV	L 13–20		
October 26	at Miami (OH)	Miami Field; Oxford, OH	L 13–20	6,000	
November 2	vs. Emory and Henry*	Municipal Stadium; Bluefield, WV	W 14–0		
November 9	Cincinnati	Fairfield Stadium; Huntington, WV	L 13–39		
November 16	at Ohio Wesleyan	Delaware, OH	L 0–6		
November 22	Rio Grande*	Fairfield Stadium; Huntington, WV	W 25–0		
November 28	West Virginia Wesleyan^{†}	Fairfield Stadium; Huntington, WV	L 6–12		
*Non-conference game; ^{†}Homecoming
