= 1935 South Dakota State Jackrabbits football team =

American college football season

1935 South Dakota State Jackrabbits football
- Conference: North Central Conference
- Record: 4–4–1 (1–3–1 NCC)
- Head coach: Red Threlfall (2nd season)
- Home stadium: State Field

1935 North Central Conference football standings
	Conf.					Overall
Team	W		L		T	W		L		T
North Dakota Agricultural $	4	–	0	–	1	7	–	1	–	1
North Dakota	3	–	0	–	2	6	–	2	–	2
Iowa State Teachers	2	–	0	–	0	6	–	3	–	0
South Dakota	2	–	2	–	1	5	–	3	–	1
South Dakota State	1	–	3	–	1	4	–	4	–	1
Omaha	1	–	3	–	0	6	–	3	–	0
Morningside	0	–	5	–	1	0	–	6	–	1
$ – Conference champion

The 1935 South Dakota State Jackrabbits football team was an American football team that represented South Dakota State University in the North Central Conference (NCC) during the 1935 college football season. In its second season under head coach Red Threlfall, the team compiled a 4–4–1 record and outscored opponents by a total of 123 to 92.

During the season, the team's quarterback Sol Kramer was ruled ineligible. Halfback Paul Miller was the offensive star and played for the Green Bay Packers from 1936 to 1938.

== Schedule ==
Date	Opponent	Site	Result	Attendance	Source
September 21	Northern Normal*	State Field; Brookings, SD	W 33–0		
September 28	at Wisconsin*	Camp Randall Stadium; Madison, WI	W 13–6	13,000	
October 5	at Cincinnati*	Nippert Stadium; Cincinnati, OH	L 0–38	9,500	
October 12	at North Dakota Agricultural	Dacotah Field; Fargo, ND (rivalry)	L 6–7		
October 19	North Dakota	State Field; Brookings, SD	T 6–6		
October 26	at South Dakota	Vermillion, SD (rivalry)	L 2–7		
November 8	Morningside	State Field; Brookings, SD	W 12–6		
November 16	St. Olaf*	State Field; Brookings, SD	W 38–0		
November 23	at Iowa State Teachers	Cedar Falls, IA	L 13–22		
*Non-conference game
