= John Levi (American football) =

Arapahoe Indian athlete and coach (1898–1946)

Biographical details
- Born: June 14, 1898; Bridgeport, Oklahoma, U.S.
- Died: January 22, 1946 (aged 47); Denver, Colorado, U.S.

Playing career
- 1919: Phillips
- 1922–1924: Haskell
- Position(s): Fullback

Coaching career (HC unless noted)
- 1927–1934: Haskell (assistant)
- 1935: Haskell

Head coaching record
- Overall: 0–7–1

Accomplishments and honors

Awards
- First-team All-American (1923)

John C. "Skee" Levi (June 14, 1898 – January 22, 1946) was an Arapaho Indian athlete, playing college football for the Haskell Indians. Allegedly Jim Thorpe called him the greatest athlete he'd ever seen. He then coached at his alma mater.

Levi died on January 22, 1946, at Denver General Hospital in Denver, Colorado, after he was fatally stabbed by Fannie Stabler. In May 1946, Stabler was convicted of voluntary manslaughter.

== Head coaching record ==
Year	Team	Overall	Conference	Standing	Bowl/playoffs
Haskell Indians (Independent) (1935)
1935	Haskell	0–7–1			
Haskell:		0–7–1			
Total:		0–7–1			
