= 1935 Dayton Flyers football team =

American college football season

1935 Dayton Flyers football
- Conference: Buckeye Athletic Association
- Record: 4–4–1 (2–2–1 BAA)
- Head coach: Harry Baujan (13th season)
- Home stadium: University of Dayton Stadium

1935 Buckeye Athletic Association football standings
	Conf.					Overall
Team	W		L		T	W		L		T
No. 21 Ohio $	5	–	0	–	0	8	–	0	–	0
Cincinnati	3	–	2	–	0	7	–	2	–	0
Ohio Wesleyan	3	–	2	–	0	5	–	3	–	1
Dayton	2	–	2	–	1	4	–	4	–	1
Miami (OH)	1	–	3	–	1	5	–	3	–	1
Marshall	0	–	5	–	0	4	–	6	–	0
$ – Conference champion; Rankings from United Press

The 1935 Dayton Flyers football team was an American football team that represented the University of Dayton as a member of the Buckeye Athletic Association during the 1935 college football season. In its 13th season under head coach Harry Baujan, the team compiled a 4–4–1 record.

== Schedule ==
Date	Opponent	Site	Result	Attendance	Source
September 28	at Cincinnati	Nippert Stadium; Cincinnati, OH	L 0–29		
October 4	Ohio Wesleyan	University of Dayton Stadium; Dayton, OH	W 13–0	6,000	
October 11	Marshall	University of Dayton Stadium; Dayton, OH	W 20–6	3,500	
October 19	DePaul*	University of Dayton Stadium; Dayton, OH	L 3–14	5,000	
October 26	at Ohio	Ohio Stadium; Athens, OH	L 0–26	8,000	
November 9	Canisius*	University of Dayton Stadium; Dayton, OH	L 0–6		
November 16	Miami (OH)^{†}	University of Dayton Stadium; Dayton, OH	T 6–6	5,000	
November 23	Wittenberg*	University of Dayton Stadium; Dayton, OH	W 27–0		
November 28	at John Carroll*	Municipal Stadium; Cleveland, OH	W 19–0		
*Non-conference game; ^{†}Homecoming
