= 1935 Iowa State Cyclones football team =

American college football season

1935 Iowa State Cyclones football
- Conference: Big Six Conference
- Record: 2–4–3 (1–3–1 Big 6)
- Head coach: George F. Veenker (5th season)
- Captain: Ike Hayes
- Home stadium: State Field

1935 Big Six Conference football standings
| | Conf. | | | | | Overall |
| Team | W | | L | | T | W | | L | | T |
|---|---|---|---|---|---|---|---|---|---|---|
| No. 21 Nebraska $ | 4 | – | 0 | – | 1 | 6 | – | 2 | – | 1 |
| Oklahoma | 3 | – | 2 | – | 0 | 6 | – | 3 | – | 0 |
| Kansas | 2 | – | 2 | – | 1 | 4 | – | 4 | – | 1 |
| Kansas State | 1 | – | 2 | – | 2 | 2 | – | 4 | – | 3 |
| Iowa State | 1 | – | 3 | – | 1 | 2 | – | 4 | – | 3 |
| Missouri | 0 | – | 2 | – | 3 | 3 | – | 3 | – | 3 |
$ – Conference champion; Rankings from United Press

The 1935 Iowa State Cyclones football team represented Iowa State College of Agricultural and Mechanic Arts (later renamed Iowa State University) in the Big Six Conference during the 1935 college football season. In their fifth season under head coach George F. Veenker, the Cyclones compiled a 2–4–3 record (1–3–1 against conference opponents), finished in fifth place in the conference, and were outscored by opponents by a combined total of 101 to 82. They played their home games at State Field in Ames, Iowa.

Ike Hayes was the team captain. Two Iowa State players were selected as first-team all-conference players: guard Ike Hayes and tackle John Catron.

== Schedule ==
| Date | Time | Opponent | Site | Result | Attendance | Source |
|---|---|---|---|---|---|---|
| September 28 | 2:00 pm | Cornell (IA)* | State Field; Ames, IA | T 6–6 | 3,918 | |
| October 5 | 2:00 pm | Nebraska | State Field; Ames, IA (rivalry) | L 7–20 | 9,349 | |
| October 12 | 2:00 pm | Upper Iowa* | State Field; Ames, IA | W 23–0 | 3,610 | |
| October 19 | 2:00 pm | at Oklahoma | Oklahoma Memorial Stadium; Norman, OK | L 0–16 | 10,407 | |
| October 26 | 2:00 pm | Missouri^{†} | State Field; Ames, IA (rivalry) | T 6–6 | 7,315–10,000 | |
| November 2 | 2:00 pm | at Marquette* | Marquette Stadium; Milwaukee, WI | L 12–28 | 15,000 | |
| November 9 | 2:00 pm | Kansas State | State Field; Ames, IA (rivalry) | L 0–6 | 3,832 | |
| November 16 | 2:00 pm | at Drake* | Drake Stadium; Des Moines, IA | T 7–7 | 7,533 | |
| November 23 | 2:00 pm | at Kansas | Memorial Stadium; Lawrence, KS | W 21–12 | 7,697 | |
*Non-conference game; ^{†}Homecoming; All times are in Central time
