= 1935 Utah State Aggies football team =

American college football season

1935 Utah State Aggies football

RMC co-champion
- Conference: Rocky Mountain Conference
- Record: 5–2–1 (5–1–1 RMC)
- Head coach: Dick Romney (17th season)
- Home stadium: Aggie Stadium

1935 Rocky Mountain Conference football standings
	Conf.					Overall
Team	W		L		T	W		L		T
Colorado +	5	–	1	–	0	5	–	4	–	0
Utah State +	5	–	1	–	1	5	–	2	–	1
Utah	4	–	1	–	1	4	–	3	–	1
Denver	5	–	2	–	0	6	–	3	–	0
Colorado College	4	–	2	–	1	4	–	3	–	1
Colorado State–Greeley	2	–	1	–	0	4	–	3	–	0
BYU	3	–	4	–	0	4	–	4	–	0
Wyoming	3	–	4	–	0	4	–	4	–	0
Colorado A&M	2	–	4	–	1	3	–	4	–	1
Montana State	1	–	5	–	0	2	–	6	–	1
Colorado Mines	1	–	6	–	0	1	–	6	–	0
Western State (CO)	0	–	4	–	0	1	–	6	–	0
+ – Conference co-champions

The 1935 Utah State Aggies football team was an American football team that represented Utah State Agricultural College—now known as Utah State University as a member of the Rocky Mountain Conference (RMC) during the 1935 college football season. In their 17th season under head coach Dick Romney, the Aggies compiled an overall record of 5–2–1 record with a mark of 5–1–1 against conference opponents, shared the RMC title with Colorado, and outscored all opponents by a total of 165 to 73.

== Schedule ==
Date	Opponent	Site	Result	Attendance	Source
September 21	Montana State	Aggie Stadium; Logan, UT	W 33–7		
September 28	at UCLA*	Los Angeles Memorial Coliseum; Los Angeles, CA	L 0–39	12,000	
October 19	at Denver	DU Stadium; Denver, CO	L 7–13	11,925	
October 26	Colorado Mines	Aggie Stadium; Logan, UT	W 53–0		
November 2	Colorado A&M	Aggie Stadium; Logan, UT	W 13–0	7,000	
November 9	Wyoming	Aggie Stadium; Logan, UT (rivalry)	W 18–0		
November 16	BYU	Aggie Stadium; Logan, UT (rivalry)	W 27–0		
November 28	at Utah	Ute Stadium; Salt Lake City, UT (rivalry)	T 14–14	20,000	
*Non-conference game
