= 1935 Oklahoma A&M Cowboys football team =

American college football season

1935 Oklahoma A&M Cowboys football
- Conference: Missouri Valley Conference
- Record: 3–7 (0–3 MVC)
- Head coach: Albert Exendine (2nd season)
- Home stadium: Lewis Field

1935 Missouri Valley Conference football standings
	Conf.					Overall
Team	W		L		T	W		L		T
Washington University +	3	–	0	–	0	6	–	4	–	0
Tulsa +	3	–	0	–	0	3	–	6	–	1
Creighton	2	–	1	–	1	3	–	5	–	1
Drake	1	–	2	–	1	4	–	4	–	2
Washburn	1	–	2	–	0	4	–	6	–	0
Grinnell	1	–	2	–	0	3	–	5	–	1
Oklahoma A&M	0	–	3	–	0	3	–	7	–	0
+ – Conference co-champions

The 1935 Oklahoma A&M Cowboys football team represented Oklahoma A&M College in the 1935 college football season. This was the 35th season of football program at A&M and the second season under Albert Exendine. The Cowboys played their home games at Lewis Field in Stillwater, Oklahoma. They finished the season 3–7, 0–3 in the Missouri Valley Conference.

== Schedule ==
Date	Opponent	Site	Result	Attendance	Source
September 27	Oklahoma City*	Lewis Field; Stillwater, OK	W 6–0		
October 5	at Creighton	Creighton Stadium; Omaha, NE	L 0–16	11,000	
October 11	at Detroit*	University of Detroit Stadium; Detroit, MI	L 0–13	10,000	
October 18	Southeastern Oklahoma State*	Lewis Field; Stillwater, Oklahoma	W 20–13		
October 26	at Tulsa	Skelly Field; Tulsa, OK (rivalry)	L 0–12	7,500	
November 2	at Texas Tech	Tech Field; Lubbock, TX	L 0–24		
November 9	Duquesne*^{†}	Lewis Field; Stillwater, OK	L 7–20		
November 16	Haskell*	Lewis Field; Stillwater, OK	W 20–0	4,000	
November 23	at Washington University	Francis Field; St. Louis, MO	L 13–39		
November 28	at Oklahoma*	Oklahoma Memorial Stadium; Norman, OK (Bedlam Series)	L 0–25		
*Non-conference game; ^{†}Homecoming
