= 1935 Notre Dame Fighting Irish football team =

American college football season

1935 Notre Dame Fighting Irish football
- Starting lineup for Northwestern
- Conference: Independent
- Record: 7–1–1
- Head coach: Elmer Layden (2nd season)
- Captain: Joe Sullivan
- Home stadium: Notre Dame Stadium

1935 Midwestern college football independents records
	Conf.			Overall
Team	W	L	T	W		L		T
No. 23 Marquette		–		7	–	1	–	0
No. 8 Notre Dame		–		7	–	1	–	1
Michigan State		–		6	–	2	–	0
DePaul		–		5	–	2	–	1
Wayne		–		5	–	2	–	1
Detroit		–		6	–	3	–	0
Xavier		–		6	–	3	–	0
Michigan State Normal		–		4	–	2	–	2
Western State Teachers		–		5	–	3	–	0
Michigan Tech		–		2	–	2	–	1
Saint Louis		–		5	–	6	–	0
Central State (MI)		–		1	–	6	–	0
Haskell		–		0	–	7	–	1
Rankings from United Press

The 1935 Notre Dame Fighting Irish football team was an American football team that represented the University of Notre Dame as an independent during the 1935 college football season. In their second season under head coach Elmer Layden, the Fighting Irish compiled a 7–1–1 record, outscored opponents by a total of 143 to 62, and were ranked No. 8 in the final United Press (UP) poll. Against ranked opponents, they defeated Big Ten co-champion Ohio State (No. 5 in the final UP poll) and Pittsburgh (No. 10 in the final UP poll), lost to Northwestern (No. 16 in the final UP poll), and tied with Army (No. 18 in the final UP poll). The victory over Ohio State, which included a dramatic fourth-quarter comeback, became known as the "Game of the Century".

End Wayne Millner and halfback/punter William Shakespeare received first-team honors on the 1935 All-America college football team. The team captain Joe Sullivan died before the season began.

The team played its home games at Notre Dame Stadium in Notre Dame, Indiana.

== Schedule ==
Date	Opponent	Site	Result	Attendance	Source
September 28	Kansas	Notre Dame Stadium; Notre Dame, IN	W 28–7	11,102–25,000	
October 5	at Carnegie Tech	Pittsburgh, PA	W 14–3	27,542–40,000	
October 12	at Wisconsin	Camp Randall Stadium; Madison, WI	W 27–0	19,863	
October 19	Pittsburgh	Notre Dame Stadium; Notre Dame, IN (rivalry)	W 9–6	39,989–51,000	
October 26	vs. Navy	Municipal Stadium; Baltimore, MD (rivalry)	W 14–0	57,810–65,000	
November 2	at Ohio State	Ohio Stadium; Columbus, OH	W 18–13	81,018	
November 9	Northwestern	Notre Dame Stadium; Notre Dame, IN (rivalry)	L 7–14	34,430–35,000	
November 16	vs. Army	Yankee Stadium; Bronx, NY (rivalry)	T 6–6	78,114–78,367	
November 23	USC	Notre Dame Stadium; Notre Dame, IN (rivalry)	W 20–13	38,305–50,000	

== "Game of the Century" ==
On November 2, 1935, Notre Dame defeated a previously undefeated and favored Ohio State team, 18–13, before a crowd of 81,018 spectators in Columbus, Ohio. Ohio State scored less than three minutes after the game began. Still in the first half, the Buckeyes extended their lead by intercepting a Bill Shakespeare pass and returning it 50 yards for a second touchdown. Ohio State held the lead, 13–0, at the start of the fourth quarter.

Notre Dame scored three touchdowns in the fourth quarter, including two in the final five minutes of the period. With less than a minute to play, and Ohio State still leading by one point, Andy Pilney ran 52 yards through "a swarm" of Ohio State tacklers, advancing the ball to the Ohio State 18-yard line. Pilney was badly hurt on the play, and his "limp body" was carried from the field on a stretcher. With only a few seconds remaining, Notre Dame had time for one more play. Shakespeare threw an accurate 30-yard pass that was caught by a leaping Wayne Millner in the end zone for the winning touchdown.

In his account of the game, sports columnist Grantland Rice called it "the greatest football victory in the long and brilliant history" of Notre Dame. The game became known as the "Game of the Century". Newsreel footage of the game was even shown in movie theaters billed as "the game of the century" and "The Football Battle of the Century".

== Rankings ==
Notre Dame was ranked in the top ten in several post-season rankings for 1935. They were rated No. 6 in the 1935 Boand System rankings; No. 7 in the Toledo Cup and Houlgate System rankings; No. 8 in the United Press poll; and No. 9 in the Dickinson System rankings.

== Personnel ==
=== Players ===
The following players started at least one game for the 1935 Notre Dame team:

- Harry Becker, right guard
- Fred Carideo, right halfback and fullback
- Church, left guard
- Don Elser, fullback
- Wally Fromhart, quarterback
- Frank Kopczak, right tackle
- John Lautar, left guard
- Mike Layden, right halfback and fullback
- James "Pepper" Martin, right guard
- John Michuta, right tackle
- Wayne Millner, left end
- Marty Peters, right end
- Dick Pfefferle, left tackle
- Henry Pojman, center
- William Shakespeare, left halfback
- Fred Solari, center
- Ken Stilley, left tackle
- Victor Wojcihovski, right halfback

=== Coaching staff ===
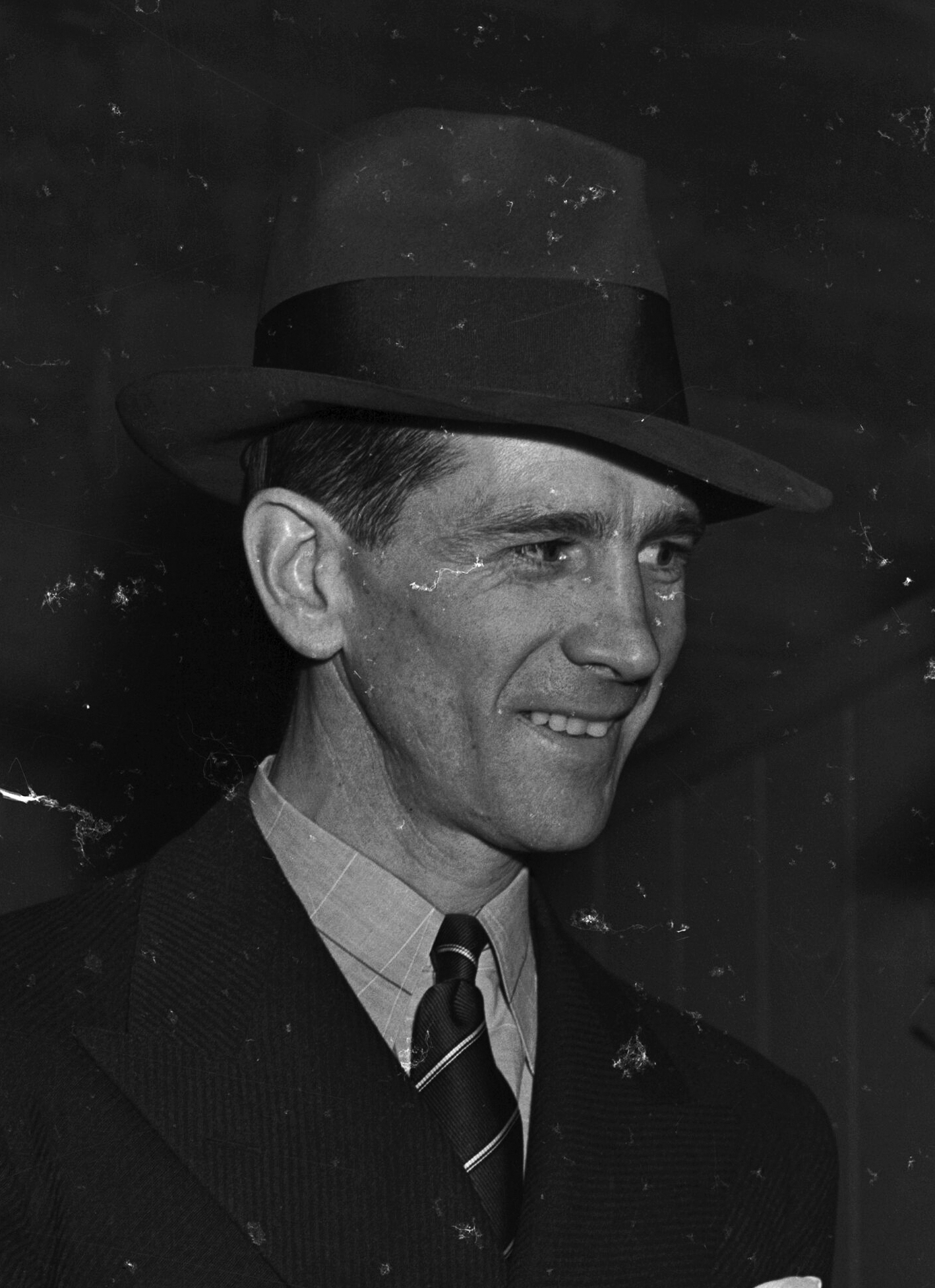
Elmer Layden

- Head coach: Elmer Layden
- Athletic director: Elmer Layden
- Line coach: Joe Boland
- Backfield coach: Donald C. Grant
- Ends coach: Tom Conley
- Chief "B" squad coach: Bill Cerney
- Head freshman coach: Jake Kline
- Chief assistant freshman coach: Tom Gorman
- Asssitant freshman coaches: Paul E. Schrenker and Jack Robinson

== Awards and honors ==
Three Notre Dame players received recognition on the 1935 All-America college football team.

End Wayne Millner, who caught the winning touchdown pass against Ohio State and was "a constant menace in every game," was a consensus first-team pick.

Halfback William Shakespeare, known as the "Merchant of Menace" and the "Bard", received first-team honors from the All-America Board and the Walter Camp Football Foundation and second-team honors from the United Press. Shakespeare was rated as "the great star of the team", known for accurate downfield passing, blocking, rushing, and punting—kicking the ball as far as 80 yards.

Halfback Andy Pilney received third-team honors from the Newspaper Enterprise Association.

== Death of Joe Sullivan ==
Captain Joe Sullivan died before the season began

Tackle Joe Sullivan was elected as the 1935 team captain in January 1935. A short time after his selection as captain, Sullivan became ill with a "streptococcic" infection that spread to his brain. He underwent six surgeries, but the infection resulted in his death in March 1935.

Sullivan was the latest in a series of tragic deaths impacting Notre Dame football, including George Gipp, Knute Rockne, Bernard Kirk, Johnny Weibel, and Johnny Young. The South Bend Tribune wrote following Sullivan's death that Sullivan was now playing on "heaven's team" led by Rockne.

The captaincy of the 1935 team was left vacant in Sullivan's honor. The editor of The South Bend Tribune wrote in September 1935 that "his spirit will lead the Irish into battle."
