= 1935 Michigan State Normal Hurons football team =

American college football season

1935 Michigan State Normal Hurons football
- Conference: Independent
- Record: 4–2–2
- Head coach: Elton Rynearson (14th season)
- Captains: Robert W. Jarosch; Homer H. Parker
- Home stadium: Normal Field

1935 Midwestern college football independents records
	Conf.			Overall
Team	W	L	T	W		L		T
No. 23 Marquette		–		7	–	1	–	0
No. 8 Notre Dame		–		7	–	1	–	1
Michigan State		–		6	–	2	–	0
DePaul		–		5	–	2	–	1
Wayne		–		5	–	2	–	1
Detroit		–		6	–	3	–	0
Xavier		–		6	–	3	–	0
Michigan State Normal		–		4	–	2	–	2
Western State Teachers		–		5	–	3	–	0
Michigan Tech		–		2	–	2	–	1
Saint Louis		–		5	–	6	–	0
Central State (MI)		–		1	–	6	–	0
Haskell		–		0	–	7	–	1
Rankings from United Press

The 1935 Michigan State Normal Hurons football team represented Michigan State Normal College (later renamed Eastern Michigan University) as an independent during the 1935 college football season. In their 14th season under head coach Elton Rynearson, the Hurons compiled a record of 4–2–2 and outscored their opponents by a combined total of 43 to 41. Robert W. Jarosch and Homer H. Parker were the team captains. The team played its home games at Normal Field on the school's campus in Ypsilanti, Michigan.

== Schedule ==
Date	Opponent	Site	Result
September 28	at Northern Michigan	Marquette, MI	L 0–2
October 5	at Wayne	Detroit, MI	W 16–6
October 12	Iowa State Teachers	Ypsilanti, MI	W 3–0
October 19	Central State (MI)	Ypsilanti, MI (rivalry)	W 7–0
October 26	at Illinois State Normal	Normal, IL	T 0–0
November 2	Valparaiso	Ypsilanti, MI	L 0–19
November 9	Indiana State	Ypsilanti, MI	W 10–7
November 16	at Hope	Holland, MI	T 7–7
