= 1935 Miami Redskins football team =

American college football season

1935 Miami Redskins football
- Conference: Buckeye Athletic Association
- Record: 5–3–1 (1–3–1 BAA)
- Head coach: Frank Wilton (4th season)
- Home stadium: Miami Field

1935 Buckeye Athletic Association football standings
	Conf.					Overall
Team	W		L		T	W		L		T
No. 21 Ohio $	5	–	0	–	0	8	–	0	–	0
Cincinnati	3	–	2	–	0	7	–	2	–	0
Ohio Wesleyan	3	–	2	–	0	5	–	3	–	1
Dayton	2	–	2	–	1	4	–	4	–	1
Miami (OH)	1	–	3	–	1	5	–	3	–	1
Marshall	0	–	5	–	0	4	–	6	–	0
$ – Conference champion; Rankings from United Press

The 1935 Miami Redskins football team was an American football team that represented Miami University as a member of the Buckeye Athletic Association (BAA) during the 1935 college football season. In its fourth season under head coach Frank Wilton, Miami compiled a 5–3–1 record (1–3–1 against conference opponents) and finished in fifth place out of six teams in the BAA.

== Schedule ==
Date	Opponent	Site	Result	Attendance	Source
September 28	Eastern Kentucky*	Miami Field; Oxford, OH	W 33–7		
October 5	Case*	Cleveland, OH	W 21–6		
October 12	at Ohio Wesleyan	Delaware, OH	L 0–8		
October 19	John Carroll	Miami Field; Oxford, OH	W 28–12		
October 26	Marshall	Miami Field; Oxford, OH	W 20–13		
November 2	at Ohio	Ohio Stadium; Athens, OH (rivalry)	L 0–20		
November 9	Adrian	Miami Field; Oxford, OH	W 59–0		
November 16	at Dayton	Dayton, OH	T 6–6	5,000	
November 28	at Cincinnati	Nippert Stadium; Cincinnati, OH (Victory Bell)	L 7–8		
*Non-conference game
