= 1935 South Dakota Coyotes football team =

American college football season

1935 South Dakota Coyotes football
- Conference: North Central Conference
- Record: 5–3–1 (1–3–1 NCC)
- Head coach: Harry Gamage (2nd season)
- Home stadium: Inman Field

1935 North Central Conference football standings
	Conf.					Overall
Team	W		L		T	W		L		T
North Dakota Agricultural $	4	–	0	–	1	7	–	1	–	1
North Dakota	3	–	0	–	2	6	–	2	–	2
Iowa State Teachers	2	–	0	–	0	6	–	3	–	0
South Dakota	2	–	2	–	1	5	–	3	–	1
South Dakota State	1	–	3	–	1	4	–	4	–	1
Omaha	1	–	3	–	0	6	–	3	–	0
Morningside	0	–	5	–	1	0	–	6	–	1
$ – Conference champion

The 1935 South Dakota Coyotes football team was an American football team that represented the University of South Dakota in the North Central Conference (NCC) during the 1935 college football season. In its second season under head coach Harry Gamage, the team compiled a 5–3–1 record (1–3–1 against NCC opponents), finished in fourth place out of seven teams in the NCC, and was outscored by a total of 126 to 83. The team played its home games at Inman Field in Vermillion, South Dakota.

== Schedule ==
Date	Opponent	Site	Result	Attendance	Source
September 21	Yankton*	Inman Field; Vermillion, SD	W 34–0		
September 28	Illinois Wesleyan*	Inman Field; Vermillion, SD	W 7–6		
October 5	at Iowa*	Iowa Stadium; Iowa City, IA	L 2–47		
October 11	at North Dakota	Grand Forks, ND (rivalry)	L 0–25		
October 19	at Morningside	Sioux City, IA	T 13–13	4,500	
October 26	South Dakota State^{†}	Inman Field; Vermillion, SD (Dakota Day)	W 7–2		
November 2	Omaha	Inman Field; Vermillion, SD	W 13–6		
November 9	vs. Creighton	Sioux Falls, SD	W 7–6		
November 16	vs. North Dakota Agricultural	Mitchell, SD	L 0–20	< 1,000	
*Non-conference game; ^{†}Homecoming
