= Sid Wagner =

American football player (1912–1972)

No. 17, 15
- Positions: Guard, tackle

Personal information
- Born: October 19, 1912; Lansing, Michigan, U.S.
- Died: June 5, 1972 (aged 59); Forest, Michigan, U.S.
- Listed height: 5 ft 11 in (1.80 m)
- Listed weight: 192 lb (87 kg)

Career information
- High school: Lansing Central
- College: Michigan State
- NFL draft: 1936: 1st round, 8th overall pick

Career history
- Detroit Lions (1936–1938)

Awards and highlights
- Consensus All-American (1935)

Career NFL statistics
- Games played: 27
- Stats at Pro Football Reference

Sidney P. Wagner (October 29, 1912 – June 5, 1972) was an American college and professional football player who was a lineman for the Michigan State Spartans football team of Michigan State University and the Detroit Lions of the National Football League (NFL). Wagner was a consensus All-American in 1935.

== Biography ==
Wagner was born in Lansing, Michigan in 1912 and attended Lansing Central High School. After high school, Wagner enrolled at Michigan State College in nearby East Lansing, Michigan. Wagner played on the first Michigan State team to defeat the Michigan Wolverines football team in consecutive years. Wagner was a junior in 1934, and the Spartans had not defeated the Wolverines since 1916. Wagner was one of the stars of the 1934 Michigan State team that ended the losing streak with a 16–0 win over Michigan. The celebration in East Lansing following the win over Michigan was reportedly "so euphoric" that Michigan State President Robert Shaw "cancelled Monday classes so it could continue." The 1934 Spartans finished with an 8–1 record.

In 1935, the Spartans beat the Wolverines again, this time by a score of 25–6, marking the first time the Spartans won two consecutive games against the Wolverines. Wagner was ranked as one of the top linemen in 1935. The Spartan Sports Encyclopedia described him as "light, aggressive, a superb blocker and deadly tackler." He was credited with 23 tackles in a 1935 game against Boston College. At the end of the 1935 season, Wagner was recognized as a consensus All-American at the guard position after receiving first-team All-American designations from the United Press, International News Service, the New York Sun, and Liberty Magazine (selected based on a poll of 1,521 varsity players in all parts of the country). In selecting him as a first-team All-American, the United Press wrote the following about Wagner: "Wagner is a ball hawk, a dependable leader of interference and rated by teammates and rivals as the fastest lineman today. Even in defeat Wagner was great." He was named the Spartan "Athlete of the Year" for the 1935–1936 school year.

Wagner was drafted by the Detroit Lions in the first round of the 1936 NFL draft. The 1936 draft was the first for the NFL, and Wagner was the first first-round pick for the Lions and the eighth pick overall in the inaugural draft. Wagner played in only five games in 1936. However, Detroit coach Potsy Clark announced a shakeup in his lineup in early November 1936, including the designation of Wagner as a starter in place of Sam Knox at left guard. Once he made the starting lineup, Wagner stayed. He played in all eleven games for the Lions in both the 1937 and 1938 seasons. However, in August 1939, Wagner announced his retirement from football, telling reporters that he intended to "devote all of his time to a promising career as an engineer."

== See also ==
- 1935 College Football All-America Team
